= Cuddie Springs =

Archaeological site in Australia

- Location within Australia
- 30°47′13″S 147°28′41″E
- Periods: Pleistocene
- Cultures: Prehistoric Australia
- Location: Carinda, Walgett Shire, New South Wales, Australia

Site notes
- Length: 200 m (660 ft)
- Width: 200 m (660 ft)
- Excavation dates: 1933, 1991–2009
- Archaeologists: Judith Field; Richard Fullagar

Cuddie Springs is a notable archaeological and paleontological site in the semi-arid zone of central northern New South Wales, Australia, near Carinda in Walgett Shire. Cuddie Springs is an open site, with the fossil deposits preserved in a claypan on the floor of an ancient ephemeral lake. The claypan fills with water after local rainstorms and often takes months to dry, a fact which facilitated the survival of fossils over a long period of time.

The site provided the first unequivocal association of stone artefacts with fossil remains of Australian megafauna. Cuddie Springs has been known as a fossil megafauna locality since the late 1870s, when a well was sunk into the centre of the claypan. The Australian Museum launched excavations in 1933 and while many bones were found, no archaeological discoveries were made in that initial research. More extensive excavations were conducted between 1991 and 1996 by a team from the University of New South Wales and were continued between 1997 and 2009 through the University of Sydney.

== Etymology ==
It was recorded that the word 'Cuddy' in the language of the "Marra Blacks" means bad. This has been interpreted as a reference to the quality of the water found in the Cuddie lake, which is alkaline with a pH between 7 and 9. Despite the name, Cuddie Springs is an ephemeral lake, and not a spring.

== Excavation history ==
In the historic period, Cuddie Springs was known to both Aboriginal and European people as a palaeontological site. A Dreaming story about Mullyan the eaglehawk is associated to the formation of the bone deposits at the site and the formation of the Macquarie Marshes to the south and the site is also part of a Dreaming track tied to the Macquarie Marshes and the Geera waterhole on the Barwon River.

Europeans first settled in the area around Cuddie Springs in the 1830s. A well was sunk into the middle of the claypan in 1876, the disused superstructure of which was still present in the 1920s. During the sinking of the well in the 1870s several large fossilised bones were recovered and were sent to the Australian Museum, some of which were later sent to Richard Owen who identified the fossils as belonging to different genus of Diprotodon, Euowenia, Nototherium, Genyornis, various Macropodidae, Megalania and at least one genus of crocodile, Pallimnarchus.

Despite attempts in the 1920s to excavate it was not until 1933 that the first excavations took place at Cuddie Springs. Led by the Australian Museum, the principal researchers described the excavation thus:

We commenced our excavations about 10 yards from the well, working towards the centre, and before work was stopped, about five weeks later, the claypan resembled the fields of Flanders, with a complicated series of trenches and pits, mostly about 5 feet in depth, but in one case about 15 feet.

Though a range of paleontological material was recovered from the site, no archaeological material was identified in the 1933 excavation. Full scale excavations at the site recommenced in 1991 after excavations designed to test the possibility of pollen preservation at the site uncovered a high concentration of bone and a dense layer of flaked stone artefacts, indicating the site had archaeological as well as paleontological potential.

The main archaeological excavations were carried out between 1996 and 2009. The majority of the excavated material is currently stored at the Australian Museum, and has featured in major exhibitions.

== Site setting ==
Cuddie Springs is located within the semi-arid zone, but palynological evidence indicates that 40,000 years ago there was a large permanent lake surrounded by open shrub land suitable for supporting megafauna.(Hiscock 2008, )

== Evidence for human co-existence with Australian megafauna ==
The excavators of Cuddie Springs reject humans as the primary cause of megafauna extinctions. They conclude that the 10,000 years of co-habitation of humans and megafauna at Cuddie Springs suggests that climate changes that began before the human colonisation of Australia were responsible for the megafauna extinctions. Wroe and Field cite the staggered extinctions that have been occurring since at least 130,000 years ago and the fact that megafauna in Tasmania do not occur after 46,000 years ago but people only arrived across a land bridge at 37,000 years ago. This staggered decline, mostly occurring in contexts independent of humans, is linked to environmental evidence for increasingly arid and erratic conditions since 400–300,000 years ago. The large body size of the megafauna suggests low fecundity and low population densities which have been argued to have made them susceptible to extinction due to habitat loss from increasing aridity.

The 10,000 years of co-habitation of humans and megafauna at Cuddie Springs that is the foundation of Wroe and Field's argument has been the subject of intense critical examination. This critique has identified a number of details that weaken the integrity of the association between humans and megafauna. First are the finds themselves, such as relatively large number of grinding stones in Pleistocene-age layers, as well as tula-adze-like flakes. The Pleistocene grinding stones are notable because they imply a broad-spectrum plant-processing economy much earlier than previously known in Australia. These finds are anomalous because in other parts of Australia they are restricted to late Holocene contexts. Amongst the megafauna bone layers there is a tooth of a crocodile, Pallimnarchus sp., that became extinct long before 40,000 years ago. The tooth is also exfoliated and heavily mineralised and the preservation is not consistent with other bone and teeth in the same level. There are stone artefacts with hair and blood adhering, but in the same layers there are megafauna bones with not even traces of protein remaining.

These inconsistent finds suggest that the process of site formation may have involved some mixing of materials of different ages. This leads to the second important detail, the stratigraphy. Cuddie Springs is unusual in having a dense deflation pavement that separates recent materials (such as cow bones) from the Pleistocene layers. The layers above the pavement contains cow bones mixed with megafauna bones but the layers below contain no cow bones. Archaeology Professor Bruno David has asked where the rocks in this pavement come from in a stone-poor riverine plain, and suggested that they may have been carried by Aboriginal people from a gibber plain 4 km from the site or by farmers during the late 19th or early 20th century to create a firm footing for people or cattle. Gillespie and Brook also suggest that the stone artefacts in the pavement are unusually dense for a Pleistocene archaeological site and may have been transported during well construction or represent an in situ but late Holocene archaeological site overlaying disturbed Late Pleistocene sediments. There is a long history of European activity at Cuddie Springs, with a well dug in 1876, ten metres from the 1990s excavation and trenches dug by the Australian Museum in 1933. These events likely caused disturbance of the stratigraphy. Gillespie and Brook add that cattle visiting the well may have pushed stone artefacts through the pavement into the Pleistocene layers during waterlogged conditions. Tracing the origins of the pavement is crucial to understanding the integrity of the Pleistocene layers.

Several authors have suggested that the Pleistocene stone artefacts and megafauna bones may have derived from separate contexts that have become mixed by underground water flow. Because it is a ground-fed spring and a site that is periodically inundated by rain, sediment at Cuddie Springs is highly likely to have been moved by water. The depth of the historic well suggests that the ground water level may have been near the level of the Pleistocene layers. Gillespie and David suggest that the upright orientation of an unarticulated Genyornis femur in the Pleistocene layers at Cuddie Springs might be explained by sediment movement due to water flow. This suggests that the megafauna bones might derive from much older sediments and have been reworked into the stone artefact bearing layers. A more direct link between the stone artefacts and the bones would be cut marks on the bones, but there are "few cut marks on any bones" at Cuddie Springs. Evidence favour of an intact Pleistocene deposit comes from analysis of rare-earth elements (REE) in the megafauna bones. The REE contents of the bones suggests that each depositional unit contains fauna with a discrete chemical signature and, therefore, a discrete and distinct postdepositional history, arguing against any postdepositional movement and mixing of bone between stratigraphic horizons. Gillespie and Brook comment that this still does not exclude an off-site origin of the bones (i.e. death of the animal) and subsequent fluvial transportation to Cuddie Springs. Field et al. (2006) dispute the proposal that flood movement caused the combination of megafauna and stone artefacts. They report that the sediments enclosing the bones and stones are fine-grained silts and clays resulting from a low-energy flow of water. They argue that if floods were responsible then larger sediments such as sands and gravels would have been found also.

The possibility of mixed Pleistocene deposits is also suggested by some interpretations of the chronology of the site, a third focus of the critiques (figure 6). So far, there are 20 radiocarbon dates and seven luminescence dates published for Cuddie Springs. Statistical analysis by Gillespie and Brook (2006) of the 16 radiocarbon dates from the Pleistocene layers (ranging from 28 to 33,000 years ago) suggest that they do not increase in age as depth increases. They interpret this to mean that the sediments have been disturbed since they were first deposited. The luminescence dates also suggest mixing, with Roberts et al. (2001) finding that the sediments sampled for dating have multiple palaeodose populations, suggesting that sediments in the same sample were deposited at different times, rather than all at the same time. As mentioned above, the megafauna bones contain undetectable amounts of protein, so direct dating of the bones has so far been unsuccessful.

The uniqueness of archaeological and palaeontological finds from Cuddie Springs and its unusual stratigraphy have attracted detailed critiques that cast doubt on the integrity of the human-megafauna coexistence. Despite these problems, Cuddie Springs is uniquely significant as a major focus of research into the question of how the Australian megafauna became extinct.
