= Finch County =

Finch
- Cadastral division
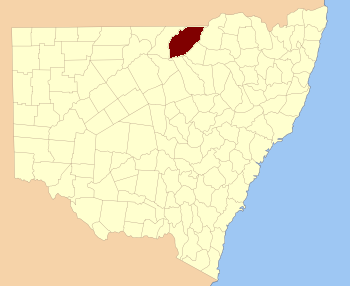
- Location in New South Wales
- Country: Australia
- State: New South Wales
Lands administrative divisions around Finch
Queensland	Queensland	Queensland
Narran	Finch	Benarba
Clyde	Leichhardt	Denham

Finch County is one of the 141 cadastral divisions of New South Wales. It is bounded by the Narran River in the west, the Barwon River to the south and east, and the Queensland border to the north. It includes Lightning Ridge.

Finch County was named in honour of surveyor Heneage Finch, the grandson of Heneage Finch, 3rd Earl of Aylesford.

== Parishes within this county ==
A full list of parishes found within this county; their current LGA and mapping coordinates to the approximate centre of each location is as follows:

Parish	LGA	Coordinates
Bagot	Walgett Shire	29°05′46″S 148°39′44″E
Baloon	Walgett Shire	29°00′55″S 148°36′21″E
Barnbah	Walgett Shire	29°54′45″S 147°45′24″E
Barrangeel	Walgett Shire	29°27′16″S 148°03′55″E
Bibble	Moree Plains Shire	29°07′28″S 148°50′55″E
Bimber	Walgett Shire	29°49′43″S 147°57′07″E
Birben	Walgett Shire	29°17′09″S 147°51′08″E
Birrah	Walgett Shire	29°13′26″S 148°02′04″E
Blackwood	Walgett Shire	29°38′29″S 147°36′58″E
Bloxsome	Walgett Shire	29°28′12″S 148°09′35″E
Bogra	Walgett Shire	29°54′29″S 147°52′09″E
Bon Bon	Walgett Shire	29°53′36″S 148°00′58″E
Boorara	Walgett Shire	29°01′30″S 148°29′08″E
Boorooma	Walgett Shire	30°00′44″S 147°29′08″E
Borah	Walgett Shire	29°39′00″S 148°08′00″E
Buddah	Walgett Shire	29°48′14″S 147°34′45″E
Buggee	Walgett Shire	29°33′08″S 147°59′26″E
Bukkulla	Walgett Shire	29°24′02″S 148°25′06″E
Bumble	Walgett Shire	29°07′43″S 148°10′56″E
Bundabarrina	Walgett Shire	29°39′08″S 148°24′29″E
Bundah	Walgett Shire	29°36′14″S 148°08′30″E
Bunghill	Walgett Shire	29°47′17″S 147°43′21″E
Burbah	Walgett Shire	29°01′08″S 148°17′25″E
Burrabebe	Walgett Shire	29°23′02″S 147°54′30″E
Burran Burran	Walgett Shire	29°11′25″S 148°42′14″E
Burrandown	Walgett Shire	29°01′25″S 148°50′41″E
Burrawandool	Walgett Shire	29°07′09″S 148°27′50″E
Calmuldi	Walgett Shire	29°44′46″S 148°20′58″E
Cambo Cambo	Walgett Shire	29°05′41″S 148°33′23″E
Campbell	Walgett Shire	29°39′13″S 148°13′32″E
Collarindabri	Walgett Shire	29°32′03″S 148°35′13″E
Combadery	Walgett Shire	30°00′02″S 147°58′29″E
Coocoran	Walgett Shire	29°26′41″S 147°44′35″E
Coogarah	Walgett Shire	29°34′41″S 147°52′47″E
Corona	Walgett Shire	29°45′42″S 147°27′59″E
Cowelba	Walgett Shire	29°22′00″S 148°20′20″E
Cumborah	Walgett Shire	29°45′50″S 147°43′50″E
Cunnianna	Walgett Shire	29°33′17″S 148°18′46″E
Currall	Walgett Shire	29°38′56″S 147°26′34″E
Daraaba	Walgett Shire	29°04′57″S 148°16′04″E
Deripas	Walgett Shire	29°31′29″S 148°03′40″E
Dungalear	Walgett Shire	29°49′16″S 148°15′15″E
Dungell	Walgett Shire	29°21′43″S 148°05′46″E
Dunumbral	Walgett Shire	29°30′54″S 148°13′47″E
Durabeba	Walgett Shire	29°32′25″S 147°53′54″E
Eales	Walgett Shire	29°58′17″S 147°38′02″E
Eckford	Walgett Shire	29°18′23″S 148°39′04″E
Elphinstone	Walgett Shire	29°12′51″S 147°53′53″E
Eulan	Walgett Shire	29°20′37″S 147°58′09″E
Euminbah	Walgett Shire	29°54′34″S 148°09′17″E
Eurawin	Walgett Shire	29°40′50″S 147°52′39″E
Finch	Walgett Shire	29°23′36″S 147°39′52″E
Gamalally	Walgett Shire	29°20′49″S 148°32′22″E
Gingie	Walgett Shire	29°58′10″S 148°03′24″E
Glatherindi	Walgett Shire	29°36′30″S 148°23′16″E
Gooningeri	Walgett Shire	29°22′51″S 148°15′31″E
Gooraway	Walgett Shire	29°35′10″S 148°01′34″E
Gordon	Walgett Shire	29°44′20″S 148°03′59″E
Gorie Gorie	Walgett Shire	29°52′32″S 147°45′33″E
Grawin	Walgett Shire	29°31′11″S 147°40′04″E
Greaves	Walgett Shire	29°02′30″S 148°05′59″E
Green	Walgett Shire	29°29′56″S 148°30′36″E
Gummanaldi	Walgett Shire	29°18′25″S 148°20′45″E
Gundabloui	Walgett Shire	29°12′26″S 148°34′39″E
Gurilly	Walgett Shire	29°32′46″S 147°30′22″E
Gurley	Walgett Shire	29°32′03″S 147°48′25″E
Hungerford	Walgett Shire	29°45′52″S 148°16′28″E
Imbergee	Walgett Shire	unknown
Kee Kee	Walgett Shire	29°46′44″S 147°57′15″E
Keilmoi	Walgett Shire	29°02′00″S 148°11′33″E
Kennedy	Walgett Shire	29°17′54″S 148°27′04″E
Kigwigil	Walgett Shire	29°40′55″S 147°37′32″E
Kurragong	Walgett Shire	29°58′22″S 147°31′34″E
Langloh	Walgett Shire	29°22′14″S 147°49′21″E
Llanillo	Walgett Shire	29°35′39″S 147°56′15″E
Lolleep	Walgett Shire	29°52′26″S 147°38′57″E
Maggarie	Walgett Shire	29°08′54″S 147°56′49″E
Manning	Walgett Shire	29°43′27″S 147°35′16″E
Mebea	Walgett Shire	29°24′27″S 147°54′11″E
Mein	Walgett Shire	29°35′24″S 147°36′05″E
Milrea	Walgett Shire	30°03′00″S 147°37′16″E
Mogil Mogul	Walgett Shire	29°23′39″S 148°38′05″E
Moongulla	Walgett Shire	29°27′28″S 148°19′31″E
Mooni	Walgett Shire	29°02′37″S 148°43′32″E
Mooroo	Walgett Shire	29°51′28″S 148°05′19″E
Moramina	Walgett Shire	29°52′40″S 147°54′27″E
Morendah	Walgett Shire	29°33′34″S 147°42′22″E
Mullingowba	Walgett Shire	29°12′17″S 148°19′45″E
Mundoo	Walgett Shire	29°14′59″S 148°10′08″E
Mureabun	Walgett Shire	29°36′32″S 147°28′10″E
Narran	Walgett Shire	29°02′30″S 148°23′03″E
Peelborough	Walgett Shire	29°25′04″S 148°11′43″E
Pine	Walgett Shire	29°39′48″S 147°33′08″E
Pinegobla	Walgett Shire	29°15′58″S 148°15′39″E
Plumbolah	Walgett Shire	29°48′01″S 147°50′08″E
Queega	Walgett Shire	29°29′19″S 147°49′43″E
Rose	Walgett Shire	29°43′43″S 147°56′51″E
Scott	Walgett Shire	30°01′59″S 147°50′15″E
Somerville	Walgett Shire	29°36′59″S 148°13′31″E
Talawa	Walgett Shire	29°12′16″S 148°10′43″E
Telinebone	Walgett Shire	29°49′54″S 147°50′46″E
Tomorrago	Walgett Shire	29°22′33″S 148°01′28″E
Townday	Walgett Shire	29°06′41″S 148°45′26″E
Tutawa	Walgett Shire	29°11′36″S 148°07′29″E
Ulah	Walgett Shire	30°01′11″S 147°43′42″E
Urandool	Walgett Shire	29°41′21″S 148°02′52″E
Wallah	Walgett Shire	29°36′18″S 148°18′18″E
Wallangulla	Walgett Shire	29°27′47″S 147°58′33″E
Wammell	Walgett Shire	29°25′53″S 147°49′00″E
Waugh	Walgett Shire	29°49′19″S 148°05′44″E
Wee Warra	Walgett Shire	29°42′06″S 147°44′25″E
Werribilla	Walgett Shire	29°27′21″S 148°38′17″E
Wilby Wilby	Walgett Shire	29°26′18″S 147°36′04″E
Wilga	Walgett Shire	29°43′14″S 148°10′55″E
Wilkie	Walgett Shire	29°52′22″S 147°32′26″E
Wooburrabebe	Walgett Shire	29°16′29″S 148°00′06″E
Yarraman	Walgett Shire	29°29′33″S 148°23′41″E
Yeranbah	Walgett Shire	29°04′53″S 148°06′56″E
Yerangle	Walgett Shire	29°47′42″S 148°11′30″E
Yourblah	Walgett Shire	29°19′09″S 148°06′20″E
