= Castlereagh League =

Rugby league competition in Australia

Castlereagh Rugby League
- Sport: Rugby league
- Formerly known as: Group 14
- Inaugural season: 1949
- Ceased: 1999
- Re-formed: 2001
- Number of teams: 13 (9 in first grade)
- Country: Australia
- Premiers: Cobar (2026)
- Most titles: Coonamble (18 titles)

The Castlereagh League (also known as the Castlereagh Cup and formerly as Group 14 Rugby League) is a rugby league competition in western New South Wales, Australia For all intents and purposes the competition is effectively the Group 14 Rugby League senior competition, and the league has re-obtained Group status as of 2023, but will not revert to the Group 14 name for branding reasons. In 2025, the competition ran a first grade and reserve grade competition in men's, and women's league tag.

== Teams ==
Locations of the Castlereagh Cup clubs.

The following clubs fielded at least one team across the three Castlereagh League grades:

Castlereagh Cup Clubs	Moniker	Premierships	Premiership Years	1st	Res	WLT	Youth
Castlereagh League clubs
Baradine	Magpies	10	1951, 1952, 1953, 1954, 1955, 1968, 1969, 1979, 1993, 1995	Yes	Yes	Yes	No
Binnaway	Bombshells	1	2004	No	Yes	No	Yes
Cobar	Roosters	1	2022	Yes	Yes	Yes	Yes
Coolah	Kangaroos	4	1963, 1965, 2024, 2025	Yes	Yes	Yes	No
Coonabarabran	Unicorns	13	1950, 1961, 1962, 1964, 1966, 1970, 1972, 1977, 1980, 1988, 1990, 1994, 2019	Yes	Yes	Yes	No
Coonamble	Bears	18	1949, 1957, 1958, 1959, 1971, 1974, 1978, 1982, 1991, 1996, 1999, 2002, 2003, 2005, 2009	Yes	Yes	Yes	No
Dunedoo	Swans	3	1967, 2014, 2020	Yes	No	Yes	No
Gilgandra	Panthers	11	1956, 1981, 1986, 1987, 1997, 2001, 2011, 2013, 2016, 2017, 2018	No	No	Yes	No
Gulgong	Terriers	1	2015	Yes	Yes	Yes	Yes
Mendooran	Tigers	3	1983, 1984, 1985	No	Yes	No	No
Narromine	Jets	0	None	Yes	Yes	Yes	Yes
Warren	Bulldogs	2	2010, 2012	Yes	Yes	Yes	Yes

=== Former Teams ===
Team	Moniker	Notes	Premierships
Gulargambone	Galahs	Folded 2008	None
Mudgee	Tigers	Moved to Group 10	1960, 1973, 1975, 1976
Merriwa	Magpies	Moved to Group 21	None
Nyngan	Tigers	Moved to Group 11 Rugby League	1989
Orana	Googars	Folded	1992
Tambar Springs		Folded	None
Tottenham	Turtles	Folded	None
Trangie	Magpies	Folded 2022	None
Walgett	Dragons	Moved to Barwon Darling Rugby League	None

== Premierships ==
Season	Premiers	Score	Runners-up	Grand final host	Minor premiers	Teams
Formation of Group 14 Rugby League.
1949	Coonamble		Baradine			
1950	Coonabarabran	14–0	Coonamble	Baradine		8
1951	Baradine	10–3	Coonabarabran	Mendooran	Coonabarabran	
1952	Baradine	8–5	Gilgandra	Coonabarabran		9
1953	Baradine	9–2	Mudgee	Dunedoo	Baradine	11 (Note: Total includes Coolah, Gulgong, and Coonamble, who all withdrew during the regular season.)
1954	Baradine	16–2	Coonabarabran	Binnaway		8
1955	Baradine					
1956	Gilgandra	13–0	Binnaway			
1957	Coonamble	11–4	Baradine			
1958	Coonamble	8–5	Mudgee			
1959	Coonamble		Mudgee			
1960	Mudgee	11–10	Coonamble			
1961	Coonabarabran					
1962	Coonabarabran					
1963	Coolah	3–2	Gilgandra			
1964	Coonabarabran	10–7	Gilgandra			
1965	Coolah	9–5	Mudgee			
1966	Coonabarabran		Baradine			
1967	Dunedoo	16–8 (replay)	Coonabarabran			
1968	Baradine	17–10	Dunedoo			
1969	Baradine	10–9	Coonabarabran			
1970	Coonabarabran	22–7	Gulgong			
1971	Coonamble	31–4	Coonabarabran			
1972	Coonabarabran	26–8	Baradine			
1973	Mudgee	8–6	Coonamble			
1974	Coonamble	19–14	Dunedoo			
1975	Mudgee	15–10	Baradine			
1976	Mudgee	33–17	Gilgandra			
1977	Coonabarabran	6–5	Gilgandra			
1978	Coonamble	13–10	Coonabarabran			
1979	Baradine	16–6	Coonabarabran			
1980	Coonabarabran	16–15	Gilgandra			
1981	Gilgandra	19–5	Baradine			
1982	Coonamble	16–8	Coonabarabran			
1983	Mendooran	40–22	Baradine		Mendooran	7
1984	Mendooran	64–4	Coonamble			
1985	Mendooran	24–20	Cobar			
1986	Gilgandra	14–6	Cobar			
1987	Gilgandra	23–16 (a.e.t.)	Nyngan			
1988	Coonabarabran	38–18	Dunedoo			
1989	Nyngan	37–12	Coonabarabran			
1990	Coonabarabran	32–22	Orana			
1991	Coonamble	30–20	Baradine			
1992	Orana	30–20	Coonamble			
1993	Baradine	16–14	Coonamble			
1994	Coonabarabran	22–18	Coonamble			7
1995	Baradine	40–14	Coonamble			4
1996	Coonamble	36–28	Nyngan			
1997	Gilgandra	33–20	Walgett	Gilgandra	Walgett	6
Competition in recess in 1998
1999	Coonamble	29–24	Nyngan			
Competition in recess in 2000.
Group 14 Rugby League rebranded to Castlereagh Cup.
2001	Gilgandra	36–4	Coonamble			8
2002	Coonamble	36–26	Dunedoo			8
2003	Coonamble	70–24	Baradine		Coonamble	5
2004	Binnaway	32–26	Gulargambone		Binnaway	7
2005	Coonamble	34–24	Binnaway		Coonamble	6
2006	Coonamble	44–22	Warren		Coonamble	6
2007	Coonamble	36–16	Baradine		Coonamble	5
2008	Coonamble	40–32	Baradine		Coonamble	5
2009	Coonamble	32–26	Gilgandra		Gilgandra	6
2010	Warren	46–20	Coonamble		Warren	7
2011	Gilgandra	28–24	Warren		Warren	7
2012	Warren	47–32	Coonabarabran		Coonabarabran	7
2013	Gilgandra	30–24	Coonabarabran	Coonabarabran	Coonabarabran	8
2014	Dunedoo	32–12	Coonamble	Dunedoo	Dunedoo	8
2015	Gulgong	40–14	Gilgandra		Coonamble	6
2016	Gilgandra	28–22	Gulgong	Gilgandra	Coonamble	9
2017	Gilgandra	46–10	Coonamble	Gilgandra	Gilgandra	8
2018	Gilgandra	31–30	Gulgong		Gulgong	8
2019	Coonabarabran	32–22	Gilgandra		Coonabarabran	9
2020	Dunedoo	16–10	Gilgandra	Gilgandra	Dunedoo	5
Competition abandoned due to COVID-19 pandemic.
2022	Cobar	28–26	Gilgandra		Narromine	7
2023	Gulgong	10–4	Cobar	Gulgong	Gulgong	9
2024	Coolah	32–8	Cobar	Cobar	Coolah	8
2025	Coolah	24–18	Coonabarabran	Coolah	Coolah	9
2026	Cobar	22–4	Coolah	Cobar	Cobar	9

== Group 14 Juniors ==
=== Current Teams ===
- Baradine Junior Sports Club
- Coolah Junior Sports Club
- Coonabarabran JRLFC
- Coonamble JRLFC
- Dunedoo Junior Rugby League and Netball Association
- Gilgandra Junior Rugby League and Netball Association
- Gulgong Junior Rugby League and Netball Club
- Walgett Dragons JRLC (Seniors play in Barwon Darling)

=== Former Structure ===
The competition was formerly divided into Eastern and Western divisions. The following clubs fielded teams in the 2006 Group 14 Eastern junior competition:

- Binnaway (fields a senior team in the Castlereagh Cup)
- Coolah (rejoined as of 2024)
- Dunedoo (fields a senior team in the Castlereagh Cup)
- Gulgong (fields a senior team in the Castlereagh Cup)
- Merriwa (fields a senior team in Group 21)

While these clubs fielded teams in the 2006 Group 14 Western junior competition:

- Baradine (fields a senior team in the Castlereagh Cup)
- Coonabarabran (fields a senior team in the Castlereagh Cup)
- Coonamble (fields a senior team in the Castlereagh Cup)
- Gilgandra (fields a senior team in the Castlereagh Cup)
- Nyngan (fields a senior team in Group 11)

== See also ==
- Rugby League Competitions in Australia

== External links and Sources ==
- Latest Castlereagh Cup table – from Sporting Pulse
- Castlereagh Cup on Country Rugby League's official site
- Rugby League Week at State Library of NSW Research and Collections
- Group 14 on Country Rugby League's official site
- Rugby League Week at State Library of NSW Research and Collections
