= Ricky Walford =

Australian rugby league footballer

Personal information
- Born: 8 December 1963 (age 62) Walgett, New South Wales, Australia

Playing information
- Position: Wing
Club
Years	Team	Pld	T	G	FG	P
1982–83	Eastern Suburbs	13	4	6	0	24
1984	North Sydney	11	8	21	0	74
1985–96	St. George	207	104	229	0	874
	Total	231	116	256	0	972
Representative
Years	Team	Pld	T	G	FG	P
1989–90	NSW Country	2	2	5	0	18
1990	New South Wales	1	0	0	0	0

Ricky Walford (born 8 December 1963) is an Indigenous Australian former professional and state representative rugby league footballer who played in the 1980s and 1990s. He played for the Sydney Roosters, North Sydney Bears and the St. George Dragons. He was a goal-kicking Winger.

== Club career ==
Born in the northern New South Wales town of Collarenebri, Walford was raised by his grandparents in the larger nearby town of Walgett. He was selected from Walgett as an Australian schoolboy representative and toured New Zealand in 1981.

In 1982 Walford moved to Sydney, joined Eastern Suburbs Roosters and made thirteen appearances for the tri-colours in 1982 and 1983. He made his first grade debut in round 2 of the 1982 season and kicked two goals coming from the bench, going on to score three tries and kicking four goals in seven appearances. Walford played in only six games in 1983 for the Roosters, scoring no tries or goals. He then moved north of Sydney Harbour in 1984 and played 11 games for the North Sydney Bears, scoring eight tries and kicking 21 goals.

In his day Ricky Walford was one of a dying breed of 'toe poke' goalkickers in top-line rugby league. He was an old style direct kicker of the ball rather than using an 'around-the-corner' style that gives the kicker greater accuracy, and has proved popular since Englishman John Gray introduced the style to Australia when he joined the Bears in 1975.

=== St. George Career ===
Walford joined the St. George Dragons in 1985 but only played two games for the season and missed out on the Dragons' 6–7 loss to Canterbury-Bankstown in the Grand Final at the Sydney Cricket Ground. He cemented his place on the wing for St. George in the 1986 season and scored nine tries in 17 games to be the club's leading try scorer.

After an injury interrupted 1987 season where he only played 14 of the Dragons' 26 games, Walford enjoyed some of his best form and his best ever points haul in 1988. Playing 22 games he was the club's leading try and point scorer with 15 tries and 52 of 89 goals kicked for a total of 164 points scored. Walford was also a member of the victorious St. George Dragons team that won the 1988 Panasonic Cup.

In an 11-year career with the famous St. George club Walford played 207 games. He scored 104 tries and kicked 229 goals. He played on the wing in both of the 1992 and 1993 Grand Final losses to the Brisbane Broncos at the Sydney Football Stadium and was the NSWRL's leading point scorer in 1989 when he scored 146 points (equal with Balmain's English import Andy Currier). Walford crossed the line for 13 tries and kicked 47 goals from 75 attempts. Walford had his biggest point scoring day in round 19 of 1989 at the Dragons' home ground Kogarah Oval when he crossed for four tries and kicked five goals against Canterbury in a 32-2 romp over the reigning premiers.

Walford's 874 career points for St. George stood in second place behind Graeme Langlands on the club's all-time highest score tally. He retired from St. George at the end of the 1995 season but made himself available to play for the Red V in the 1996 season as a result of troubles during the Super League war. He subsequently retired again at season's end. Walford's final game for the club was their 16-14 upset victory over Canberra in the 1996 qualifying final.

== Representative career ==
During 1989, Walford started to be noticed by the representative selectors and he was selected on the wing for Country Origin and NSW Origin. He played in the first game of the 1990 Origin series before missing games two and three through injury. He also represented an Australian Aboriginal side on a tour of Tonga in 1990 and at the 1990 Pacific Cup.

Walford is now Indigenous Development Manager at the Australian Rugby League.

== Post-playing ==
After retiring, Walford became the Indigenous Program Manager for the Australian Rugby League's development function.

He was awarded Life Membership of the St. George Dragons in 1996.
