= Come By Chance =

Come By Chance may refer to:

- Come By Chance, New South Wales, Australia
- Come By Chance, Newfoundland and Labrador, Canada

== See also ==
- Come By Chance Refinery
