= 2CUZ =

Coordinates: 30°05′20″S 145°56′16″E

- Bourke, New South Wales, Australia; Australia
- Frequency: 106.5 MHz FM
- Branding: Talking on the breeze

Ownership
- Owner: (Muda Aboriginal Corporation)

History
- First air date: 1996

Technical information
- Class: Community
- Repeaters: 97.7 FM Goodooga, New South Wales; 96.1 FM Lightning Ridge, New South Wales; 102.7 FM Walgett, New South Wales; 100.5 FM Weilmoringle, New South Wales

Links
- Webcast: http://us4new.listen2myradio.com:2199/start/mudaabor
- Website: http://www.2cuzfm.com

2CUZ FM is an Indigenous community radio station in the North-Western NSW town of Bourke. It has been on air since 1996. The station broadcasts to the regional towns of Brewarrina, Goodooga, Lightning Ridge, Walgett and Weilmoringle . The idea for the development of 2CUZ came from Greg McKellar and other powerful Aboriginal leaders who could see that their community needed more positive portrayals of Aboriginal people. In 1999 Muda Aboriginal Corporation commenced broadcasting and received its full radio licence in 2004. The station now has a full licence and broadcasts 24 hours a day.

== Principles ==
2CUZ prides itself in maintaining a community feel, as well as keeping the Indigenous and wider community up to date with current issues and local information.

The Board and Staff strongly believes in training and educating local youth about Indigenous media. "as this is not only a confidence boost, but also builds skills and offers our youth exposure to radio".

== Awards ==
The station was awarded a Deadly Vibe award in 2001.

== Studios ==
2CUZ FM broadcasts from studios in Bourke to the following locations:

- Bourke & Brewarrina 106.5 FM
- Goodooga 97.7 FM
- Lightning Ridge 96.1 FM
- Walgett 102.7 FM
- Wellmoringle 100.5 FM
