= Cumborah =

Cumborah New South Wales
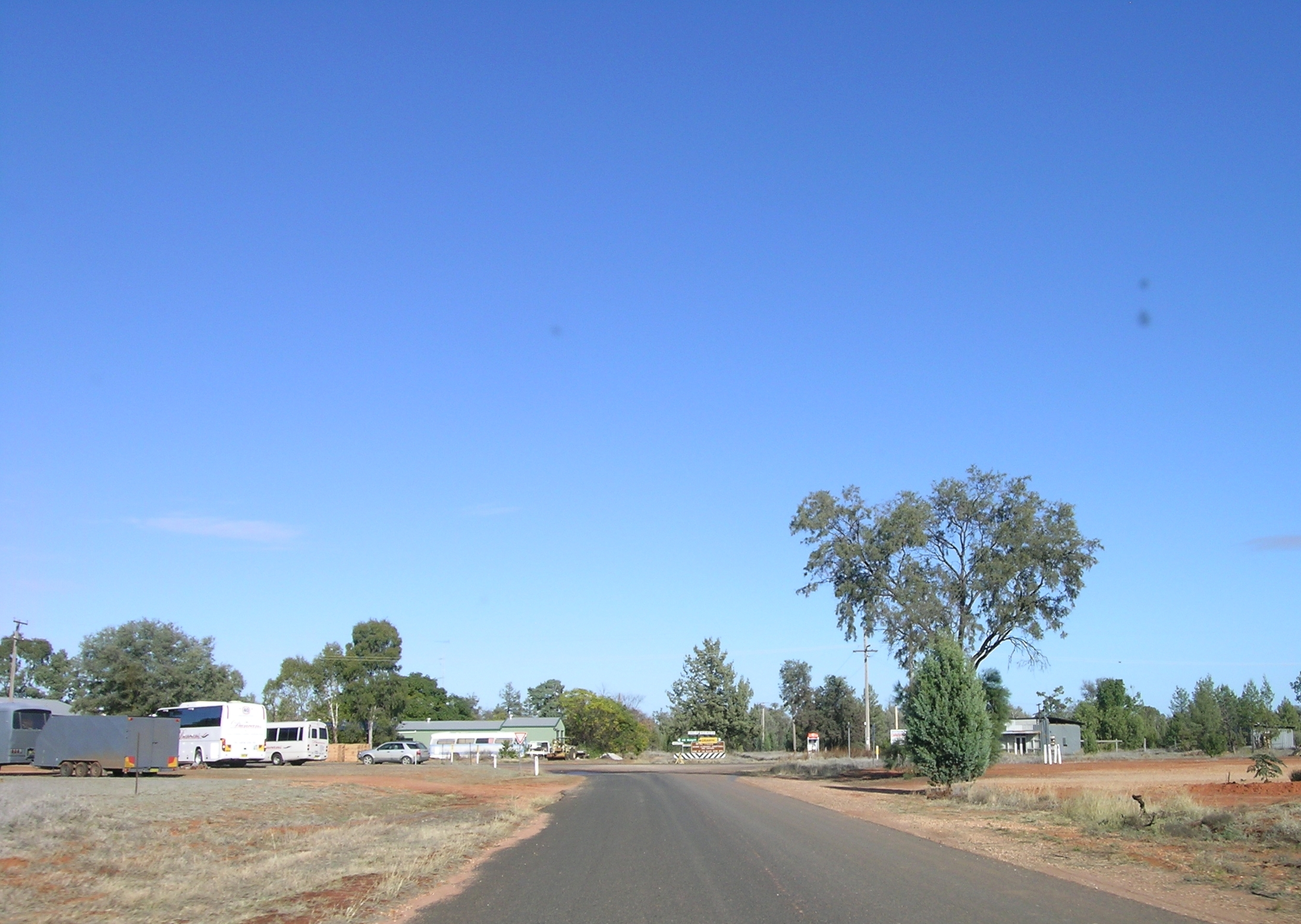
- The main intersection in Cumborah.

- Coordinates: 29°44′0″S 147°47′0″E
- Population: 492 (2006 census)
- Established: 1896
- Postcode(s): 2832
- Elevation: 163 m (535 ft)
- Location: 48 km (30 mi) NW of Walgett; 50 km (31 mi) SW of Lightning Ridge
- LGA(s): Walgett Shire
- County: Finch
- State electorate(s): Barwon
- Federal division(s): Parkes

Cumborah is a town in north-western New South Wales, Australia. The town is in the Walgett Shire local government area, near the opal fields of Lightning Ridge. Cumborah is about 36 kilometres (22 mi) off the Castlereagh Highway and is served by the commercial centres of Lightning Ridge and Walgett, 48 kilometres (30 mi) to the south-east.

The road through Cumborah is the main route to the nearby Glengarry, Grawin and Sheepyard opal fields. Other prospectors also search nearby for agate, fossils, petrified wood, topaz and other semi-precious stones. The village is almost surrounded by mulga and cypress scrubland.

== Population ==
In the 2006 census Cumborah and the surrounding region had a population of 492 persons, 63.6% were males and 36.4% were females, including 33 indigenous persons and 386 persons born in Australia (78.5%). Their main form of employment was in sheep, beef cattle and grain farming (42.9%) followed by non-metallic mineral mining.

== History ==
In 1896 Cumborah was proclaimed a town and the local police station operated from 1898 until 1934. A small mail receiving office opened in 1892; this was upgraded to a post office in 1898 which was closed in 1963. The village had a provisional school from 1899 to 1903 and a public school from 1904 until 1943. A telephone office opened in 1901 and a manual exchange in 1912. By 1915 Cumborah had five telephone subscribers that could only contact Walgett or Dangar Bridge. From 1917 it was possible to telephone other local towns.

Early entertainment in Cumborah was provided by participating in or watching cricket, horseracing, sports days and tennis.

In the 2006 census there were 315 occupied private dwellings in Cumborah and the surrounding area: 80.0% were separate houses and 20.0% were other dwellings.
