= Carinda =

- Town
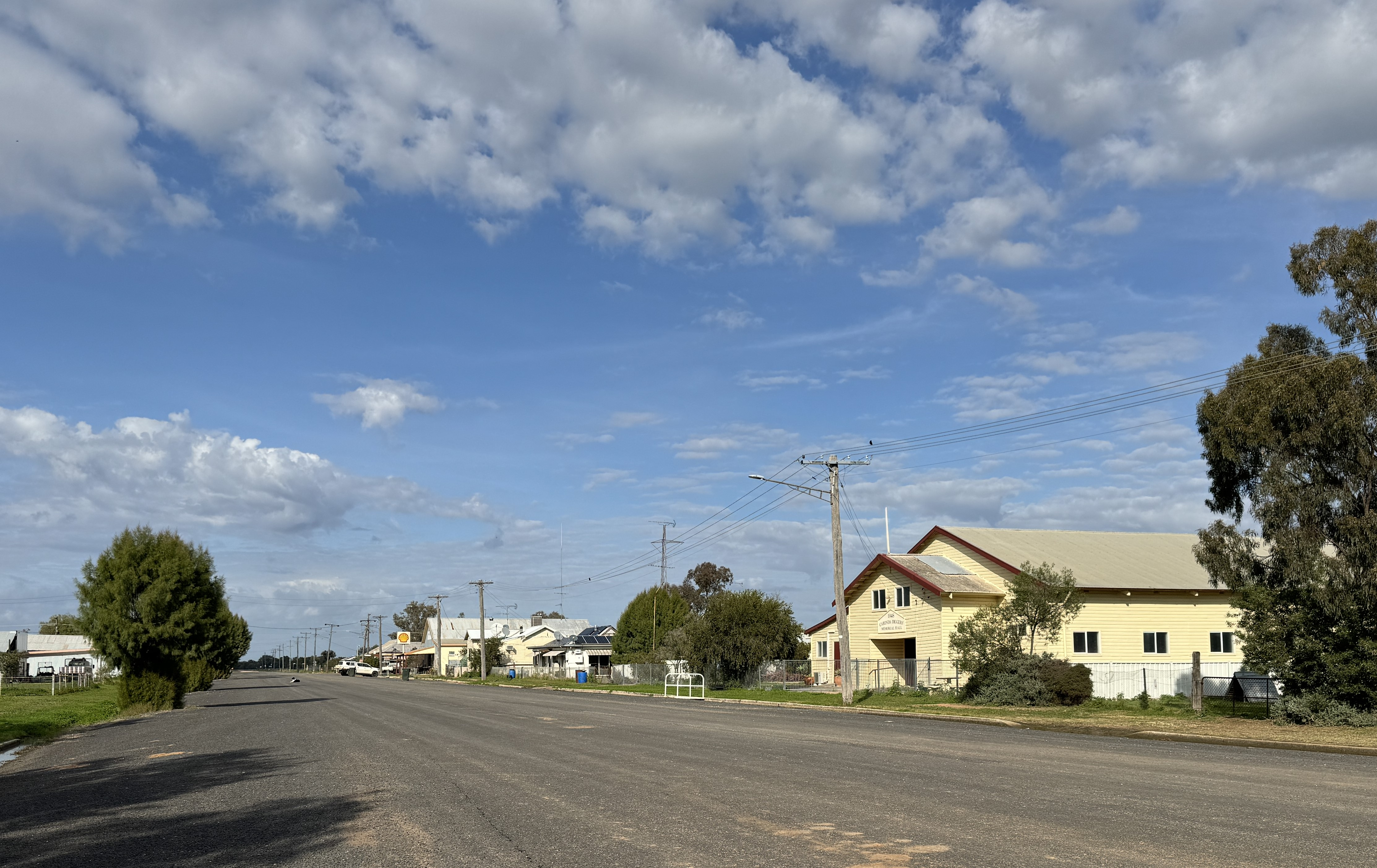
- Colin St, the main street of Corinda

- Coordinates: 30°28′0″S 147°41′0″E
- Country: Australia
- State: New South Wales
- LGA: Walgett Shire
- Location: 651 km (405 mi) NW of Sydney; 276 km (171 mi) NW of Dubbo; 119 km (74 mi) SE of Brewarrina; 70 km (43 mi) SW of Walgett

Government
  - State electorate: Barwon
  - Federal division: Parkes
- Elevation: 134 m (440 ft)

Population
  - Total: 165 (2021 census)
- Postcode: 2831

Carinda is a town in the north of New South Wales, Australia. The town is in the Walgett Shire local government area. In 2021, the town had a population of 165.

The name of the town is derived from an Aboriginal word meaning 'you carry'.

== History ==
In 1818 John Oxley and George Evans arrived north of Warren and attempted to travel downstream along the Macquarie River. Unseasonal rains and swollen rivers overflowing into marsh country soon turned them back, lending credence to their conviction that there was an inland sea. For ten years the mystery of the inland sea remained unsolved. When Charles Sturt ventured into the interior in 1828-29 he endeavoured to verify Oxley's findings. However, it became evident that there was no inland sea, and that all the inland rivers did flow into the Darling River.

Settlers came into the Carinda District in the mid 1800s, settling along the waterways.

Thomas McNamara acquired 16,000 acres (6,500 ha) of land which became Carinda Station. He built a dwelling on the nearby Marthaguy Creek where he ran a hotel and a store around which a small village grew. It is believed the name Carinda is derived from an early 'run' west of the present town called 'Currundy.' In 1908 the Carinda Bore was sunk, enabling people to move away from the creek. A second settlement, known as the "Top End", grew up where present-day Carinda is situated.

== Present day ==
The population of Carinda has decreased significantly and in 2021 stood at around 165. In the 2021 Census, 75.2% of people were recorded as having been born in Australia and 78.8% of people only spoke English at home.

The general store, which also served as a post office and café, closed down in August 2014 and post office duties have since been taken up by the local service station.

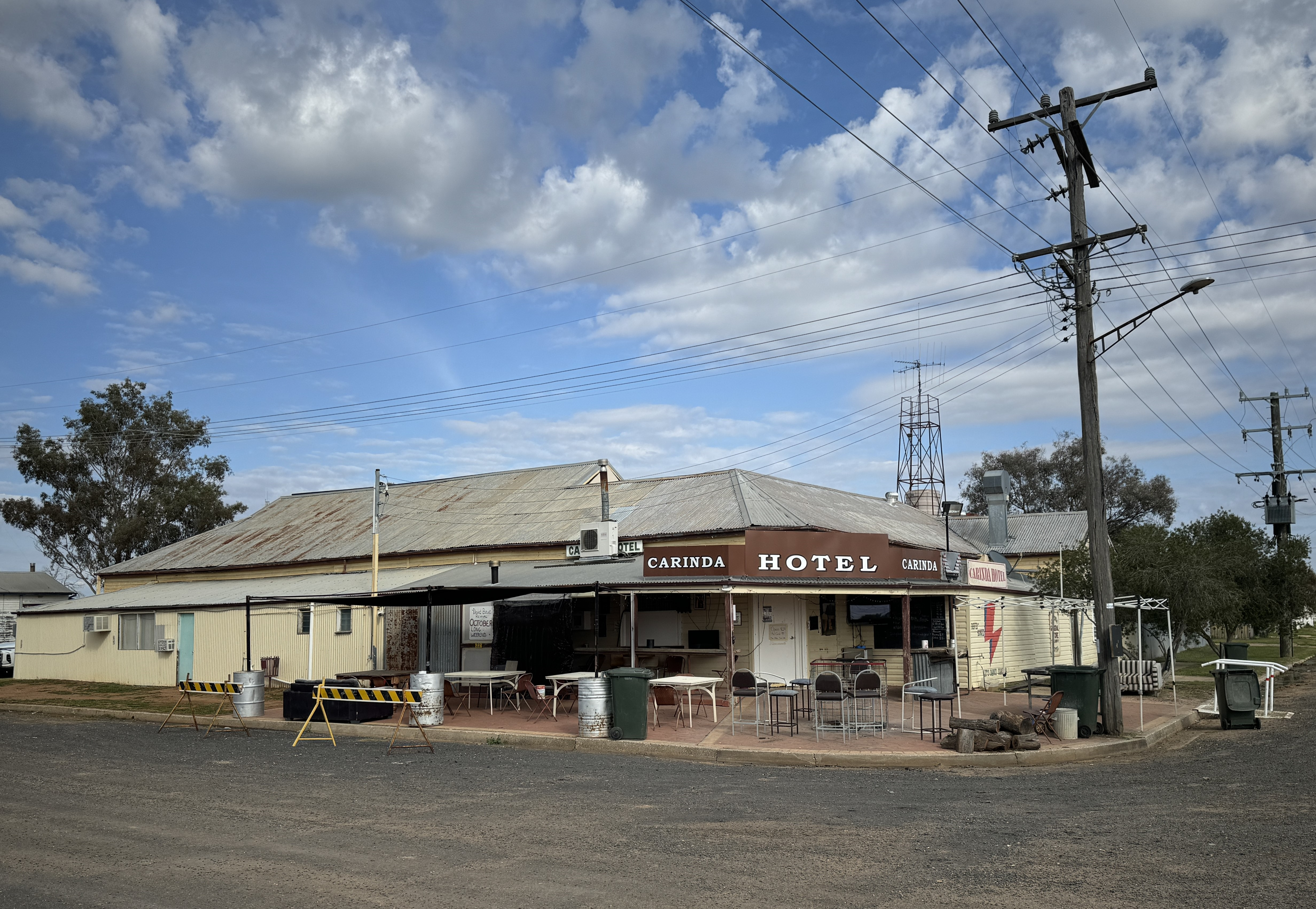
Carinda Hotel, where part of the music video of "Let's Dance" was filmed

In February 1983, the town was used as a filming location for the music video for singer David Bowie's 1983 single "Let's Dance", centering on the Carinda Hotel. The connection to Bowie has been proposed as a basis for plans to revitalize the town.

In addition to the hotel, there is a 12-hole golf course with a golf club that operates on Friday and Saturday nights.

Carinda's biggest event of the year is its picnic horse racing meeting, held each July.
