= Outback Radio 2WEB =

Radio station

2WEB
- Bourke, New South Wales; Australia
- Broadcast area: Bourke RA1
- Frequency: 585 kHz
- Branding: Outback Radio

Programming
- Format: Gold, Country

Ownership
- Owner: WREB Co-Operative Limited

History
- First air date: 13 November 1978
- Former frequencies: 576 kHz

Technical information
- Licensing authority: ACMA
- Class: Community radio
- Power: 10,000 watts
- Transmitter coordinates: 30.099721°S 145.981814°E
- Repeaters: 100.7 FM Nyngan, New South Wales; 91.1 FM Coonamble, New South Wales; 104.3 FM Walgett, New South Wales; 90.5 FM Lightning Ridge, New South Wales; 99.9 FM Wilcannia, New South Wales

Links
- Public licence information: Profile
- Webcast: Listen Live
- Website: outbackradio.com.au

Outback Radio 2WEB is an Australian community radio station broadcasting from Bourke, located in far western New South Wales, Australia. Its broadcast area serves the communities of Bourke, Cobar, Nyngan, Coonamble, Walgett, Lightning Ridge, Wilcannia and numerous smaller communities across western New South Wales, south-west Queensland and north-eastern South Australia.

== History ==
2WEB was established as a school project inside a small room at Bourke High School following a suggestion by science teacher Colin Elliott. Funding was provided from the Disadvantaged Country Area Program in 1977, with equipment installed and the first broadcasts reaching an audience within a 200-kilometre radius of the school grounds the following year.

2WEB commenced broadcasting on 13 November 1978. After several years of operation and fundraising, 2WEB moved to purpose-built premises in Oxley Street which it still occupies.

2WEB broadcasts across its licence area on 585 kHz AM together with five FM translator services serving Coonamble (91.1 FM), Lightning Ridge (90.5 FM), Nyngan (100.7 FM), Walgett (104.3 FM) and Wilcannia (99.9 FM).

In January 2018, 2WEB acquired and resumed publishing Bourke newspaper The Western Herald after its owners decided to cease publication in December 2017.

A new AM transmitter was purchased and installed after local MP Kevin Humphries announced funding of $85,000 in March 2018.

Later that year, funds were secured to rebuild the station's three studios with new digital broadcast and production facilities.

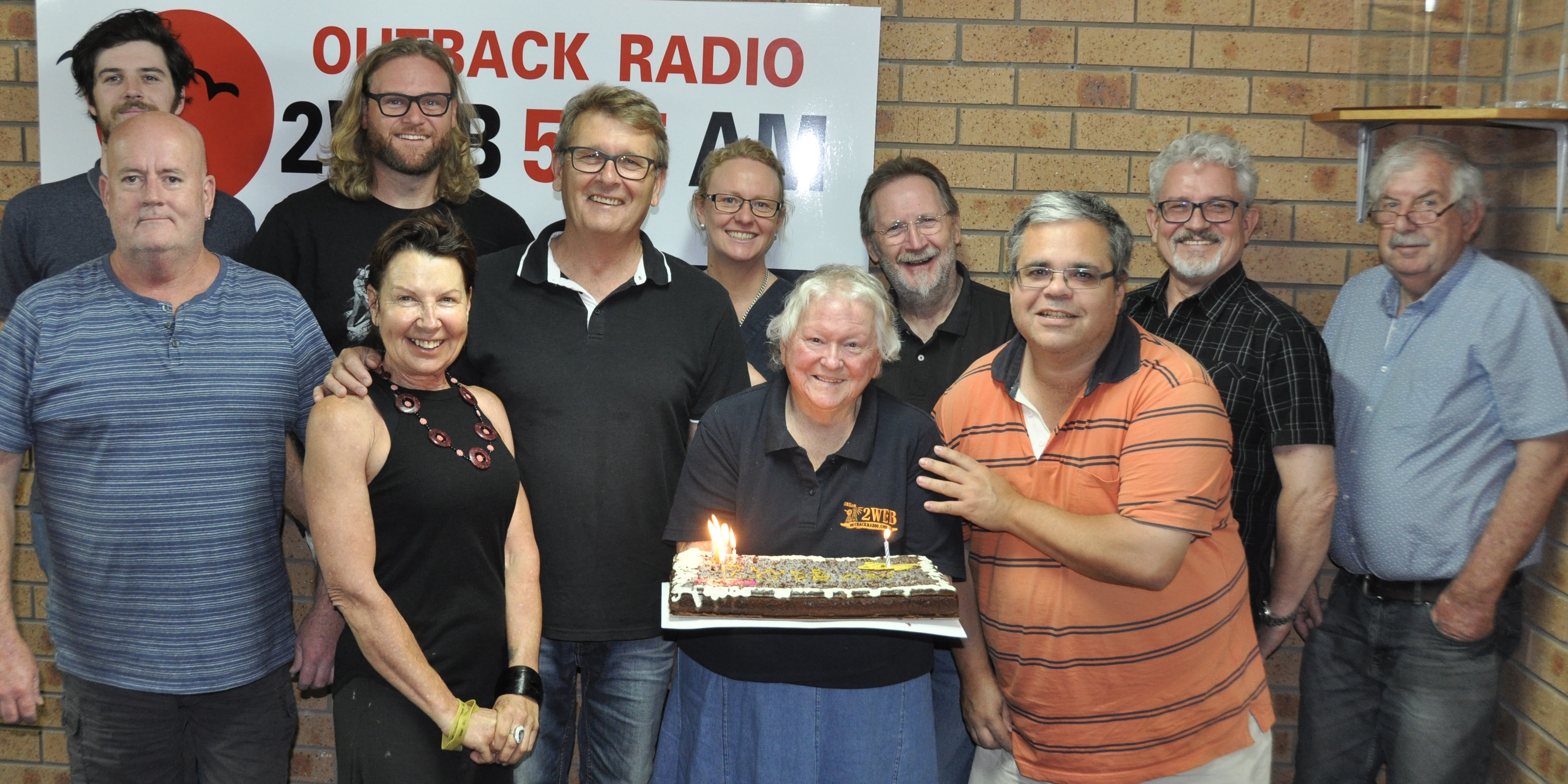
Staff members celebrating 2WEB's 40th anniversary: Matt Lynch, Rod Corfe, Ash Keenan, Tricia Duffield, Ian Cole, Tanya Mitchell, May Watkins, Neil Campbell, David Sharp, Marek Weiss and Chris Molyneaux, November 2018.

== Programming ==
Programming originates from the station's Bourke studios and consists primarily of classic hits and country music, together with locally produced regional news and national news supplied by Tapt Media.

In April 2014, 2WEB launched a local morning program, Outback Mornings, to replace the satellite program from 2UE which was broadcast since 1996, when John Laws held the shift.
