= Group 15 Rugby League =

Rugby competition in Australia

Barwon Darling Rugby League
- Sport: Rugby league
- Formerly known as: Group 15 Rugby League
- Inaugural season: 1949
- Ceased: 1992
- Re-formed: 2000s
- Number of teams: 6
- Premiers: Brewarrina (2024)
- Most titles: Bourke (13 titles)
- Website: Barwon Darling Rugby League; Barwon Darling Rugby League on facebook
- Related competition: Castlereagh Cup, Outback Rugby League

The Group 15 Rugby League, now known as Barwon Darling Rugby League Cup is a rugby league competition in Far North West NSW.

The competition has six teams from across Western NSW, with another currently in recess.

== History ==
Group 15 was a rugby league competition based in the northeastern quarter of the Western Division, New South Wales, Australia. The last premiership was held in 1992 with Lightning Ridge beating Bourke.

Group 15 clubs currently play in the revamped Barwon Darling Rugby League Cup, which is essentially a reformed Group 15 Premiership, run by the Country Rugby League as part of Region 4 (Western Rams).

=== Barwon Darling Rugby League Cup ===
The Barwon Darling Rugby League is the new competition held in the area following the demise of Group 15. Five former Group 15 clubs are involved, plus the more recently formed Newtown Wanderers club, with towns such as Bourke, Brewarrina, Goodooga, Lightning Ridge and Walgett (Dragons and Wanderers) entering teams. Collarenebri has also fielded sides in the past, but are currently in recess. The competition is the a key social event in most of the communities involved, as they are small rural townships.

The competition has been dominated by the Walgett Dragons and Bourke Warriors in recent years, with many premierships going to either one of the sides, with Brewarrina being the other consistently competitive side. Goodooga broke a 34 year title drought in 2022 defeating Bourke 27-26 to claim the title, before going back-to-back the following year.

== Teams ==
=== Barwon Darling Rugby League Cup Teams ===
| Team | Moniker | Town | Ground |
First Grade Clubs
| Brewarrina | Golden Googars | Brewarrina, New South Wales | Geoff New Oval |
| Collarenebri | Bulldogs | Collarenebri, New South Wales | Collarenebri Sportsground |
| Goodooga | Magpies | Goodooga, New South Wales | Magpie Oval |
| Walgett | Dragons | Walgett, New South Wales | Ricky Walford Oval |
Lower Grade Clubs
| Lightning Ridge | Redbacks | Lightning Ridge, New South Wales | Spider Brown Oval |

=== In Recess ===
| Team | Moniker | Town | Ground |
First Grade Clubs
| Bourke | Warriors | Bourke, New South Wales | Davidson Oval |
| Lightning Ridge | Redbacks | Lightning Ridge, New South Wales | Spider Brown Oval |

=== Former Group 15 teams included ===
- Barwon United (folded)
- Bourke Warriors
- Brewarrina Googars
- Canbelego
- Cobar Roosters (Now in Castlereagh League)
- Collarenebri Bulldogs
- Enngonia Outlaws
- Goodooga Magpies
- Lightning Ridge Redbacks
- Mungindi Grasshoppers
- Newtown Wanderers
- Nyngan Tigers (Now in Group 11/Peter McDonald Premiership)
- Walgett Dragons
- Warren Bulldogs (Now in Castlereagh League)

== Grand Finals ==
=== First grade ===
| Year | Premiers | Score | Runners-up | Grand final venue | Winning Coach | Minor Premiers |
|---|---|---|---|---|---|---|
Formation of Group 15 Rugby League
| 1949 | Cobar | 8–5 | Bourke | Bourke | | |
| 1950 | Cobar | 7–2 | Warren | Nyngan | | |
| 1951 | Cobar | 16–2 | Warren | | | Cobar |
| 1952 | | | | | | |
| 1953 | Trangie | 9–2 | Warren | Trangie | | Warren |
| 1954 | Cobar | | Nyngan | | | |
| 1955 | Cobar | | | | | |
| 1956 | | | | | | |
| 1957 | | | | | | |
| 1958 | Cobar | | | | | |
| 1959 | | | | | | |
| 1960 | Cobar | 33–7 | Brewarrina | Bourke | | Cobar |
| 1961 | Brewarrina | 26–5 | Nyngan | | | |
| 1962 | Brewarrina | 16–14 | Nyngan | Bourke | | |
| 1963 | | | | | | |
| 1964 | Brewarrina | 14–13 | Nyngan | | | |
| 1965 | Cobar | 16–11 | Goodooga | Bourke | | Goodooga |
| 1966 | Nyngan | | | | | |
| 1967 | Bourke | 10–7 | Brewarrina | | J. Mumbler | |
| 1968 | Cobar | 5–4 | Brewarrina | Nyngan | Brad Wynd | Brewarrina |
| 1969 | Brewarrina | 27–14 | Bourke | Nyngan | | Bourke |
| 1970 | Bourke | 26–5 | Brewarrina | Nyngan | | Bourke |
| 1971 | Cobar | 33–6 | Bourke | | Brian Lawrence | |
| 1972 | Cobar | 23–2 | Walgett | | Brian Lawrence | |
| 1973 | Walgett | 27–21 | Brewarrina | | | |
| 1974 | Bourke | 16–6 | Goodooga | Brewarinna | B. Hollman | Bourke |
| 1975 | Walgett | 16–11 | Brewarrina | Bourke | Ken Morgan | |
| 1976 | Bourke | 68–13 | Walgett | | | |
| 1977 | Cobar | 8–5 | Walgett | | Mick Bannister | |
| 1978 | Cobar | 21–0 | Goodooga | | Peter Fox | |
| 1979 | Nyngan | 28–12 | Goodooga | | | |
| 1980 | Goodooga | 16–12 | Nyngan | | Ron Mason | |
| 1981 | Bourke | 24–17 | Cobar | Nyngan | Fred Harvey | Bourke |
| 1982 | Bourke | 19–12 | Nyngan | | Alan Hamilton | |
| 1983 | Nyngan | 24–22 | Bourke | | G. Moore | |
| 1984 | Bourke | 56–0 | Nyngan | | | |
| 1984 | Goodooga | 26–6 | Mungindi | | | |
| 1985 | Goodooga | 28–24 | Brewarrina | | | |
| 1986 | Brewarrina | 38–24 | Goodooga | | | |
| 1987 | Bourke | 40–20 | Walgett | | Keith Harvey | |
| 1988 | Goodooga | 44–32 | Bourke | | John Stanton | |
| 1989 | Bourke | 32–29 | Walgett | | Tony Darigo | |
| 1990 | Bourke | 31–26 | Walgett | | Stephen Howlett | |
| 1991 | Walgett | 20–17 | Lightning Ridge | | Richie Simpson | |
| 1992 | Lightning Ridge | 38–6 | Bourke | | Ron Ferguson | |
Competition in recess between 1993-2011
Competition rebranded to Barwon Darling Rugby League
| 2012 | Bourke | 22–18 | Walgett | | | |
| 2013 | Walgett | 50–10 | Bourke | | | |
| 2014 | Walgett | 10–6 | Bourke | | | |
| 2015 | Bourke | 48–24 | Walgett | | | |
| 2016 | Walgett | 40–24 | Cobar | | | |
| 2017 | Brewarrina | 42–18 | Walgett | | | |
| 2018 | Bourke | 62–34 | Walgett | | | |
| 2019 | Walgett | 38–18 | Bourke | | | |
| 2020 | No premiers due to COVID-19 pandemic. | | | | | |
| 2021 | No premiers due to COVID-19 pandemic. | | | | | |
| 2022 | Goodooga | 27–26 | Bourke | | Robert Hooper | Bourke |
| 2023 | Goodooga | 30–22 | Bourke | | | |
| 2024 | Brewarrina | 18–14 | Bourke | Walgett | | |

=== Reserve grade ===
| Year | Premiers | Score | Runners-up | Minor Premiers |
|---|---|---|---|---|
| 1949 | | | | |
| 1950 | | | | |
| 1951 | | | | |
| 1952 | | | | |
| 1953 | | | | |
| 1954 | | | | |
| 1955 | | | | |
| 1956 | | | | |
| 1957 | | | | |
| 1958 | | | | |
| 1959 | | | | |
| 1960 | Brewarrina | 24–11 | Cobar | |
| 1961 | | | | |
| 1962 | Cobar | | Warren | |
| 1963 | | | | |
| 1964 | | | | |
| 1965 | | | | |
| 1966 | | | | |
| 1967 | | | | |
| 1968 | | | | |
| 1969 | Warren | 13–3 | Bourke | Bourke |
| 1970 | Bourke | 33–5 | Brewarrina | |
| 1971 | | | | |
| 1972 | | | | |
| 1973 | | | | |
| 1974 | Bourke | 18–8 | Cobar | |
| 1975 | | | | |
| 1976 | | | | |
| 1977 | | | | |
| 1978 | | | | |
| 1979 | | | | |
| 1980 | | | | |
| 1981 | Nyngan | | Bourke | |
| 1982 | | | | |
| 1983 | Nyngan | 15–10 | Bourke | |
| 1984 | | | | |
| 1984 | | | | |
| 1985 | | | | |
| 1986 | | | | |
| 1987 | | | | |
| 1988 | | | | |
| 1989 | | | | |
| 1990 | | | | |
| 1991 | | | | |
| 1992 | | | | |

=== Under 18s ===
| Year | Premiers | Score | Runners-up | Minor Premiers |
|---|---|---|---|---|
| 1949 | | | | |
| 1950 | | | | |
| 1951 | | | | |
| 1952 | | | | |
| 1953 | | | | |
| 1954 | | | | |
| 1955 | | | | |
| 1956 | | | | |
| 1957 | | | | |
| 1958 | | | | |
| 1959 | | | | |
| 1960 | | | | |
| 1961 | | | | |
| 1962 | | | | |
| 1963 | | | | |
| 1964 | | | | |
| 1965 | | | | |
| 1966 | | | | |
| 1967 | | | | |
| 1968 | | | | |
| 1969 | Bourke | 7–5 | Cobar | |
| 1970 | | | | |
| 1971 | | | | |
| 1972 | | | | |
| 1973 | | | | |
| 1974 | Bourke | 10–3 | Cobar | |
| 1975 | | | | |
| 1976 | | | | |
| 1977 | | | | |
| 1978 | | | | |
| 1979 | | | | |
| 1980 | | | | |
| 1981 | Bourke | | | |
| 1982 | | | | |
| 1983 | | | | |
| 1984 | | | | |
| 1984 | | | | |
| 1985 | | | | |
| 1986 | | | | |
| 1987 | | | | |
| 1988 | | | | |
| 1989 | | | | |
| 1990 | | | | |
| 1991 | | | | |
| 1992 | | | | |

== Sources ==
| Years | Item | Via |
|---|---|---|
| 1967–69, 1971–96 | Country Rugby League Annual Report | State Library of NSW |
| 1982 to 2001 | Rugby League Week | Bound copies at State Library of NSW |
| 2002 to 2014 | Rugby League Week | eResources at State Library of NSW |
| 2012 to 2022 | Western Rams YouTube Channel | YouTube Videos |
| 2022 to 2023 | Battlers For Bush Footy | Website |
