= Come By Chance, New South Wales =

Come By Chance New South Wales
- Coordinates: 30°19′0″S 148°28′0″E
- Population: 125 (2016 census)
- Postcode(s): 2832
- Elevation: 145 m (476 ft)
- Location: 606 km (377 mi) NW of Sydney; 142 km (88 mi) W of Narrabri; 55 km (34 mi) SE of Walgett; 78 km (48 mi) N of Coonamble
- LGA(s): Walgett Shire
- State electorate(s): Barwon
- Federal division(s): Parkes

Come By Chance is a locality in the Pilliga district of northern New South Wales, Australia. It is located about 100 kilometres (60 mi) north of Coonabarabran. It is in the Walgett Shire. At the 2006 census, Come By Chance had a population of 187. By the time of the 2016 census this had fallen to 125.

== History ==
Come By Chance is located on the lands of the Ngiyampaa nation.

George and William Colless purchased a sheep station in the area in 1862, naming it "Come by Chance" to reflect their surprise at being able to make such a purchase in this area. The town was later named after this property. It has frequently been noted on lists of unusual place names.

== Events ==
Each year it attracts several thousand spectators to the Come-By-Chance Picnic Race Meeting.

== In popular culture ==
The town features in Banjo Paterson's wistful ballad Come-by-Chance:

But my languid mood forsook me, when I found a name that took me,
Quite by chance I came across it — `Come-by-Chance' was what I read;
No location was assigned it, not a thing to help one find it,
Just an N which stood for northward, and the rest was all unsaid.
