= Collarenebri =

- Town
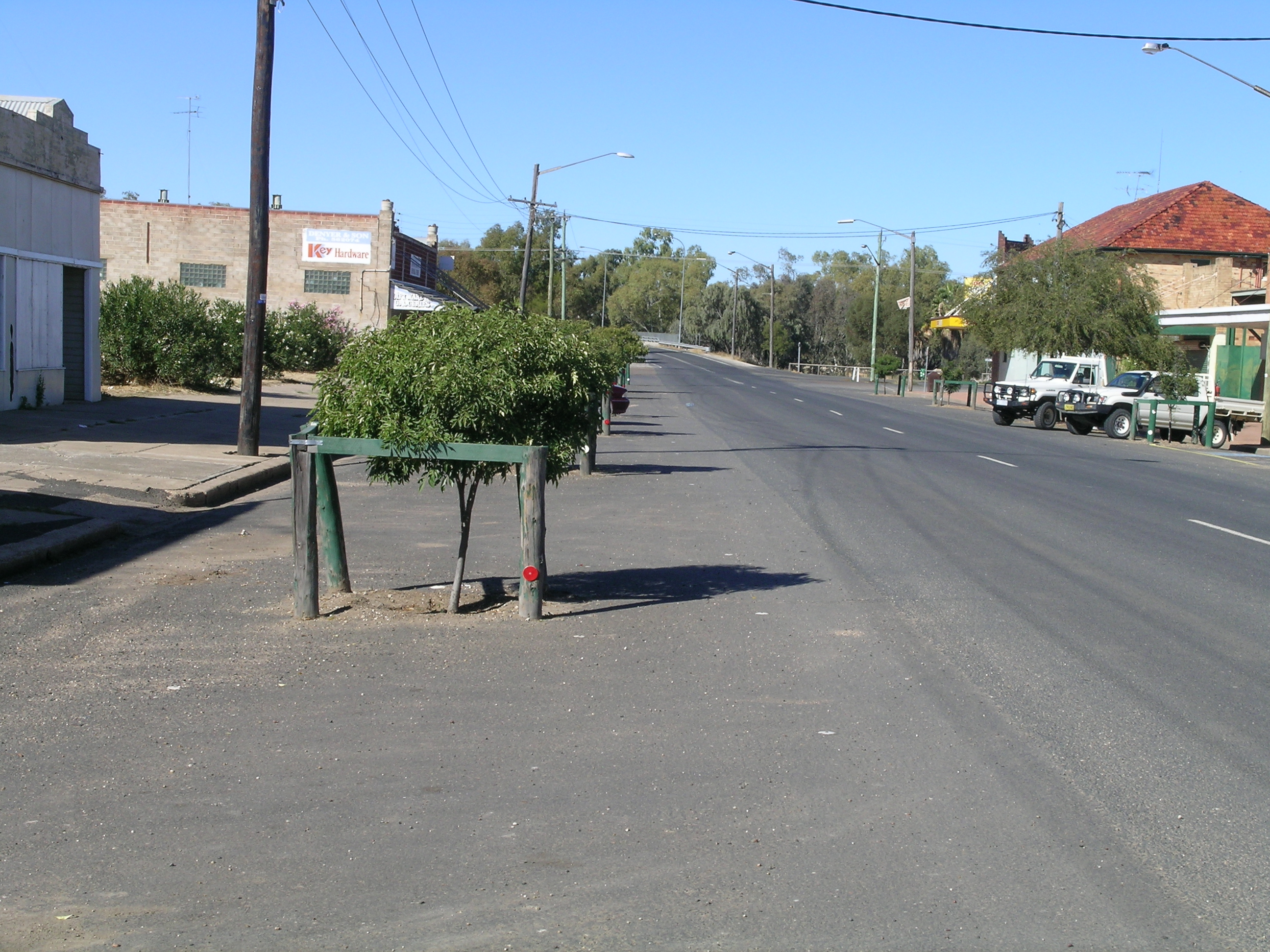
- Main street in 2008

- Coordinates: 29°33′0″S 148°35′0″E
- Country: Australia
- State: New South Wales
- LGA: Walgett Shire
- Location: 707 km (439 mi) NW of Sydney; 140 km (87 mi) W of Moree; 75 km (47 mi) NE of Walgett; 90 km (56 mi) SW of Mungindi

Government
  - State electorate: Barwon
  - Federal division: Parkes
- Elevation: 146 m (479 ft)

Population
  - Total: 650 (2016 census)
- Postcode: 2833

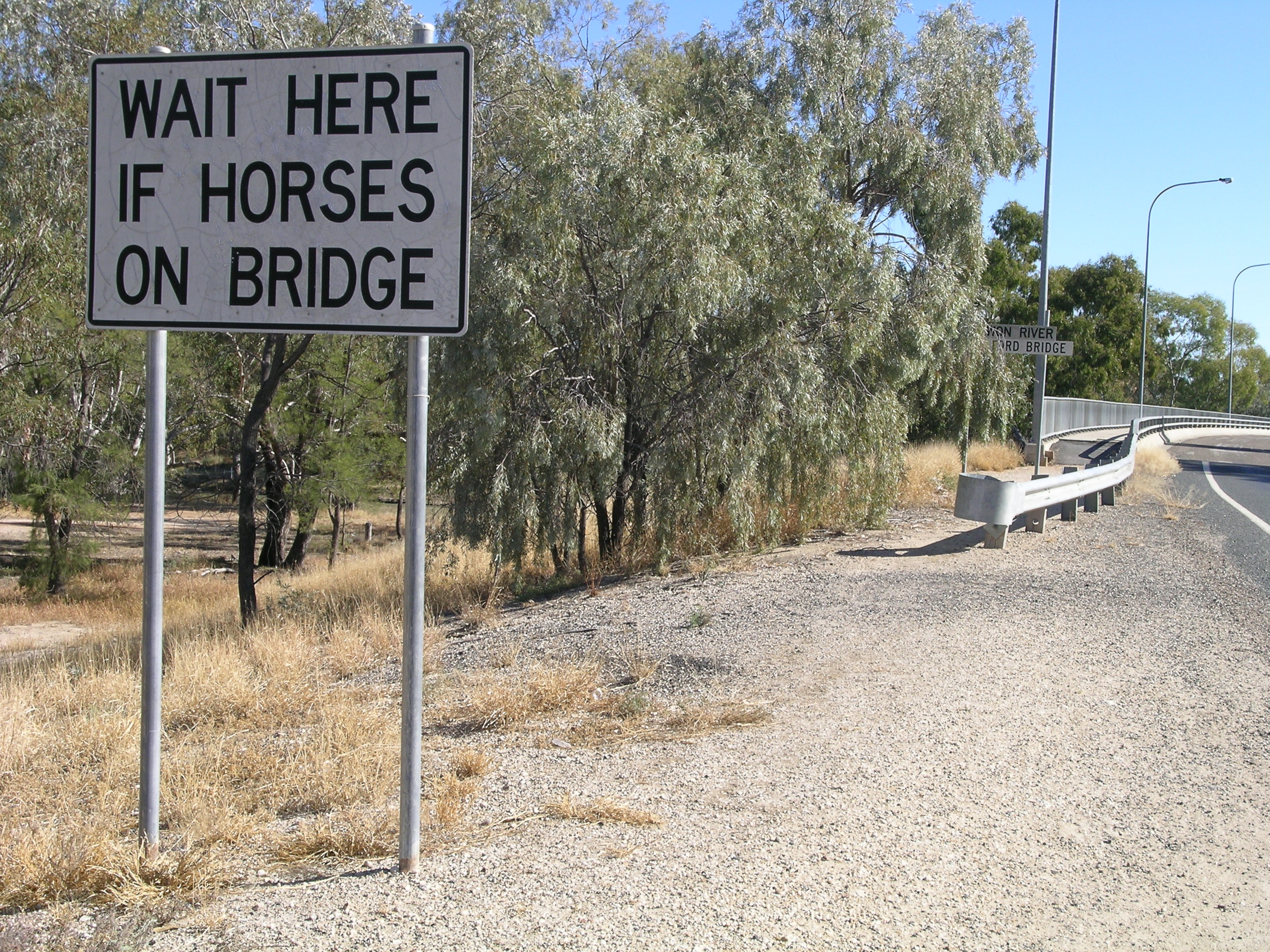
Sign on Rocky Ford Bridge over the Barwon River, Collarenebri, NSW

Collarenebri (/kɒlərɛnəbraɪ/ COLL-ə-REN-ə-bry) is a town in northern New South Wales, Australia. The town is in the Walgett Shire Local Government Area and is situated on the Barwon River approximately 75 kilometres (47 mi) northeast of Walgett and south west of Mungindi on the Gwydir Highway. It is 16 km (9.9 mi) from Pokataroo which was the nearest railway town prior to closure of the rail service there. The town is 146 metres (479 ft) above sea level. Industries in the area include cotton and wheat farming, sheep and beef cattle breeding.

In the 2021 census, Collarenebri had a population of 638.

Collarenebri is one of three towns ending in 'BRI' in Northern New South Wales, the others being Boggabri and Narrabri.

== Etymology ==
Collarenebri is an indigenous word of the Gamilaraay galariinbaraay, meaning 'place of flowers' or 'eucalyptus blossoms'. Historical spellings also include "Collarindabri".

== History ==
=== Indigenous history ===
The Gamilaroi Nation of Indigenous Australians resided in the vicinity of the modern town of Collarenebri prior to white settlement.

Yuwaalaraay (also known as Yuwalyai, Euahlayi, Yuwaaliyaay, Gamilaraay, Kamilaroi, Yuwaaliyaayi) is an Australian Aboriginal language spoken on Yuwaalaraay country. The Yuwaalaraay language region includes the landscape within the local government boundaries of the Shire of Balonne, including the town of Dirranbandi as well as the border town of Hebel extending to Walgett and Collarenebri in New South Wales.

Collarenebri has long been recorded as a significant site for Aboriginal people living in the area. There are many artifacts and significant sites along the Barwon River. On Collymongle Station there are some very old aboriginal carved trees. There is a well maintained Aboriginal cemetery just outside the town which is unique to the area, with graves covered in crushed and melted glass and decorated with items that represent that person. Collarenebri continues to be a significant community for Aboriginal people.

=== European Settlement ===
Collarenebri is located near a shallow rocky ford on the Barwon River, which provided a hard bottomed shallow river crossing for stock and pioneering travellers.

In 1860 William Earl settled near the Collarenebri crossing and established "The Squatters Arms" to capitalise on the increasing traffic through the area. Earl and his pub later became famous for having been held up by bushranger Captain Thunderbolt. Earl is credited with having established present day Collarenebri, with a prominent street and aged housing carrying his name. A number of his descendants still reside in the town.

By the end of 1865, Collarenebri is described as having "two stores, a public house, with another nearly finished: the timber is also lying at Collarenebri for a Government punt; several small houses and a population of about 50 people stationary."

The town of Collarenebri was later gazetted on 12 July 1867. By 1890 Collarenebri had become a growing town with a hospital, police station, school and a number of businesses. The cemetery at Collarenebri dates back to 1906.

=== 20th century ===
Severe flooding of the Barwon River in 1976 saw much of the town inundated. Around half of the local population were evacuated by the Royal Australian Air Force and NSW Police rescue squad after the town's sanitation and waste management infrastructure failed, along with heavy livestock deaths, amid concerns about disease.

Collarenebri was among the last places in Australia to be converted from a manual switchboard to an automatic telephone exchange (in 1986).

== Attractions ==
Collarenebri is well known for its flowers. The Barwon River area is regarded as one of the best inland fishing locations in Australia. Other activities include fossicking for gemstones such as topaz, agate and petrified wood.

== Sport ==
Collarenebri has a rugby league team, the Collarenebri Bulldogs, who compete in the Barwon Darling Rugby League competition.

== Media ==
Volunteers run Collarenebri's live, local radio station YAAMA-FM 95.9 specialising in indigenous programming.

== Heritage listings ==
Many of the buildings in Collarenebri today date back to c. 1910. Collarenebri has a number of heritage-listed sites, including:

- Gundabloui Road: Collarenebri Aboriginal Cemetery

== Population ==
Historical population
Year	Pop.	±%
1966	581	—
1971	608	+4.6%
1976	599	−1.5%
1981	602	+0.5%
1986	623	+3.5%
1991	617	−1.0%
1996	544	−11.8%
2001	495	−9.0%
2006	478	−3.4%
2011	386	−19.2%
2016	435	+12.7%
2021	425	−2.3%
Source: Australian Bureau of Statistics data.

In the 2016 Census, there were 650 people in Collarenebri.

- Aboriginal and Torres Strait Islander people made up 42.1% of the population.
- 90.4% of people were born in Australia and 89.9% of people spoke only English at home.
- The most common responses for religion were Anglican 31.1%, No Religion 26.3% and Catholic 17.3%.
