= Lightning Ridge, New South Wales =

Lightning Ridge
- Town
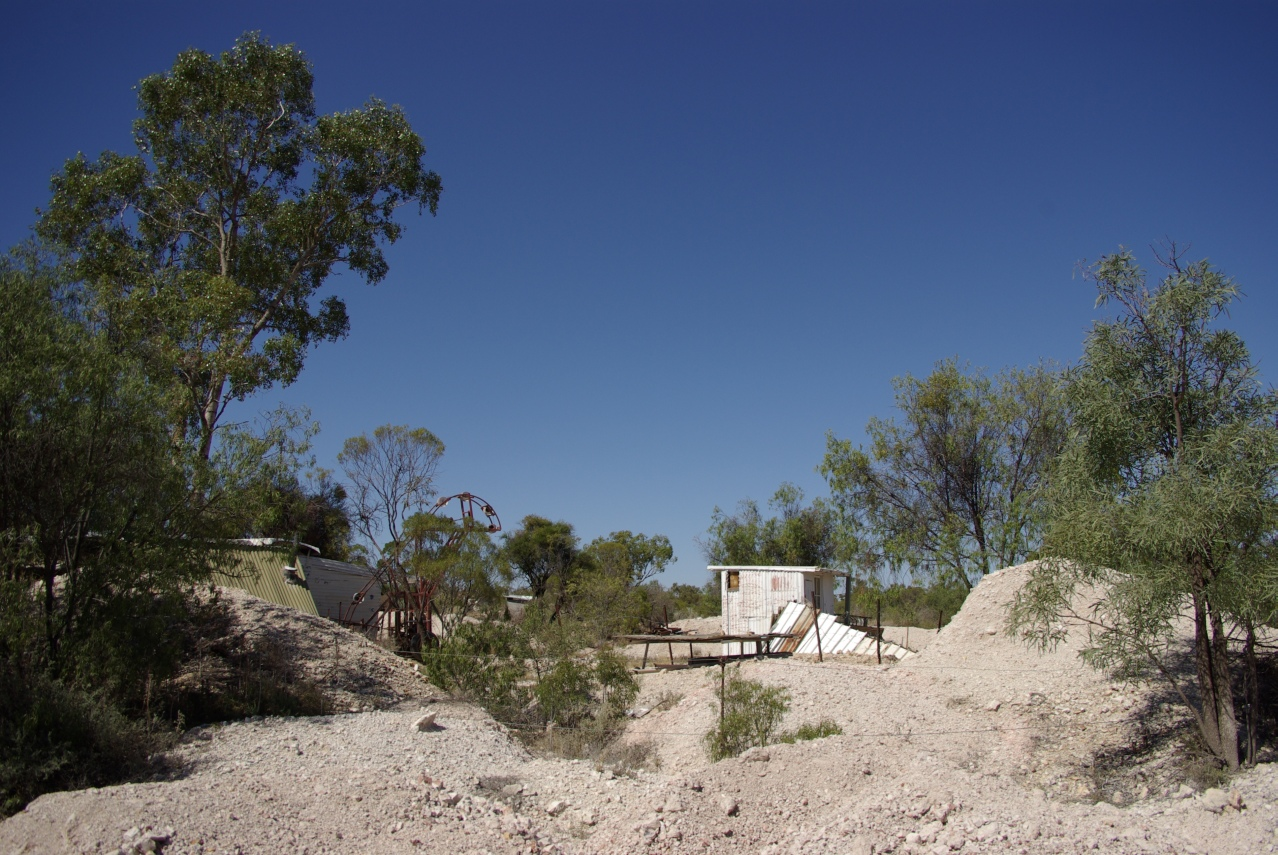
- Fossicking field in Lightning Ridge

- Coordinates: 29°26′0″S 147°58′0″E
- Country: Australia
- State: New South Wales
- LGA: Walgett Shire
- Location: 74 km (46 mi) N of Walgett; 720 km (450 mi) NW of Sydney
- Established: 1922

Government
  - State electorate: Barwon
  - Federal division: Parkes
- Elevation: 170 m (560 ft)

Population
  - Total: 1,946 (2021 census)
- Postcode: 2834
- County: Finch
- Mean max temp: 28 °C (82 °F)
- Mean min temp: 13.9 °C (57.0 °F)
- Annual rainfall: 470.7 mm (18.53 in)

Lightning Ridge is a small outback town in northern New South Wales, Australia. Part of Walgett Shire, Lightning Ridge is situated near the southern border of Queensland, about 6 km (4 mi) east of the Castlereagh Highway. The Lightning Ridge area is a centre of the mining of black opal and other opal gemstones.

== Indigenous inhabitants ==
The traditional owners of the land around Lightning Ridge are the Yuwaalaraay people. Yuwaalayaay (also known as Yuwalyai, Euahlayi, Yuwaaliyaay, Gamilaraay, Kamilaroi, Yuwaaliyaayi) is an Australian Aboriginal language spoken on Yuwaalayaay country. It is closely related to the Gamilaraay and Yuwaalaraay languages. The Yuwaalayaay language region includes the landscape within the local government boundaries of the Shire of Balonne, including the town of Dirranbandi as well as the border town of Goodooga extending to Walgett and the Narran Lakes in New South Wales.

After they were displaced by the establishment of colonial pastoral stations, many Yuwaalaraay people stayed on as labourers, but were increasingly dispersed in the early 20th century. In 1936, several indigenous families living at a local government settlement were forced to move to the Brewarrina settlement.

== European settlement ==
By the mid-1800s, British colonialists settled in the area, initially using the land for pastoral activities.

The name Lightning Ridge is said to have originated when in the 1870s, some passers-by found the bodies of a farmer, his dog, and 200 sheep, which had been struck by lightning.

Europeans did not discover the potential for opal mining in Lightning Ridge until the late 1800s. In 1905, the first shafts were dug, with the unique Black Opal soon attracting attention of fossickers in established mining towns such as White Cliffs. Charlie Nettleton, an early pioneer in the area, walked 700 km (430 mi) from White Cliffs to see the Black Opal, walking back to White Cliffs the following year with Jack Murray to develop a market and selling black opals to Ted Murphy, who later became the first resident opal buyer in Lightning Ridge. Nettleton, now regarded as the founder of the black opal industry, is commemorated with a life-sized bronze statue, the "Spirit of Lightning Ridge"; it is located in the town at 7 Morilla Street.

== Population ==
At the 2021 census, Lightning Ridge had a population of 1,946, with a median age of 53.

- Aboriginal and Torres Strait Islander people made up 20.3% of the population.
- 64.2% of people were born in Australia, with other top countries of birth being England 1.5%, the Philippines 1.4% and New Zealand 1.3%.
- 69.9% of people only spoke English at home. The most common responses for languages other than English included Serbian 1.7%, German 1.1%, and Tagalog 0.8%.
- The most common responses for religion were no religion 36.1%, Catholic 15.1% and Anglican 13.8%. Christianity was the largest religious group reported overall (49.9%).

At the 2001 census, the town had a population of 1,826, of whom 344 (18.8%) were Indigenous Australians. The population is said to be highly variable, as transient miners come and go over time. Prior to the 2004 public inquiry into the functioning of Walgett Shire, it worked on the basis that about 7,000 people were in the town, but the enquiry found that this estimate was not supported by the 2001 census and contrasted with the 1,109 people who voted in the town at the local government elections in 2004. At the 2006 census, the population of Lightning Ridge had increased to 2,602 people.

By the 2016 census the population had fallen slightly to 2,284, with a median age of 51.

- Aboriginal and Torres Strait Islander people made up 22.7% of the population.
- About 69.2% of people were born in Australia, with other top countries of birth being England 1.9%, Germany 1.5%, and the Philippines 1.4%.
- Around 79.1% of people only spoke English at home. The most common responses for languages other than English included Serbian 2.4%, German 1.2%, and Croatian 0.9%.
- The most common responses for religion were no religion 29.3%, Anglican 22.1%, and Catholic 18.7%. Christianity was the largest religious group reported overall (62.9%).

The town was listed as one of the poorest places in the state according to the 2015 Dropping Off The Edge report.

== Climate ==
Lightning Ridge has a hot semiarid climate (BSh) under the Köppen climate classification.

Climate data for Lightning Ridge
Month	Jan	Feb	Mar	Apr	May	Jun	Jul	Aug	Sep	Oct	Nov	Dec	Year
Record high °C (°F)	48.5 (119.3)	47.2 (117.0)	42.0 (107.6)	36.1 (97.0)	32.0 (89.6)	27.2 (81.0)	28.8 (83.8)	36.2 (97.2)	39.3 (102.7)	41.5 (106.7)	44.5 (112.1)	43.6 (110.5)	48.5 (119.3)
Mean daily maximum °C (°F)	36.1 (97.0)	34.9 (94.8)	32.4 (90.3)	28.1 (82.6)	23.2 (73.8)	19.4 (66.9)	19.3 (66.7)	21.6 (70.9)	26.2 (79.2)	29.4 (84.9)	31.9 (89.4)	34.6 (94.3)	28.1 (82.6)
Mean daily minimum °C (°F)	22.5 (72.5)	21.7 (71.1)	19.0 (66.2)	14.4 (57.9)	9.1 (48.4)	6.6 (43.9)	4.9 (40.8)	6.1 (43.0)	10.4 (50.7)	14.2 (57.6)	18.2 (64.8)	20.2 (68.4)	13.9 (57.0)
Record low °C (°F)	11.5 (52.7)	10.3 (50.5)	5.0 (41.0)	2.0 (35.6)	0.0 (32.0)	−3.5 (25.7)	−4.4 (24.1)	−2.2 (28.0)	1.5 (34.7)	4.9 (40.8)	6.0 (42.8)	5.0 (41.0)	−4.4 (24.1)
Average precipitation mm (inches)	50.6 (1.99)	40.0 (1.57)	40.7 (1.60)	27.6 (1.09)	25.0 (0.98)	47.3 (1.86)	30.2 (1.19)	18.2 (0.72)	30.6 (1.20)	40.3 (1.59)	55.5 (2.19)	59.5 (2.34)	478.2 (18.83)
Average precipitation days	5.8	4.5	5.3	3.4	4.0	5.5	4.9	4.0	4.3	5.5	7.1	7.2	61.5
Average afternoon relative humidity (%)	35	38	38	41	44	54	48	38	33	34	39	33	40

== Activities ==
The Lightning Ridge Opal and Gem Festival takes place yearly. The town has a five-star Olympic pool, which features a diving complex, a rock climbing wall, and water theme park that operates during the summer holidays. Parts of the pool are protected by shade, and the complex has barbecue facilities. The Ella Nagy Youth Centre opened in 2000; it features a skatepark. Until 2011, Lightning Ridge hosted an annual goat race in the town's main street and a rodeo on the Easter long weekend. Goats were harnessed and driven by children, much like harness racing in equine sports. The goat races were accompanied by wheelie-bin races, and horse racing the following day.

Local football team the Lightning Ridge Redbacks play in the Group 15 Barwon Darling Rugby League competition.

Lightning Ridge is home to the St George Serbian Orthodox Church with a travelling priest from Brisbane attending several times a year to conduct mass.

== Arts ==
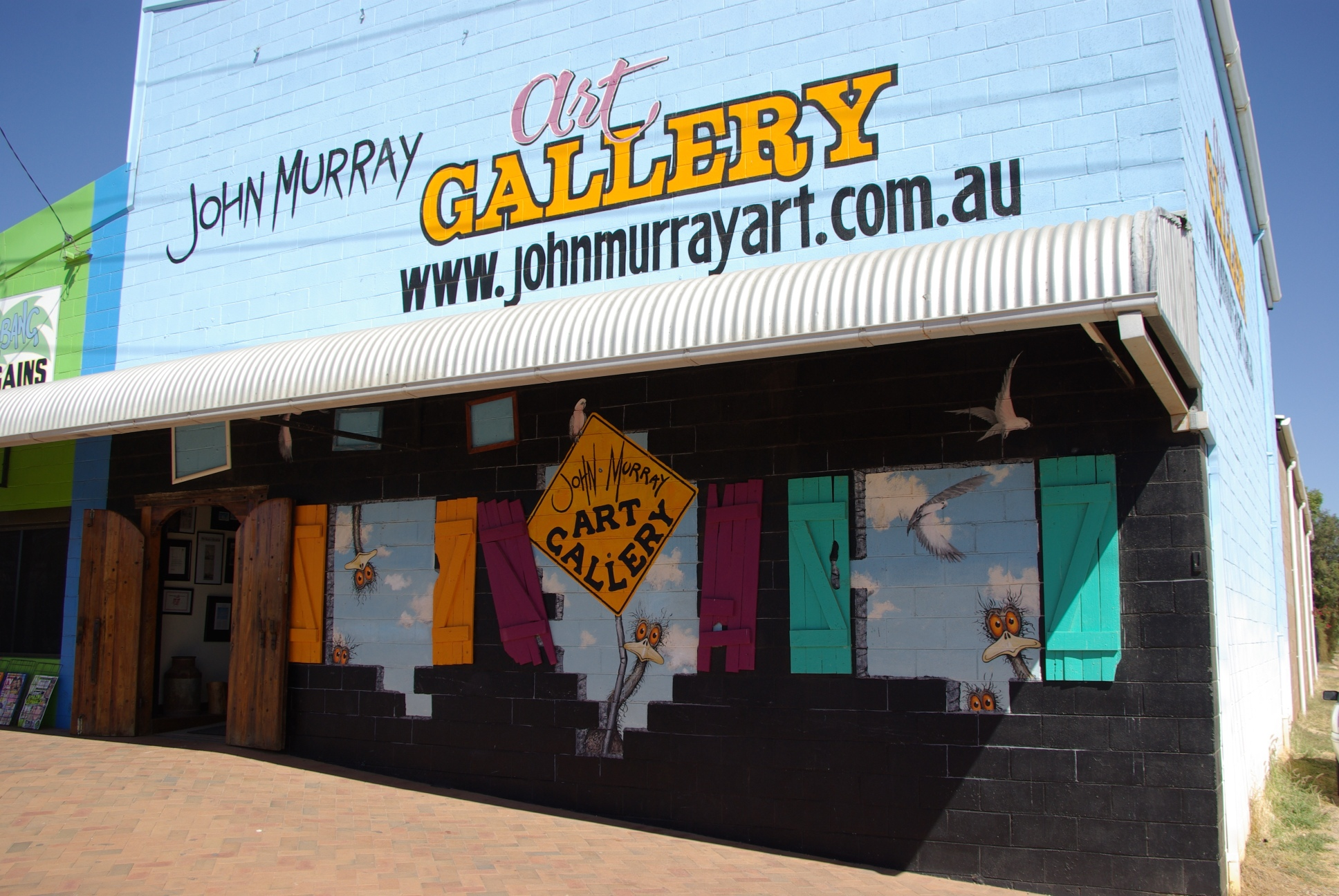
The old John Murray art gallery (destroyed by fire, 2017)

Some artists have settled in and around Lightning Ridge. One of the most famous local Australian painters is John Murray, who brings the impressions of the Outback, often in a situation with man or fauna onto the canvas.

== Fossils ==
Lightning Ridge is an important paleontological site, with opalised fossils dating back to the Cretaceous period, around 100 million years ago, deriving from the Griman Creek Formation. The site is especially important as a source of fossils of ancient mammals, which, at that time, were small creatures living in a world dominated by dinosaurs. The fossils are sometimes opalised and discovered by opal miners. Important discoveries at Lightning Ridge include the ancestral monotremes Kollikodon ritchiei and Steropodon galmani. In June 2019, a new species of dinosaur, Fostoria dhimbangunmal, was described from fossils retrieved from Lightning Ridge. The plant-eating species lived at least 100 million years ago. It is the most complete dinosaur fossil to be found preserved as opal.

== Fossicking ==
Since August 1992 when the Mining Act 1992 commenced, fossicking licences have not been required for fossicking in New South Wales.

Under the terms of this act, fossicking may now be carried out anywhere in the state providing these conditions are met:

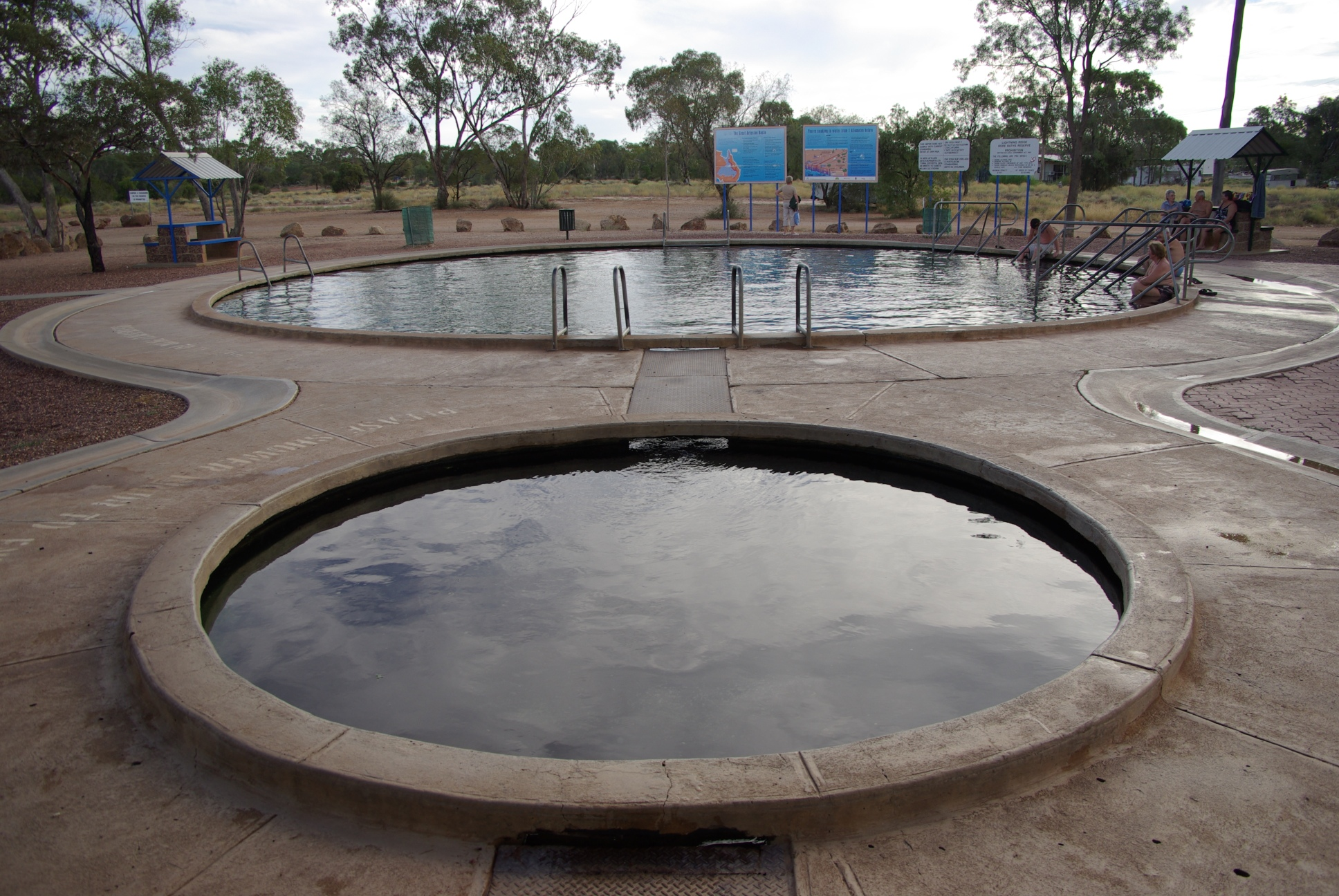
Bathing thermes in artesian bore water

- No other act or law applies which would prevent it
- The landholder's consent is obtained
- The consent of any public or local authority having the management, control, or trusteeship of the land is obtained
- The titleholder's consent is also obtained, where the location is covered by a current title under the Mining Act 1992 (This title may be an exploration licence, assessment lease, mining lease, mineral claim or Opal Prospecting Licence).

== Water ==
Lightning Ridge has an abundance of hot water from a bore spring into the Great Artesian Basin and offers two hot-water pools for bathing. The public can tap mineral water at a hose in Harlequin Street. The Hot Artesian Bore Baths and Nettletons Shaft, on McDonald's Six Mile Opal Field, have been placed on the Register of the National Estate.

== Media ==
The town is serviced by three radio stations. Opal FM on 89.7 MHz, Outback Radio 2WEB on 90.5 MHz and 2CUZ FM on 96.1 MHz.

The Western Herald is published on a weekly basis (every Thursday) year-round, except during a short break at Christmas and covers local Lightning Ridge Stories.

== Notable residents ==
Australian comedian, actor and television presenter Paul Hogan claimed to be from Lightning Ridge to improve his chances to appear on Australian television talent contest New Faces, but was actually born in the suburbs of Sydney. As the myth helped drive tourism to Lightning Ridge, Hogan has avoided correcting the record.

Tyrone Lindqvist of Rüfüs Du Sol grew up in Lightning Ridge.

A legitimate native of Lightning Ridge is current Australia women's rugby union international Bella McKenzie.

== Gallery ==
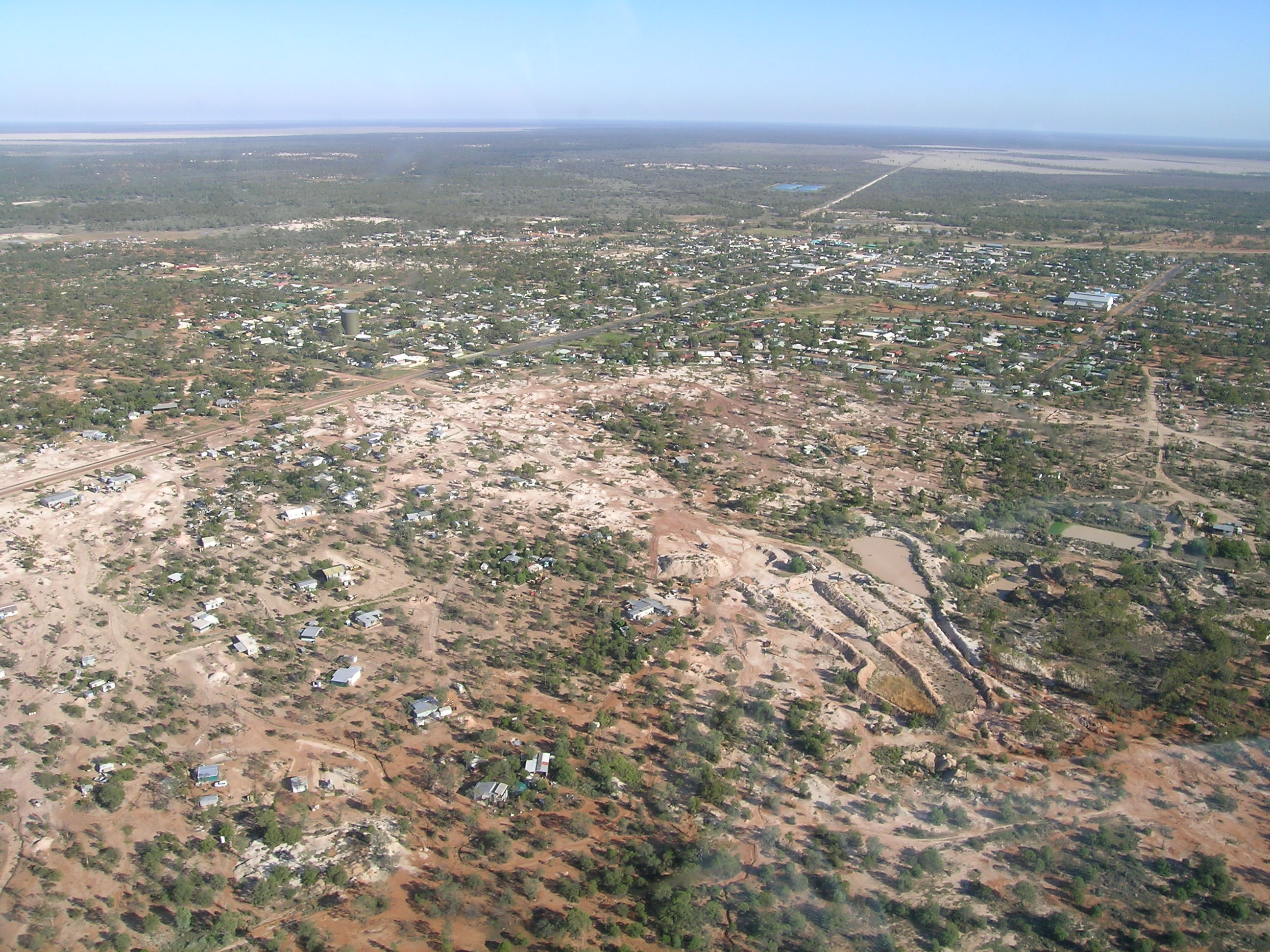
Aerial photo of Lightning Ridge town and nearby mines

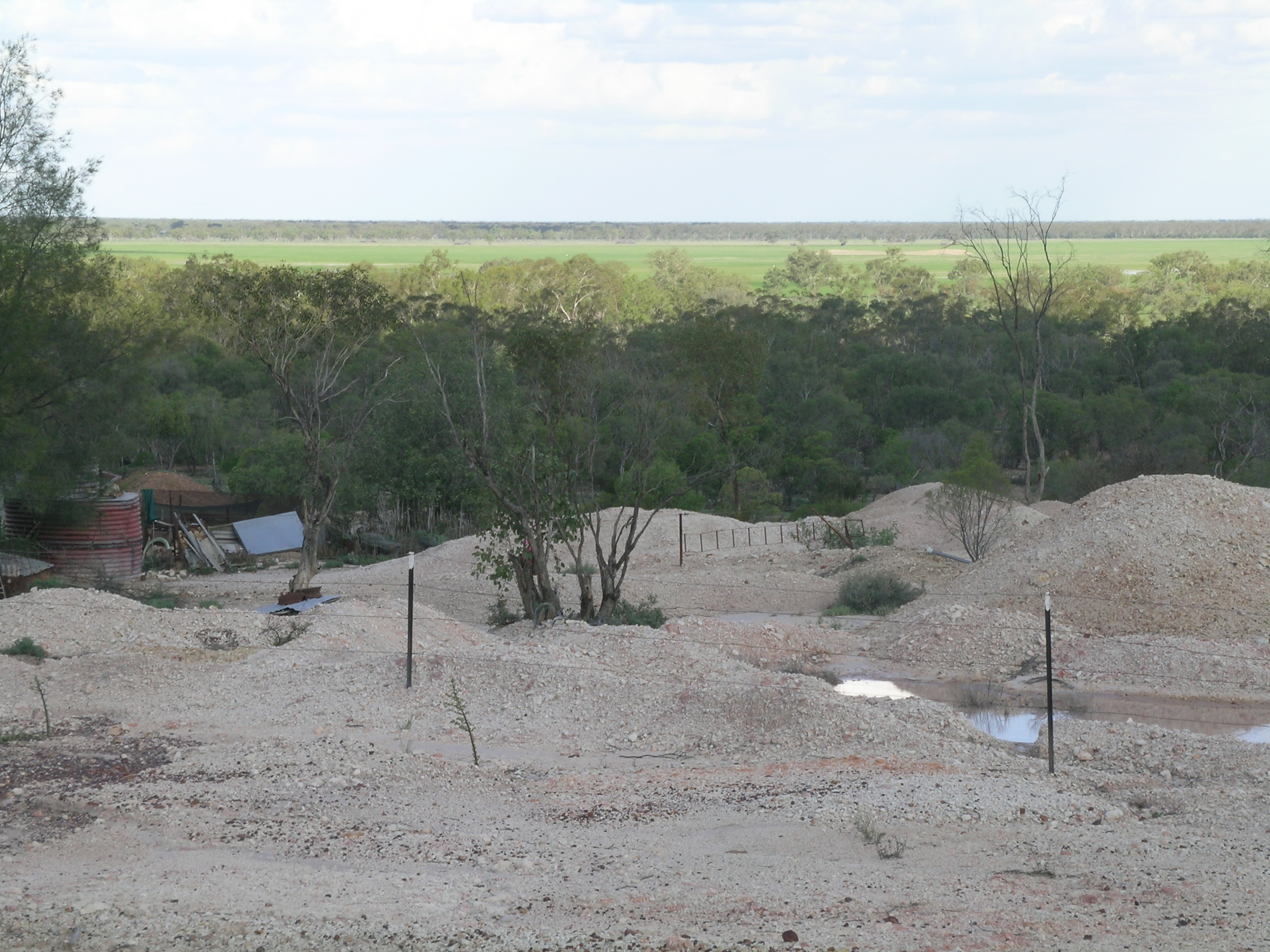
Opal mines and the plain that surrounds Lightning Ridge, NSW

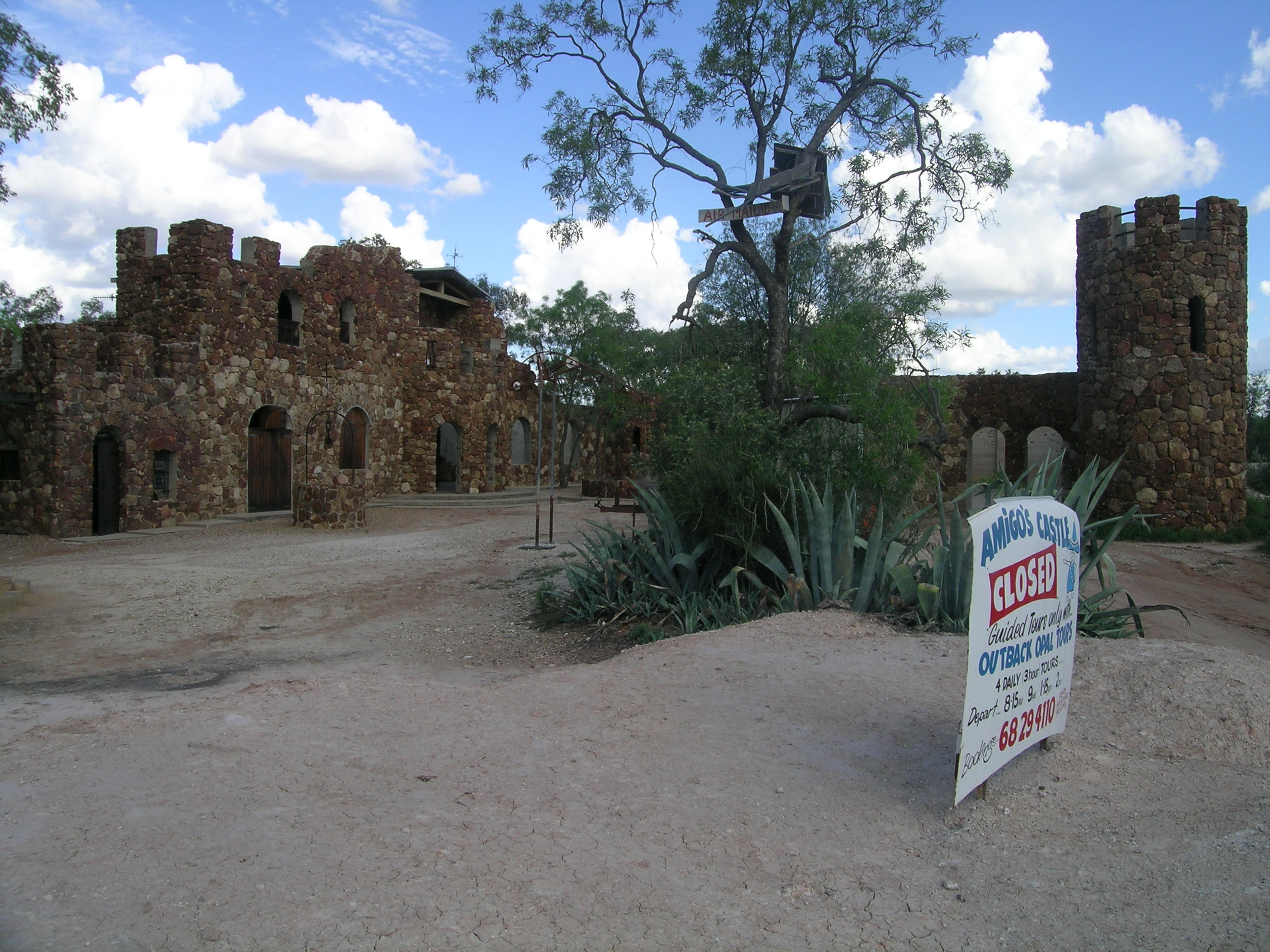
Amigo's Castle, Lightning Ridge, NSW

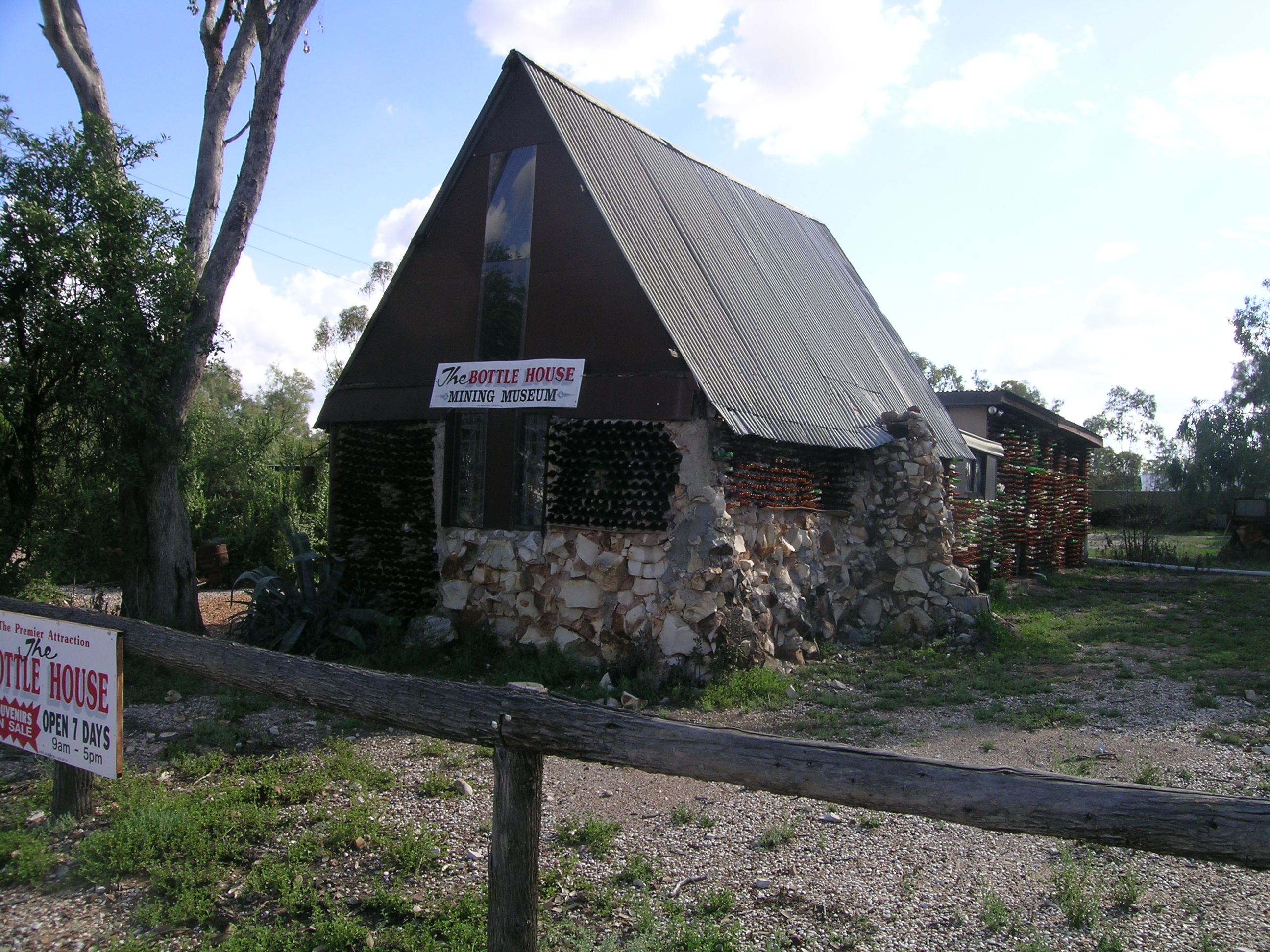
The bottle house mining museum, Lightning Ridge, NSW, built by German-born Australian artist Tex (H.A.W.A) Moeckel, b.1934 d.1996: Moeckel built the bottle house for his wife, Nola.

== See also ==
- Lightning Ridge Airport
- List of fossil sites (with link directory)
