= Walgett Shire =

- Local government area
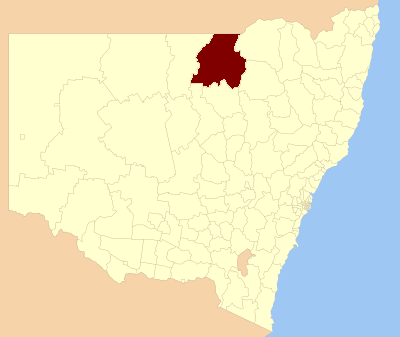
- Location in New South Wales

- Interactive map of Walgett Shire
- Coordinates: 30°01′S 148°07′E
- Country: Australia
- State: New South Wales
- Region: Orana
- Established: 7 March 1906
- Council seat: Walgett

Government
  - Mayor: Jasen Ramien (Unaligned)
  - State electorate: Barwon
  - Federal division: Parkes

Area
  - Total: 22,336 km^{2} (8,624 sq mi)

Population
  - Totals: 6,107 (2016 census); 6,051 (2018 est.)
  - Density: 0.273415/km^{2} (0.70814/sq mi)
- Website: Walgett Shire
LGAs around Walgett Shire
Balonne (Qld)	Balonne (Qld)	Balonne (Qld)
Brewarrina	Walgett Shire	Moree Plains
Warren	Coonamble	Narrabri

Walgett Shire is a local government area in the Orana region of New South Wales, Australia. The northern boundary of the Shire is located adjacent to the border between New South Wales and Queensland. The town of Walgett is located on the Namoi River, nearby to its junction with the Barwon River and at the junction of the Kamilaroi Highway and the Castlereagh Highway.

The Shire is divided between the agricultural areas (producing wool, cattle, wheat and cotton), which are near the Barwon and Namoi rivers or south-east of the Barwon River, and the outback country north-west of the Barwon River, including the black opal mining and fossicking town of Lightning Ridge. Prior to 1957, when Lightning Ridge was established as a significant settlement, the outback country was part of the Western Division.

The mayor of Walgett Shire Council is Jasen Ramien who is unaligned with any political party.

== Towns and villages ==
Walgett Shire includes Walgett, Lightning Ridge, Collarenebri, Pokataroo, Rowena, Burren Junction, Cryon, Cumborah, Glengarry and Carinda. Come By Chance was established in 1840, before all of the above towns and villages.

== Heritage listings ==
Walgett Shire has a number of heritage-listed sites, including:

- Collarenebri, Gundabloui Road: Collarenebri Aboriginal Cemetery

== Demographics ==
According to the Australian Bureau of Statistics during 2003–04 there:

- were 1,726 wage and salary earners (ranked 123rd in New South Wales and 393rd in Australia, less than 0.1% of both New South Wales's 2,558,415 and Australia's 7,831,856)
- was a total income of $55 million (ranked 121st in New South Wales and 391st in Australia, less than 0.1% of both New South Wales's $107 billion and Australia's $304 billion)
- was an estimated average income per wage and salary earner of $31,980 (ranked 112th in New South Wales and 376th in Australia, 77% of New South Wales's $41,407 and 82% of Australia's $38,820)
- was an estimated median income per wage and salary earner of $29,155 (ranked 119th in New South Wales and 406th in Australia, 82% of New South Wales's $35,479 and 85% of Australia's $34,149).

Selected historical census data for Walgett Shire local government area
Census year		2011	2016
Population	Estimated residents on census night	6,454	▼6,107
Population	LGA rank in terms of size within New South Wales	106th	▼107th
Population	% of New South Wales population		
Population	% of Australian population		
Cultural and language diversity			
Ancestry, top responses	English		
Ancestry, top responses	Australian		
Ancestry, top responses	Italian		
Ancestry, top responses	Chinese		
Ancestry, top responses	Irish		
Language, top responses (other than English)	Italian		
Language, top responses (other than English)	Mandarin		
Language, top responses (other than English)	Cantonese		
Language, top responses (other than English)	Korean		
Language, top responses (other than English)	Greek		
Religious affiliation			
Religious affiliation, top responses	Catholic		
Religious affiliation, top responses	No religion		
Religious affiliation, top responses	Anglican		
Religious affiliation, top responses	Eastern Orthodox		
Religious affiliation, top responses	Buddhism		
Median weekly incomes			
Personal income	Median weekly personal income	A$	
Personal income	% of Australian median income		
Family income	Median weekly family income		
Family income	% of Australian median income		
Household income	Median weekly household income		
Household income	% of Australian median income		

== Council ==
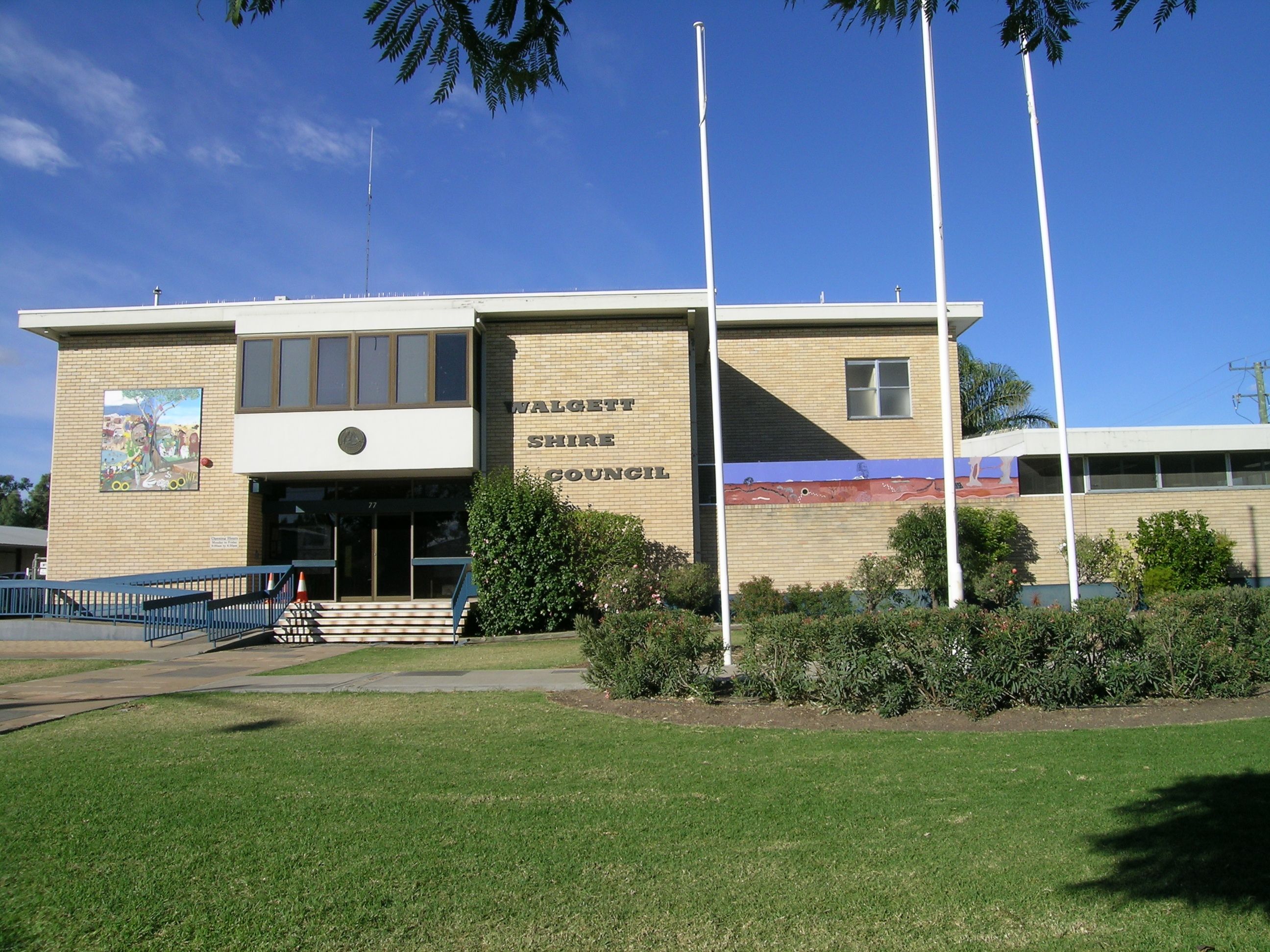
Walgett Shire Council

Between 2004 and 2008, the council was controlled by an Administrator, Vic Smith, appointed by the New South Wales Minister for Local Government. The previous Walgett Shire Council was split between factions representing Lightning Ridge and the rest of the Shire and apparently became unworkable as a result. In 2004, a public inquiry investigated the dispute, among other things, under the Local Government Act, 1993 (NSW). Other matters investigated included poor administration, failure to properly inform councillors in relation to some matters, apparently illegal walkouts by some Councilors to frustrate votes and, in particular, events surrounding a failed project to build a community centre in Lightning Ridge.

=== Current composition and election method ===
Walgett Shire Council is composed of nine councillors elected proportionally as a single ward. All councillors are elected for a fixed four-year term of office. The mayor is elected by the councillors at the first meeting of the council. The most recent election was held on 22 December 2021, and the makeup of the council is as follows:

Party	Councillors
Unaligned	9
Total	9

The current Council, elected in 2024, in order of election, is:

Councillor	Party	Notes
Alfred Seaton	Unaligned	
Jasen Ramien	Unaligned	Mayor
Pauline Kearl	Unaligned	
Jane Keir	Unaligned	
Gregory Rummery	Unaligned	Deputy Mayor
Scott Bailey	Unaligned	
Jo Coleman	Unaligned	
Michael Cooke	Unaligned	
Daniel Walford	Unaligned	

== Election results ==
=== 2024 ===
2024 New South Wales local elections: Walgett
Party	Candidate	Votes	%	±%
Independent	Alfred Seaton (elected)	430	17.8	+7.9
Independent	Jasen Ramien (elected)	348	14.4	+5.3
Independent	Pauline Kearl (elected)	287	11.9	
Independent	Jane Keir (elected)	261	10.8	+5.3
Independent	Gregory Rummery (elected)	241	10.0	+1.6
Independent	Scott Bailey (elected)	191	7.9	
Independent	Jo Coleman (elected)	172	7.1	+2.5
Independent	Michael Cooke (elected)	163	6.8	−0.4
Independent	Doreen Peters	116	4.8	
Independent	Daniel Walford (elected)	81	3.4	−1.8
Independent	Mary Purse	67	2.8	
Independent	Kaylene (Katie) Hook	31	1.3	
Independent	Debra Rose	23	1.0	
Total formal votes		2,411	94.1	
Informal votes		151	5.9	
Turnout		2,562	67.5	
