= Walgett, New South Wales =

Walgett
- Town
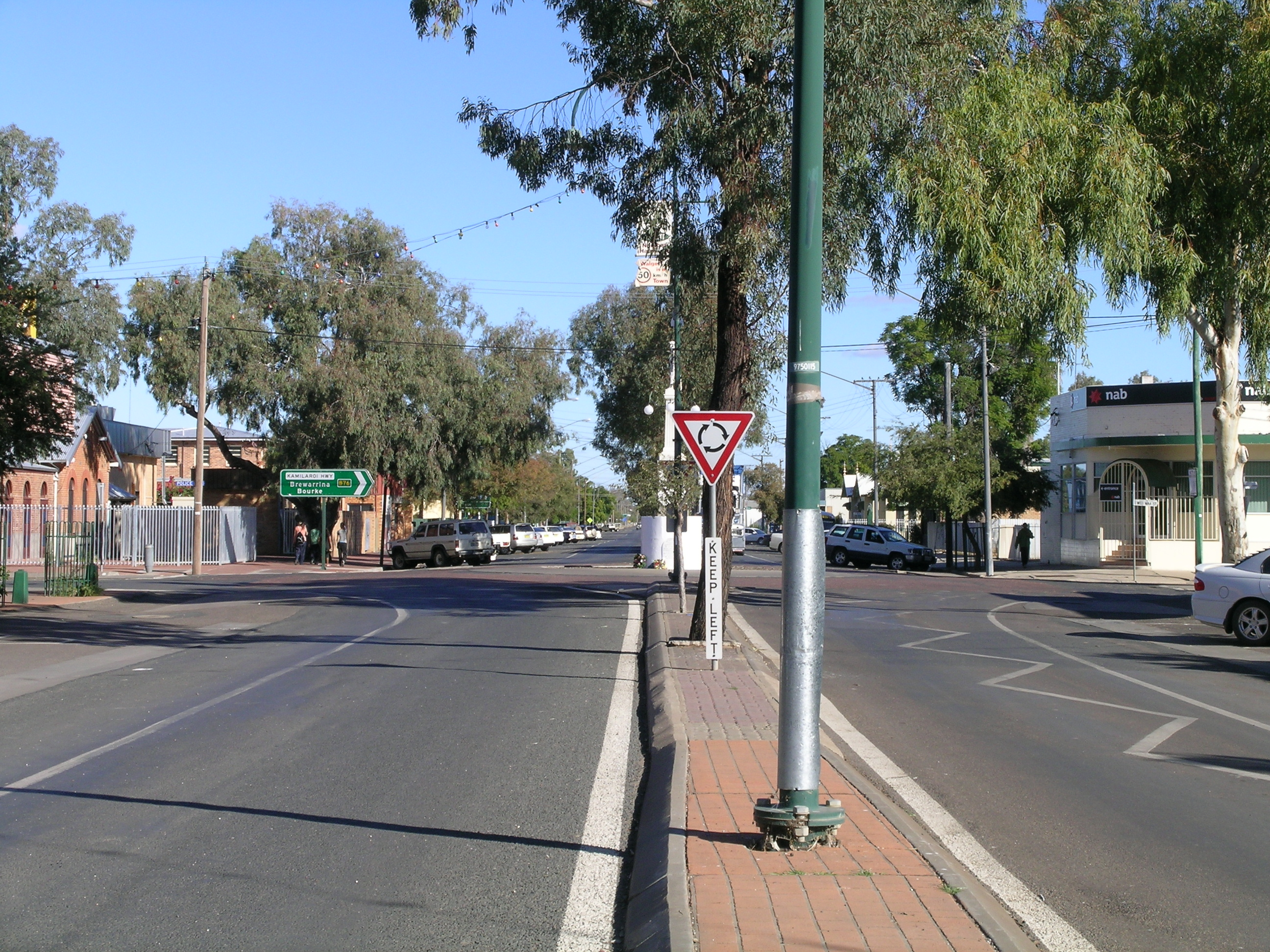
- Main street, Walgett (Fox Street/Castlereagh Highway) looking south over Wee Waa Street

- Coordinates: 30°01′0″S 148°07′0″E
- Country: Australia
- State: New South Wales
- LGA: Walgett Shire
- Location: 691 km (429 mi) NW of Sydney; 279 km (173 mi) N of Dubbo; 186 km (116 mi) W of Narrabri; 117 km (73 mi) N of Coonamble; 136 km (85 mi) E of Brewarrina

Government
  - State electorate: Barwon
  - Federal division: Parkes
- Elevation: 133 m (436 ft)

Population
  - Total: 1,377 (2021 census)
- Postcode: 2832
- County: Baradine
- Mean max temp: 26.9 °C (80.4 °F)
- Mean min temp: 12.5 °C (54.5 °F)
- Annual rainfall: 480.6 mm (18.92 in)

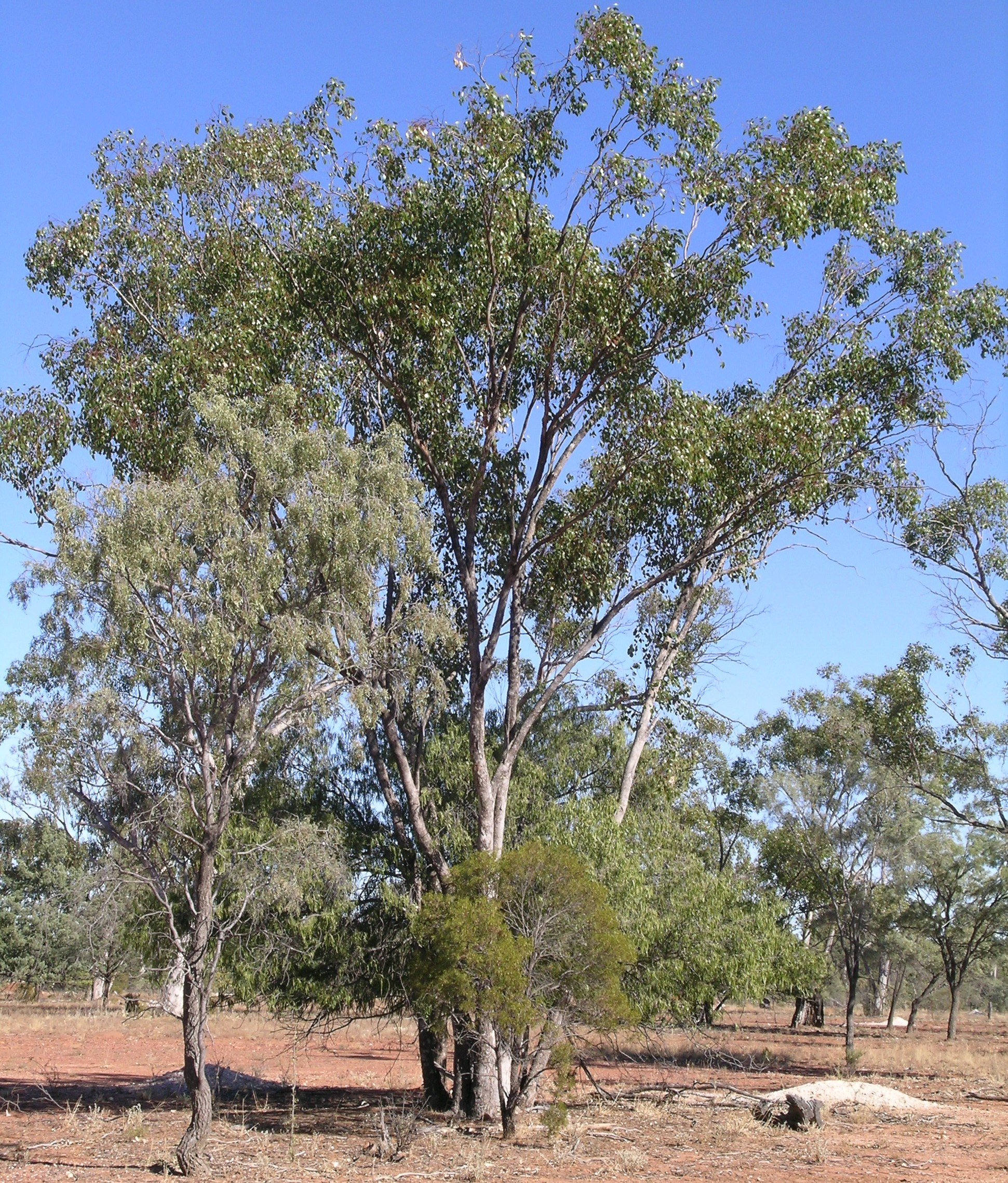
Trees that are common in the Walgett district: Eucalyptus (bimble box), Geijera (wilga), sandalwood and Acacia (ironwood)

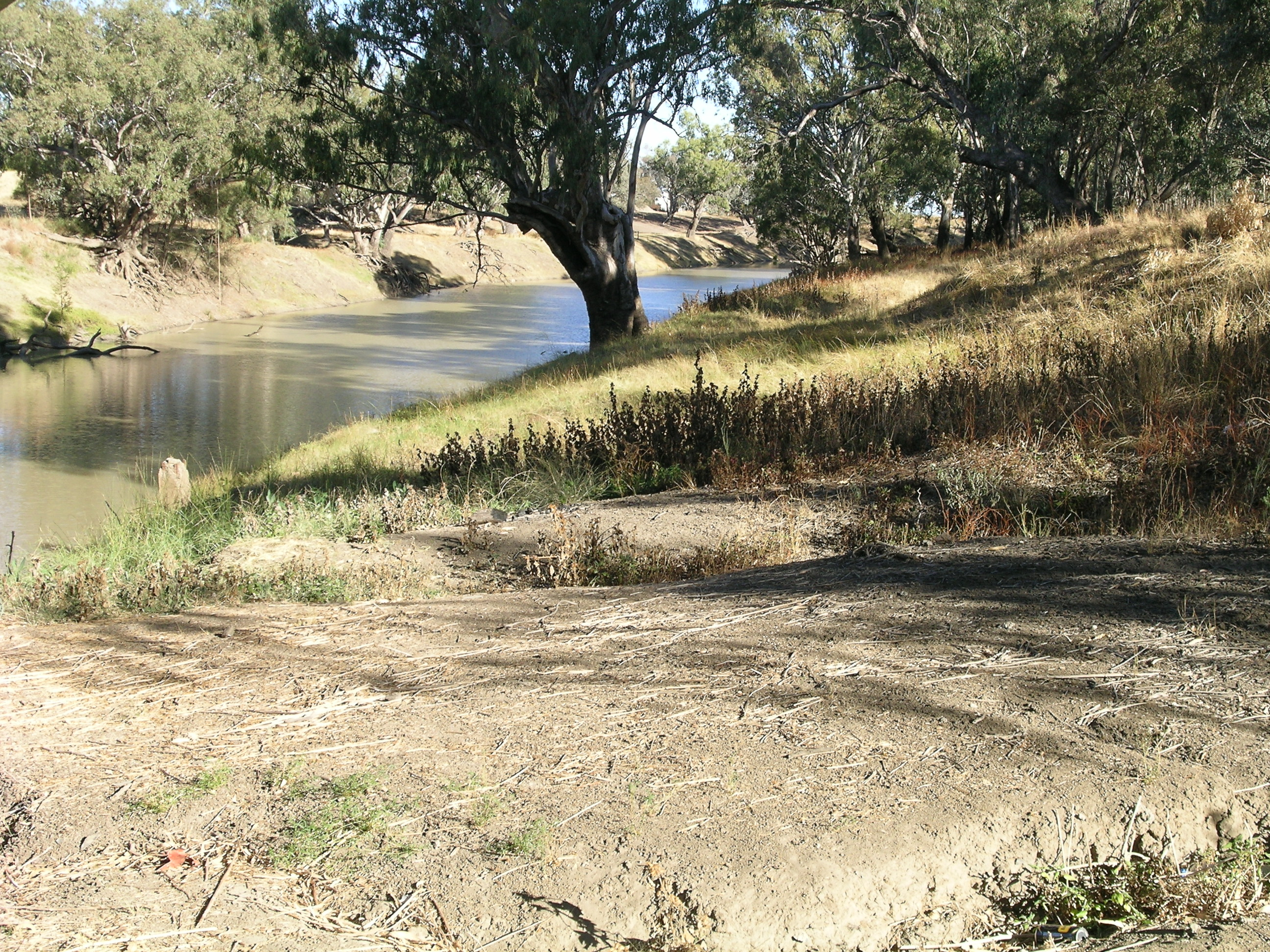
Barwon River near Walgett

Walgett is a town in northern New South Wales, Australia, and the seat of Walgett Shire. It is near the junctions of the Barwon and Namoi Rivers and the Kamilaroi and Castlereagh Highways. In 2021, Walgett had a population of 1,377.

In the 2021 census, there were 5,253 people in the Walgett Local Government Area. Of these 50.7% were male and 49.3% were female. Aboriginal and/or Torres Strait Islander people made up 21.2% of the population. Walgett takes its name from an Aboriginal word meaning 'the meeting place of two rivers'. The town was listed as one of the most socially disadvantaged areas in the State according to the 2015 Dropping Off The Edge report.

== History ==
The area was inhabited by the Gamilaroi (also spelt Kamilaroi) nation of Indigenous peoples before European settlement.

Yuwaalayaay (also known as Yuwalyai, Euahlayi, Yuwaaliyaay, Gamilaraay, Kamilaroi, Yuwaaliyaayi) is an Australian Aboriginal language spoken on Yuwaalayaay country. It is closely related to the Gamilaraay and Yuwaalaraay languages. The Yuwaalayaay language region includes the landscape within the local government boundaries of the Shire of Balonne, including the town of Dirranbandi as well as the border town of Goodooga extending to Walgett and the Narran Lakes in New South Wales.

A post office was gazetted for "Wallgett on the Barwin River" in 1851 and the town sites were surveyed in 1859. The district would have been occupied prior to this by squatters and their livestock. The town of Walgett was proclaimed on 20 March 1885. The surveyor Arthur Dewhurst mapped the town, naming three streets after British Prime Ministers: Fox (main street—Castlereagh Highway), Pitt and Peel. Arthur Street was named after another surveyor. Walgett Courthouse was built in 1865.

Walgett was a port in the late 19th century for paddle steamers that plied the Murray-Darling river system. The first steamer reached Walgett in 1861 and travelled to the town regularly until c.1870.

Euroka Station, 10 miles (16 km) south of the town on the Castlereagh Highway, was purchased by Fred Wolseley in 1876 and was the site of the invention of the Wolseley Shearing Machine. The machine was tested at Bourke in 1888 on 184,000 sheep and eventually revolutionised the shearing industry.

Walgett's history includes the Freedom Rides in the mid-1960s. The Freedom Riders, consisting in the main of Sydney university students, including Charles Perkins, arrived in Walgett on 15 February 1965. They protested outside the Walgett RSL Club because they had been told the club was refusing to admit Indigenous ex-servicemen. They also picketed a ladies' dress shop (Sheehan's), protesting the fact that the proprietor would not allow Indigenous women to try on dresses. After their protests the Freedom Riders left town and headed for Narrabri, when a short distance from Walgett their bus was allegedly forced off the road by a car driven by a local farmer. This event led to Walgett, the Freedom Riders and the plight of Indigenous Australians receiving national and international media attention.

== Population ==
Historical population
Year	Pop.	±%
1954	1,348	—
1961	1,726	+28.0%
1966	2,024	+17.3%
1971	2,284	+12.8%
1976	2,253	−1.4%
1981	2,157	−4.3%
1986	2,151	−0.3%
1991	2,091	−2.8%
1996	1,970	−5.8%
2001	1,821	−7.6%
2006	1,735	−4.7%
2011	1,625	−6.3%
2016	1,546	−4.9%
2021	1,377	−10.9%
Source: Australian Bureau of Statistics data.

According to the 2021 census, the population of Walgett was 1,377.

- Aboriginal and Torres Strait Islander people made up 23.7% of the population.
- 50.8% of people were born in Australia and 50.5% of people spoke only English at home.
- The most common responses for religion were No Religion 23.3%, Catholic 14.3% and Anglican 11.8%.

According to the 2016 census, the population of Walgett was 1,546.

- Aboriginal and Torres Strait Islander people made up 49.2% of the population.
- 80.1% of people were born in Australia and 82.9% of people spoke only English at home.
- The most common responses for religion were Anglican 29.4%, Catholic 26.8% and No Religion 21.7%.

== Climate ==
Walgett has a hot, semi-arid climate (BSh) with hot to very hot summers and mild to cool winters with occasional frosts. Summer temperatures frequently rise above 40 °C (104 °F), and a maximum temperature of 49.2 °C (120.6 °F) was recorded on 3 January 1903, which is one of the hottest temperatures recorded in the state. The annual rainfall is fairly low, at 439.0 millimetres (17.28 in) which falls fairly evenly throughout the year; however, summer rainfall usually falls as heavy but infrequent downpours associated with thunderstorms; winter rain is usually very light, but can last for days at a time.

In December 2018 amidst drought, the Barwon River at Walgett ceased flowing, reduced to a series of stagnant pools. Bore water from the Great Artesian Basin being used by the town was of questionable quality in relation to the Australian drinking water guidelines, leading to concerns of usage within the town.

Climate data for Walgett Airport (30º02'24"S, 148º07'12"E, 133 m AMSL) (1993-2024 normals and extremes)
Month	Jan	Feb	Mar	Apr	May	Jun	Jul	Aug	Sep	Oct	Nov	Dec	Year
Record high °C (°F)	49.1 (120.4)	47.9 (118.2)	42.6 (108.7)	36.7 (98.1)	30.8 (87.4)	27.0 (80.6)	29.0 (84.2)	36.1 (97.0)	39.2 (102.6)	42.0 (107.6)	45.7 (114.3)	46.6 (115.9)	49.1 (120.4)
Mean daily maximum °C (°F)	36.0 (96.8)	34.6 (94.3)	32.0 (89.6)	27.6 (81.7)	22.6 (72.7)	18.9 (66.0)	18.6 (65.5)	21.1 (70.0)	25.3 (77.5)	29.1 (84.4)	32.1 (89.8)	34.5 (94.1)	27.7 (81.9)
Mean daily minimum °C (°F)	20.9 (69.6)	20.0 (68.0)	17.0 (62.6)	11.8 (53.2)	7.3 (45.1)	4.9 (40.8)	3.6 (38.5)	4.3 (39.7)	7.9 (46.2)	12.0 (53.6)	16.1 (61.0)	18.4 (65.1)	12.0 (53.6)
Record low °C (°F)	8.1 (46.6)	7.1 (44.8)	4.6 (40.3)	−1.7 (28.9)	−3.0 (26.6)	−5.2 (22.6)	−6.0 (21.2)	−5.0 (23.0)	−2.6 (27.3)	1.0 (33.8)	3.5 (38.3)	6.7 (44.1)	−6.0 (21.2)
Average precipitation mm (inches)	54.8 (2.16)	47.5 (1.87)	40.8 (1.61)	22.2 (0.87)	31.6 (1.24)	33.4 (1.31)	26.4 (1.04)	19.4 (0.76)	28.1 (1.11)	39.7 (1.56)	50.6 (1.99)	46.0 (1.81)	440.4 (17.34)
Average precipitation days (≥ 1.0 mm)	4.7	4.1	4.0	2.6	3.3	3.7	3.3	2.4	3.2	4.1	4.6	4.8	44.8
Average afternoon relative humidity (%)	29	35	33	32	40	48	45	35	32	28	29	26	34
Average dew point °C (°F)	10.9 (51.6)	12.9 (55.2)	10.5 (50.9)	7.1 (44.8)	6.5 (43.7)	6.0 (42.8)	4.5 (40.1)	2.9 (37.2)	3.7 (38.7)	4.1 (39.4)	7.0 (44.6)	7.9 (46.2)	7.0 (44.6)
Source: Bureau of Meteorology (1993-2024 normals)

== Crime ==
The town, like many other remote communities, has problems with crime linked to the abuse of alcohol and other drugs. As a result, many businesses have metal shutters to protect their premises from street crime.

The suspected murder of 31-year-old mother-of-two Roxlyn Margaret Bowie occurred in June 1982 when she vanished from her Walgett family home. A 2014 coronial inquest did not determine the cause of death, and her body has not been located. A one million dollar reward was offered in December 2018 for information leading to the identity of her killer. Her husband was arrested in late 2019 and charged with her murder.

On the night of 9 December 1994, nurse Sandra Hoare was abducted from the Peg Cross Ward of the Walgett District Hospital by Vester and Brendan Fernando, and forced to walk to a nearby sporting field where she was raped by both men. She was then forced to walk further to the perimeter of the nearby Walgett aerodrome where she was murdered by Vester Fernando using a machete to sever her neck in a near-decapitation. Both men were arrested, charged, convicted and sentenced to life in prison. Brendan was later stabbed and killed by Vester in Lithgow Correctional Centre in an apparent revenge attack for giving evidence against him prior to and during their trials. Vester Fernando's life sentence was compounded by his conviction for murdering his accomplice.

== Economy ==
It is a regional hub for wool, wheat and cotton industries. It is the gateway to the New South Wales opal fields at Lightning Ridge to the north and The Grawin to the west. The main crop farmed in the district is wheat; however, the drought has caused an increase in the farming of lucerne and other good hay crops.

== Sport ==
Walgett has a strong rugby league culture, and former St. George Dragons player Ricky Walford, whom the town's Rugby league ground is named after, played for Walgett Juniors. Walgett is the home of the Walgett Dragons and Newtown Wanderers rugby league clubs, both of which compete in the Barwon Darling Rugby League. The Dragons made eight consecutive grand finals from 2012 to 2019, winning the 2012, 2013, 2016 and 2019 premierships. The Wanderers have not enjoyed the same level of success as of yet, but are a competitive side within the competition.

The Walgett Rams is the local rugby union side in the Western Plains Rugby Union competition.

The predominant summer sport of the town is cricket. The local competition consists of teams from Walgett, Cumborah, Lightning Ridge, Collarenebri and Goodooga.

The Walgett and District Sporting Club provides facilities for tennis, golf and lawn bowls. The original Tennis Club was situated on the south side of the town in the mid- to late 1960s and 1970s prior to merging with the Bowling Club to become the Walgett District Sporting Club. Likewise, the original Golf Club that was situated on river country some eight kilometres to the west of the town, also merged with the Sporting Club on the north edge of the town allowing the golf course to be re-established along the Namoi River adjacent to the club house proper. The greens are sand and oil as opposed to conventional grass.

The local college hosts two major football carnivals each year. The Ricky Walford Shield and the Neville Thorne Shield are knockout rugby league competitions held in August by the primary school and the high school respectively.

The Walgett Aero Club was established in the town in 1958 with a club house and hangar built at the aerodrome with support from the Walgett Shire Council. The club's first two aircraft purchased in its first years were DH-82 Tiger Moths – registrations VH-BAR and VH-WON carrying the name of the nearby Barwon River. As the club progressed and thrived with the appointment of a chief flying instructor in the early 1960s, it eventually modernised its fleet to include the likes of Cessna 172, Cessna 150 and Piper Comanche 210 aircraft. In 2008 the club celebrated its fiftieth anniversary, and continues to be a prosperous part of the transport and aviation hub of the far north of the state.

== Education ==
The pre-school, primary school and high school were re-structured in 2003 into the Walgett Community College. The college is a unique educational institution, and gave birth to the successful Yaama Maliyaa group that won several national awards in Young Achievers Australia in 2005.

== Media ==
Walgett publishes a weekly newspaper called the Walgett Spectator that has been in continuous production since the 1800s, despite a fire razing the business premises in 1903.

Outback Radio 2WEB (based in Bourke, 231 km to the west of Walgett) broadcasts around the area on 104.3FM.

== References in popular culture ==
The fictional character Betty in the sitcom Hey Dad..! was from Walgett.

Banjo Paterson wrote two poems featuring Walgett – "A Walgett Episode" and "Been There Before". In Been There Before Paterson relates the story of a visitor to the town who is down on his luck and who makes a wager that he can throw a stone from one bank of the river to another. The locals who know that stones of a reasonable mass are a rarity along the banks think they have fooled the visitor. However while...

The yokels laughed at his hopes o'erthrown,
And he stood awhile like a man in a dream;
Then out of his pocket he fetched a stone,
And pelted it over the silent stream—
He had been there before: he had wandered down
On a previous visit to Walgett town.

Paterson could not decide on which river the town lies. In the former poem he correctly says "Walgett, on the Barwon side", whereas in the latter he says "The Darling River, at Walgett town". The Darling River is formed at Brewarrina, much further west than Walgett, from the confluence of the Barwon and Culgoa Rivers.

The Barwon-Darling River system is described as the Barwon River from Mungindi to where it joins the Culgoa River near Brewarrina then becomes the Darling River flowing to the Menindee Lakes.

Walgett lies on the Namoi River, which skirts the east and north-east of the town from where it eventually joins with the Barwon River some five kilometres north-west of the town. The Namoi River rises on the west slopes of the Moonbi Range and Great Dividing Range near Niangala at the convergence of the Macdonald River and Boundary Creek, and flows generally west, joined by 27 tributaries, including the Peel, Manilla and Mooki rivers, before reaching that confluence with the Barwon River.

== Notable people ==
- John Quayle – former NRL player and administrator
- Ricky Walford – former NRL player
