= Rivers of Queensland =

The principal topographic feature of Queensland is the series of low highlands and plateaus called the Great Dividing Range, which extend from north to south roughly parallel to the coast of the Coral Sea of the South Pacific Ocean. The four main categories of rivers in Queensland are those that rise on the eastern slopes of the Great Dividing Range and flow eastwards to the sea, the Coastal rivers; those that rise on the other side of the crest of the range and flow north-westward, towards the Gulf of Carpentaria, the Gulf rivers; those that also rise on the other side of the crest of the range and flow south-westward, forming part of the Murray–Darling basin, the Murray–Darling rivers; and those that generally rise in the west of the state and flow south-westward, towards the Lake Eyre basin, the Lake Eyre rivers. One river is isolated and does not flow towards any other basin or sea.

== Major rivers ==
The following rivers are the longest river systems, by length.

Longest rivers in Queensland by length (September 2008)
Order	River name	Length		Region(s)	Notes
Order	River name	km	mi	Region(s)	Notes
1	Cooper Creek	1,113	692	Lake Eyre Basin	River course is located in Queensland and South Australia
2	Warrego	1,380	857		
3	Paroo	1,210	752		
4	Flinders	1,004	624		Entire course of the river is located in Queensland.
5	Diamantina	941	585		

== Coastal rivers ==
Coastal rivers in Queensland
River name	Length	
River name	km	miles
Annan	66	41
Barron	165	103
Bizant	37	23
Black	33	21
Bloomfield	18	11
Bohle	37	23
Boyne	125	78
Brisbane	344	214
Burdekin	886	551
Burnett	435	270
Burrum	31	19
Caboolture	46	29
Calliope	98	61
Chester	15	9
Claudie	23	14
Coomera	80	50
Daintree	140	87
Don	60	37
Elliot	49	30
Elliott	25	16
Endeavour	140	87
Fitzroy	480	298
Gregory	321	199
Herbert	288	179
Haughton	110	68
Howick	25	16
Hull	21	13
Jeannie	43	27
Johnstone	200	124
Kolan	195	121
Lockhart	36	22
Logan	184	114
Marrett	46	29
Maroochy	26	16
Mary	291	181
Mcivor	65	40
Mooloolah	70	43
Moresby	19	12
Mossman	24	15
Mowbray	13	8
Mulgrave	70	43
Murray	70	43
Nerang	62	39
Nesbit	41	25
Noosa	60	37
North Kennedy	117	73
O'Connell	34	21
Olive	70	43
Pascoe	119	74
Pimpama	80	50
Pine	7	4
Pioneer	120	75
Proserpine	69	43
Ross	49	30
Russell	59	37
Seymour	19	12
Starcke	38	24
Stewart	96	60
Styx	33	21
Tully	133	83

== Gulf rivers ==
Gulf rivers in Queensland
River name	Length	
River name	km	miles

== Murray–Darling rivers ==
Murray–Darling rivers in Queensland
River name	Length	
River name	km	miles
Balonne	479	298
Bokhara	347	216
Boomi	231	144
Condamine	657	408
Culgoa	489	304
Langlo	440	273
Little Weir	78	48
Macintyre	319	198
Maranoa	519	322
Merivale	250	155
Moonie	542	337
Narran	299	186
Nive (Qld)	263	163
Nivelle	19	12
Paroo	1,210	752
Pike Creek (Qld)	117	73
Severn (Qld)	90	56
Ward (Central West Qld)	455	283
Warrego	1,380	857
Weir (Qld)	470	292

== Lake Eyre rivers ==
Lake Eyre rivers in Queensland
River name	Length	
River name	km	miles
Barcoo		
Burke		
Cooper Creek	1,113	692
Flinders	1,004	624
Georgina	1,130	702
Hamilton		
Ranken		
Thomson		
Torrens		

== Isolated river ==
Isolated river in Queensland
River name	Length	
River name	km	miles
Bulloo	600	373

== See also ==
- List of rivers of Australia for an alphabetical listing including rivers in other Australian states
