= Yuwaalaraay =

Aboriginal Australian people of New South Wales

Yuwaalaraay; Euahlayi; Euayelai; Eualeyai; Ualarai; Yuwaaliyaay; Yuwallarai

Regions with significant populations
- North-western New South Wales, Australia

Languages
- Yuwaalaraay dialect of Gamilaraay; Australian English

The Yuwaalaraay, also spelt Euahlayi, Euayelai, Eualeyai, Ualarai, Yuwaaliyaay and Yuwallarai, are an Aboriginal Australian people of north-western New South Wales.

== Name and language ==
Yuwaalaraay
- Ualarai
- Native to: Australia
- Region: New South Wales
- Ethnicity: Yuwaalaraay
- Language family: Pama–Nyungan: Wiradhuric; Gamilaraay; Yuwaalaraay

Language codes
- ISO 639-3: –
- Glottolog: yuwa1242 Yuwaalaraay yuwa1243 Yuwaalayaay
- AIATSIS: D27 Yuwaalaraay, D54 Yuwaalayaay
- ELP: Yuwaalaraay

The ethnonym Yuwaalaraay derives from their word for "no" (yuwaal) to which a form of the comitative suffix, -iyaay/ayaay/-araay, is attached. (Note: Norman Tindale claimed that the name transcribed earlier as Ualarai came from the word for "yes" (u'al/wol/wal). This waal is probably a short form of yuwaal. (Giacon 2014, p. 3))

While AUSTLANG cites Euahlayi, Ualarai, Euhahlayi, and Juwalarai as synonyms for the Gamilaraay language in earlier sources, more recent sources suggest different distinctions. Yuwaalaraay is one of six dialects or languages of Gamilaraay.

According to Robert M. W. Dixon, Ualarai is a Wiradhuric tongue, a dialect (Yuwaalaraay) of Gamilaraay. The Yuwaalaraay distinguished various kinds of Gamilaraay, telling K. Langloh Parker:

With us, Byamee the name is not derived from the verb to make-which is gimberleegoo; maker, gimberlah --this word is also used in the Kamilaroi tribes, some of which are within a hundred and fifty miles of us. But the Kamilaroi that Ridley knew are some three and four hundred miles away, so the language is sure to have variations; our Euahlayi language has only a few of the same words as the Kamilaroi.

Parker herself worked mainly with a particular Yuwaalaraay subgroup, the Nhunggabarra, whose clan name derives from the word nhungga ('kurrajong tree').

== Country ==
The Yuwaalaraay traditional lands stretch over an estimated 4,600 square miles (12,000 km^{2}). It is on the Narran River and from the Narran Wetlands (Terewah) through to Angledool near the Queensland border. It takes in Walgett to the southeast. Running southwest, it extends from the Birrie and Bokhara rivers to Brewarrina. The western frontier lies between the Culgoa and Birrie rivers. The northernmost area covered by Yuwaalaraay country extends as far as Dirranbandi, Queensland, where the Culgoa and Balonne rivers meet.

Yuwaalaraay country is rather dry even over winter, which permitted a longer gathering and conservation of seeds as a food resource.

== Social organisation ==
The Yuwaalaraay are organised in terms of matrilineal descent.

== Economy ==
They were proto-agriculturalists, who used the grasslands of their area, harvesting foods for storage, a practice (called generically konakandi or 'dung food') (Note: A Western desert tribal term, from kona, 'dung', and kandi, 'vegetable', as opposed to koka ('meats') -food. (Tindale 1974, p. 102)) also found among several other tribes such as the Iliaura and Watjarri. The surplus was stored (yarmmara, 'storage') in caves, enabling women to free up their time, since the existence of reserves relieved them of the need to gather in edible foodstuffs every day.

Women and men worked at the harvest. The women would cull the grass heads with their ears, still green, so they could be stacked within a brushwood enclosure that was then set alight. The seeds were winnowed by stirring through the heap with long sticks, and gathered on opossum skins. Then the men took over as threshers, separating the husks by alternately beating and then stamping the seeds laid in two holes, on rectangular the other circular. The refined product then underwent further purifying by employing wiri, 'bark dishes', and jubbil. The resulting seedstock was then packed in skin bags, Once taken out of storage, the seeds were prepared by grinding then, with additions of water, on dajuri millstones and cooking the cakes over ashes. Milling was also done with a nether millstone, jamara, (Note: Jamara was a word borrowed by diffusion from the Garrwa, who live 1,400 kilometres (900 mi) away to their north. (Tindale 1974, p. 105)) a word that also meant the milled seed itself. Coolibah eucalypts yielded branches that were piled on hard ground and left to dry until they yielded up their seed which was then milled.

== Mythology ==
Reports on Aboriginal belief systems often drove controversies over whether Aboriginal Australians understood the nature of conception or whether they recognised a supreme deity, one of the criteria for the kind of civilisation Western colonialism promoted. Some maintained they did, in subscribing to a belief in Baiame. Andrew Lang asked Mrs Parker what the Yuwaalaraay view was in regard to this. She was told that their word for the "All-Seeing Spirit" was Nurrulburu, and for the "All-Hearing", Winnanulburu. As for Baiame, (Byamee) it meant a burul euray ('big man'), one with totem names for every part of his body, down to each finger and toe. On his departure he distributed his totem attributes to all, which they would take from their mother, so that marriage was interdicted for people with the same mother (totem). (Note: Their source was a blind octogenarian, Yndda Dulleebah. (Parker & Lang 1898, p. 492)) He dwelt in his sky camp with his son Bailah Burrah. He had an earthly subordinate Gayandi (Note: Cooresponding to the Daramulun among the Gamilaraay and the Wiradjuri (Parker & Lang 1898, p. 494)) who was a ceremonial overseer to the mysteries of tribal initiation.

William Ridley prevailed upon an elder named Ippai Dinawan (Dinoun) (Note: "Ippai being one of the Euahlayi marriage classes, and Dinoun being Ridley's spelling of the current dhinawan, which is the emu's name in Kamilaroi/Euahlayi, and was [Ippai Dinawan's] totem, so he should have been knowledgeable about the Emu." (Fuller et al. 2014, p. 173)) of the Gingi tribe, known among whites as King Rory, to recount his tribe's legends concerning the firmament. The conversation place on the evening of 10 July at Gingi. Ippai Dinawan has been identified as likely an elder of the Yuwaalaraay.

The evening was beautifully clear. Three planets were visible: Venus, Zindigindoer (at Gundamine, on the Namoi, Venus is called Boian-gummer; higher up it is Gūnū); Mars, Gumba (fat); Saturn, Wuzgul (a small bird). The Milky-way is called Worambul (a common word, generally spelt by the colonists [as] warrambool), a watercourse, with a grove, abounding in food, flowers, fruit, and all that is desirable. To this Worambul the souls of the good ascend when their bodies are committed to the grave, and they are supposed to be cognisant to some extent of what takes place on earth, and even to have power to help their fellow men below when invoked. For when Mr. Sparke had promised King Rory to take him to the races if the rain ceased, and the continuance of rain threatened to disappoint Rory's hopes, he appealed to his departed friends in the Milky-way, by cutting pieces of bark here and there and throwing them on the ground, and crying pu-a pu-a, until the black fellows above put a stop to the rain, and so enabled him to go to the races. This mode of obtaining fine weather he says he learnt from his fathers.

The Southern Cross is called Zūŭ (a shrub called by our colonists tea-tree); the dark space at the foot of the Cross is called gao-ergi (emu)-the bird is sitting under the tree. The two bright stars [Alpha and Beta Centauri], pointing to the Cross, are Murrai (cockatoos). The Magellan Clouds are two bulralga (native companions). Canopus is Wunmba (stupid or deaf): it seems strange that the star which the Arabs regard as the eye of the Divine Majesty should be thus designated; but perhaps the very beauty of the star, tempting the people to invoke aid which was not granted, provoked them to call the charmer who would not listen to their entreaties by this reproachful name. The star is fair to the sight, but "wumba" to the prayers of the Murri. Antares is Guddar (a lizard). In the tail of the Scorpion, two bright stars across the Milky-way are called gigeriga (small green parrots) The long dark space between two branches of the Milky-way near Scorpio, is called Wurrawilbūrū (demon). The S-shaped line of stars between the Northern Crown and Scorpio is called Mundëwur, i.e., notches cut in a spiral form on the trunk of a tree to enable a black fellow to climb up. The chief star in the Peacock is called Mūrgū (night cuckoo). Corona, the four stars, are called Bundar (a kangaroo); Fomalhaut-Gani (a small iguana); Spica virginis-Gurie (a small crested parrot); the Pleiades-Worrul (bees'-nest). At Gundamine, on the Namoi, the Pleiades are called Gindemar; higher up the river, at Burburgate, this constellation is called Dindima (woman), and the Hyades Giwīr (man).

Sirius is called Zāzarī at Burburgate; Arcturus-Guenmbila, also Guebilla (bright red); the Northern Crown-Mullion Wollai (eagles' camp or nest), when this constellation, which is more like a nest than a crown, is about due north on the meridian. Altair, the chief star in Aquila, rises, and is called Mullion-ga (an eagle in action)-it is springing up to watch the nest. Shortly afterwards her more majestic mate, Vega, springs up, and is also called Mullion-ga. The whole vision of the nest, and the royal birds springing up to guard their young, is worthy of a place among the ancient myths of astronomy.

== Alternative names ==
According to Tindale:Tindale 1974, p. 199

- Brewarrana
- Gingi (station name over the river from Walgett)
- Jualjai, Juwaljai, Yuwalyai
- Wallarai, Wolleroi, Walleri, Woleroi, Wollaroi
- Yowalri, Yuolary, Euahlayi, Yourilri, Youahlayi
- Yualai, Yualeai, Yerraleroi
- Yualarai, Yualloroi, Yowaleri, Uollaroi, Youallerie, Yualari

== Some words ==
- wirrinun ("wise folk", namely, any male or female gifted with spiritual power)
- wongo ("no")

Some modern terms shared with Gamilaraay speakers:

- dhimbha (sheep, perhaps from jumbuck)
- milambaraay (milk cow, from milam, borrowed from English 'milk')
- wamba (white man, borrowed from a Wangaaybuwan adjective meaning 'ugly-looking', referring also to a creature, the devil devil)

== Sources ==
- Dixon, R. M. W. (2002). Australian Languages: Their Nature and Development. Cambridge University Press. ISBN 978-0-521-47378-1.
- Fuller, Robert S.; Anderson, Michael G.; Norris, Ray P.; Trudgett, Michelle (March 2014). "The Emu Sky Knowledge of the Kamilaroi and Euahlayi Peoples". Journal of Astronomical History and Heritage. 17 (2): 171–179. arXiv:1403.0304. Bibcode:2014JAHH...17..171F. doi:10.3724/SP.J.1440-2807.2014.02.04.
- Giacon, John (October 2014). A grammar of Yuwaalaraay and Gamilaraay: a description of two New South Wales languages based on 160 years of records (PhD thesis). Australian National University.
- Mathews, R. H. (1902). "Languages of some native tribes of Queensland, New South Wales, and Victoria". Proceedings of the Royal Society of New South Wales. 36: 135–190. doi:10.5962/p.359384.
- Parker, K. Langloh (1905). The Euahlayi Tribe, a Study of Aboriginal Life in Australia. A. Constable.
- Parker, K. Langloh; Lang, Andrew (December 1898). "Australian Religion". Folklore. 10 (4): 489–495. JSTOR 1253370.
- Ridley, William (1873). "Report on Australian Languages and Traditions". The Journal of the Anthropological Institute of Great Britain and Ireland. 2: 257–275. doi:10.2307/2841174. JSTOR 2841174.
- Tindale, Norman Barnett (1974). Aboriginal Tribes of Australia: Their Terrain, Environmental Controls, Distribution, Limits, and Proper Names. Australian National University Press. ISBN 978-0-708-10741-6.
