= Birrie River =

Birrie Birree River
- Location of Birrie River mouth in New South Wales

Location
- Country: Australia
- State: New South Wales
- Region: Orana

Physical characteristics
- Source: Bokhara River
  - location: near Goodooga
  - coordinates: 29°03′11″S 147°29′34″E
  - elevation: 147 m (482 ft)
- Mouth: Culgoa River
  - location: north–east of Bourke and north–west of Brewarrina
  - coordinates: 29°45′04″S 146°34′37″E
  - elevation: 115 m (377 ft)
- Length: 197 km (122 mi)

Basin features
- River system: Darling River catchment, Murray–Darling basin
- Tributaries
  - right: Yamba Creek, Marion Creek, Wongal Cowal

Birrie River, a perennial river that is part of the Upper Darling catchment within the Murray–Darling basin, is located in the north-west slopes region of New South Wales, Australia.

The river leaves the Bokhara River, about 7 kilometres (4.3 mi) north–east of the village of Goodooga, and flows generally south and west, joined by three minor tributaries before reaching its confluence with the Culgoa River, north–east of Bourke and north–west of Brewarrina, descending 32 metres (105 ft) over its 197-kilometre (122 mi) course.

== See also ==
- Rivers of New South Wales
