= March 2010 Queensland floods =

Heavy rain in March 2010 saw much of south western and central Queensland undergo major flooding. The floods saw inundation of the towns of Charleville, Roma, St George and Theodore among others. Major rivers affected include the Warrego River, Balonne River, Bulloo River, Paroo River and the Dawson River.

== Floods ==
The floods were caused by rainfall generated by a monsoon trough described by a Bureau of Meteorology forecaster as "almost like a tropical cyclone over land". Over the period 1–3 March, rainfall totals of between 100–300 mm (4 to 12 inches) were observed in the area. This water ran into already saturated rivers and creeks in the area.

The floods are estimated to have affected an area of Queensland larger in size than the Australian state of Victoria and thought to have caused hundreds of millions of dollars' worth of damage to infrastructure such as roads and railways. Losses from cotton crops destroyed at Theodore and the area around St George and Dirranbandi are expected to be significant.

The floods, described by the Queensland Minister for Primary Industries Tim Mulherin as the "worst flood in 120 years" are however expected to provide a billion dollar boost to the local economy, following the "worst drought since Federation" The floods have seen a large increase in the Australian plague locust population and the Australian Plague Locust Commission is concerned the locusts will head south and destroy what is expected to be a bumper winter grain crop. The flood has seen an increase in the mosquito population with fogging taking place in Charleville, Augathella and Morven.

Floodwaters are continuing to head downstream with the town of Goodooga, New South Wales in north western New South Wales cut off by road on 20 March 2010. Rising levels in the Bokhara and Culgoa Rivers have seen the evacuation of Goodooga and Weilmoringle. Wanaaring on the Paroo River has been cut off from Bourke but the town itself was protected by a levee.

The flood has increased the amount of water held in the Murray-Darling river systems, allowing South Australia an additional 400 gigalitres of water entitlement. A river expert expects much of the floodwater will reach the Darling River and the Menindee Lakes and then through onto the Murray River. Lake Eyre is also expected to receive much of the floodwaters flowing down the Cooper Creek and Diamantina River.

On 21 March, Cyclone Ului made landfall in southeastern Queensland, producing heavy rains and flooding.

== See also ==
- 2010–11 Queensland floods
- The 2013 Queensland floods caused by Cyclone Oswald
- Floods in Australia
