= Little Weir River =

River in Australia

Little Weir
- Location of the Little Weir River mouth in New South Wales

Location
- Country: Australia
- States: Queensland, New South Wales
- Region: South Downs, Orana

Physical characteristics
- Source: Barwon River
  - location: north of Mungindi, Queensland
  - coordinates: 28°53′14″S 149°03′20″E
  - elevation: 169 m (554 ft)
- Mouth: confluence with the Barwon River
  - location: near Moyan, New South Wales
  - coordinates: 29°03′58″S 148°49′42″E
  - elevation: 153 m (502 ft)
- Length: 78 km (48 mi)

Basin features
- River system: Barwon River catchment, Murray–Darling basin

The Little Weir River, an anabranch of the Barwon River within the Murray–Darling basin, is located in the South Downs district of Queensland and the Orana district of New South Wales, Australia.

The river leaves Barwon River, north of Mungindi, Queensland, and flows generally south-west, before reaching its confluence with the Barwon River, near Moyan, in New South Wales, descending 16 metres (52 ft) over its 78-kilometre (48 mi) course.

== See also ==
- List of rivers of New South Wales
- Rivers of Queensland
- Border Rivers
