= Andrew Nixon Bridge =

- Coordinates: 28°02′38″S 148°34′01″E
- Carries: Motor vehicles, Pedestrians
- Crosses: Balonne River
- Locale: St George, Queensland, Australia

Characteristics
- Design: Beam bridge
- Material: Concrete

History
- Construction end: 1953

Location
- Interactive map of Andrew Nixon Bridge

The Andrew Nixon Bridge is a road bridge over the Balonne River in St George, Queensland, Australia. The bridge, which is part of the Balonne Highway, is the only river crossing in the area.

The bridge is sometimes covered in floodwaters, most recently during the March 2010 Queensland floods and again during the January 2011 floods. The bridge is first covered by flood waters at a height of 10.7 metres, referring to the St George flood gauge.

The bridge is located adjacent to the natural river crossing point St George's Bridge, which was named by Thomas Mitchell after being discovered on St George's Day in 1846.

The bridge is named after Andrew Nixon who was contracted in 1890 by the Queensland government to build a timber bridge across the Balonne River at St George's Bridge. This was completed in 1892 and later replaced by the current Andrew Nixon bridge and Jack Taylor Weir in 1953.
