= E.J. Beardmore Dam =

Beardmore Dam
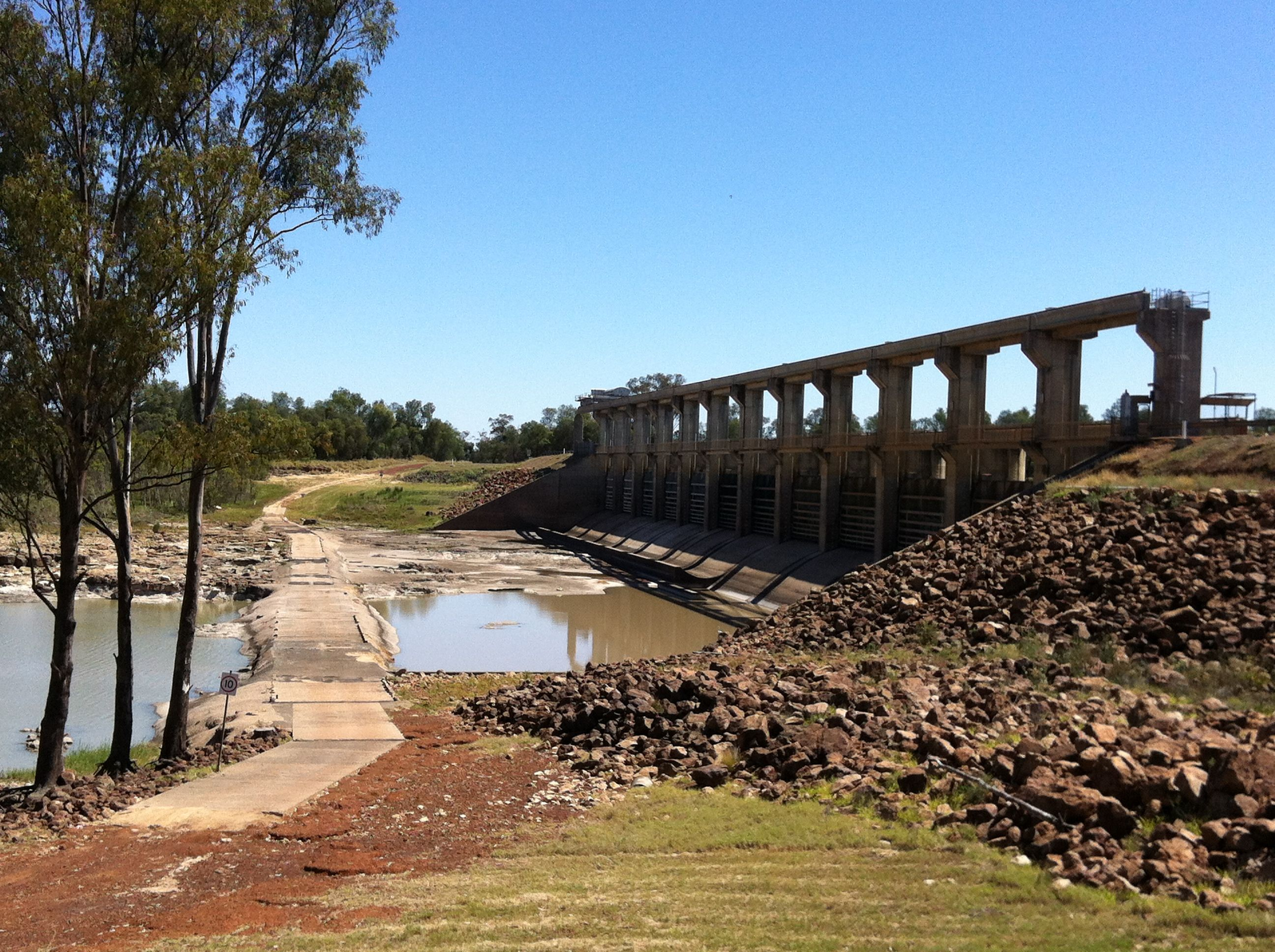
- The Beardmore Dam viewed from below the dam wall

- Location of the Beardmore Dam in Queensland
- Official name: E. J. Beardmore Dam
- Country: Australia
- Location: South West Queensland
- Coordinates: 27°54′22″S 148°38′42″E
- Purpose: Irrigation; water supply
- Status: Operational
- Construction began: 1968
- Opening date: 1972
- Operator: SunWater

Dam and spillways
- Type of dam: Embankment dam
- Impounds: Balonne River
- Height: 15.2 m (50 ft)
- Length: 2,571 m (8,435 ft)
- Dam volume: 115×10^{3} m^{3} (4.1×10^{6} cu ft)
- Spillways: One
- Spillway type: Uncontrolled
- Spillway capacity: 5,550 m^{3}/s (196,000 cu ft/s)

Reservoir
- Creates: Lake Kajarabie
- Total capacity: 81,800 ML (18.0×10^{9} imp gal; 21.6×10^{9} US gal)
- Catchment area: 75,032 km^{2} (28,970 sq mi)
- Surface area: 2,850 ha (7,000 acres)
- Maximum water depth: 12.1 m (40 ft)
- Normal elevation: 207.12 m (679.5 ft)

The E.J. Beardmore Dam, an earth-fill embankment dam with a concrete gravity wall across the Balonne River, is located in South West Queensland, Australia. The main purpose of the dam is for irrigation. The resultant reservoir is called Lake Kajarabie.

== Location and features ==
Located 17 kilometres (11 mi) north-east of St George, the dam wall was completed in 1972.

The dam wall is 15.2 metres (50 ft) high and 2,571 metres (8,435 ft) long and holds back 81,800 megalitres (18.0×10^{9} imp gal; 21.6×10^{9} US gal) of water when at full capacity. The surface area of the reservoir is 2,850 hectares (7,000 acres) and the catchment area is 75,032 square kilometres (28,970 sq mi). The uncontrolled spillway has a discharge capacity of 5,550 cubic metres per second (196,000 cu ft/s). Lake Kajarabie has an average depth of 2.4 metres (7 ft 10 in) and, when full, impounded water can back up some 75 kilometres (47 mi) along the Balonne River and almost 20 kilometres (12 mi) along the Maranoa River.

== See also ==
- List of dams and reservoirs in Queensland
