= Boomi River =

Boomi
- Location of Boomi River mouth in New South Wales
- Etymology: Indigenous: piece of wood

Location
- Country: Australia
- States: New South Wales, Queensland
- Region: South Downs, North West Slopes
- LGAs: Moree Plains, Balonne

Physical characteristics
- Source: Barwon River
  - elevation: 192 m (630 ft)
- Mouth: Macintyre River
  - location: north–east of Boomi
  - coordinates: 29°10′59″S 148°48′22″E
  - elevation: 152 m (499 ft)
- Length: 231 km (144 mi)

Basin features
- River system: Murray–Darling basin
- Tributaries
  - left: Gnoura Gnoura Creek, Doondoona Creek
  - right: Whalan Creek, Carwal Creek, Goodlayamma Creek

The Boomi River, an anabranch of the Barwon River and part of the Macintyre catchment within the Murray–Darling basin, is located in the north–western slopes region of New South Wales, flowing downstream into the South Downs region of Queensland, Australia.

== Course and features ==
The river rises about 15 kilometres (9.3 mi) east of Gundabloui, and flows generally north–east, joined by five minor tributaries, before reaching its confluence with the Macintyre River, about 12 kilometres (7.5 mi) north–east of Boomi. The river descends 40 metres (130 ft) over its 231-kilometre (144 mi) course.

The Boomi River flows past, but not through, the town of Mungindi.
