= Balonne River =

River in Queensland, Australia

Balonne
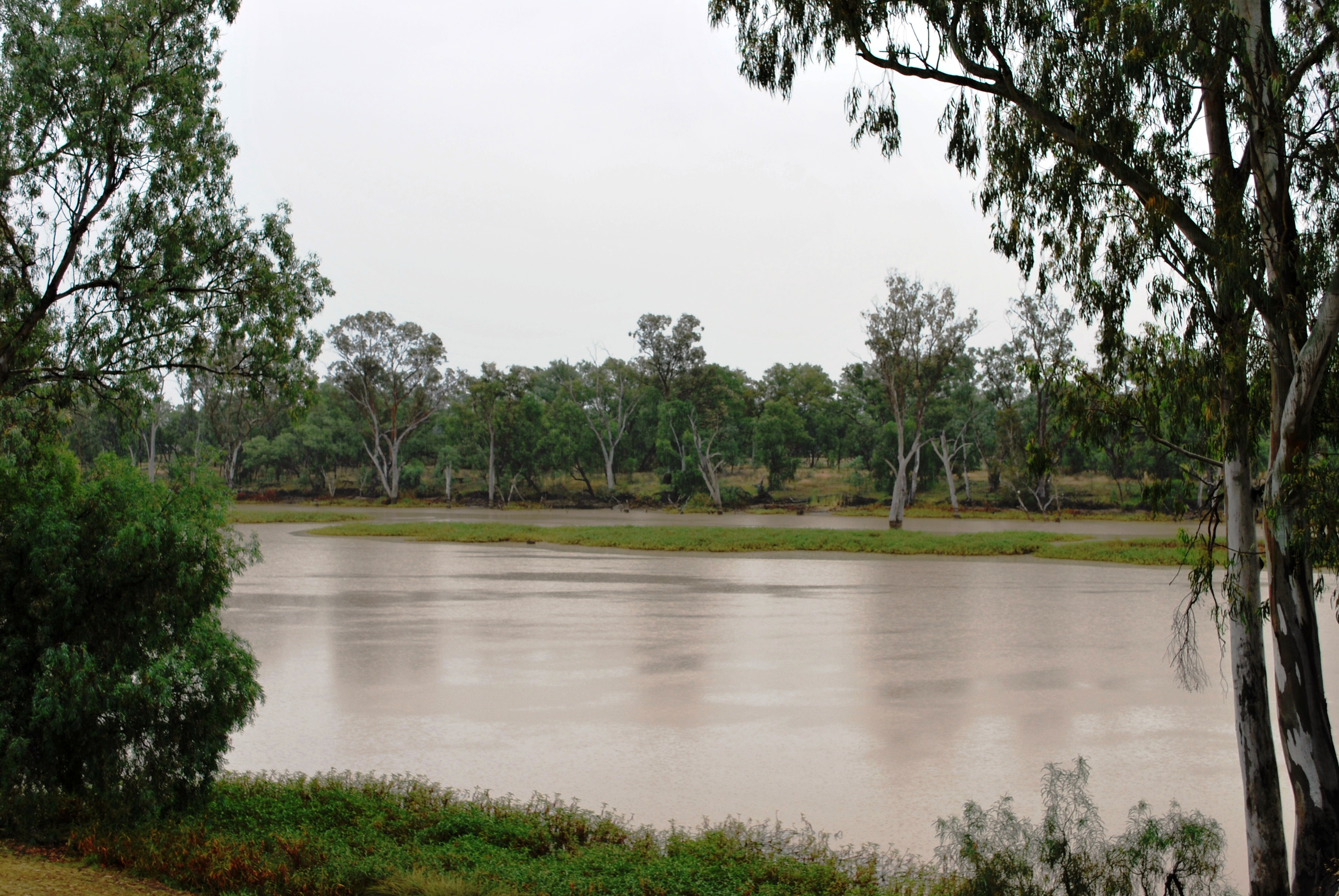
- The Balonne River at St George, Queensland

- Location of where the Balonne River branches to form the Bokhara and Narran rivers in Queensland
- Etymology: Mandandanji: water or running stream.

Location
- Country: Australia
- State: Queensland
- Region: South West Queensland
- City: St George

Physical characteristics
- Source: Condamine River
  - location: at Surat
  - elevation: 274 m (899 ft)
- Mouth: Western branch becomes Culgoa River; Eastern branch further splits into Bokhara River (west/right) and Narran River (left/east)
  - location: near Dirranbandi
  - coordinates: 28°43′27″S 148°03′6″E
  - elevation: 171 m (561 ft)
- Length: 479 km (298 mi)
- Discharge
  - average: 65 m^{3}/s (2,300 cu ft/s)

Basin features
- River system: Darling River, Murray-Darling basin
- Tributaries
  - right: Maranoa River
- Reservoir: Lake Kajarabie

The Balonne River, part of the Murray-Darling Basin system, is a short yet significant part of the inland river group of South West Queensland, Australia.

== Course and features ==
The river is a continuation of the Condamine River. After flowing through Surat the river flows south south-westerly down through the E.J. Beardmore Dam (Lake Kajarabie). Passing through St George it continues in the same south-west direction, until about 20 kilometres (12 mi) north of Dirranbandi, where it branches, with the western branch then being called the Culgoa River. The eastern branch continues on as the Balonne River through Dirranbandi. Shortly after flowing through Dirranbandi, the Balonne River again branches into the Bokhara River on the west side (the right side when going down stream) and the Narran River on the eastern (left) side. The Narran River flows into Narran Wetlands. The Bokhara River joins with the Barwon River west of Brewarrina. The confluence of the Culgoa River (a western branch of the Balonne River) and the Barwon River (which includes a former central branch of the Balonne) forms the start of the Darling River.

The Balonne-Condamine catchment area is 136,014 square kilometres (52,515 sq mi), of which an area of 603 square kilometres (233 sq mi) is composed of riverine wetlands and 559 square kilometres (216 sq mi) is estuarine wetlands.

The five longest tributaries of the Balonne River are the Condamine River, the Maranoa River, Dogwood Creek, Yuleba Creek and Tartulla Creek. At St George, the river is crossed by the Andrew Nixon Bridge which carries the Balonne Highway.

=== Water storage ===
E.J. Beardmore Dam was formed by the construction of a weir in 1972 at the junction of the Maranoa and Balonne Rivers. When the dam is full the water backs up for 70 kilometres (43 mi) along the Balonne. Downstream from Beardmore Dam is the Jack Taylor Weir, which was built in 1953. On the Balonne tributary, Dogwood Creek there is another weir, the Gill Weir, which can hold 1,050 megalitres (230×10^{6} imp gal; 280×10^{6} US gal).

== History ==
Major Thomas Mitchell crossed the Balonne River on St George's Day, 23 April 1846. Mitchell named the river after the Mandandanji word for water or running stream, balun or balonn or balonne.

== Gallery ==
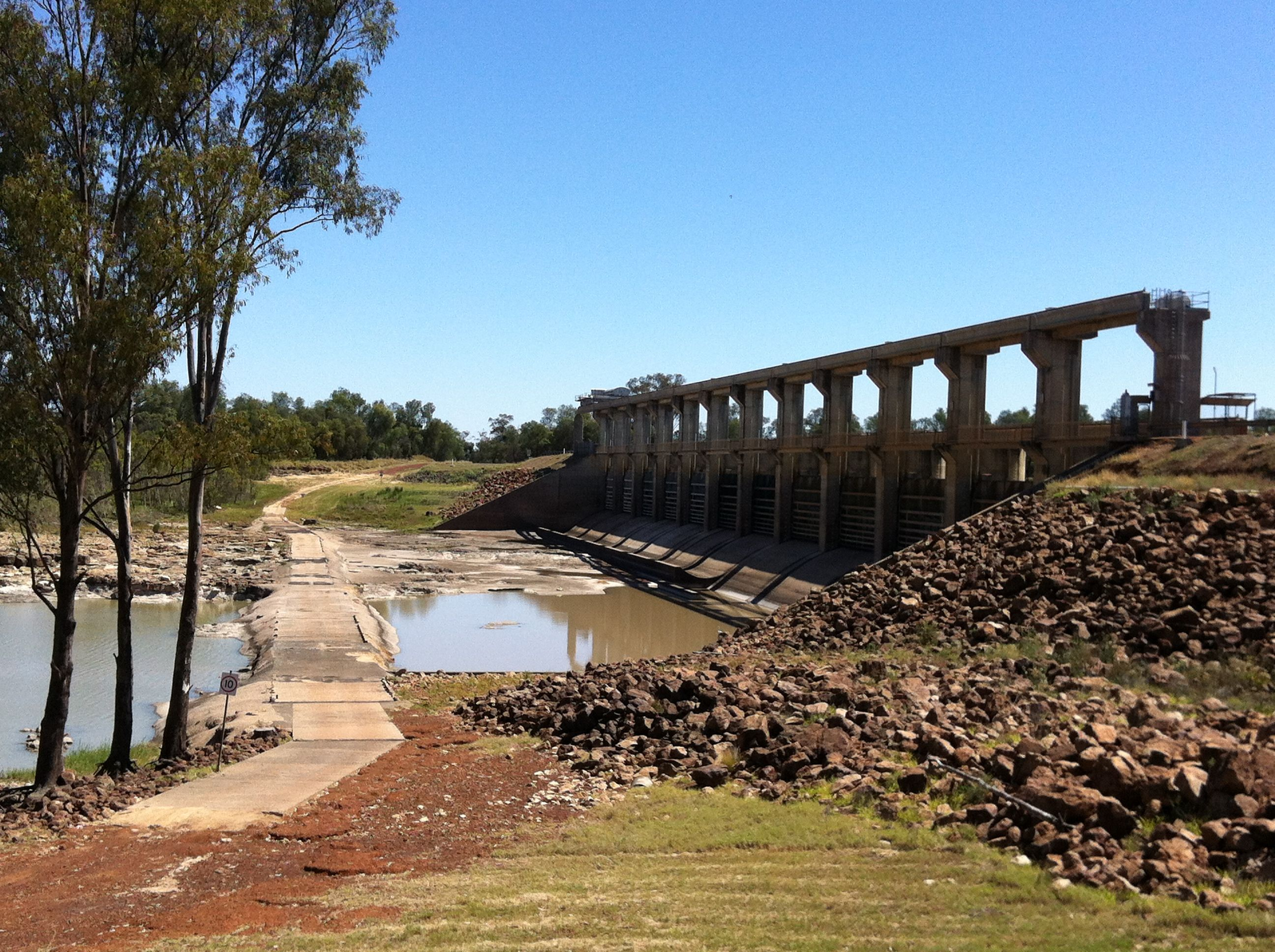
E.J. Beardmore Dam viewed from the downstream side

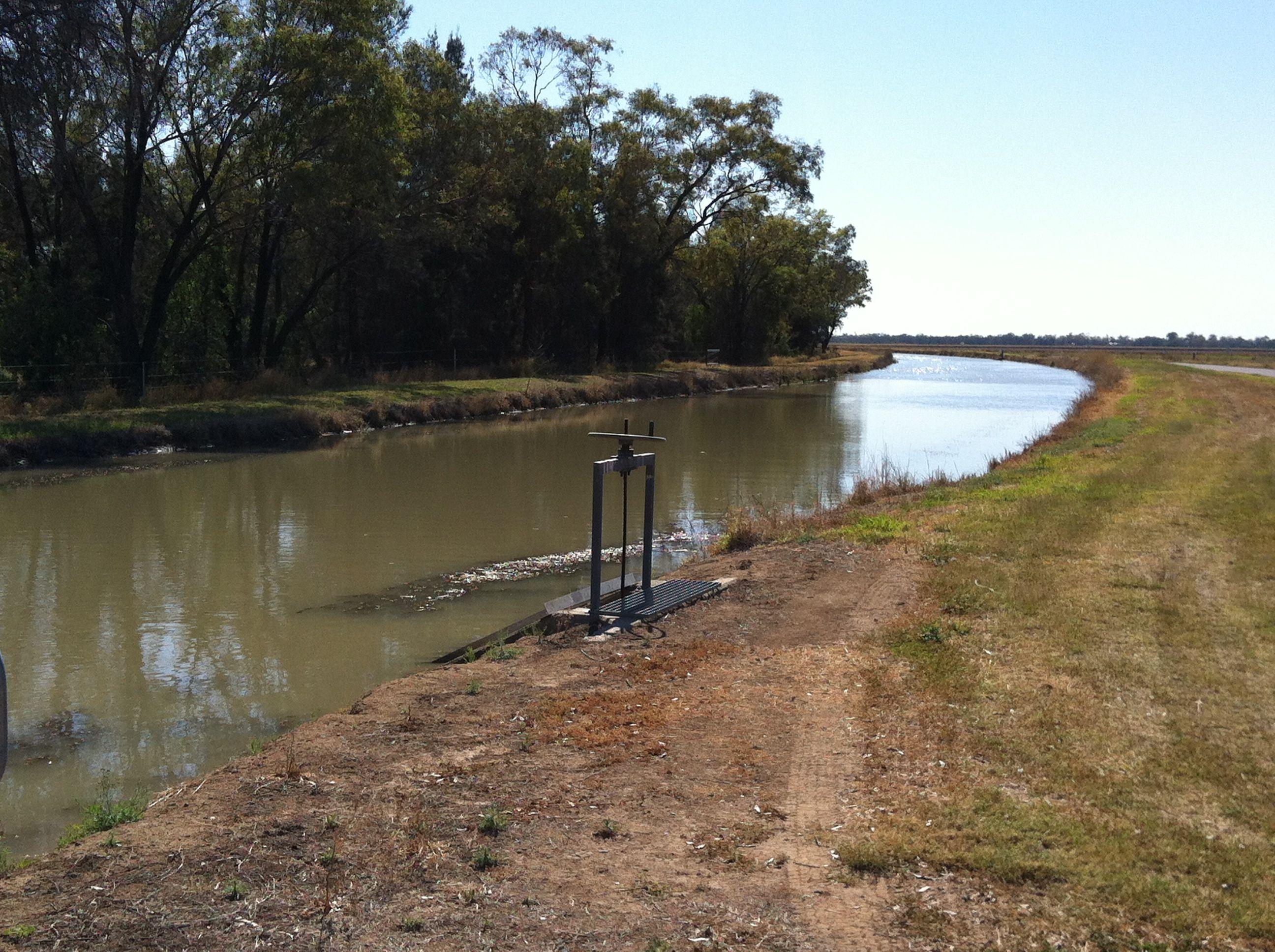
Irrigation channel for cotton fed from E.J. Beardmore Dam

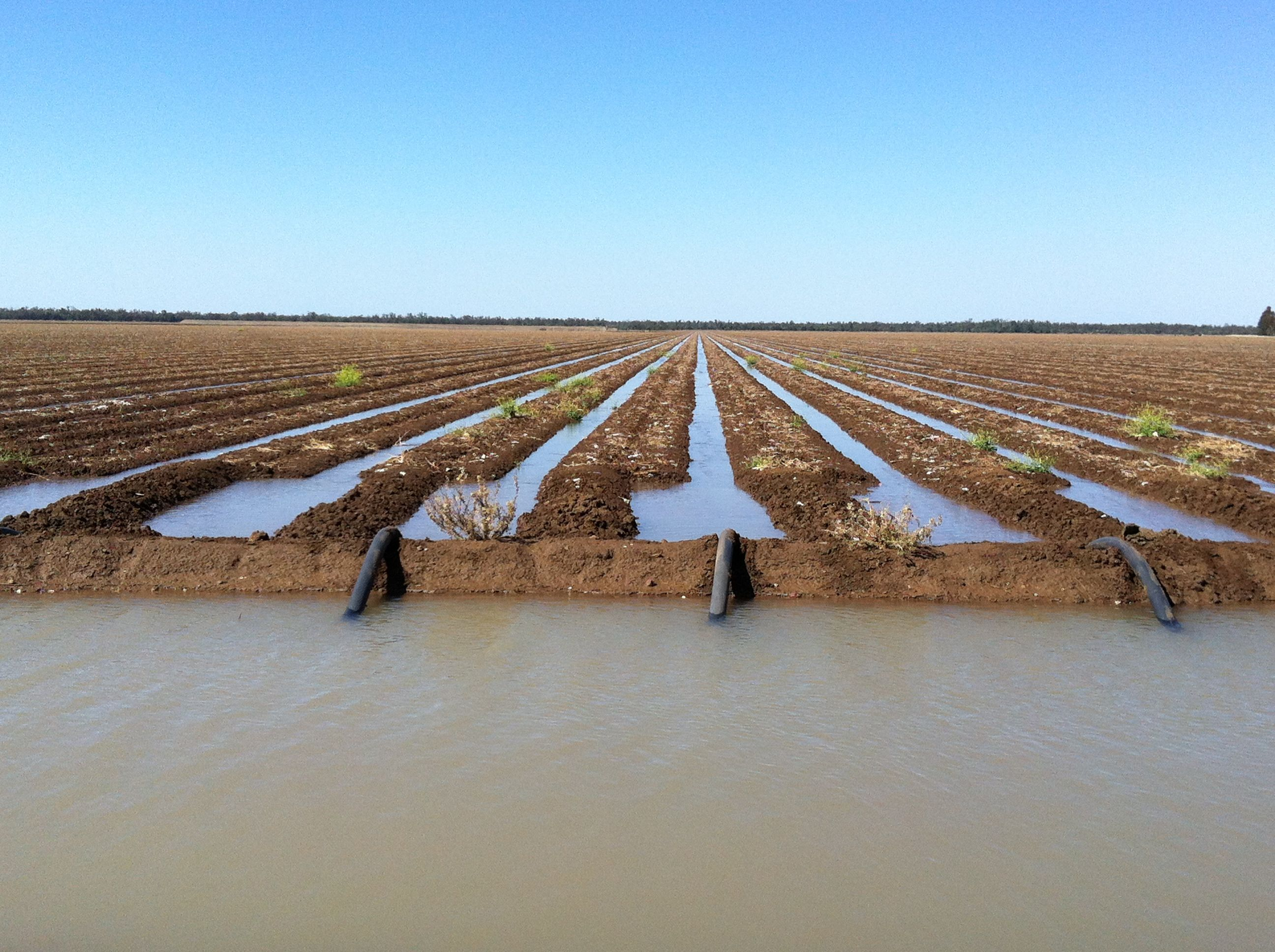
Siphon irrigation of cotton near St George, Queensland

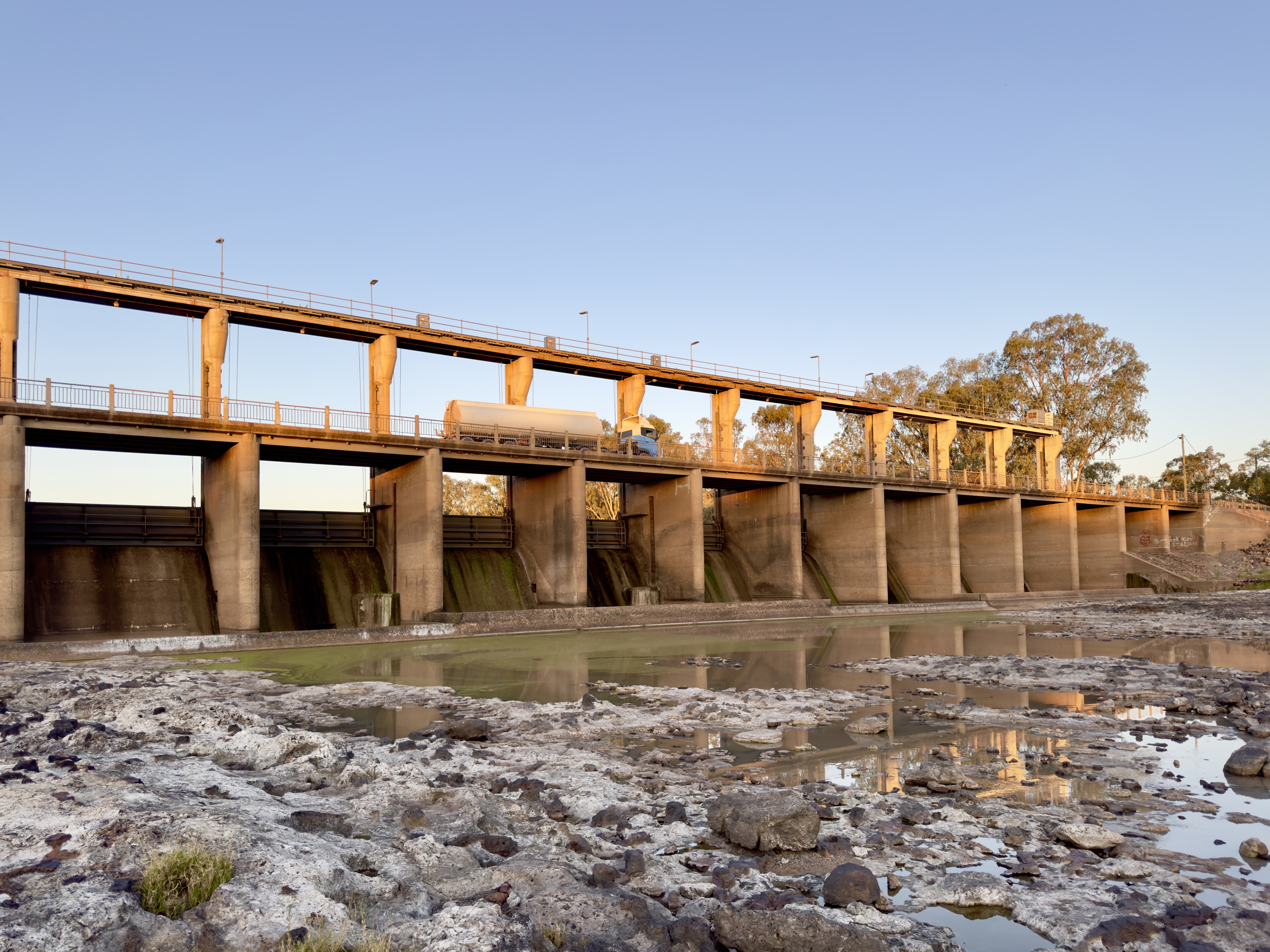
Jack Taylor Weir viewed from downstream side at St George, Queensland

== See also ==
- List of rivers of Australia § Queensland
- Andrew Nixon Bridge
