= Angledool =

- Town
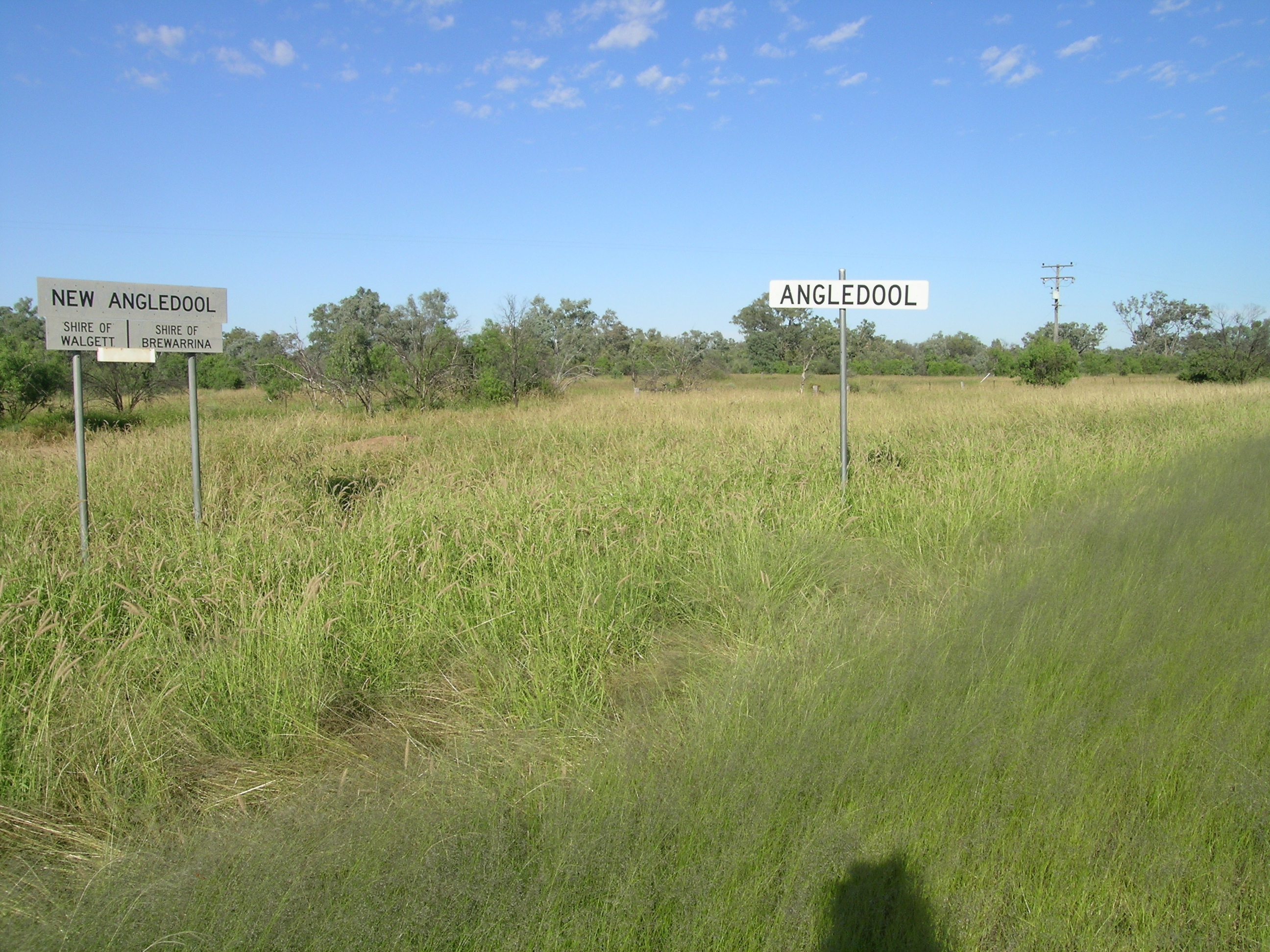
- Boundary signs at (New) Angledool, NSW.

- Coordinates: 29°06′14″S 147°55′04″E
- Country: Australia
- State: New South Wales
- LGA: Walgett Shire and Brewarrina Shires
- Location: 45 km (28 mi) N of Lightning Ridge

Government
  - State electorate: Barwon
- Elevation: 150 m (490 ft)

Population
  - Total: 34 (2021 census)
- County: Narran

Angledool is a locality in upper western New South Wales near the southern border of Queensland, one kilometre east of the Castlereagh Highway and approximately 45 kilometres north of Lightning Ridge. At the 2021 census, Angledool had a population of 34 people.

== History ==
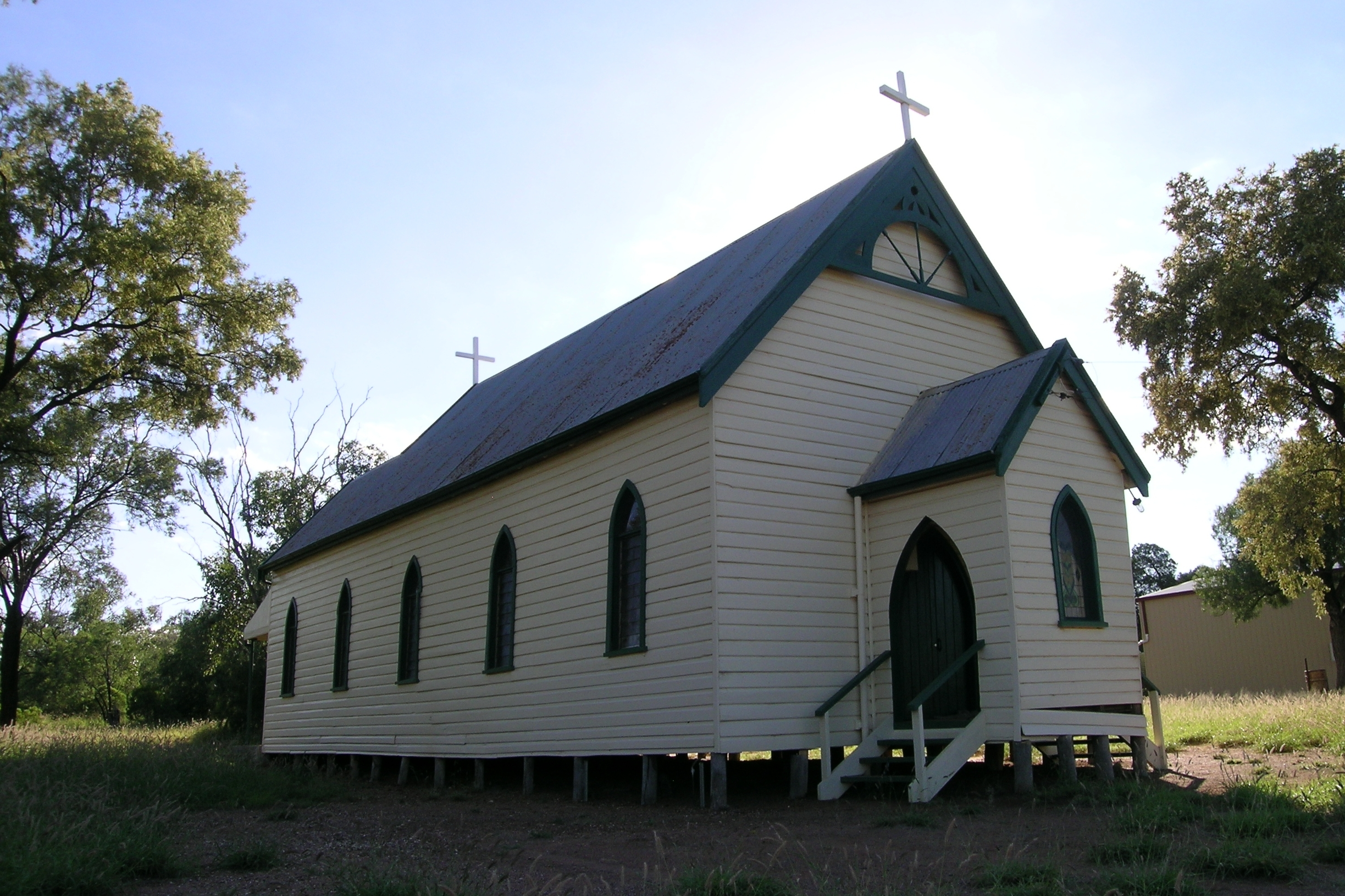
A church at Angledool, NSW.

Yuwaalaraay (also known as Yuwalyai, Euahlayi, Yuwaaliyaay, Gamilaraay, Kamilaroi, Yuwaaliyaayi) is an Australian Aboriginal language spoken on Yuwaalaraay country. The Yuwaalaraay language region includes the landscape within the local government boundaries of the Shire of Balonne, including the town of Dirranbandi as well as the border town of Hebel extending to Walgett and Collarenebri in New South Wales.

Angledool was previously known as New Angledool when it was established in the 1870s.

In 1873 Robert Moore, the manager of the pastoral property, Muggarie Station, later known as Angledool Station, discovered opals.

The nearby Narran River has led to flooding of the Angledool area in 1890, 1956, 1990, 1996 and again in March 2010. The 1956 flood was the biggest one that has been recorded. In March 2010 the Narran River at Angledool flooded the nearby Angledool Lake, which covers an area of around 1,100 hectares when full. The lake then spilled into Weetalabah Creek that crosses the Castlereagh Highway, thus filling the Coocoran Lake, near Lightning Ridge.

Prior to World War II Angledool had a bakery, several hotels, a post office, court house and a general store. The village now has an old cemetery, a church, a few houses and several buildings that are over 120 years old. The town hall made from locally made mud bricks is a classic example of early local architecture.
