= Weir River (Queensland) =

Weir
- Location of Weir River mouth on the Queensland-New South Wales border

Location
- Country: Australia
- State: Queensland
- Region: Darling Downs

Physical characteristics
- Source: Great Dividing Range
  - location: southwest of Cecil Plains
  - coordinates: 27°36′26″S 151°01′10″E
  - elevation: 358 m (1,175 ft)
- Mouth: Barwon River
  - location: northeast of Mungindi
  - coordinates: 28°49′57″S 149°06′04″E
  - elevation: 166 m (545 ft)
- Length: 470 km (290 mi)

Basin features
- River system: Barwon River catchment, Murray–Darling basin
- Waterhole: Wanda Wanda Waterhole

The Weir River, a river that is part of the Border Rivers group and also forms part of the Barwon River catchment in the Murray–Darling basin, is located in the Darling Downs region of Queensland, Australia.

== Location and features ==
The headwaters of the river rise on the western slopes of the Great Dividing Range in the Dunmore State forest and flows in a south westerly direction. The river continues through the Booroondoo State Forest then crosses the Leichhardt Highway, flows past Currajong and Goodar and then veers west. It continues running almost parallel with the Barwon Highway near Bungunya then later veers south west, again crossing the highway just east of Talwood. It flows through the Wanda Wanda Waterhole then continues south west until discharging into the Barwon River northeast of Mungindi on the border between Queensland and New South Wales. The river descends 192 metres (630 ft) over its 470-kilometre (290 mi) course.

The Weir, Macintyre, Dumaresq and the Queensland branch of the Severn and the New South Wales branch of the Severn rivers are known as the Border Rivers that straddle the Queensland and New South Wales border and feed into the Murray-Darling Basin. The rivers have a combined catchment area of 44,600 square kilometres (17,220 sq mi).

== See also ==
- List of rivers of Australia § Queensland
