= Narran River =

River in Queensland and New South Wales Australia

Coordinates: 28°59′57″S 147°48′12″E

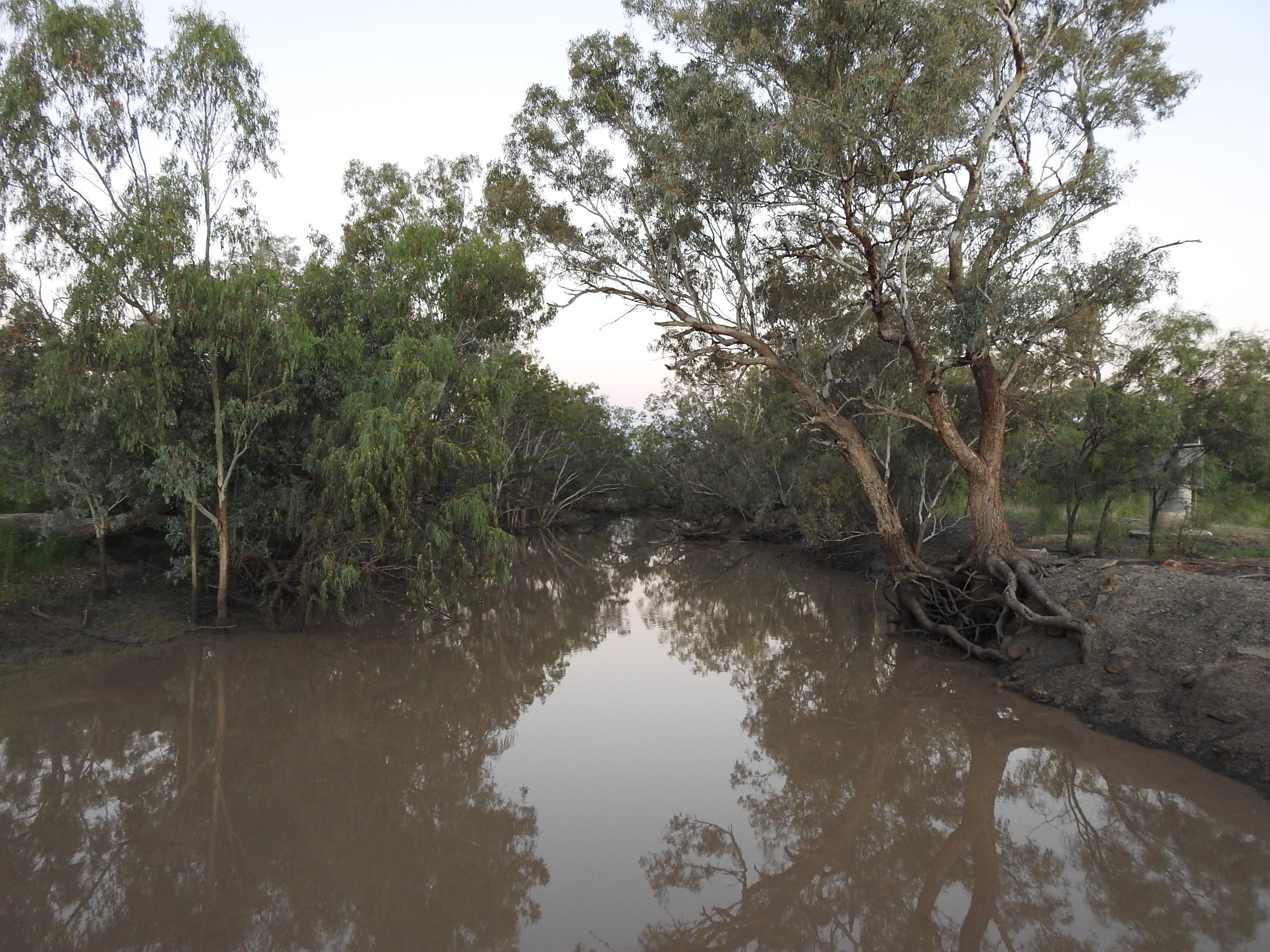
- Narran River before Minnum Road, Dirranbandi, Balonne region, Queensland, Australia (2021)

Location
- Country: Australia
- State: Queensland, New South Wales
- Region: IBRA: Brigalow Belt South
- District: Southern Downs, Orana
- Municipalities: Balonne, Walgett, Brewarrina

Physical characteristics
- Source: A branch of the Balonne River
  - location: near Dirranbandi, Queensland
  - elevation: 179 m (587 ft)
- Mouth: Narran Lake
  - location: near Brewarrina, New South Wales
  - elevation: 118 m (387 ft)
- Length: 299 km (186 mi)

Basin features
- River system: Barwon River, Murray–Darling basin
- Reservoir: Narran Lake

Narran River, a watercourse of the Barwon catchment within the Murray–Darling basin, is located in the Southern Downs district of Queensland and Orana district of New South Wales, Australia.

The river rises south west of Dirranbandi, as a branch of the Balonne River in Queensland, and flows generally to the south and south-west, before reaching its mouth at Narran Lake, between Brewarrina and Walgett in New South Wales, descending 61 metres (200 ft) over its 299 kilometres (186 mi) course.

In March 2010 the Narran River flooded the Angledool Lake at Angledool and then spilled into Weetalabah Creek, crossing the Castlereagh Highway, filling Coocoran Lake near Lightning Ridge.

== See also ==
- Rivers of Queensland
- Rivers of New South Wales
- List of rivers of Australia
