= Barwon River (New South Wales) =

Barwon Upper Darling River
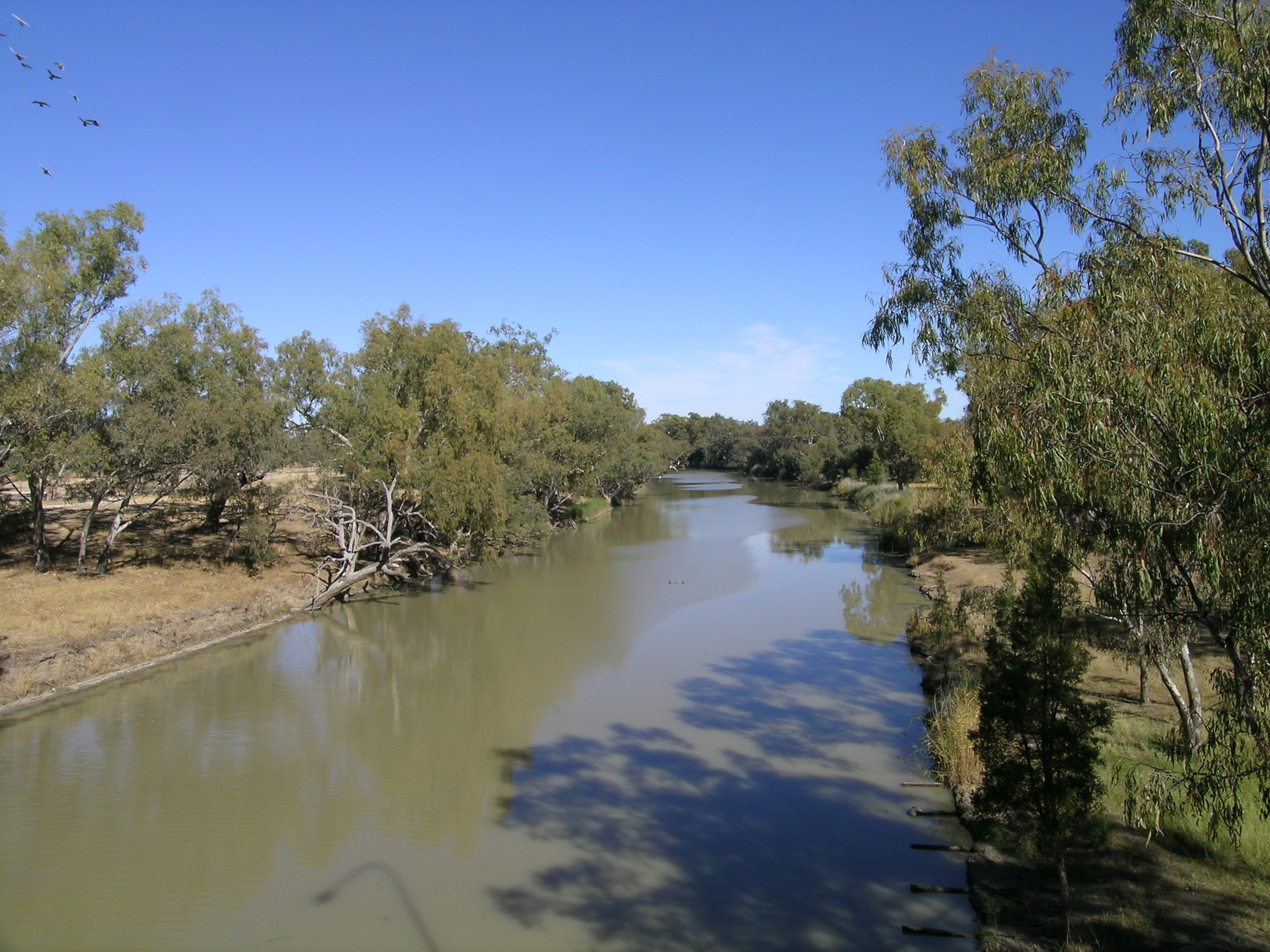
- Barwon River at Collarenebri

- Location of Barwon River mouth in New South Wales
- Etymology: Aboriginal: from barwum or bawon, meaning great, wide, awful river of muddy water

Location
- Country: Australia
- States: Queensland, New South Wales
- Region: South West Queensland, North West Slopes, Orana
- Towns: Mungindi, Collarenebri, Brewarrina,

Physical characteristics
- Source: Macintyre River
  - location: north of Mungindi, Southern Downs, Queensland
  - elevation: 196 m (643 ft)
- 2nd source: Weir River
- Mouth: confluence with the Culgoa River to form the Darling River
  - location: east of Bourke, Orana region
  - coordinates: 29°57′29″S 146°18′28″E
  - elevation: 110 m (360 ft)
- Length: 700 km (430 mi)

Basin features
- River system: Murray–Darling basin
- Tributaries
  - left: Gwydir River, Mehi River, Namoi River, Macquarie River, Bogan River
  - right: Boomi River, Moonie River, Bokhara River

Barwon River, a perennial river that is part of the Murray–Darling basin, is located in the north-west slopes and Orana regions of New South Wales, Australia.

The name "barwon" is derived from the Australian Aboriginal words of barwum or bawon, meaning great, wide, awful river of muddy water; and also baawan, a Ngiyambaa name for both the Barwon and Darling rivers. The history, culture and livelihoods of the local Aboriginal people are closely intertwined with the Barwon River and its associated tributaries and downstream flows.

== Course ==
The river is formed through the confluence of the Macintyre River and Weir River (part of the Border Rivers system), north of Mungindi, in the Southern Downs region of Queensland. The Barwon River generally flows south and west, joined by 36 tributaries, including major inflows from the Boomi, Moonie, Gwydir, Mehi, Namoi, Macquarie, Bokhara and Bogan rivers. During major flooding, overflow from the Narran Lakes and the Narran River also flows into the Barwon. The confluence of the Barwon and Culgoa rivers, between Brewarrina and Bourke, marks the start of the Darling River.

From its head to the point where it reaches the 29th parallel south near the town of Mungindi, the course of the Barwon is the border between Queensland and New South Wales.

Towns on the Barwon River, from its source towards its mouth include Mungindi, Collarenebri, Walgett, and Brewarrina.

The catchment and water flows of the Barwon River are generally administered by the Murray–Darling Basin Authority and together with the Darling River, the catchment covers about 13% of the Murray-Darling Basin.

In December 2018, amidst drought, the Barwon River at Walgett ceased flowing, reduced to a series of stagnant pools.

== History ==
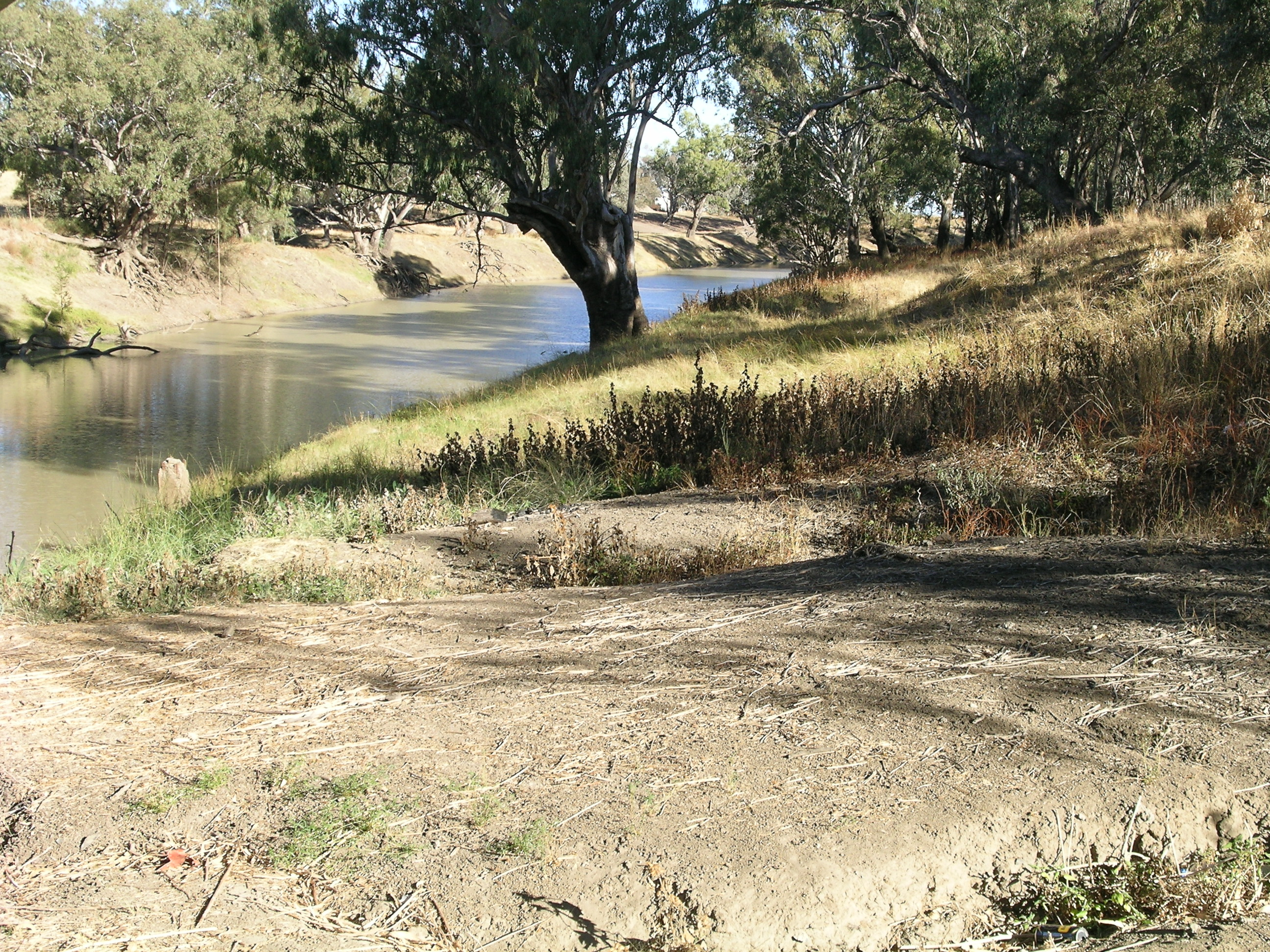
Barwon River near Walgett

=== Aboriginal history ===
Aboriginal people from six language groups originally occupied the area of the Barwon River wetlands. These were the Ngemba, the Baranbinja, the Murrawarri, the Yuwaalaraay, the Weilwan, and the Kamilaroi peoples. The Aboriginal people generally used the wetlands for hunting, fishing, and gathering uses, and for cultural association.

Aboriginal people built a complex series of fish traps on the Barwon River at Brewarrina. These traps are a large, well-preserved example of this type of prehistoric site. The traps were built of rocks placed in the river bed to form a large number of V-shaped or diamond-shaped channels. The Brewarrina fish traps have now been listed on the Australian National Heritage List owing to the rarity of these works. They are of importance to modern Aboriginal people and are still in use. There are rocky rapids above and below Collarenebri as well as weirs and other structures for irrigation which impede normal navigation of the river.

=== European history ===
In 1846, Roderick Mitchell, Commissioner of Crown Lands and the son of explorer, Sir Thomas Mitchell, proved that the Barwon and MacIntyre Rivers were the same river under different names.

Regular steamer services ran from Walgett to Bourke from 1880 to 1912. During the floods of 1879 and 1886 the steamers were able to travel into Collarenebri and as far as Mungindi in 1890.

The Brewarrina Bridge, which was built in 1888 over the Barwon River on the Kamilaroi Highway, has also been assessed as being of state significance. The Boonanga bridge completed in 1928 to cross the Barwon River near Boomi, is an early example of Allan timber truss road bridges. This bridge has been recorded with the NSW State Agency Heritage Register.

== See also ==
- List of rivers of Australia § New South Wales
- Mungindi Bridge
