= Narran Wetlands =

Wetland in New South Wales, Australia

Narran Lake Nature Reserve
- IUCN category Ia (strict nature reserve)
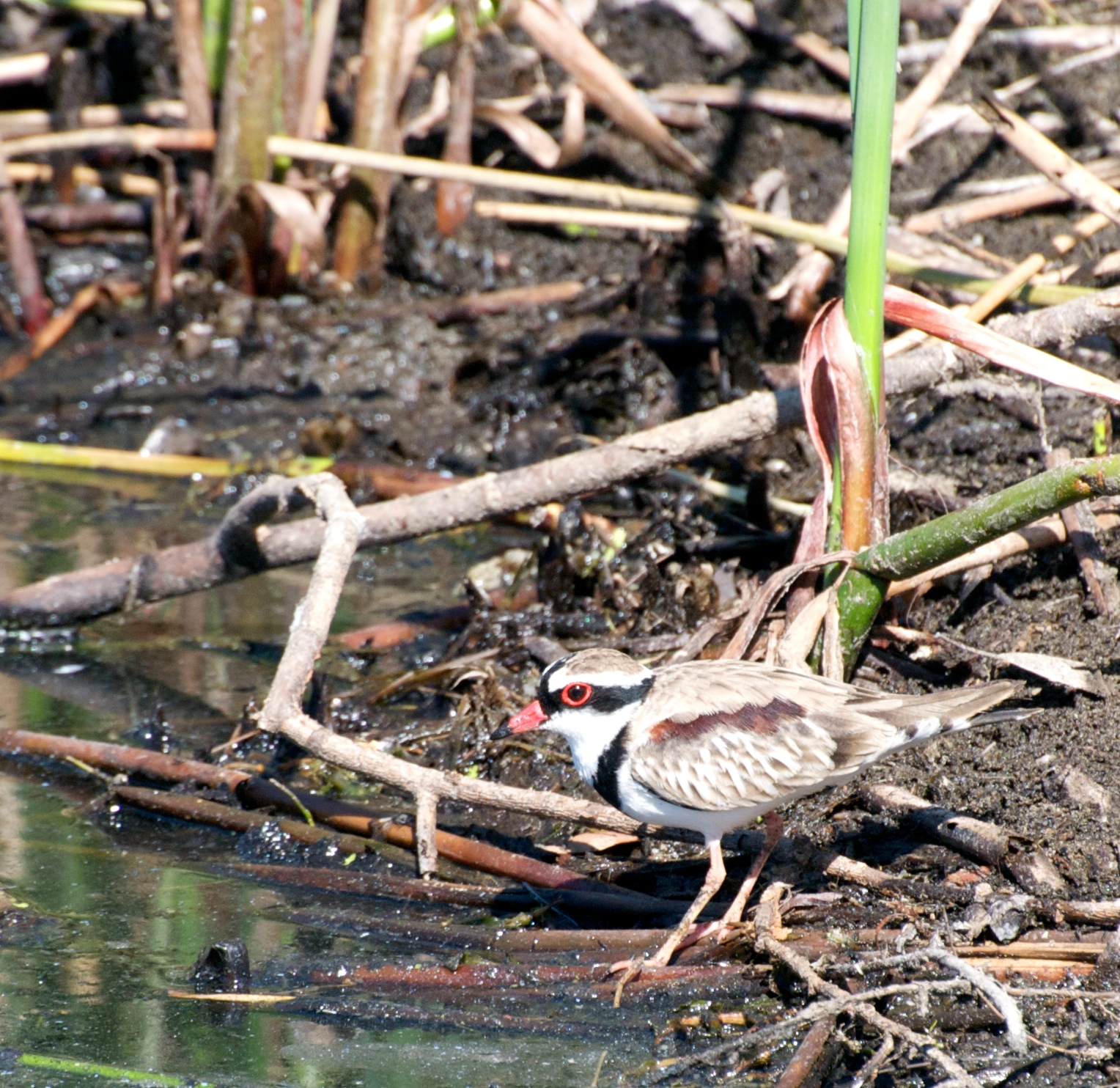
- The wetlands are important for black-fronted dotterels

- Location within New South Wales
- Location: New South Wales
- Nearest city: Brewarrina
- Coordinates: 29°47′42″S 147°23′22″E
- Area: 264.8 km^{2} (102.2 sq mi)
- Established: October 1988
- Visitors: Closed to the public
- Governing body: NSW National Parks & Wildlife Service
- Website: Official website

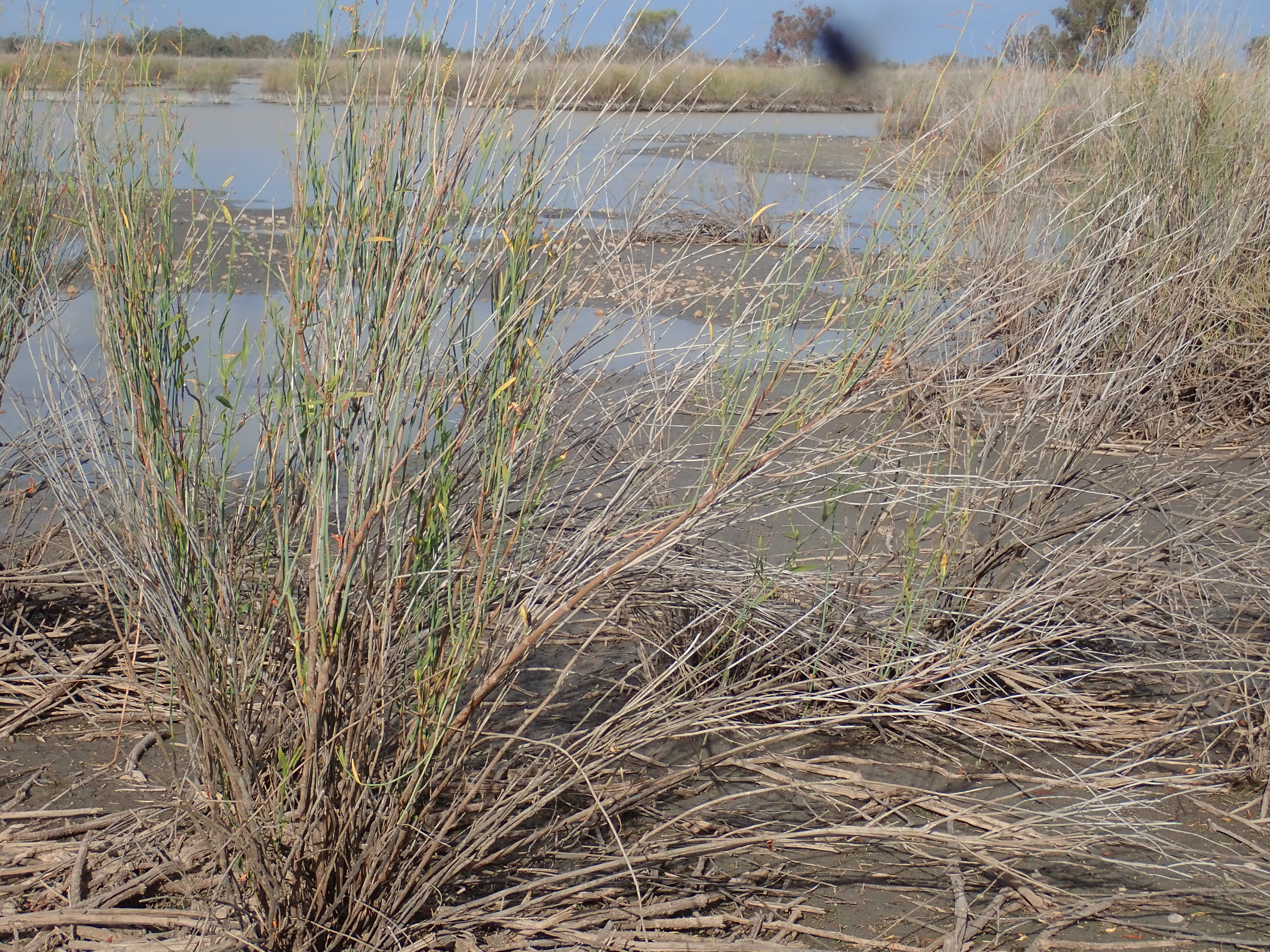
Lignum swamp, Narran Lake nature reserve

The Narran Wetlands, also known as the Narran Lakes, contained within the Narran Lake Nature Reserve, comprise a series of protected ephemeral lakes and swamps fed by the Narran River in the north-west of New South Wales, Australia. The 26,480-hectare (65,400-acre) reserve is approximately 50 kilometres (31 mi) east of Brewarrina.

An 8,447-hectare (20,870-acre) area contained within the reserve is protected under the Ramsar Convention as a wetland of international importance. It is internationally important because of its rarity and naturalness; its significance for waterbirds, supporting large colonial waterbird breeding events of ibis, spoonbills and cormorants; and its importance as a drought refuge for waterbirds. The vegetation and the waterbird colonies are at risk from reduced flooding caused by upstream water abstraction for agriculture in Queensland.

== Description ==
The wetland complex formed by the Narran floodplain is the terminal system of the Narran River, the easternmost distributary of the Balonne River, and lies between the towns of Brewarrina and Walgett, in the Murray-Darling Basin. The floodplain contains three areas of open water, Clear Lake and Back Lake (with Long Arm) in the north, and Narran Lake (also known as Terewah) in the south, connected by expanses of vegetation subject to flooding. The wetland supports extensive and dense stands of lignum with, in places, an overstorey of river red gums or belalie. The vegetation constitutes the substrate on which the waterbird breeding colonies depend and which require regular flooding for their survival. The average annual rainfall is 495 millimetres (19.5 in). The surrounding region is part of the semi-arid pastoral zone used mainly for grazing cattle and sheep.

== Birds ==
The wetlands have been identified by BirdLife International as an Important Bird Area because they support large numbers of nesting waterbirds when flooded. Birds include the largest colony of straw-necked ibises (with up to 200,000 pairs), over 1% of the world populations of Australian pelicans and black-fronted dotterels, and small numbers of endangered Australasian bitterns. Other birds which have been recorded in relatively large numbers include pied, little black and great cormorants, freckled and pink-eared ducks, black swans, glossy ibises, whiskered terns, royal spoonbills and darters.

== History ==
Yuwaalayaay (also known as Uallaroi, Yuwalyai, Euahlayi, Yuwaaliyaay, Gamilaraay, Kamilaroi, Yuwaaliyaayi) is an Australian Aboriginal language spoken on Yuwaalaraay country. It is closely related to the Gamilaraay and Yuwaalaraay languages. The Yuwaalayaay language region includes the landscape within the local government boundaries of the Shire of Balonne, including the town of Dirranbandi as well as the border town of Goodooga extending to Walgett and the Narran Lakes in New South Wales.

Archaeological evidence in the form of stone artefacts has dated human occupation in the region to at least 30,000 years. A flat grindstone embedded with plant tissue was used to grind bulrush tubers over 28,000 years ago. Giiguradjin (the northern Narran Lake area) was once the site of large gatherings (or yuurrma-y in the Uallaroi language) of Aboriginal people. It is a place where several Dreaming Tracks converge. The lake's creation story is linked to Baayami and relates a struggle between crocodiles. While crocodiles are no longer found in the area, excavations at a paleontological site at nearby Cuddie Springs that was once a lake during the arid glacial period shows extinct giant kangaroos, the marsupial lion, the diprotodon (giant wombat) and at least two species of crocodiles were present.

The explorer Thomas Mitchell is the first known European to visit the Narran Lakes area in 1846. He was guided through the area by local Aboriginal people, and recorded following "well-beaten paths of the natives" as well as "pure water in great abundance" and "most excellent grass". Mitchell recorded that Indigenous people made a paste or bread out of harvested seeds of the Panicum laevinode grasses.

== See also ==
- Protected areas of New South Wales
- Wetlands in New South Wales
