= Goodooga, New South Wales =

Town in New South Wales, Australia

Goodooga New South Wales
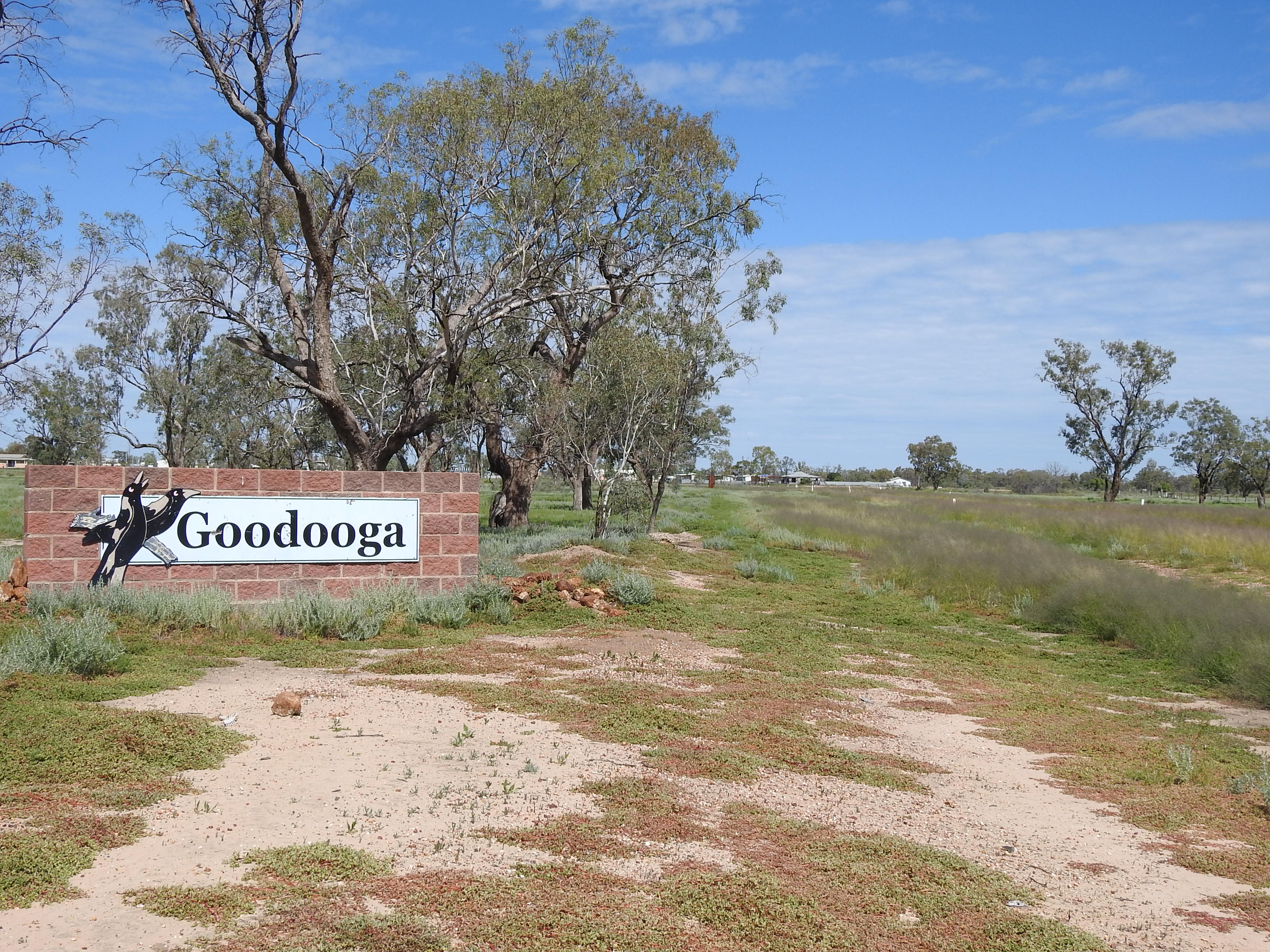
- Town sign from northern approach (2021).

- Coordinates: 29°06′0″S 147°28′0″E
- Population: 247 (2016 census)
- Postcode(s): 2838
- Elevation: 140 m (459 ft)
- Location: 784 km (487 mi) NW of Sydney; 714 km (444 mi) SW of Brisbane; 282 km (175 mi) W of Moree; 73 km (45 mi) NW of Lightning Ridge; 40 km (25 mi) SW of Hebel, Qld
- LGA(s): Brewarrina Shire
- County: Narran
- State electorate(s): Barwon
- Federal division(s): Parkes
Mean max temp	Mean min temp	Annual rainfall
27.6 °C; 82 °F	13.5 °C; 56 °F	418.4 mm 16.5 in
Localities around Goodooga:
Culgoa National Park	Hebel (Qld)	Hebel (Qld)
Wellmoringle	Goodooga	Lightning Ridge
Brewarrina	Narran Lake	Cumborah

Goodooga is a town in the Australian state of New South Wales in Brewarrina Shire on the eastern bank of the Bokhara River. It is near Brewarrina and Lightning Ridge, its closest neighbour. The town lies 20 kilometres (12 mi) south of the Queensland border, and the border town of Hebel.

The shire council built the 'Great Artesian Baths' on the northside of town, heated water pool from the Great Artesian Basin.

The Goodooga airstrip is 8.1 kilometres (5 mi) west-north-west of the town (29°4′22.5″S 147°23′16″E).

== History ==
Yuwaalayaay (also known as Yuwalyai, Euahlayi, Yuwaaliyaay, Gamilaraay, Kamilaroi, Yuwaaliyaayi) is an Australian Aboriginal language spoken on Yuwaalayaay country. It is closely related to the Gamilaraay and Yuwaalaraay languages. The Yuwaalayaay language region includes the landscape within the local government boundaries of the Shire of Balonne, including the town of Dirranbandi as well as the border town of Goodooga extending to Walgett and the Narran Lakes in New South Wales.

Goodooga is an Aboriginal word meaning, according to some "yam". However it has been proposed that it derives from "guduu+ga", 'at the place of the Murray cod' [guduu], rather than "gudugaa", a species of yam.

Goodooga's newspaper is the Goodooga Flash.

== Sport ==
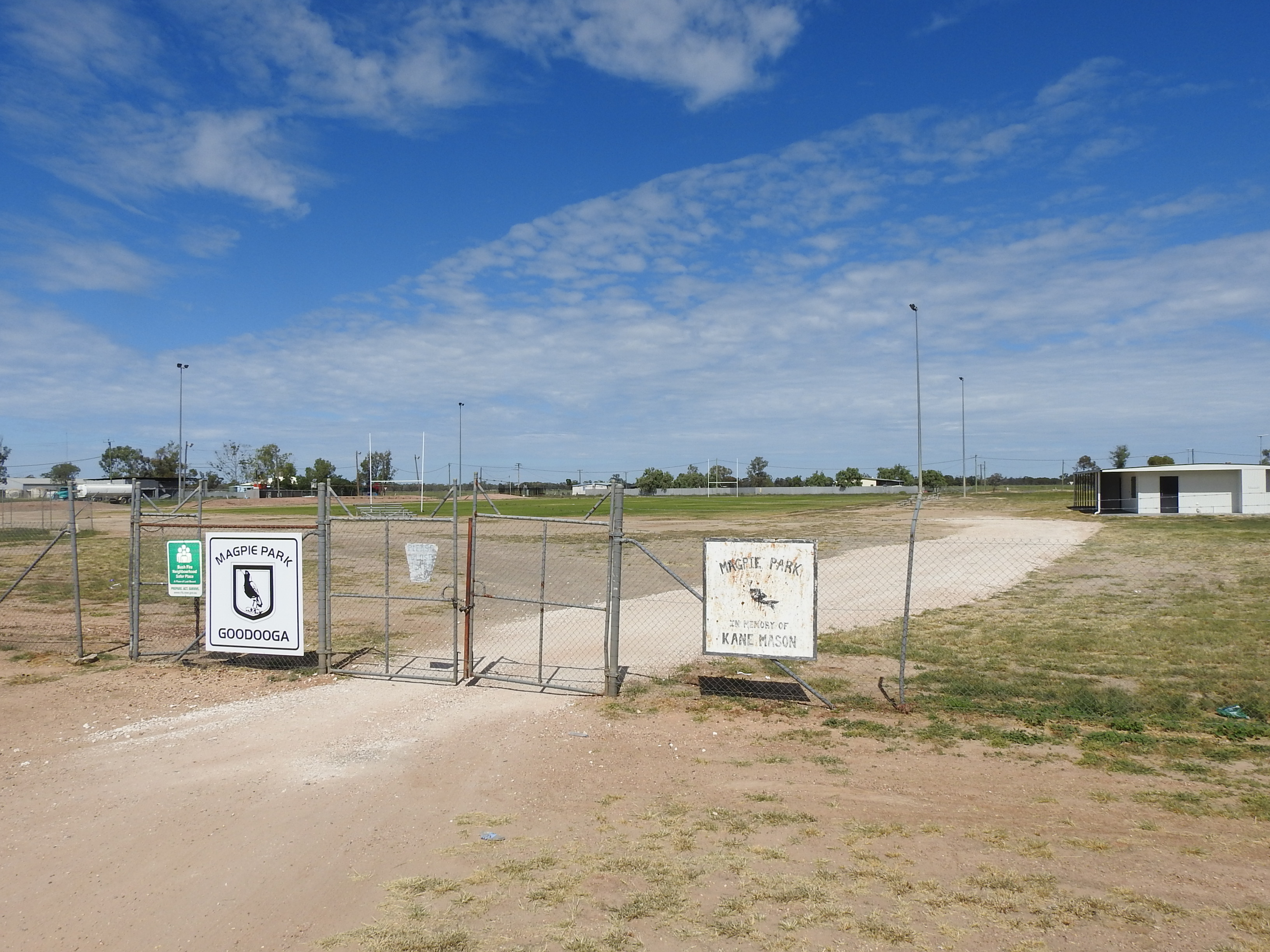
Magpie Park, Walgett Street (2021).

Goodooga's main sport is rugby league, the Goodooga Magpies or the Goodooga 'Newtown' Jets.

The other sports played in town include netball, lawn bowls and basketball.

== Population ==
According to the 2016 census of population, here were 247 people in Goodooga.

- Aboriginal and Torres Strait Islander people made up 74.4% of the population.
- 94.6% of people were born in Australia and 84.7% of people only spoke English at home.
- The most common responses for religion was Catholic at 44.7%.

== Gallery ==
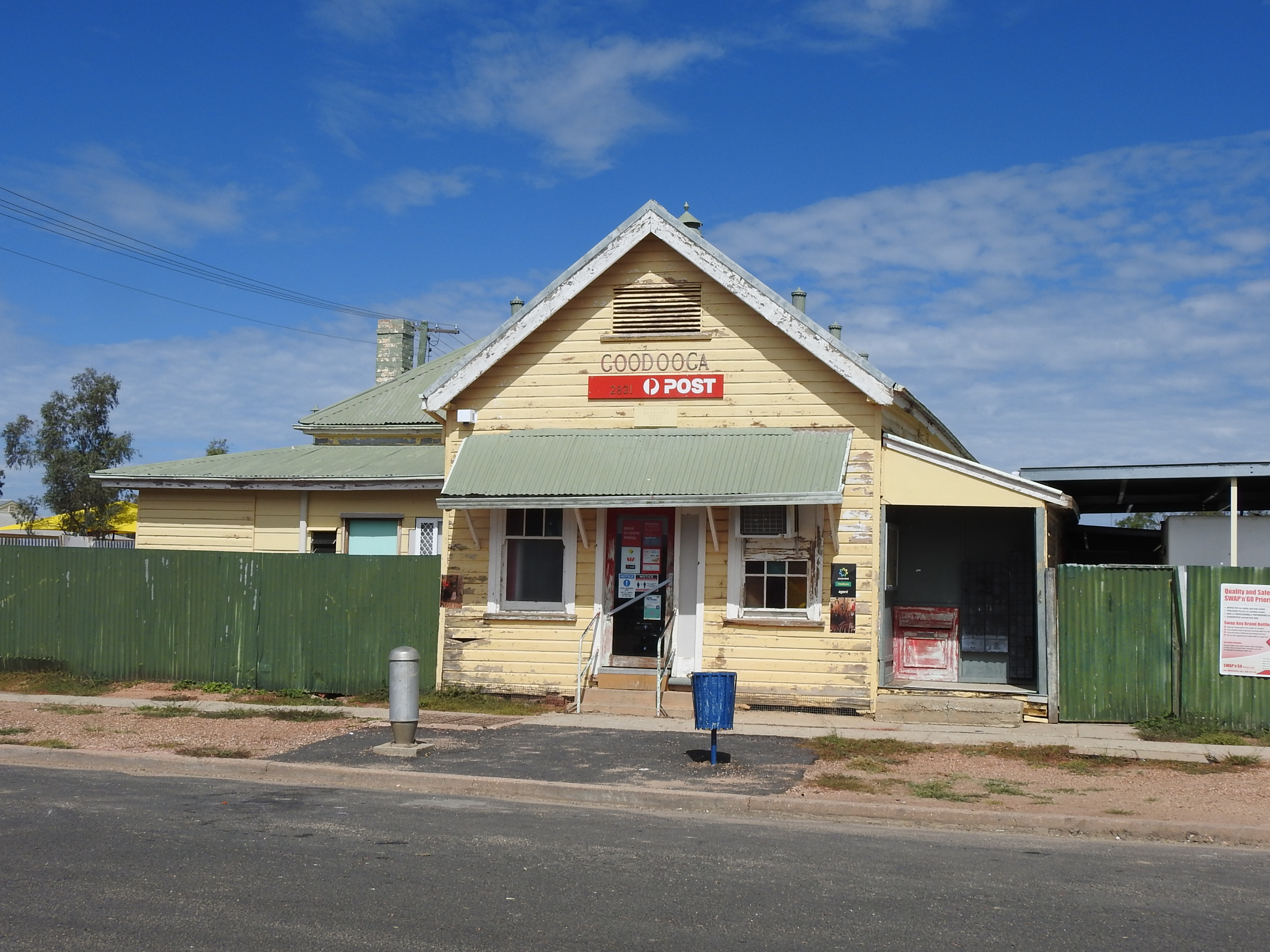
Australia Post office, Brenda Street at the intersection with Doyle Street (2021).

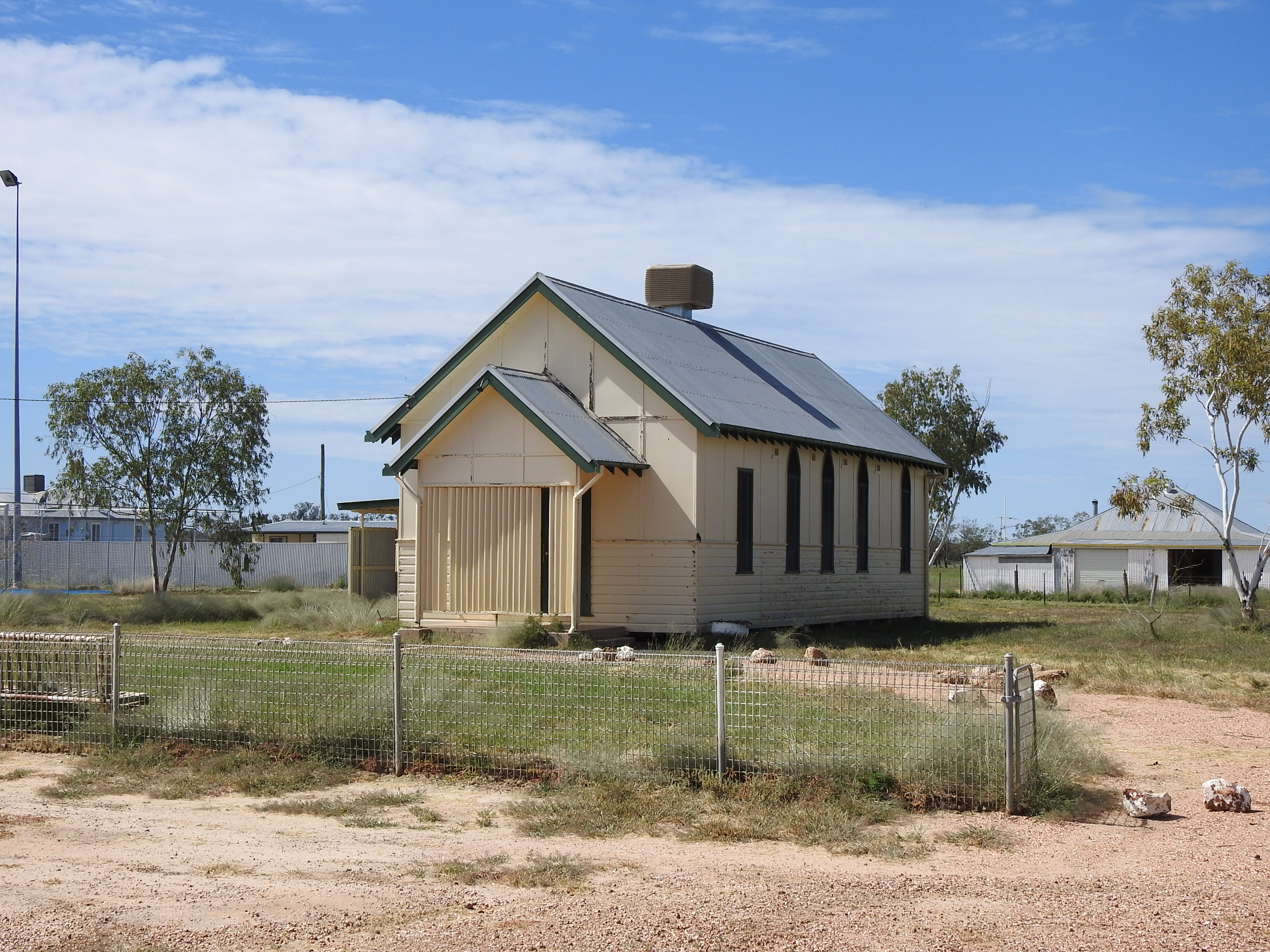
Church (2021).

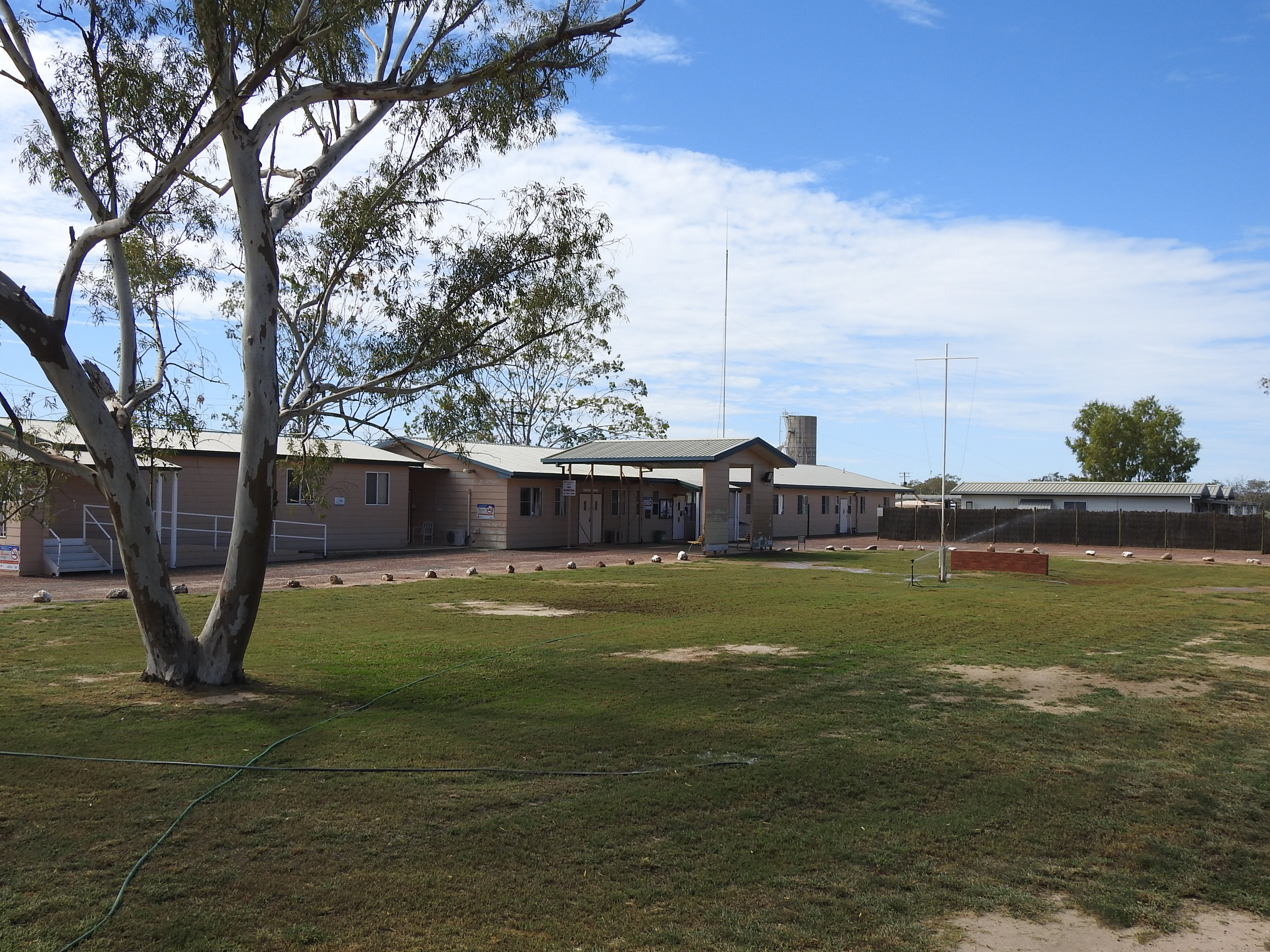
Hospital (2021).

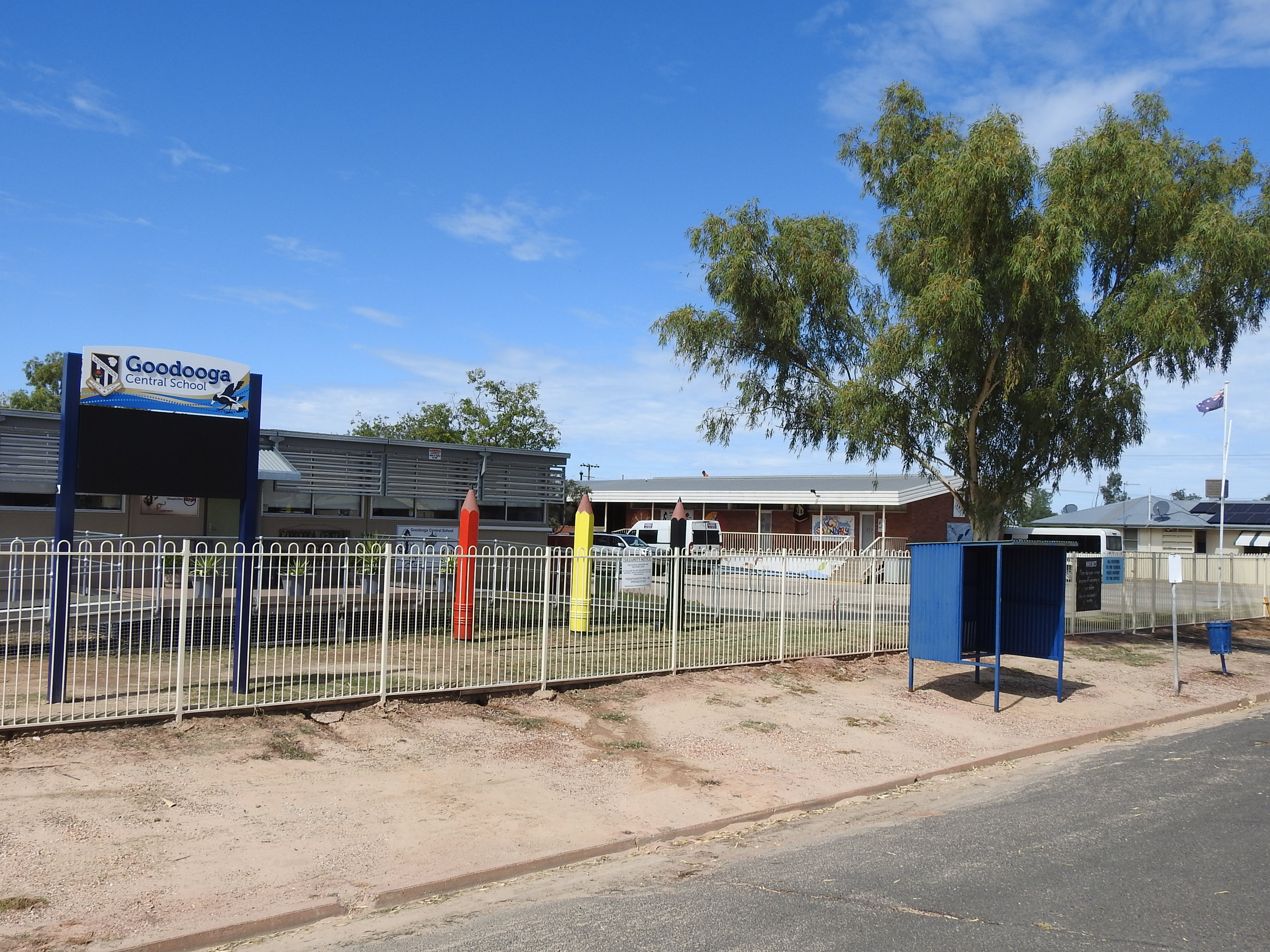
Goodooga Central School, Doyle Street (2021).

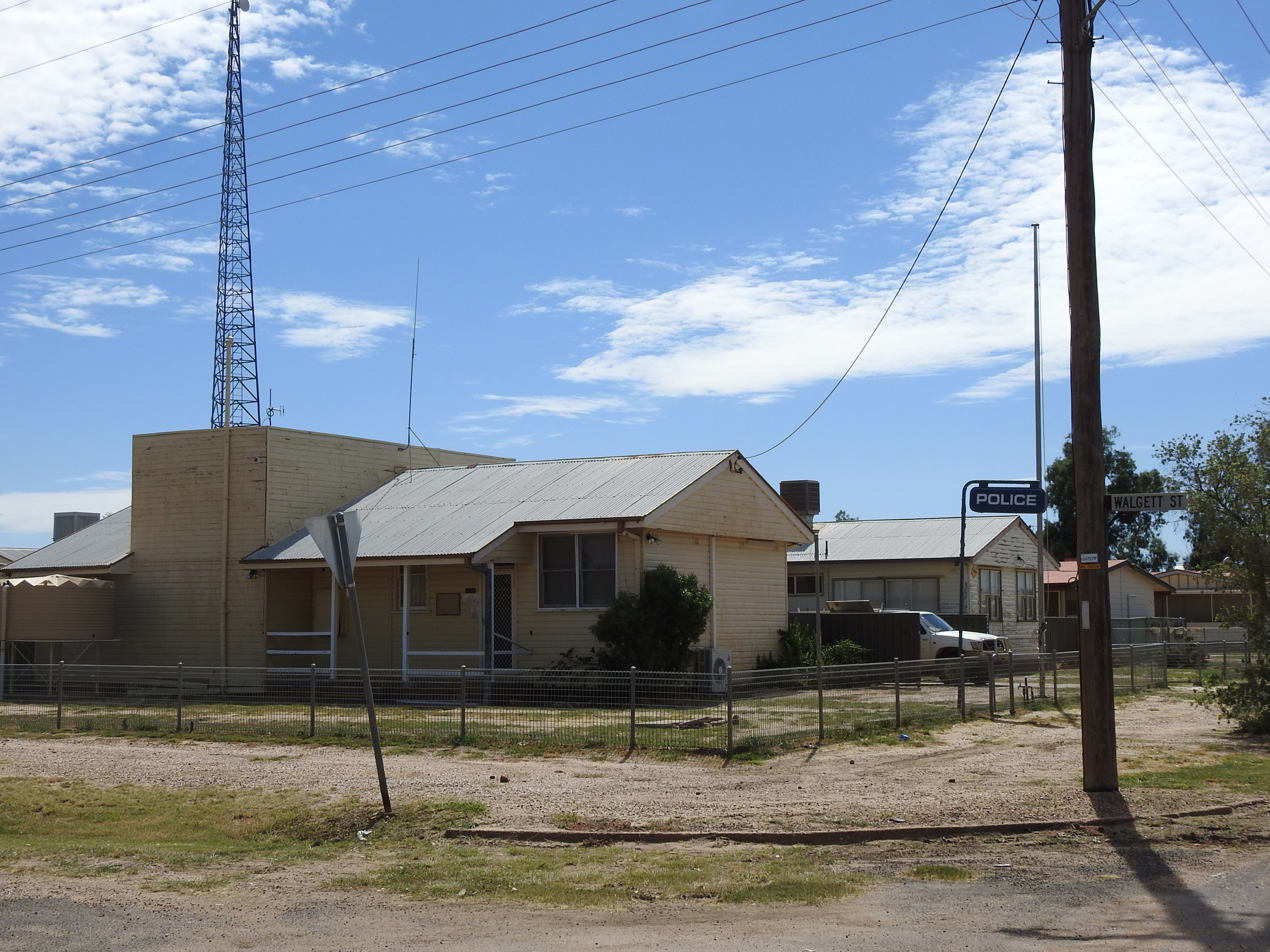
Police station (2021).

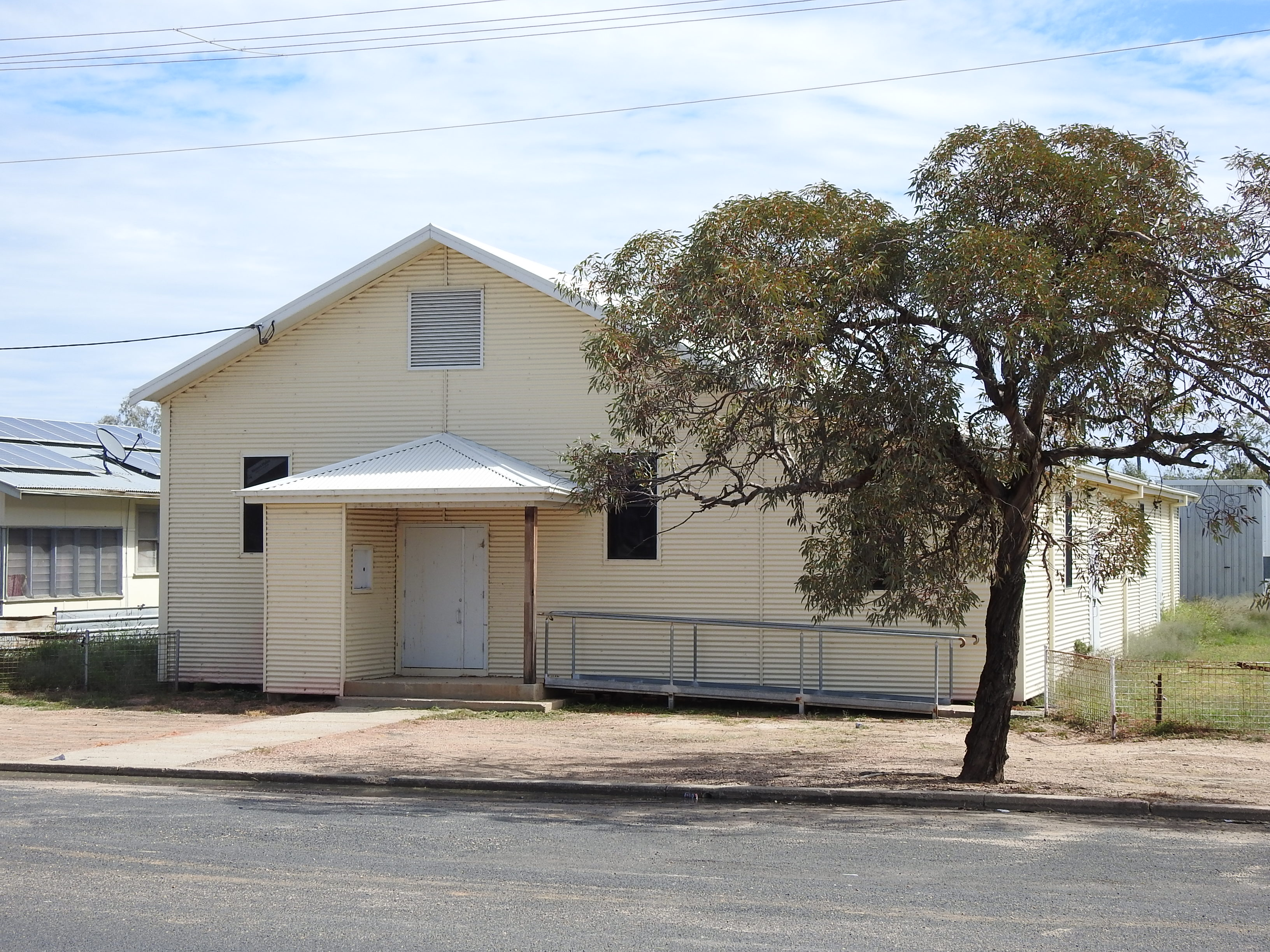
Community hall (2021).

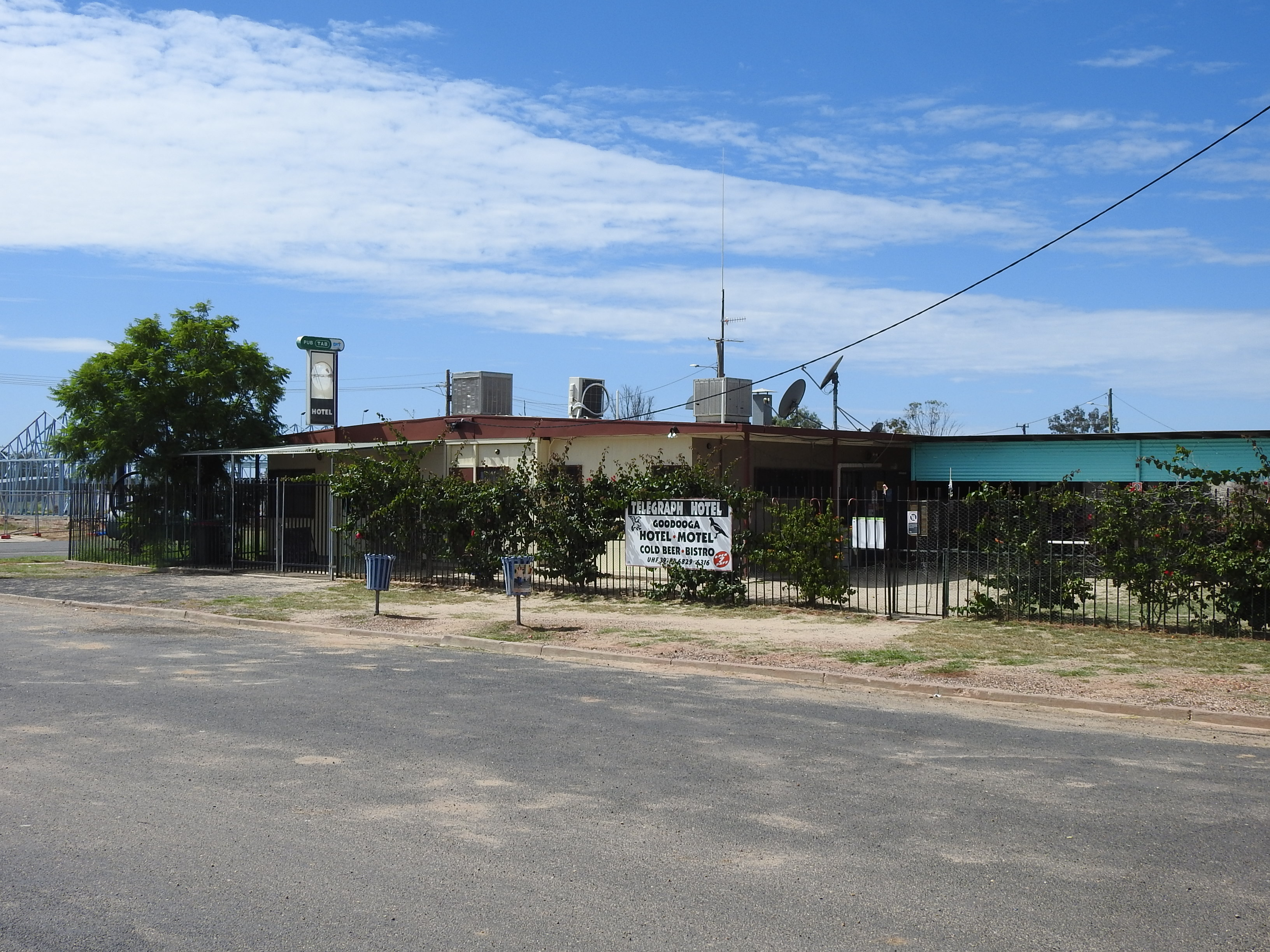
Telegraph Hotel, Adams Street (2021).

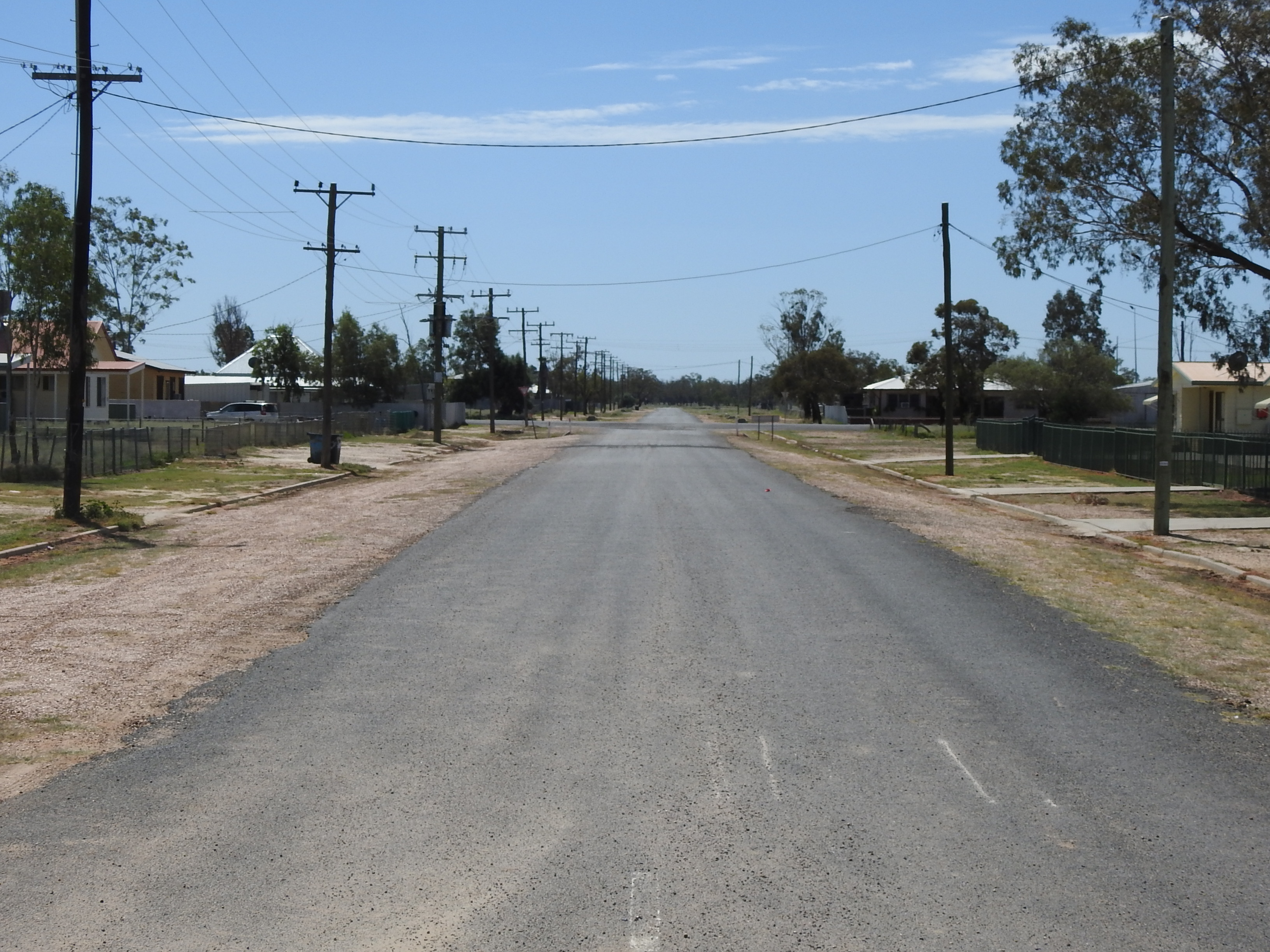
Hammond Street and housing (2021).

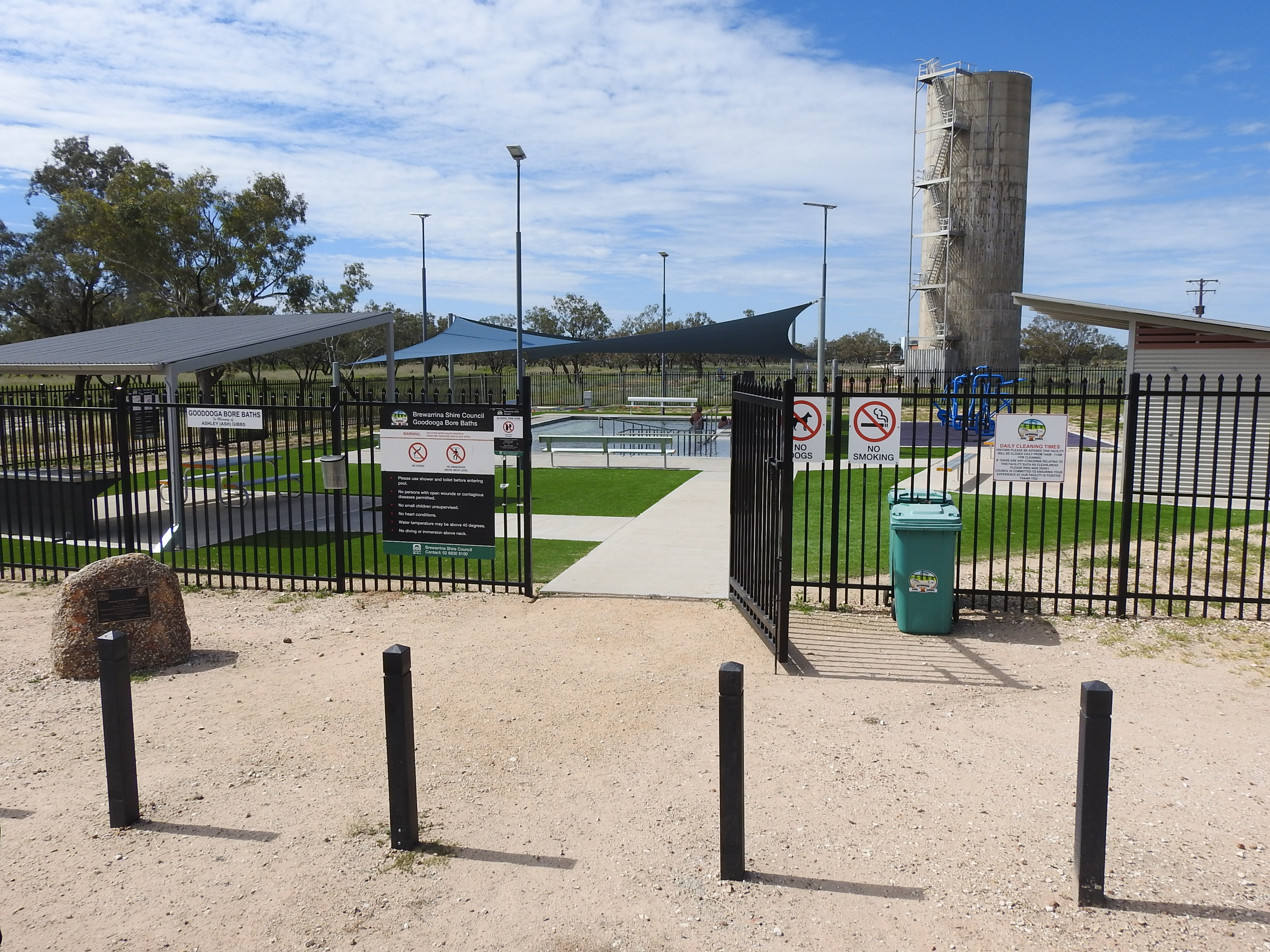
Goodooga Great Artesian Baths area and water tower (2021).

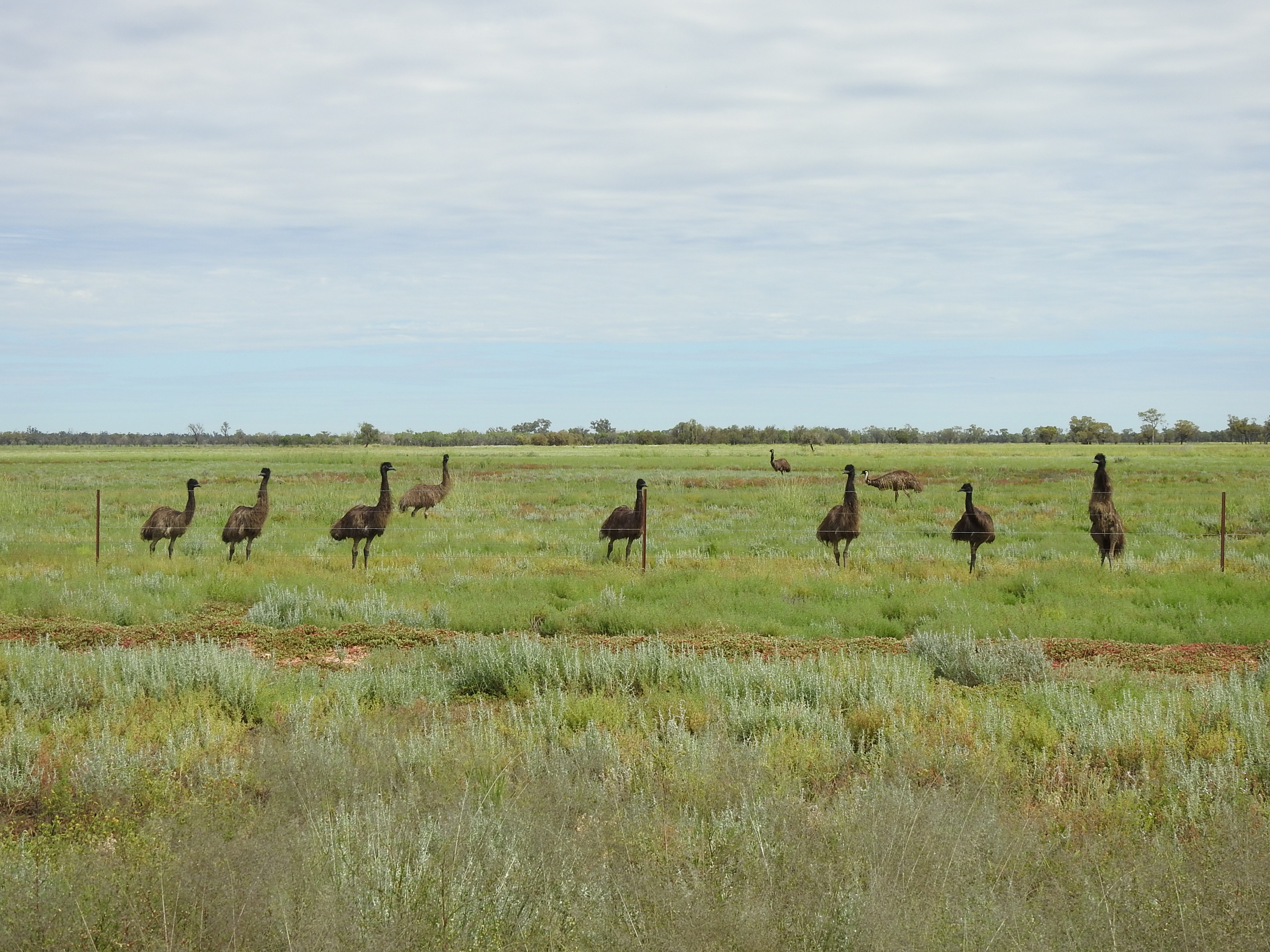
Mob of emus along the Goodooga Brenda Road (2021).

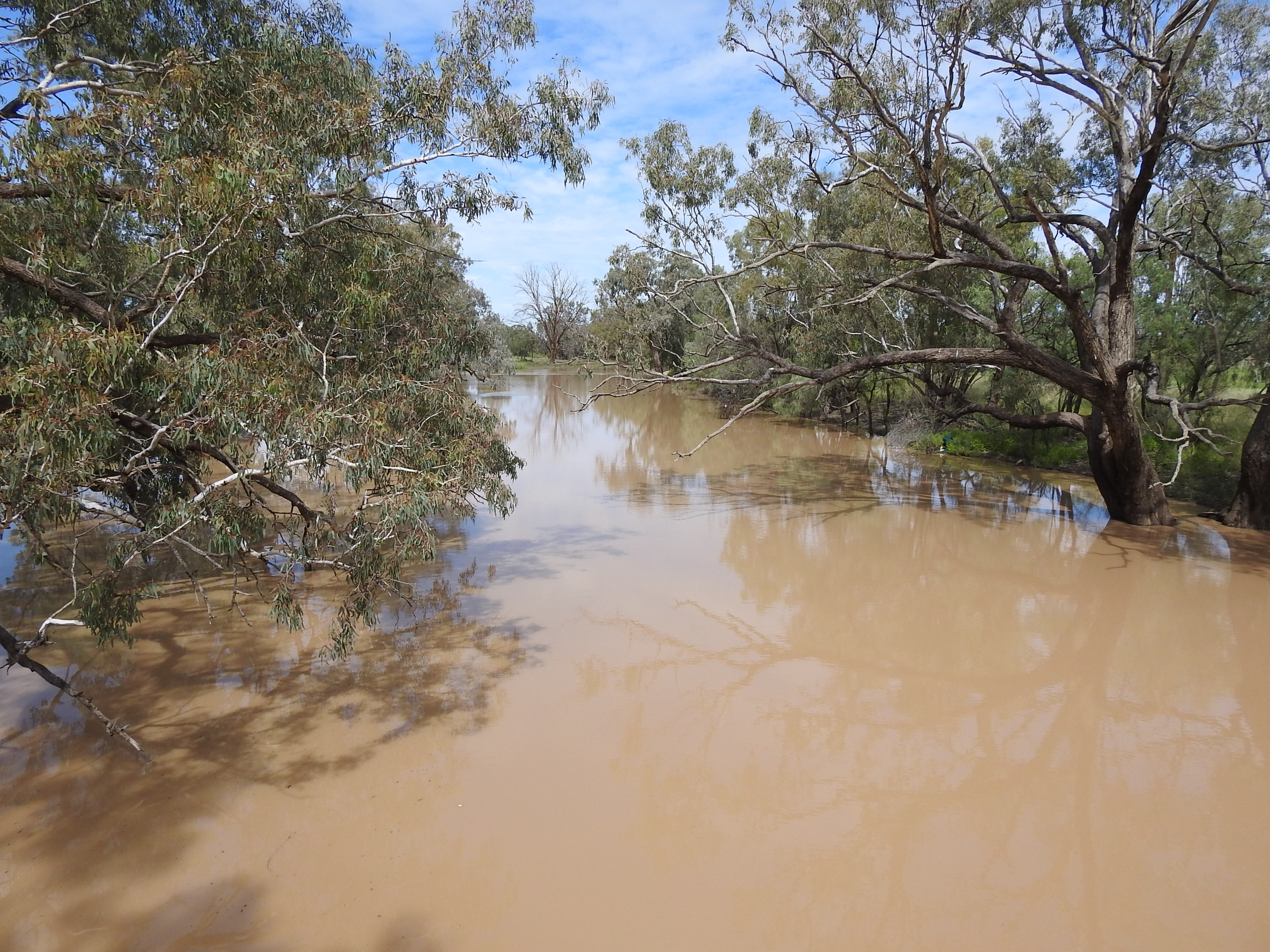
Bokhara River in flood, from the Goodooga Brenda Road bridge, west of the town (2021).

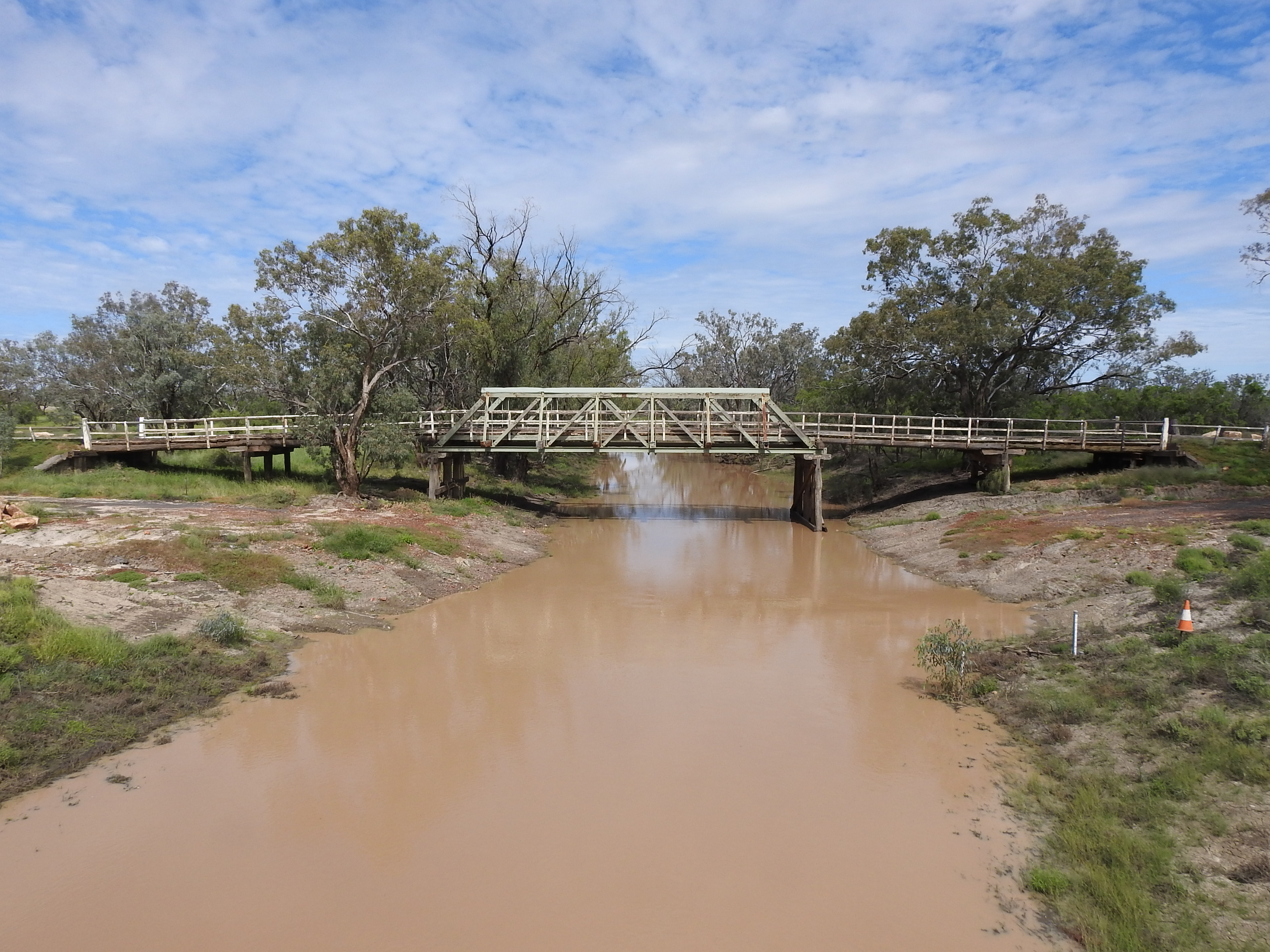
Birrie River old bridge, beside the Goodooga Brenda Road (2021).

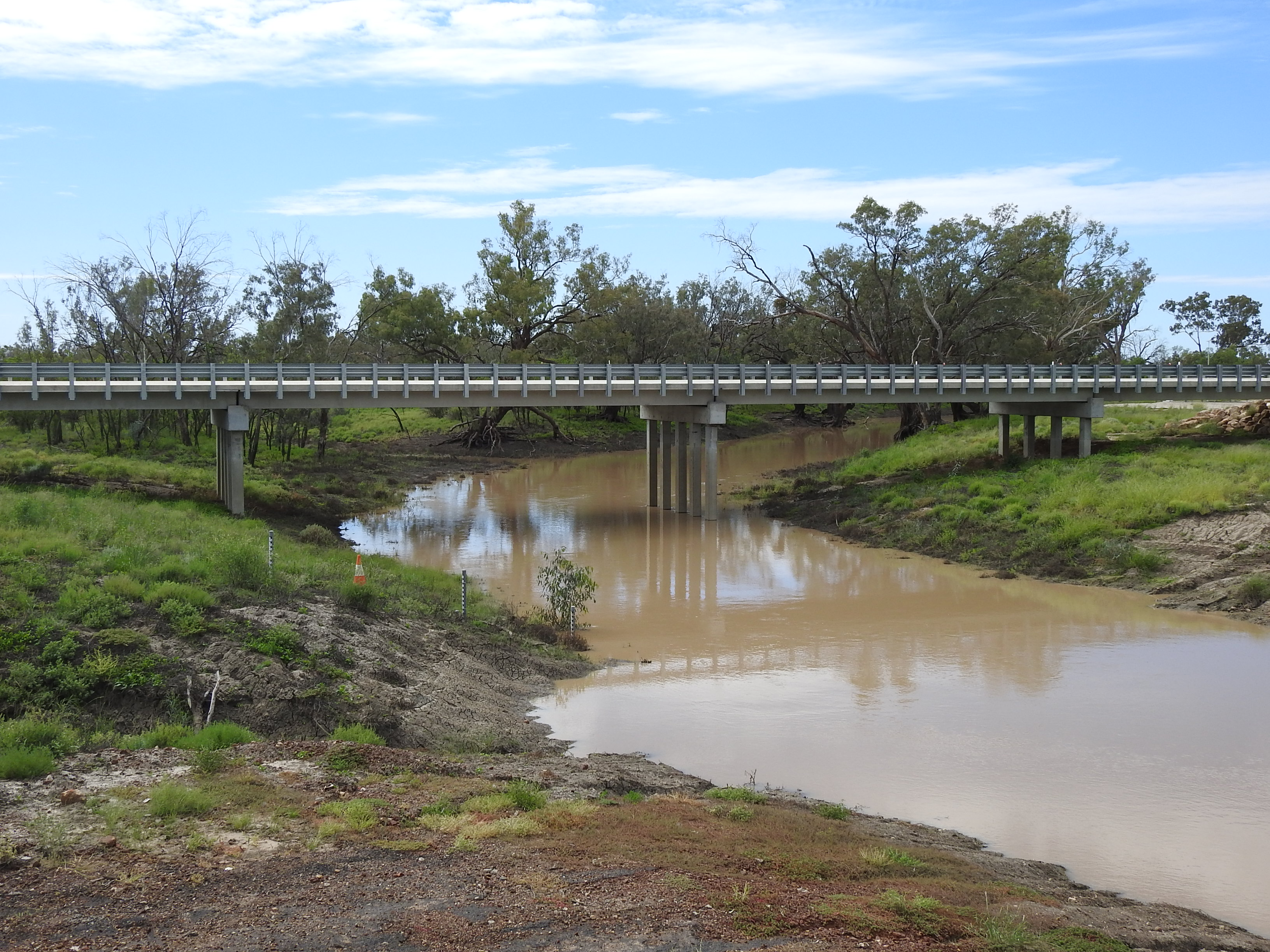
Birrie River new bridge, of the Goodooga Brenda Road (2021).
