= Bokhara River =

Bokhara
- Location of Bokhara River mouth in New South Wales

Location
- Country: Australia
- States: Queensland, New South Wales
- Region: South Downs, North West Slopes
- LGAs: Balonne, Brewarrina
- Settlements: Hebel, Goodooga

Physical characteristics
- Source: Balonne River
  - location: between Dirranbandi and Goodooga, Queensland
  - elevation: 171 m (561 ft)
- Mouth: Barwon River
  - location: west of Brewarrina, New South Wales
  - coordinates: 29°55′28″S 146°41′17″E
  - elevation: 113 m (371 ft)
- Length: 347 km (216 mi)

Basin features
- River system: Murray–Darling basin
- Tributaries
  - left: Fifteen Mile Warrambool, Cuttabunda Swamp Creek, Williams Creek (New South Wales)
  - right: Ballandool River, Little Yamba Creek

The Bokhara River, a watercourse that is part of the Barwon catchment within the Murray–Darling basin, is located in the South Downs region of Queensland, flowing downstream into the north–western slopes of New South Wales, Australia. It flows through the lower Balonne floodplain.

== Course and features ==
The river rises at the Balonne River south of Dirranbandi, within the state of Queensland, and is one of several branches of the Balonne that flows generally south–west, joined by five minor tributaries, before reaching its confluence with the Barwon River, downstream from Brewarrina. The river descends 58 metres (190 ft) over its 347-kilometre (216 mi) course.

The Bokhara River, from its source towards its mouth, flows past the towns of Hebel and Goodooga. Water from the river is used by farmers to irrigate a variety of crops, including barley, wheat and cotton.

== See also ==
- List of rivers of Australia § New South Wales
- List of rivers of Australia § Queensland
