= Ula =

Ula or ULA may refer to:

== Entertainment ==
- Ula (poetry)
- Ula (dance), an ancient Tongan dance
- Ula, the former title for film Chithiram Pesuthadi 2
- Ulster Liberation Army, in the Tom Clancy novel Patriot Games

== Military ==
- Ula (weapon), a Fijian club
- Ula-class submarine, Norway
- HNoMS Ula, several Norwegian submarines

== Organizations ==
- Uganda Lacrosse Association
- Underground Literary Alliance, a writers society
- Union Latino Americana, 1930s
- United Launch Alliance, a space launch service provider
- United League of Arakan, the political wing of the Arakan Army, Myanmar
- United Left Alliance, Ireland
- Universidad Latinoamericana, a Mexican university
- University of the Andes (Venezuela) (Spanish: Universidad de Los Andes)
- Utah Library Association, US

== Places ==
- Ula (Caria), ancient town, now in Turkey
- Ula, Muğla, a municipality and district of Muğla Province, Turkey
- Ula, Norway, a village in Larvik municipality in Vestfold county, Norway
- Ula, Saaremaa Parish, a village in Saaremaa Parish, Saare County in western Estonia
- Väike-Ula (formerly called Ula), a village in Saaremaa Parish, Saare County, Estonia
- Al-Ula, Saudi Arabia, an ancient city
- Ula (river), multiple rivers
- Ula Point, James Ross Island, Antarctica
- Ula oil field, an offshore oil field located in the southern Norwegian section of North Sea
- Ula Nara, a Jurchen-Manchu tribal nation 1561-1613

== Technology ==
- Uncommitted logic array, a type of integrated circuit, see gate array
- Unique local address, in IPv6
- User license agreement, for software

== Given name ==
- A diminutive of the name Urszula
- A diminutive of the name Ursula
- Ula Ložar (born 2002), Slovenian singer
- Ula Levi, a character in Shortland Street
- Ula Sharon (1905–1993), American dancer

== Other uses ==
- Ula (fly), a genus of craneflies
- ULA TV, a Venezuelan channel
- Waco ULA, a biplane
- Fungwa language (ISO 639-3 code), a language of Nigeria

== See also ==
- Ula Ula Division, later Shire of Balonne, Queensland, Australia
- Ulla (disambiguation)
