= County of Belmore =

Belmore Queensland
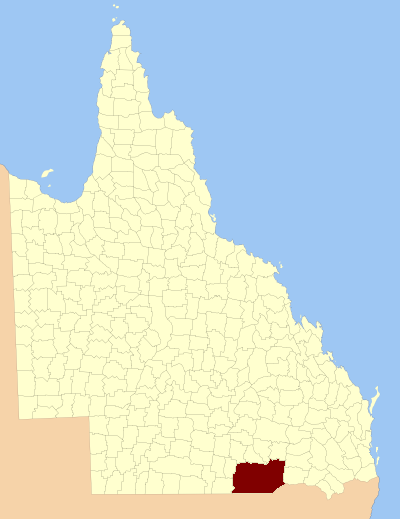
- Location within Queensland
Lands administrative divisions around Belmore:
Tomoo	Maranoa, Elgin	Pring
Mungallala, Nebine	Belmore	Carnarvon
Narran (NSW)	Finch (NSW)	Benarba (NSW)

The County of Belmore is a county in Queensland, Australia, located west of the Darling Downs in the Shire of Balonne.

Like all counties in Queensland, it is a non-functional administrative unit, that is used mainly for the purpose of registering land titles. It was officially named and bounded by the Governor in Council on 7 March 1901 under the Land Act 1897.

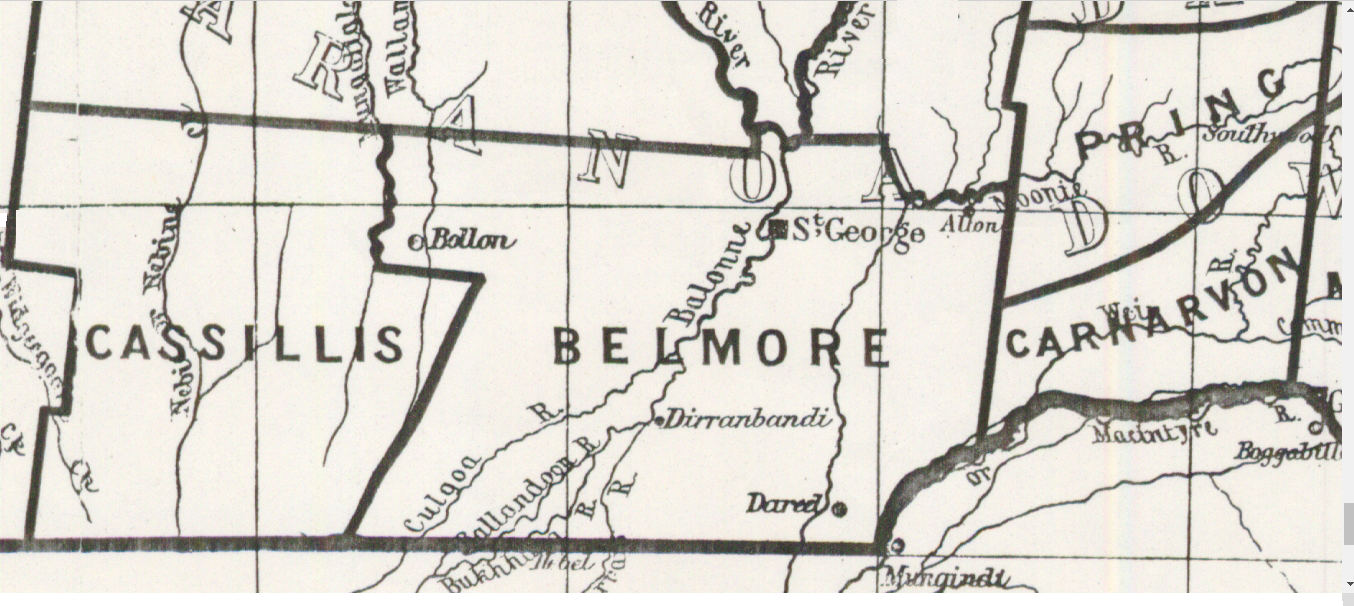
county in 1890

Like all counties in Queensland, it is a non-functional administrative unit, that is used mainly for the purpose of registering land titles. From 30 November 2015, the government no longer referenced counties and parishes in land information systems however the Museum of Lands, Mapping and Surveying retains a record for historical purposes.

== Parishes ==
Belmore is divided into parishes, listed as follows:

Parish	LGA	Coordinates	Towns
Alton	Balonne	28°06′S 149°15′E	Alton
Ballagna	Balonne	28°13′S 149°01′E	
Boah	Balonne	28°29′S 148°21′E	
Bogiria	Balonne	28°55′S 147°47′E	Hebel
Bollon	Balonne	28°01′S 147°26′E	Bollon
Boogah	Balonne	28°21′S 147°26′E	
Bookalong	Balonne	28°37′S 148°23′E	
Booligar	Balonne	28°42′S 148°16′E	
Boombah	Balonne	28°12′S 148°39′E	
Boomi	Balonne	28°35′S 147°28′E	
Borgera	Balonne	27°55′S 147°47′E	
Brenda	Balonne	28°51′S 147°26′E	
Briarie	Balonne	28°49′S 147°43′E	
Bullamon	Balonne	28°40′S 148°53′E	Thallon
Bullindgie	Balonne	28°16′S 147°56′E	
Bumble	Balonne	28°49′S 148°27′E	
Burgorah	Balonne	27°59′S 148°44′E	
Byra	Balonne	28°55′S 147°15′E	
Cardiff	Balonne	27°54′S 147°33′E	
Cawildi	Balonne	28°28′S 148°13′E	
Chippeway	Balonne	28°04′S 147°58′E	
Codernah	Balonne	28°45′S 147°53′E	
Collyben	Balonne	28°52′S 148°59′E	
Cowigella	Balonne	28°38′S 147°46′E	
Cubbie	Balonne	28°39′S 148°01′E	
Culgoa	Balonne	28°45′S 147°20′E	
Cunniana	Balonne	28°35′S 148°40′E	
Cuoygah	Balonne	28°50′S 148°10′E	
Currawildi	Balonne	28°41′S 148°08′E	Dirranbandi
Currawillinghi	Balonne	28°56′S 147°37′E	
Dareel	Balonne	28°49′S 148°50′E	Dareel
Dewurra	Balonne	28°14′S 147°35′E	
Doondi	Balonne	28°23′S 148°25′E	
Dunwinnie	Balonne	28°40′S 148°38′E	
Eugun	Balonne	28°07′S 148°19′E	
Euraba	Balonne	28°48′S 148°00′E	
Fairymount	Goondiwindi	28°07′S 149°22′E	
Geralda	Goondiwindi	28°18′S 149°16′E	
Gerar	Balonne	28°32′S 148°52′E	
Gnoolooma	Balonne	28°56′S 148°38′E	
Goonaro	Balonne	28°56′S 147°59′E	
Goulamain	Balonne	27°53′S 149°03′E	
Gulnarbar	Balonne	28°07′S 148°29′E	
Gurardera	Goondiwindi	28°26′S 149°15′E	
Guy Guy	Balonne	28°14′S 148°23′E	
Hollymount	Balonne	28°05′S 149°07′E	
Karee	Balonne	28°20′S 148°33′E	
Katoota	Balonne	27°51′S 148°45′E	
Keebrah	Balonne	28°32′S 148°07′E	
Kirk	Balonne	28°10′S 148°08′E	
Kooroon	Balonne	27°52′S 149°25′E	
Kulki	Balonne	28°34′S 147°37′E	
Kullinjah	Balonne	27°57′S 148°14′E	
Marilla	Balonne	28°57′S 148°13′E	
Maroungle	Balonne	27°58′S 148°23′E	
Melanga	Balonne	28°25′S 148°43′E	
Minimi	Balonne	28°07′S 148°51′E	
Mona	Balonne	28°09′S 147°24′E	
Moombah	Balonne	27°53′S 149°14′E	
Mugan	Goondiwindi	28°45′S 149°05′E	
Mungindi	Balonne	28°56′S 148°52′E	Mungindi
Newinga	Goondiwindi	28°36′S 149°21′E	
Nindigully	Balonne	28°22′S 148°53′E	Nindigully
Ningham	Balonne	28°16′S 148°50′E	
Noondoo	Balonne	28°48′S 148°38′E	
Runnymede	Balonne	28°22′S 147°15′E	
St George	Balonne	28°05′S 148°40′E	St George
Shirley	Balonne	28°29′S 148°31′E	
Thomby	Balonne	27°57′S 148°53′E	
Tilquin	Balonne	28°05′S 147°32′E	
Tootherang	Balonne	28°30′S 147°53′E	
Towtowri	Balonne	27°56′S 147°57′E	
Uhr	Balonne	28°06′S 147°43′E	
Wagaily	Balonne	27°59′S 148°34′E	
Wandibingie	Goondiwindi	28°34′S 149°08′E	
Weengallon	Goondiwindi	28°22′S 149°02′E	Weengallon
Weeyan	Balonne	27°44′S 148°50′E	
Whitalby	Balonne	28°11′S 147°50′E	
Whyenbah	Balonne	28°19′S 148°14′E	
Willarie	Goondiwindi	28°40′S 149°14′E	
Wombil	Balonne	28°23′S 148°03′E	
Wondit	Balonne	27°56′S 148°04′E	
Woolerina	Balonne	28°43′S 147°35′E	
Wunger	Balonne	27°44′S 149°03′E	
Wyenbirra	Balonne	28°34′S 147°17′E	
Yamma	Balonne	28°25′S 147°38′E	
Yangle	Balonne	28°54′S 148°24′E	
