= Akam =

AKAM or Akam may refer to:

- Akam (film), a 2011 Indian Malayalam psychological thriller film
- Akam (poetry)
- Akam (surname)
- Aga Khan Agency for Microfinance, a Swiss not-for-profit agency
- Akamai Technologies, which trades on the NASDAQ stock exchange under the symbol "AKAM"
- Akam (wrestler), ring name of professional wrestler Sunny Dhinsa
