= Naming conventions of the Tamilakam =

Naming conventions of the Tamilakam in the Sangam literature have been one of the foremost concerns of Tamilology. The Surnames of the Caṅkam Age: Literary & Tribal, published in 1968 sought to offer one of the earliest treatments in this area.

== Background ==
The Cankam literature is thematically divided into akam and puram. The poets worked under a convention of anonymity, not exposing the names of the heroes, heroines and friends in their poems, particularly in the former, in order to underline the universality of the feelings expressed in their poetry.

== Tolkappiyam classifications ==
The Tolkāppiyam identifies ten categories of names. An̲n̲i Mirutalakumāri Tāmacu claims to have completely revealed the basis on which the Tamils adopted their names.

== Wilden classifications ==
Eva Wildern identifies four types of names found in the Sangam literature: proper names, proper names connected with a name of a place or a dynasty, proper names with epithets and imagery names. This convention was codified in the Tolkāppiyam.

== Tantaipeyar ==
This tradition involves firstly having the father's name followed by one's own name. This system was carried even into the medieval period.

Examples include cēramān, meaning "son of Chera" composed of cēra and makan, or vēlmān, meaning "son of Vel" composed of vēl and makan.

== Fives parts of a name ==
The convention is remains that dynastic name is followed by the proper name. However, in the case of distinguished persons, there may be up to five parts to it.

Parimelazhagar (c. 13th century) codified the Classical-era conventions in his explanation of the correct name of Yanaikatchai Mantaran Cheral Irumporai as Kōccēramān Yāṇaikkaṭcēi Māntarañcēral Irumpoṛai. Kō meaning 'king' signifying his official title; Cēramān is the dynastic name; Yāṇaikkat 'Elephant-eyed' is a distinctive feature; Cēi is the iyatpeyar, or proper name; and Irumporai is an appellate.

Another example is Malayamān Cōzhiya Ēnati Tirukkaṇṇan. Malayamān is the dynastic name; Cōzhiya, "of the Chola Nadu; 'Ēnati" is the title of conferred by the King to the chief of the army in a ceremony known as Ēnatippatiyam; and Tirukkaṇṇan is his iyatpeyar, or proper name.

=== Dynastic name ===
Poets spoke to kings about the need for children for carrying on the family or dynastic name.

The dynastic or family name acts as a prefix and occurs before the actual name.

=== Titles ===
Some titles such as 'Kō' meaning 'king' were acquired, while others were conferred by the King. Three titles particularly renowned were known as Etti, Enati and Kaviti. Talaikkoli, Peraiyan and Marayan are a few of the other titles bestowed to eminent personalities in consideration to their talents in particular fields.

== See also ==
- Tamil naming conventions, for Tamil naming conventions in modern times
