= Iraicchi =

Technique used in Tamil poetry

Iraicchi (Tamil இறைச்சி iṟaicci, literally, "flesh") is a technique of suggestion used in the classical Tamil poetic tradition, particularly akam poetry.

Iraicchi is closely connected with the extensive descriptions of natural phenomena or objects that characterise classical Tamil poetry. The technique of iraicchi involves using these descriptions to create an implication, or suggestion, which differs from the plain meaning of the words. This implication flows from the conventionalised symbolic meanings which the natural objects described in the poem have. Readers familiar with the conventions of Tamil poetry can, therefore, perceive these meanings "reading between the lines".

Modern commentators disagree on the precise relationship of iraicchi with other literary techniques used in Tamil poetry. Some, such as Zvelebil, Nadarajah and Mariaselvam treat iraicchi as being synonymous with uṭaṉuṟai, which is one of five types of indirect metaphor discussed in the Tolkappiyam, an early text on grammar and poetics. Thus, according to them, iraicchi is an alternative to other literary techniques such as uḷḷuṟai uvamam, and is therefore distinct from them.

Other commentators, such as Selby, treat iraicchi as being the goal of these indirect metaphors. In Selby's interpretation, poets use descriptions of natural objects forming part of the landscape in which the poem is situated (the poem's tiṇai) to generate implicit metaphors (uḷḷuṟai). These metaphors suggest an implied meaning (iṟaicci) which goes beyond the plain meaning of the words of poem. This implied meaning conveys to the reader the emotion, feeling or mood (meyppāṭu) which the characters of the poem experience. Thus uḷḷuṟai uvamam and other types of metaphors are, in this reading, simply ways of conveying iraicchi, rather than alternatives to it.

In either sense, iraicchi has some similarities with the technique of dhvani used in Sanskrit and Maharashtri poetry. Selby, however, points to important differences. Tamil poems are conventionalised, and the descriptions of nature used in them have a clear and rigid symbolism. A reader who is aware of the symbolic significance of the various natural objects described in the poem can easily understand the various levels of meaning contained in the poem. Dhvani, in contrast, lacks the structure of this type of convention and as a result is naturally polysemic, and the reader of poem requires the aid of commentators to fully understand its various levels of meaning. As a result, she argues, the process involved in the two systems are entirely different, as far as the reader is concerned.

== Sources ==
- Gnanasambandan, A.S. (1973), "Tolkappiyar's concept of Uvamai", Journal of Tamil Studies, 4: 1–12
- Mariaselvam, Abraham (1988), The Song of Songs and Ancient Tamil Love Poems: Poetry and Symbolism, Rome: Pontificium Institutum Biblicum, ISBN 88-7653-118-1
- Nadarajah, Devapoopathy (1994), Love in Sanskrit and Tamil Literature, Delhi: Motilal Banarasidass, ISBN 978-8120812154
- Selby, Martha Ann (2000), Grow Long, Blessed Night: Love Poems from Classical India, New York: Oxford University Press, ISBN 0-19-512734-X
- Zvelebil, Kamil (1973), The Smile of Murugan: On Tamil Literature of South India, Leiden: E.J. Brill, ISBN 90-04-03591-5
