= Dirranbandi Airport =

Airport in Queensland, Australia

- IATA: DRN; ICAO: YDBI

Summary
- Airport type: Public
- Operator: Balonne Shire Council
- Serves: Dirranbandi, Queensland, Australia
- Elevation AMSL: 567 ft / 173 m
- Coordinates: 28°35′11″S 148°13′04″E

Map
- Location in Queensland

Runways
Direction	Length		Surface
Direction	m	ft	Surface
01/19	1,217	3,993	Gravel/asphalt
- Sources: AIP

Dirranbandi Airport (IATA: DRN, ICAO: YDBI) is an airport serving Dirranbandi, Queensland, Australia.

It is operated by the Balonne Shire Council. It has a 1,000-metre (3,300 ft) sealed runway with lights.

== See also ==
- List of airports in Queensland
