= Ulaş (disambiguation) =

Ulaş is a town and district of Sivas Province in Turkey.

Ulaş, Ulas, or ULAS may also refer to:

== People ==
=== Given or middle name ===
- Ulaş Bardakçı (1947–1972), Turkish communist
- Ulaş Güler (born 1980), Turkish footballer
- Ulas Hayes (1918–1990), American preacher and civil-rights icon
- Ulaş Mangıtlı, Turkish cartoonist and illustrator
- Ulaş Özdemir, Turkish Alevi musician
- Ulas Samchuk (1905–1987), Ukrainian writer, publicist and journalist
- Furkan Ulaş Memiş (born 1991), Turkish bantamweight boxer
- Gregory Ulas Powell (1933–2012), American murderer

=== Surname ===
- Elif Ulaş (born 1986), Turkish figure skater and ice hockey player
- Meliha Ulaş (1901–1941), Turkish parliamentarian and teacher
- Ulas family, Turkish family who walk on all fours
- Vladimir Ulas (born 1960), Russian politician

== Places ==
- Ulaş, a town and district, Sivas Province, Turkey
- Ulaş, Arhavi, a village in Arhavi district, Artvin Province, Turkey
- Ulaş, Dargeçit, a Kurdish depopulated village in Dargeçit district, Mardin Province, Turkey
- Ulaş, Gercüş, a village in Gercüş district, Batman Province, Turkey
- Ulaş, Kırıkkale, a populated place in Kırıkkale district, Kırıkkale Province, Turkey
- Ulaş, Milas, a populated place in Milas district, Muğla Province, Turkey
- Ulaş, Tarsus, a village in Tarsus district, Mersin Province, Turkey
- Ulaş, Tekirdağ, a town in Çorlu district, Tekirdağ Province, Turkey
- Ulaş, Tokat, a populated place in Tokat district, Tokat Province, Turkey
- Solovki Airport (ICAO code ULAS), Russian airport for the Solovetsky Islands

== Other ==
- Battle of Ulaş, 1696 battle between the Ottoman and Habsburg armies
- UKIDSS Large Area Survey (ULAS), an astronomical survey
- University of Leicester Archaeological Services (ULAS)
- University of London Air Squadron (ULAS), part of the Royal Air Force Volunteer Reserve

== See also ==
- Ula (disambiguation)
- Ulhas (disambiguation)
