= Ula (poetry) =

Poetry concept

Ulā relays a puṟam concept using akam imagery. By the Middle Ages, the strict separation between akam and puṟam was no longer observed. Chola poet Ottakoothar wrote three Ula poems namely, Koluthunga Cholan Ulla, Vikkiramacolanula and Rajarajan Cholan Ulla which come from a genre merging akam and puṟam called ulā. They describe the royal procession of the king through the streets observed by women. Despite their different ages and social estates, all of them experience love sickness brought on by the King's magnificence. Using the women' gaze as a device, reader are meant to cast themselves in their place.

== See also ==
- Sangam literature
- Sangam period
