= Ulhas (disambiguation) =

Ulhas may refer to:

- Ulhas River, in India

== People ==
- Ulhas (actor) (1913–1969), Indian actor
- Ulhas Bapat (1950–2018), Indian musician
- Ulhas Koravi Satyanarayan (born 1998), Indian basketball player

== Similar terms ==
- Ulaş (disambiguation)
