= Ullurai =

Technique used in classical Tamil poetry

Ullurai (Tamil உள்ளுறை uḷḷuṟai literally, "inner meaning") is a type of extended allusion or metaphor used in classical Tamil poetry.

Five types of ullurai are described in the Tolkappiyam, an early treatise on grammar and poetics. These are uṭaṉuṟai, uvamam, cuṭṭu, nakai and cirappu. The first two of these, the treatise says, were in use in the classical period. The other three had been used in earlier periods, but were no longer in use in his time. Few examples of their use survive outside texts on literary theory.

Ilampuranar, an early mediaeval commentator, describes the constituents of each of the five types of ullurai.

- uṭaṉuṟai consists of describing a phenomenon, object or happening, which suggests something different from what is directly described. The thing, feeling or happening suggested is not evident in the words of the poem, but is inferred from what is described. In akam poetry, the words that create the utanurai are usually spoken by the heroine of the poem, or by her friend, though there are exceptions. The hidden meaning of the words is frequently something which the person to whom they are addressed - the hero of the poem, or his friend - will understand, or is intended to understand. It may be generated using associations specific to the poem's tiṇai - the geographical landscape in which its action is set - but, unlike other types of ullurai, utanurai may also be rooted in associations that have no connection with the poem's thinai.
- uvamam, or uḷḷuṟai uvamam is the main literary device used in akam poetry. In this device, the objects of nature described in the poem symbolise the characters in the situation described in the poem. Each of these objects is associated with the specific geographical landscape (tiṇai) in which the poem is set, and the characters they symbolise are based on conventional meanings which the objects in question have. For example, a description of a buffalo treading on a lotus as he feeds on small flowers symbolises an unfaithful man (the buffalo) who makes his lover suffer (the act of treading on the lotus) by visiting prostitutes (the small flowers). Ilakkuvanar, a modern commentator on Tamil literary theory, distinguishes between uḷḷuṟai uvamam, which operates by way of suggestion, and ēṉai uvamam, which involves a more explicit comparison, but not all modern commentators make this distinction.
- Ilampuranar deals with the other three forms of ullurai more perfunctorily. cuttu occurs when a poem points to a particular object whilst, in reality, aiming at a different object. nakai occurs when the description of situation, on the face of it, is humorous or provokes laughter, but, in actuality, indicates something more serious. cirappu consists of stating that one thing is greater than, or superior to, another thing and, through the comparison, indicating a third thing not named.

Ilampuranar states that the key characteristic of ullurai is it functions as a literary device which causes the reader to perceive or understand something - a person, object or feeling - that is different from what the words of the poem describe. According to Nachchinarkkiniyar, a late mediaeval commentator, elaborates further. The essence of ullurai - which distinguishes it from other types of similes (uvamai) - is, he says, the absence from the simile not only of express terms of comparison, but also of the thing or emotion that is the subject of the comparison. He gives the example of the phrase: "coral-like lips". In order to be ullurai, the poem must not only not use the word "like", it should make no mention of "lips" at all. If it does, the literary device it uses is not considered "ullurai", but is classified as some other type of simile (uvamai).

Modern commentators are divided on the nature of the relationship between ullurai and other literary techniques described in traditional treatises on Tamil poetics. Selby treats the purpose of ullurai as being the creation of iraicchi - a sense of recognition in readers, which leads them to understand the inner meaning of the poem. Other modern commentators treat iraicchi as being a type of ullurai, usually treating it as being a synonym for, or closely related to, uṭaṉuṟai.

== Sources ==
- Ilakkuvanar, S. (1963), Tolkappiyam in English with Critical Studies, Madurai: Kural Neri Publishing
- Mariaselvam, Abraham (1988), The Song of Songs and Ancient Tamil Love Poems: Poetry and Symbolism, Rome: Pontificium Institutum Biblicum, ISBN 88-7653-118-1
- Nadarajah, Devapoopathy (1994), Love in Sanskrit and Tamil Literature, Delhi: Motilal Banarasidass, ISBN 81-208-1215-8
- Ramasami Pillai, Se. Re., ed. (1953), Tolkappiyam porulatikaram ilampuranar uraiyutan, vol. 2, Tirunelveli: The South India Saiva Siddhantha Works Publishing Society
- Selby, Martha Ann (2000), Grow Long, Blessed Night: Love Poems from Classical India, New York: Oxford University Press, ISBN 0-19-512734-X
- Zvelebil, Kamil (1973), The Smile of Murugan: On Tamil Literature of South India, Leiden: E.J. Brill, ISBN 90-04-03591-5
