= Ula (river) =

Ula may refer to the following rivers:

- Ūla, river in Belarus and Lithuania
- Ula (Western Dvina tributary), Belarus
- Ula (Gorkaya tributary), Stavropol Krai, Russia
- Ula (Luza tributary), Komi Republic, Russia
