= Akam (surname) =

Akam is an English surname. Notable people with the surname include:

- Dave Akam (born 1960), English track and road cyclist
- Michael Akam (born 1952), British zoologist
- Simon Akam, British journalist and historian

== See also ==
- Akam Hashim (born 1998) Iraqi football player
