= Dirranbandi, Queensland =

Rural town in south-western Queensland, Australia

Dirranbandi
- Town
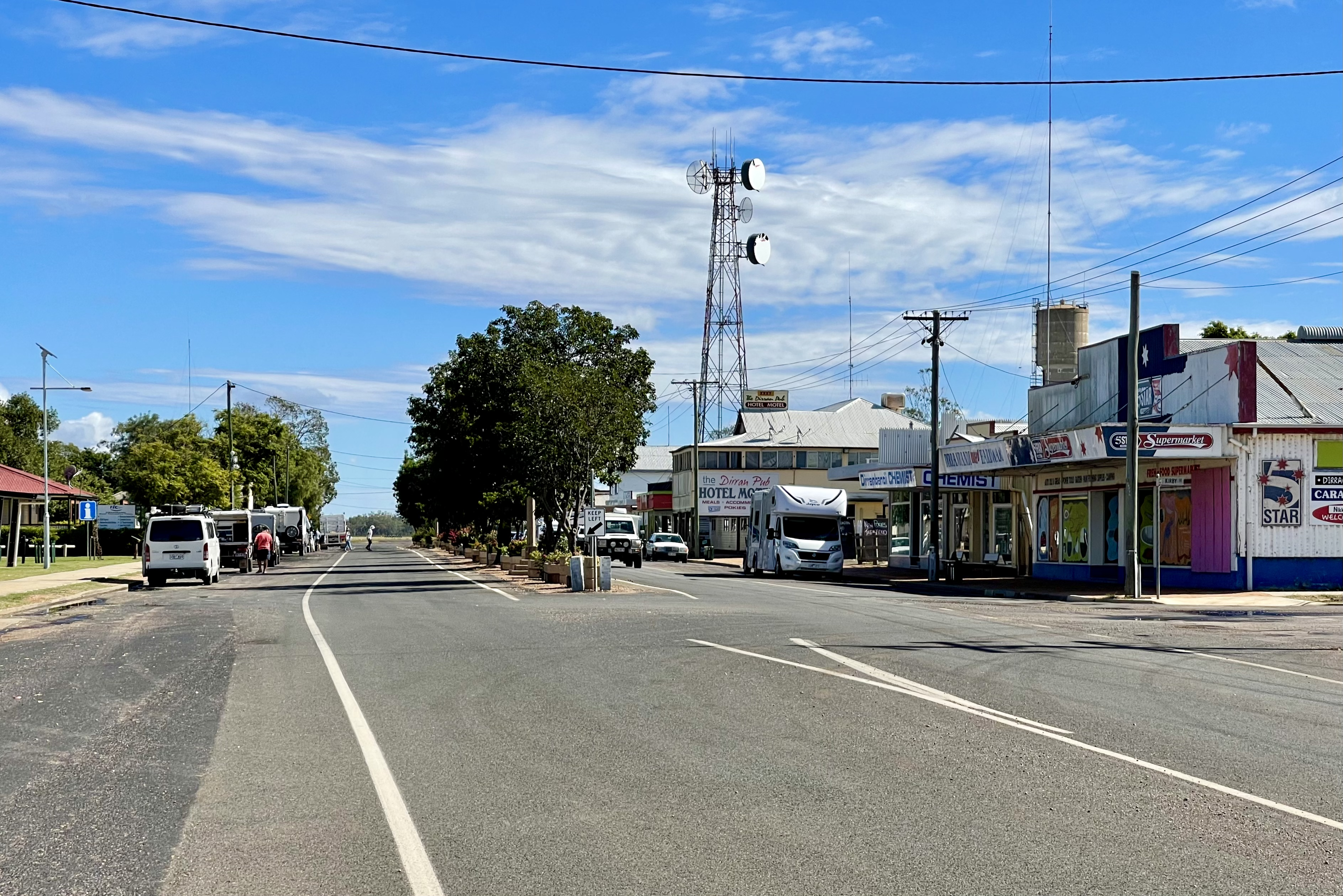
- Railway Street (Castlereagh Highway) Dirranbandi, 2021

- Interactive map of Dirranbandi
- Coordinates: 28.5833°S 148.2277°E
- Country: Australia
- State: Queensland
- LGA: Balonne Shire
- Location: 95.4 km (59.3 mi) SW of St George; 456 km (283 mi) WSW of Toowoomba; 585 km (364 mi) WSW of Brisbane
- Established: 1885

Government
  - State electorate: Warrego
  - Federal division: Maranoa

Area
  - Total: 8,250.4 km^{2} (3,185.5 sq mi)
- Elevation: 173 m (568 ft)

Population
  - Total: 610 (2021 census)
  - Density: 0.0739/km^{2} (0.1915/sq mi)
- Time zone: UTC+10:00 (AEST)
- Postcode: 4486
Localities around Dirranbandi
Bollon	St George	Thallon
Hebel	Dirranbandi	Mungindi
Angledool (NSW)	Lightning Ridge (NSW)	Collarenebri (NSW)

Dirranbandi is a rural town and locality in the Shire of Balonne, Queensland, Australia. The locality is on the border of Queensland with New South Wales. In the 2021 census, the locality of Dirranbandi had a population of 610 people.

== Geography ==
Dirranbandi is on the Castlereagh Highway and the Balonne River. It is notable for the population variations each year as seasonal workers come to work on the extensive cotton fields. Due to the low annual rainfall, irrigation is used extensively.

== History ==
Yuwaalaraay (also known as Yuwalyai, Euahlayi, Yuwaaliyaay, Gamilaraay, Kamilaroi, Yuwaaliyaayi) is an Australian Aboriginal language spoken on Yuwaalaraay country. The Yuwaalaraay language region includes the landscape within the local government boundaries of the Shire of Balonne, including the town of Dirranbandi as well as the border town of Hebel extending to Walgett and Collarenebri in New South Wales.

Yuwaalayaay (also known as Yuwalyai, Euahlayi, Yuwaaliyaay, Gamilaraay, Kamilaroi, Yuwaaliyaayi) is an Australian Aboriginal language spoken on Yuwaalayaay country. It is closely related to the Gamilaraay and Yuwaalaraay languages. The Yuwaalayaay language region includes the landscape within the local government boundaries of the Shire of Balonne, including the town of Dirranbandi as well as the border town of Goodooga extending to Walgett and the Narran Lakes in New South Wales.

Gamilaraay (also known as Gamilaroi, Kamilaroi, Comilroy) is an Aboriginal language from south-west Queensland and north-west New South Wales. The Gamilaraay language region includes the landscape within the local government boundaries of the Balonne Shire Council, including the towns of Dirranbandi, Thallon, Talwood and Bungunya as well as the border towns of Mungindi and Boomi extending to Moree, Tamworth and Coonabarabran in NSW.

The town reserve was surveyed in March 1885 by surveyor Claudius Buchanan Whish. He is believed to have named the town using an Aboriginal word, meaning either broken forest country or chorus of frogs at night. The name may be derived from a Yuwaaliyaay dialect placename, Dhurrunbandaay, relating to dhurrun.gal ("hairy caterpillars") and baanda-y ("move in single file").

One hundred housing allotments were first set aside, followed by land for a police station, a state school, and post office.

Dirranbandi Provisional School opened on 9 June 1902, but closed in April 1905. It reopened on 20 January 1908 and became Dirranbandi State School on 1 January 1909. On 29 January 1963, a secondary department to Year 10 was added.

The South Western railway reached Dirranbandi on 22 May 1913. The town was served by the Dirranbandi railway station in Railway Street (28.5864°S 148.2272°E). Kundilam railway station served the rural areas 10 kilometres (6.2 mi) to the east of the town (28.5981°S 148.3264°E). The name Kundilam is an Aboriginal word meaning scrub berry. On 28 June 1917 Kundilam railway renamed Bonathorne railway station, named after the adjacent Bonathorne pastoral station of Alfred Allen Moore (the Bonathorne pastoral station still exists as at 8 May 2020). Noondoo railway station was approx 20 kilometres (12 mi) east of the town (28.6097°S 148.4297°E); it was named by the Queensland Railways Department on 29 October after the Noondoo pastoral station which in turn is an Aboriginal name either for the spring near the homestead or the shrub growing near the spring. Hawkston railway station was located approximately 30 kilometres (19 mi) east of the town (28.6214°S 148.5333°E).

The Catholic church in Dirranbandi was expected to be opened by Archbishop James Duhig on Sunday 25 April 1926, but it was not until 13 May 1928 that he was able to officially open St. Therese's Catholic Church.

In September 1934 Mr. A. Clayton was contracted to build an Anglican church in Dirranbandi to the design of Brisbane architect, S. W. Prior. It was intended to be serviced by the Bush Brotherhood. By February 1935 it was open for services, but it was not until Saturday 15 February 1936 that Bishop Horace Dixon was able to come to Dirranbandi dedicate the church as St Mark's Anglican Church.

Dirranbandi had the honour of being the destination for the last mail train to operate in Australia. The Thallon-to-Dirranbandi section of the line was closed on 2 September 2010.

The Culgoa Floodplain National Park lies 130 kilometres (81 mi) to the south-west. The town experienced serious flooding in February–March 2010 and January 2011.

During 2020 and 2021, the Queensland borders were closed to most people due to the COVID-19 pandemic. Border crossing points were either closed or had a Queensland Police checkpoint to allow entry to only those people with an appropriate permit. The border crossing point on the Koomalah Road at Dirranbandi was closed.

== Demographics ==
At the 2011 census, Dirranbandi had a population of 711.

In the 2016 census, Dirranbandi had a population of 640 people. 79.9% of people were born in Australia and 85.2% of people spoke only English at home. The most common responses for religion were Catholic 29.3%, Anglican 26.5%, and No Religion 14.8%.

In the 2021 census, the locality of Dirranbandi had a population of 610 people.

== Education ==
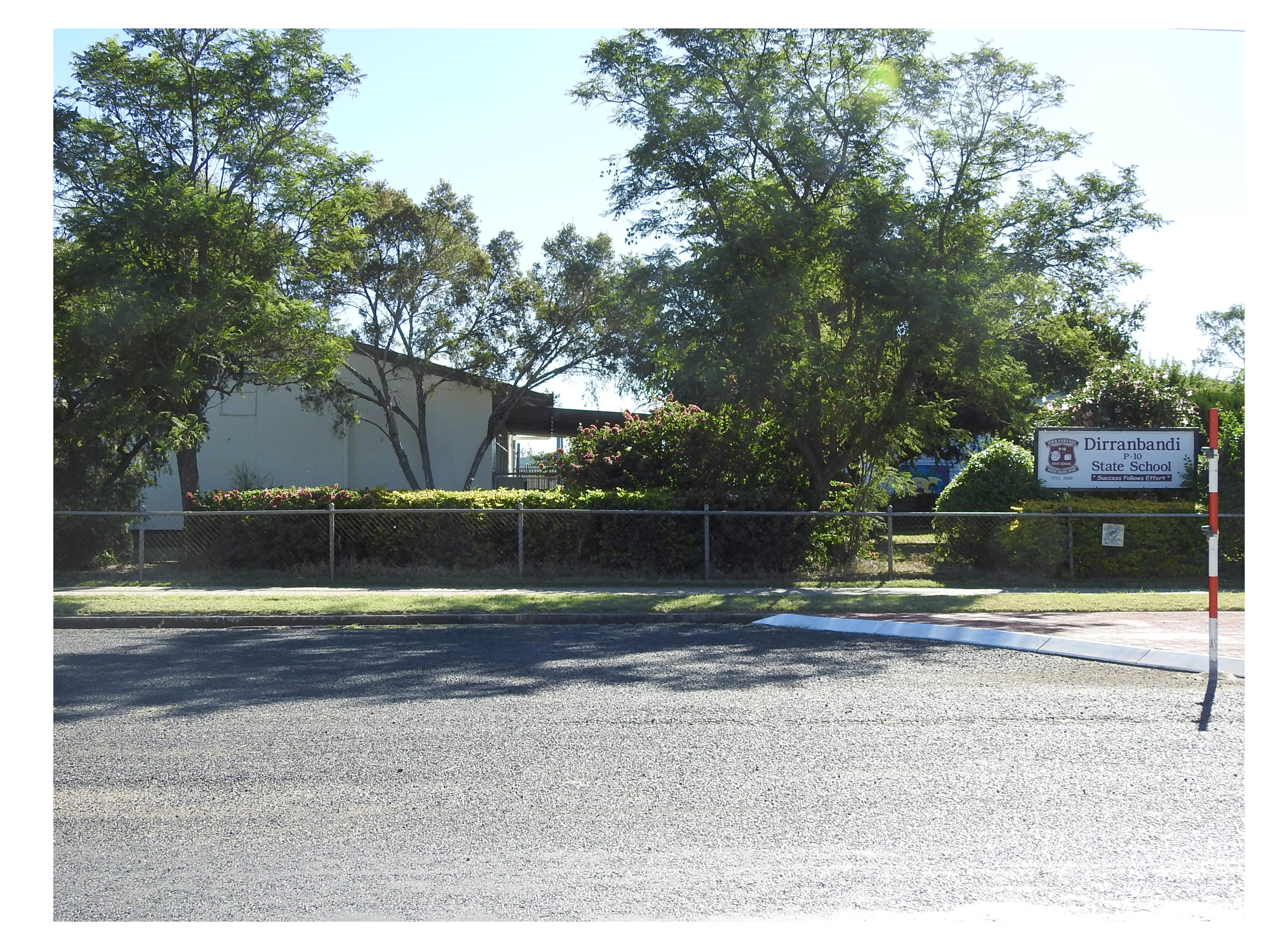
Dirranbandi P-10 State School, 2021

Dirranbandi P–10 State School is a government primary and secondary (Prep–10) school for boys and girls at Jane Street (28.5770°S 148.2300°E). In 2015, the school had 73 students with 12 teachers (11 full-time equivalent). In 2017, the school had an enrolment of 65 students with 13 teachers (11 full-time equivalent) and 13 non-teaching staff (9 full-time equivalent).

For secondary education to Year 12, the nearest government school is St George State High School in neighbouring St George to the north-west, but, given the distance, distance education and boarding school would be other options.

== Facilities ==
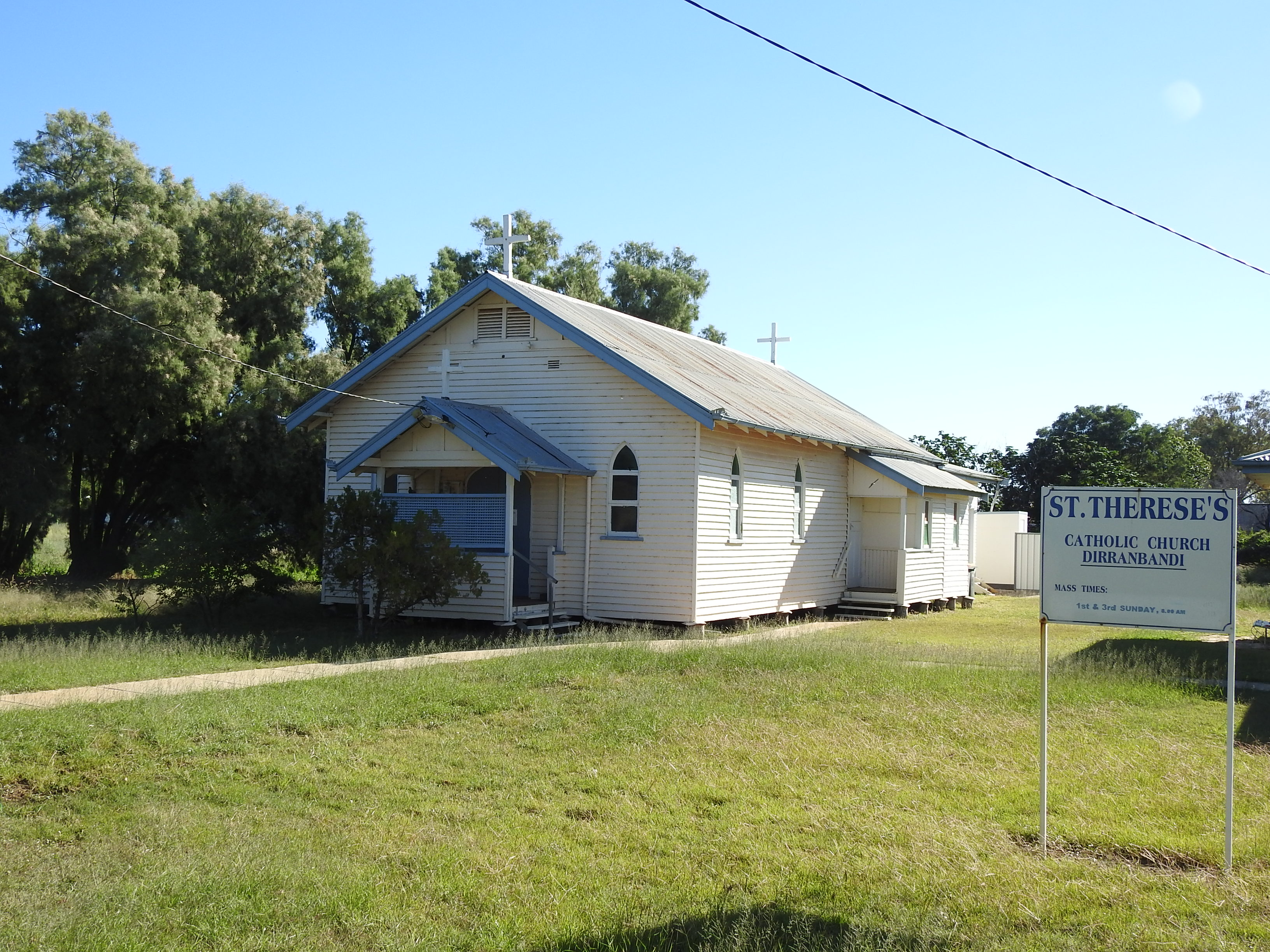
St Therese's Catholic Church, 2021

Dirranbandi has a hospital, civic centre, swimming pool, park and showground.

Balonne Shire Council operates a library on the Castlereagh Highway inside the Rural Transaction Centre.

The Dirranbandi branch of the Queensland Country Women's Association has its rooms at 22 Kirby Street (28.5832°S 148.2281°E).

St Therese's Catholic Church is at 42 Kirby Street (28.5812°S 148.2283°E); it is part of the parish of St Patrick's Parish headquartered in St George.

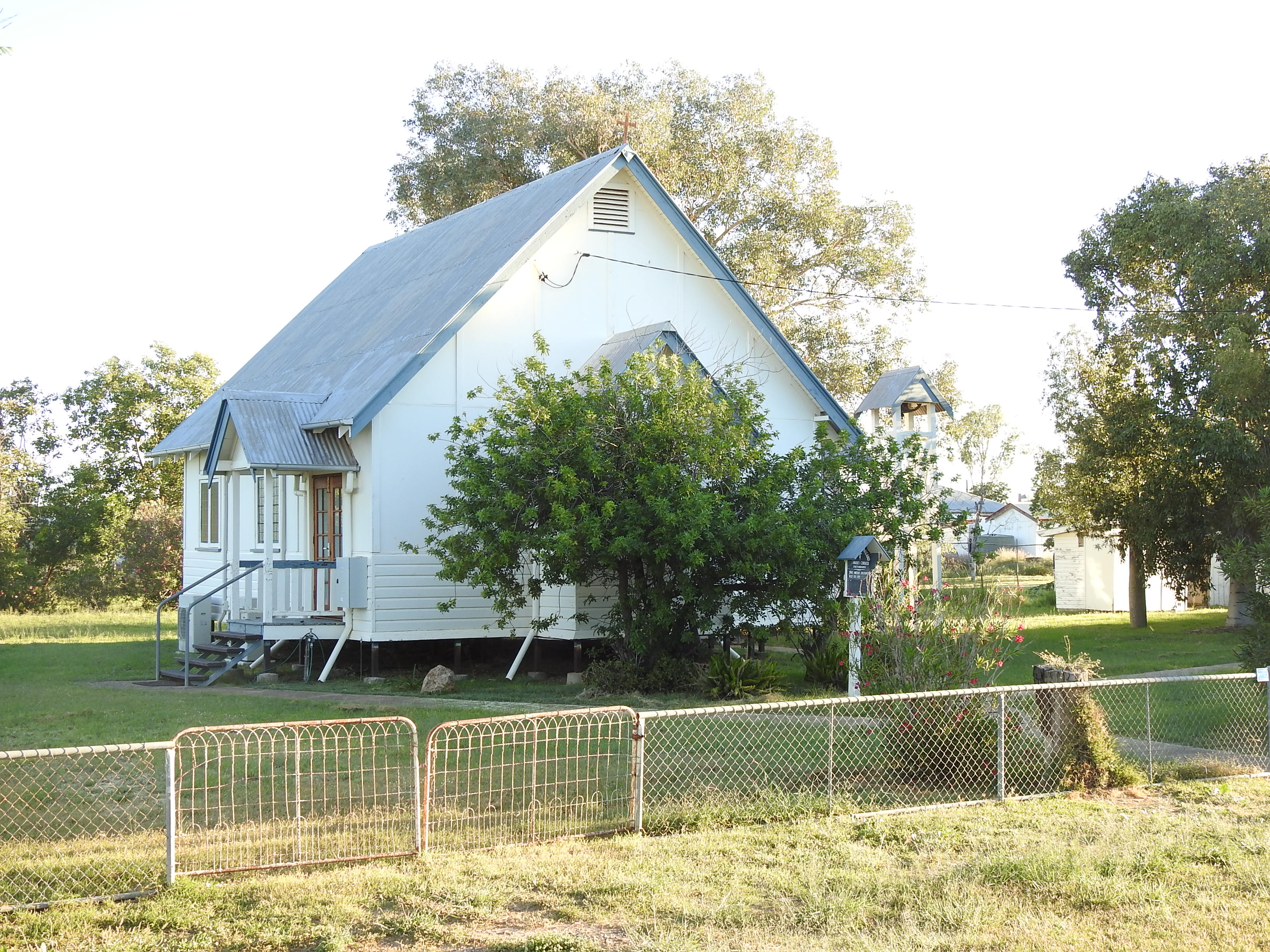
St Mark's Anglican Church, 2021

St Mark's Anglican Church is at 55 Moore Street (28.5851°S 148.2288°E).

Dirranbandi Uniting Church meet at the Anglican Church in Moore Street. It is part of the Uniting Church in Australia.

Dirranbandi Aerodrome is located at the western end of Moore Street (28.5839°S 148.2221°E). It is operated by the Balonne Shire Council. It has a 1,000-metre (3,300 ft) sealed runway with lights.

== Popular culture ==
Slim Dusty sang about being the Dirranbandi Dandy in the song "Cunnamulla Fella", which he co-wrote with Stan Coster.

== Notable people ==
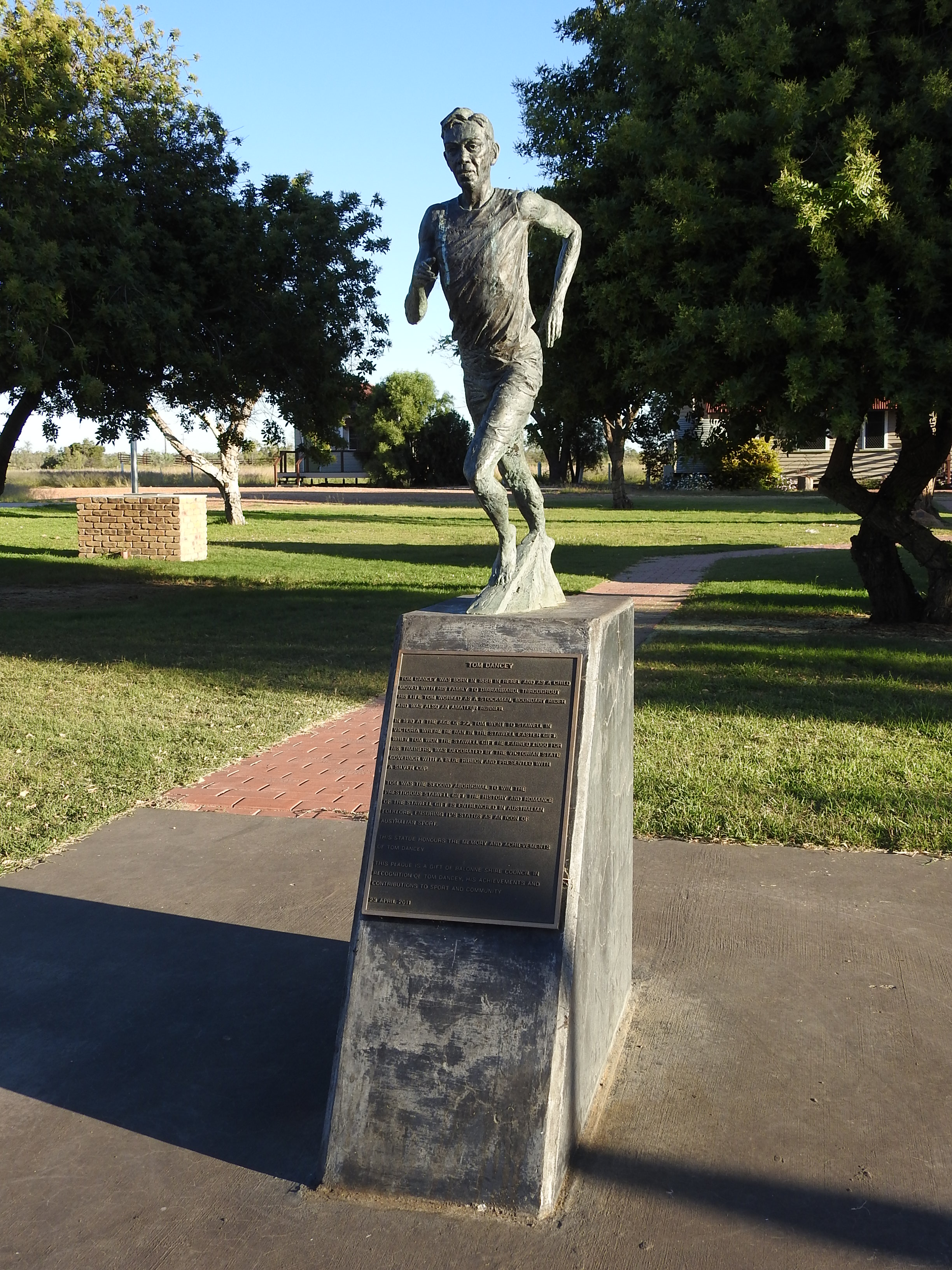
Statue of runner Tom DANCEY, Railway Street Park (2021).

Tom Dancey (1888–1957), a local stockman and Indigenous Australian, won Australia's most famous footrace, the Stawell Gift in 1910. It is indicated the £1000 prize money was kept by his handlers and he only got the trophy.

Brigadier General William Grant (1870–1939) post-World War I bought land in the area. He was involved in the Australian Light Horse. Artwork commemorates Dirranbandi's contributions to the Light Horse in terms of men and horses.

Actor Ray Meagher grew up near Dirranbandi. He is best known for playing Alf Stewart on soap opera Home and Away, and credits one of his character's catchphrases "Stone the flamin' crows!" to Dick Backhouse who was a stock and station agent in town.

== Gallery ==
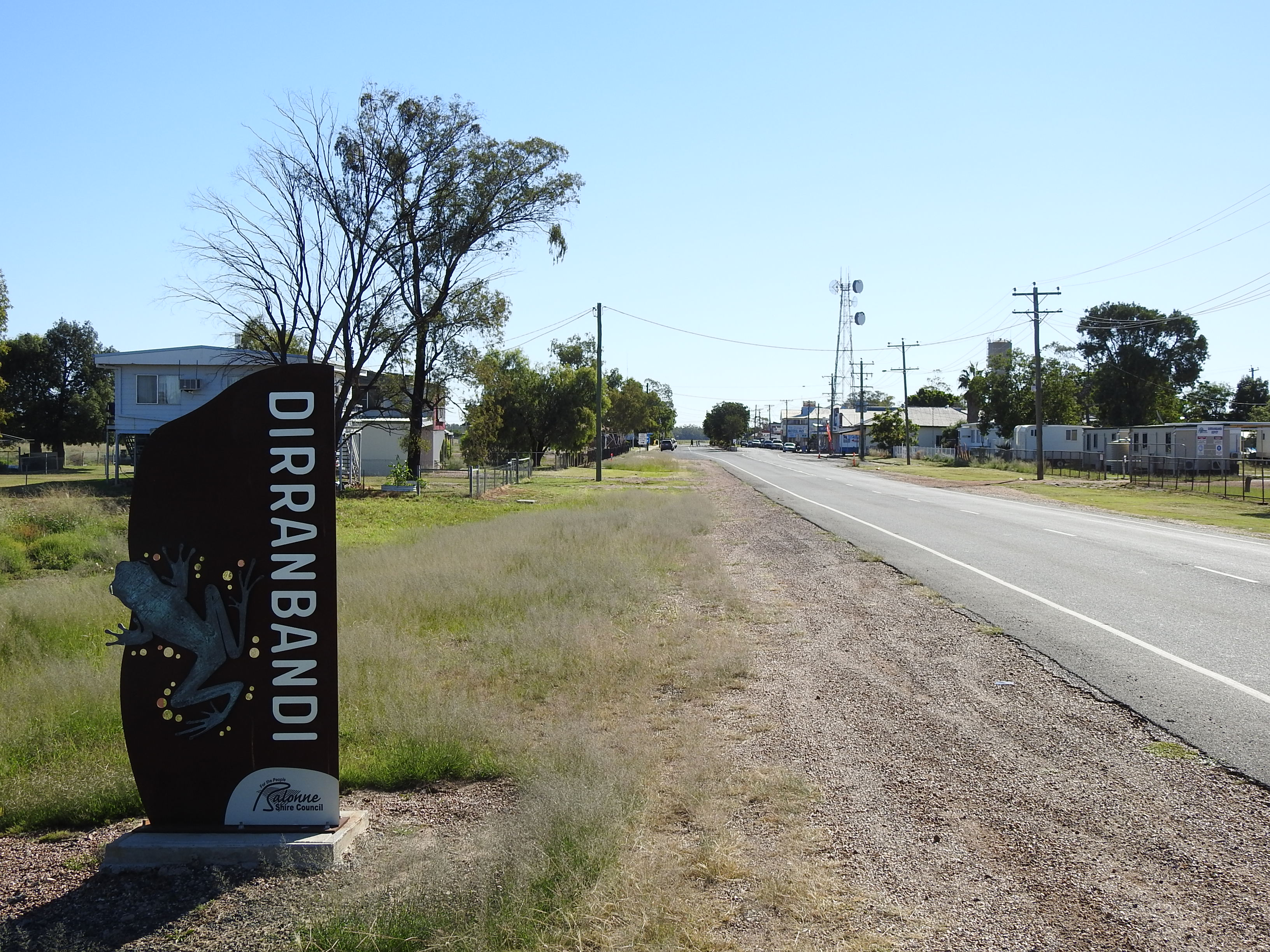
Town sign (2021).

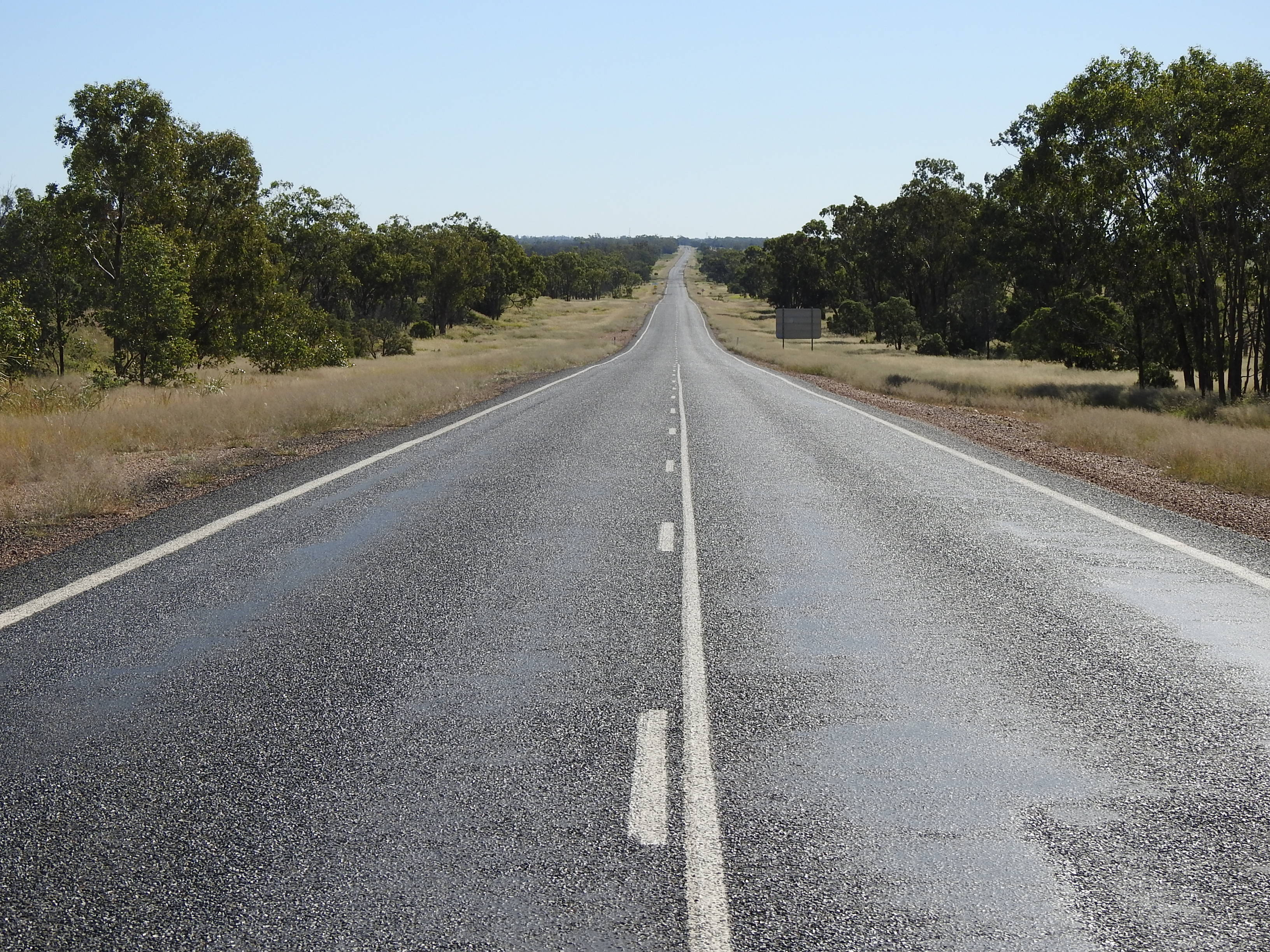
Castlereagh Highway to the eastern approach, Noondoo (2021).

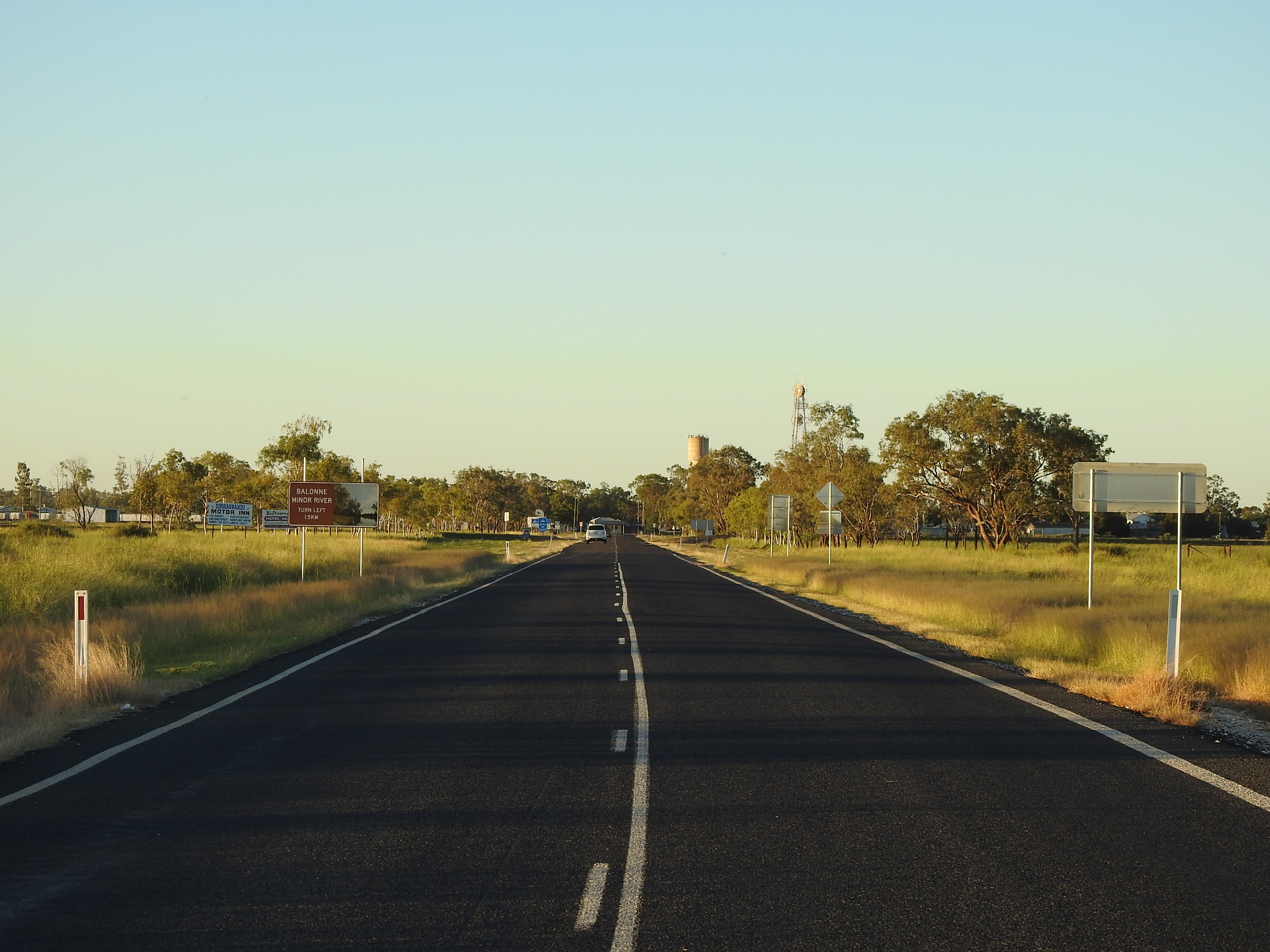
Southern approach to town (2021).

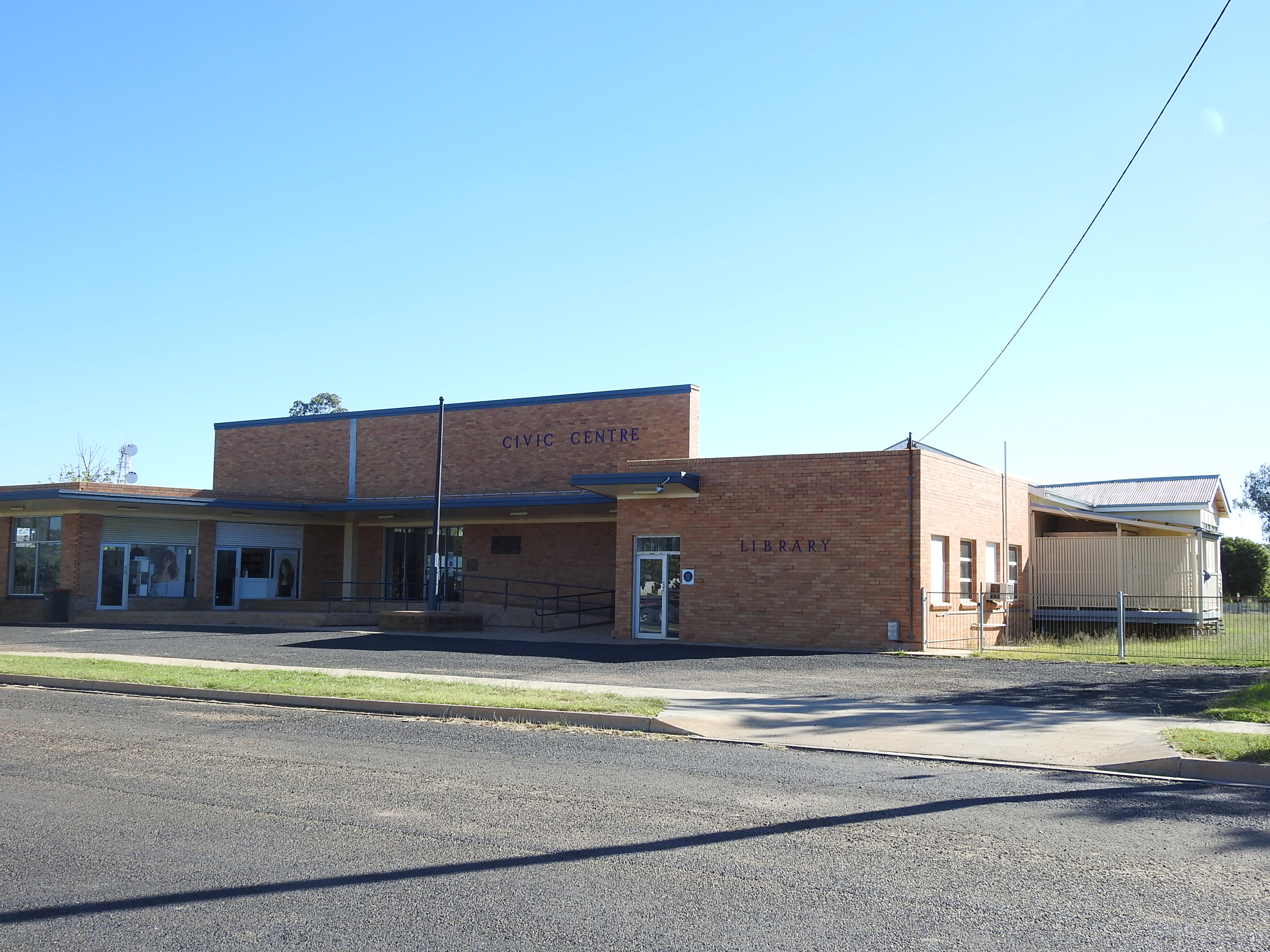
Civic Centre and library, Kirby Street (2021).

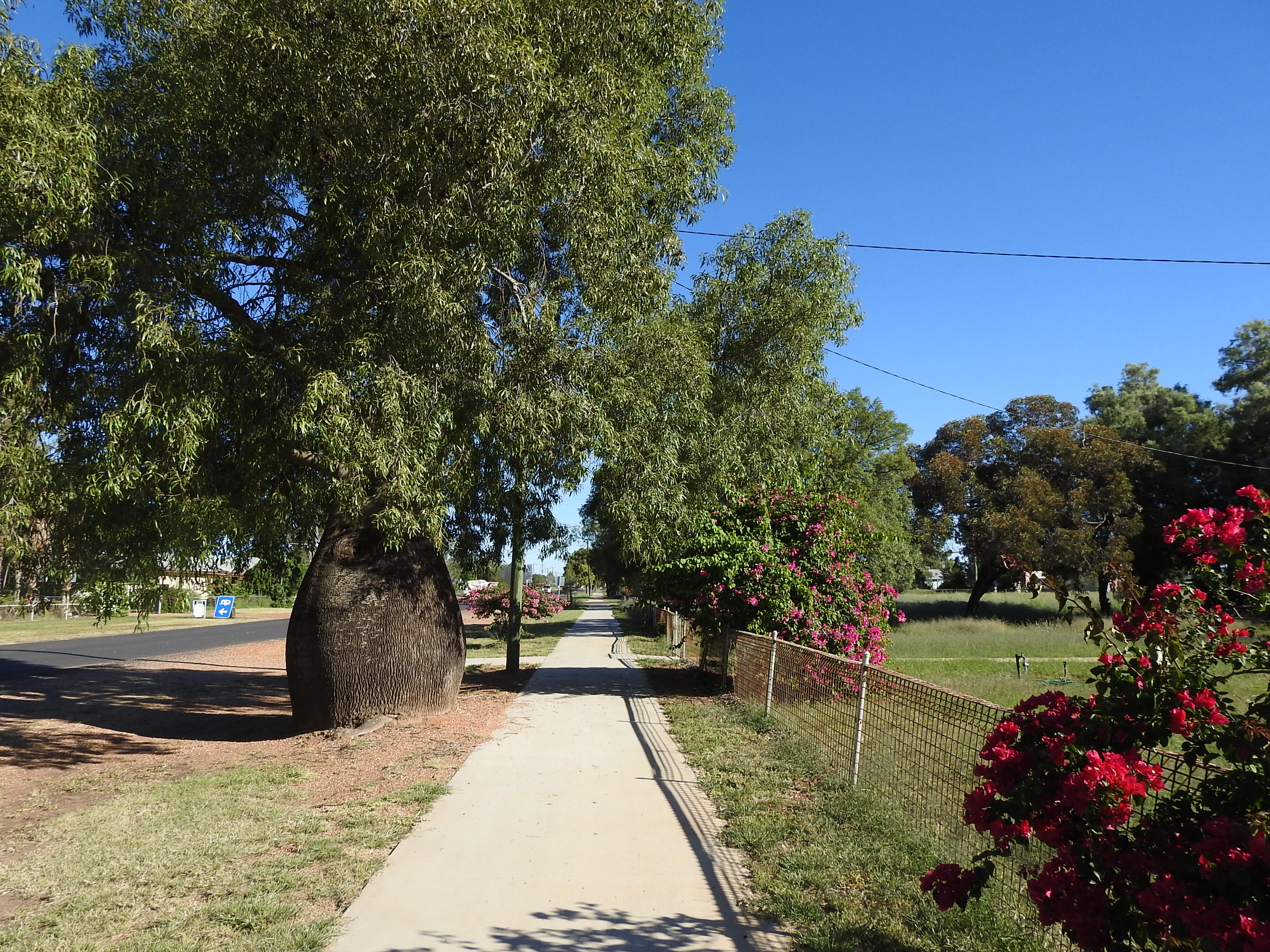
Footpath along Kirby Street (2021).

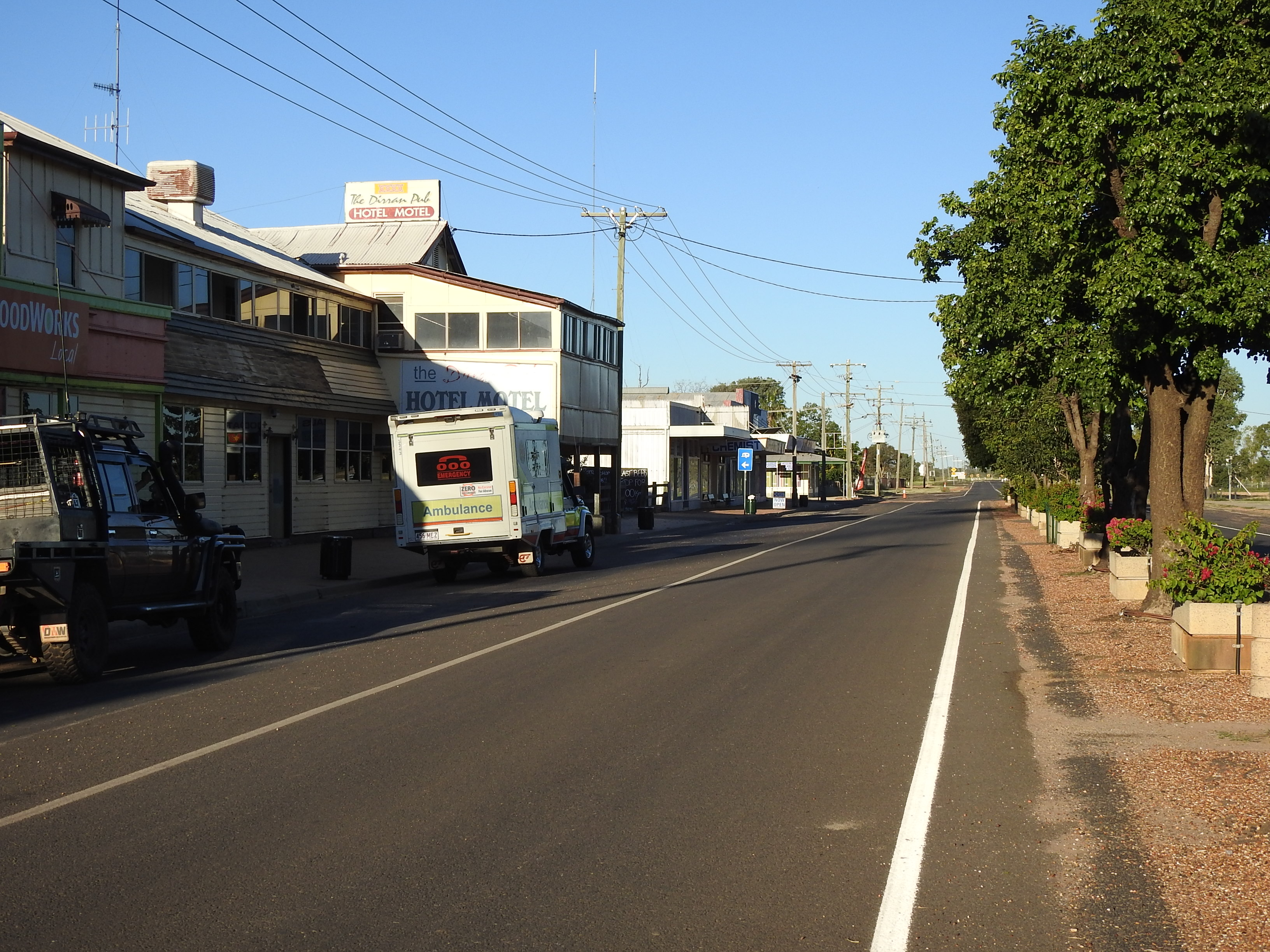
Railway Street main street (2021).

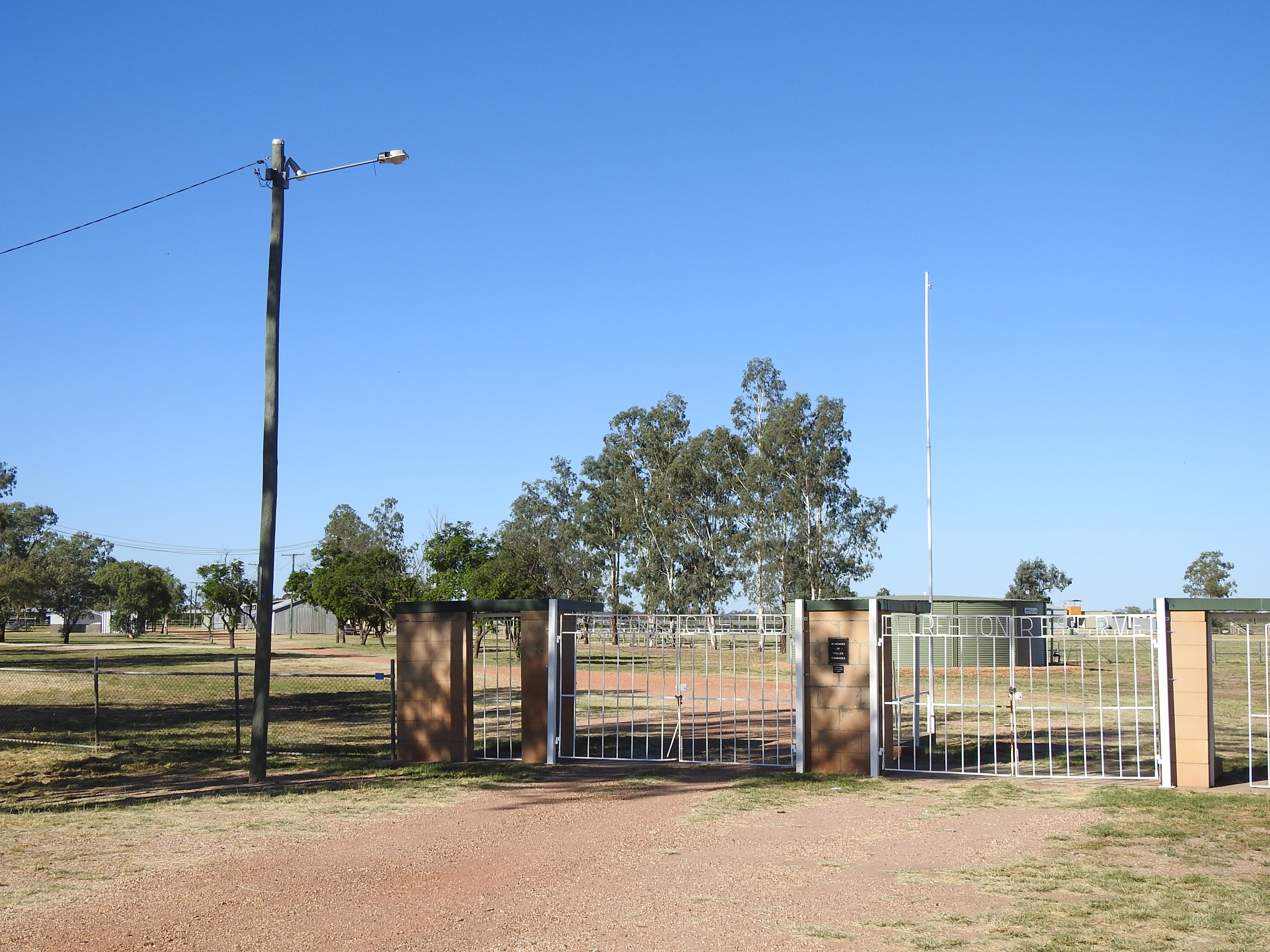
Entrance to the show grounds, Kirby Street (2021).

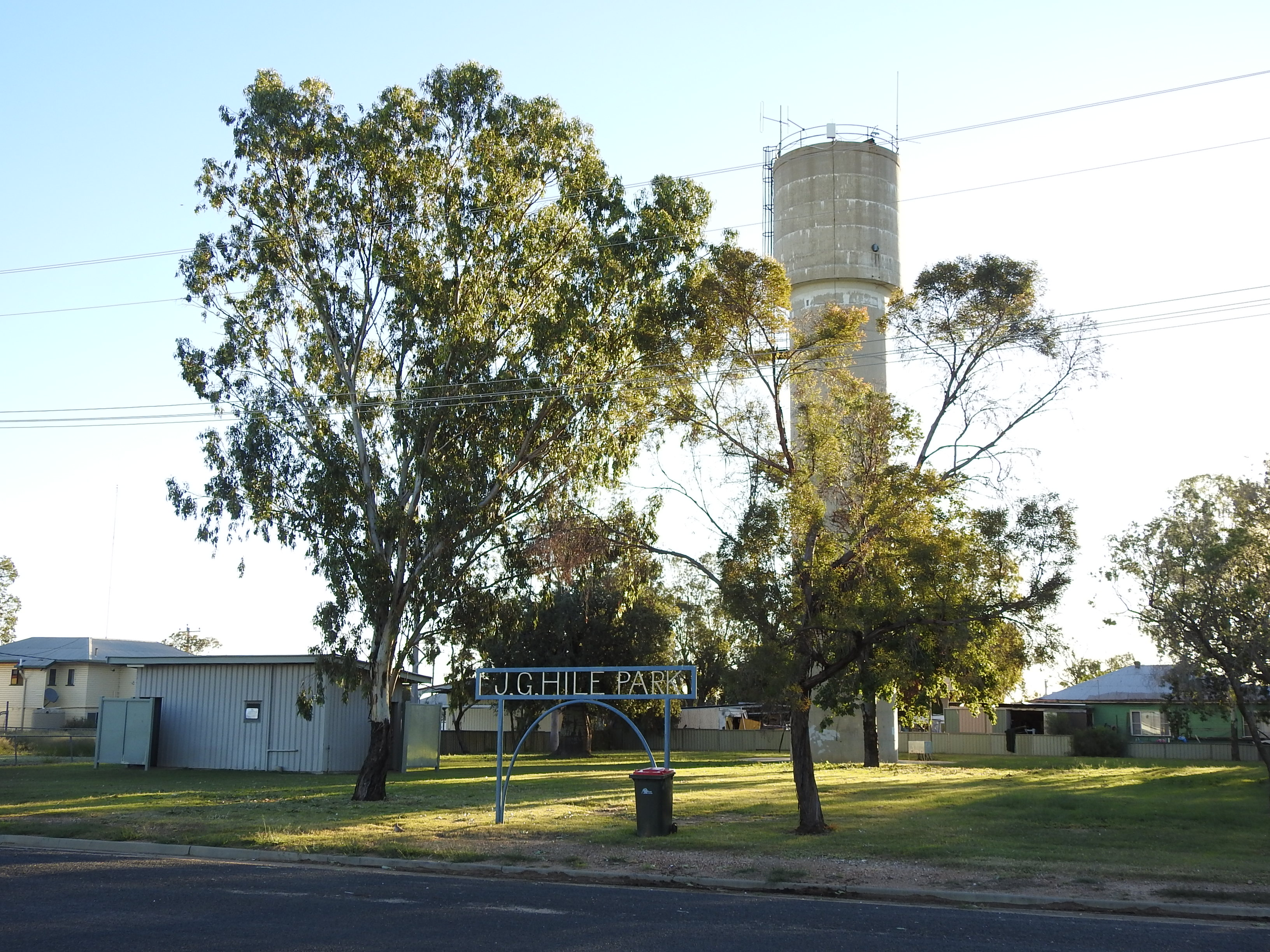
J G Hile Park, and water tower, Richardson Street (2021).

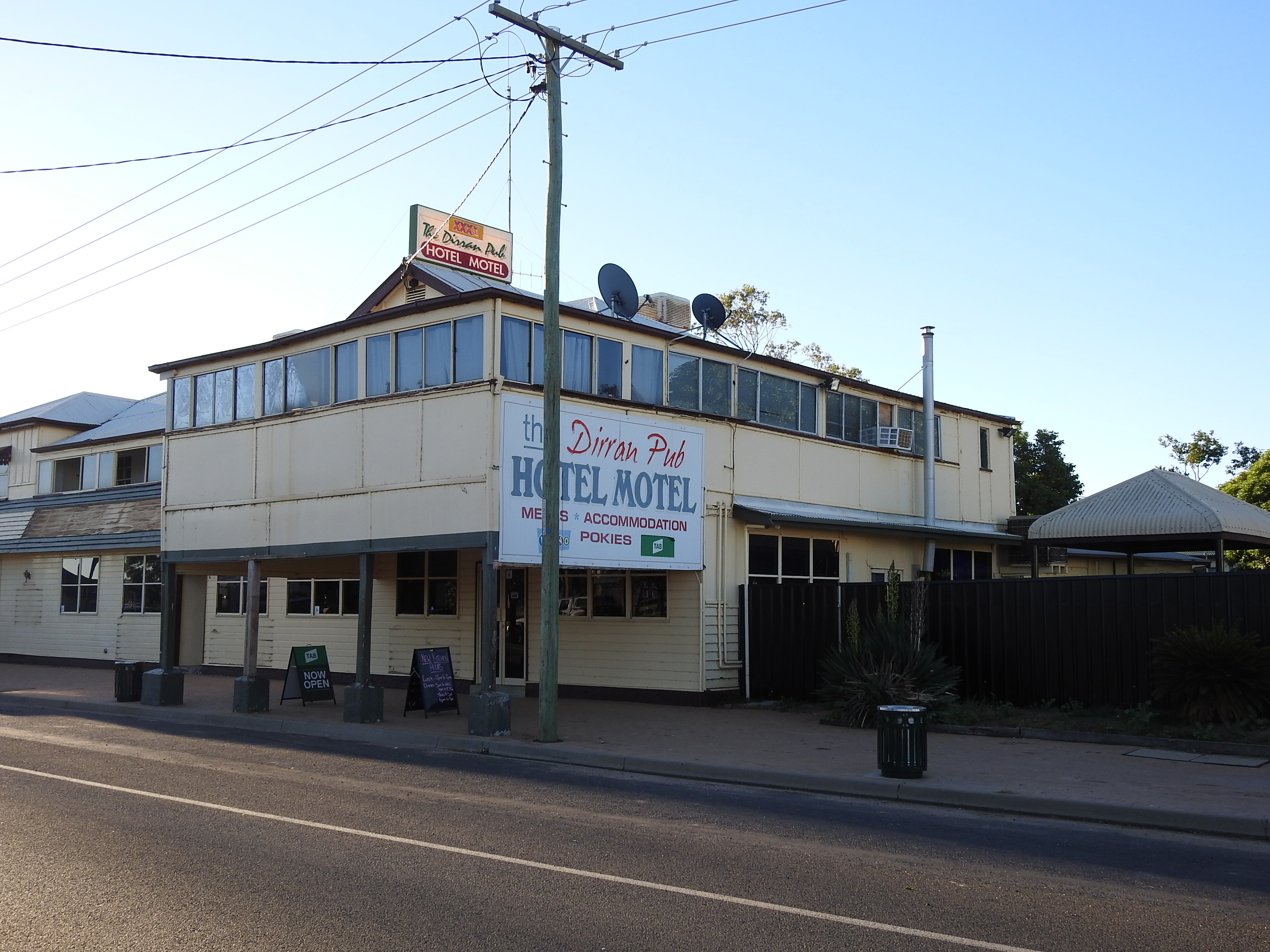
Dirran Pub public hotel motel (2021).

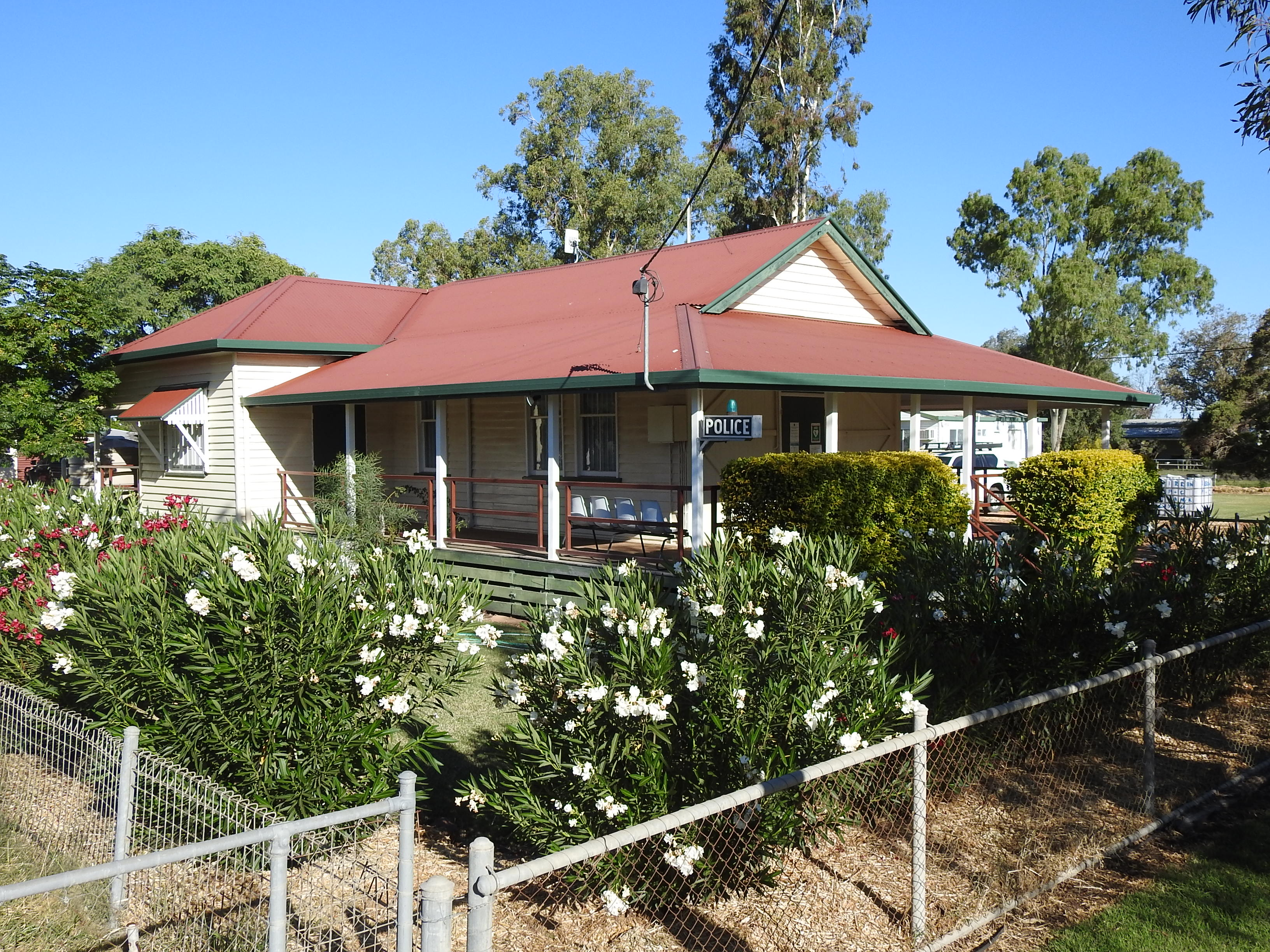
Queensland Police Service police station, Kirby Street (2021).

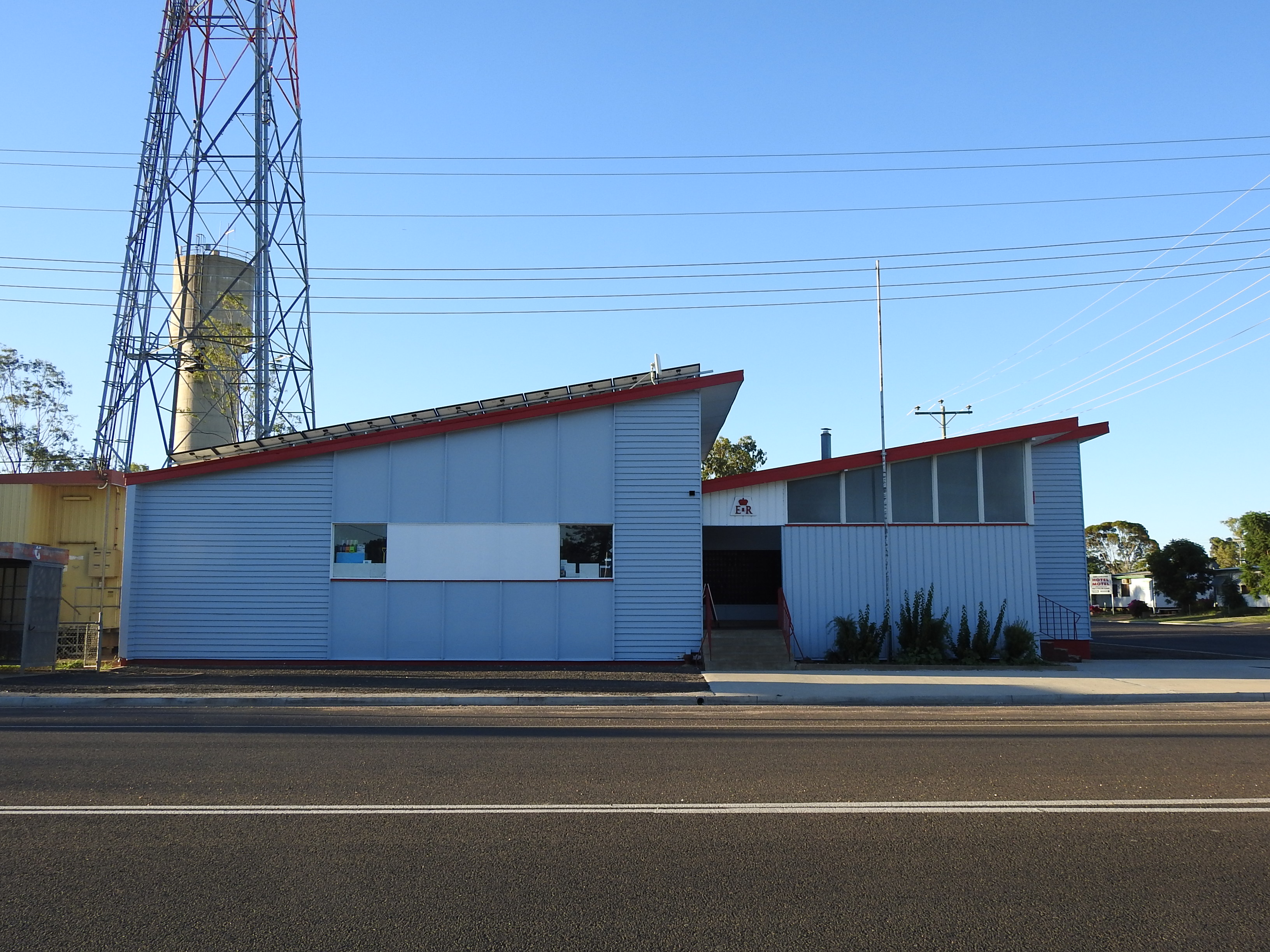
Australia Post Office, Railway and Richardson Streets (2021).

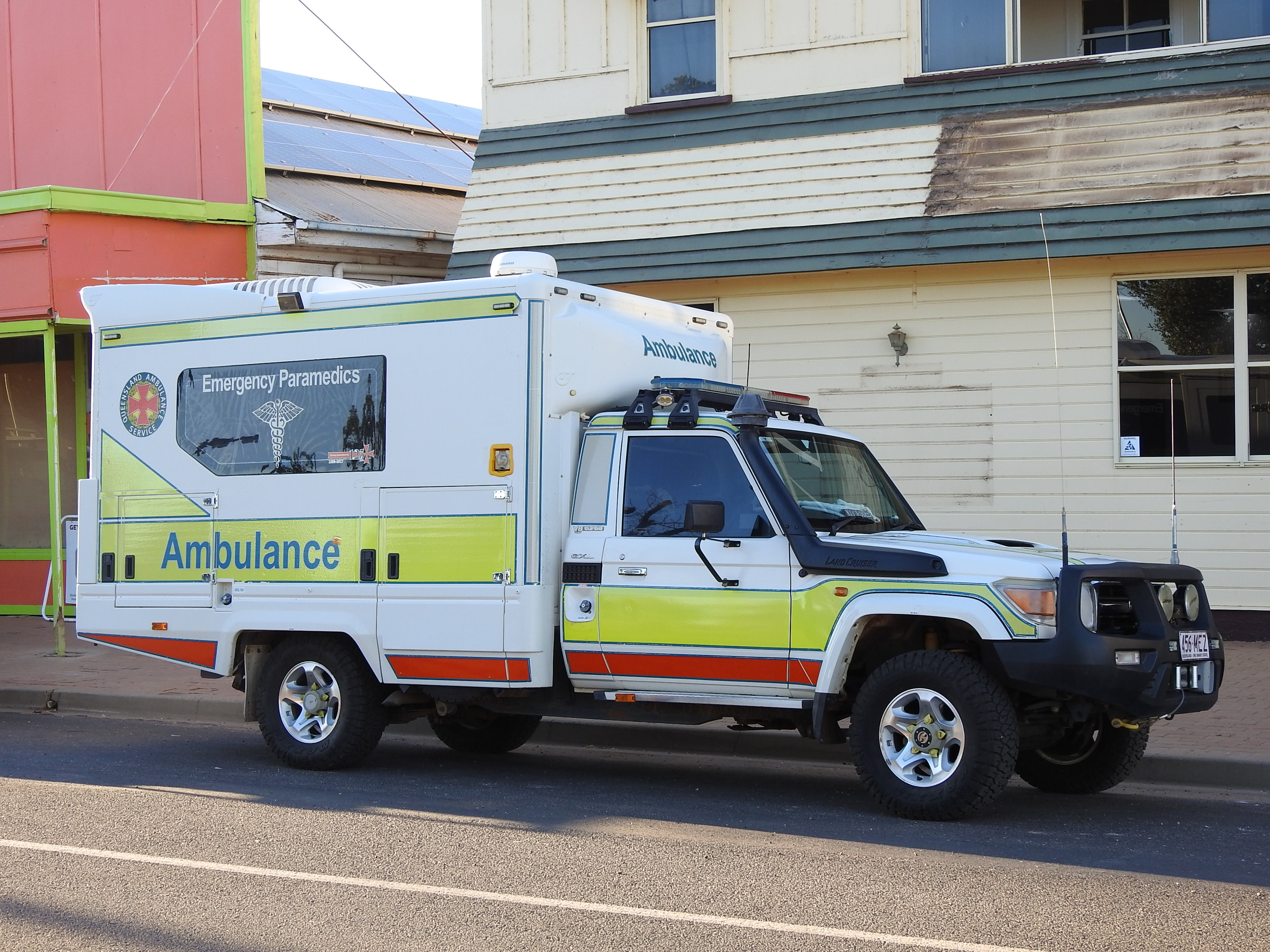
Queensland Ambulance Service ambulance, Toyota Land Cruiser (2021).

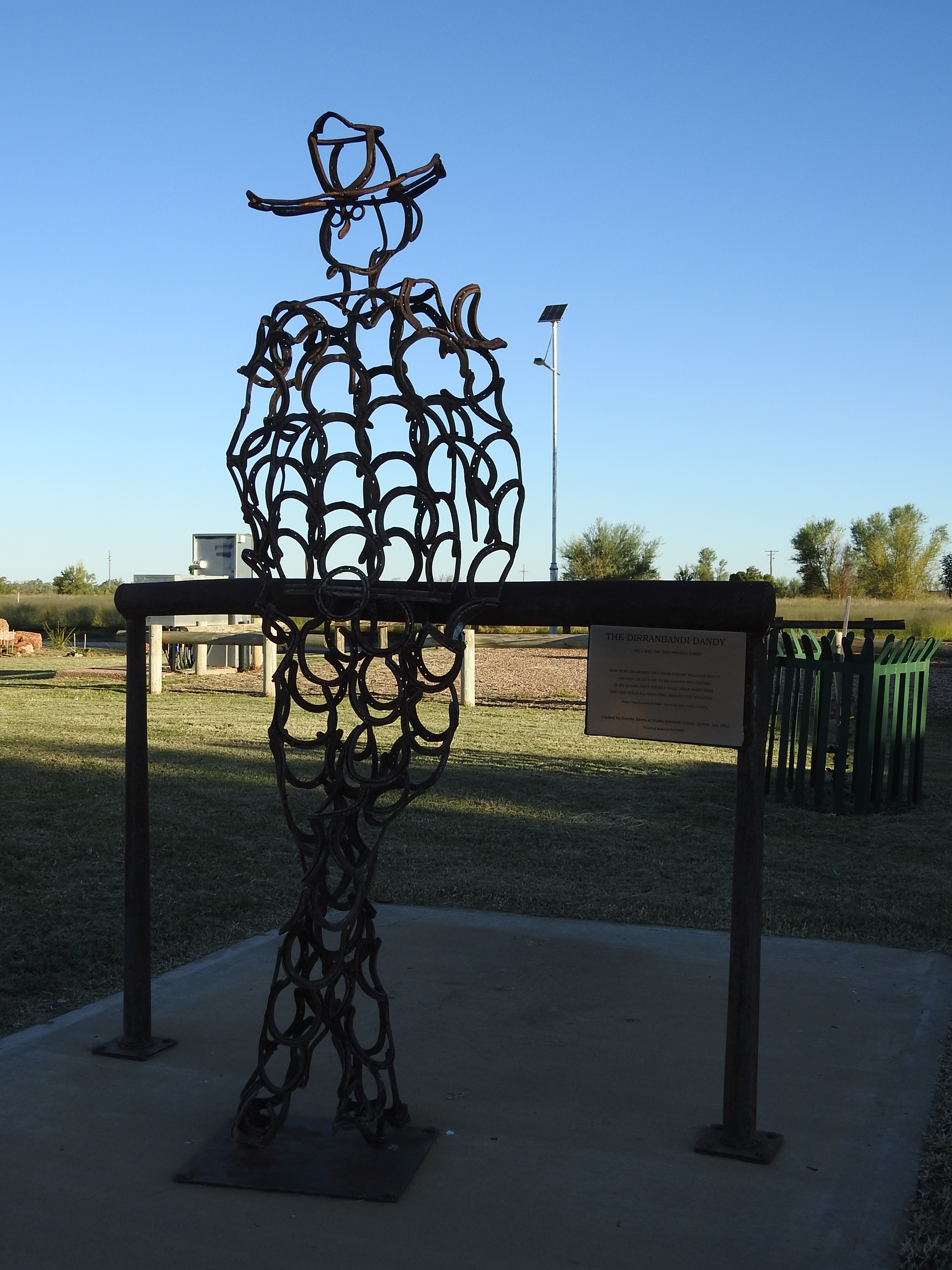
Artwork of the Dirranbandi Dandy, Railway Street Park (2021).

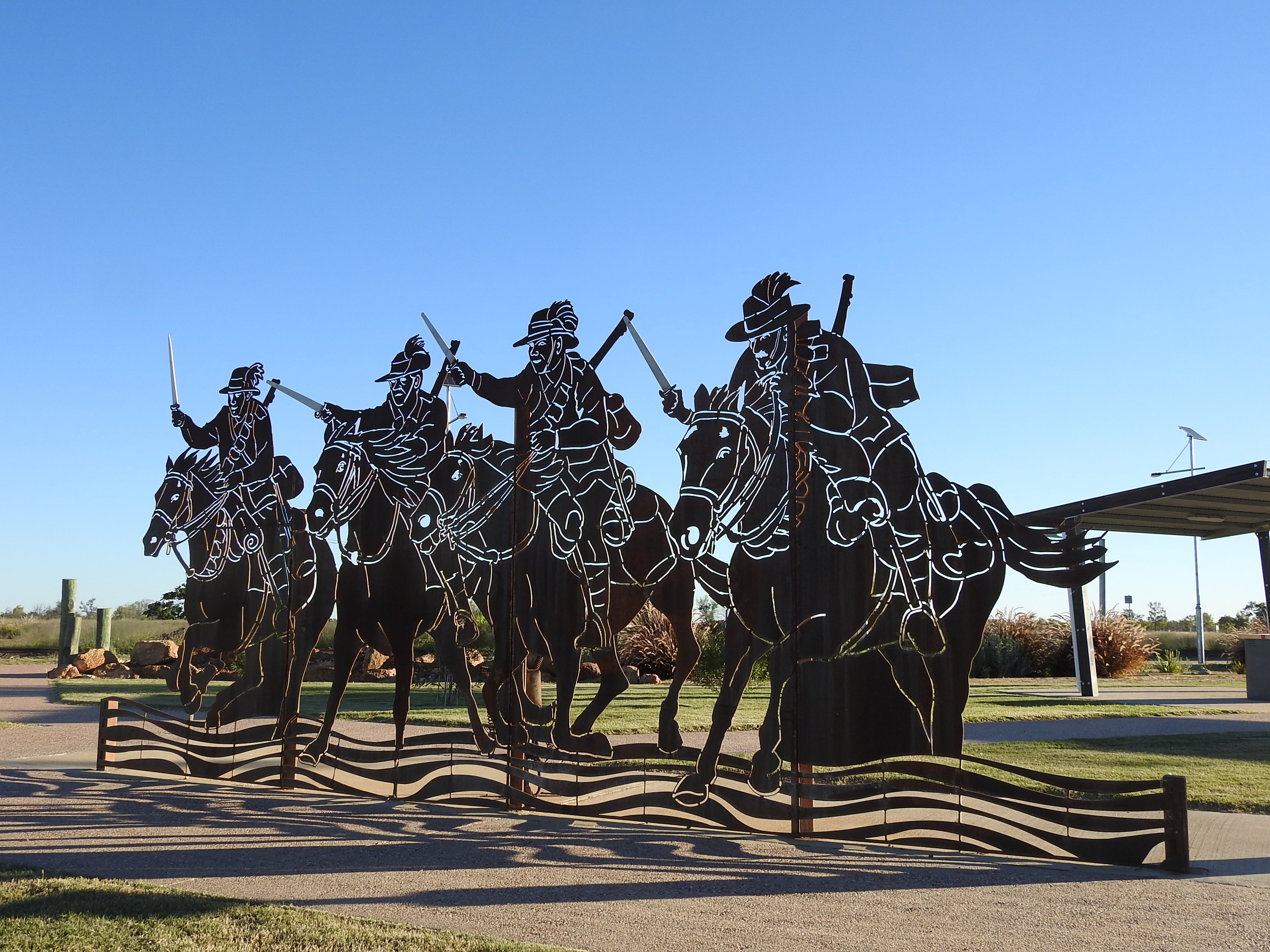
Artwork of the Australian Light Horse (Beersheba Memorial), Railway Street Park (2021).

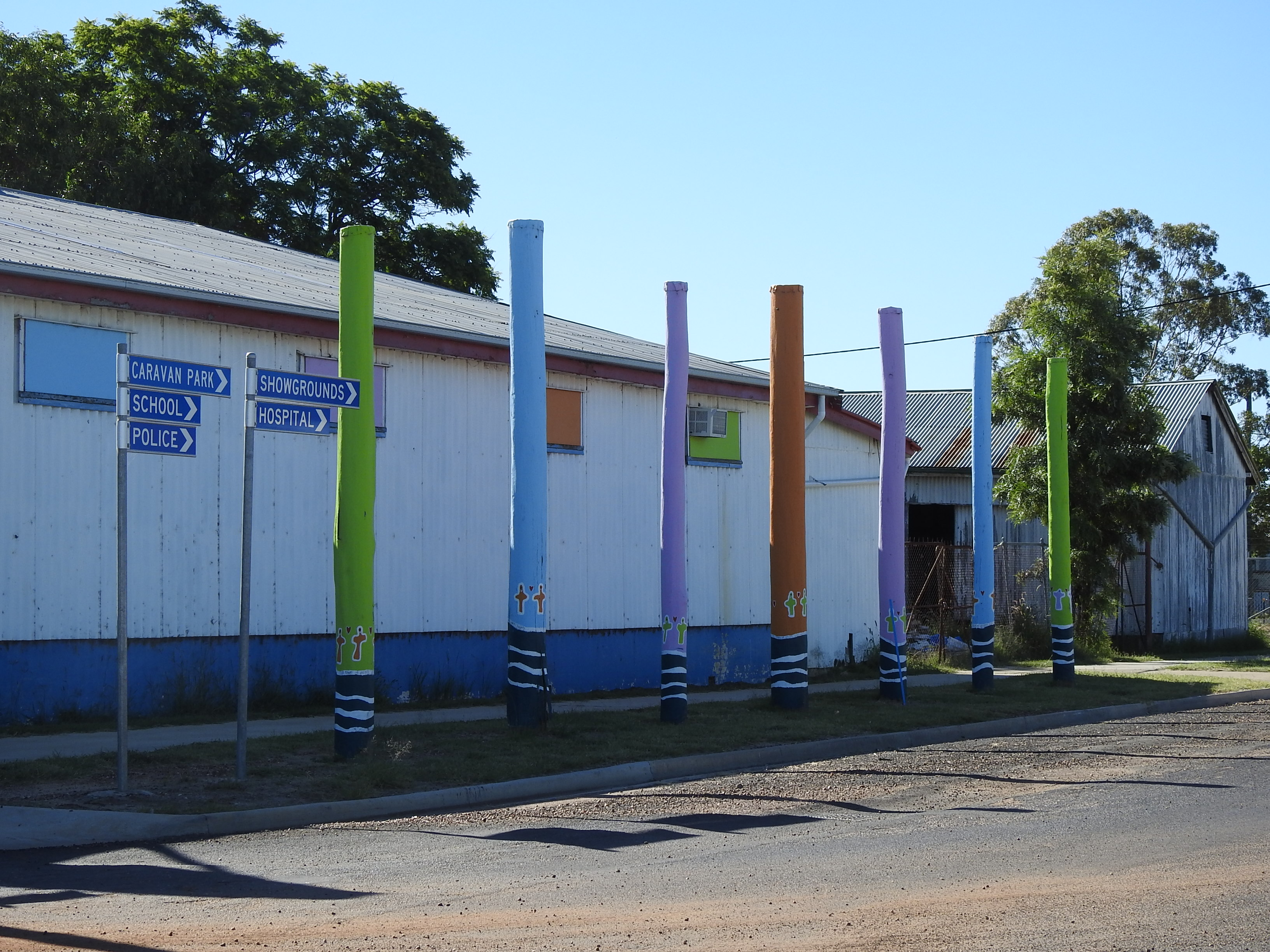
Painted posts on Kirby Street (2021).

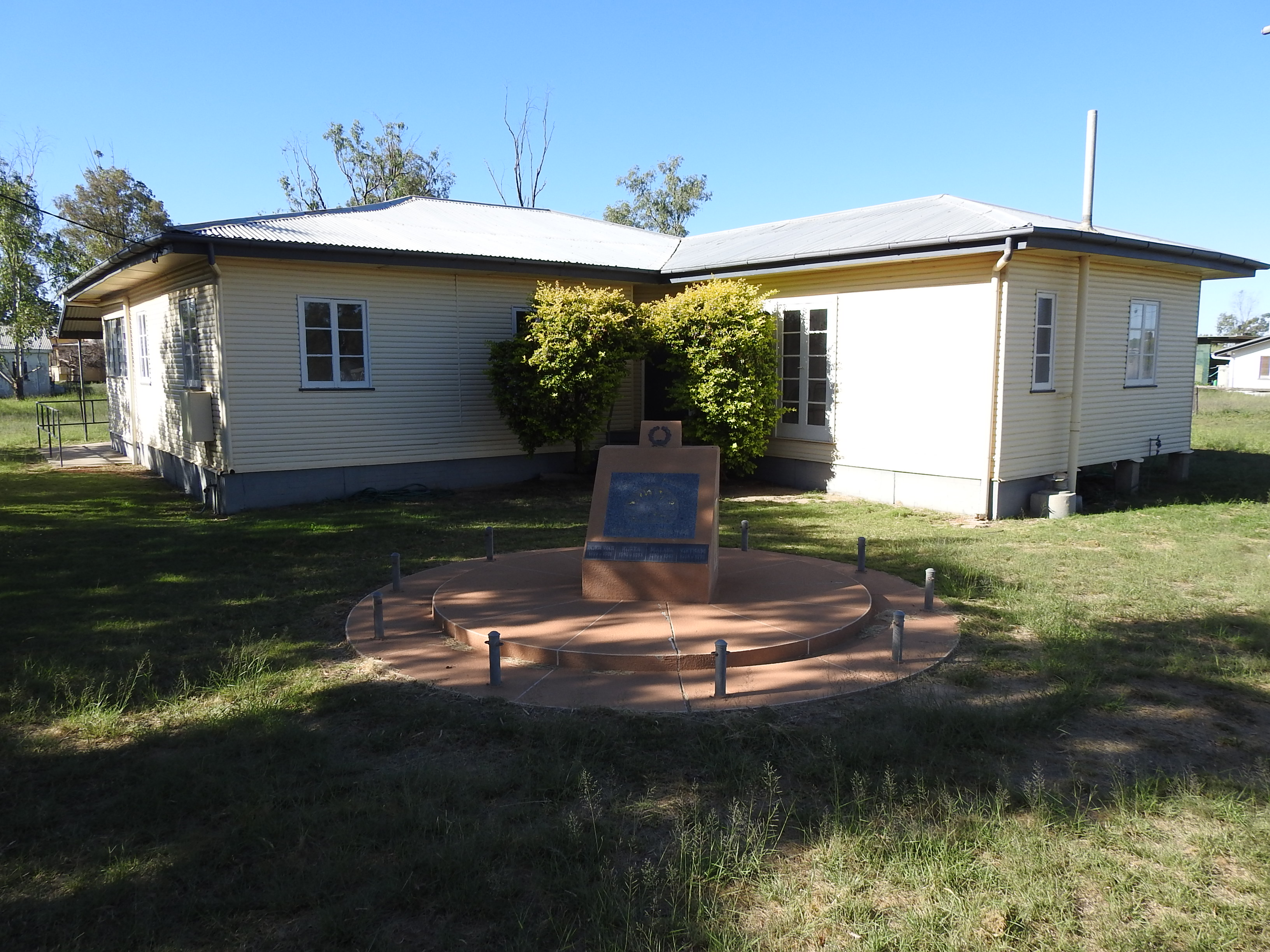
War memorial, Kirby Street (2021).

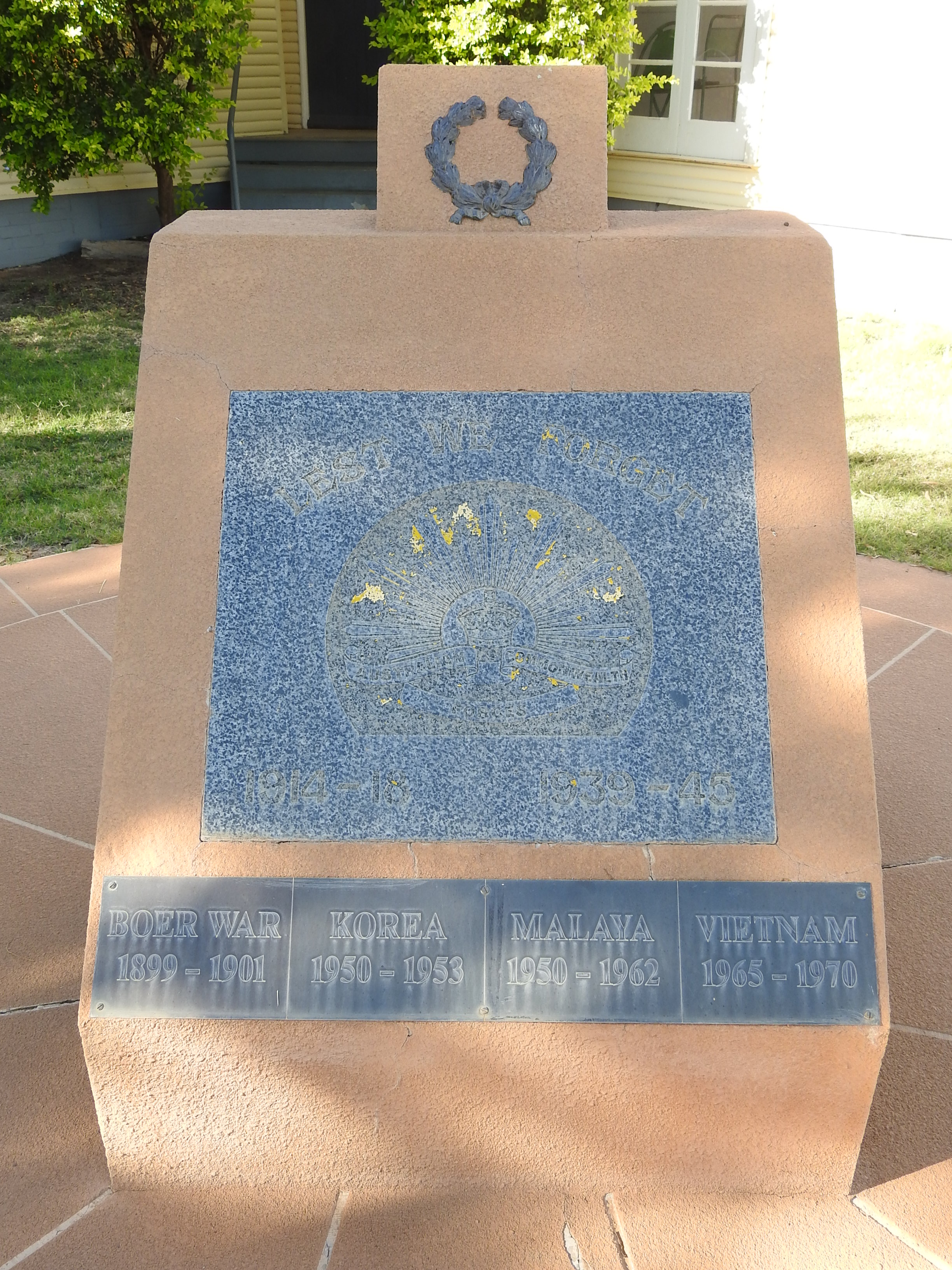
War memorial, Kirby Street (2021).

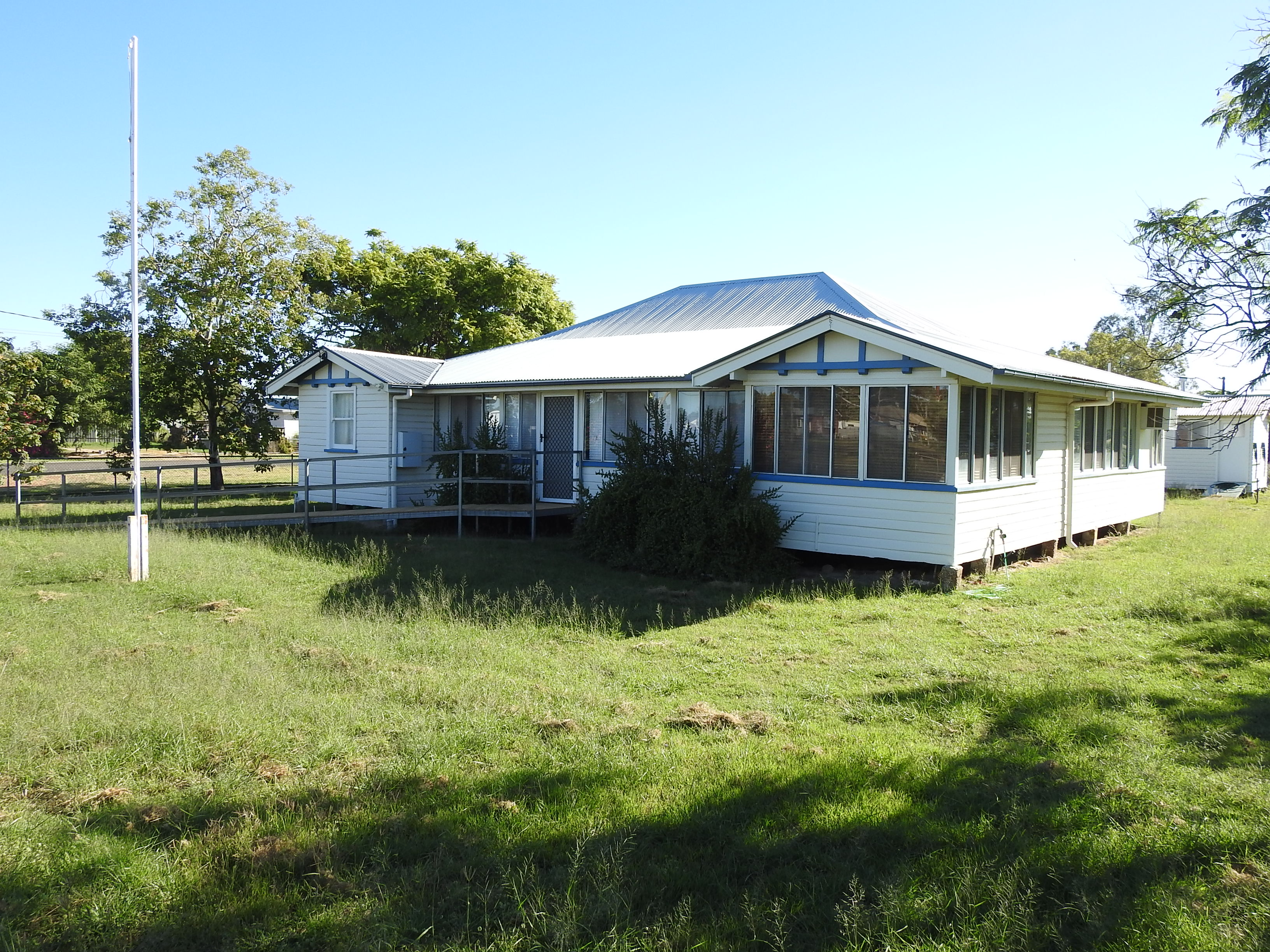
Queensland Country Women's Association rest room, Kirby Street (2021).

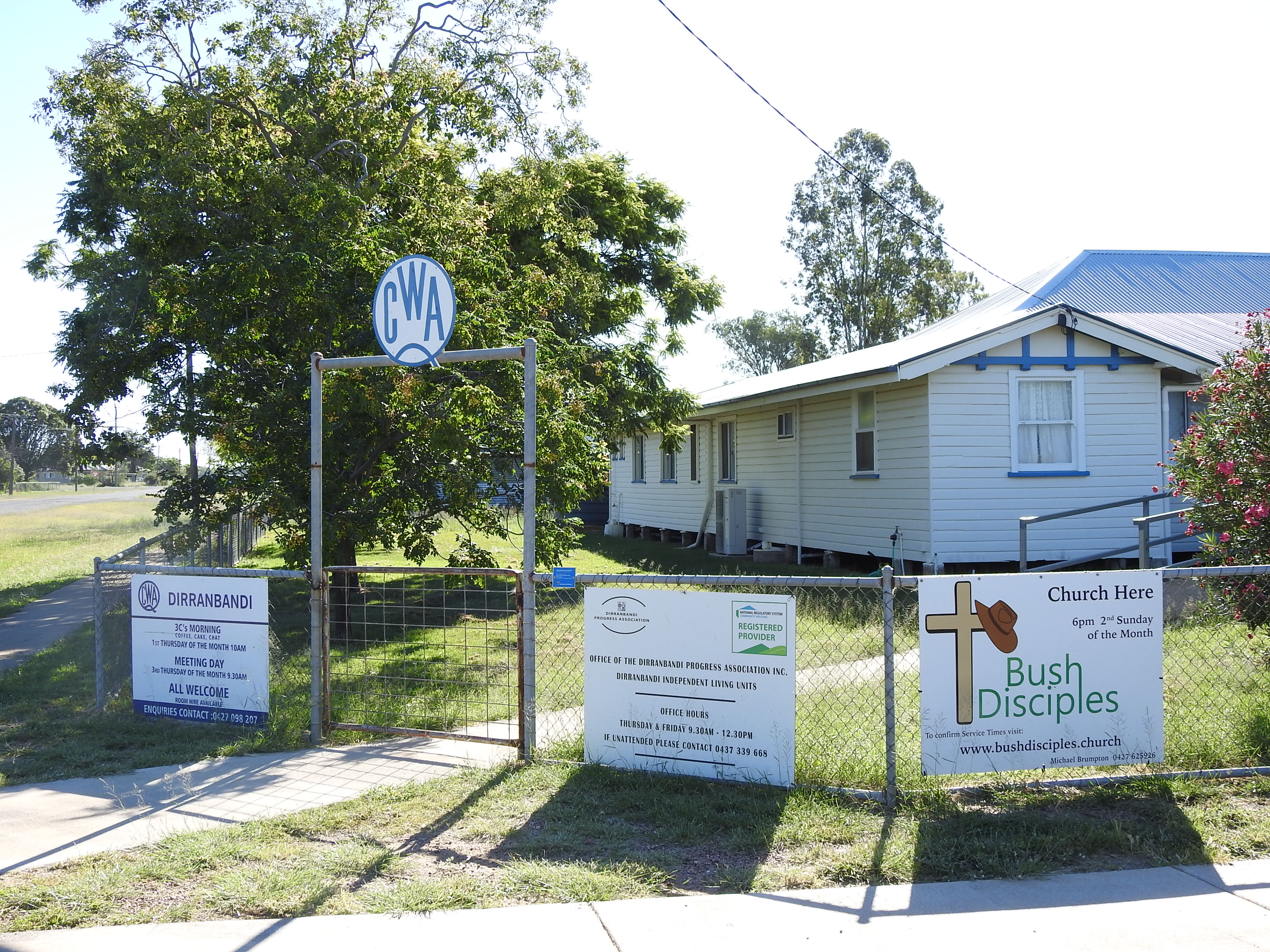
Queensland Country Women's Association rest room, Kirby Street (2021).

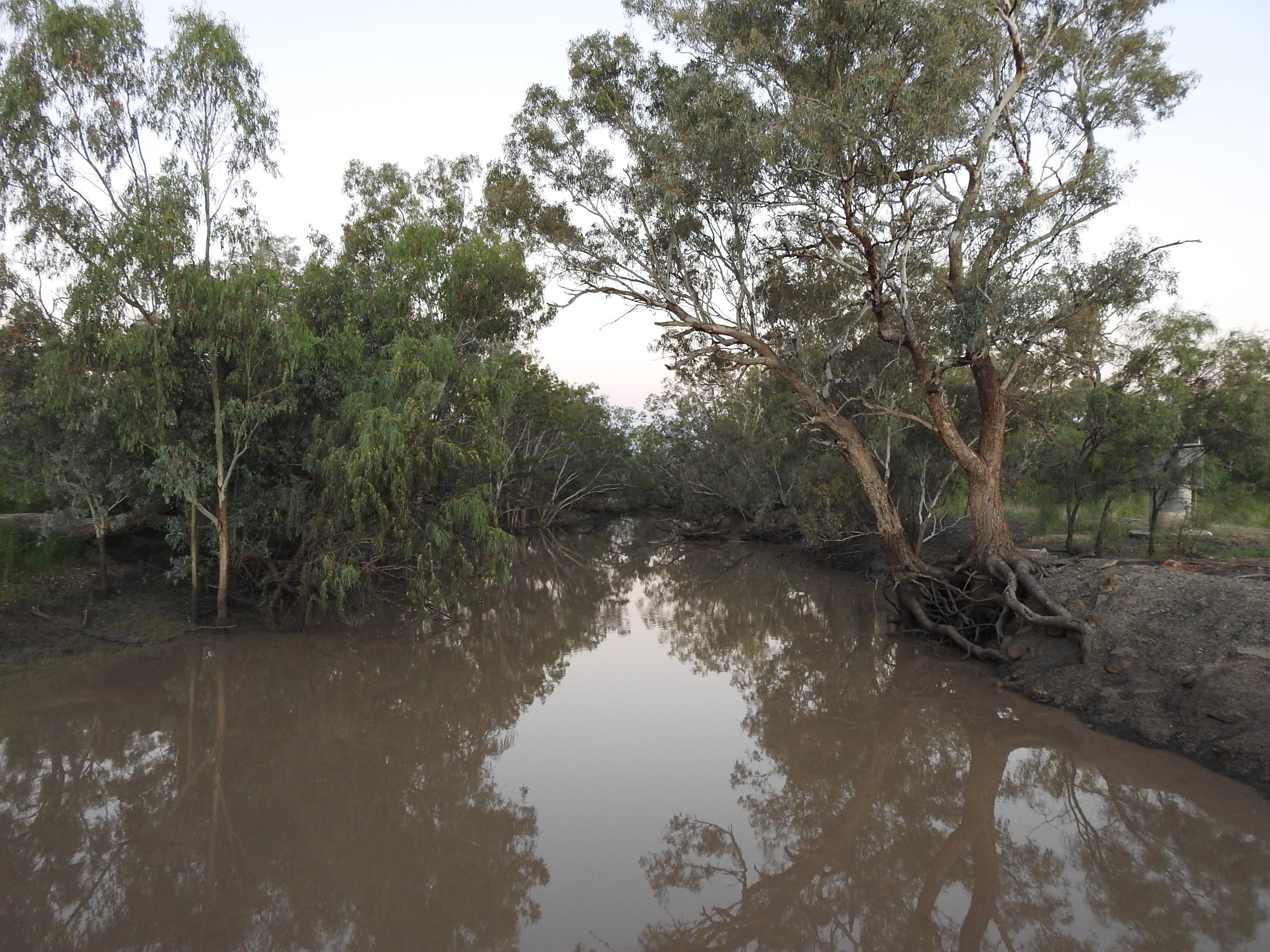
Narran River before Minnum Road, south of Dirranbandi (2021).
