= Puram =

Classic poetry genre

Puram (Tamil: புறம், puṟam, Lit. exterior) is one of two genres of Classical Tamil poetry. The concept of the lifestyle of human beings falls in two categories: personal and public. The genre dealing with poems about love affairs is called Akam (அகம்), while Puram concerns many subjects including wars, kings, poets and personal virtues.

Tolkāppiyam, the earliest work of Tamil grammar and literature available in Tamil, divides each genre into seven strands (Thinai), comparing and connecting the two categories of lifestyle.

Works in the Puram genre reflect on different people's lifestyles, especially that of kings. The works identify personal names, unlike in the Akam genre. Because they include the names of kings, poets, and places, Tamil literary scholars consider them a historical record.

== See also ==
- Sangam literature
