= Alton, Queensland =

Alton Queensland
- Coordinates: 27.9822°S 149.3094°E
- Postcode(s): 4487
- Time zone: AEST (UTC+10:00)
- Location: 75.9 km (47 mi) E of St George; 309 km (192 mi) WSW of Toowoomba; 420 km (261 mi) WSW of Brisbane
- LGA(s): Shire of Balonne
- State electorate(s): Warrego
- Federal division(s): Maranoa

Alton is a town within the locality of St George in the Shire of Balonne, Queensland, Australia. As at 2018, it is completely covered in bushland and there are no buildings or evidence of the roads shown on the town map.

== Geography ==
Alton is located to the south of the Moonie River and north of the Moonie Highway. The Alton National Park is to the south-east of the town.

== History ==
Alton first appears on an 1883 survey plan. In March 1884 town and suburban lots in Alton were offered for sale, described as on the Moonie River and 46 miles (74 km) east of St George. In January 1885, the Queensland Government gazetted a camping reserve to the west of the town.

As at October 2018, there is no evidence that any development occurred in the town.
