= Ulla (disambiguation) =

Ulla is a feminine given name.

Ulla may also refer to:

== Places ==
- Ulla, a part of Nohra, a municipality in Thuringia, Germany
- Ulla, a small fishing community on the island of Haramsøya, Norway
- Ullà, Catalonia, Spain, a village
- Úlla, Irish name for Oola, a village in County Limerick, Ireland
- Ulla River, Galicia, Spain
- Ulla River (Belarus), a left tributary of River Daugava, Belarus
- Mount Ulla, a peak in the Asgard mountain range, Antarctica
- 909 Ulla, an asteroid

== Other uses ==
- Ulla (instrument), a traditional Korean percussion instrument
- The cry of the Martians in The War of the Worlds and its adaptations
- Ulla (Talmudist), a 3rd-4th century rabbi
- "Ulla", a song by Goldfrapp from Tales of Us

== See also ==
- Ulla Ulla National Reserve in Bolivia
