= HNoMS Ula =

Three submarines of the Royal Norwegian Navy have borne the name HNoMS Ula, after the village of Ula in Norway.

- HNoMS Ula (1943) was a U-class submarine launched in 1943 and scrapped in 1965.
- HNoMS Ula (1964) was a Kobben-class submarine launched in 1964, and scrapped in 1998.
- HNoMS Ula (1988) is an Ula-class submarine launched in 1988.
