= Akam (poetry) =

Genre of poetry

Akam (Tamil: அகம், akam) is one of two genres of Classical Tamil poetry that concerns with the subject of love, the other (puṟam) concerns the subject of war. It can also be translated as love and heroism. It is further subdivided into the five thinai. The type of love was divided into seven ranging from unrequited love to mismatched love.

== History ==
Initially an oral tradition, 400 early Akam dating to the 1st century BCE to 2nd century CE were first compiled in the third century into an anthology known as Akananuru. Each poem was in aciriyam meter consisting of 13 to 31 lines. Some of the poems were contemporary for the time, and historians have suggested the poems were written as a means of preserving the tradition in the face of rising literacy among the elite, and the simultaneous decline of power among tribal leaders.

As power shifted away from Jain and Buddhist chieftains to Hindu ones, poems began to be contextualized and appropriated, including Akam poetry, which increasingly included the names of Hindu gods and even began to cast Buddhist and Jain saints negatively, or included commentaries that recontextualized their presence.

== Themes ==
=== Natural world ===
Akam poetry typically explains the background of the lovers' story around three concepts: time and place (mudal), natural setting (karu) and their actions (uri). The poems often rely on these natural settings as metaphors for the lovers' actions, blending seasonal changes, the external natural features, and interior states. The concept of place and emotion were also connected, with poets drawing on a set of symbols from a specific regions' "gods, food, fauna, flora, music" and other local landmarks or symbols of the region. Murali has suggested that this is can be interpreted as an early poetic for the "ecosystem" concept.

Landscape	தினை	Concept
kuṟiñci	குறிஞ்சி	Sexual union
Mullai	முல்லை	Yearning
marutam	மருதம்	Sulking
neital	நெய்தல்	Pining
pālai	பாலை	Separation

=== The playmate ===
As poems concerning courtship, they often relied on an intermediary figure, "the playmate," to cultivate the relationship or serve as an early go-between amongst the woman and her suitor. Often a maid or servant of the love interest, the playmate's role grants her greater freedom of movement, which she uses to arrange trysts between lovers and to advance their relationship toward marriage.

== See also ==
- Sangam Literature
- Sangam
