= Tinai =

Mode or theme in Tamil poetics

In Tamil poetics, tinai (Tamil: திணை tiṇai "land", "genre", "type") is a type of poetical mode or theme. A thinai consists of a complete poetical landscape - a definite time, place, season in which the poem is set - and background elements characteristic of that landscape - including flora and fauna, inhabitants, deities and social organisation. These collectively provide imagery for extended poetic metaphors ("ullurai", literally "inner meaning"), which set the mood of the poem.

Classical authors recognised two broad categories of tinai. Akam tinai (literally, "the inner genre") consisted of modes used in love poetry, associated with specific aspects of a relationship or specific stages in the development of a relationship. Puram tinai (literally, "the outer genre") consisted of modes that corresponded closely to the akam modes, but were used in heroic, philosophical and moral poetry, to describe the stages of a battle or particular patterns of thought. Later commentators added further categories, such as akappuram, which consisted of modes that mixed elements of akam and puram poetry, and purappuram, which consisted of modes used for peripheral puram themes. The five tinais were kurinji (hilly/mountain region), palai ( parched/dry lands), mullai (pastoral tract), marutam (wet/ agricultural lands) and neital (coastal area). Recent literary studies on tinai gave birth to tinai poetics, the native Indian theory similar to ecocriticism, which is based on the tinai concept of Classical Tamil Literature.

== See also ==
- Sangam Literature
- Sangam

== Sources ==
- Buck, David C.; Paramasivam, K. (1997), The Study of Stolen Love: A translation of Kalaviyal enra Iraiyanar Akapporul with Commentary by Nakkiranar, Atlanta: Scholars Press, ISBN 0-7885-0331-6
- Ilakkuvanar, S. (1963), Tolkappiyam in English with Critical Studies, Madurai: Kural Neri Publishing
- Mariaselvam, Abraham (1988), The Song of Songs and Ancient Tamil Love Poems: Poetry and Symbolism, Rome: Pontificium Institutum Biblicum, ISBN 88-7653-118-1
- Marr, John Ralston (1985), The Eight Anthologies, Madras: Institute of Asian Studies
- Nadarajah, Devapoopathy (1994), Love in Sanskrit and Tamil Literature, Delhi: Motilal Banarasidass, ISBN 81-208-1215-8
- Ramanujan, A.K. (1985), Poems of Love and War from the Eight Anthologies and the Ten Long Poems of Classical Tamil, UNESCO Collection of Representative Works, New York: Columbia University Press, ISBN 0-231-05106-9
- Selby, Martha Ann (2000), Grow Long, Blessed Night: Love Poems from Classical India, New York: Oxford University Press, ISBN 0-19-512734-X
- Takahashi, Takanobu (1995), Tamil Love Poetry and Poetics, Leiden: E.J. Brill, ISBN 9789004100428
- Zvelebil, Kamil (1973b), The Smile of Murugan: On Tamil Literature of South India, Leiden: E.J. Brill, ISBN 90-04-03591-5
- "Tinaipoetics: An Ecopoetics of South India". K. Kaviarasu, Literary Association of Nepal, Volume 30, March 2017.
