= Shire of Balonne =

Coordinates: 28°02′14″S 148°34′28″E

- Local government area
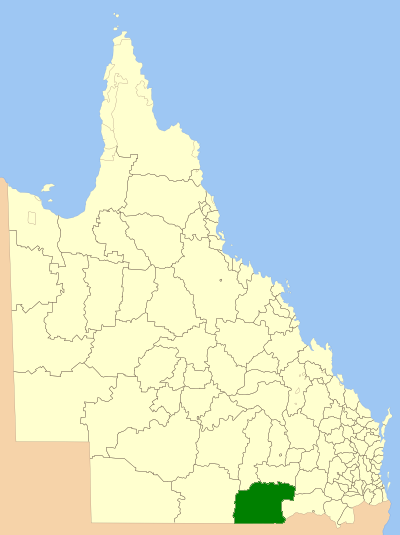
- Location within Queensland

- Interactive map of Shire of Balonne
- Country: Australia
- State: Queensland
- Region: Maranoa
- Established: 1879
- Council seat: St George

Government
  - Mayor: Samantha Cathleen O'Toole
  - State electorate: Warrego
  - Federal division: Division of Maranoa

Area
  - Total: 31,104 km^{2} (12,009 sq mi)

Population
  - Total: 4,320 (2021 census)
  - Density: 0.13889/km^{2} (0.3597/sq mi)
- Website: Shire of Balonne
LGAs around Shire of Balonne
Maranoa	Maranoa	Western Downs
Paroo	Shire of Balonne	Goondiwindi
Brewarrina (NSW)	Walgett (NSW)	Moree Plains (NSW)

The Shire of Balonne is a local government area in South West Queensland, Australia, over 500 kilometres (310 mi) from the state capital, Brisbane. It covers an area of 31,104 square kilometres (12,009.3 sq mi), and has existed as a local government entity since 1879. It is headquartered in its main town, St George.

In the 2021 census, the Shire of Balonne had a population of 4,320 people.

== History ==
Kamilaroi (also known as Gamilaroi, Gamilaraay, Comilroy) is an Australian Aboriginal language of South-West Queensland. It is closely related to Yuwaalaraay and Yuwaalayaay. The Kamilaroi language region includes the local government area of the Shire of Balonne, including the towns of Dirranbandi, Thallon, Talwood and Bungunya as well as the border towns of Mungindi and Boomi extending to Moree, Tamworth and Coonabarabran in New South Wales.

Yuwaalaraay (also known as Yuwalyai, Euahlayi, Yuwaaliyaay, Gamilaraay, Kamilaroi, Yuwaaliyaayi) is an Australian Aboriginal language spoken on Yuwaalaraay country. The Yuwaalaraay language region includes the landscape within the local government boundaries of the Shire of Balonne, including the town of Dirranbandi as well as the border town of Hebel extending to Walgett and Collarenebri in New South Wales.

Yuwaalayaay (also known as Yuwalyai, Euahlayi, Yuwaaliyaay, Gamilaraay, Kamilaroi, Yuwaaliyaayi) is an Australian Aboriginal language spoken on Yuwaalayaay country. It is closely related to the Gamilaraay and Yuwaalaraay languages. The Yuwaalayaay language region includes the landscape within the local government boundaries of the Shire of Balonne, including the town of Dirranbandi as well as the border town of Goodooga extending to Walgett and the Narran Lakes in New South Wales.

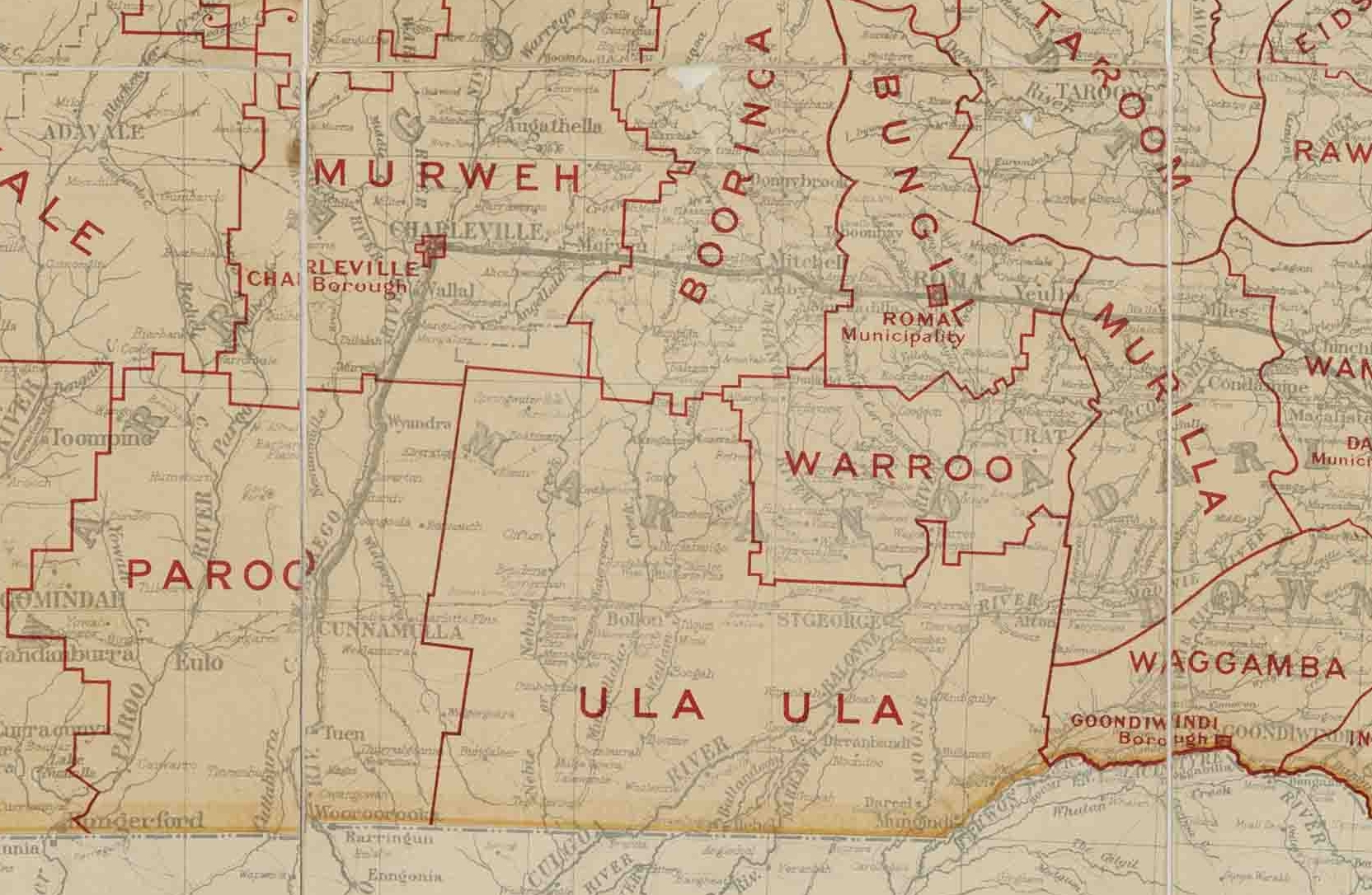
Map of Ula Ula Division and adjacent local government areas, March 1902

Ula Ula Division was created on 11 November 1879 as one of 74 divisions around Queensland under the Divisional Boards Act 1879 with a population of 1271. The name Ula Ula is believed to be derived from an Aboriginal word meaning water lilies, or ripples on water

A separate municipality, the Borough of St George was gazetted on 31 July 1884, but on 13 March 1886 it was abolished and amalgamated back into Ula Ula Division.

On 11 March 1903, Ula Ula Division was renamed Balonne Division, after the Balonne River. The name Balonne is believed to be of Aboriginal origin meaning water or running stream.

With the passage of the Local Authorities Act 1902, Balonne Division became Shire of Balonne on 31 March 1903.

== Rivers ==
The area contains the Balonne, Barwon, Boomi, Culgoa, Little Weir, Maranoa, Moonie, and Narran rivers, which attract fishermen seeking both yellowbelly and Murray cod.

== Towns and localities ==
The Shire of Balonne includes the following settlements:

- St George
- Alton
- Bollon
- Boolba
- Dirranbandi
- Hebel
- Mungindi
- Nindigully
- Thallon

== Annual events ==
Annual events include:

- Fishing competitions
- A golf carnival
- Motorbike endurance rallies
- Country shows and rodeos
- Wool, craft and flower shows

== Chairmen and mayors ==
- 1927: David Robert Roberts
- 2008–2016: Donna Stewart
- 2016: Richard Marsh
- 2020: Samantha Cathleen O'Toole

Other notable members of the council include:

- Eddie Beardmore, council member for 15 years and deputy chairman for 8 years, also Member of the Queensland Legislative Assembly for Balonne

== Demographics ==
Year	Population	Notes
1933	4,452	
1947	4,040	
1954	5,527	
1961	6,105	
1966	5,849	
1971	5,354	
1976	4,580	
1981	4,678	
1986	5,056	
1991	5,112	
1996	4,830	
2001 census	5,417	
2006 census	4,627	
2011 census	4,720	
2016 census	4,377	
2021 census	4,320	

== Services ==
Through Rural Libraries Queensland, Balonne Shire Council operates libraries at St George (headquarters), Bollon, Dirranbandi, Hebel and Thallon.
