= Culgoa (disambiguation) =

Culgoa may refer to:

== Locations ==
- Culgoa National Park, north-west New South Wales, Australia
- Culgoa River, northern New South Wales, Australia
- Culgoa Floodplain National Park, south-west Queensland, Australia
- Culgoa, town of north-west Victoria, Australia

== Ships ==
- HMAS Culgoa, a River-class frigate of the Royal Australian Navy
- USS Culgoa, a cargo ship bought by the US Navy

== See also ==
- Calgoa, Queensland
