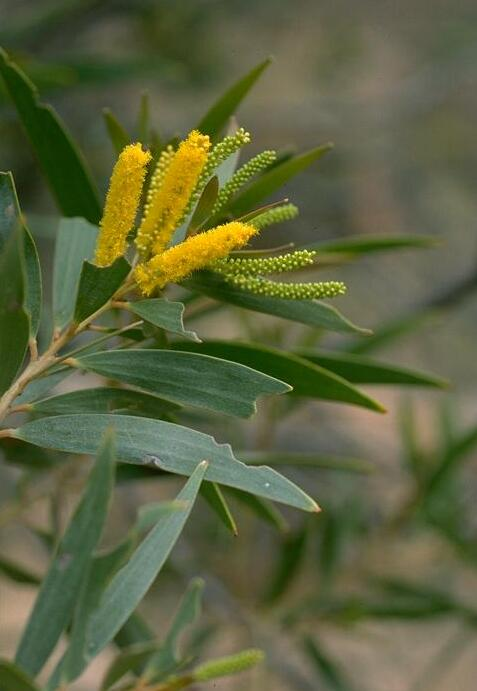
- In Porcupine Gorge National Park

Scientific classification
- Kingdom: Plantae
- Clade: Embryophytes
- Clade: Tracheophytes
- Clade: Spermatophytes
- Clade: Angiosperms
- Clade: Eudicots
- Clade: Rosids
- Order: Fabales
- Family: Fabaceae
- Subfamily: Caesalpinioideae
- Clade: Mimosoid clade
- Genus: Acacia
- Species: A. hemsleyi

Binomial name
- Acacia hemsleyi Maiden
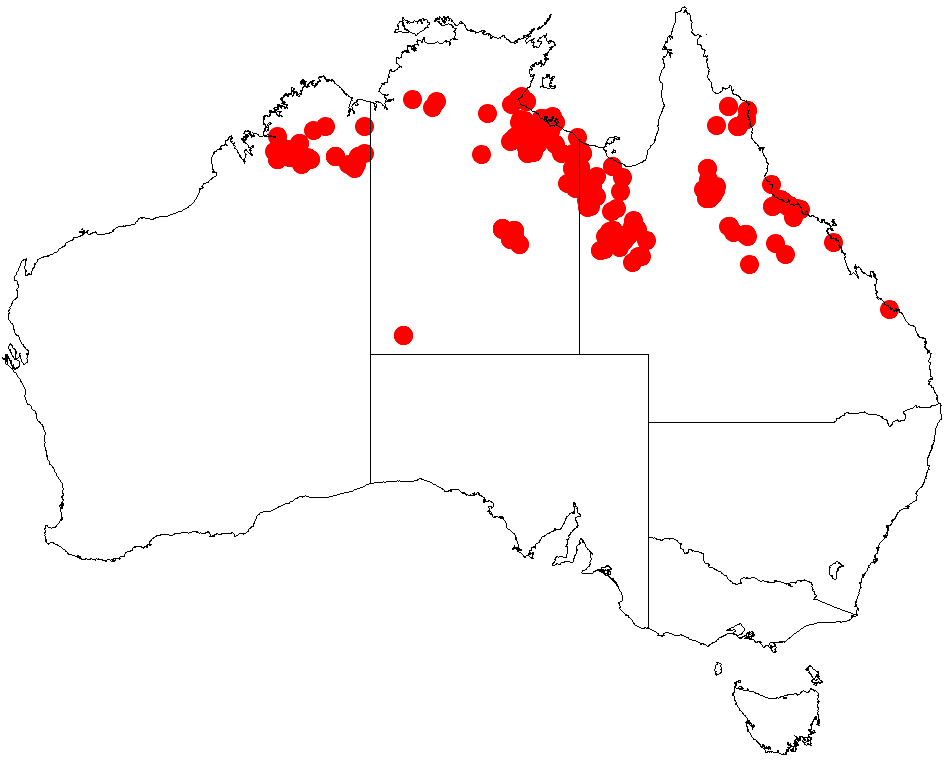
- Occurrence data from AVH

Synonyms
- Racosperma hemsleyi (Maiden) Pedley

= Acacia hemsleyi =

Species of legume

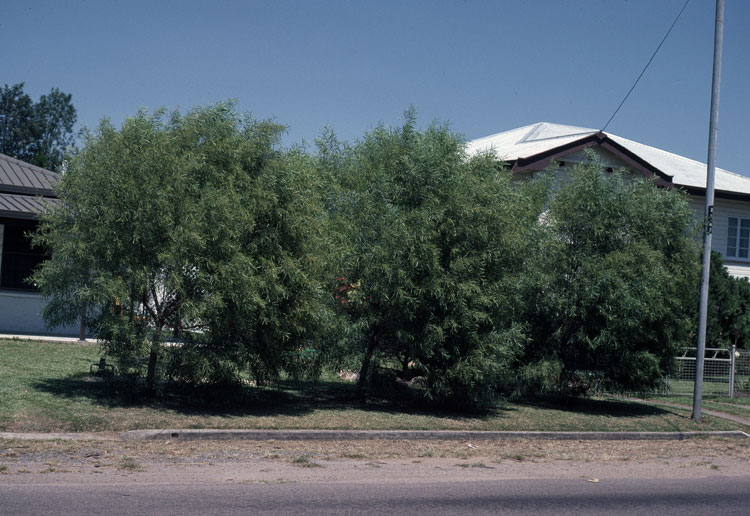
Habit in Townsville

Acacia hemsleyi is a species of flowering plant in the family Fabaceae and is endemic to tropical northern Australia. It is a slightly resinous shrub or tree with linear to very narrowly elliptic, straight or slightly curved phyllodes, yellow flowers borne in spikes, and linear, firmly papery to thinly leathery pods.

== Description ==
Acacia hemsleyi is a slightly resinous shrub or tree that typically grows to a height of up to 7 m (23 ft) and has slightly fissured or shredding bark. Its phyllodes are linear to very narrowly elliptic, staight of slightly curved, 40–145 mm (1.6–5.7 in) long and 3–14 mm (0.12–0.55 in) wide with a bristly point, usually 15–3 mm (0.59–0.12 in) long at the tip. The phyllodes are thinly to moderately leathery and glabrous, with two or three slightly prominent veins and a gland up to 3 mm (0.12 in) above the pulvinus. The flowers are yellow and borne in spikes 15–30 mm (0.59–1.18 in) long. Flowering occurs from June to September and the pods are linear, firmly papery to thinly leathery, 50–100 mm (2.0–3.9 in) long and 2.5–4.5 mm (0.098–0.177 in) wide, slightly constricted between, and raised over the seeds. The seeds are more or less elliptic to oblong, 4.5–5.5 mm (0.18–0.22 in) long and dark brown.

== Taxonomy ==
Acacia hemsleyi was first formally described in 1917 by Joseph Maiden in the Journal and Proceedings of the Royal Society of New South Wales from specimens collected near the Fitzroy River, 8 mi (13 km) above the junction with the Hann River by William Vincent Fitzgerald in 1905. The specific epithet (hemsleyi) honours William Botting Hemsley.

== Distribution and habitat ==
This species of wattle occurs in tropical Australia north of 21°S, in the Kimberley region of Western Australia, the north of the Northern Territory, and is very common in north-western Queensland. It grows along riverbanks and rocky creek beds and around permanent water sources.

== Conservation status ==
Acacia hemsleyi is listed as "not threatened" by the Government of Western Australia Department of Biodiversity, Conservation and Attractions, as of "least concern" under the Northern Territory Government Territory Parks and Wildlife Conservation Act and the Queensland Government Nature Conservation Act 1992.

== See also ==
- List of Acacia species
