= Graminitigrina bolloni =

Scientific classification
- Kingdom: Animalia
- Phylum: Arthropoda
- Clade: Pancrustacea
- Class: Insecta
- Order: Hemiptera
- Suborder: Auchenorrhyncha
- Family: Cicadidae
- Genus: Graminitigrina
- Species: G. bolloni

Binomial name
- Graminitigrina bolloni Ewart & Marques, 2008

Species of cicada

Graminitigrina bolloni is a species of cicada, also known as the southern grass-clicker, in the true cicada family, Cicadettinae subfamily and Cicadettini tribe. It is endemic to Australia. It was described in 2008 by entomologists Anthony Ewart and Diana Marques.

== Etymology ==
The specific epithet bolloni refers to the type locality of Bollon.

== Description ==
The length of the forewing is 11–14 mm.

== Distribution and habitat ==
The species occurs from Jericho in Central West Queensland to Bollon and St George in South West Queensland. Its associated habitat is low grassy woodland and open grassland.

== Behaviour ==
Adults have been heard from December to January, clinging to grass stems and small shrubs, uttering strident clicking calls.
