= Hebel, Queensland =

Hebel
- Town
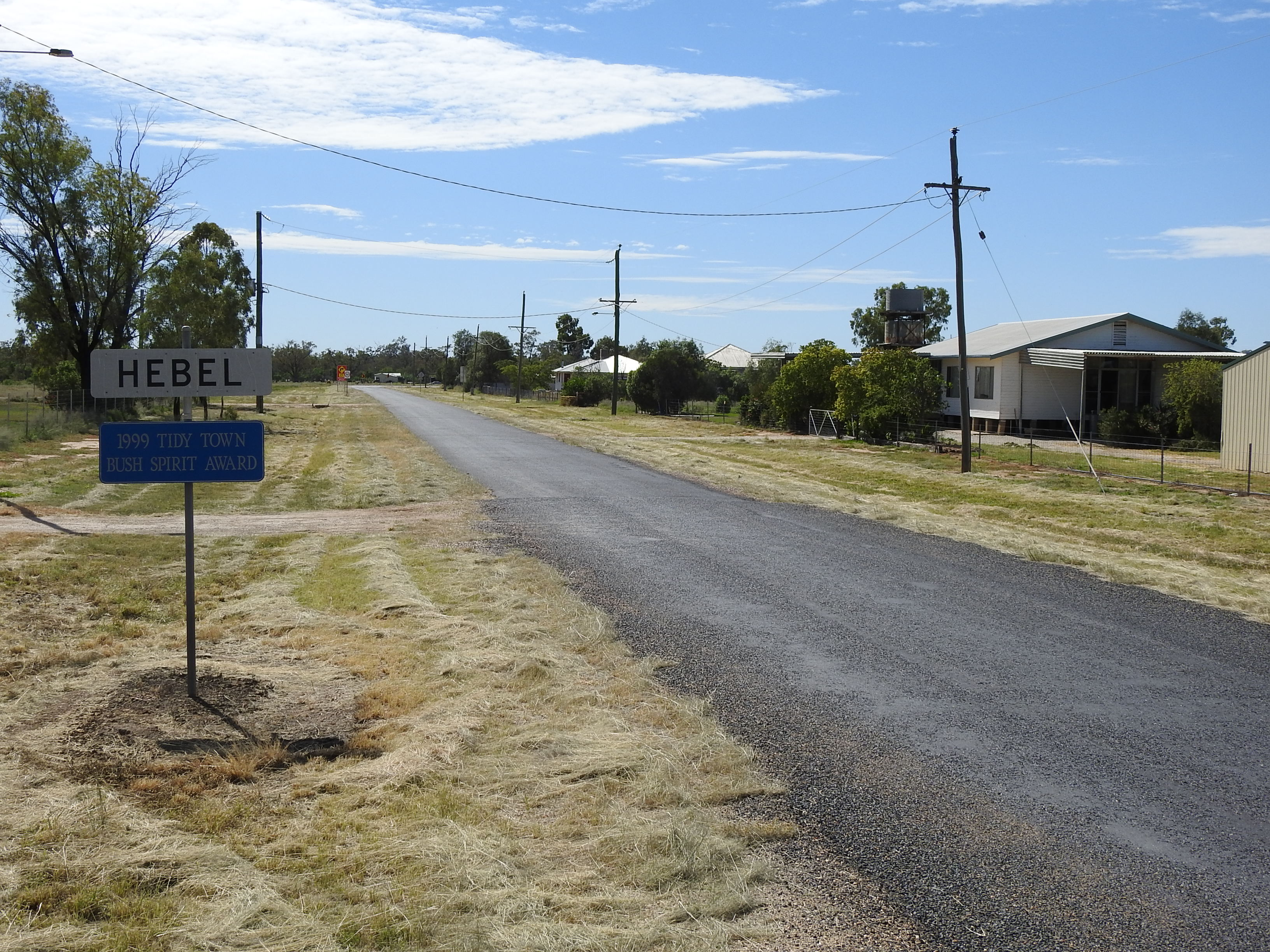
- Entry sign to Hebel (2021).

- Interactive map of Hebel
- Coordinates: 28.9730°S 147.7930°E
- Country: Australia
- State: Queensland
- LGA: Balonne Shire
- Location: 66.4 km (41.3 mi) SW of Dirranbandi; 161 km (100 mi) SW of St George; 522 km (324 mi) WSW of Toowoomba; 652 km (405 mi) WSW of Brisbane

Government
  - State electorate: Warrego
  - Federal division: Maranoa

Area
  - Total: 1,697.1 km^{2} (655.3 sq mi)

Population
  - Total: 62 (2021 census)
  - Density: 0.03653/km^{2} (0.0946/sq mi)
- Time zone: UTC+10:00 (AEST)
- Postcode: 4486
Localities around Hebel
Bollon	Dirranbandi	Dirranbandi
Jobs Gate	Hebel	Dirranbandi
Weilmoringle (NSW)	Goodooga (NSW)	Angledool (NSW)

Hebel (pronounced he-bell) is a rural town and locality in the Shire of Balonne, Queensland, Australia. It is on the border of Queensland and New South Wales. In the 2021 census, the locality of Hebel had a population of 62 people.

== Geography ==
Hebel is in south-west Queensland situated 4 kilometres (2 mi) north of the border with New South Wales on the Castlereagh Highway. It is the eastern corner of the locality.

The Bokhara River (a non-perennial river) enters the locality from the east (Dirranbandi) and flows past the immediate north of the town and exits the locality to the south (Goodooga in New South Wales). It is part of the Murray-Darling River system.

In the west of the locality is the Culgoa River and the Culgoa Floodplain National Park (28.9164°S 147.0111°E), which extends into neighbouring Jobs Gate.

There are a number of homesteads in the locality:

- Balgi (28.8425°S 147.7937°E)
- Ballandool (28.9716°S 147.6455°E)
- Byra (28.9785°S 147.2175°E)
- Currawillinghi (28.9377°S 147.7560°E)
- Davirton (28.8340°S 147.4729°E)
- Goonaroo (28.9425°S 147.8462°E)
- Kinglebilla (28.8166°S 147.4779°E)
- Koala (28.9668°S 147.7713°E)
- Morley (28.8832°S 147.6134°E)
- Tara (28.9821°S 147.2720°E)
- Yattenbury (28.8968°S 147.6996°E)

== History ==
Yuwaalaraay (also known as Yuwalyai, Euahlayi, Yuwaaliyaay, Gamilaraay, Kamilaroi, Yuwaaliyaayi) is an Australian Aboriginal language spoken on Yuwaalaraay country. The Yuwaalaraay language region includes the landscape within the local government boundaries of the Shire of Balonne, including the town of Dirranbandi as well as the border town of Hebel extending to Walgett and Collarenebri in New South Wales.

Yuwaalayaay (also known as Yuwalyai, Euahlayi, Yuwaaliyaay, Gamilaraay, Kamilaroi, Yuwaaliyaayi) is an Australian Aboriginal language spoken on Yuwaalayaay country. It is closely related to the Gamilaraay and Yuwaalaraay languages. The Yuwaalayaay language region includes the landscape within the local government boundaries of the Shire of Balonne, including the town of Dirranbandi as well as the border town of Goodooga extending to Walgett and the Narran Lakes in New South Wales.

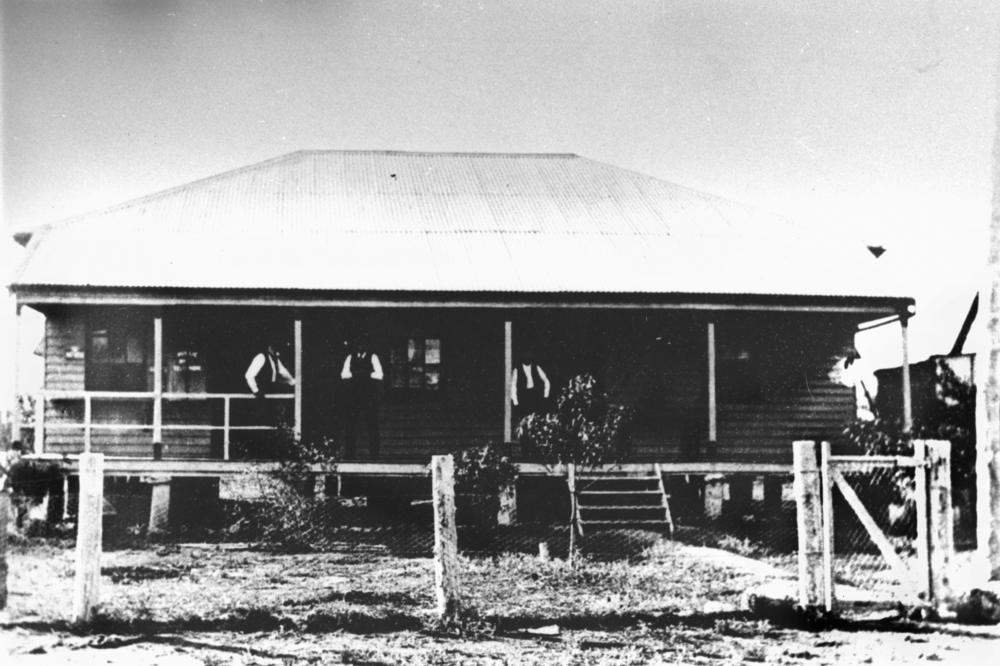
Hebel Post Office, circa 1920

The town was reputedly named after a German immigrant Noble Van Hebel. Hebel helped stage the coaches for Cobb and Co.

Curriwillinghi Post Office opened on 1 January 1864 (named after the Curriwillinghi pastoral station, which still exists as at 2020 at 28.9317°S 147.7672°E).

Circa 1886, Hebel was established as a border township with a border customs post, 3 miles (4.8 km) east of Curriwillinghi pastoral station. In 1889, the Curriwillinghi Post Office was replaced by the Hebel Post Office.

In 1897 a dance hall was built. It is now the general store.

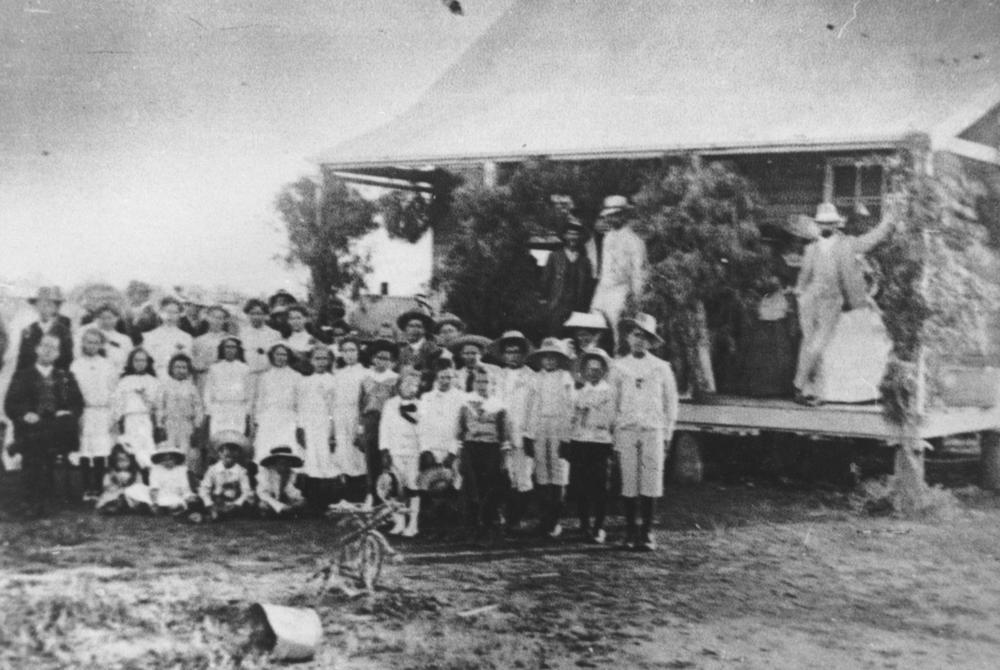
Celebrations at Hebel State School, 1901

Hebel Provisional School opened on 11 April 1901. On 1 January 1909, it became Hebel State School.

The Hebel Post office closed in 1989.

During 2020 and 2021, the Queensland border was closed due to the COVID-19 pandemic. Some border crossing points had Queensland Police checkpoints to confirm eligibility to enter Queensland, while other border crossing points were closed. At Hebel, there was a police border checkpoint on the Castlereagh Highway. The border crossing on the Hebel Goodooga Road was closed by the Balonne Shire Council building an earth wall across the road, although many local people doubted its effectiveness as a barrier to entry.

Hebel was the feature of ABC Back Roads Series 8, Episode 11; it was aired on 25 July 2022.

== Demographics ==
In the 2006 census, the locality of Hebel and the surrounding area had a population of 149 people.

In the 2016 census, the locality of Hebel had a population of 67 people.

In the 2021 census, the locality of Hebel had a population of 62 people.

== Education ==
Hebel State School is a government primary (Preparatory to Year 6) school for boys and girls in Maud Street (28.9709°S 147.7910°E). In 2015, it had an enrolment of eleven students with two teachers (one full-time equivalent) and five non-teaching staff (two full-time equivalent). In 2018, the school had an enrolment of seven students with one teacher and five non-teaching staff (2 full-time equivalent). However, students living in the west of Hebel would be too distant for a daily commute; the alternatives are distance education and boarding school.

There are no secondary schools in Hebel. The nearest government secondary school is Dirranbandi State School (to Year 10) in Dirranbandi to the north-east and St George State High School (to Year 12) in St George to the north-east. Again, these schools are too distant for most Hebel students to attend; the alternatives are distance education and boarding school.

== Amenities ==
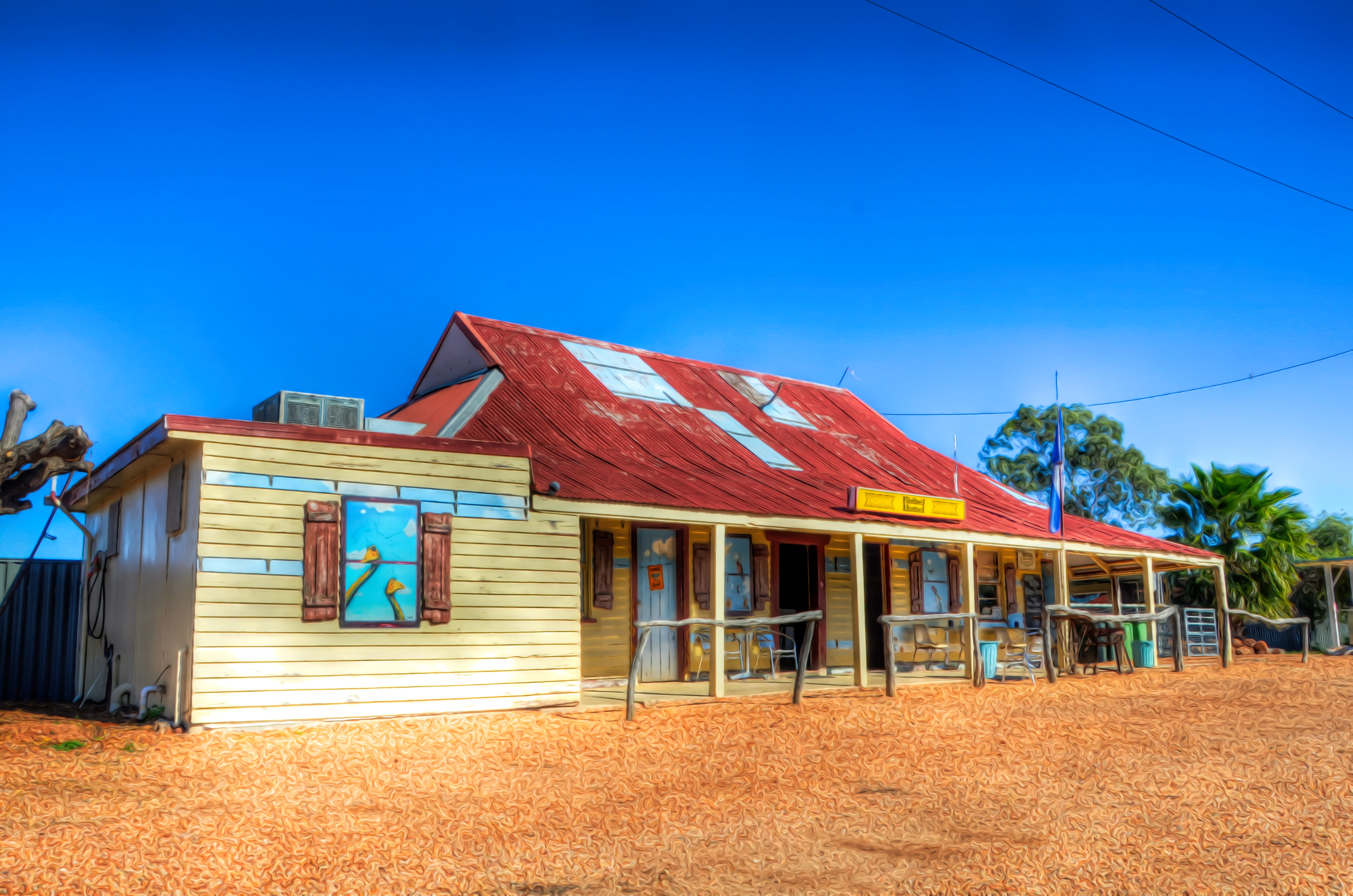
The Hebel Hotel, 2017

Balonne Shire Council operates a library in William Street.

Hebel Community Hall is at 40–50 William Street (28.9730°S 147.7952°E).

Hebel Racecourse is a 24-hectare (59-acre) reserve west of Henry Street (28.9761°S 147.7903°E).

Hebel Cemetery is on the south-east edge of the town (28.9764°S 147.7971°E).

== Transport ==
There are a number of airstrips in the locality:

- Balgi airstrip (28.8494°S 147.7999°E)
- Ballandool airstrip (28.9646°S 147.6450°E)
- Brenda airstrip (28.8300°S 147.4161°E)
- Byra airstrip (28.9749°S 147.1941°E)
- Davirton airstrip (28.8279°S 147.4808°E)
- Hebel airstrip (28.9788°S 147.8165°E)

== Attractions ==
The front of the Hebel Hotel featured brightly coloured art work by John Murray, which the interior furnishings are made of recycled items found in the bush.

The Hebel Historical Circle is a walk around the town illustrates places of historic interest.

The general store is also a cafe and restaurant; it retains its original dance floor.

Bokhara River Campground is a 0.84-hectare (2.1-acre) site on James Street on the north side of town (28.9694°S 147.7967°E).

== Gallery ==
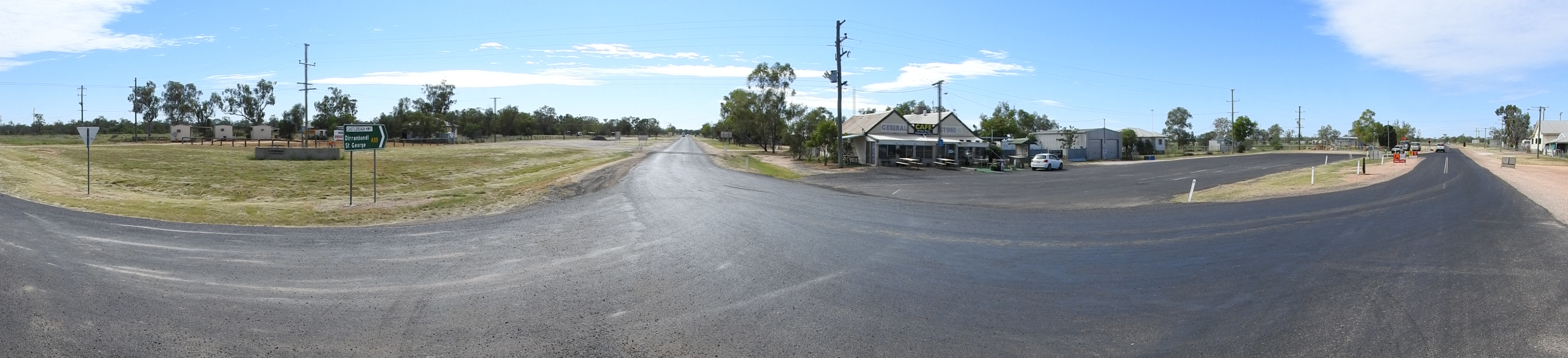
Centre of town intersection, looking north (2021).
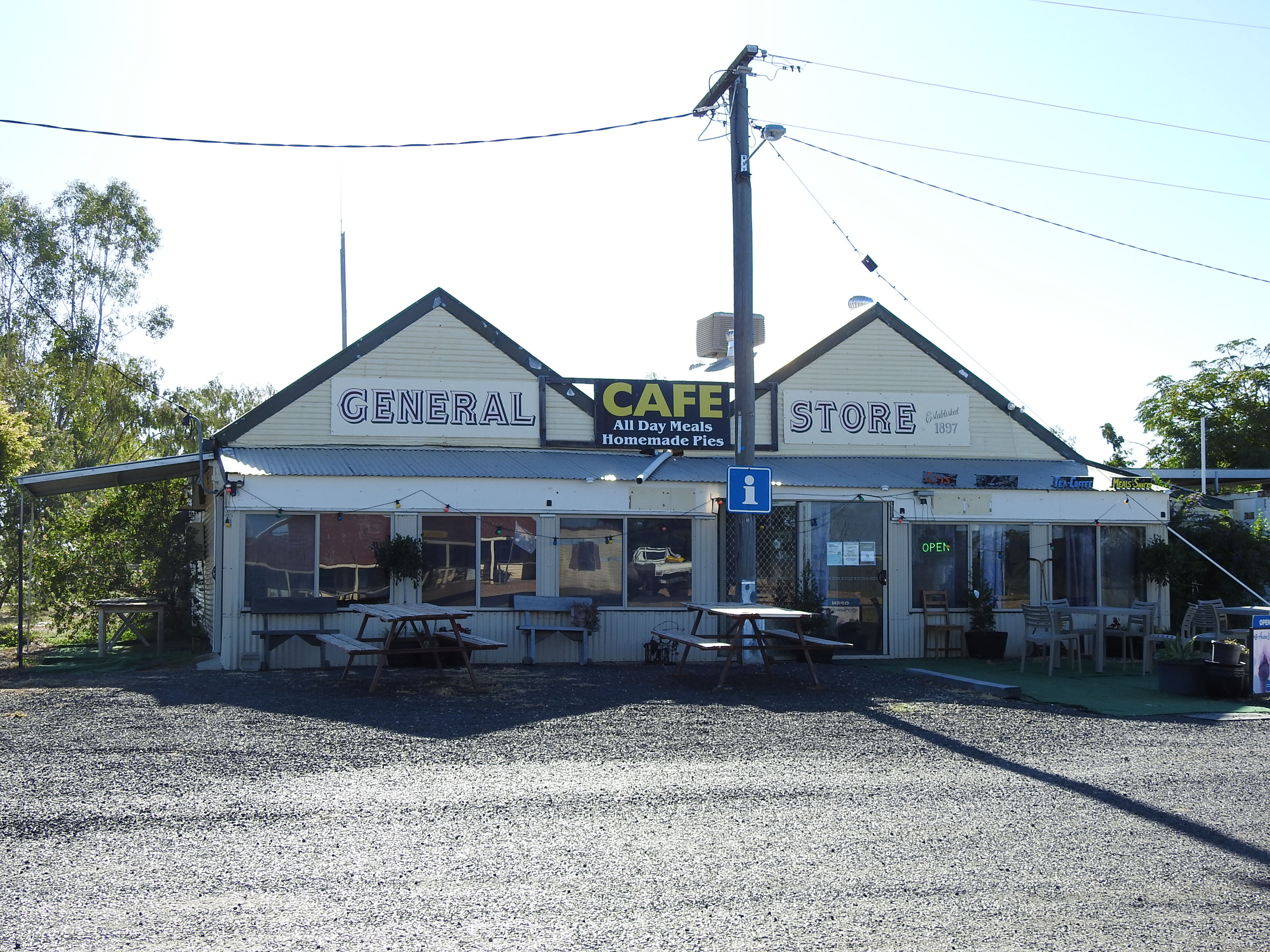
General store, Castlereagh Highway (2021).

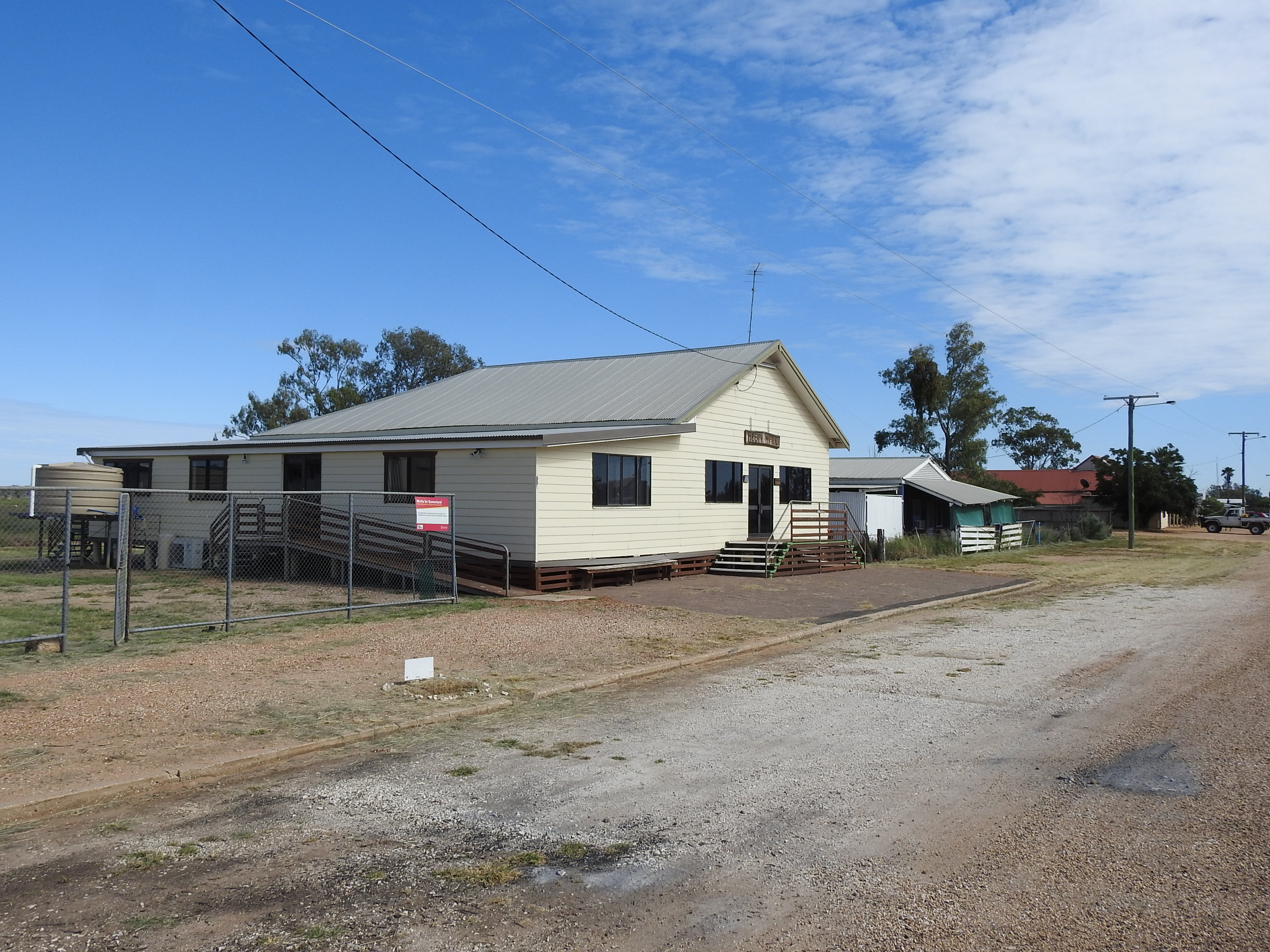
Community Hall, William Street (2021).

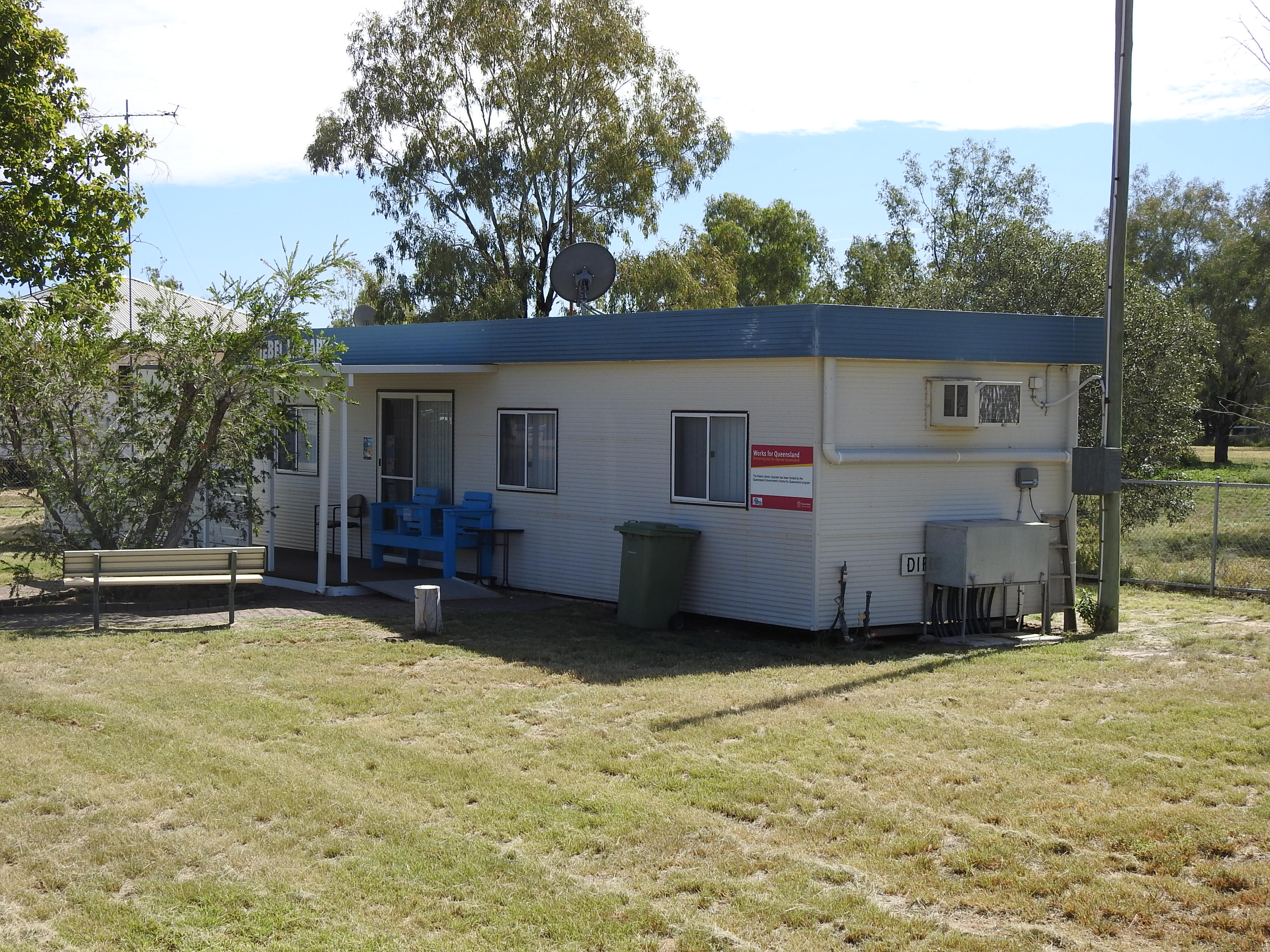
Local library (2021).

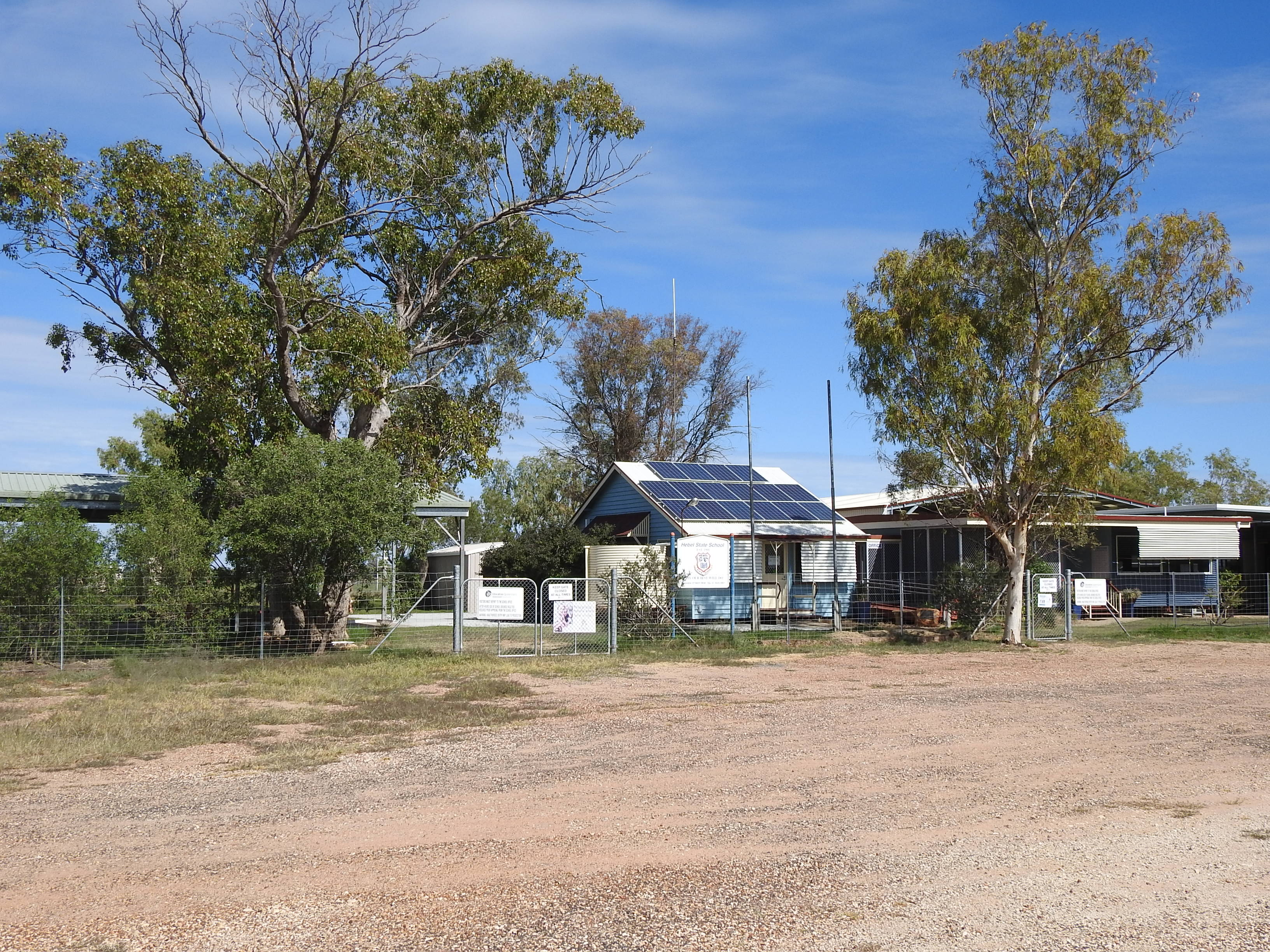
Hebel State School (2021).

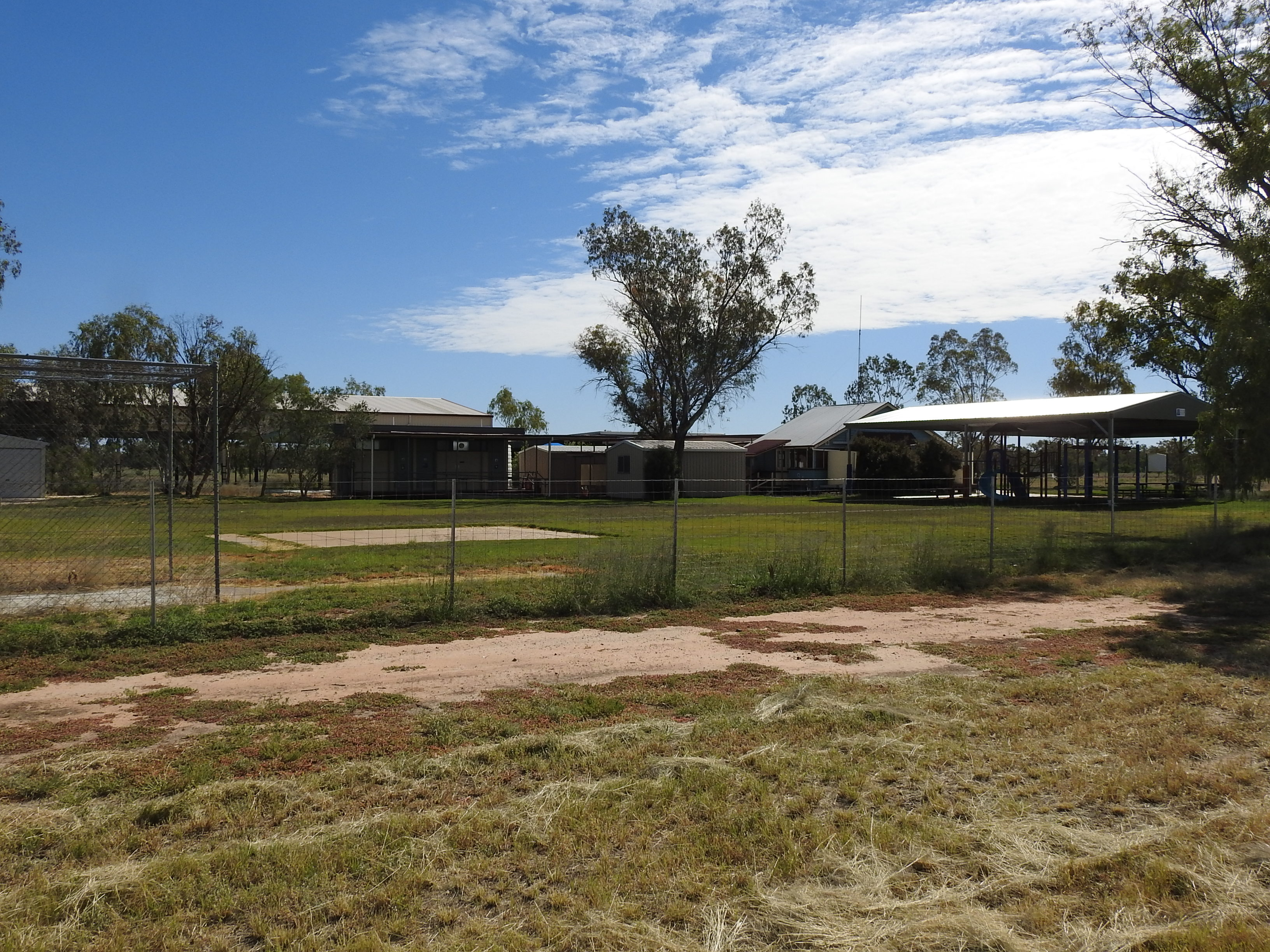
Hebel State School oval (2021).

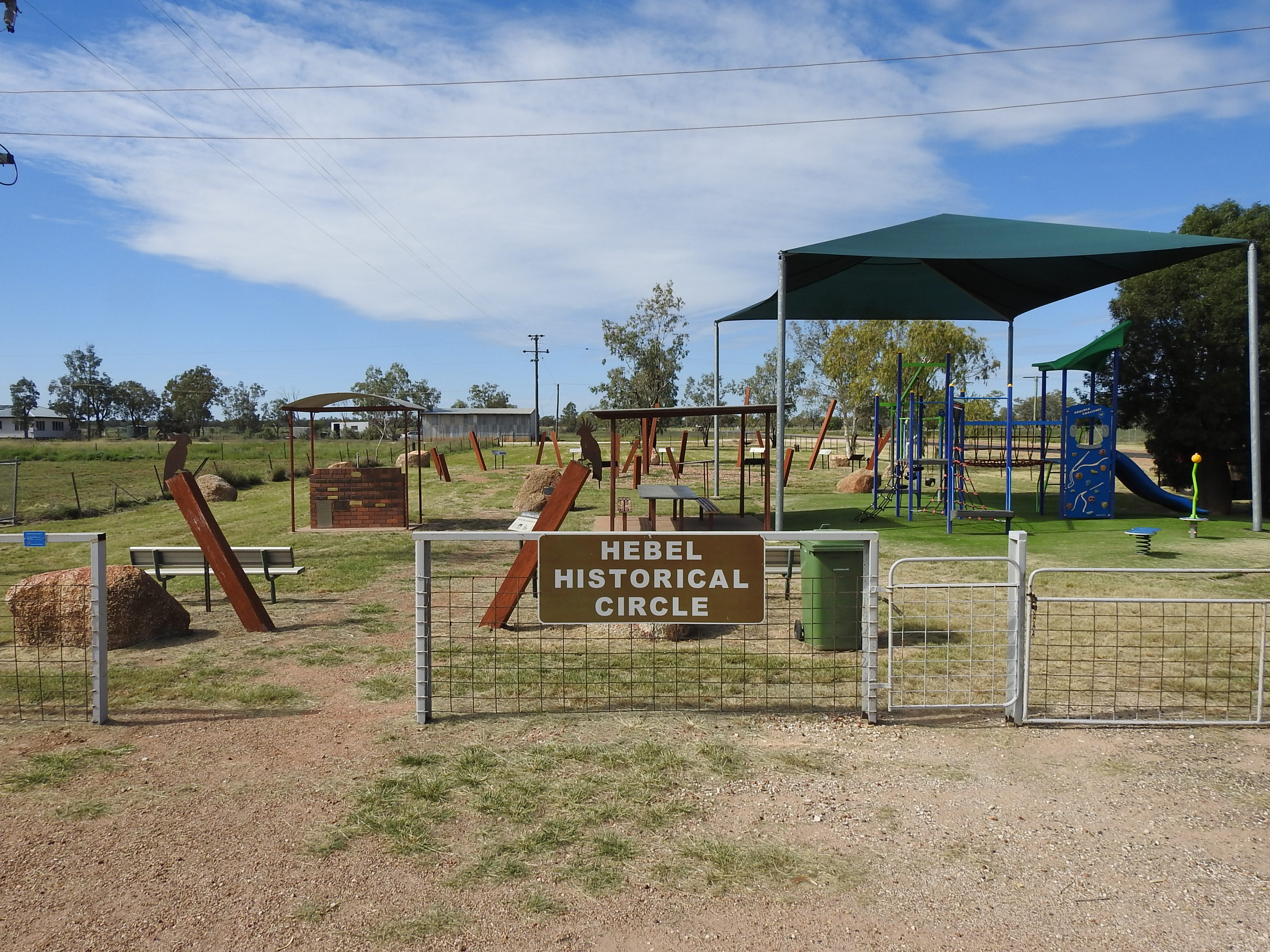
Hebel Bicentennial Park, William Street (2021).

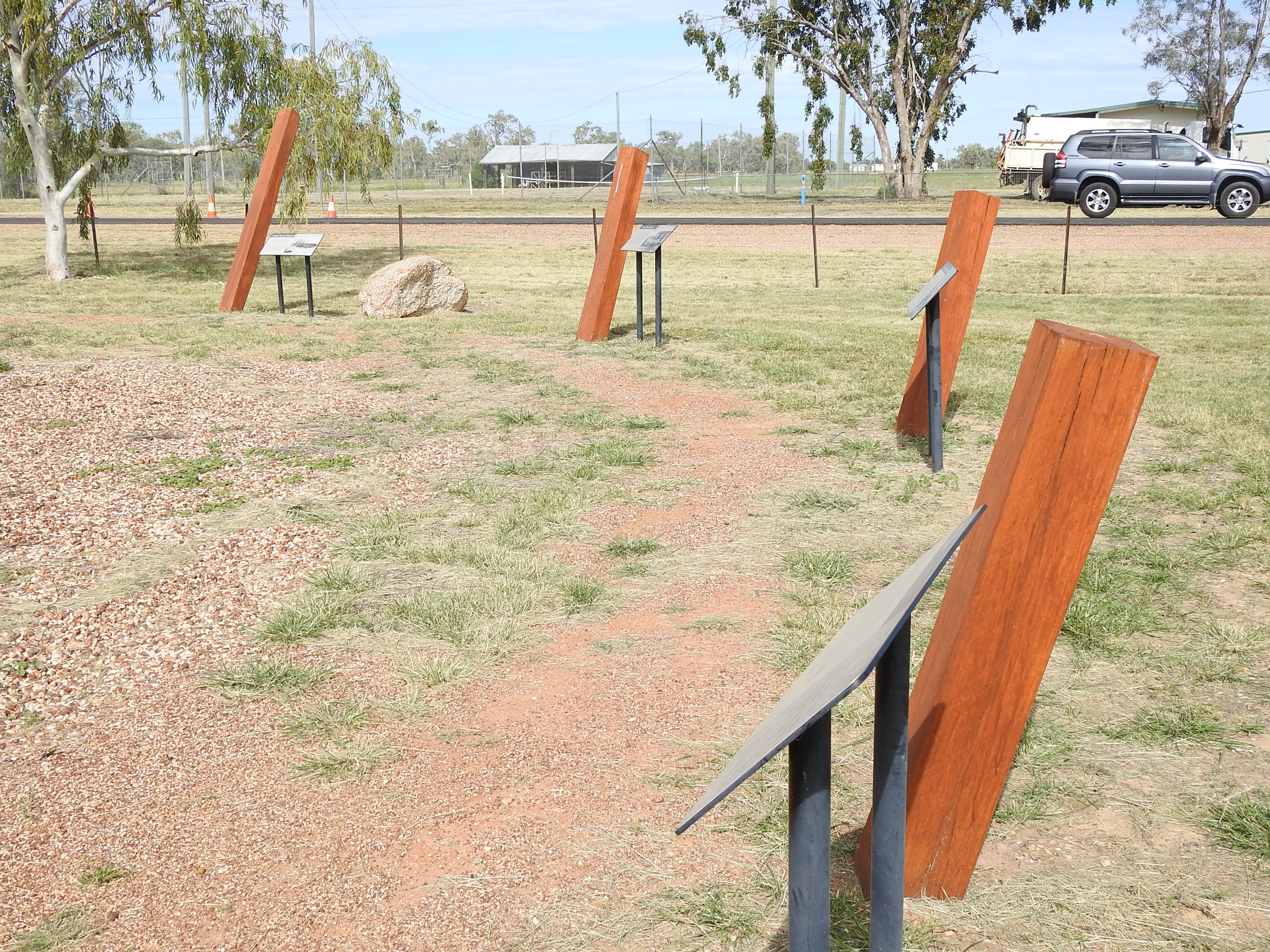
Hebel Historical Circle, in the Bicentennial Park (2021).

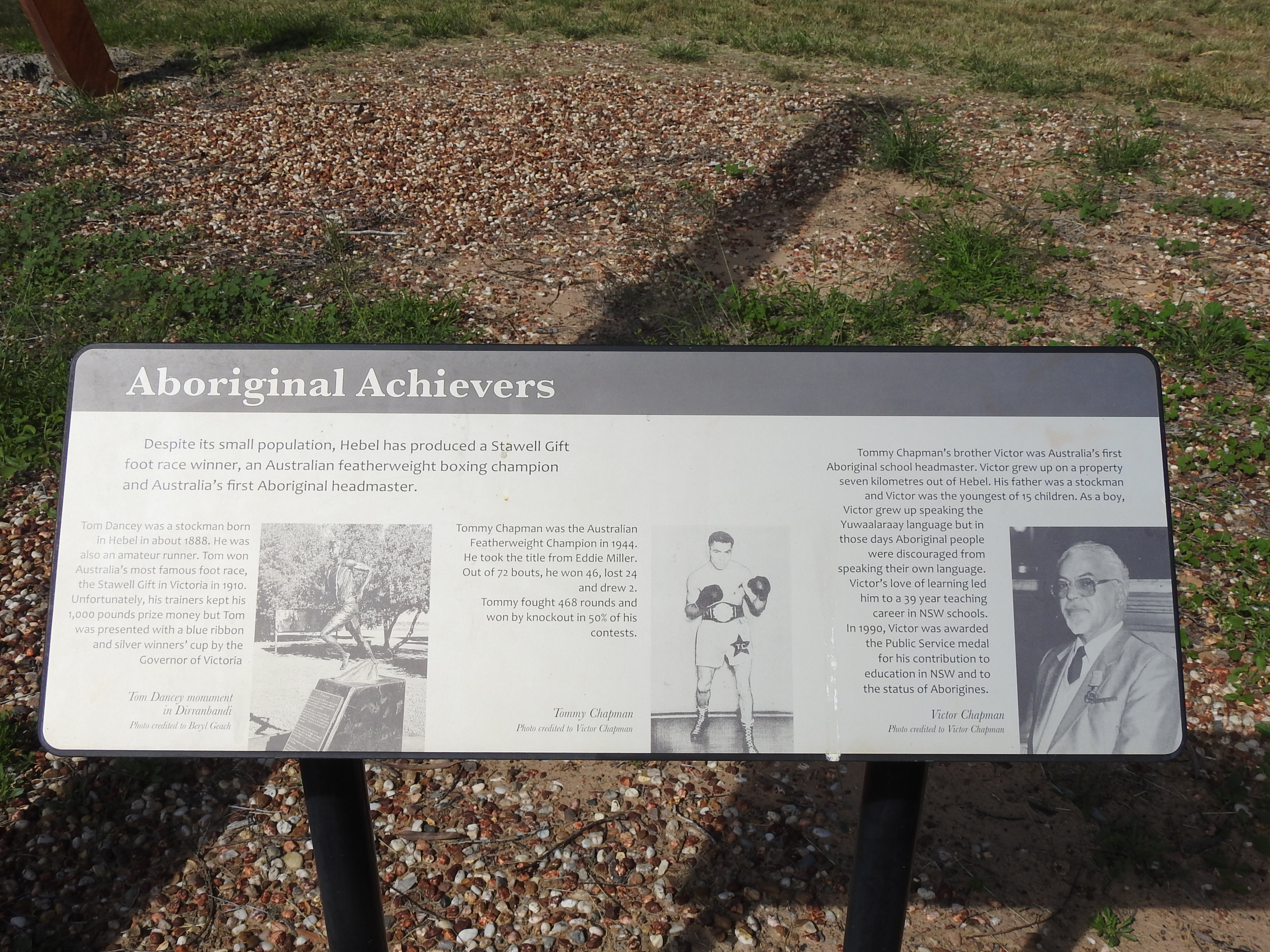
Historical Circle information panel example (2021).

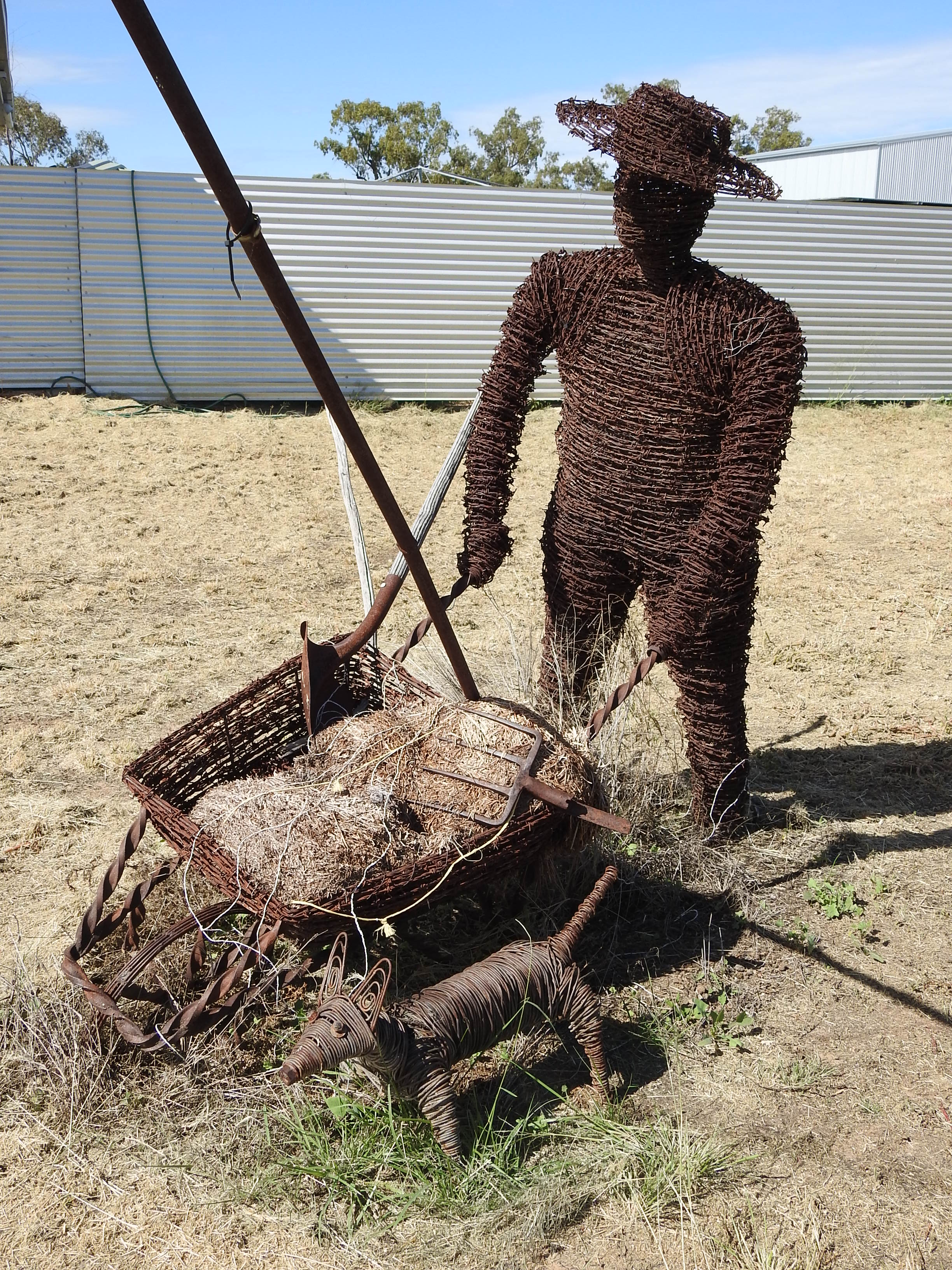
Artwork made from barbwire, of a person pushing a wheelbarrow, with a dog (2021).

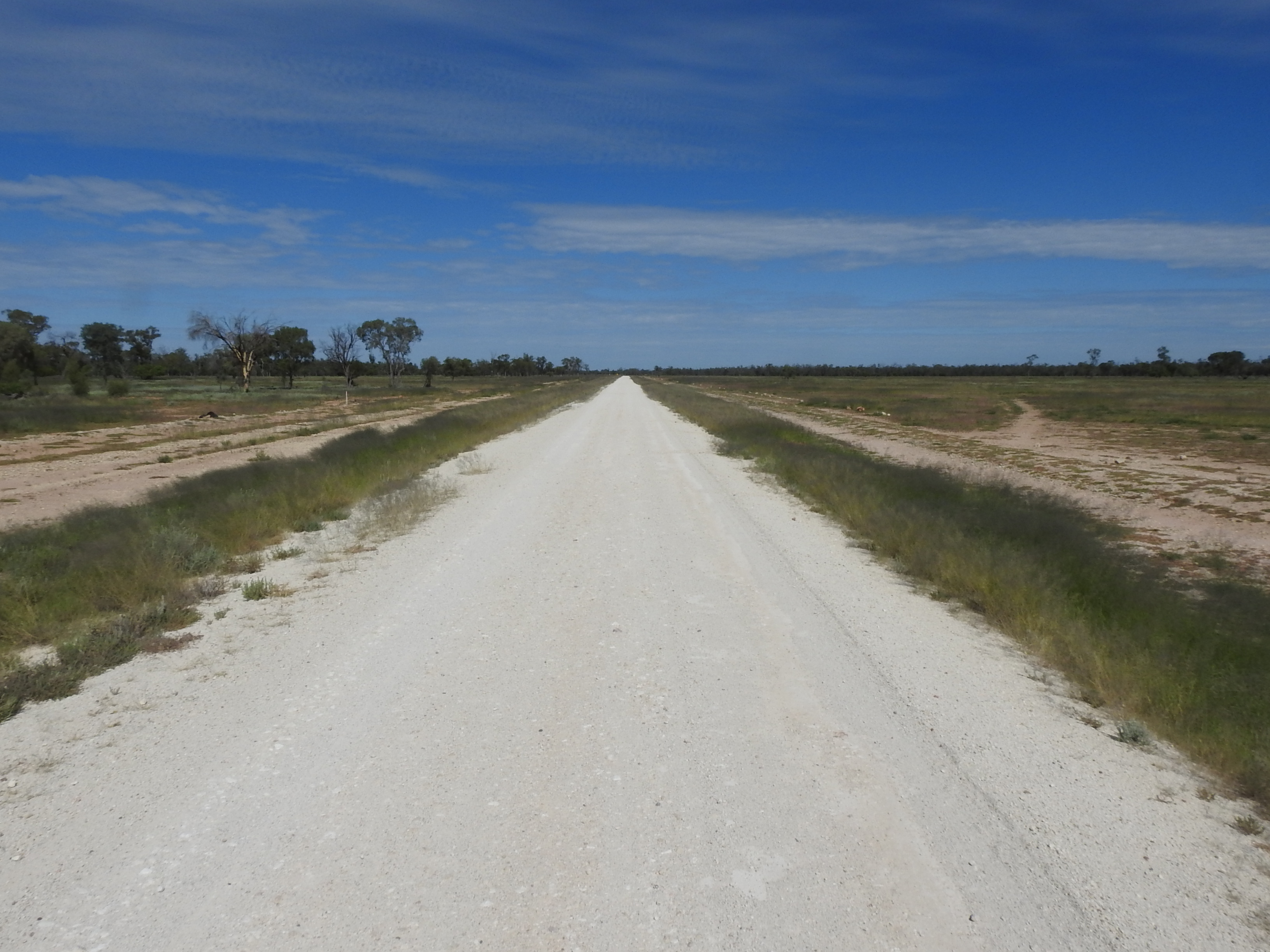
Hebel-Goodooga Road going south-west (2021).
