= Graminitigrina uluruensis =

Scientific classification
- Kingdom: Animalia
- Phylum: Arthropoda
- Clade: Pancrustacea
- Class: Insecta
- Order: Hemiptera
- Suborder: Auchenorrhyncha
- Family: Cicadidae
- Genus: Graminitigrina
- Species: G. uluruensis

Binomial name
- Graminitigrina uluruensis Ewart, Popple & Hill, 20017

Species of cicada

Graminitigrina uluruensis is a species of cicada, also known as the Uluru grass-clicker, in the true cicada family, Cicadettinae subfamily and Cicadettini tribe. It is endemic to Australia. It was described in 2017 by entomologists Anthony Ewart, Lindsay Popple and Kathy Hill.

== Etymology ==
The specific epithet uluruensis refers to the type locality.

== Description ==
The length of the forewing is 13–16 mm.

== Distribution and habitat ==
The species occurs in the Uluṟu-Kata Tjuṯa National Park, as well as at Tennant Creek and near Larrimah, all in the Northern Territory. The holotype was collected at Uluru. Its associated habitat is grassland with low, scattered trees.

== Behaviour ==
Adults have been heard in January and February, clinging to grass stems, uttering ratchet-like calls containing sequences of clicks ending in a chirp.
