= Graminitigrina triodiae =

Scientific classification
- Kingdom: Animalia
- Phylum: Arthropoda
- Clade: Pancrustacea
- Class: Insecta
- Order: Hemiptera
- Suborder: Auchenorrhyncha
- Family: Cicadidae
- Genus: Graminitigrina
- Species: G. triodiae

Binomial name
- Graminitigrina triodiae Ewart & Marques, 2008

Species of cicada

Graminitigrina triodiae is a species of cicada, also known as the central grass-clicker, in the true cicada family, Cicadettinae subfamily and Cicadettini tribe. It is endemic to Australia. It was described in 2008 by entomologists Anthony Ewart and Diana Marques.

== Etymology ==
The specific epithet triodiae refers to the favoured habitat.

== Description ==
The length of the forewing is 11–14 mm.

== Distribution and habitat ==
The species is known only from the Burra Range section of the White Mountains National Park in North Queensland. Its associated habitat is open woodland with an understorey of spinifex (Triodia) grassland.

== Behaviour ==
Adults have been heard in February, sitting in clumps of spinifex, uttering short clicking calls.
