= Graminitigrina karumbae =

Scientific classification
- Kingdom: Animalia
- Phylum: Arthropoda
- Clade: Pancrustacea
- Class: Insecta
- Order: Hemiptera
- Suborder: Auchenorrhyncha
- Family: Cicadidae
- Genus: Graminitigrina
- Species: G. karumbae

Binomial name
- Graminitigrina karumbae Ewart & Marques, 2008

Species of cicada

Graminitigrina karumbae is a species of cicada, also known as the far northern grass-clicker, in the true cicada family, Cicadettinae subfamily and Cicadettini tribe. It is endemic to Australia. It was described in 2008 by entomologists Anthony Ewart and Diana Marques.

== Etymology ==
The specific epithet karumbae refers to the type locality.

== Description ==
The length of the forewing is 11–14 mm.

== Distribution and habitat ==
The species occurs along the western side of the Cape York Peninsula in Far North Queensland, from Heathlands southwards to Karumba (the type locality) and Croydon on the Gulf of Carpentaria. Its associated habitat is floodplain grassland.

== Behaviour ==
Adults are heard from December to January, clinging to grass stems, uttering short buzzing calls punctuated by clicks.
