= Graminitigrina bowensis =

Scientific classification
- Kingdom: Animalia
- Phylum: Arthropoda
- Clade: Pancrustacea
- Class: Insecta
- Order: Hemiptera
- Suborder: Auchenorrhyncha
- Family: Cicadidae
- Genus: Graminitigrina
- Species: G. bowensis

Binomial name
- Graminitigrina bowensis Ewart & Marques, 2008

Species of cicada

Graminitigrina bowensis is a species of cicada, also known as the northern grass-clicker, in the true cicada family, Cicadettinae subfamily and Cicadettini tribe. It is endemic to Australia. It was described in 2008 by entomologists Anthony Ewart and Diana Marques.

== Etymology ==
The specific epithet bowensis refers to the type locality.

== Description ==
The length of the forewing is 11–14 mm.

== Distribution and habitat ==
The species occurs in North Queensland between Bowen (the type locality), Mount Surprise and Dimbulah. Its associated habitat is open grassy woodland and sparsely-treed grassland.

== Behaviour ==
Adults have been heard from January to February, clinging to grass stems, uttering calls with long phrases followed by clicks.
