= Graminitigrina selwynensis =

Scientific classification
- Kingdom: Animalia
- Phylum: Arthropoda
- Clade: Pancrustacea
- Class: Insecta
- Order: Hemiptera
- Suborder: Auchenorrhyncha
- Family: Cicadidae
- Genus: Graminitigrina
- Species: G. selwynensis

Binomial name
- Graminitigrina selwynensis Ewart, Popple & Hill, 2017

Species of cicada

Graminitigrina selwynensis is a species of cicada, also known as the Selwyn Range grass-clicker, in the true cicada family, Cicadettinae subfamily and Cicadettini tribe. It is endemic to Australia. It was described in 2017 by entomologists Anthony Ewart, Lindsay Popple and Kathy Hill.

== Etymology ==
The specific epithet selwynensis is derived from the Selwyn Range, the general area where the cicadas are found.

== Description ==
The length of the forewing is 13–16 mm.

== Distribution and habitat ==
The species occurs in the Selwyn Range, in the Mount Isa–Cloncurry region of north-western Queensland. Its associated habitat is open eucalypt woodland.

== Behaviour ==
Adults have been heard in January and February, clinging to grass stems, uttering strong chirping, rattling and buzzing calls.
