= Graminitigrina aurora =

Scientific classification
- Kingdom: Animalia
- Phylum: Arthropoda
- Clade: Pancrustacea
- Class: Insecta
- Order: Hemiptera
- Suborder: Auchenorrhyncha
- Family: Cicadidae
- Genus: Graminitigrina
- Species: G. aurora

Binomial name
- Graminitigrina aurora Ewart, Popple & Hill, 2017

Species of cicada

Graminitigrina aurora is a species of cicada, also known as the Emerald grass-clicker, in the true cicada family, Cicadettinae subfamily and Cicadettini tribe. It is endemic to Australia. It was described in 2017 by entomologists Anthony Ewart, Lindsay Popple and Kathy Hill.

== Etymology ==
The specific epithet aurora (Latin: ‘dawn’ or ‘sunrise’) refers to the time of day when the cicadas sing most consistently.

== Description ==
The length of the forewing is 13–15 mm.

== Distribution and habitat ==
The species is known only from the vicinity of Emerald in the Central Highlands Region of Queensland. Its associated habitat is grassland.

== Behaviour ==
Adults have been heard in January, clinging to grass stems, uttering strong chirping and clicking calls.
