= Graminitigrina carnarvonensis =

Scientific classification
- Kingdom: Animalia
- Phylum: Arthropoda
- Clade: Pancrustacea
- Class: Insecta
- Order: Hemiptera
- Suborder: Auchenorrhyncha
- Family: Cicadidae
- Genus: Graminitigrina
- Species: G. carnarvonensis

Binomial name
- Graminitigrina carnarvonensis Ewart & Marques, 2008

Species of cicada

Graminitigrina carnarvonensis is a species of cicada, also known as the Maranoa grass-clicker, in the true cicada family, Cicadettinae subfamily and Cicadettini tribe. It is endemic to Australia. It was described in 2008 by entomologists Anthony Ewart and Diana Marques.

== Etymology ==
The specific epithet carnarvonensis refers to the type locality.

== Description ==
The length of the forewing is 12–15 mm.

== Distribution and habitat ==
The species occurs in southern Central Queensland around the headwaters of the Maranoa River in the Mount Moffat section of the Carnarvon National Park. Its associated habitat is grassy woodland.

== Behaviour ==
Adults have been heard from November to January, clinging to grass stems, uttering strident clicking calls.
