= Graminitigrina =

Scientific classification
- Kingdom: Animalia
- Phylum: Arthropoda
- Clade: Pancrustacea
- Class: Insecta
- Order: Hemiptera
- Suborder: Auchenorrhyncha
- Family: Cicadidae
- Subfamily: Cicadettinae
- Genus: Graminitigrina; Ewart & Marques, 2008

Genus of cicadas

Graminitigrina is a genus of cicadas, also known as grass-clickers, in the family Cicadidae, subfamily Cicadettinae and tribe Cicadettini. It is endemic to Australia. It was described in 2008 by entomologists Anthony Ewart and Diana Marques.

== Etymology ==
The genus name Graminitigrina is a combination derived from Latin gramen (‘grass’), for the cicadas’ grassy habitat, and tigrina (‘tiger-like’) for their conspicuous yellowish-orange and black colouration.

== Species ==
As of 2025 there were ten described species in the genus:

- Graminitigrina aurora Ewart, Popple and Hill, 2017 (Emerald Grass-ticker)
- Graminitigrina bolloni Ewart and Marques, 2008 (Southern Grass-clicker )
- Graminitigrina bowensis Ewart and Marques, 2008 (Northern Grass-clicker)
- Graminitigrina carnarvonensis Ewart and Marques, 2008 (Maranoa Grass-clicker)
- Graminitigrina einasleighi Ewart, Popple and Hill, 2017 (Ornamental Grass-clicker)
- Graminitigrina flindensis Ewart, Popple and Hill, 2017 (Hughenden Grass-clicker)
- Graminitigrina karumbae Ewart and Marques, 2008 (Far Northern Grass-clicker)
- Graminitigrina selwynensis Ewart, Popple and Hill, 2017 (Selwyn Range Grass-clicker)
- Graminitigrina triodiae Ewart and Marques, 2008 (Central Grass-clicker)
- Graminitigrina uluruensis Ewart, Popple and Hill, 2017 (Uluru Grass-clicker)
