= Graminitigrina einasleighi =

Scientific classification
- Kingdom: Animalia
- Phylum: Arthropoda
- Clade: Pancrustacea
- Class: Insecta
- Order: Hemiptera
- Suborder: Auchenorrhyncha
- Family: Cicadidae
- Genus: Graminitigrina
- Species: G. einasleighi

Binomial name
- Graminitigrina einasleighi Ewart, Popple & Hill, 2017

Species of cicada

Graminitigrina einasleighi is a species of cicada, also known as the ornamental grass-clicker, in the true cicada family, Cicadettinae subfamily and Cicadettini tribe. It is endemic to Australia. It was described in 2017 by entomologists Anthony Ewart, Lindsay Popple and Kathy Hill.

== Etymology ==
The specific epithet einasleighi refers to the type locality.

== Description ==
The length of the forewing is 12–14 mm.

== Distribution and habitat ==
The species is known only from the floodplain of the Einasleigh River in North Queensland. Its associated habitat is riverine grassy woodland.

== Behaviour ==
Adults have been heard in February, clinging to grass stems, uttering strong chirping and clicking calls.
