= Porcupine Gorge =

Gorge in North West Queensland, Australia

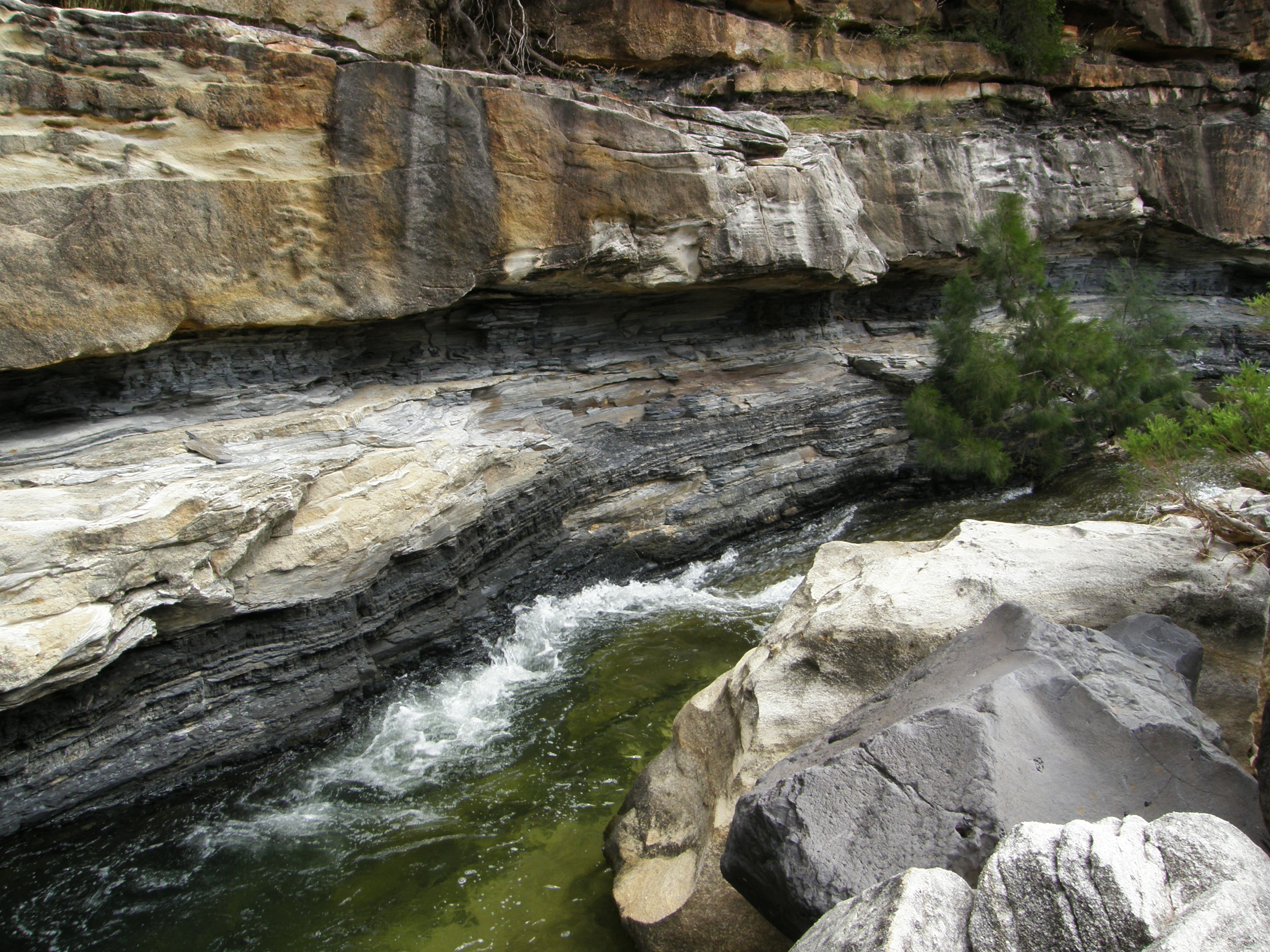
- Coal seams in Porcupine Gorge

- Location within Queensland
- Depth: 40

Geology
- Type: Gorge

Geography
- Location: about 60 km north of Hughenden, Queensland, Australia
- Coordinates: 20°24′39.77″S 144°25′42.86″E
- Rivers: Galah Creek
- Interactive map of Porcupine Gorge

Porcupine Gorge is a gorge on Galah Creek in Porcupine, Shire of Flinders in North West Queensland, Australia. It is a protected area within the Porcupine Gorge National Park. Access to the gorge and national park is via the Kennedy Development Road.

The sandstone gorge has incised up to 40 m below the adjacent plateau surface. In winter the base of the gorge is a series of waterholes while in the wet season it becomes a raging cascade which has excavated a deep chasm.

There is an annual race held in the gorge called the Porcupine Gorge Challenge. It starts at the bottom of the gorge at The Pyramid.

The gorge is a natural attraction for a diverse array of birdlife.

== Stratigraphy ==
=== Betts Creek Beds ===
The Betts Creek Beds are located at the far end of the study area and are quite a small unit. The lower section is primarily interbedded siltstone and mudstone with coal seams formed within these layers. The coal itself is sub-bituminous and has well defined cleats with an overall waxy texture. Above these are larger mudstone beds which have well preserved fossil leaves of Glossopteris fauna, this is a clear Permian indicator and gives a good indication of the source of organic matter needed for coal formation.

Above these are sandstone beds with very clear channelization, the layers also have well defined load structures. Then proceeding upwards, the rest of the Betts Creek Beds is dominated by coarser grained sandstone with intermittent mudstone beds every few meters.

A normal fault cuts through the sandstone units and releases hydrothermal fluids, the way this is seen is that the sandstone present in the hanging wall is much whiter than the sandstone present in the footwall. The reasoning for this is that when the spring created by the fault released hydrothermal fluids into the system, the oxidizing iron(II) in the sandstone was leached into the fluid and transported elsewhere. On the footwall the iron(II) has not been transported away during the fault release. The fault has also produced a fault breccia culminating in downstream accretion with large clasts, indicating a high flow regime at the time of faulting.

From the lithology and structures present the system is thought to have originally begun as a swamp area with plenty of Glossopteris dying and producing an anaerobic system to produce the kerogen necessary. After time progresses, the system is flooded with sand moving with flooding waters. From this we know that the swamp area was close to the coastline, and then due to sea level rise in the area, flooded over burying the kerogen.

The fluvial channelization continued for some time, and created a larger channel, originally thought to be a boudin. This is disproved however by channelization in the upper parts of the formation. At periods of higher sea level herein, the sandstone was covered by muddy shales and these layers are distinguishable due to the fact that they are able to grow trees. Once the normal faulting has occurred, the kerogen becomes cracked, allowing coalification to take place. Pyrite present in the system would be removed from the beds and transported by the hydrothermal fluids as the iron(II) cation with dissolved sulfur in solution. This is the source of iron in the hydrothermal fluid.

=== Warang Sandstone ===
The Warang Sandstone is a litharenite sandstone unit within the gorge consisting of Early to Mid-Triassic fluvial channel deposits. One of the most interesting parts of the formation occurs at the contact between the Warang Sandstone and Betts Creek Beds.

In this area the sandstone has been fractured by a strike-slip fault system that has encouraged the release of the underlying hydrothermal fluids sourced from the Betts Creek Beds. Due to the leaching that has happened of the sandstone units below, the iron(II) must accrete somewhere, and this has happened along the faults, creating very dense, ferric build up in the sandstone pores.

Moving upwards from where the shearing outcrops, the destination of the fluids becomes apparent in an area that initially appears to have been folded however this is not the case at all. As the sandstone becomes fractured, it gets broken into segments, a sort of sedimentary box. These begin to trap the hydrothermal fluids, most especially the ferric components and the remaining solution escapes as water. The resulting “folded” pattern is in fact a boxwork concretion, and shows how the fluid has arrived at that point.

From this point upwards, the more distinct fluvial channels are present in abundance. These are primarily fine grained sandstone with infill of more coarse grained material. Interbedded mudstone and shale layers become compressed by the overlying sediments and these compress to become load structures. The channels contain finely laminated mud clasts that have been carried through, and due to being softer sediments, these have preferentially weathered leaving behind imprints of where they once lay. These continue upwards until reaching the point where much larger portions of sandstone have been removed exposing honeycomb structures and large overhangs in the sequence.

These are mainly as a result of modern-day flash flooding within the gorge, however the preface to this modern analogy also comes as a result of past channelization exposing the surfaces, as we know that the area is heavily influenced by fluvial channels. Within these upper beds the sandstone also undergoes a distinct colour change moving from a red to yellow to white sandstone, as a result of leaching and weathering processes. The higher up and further away in the Warang Sandstone, the more trough cross-stratification is observed. This becomes most noticeable in the White Mountains National Park as the trough cross stratification is most well preserved. The composition of the rock unit remains relatively uniform, however the amount of lithics increases the more distal from the source.

The deposition of sandstone during channelization of the coastline occurred leading to the area becoming a sequence of fining and coarsening sandstone. This further buried the Betts Creek Beds allowing more compaction of the kerogen prior to faulting, and continued the build-up of sediment with each channel filled in over time. These were covered afterwards by thicker sediments that created the trough cross stratification sitting on top; in the more distal part of the Warang Sandstone the trough cross stratification increases to the point of removing all traces of channelization and a clearer flow direction. The sandstone is then cut at the top by a thin mudstone layer as denoted by the fauna growing at the contact of the Warang and Blantyre Sandstones.

=== Blantyre Sandstone ===
The Blantyre Sandstone is the continuation of channelization into the Jurassic. The formation is not easy to observe at a close scale, however by using Figure 2 above and knowledge of the Warang Sandstone an accurate description can be made.

The channels are well preserved by coarse grained infill material, these are marked by parting lineations in the lower beds, and load structures in finely interbedded silty layers. Another feature that occurs within these are mudclasts that due to modern weathering have been removed to the point of having, what appear as, large gouges in the rock face. Within the upper part of the Blantyre formation trough cross stratification is present, and the angle of these troughs is in the order of around 25 degrees dipping in a north – south direction.

Due to the increasing jointing in the Blantyre, we can surmise that the sandstone is influenced very little by the hydrothermal fluids, and preferentially weathers mud clasts. The environment here is one that has not as much water moving through, and the jointed layering could be as a result of drought at the time.

This unit proceeds for some time until migrating alluvial fans cover the Blantyre Sandstone creating thick paraconglomerate layers above.

=== Gilbert River Formation ===
The Gilbert River Formation consists of paraconglomerate litharenite layers. In the lower part of the formation flaser cross bedding in fine grained sandstone is found in abundance, however a little further up the system becomes awash with volcanic and chert clasts typical of alluvial debris. These then are buried underneath fine grained material once more until a significant occurrence of fining upwards in thin layers shows a sharp change in depositional environment.

The formation proceeds to become much more coarse grained and large, pebble to cobble sized clasts are enclosed. These are also noted to be largely sedimentary and volcanic in origin. The paleocurrent values for the formation are also highly variable, denoting a high energy flow regime with sufficient force to move large amounts of sediment. This is shown well in Plate 10 below and the imbrication of these pebble clasts is a good indicator for flow direction.

From the state of the system it can be confirmed that the flow regime of the beds has changed over time, with the most definite change marked by the thin, fining upwards bedding. The most logical control on these being the fact that the formation has had an influx of fluids most likely from the coastline splaying out into an alluvial fan.

The final section of the Gilbert River Formation is baked by the overlying Sturgeon Basalt, and this has created the baked psammite layer at the top of the Gilbert River Formation.

== See also ==
- List of canyons
