= Culgoa Floodplain National Park =

National park in Australia

- IUCN category II (national park)
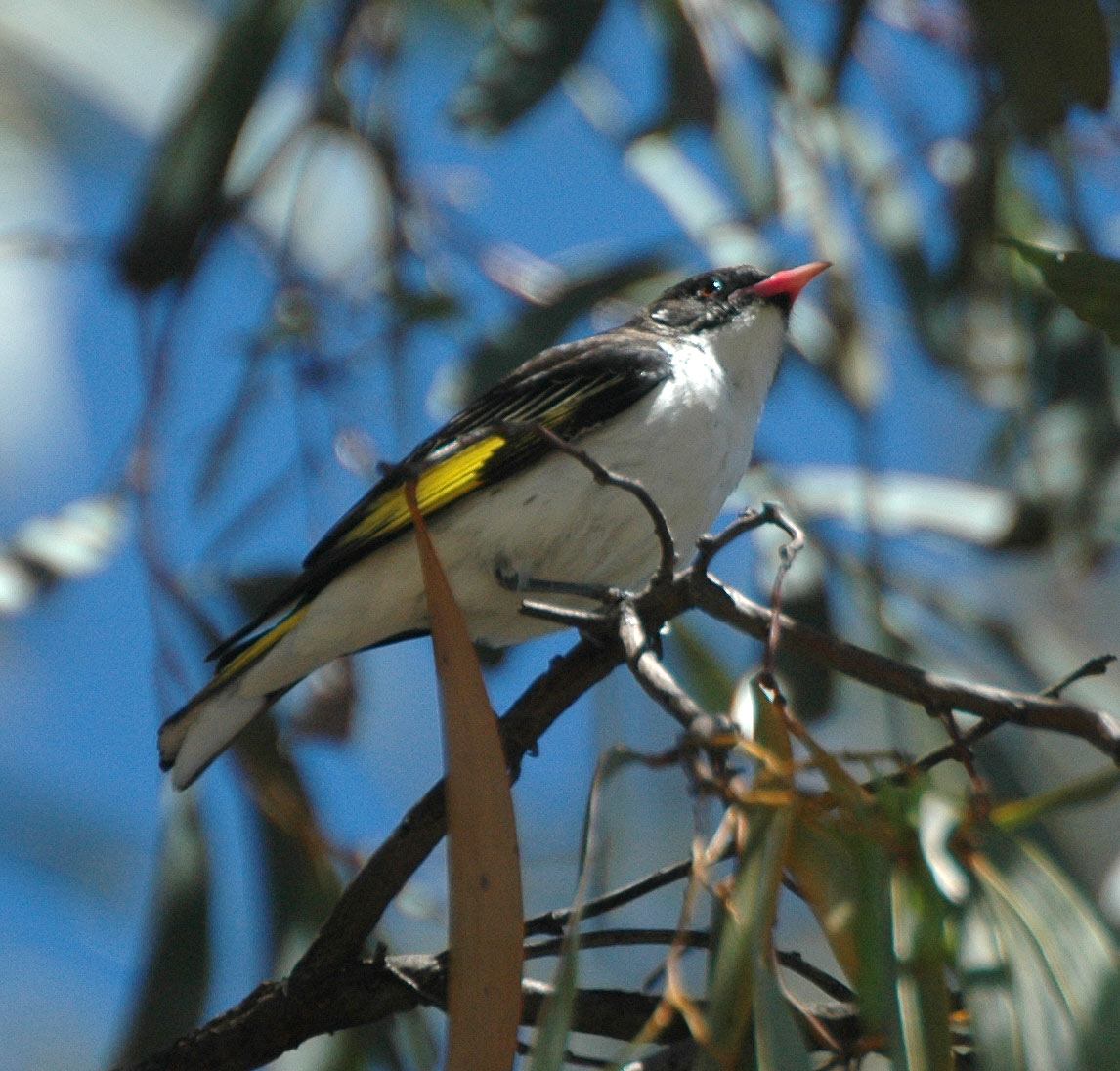
- Painted Honeyeater (Grantiella picta) Jandowae, S. Queensland, Australia

- Location within Queensland
- Location: Queensland
- Nearest city: Hebel
- Coordinates: 28°49′21″S 146°49′33″E
- Area: 428.59 km^{2} (165.48 sq mi)
- Established: 1994
- Governing body: Queensland Parks and Wildlife Service
- Website: http://www.nprsr.qld.gov.au/parks/culgoa-floodplain/

The Culgoa Floodplain National Park is a protected national park in the South West region of Queensland in eastern Australia. The 42,859-hectare (105,910-acre) national park is situated at the western extent of Hebel in the Shire of Balonne and in the east of Jobs Gate in the Paroo Shire, approximately 630 kilometres (390 mi) west of Brisbane. The park occupies the former pastoral and grazing property of Byra Station. The park's southern boundary is defined by part of the state border between Queensland and New South Wales.

== Location and features ==
In the eastern tip of the park, the waters of the Culgoa River may cause flooding. The west of the park lies within the catchment area of Nebine Creek. In some areas water from the Great Artesian Basin naturally rises to the surface, forming muddy pools.

The park is covered with diverse woodland vegetation. Stone tool scatters and cooking sites within the park are important reminders of the area's Aboriginal heritage. 150 species of bird have been identified in the park. Among others, there are ten honeyeaters, Australia's six species of woodswallow and parrots.

Bushwalking, birdwatching and other wildlife observing are the park's main recreational activities.

The Culgoa Floodplain National Park is only accessible by 4WD vehicles.

Camping is permitted however there are no facilities provided. There are no marked walking tracks.

The average elevation of the terrain is 142 metres.

== See also ==
- Protected areas of Queensland
