= Cubbie Station =

Landhold in Queensland, Australia

- Location within Queensland
- Type: Irrigated agriculture
- Location: near Dirranbandi, Queensland, Australia
- Coordinates: 28°42′21″S 147°52′28″E
- Area: 93,000 hectares (230,000 acres)
- Operator: CS Agriculture, a joint venture of Shandong Ruyi and MIRA

Cubbie Station, the largest irrigation property in Australia , is located near Dirranbandi, in south west Queensland, Australia. The station comprises 93,000 hectares (230,000 acres) and is operated by CS Agriculture, a joint venture between Macquarie Infrastructure and Real Assets (MIRA) (49%) and Shandong Ruyi (51%), a textile manufacturer owned by investors from China and Japan.

== Land holding ==
Cubbie Station is located on the Darling Riverine Plains bioregion. The topography of the region is defined by channels and floodplains of the upper reaches of the Darling and Barwon rivers.

Cotton was first produced in the region from the late 1970s. In 1983, Cubbie Station was converted from grazing purposes to cotton production. Cubbie Station comprises agricultural and non-agricultural lands; with approximately 22,000 hectares (54,000 acres) presently developed and a further 11,000 hectares (27,000 acres) under development.

On 29 October 2009, Cubbie Group Limited, the former owner of Cubbie Station, announced it would voluntarily enter administration on the following day. The company had incurred debts of over A$300 million, as a result of poor rainfall in the region in the preceding five years. Corporate recovery specialist, McGrathNicol, was appointed as administrator of the Cubbie Group on 30 October 2009.

On 31 August 2012 the Australian Government, on advice from the Foreign Investment Review Board, approved the sale of Cubbie Group, to a consortium comprising Shandong RuYi Scientific & Technological Group Co Ltd, a clothing and textile company owned by Chinese and Japanese investors, and Lempriere Group, an Australian family-owned company involved in wool trading and agricultural property management. The approval provided RuYi with an 80% initial ownership interest on condition that this interest be reduced to 51% within three years. The interest is to be sold to an independent third party. The consortium are bound by existing water licence conditions and the property is operated and managed by the Australian company using the existing workforce.

The purchase of Cubbie Station by foreign interests had the support of the major opposition party in the Australian Parliament, the Liberal Party. However, there was dissension amongst some members of the Nationals, who had concerns with foreign-ownership of agricultural land and water rights, claiming that the sale is not in Australia's national interest.

The purchase of Cubbie Group by the joint venture CS Agriculture was completed on 25 January 2013, for an estimated purchase price of A$240 million. In 2019 this sale was reversed and Shandong Ruyi sold 49% of Cubbie back to the Australian owned Macquarie Asset Management (MAM). In 2022, MAM acquired the remaining 51% stake in Cubbie Station, bringing its total ownership to 100%.

== Water rights ==
The station was created by amalgamating twelve floodplain properties to give Cubbie a total of fifty-one licences. The station's water storage dams stretch for more than 28 kilometres (17 mi) along the Culgoa River, within the Murray-Darling basin. In an average year the station uses 200,000 megalitres (7,100×10^{6} cu ft) of water, in a good year as much as 500,000 megalitres (18,000×10^{6} cu ft). The water is used to supply 130 square kilometres (50 sq mi) of irrigated cotton and other crops including wheat, which generates a net profit in the range of A$50 million to A$80 million a year.

The station is licensed to take 460,000 megalitres (16,000×10^{6} cu ft), the equivalent of all irrigation entitlements downstream in north-western NSW. The property has the capacity to grow 200 square kilometres (77 sq mi) of cotton. In 2006, the dams on the property were filled to 1% capacity allowing for only 200 hectares (490 acres) of cotton planting. The station is often derided for its large water usage requirements in a time of extreme drought in Australia and damage to the Murray Darling river system

As part of the 49% purchase by Macquarie Infrastructure and Real Assets (MIRA), CS Agriculture has agreed to voluntarily contribute 10 gigaliters of water to the Culgoa River without compensation.

As of January 2019, Cubbie Station has not harvested any water since April 2017, when it took 14GL of the 156GL that passed through St George but left more than 2GL of its entitlement to flow downstream. In March 2018, Cubbie passed on another 3GL it was entitled to take.

During his term as Minister for the Environment, Malcolm Turnbull did not rule out its possible acquisition by the Australian government.

== See also ==
- Agriculture in Australia
- Irrigation in Australia
- List of ranches and stations
