= HMAS Culgoa =

1945 River-class frigate

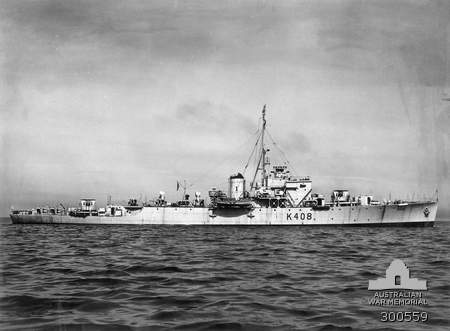
- Culgoa on Port Phillip in April 1947 shortly after commissioning

History

Australia
- Namesake: Culgoa River
- Builder: Williamstown Dockyard, Melbourne
- Laid down: 15 July 1943
- Launched: 22 September 1945
- Completed: 24 December 1946
- Commissioned: 1 April 1947
- Decommissioned: 15 April 1954
- Honours and awards: Battle honours: Korea 1953
- Fate: Sold for scrap in 1972

General characteristics
- Class & type: Modified River (or Bay)-class frigate
- Displacement: 1,537 tons (standard), 2,200 tons (full load)
- Length: 301 ft (92 m)
- Beam: 36 ft (11 m)
- Draught: 12 ft (3.7 m)
- Propulsion: Triple expansion, 2 shafts, 5,500 ihp (4,100 kW)
- Speed: 19.5 knots (36.1 km/h; 22.4 mph)
- Complement: 175
- Armament: 4 × 4-inch guns; 3 × 40 mm Bofors; 4 × 20 mm Oerlikons; 1 × Hedgehog; 4 × depth charge Throwers

HMAS Culgoa (K408/F408/A256), named for the Culgoa River, was a Modified River (or Bay)-class frigate that served in the Royal Australian Navy (RAN).

== Construction ==
Culgoa was laid down by Williamstown Dockyard, Melbourne on 15 July 1943, launched on 22 September 1945 by Mrs. Showers, wife of the Second Naval Member of the Australian Commonwealth Naval Board and completed on 24 December 1946. She was immediately placed in reserve until her commissioning on 1 April 1947.

== Operational history ==
Culgoa served in the Korean War. She received the battle honour "Korea 1953" for this deployment.

== Decommissioning and fate ==
Culgoa paid off into reserve on 15 April 1954, and used as an accommodation ship by personnel at HMAS Waterhen until she was sold for scrap to NW Kennedy of Vancouver, Canada on 15 February 1972. Culgoa left Sydney under tow for Taiwan in March 1972.
