= Culgoa National Park =

National park in New South Wales, Australia

- IUCN category II (national park)
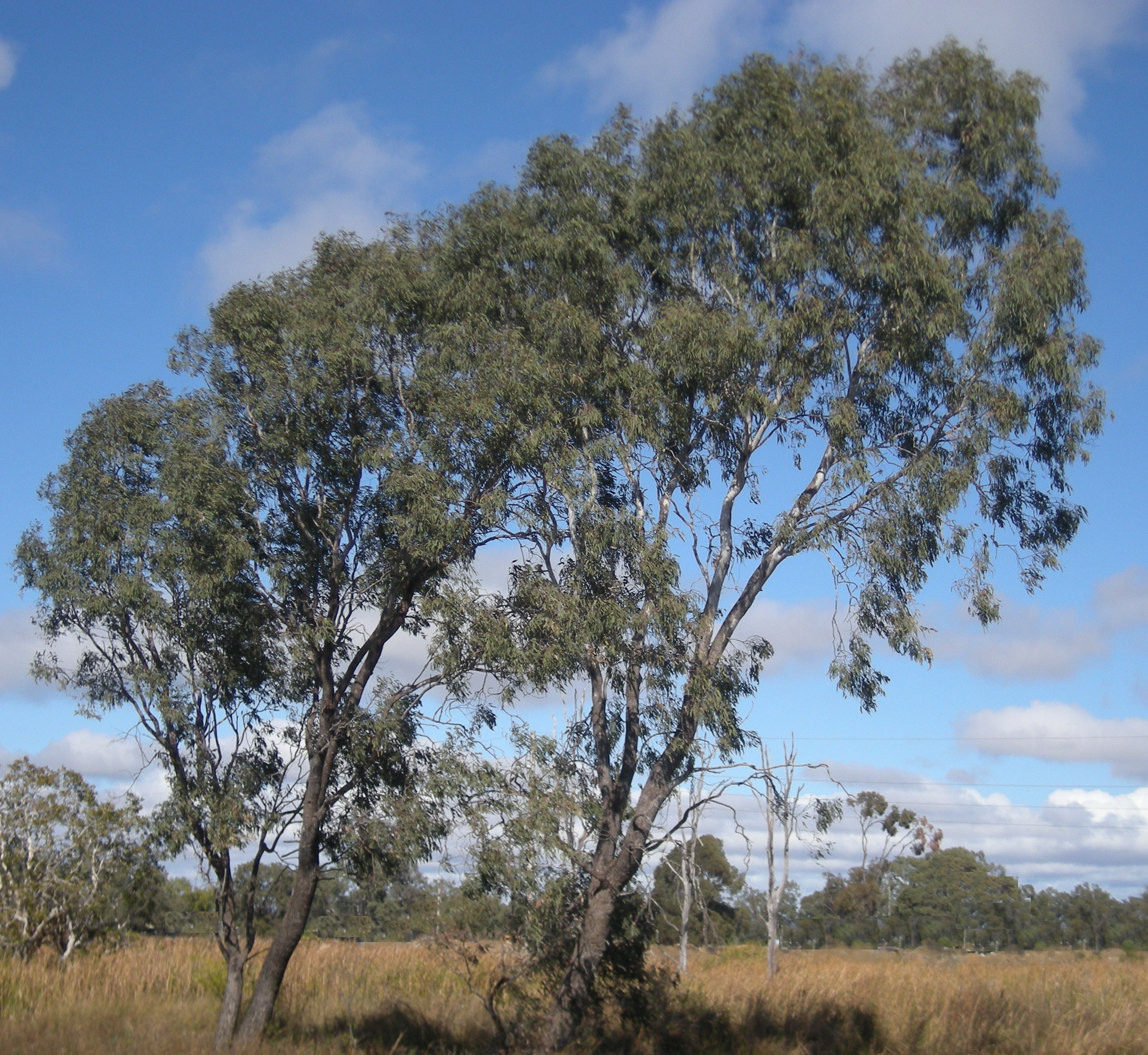
- Coolabah trees, renown in the national park

- Location within New South Wales
- Location: New South Wales
- Nearest city: Brewarrina
- Coordinates: 29°04′50″S 147°02′07″E
- Area: 352.39 km^{2} (136.06 sq mi)
- Established: April 1996
- Governing body: NSW National Parks & Wildlife Service
- Website: http://www.nationalparks.nsw.gov.au/culgoa-national-park

The Culgoa National Park is a protected national park in the north-west region of New South Wales, in eastern Australia. The 35,239-hectare (87,080-acre) national park is located approximately 660 kilometres (410 mi) northwest of Sydney. The nearest town is Brewarrina, 120 kilometres (75 mi) away. The park's northern boundary is defined by part of the state border between New South Wales and Queensland.

The Culgoa River flows through the national park.

The spirit of the history and culture of the Aboriginal people, who mostly worked as colonial pastoralists, can be felt here. The whole area of the park is full of relics of the pastoral and grazing industry of that time.

== Features ==
The national park, with its impressive river red gums and expansive floodplains, is the landscape that is thought to be representative of the Australian outback. The iconic coolabah tree, a native species, covers large sections of the park. In fact, no other national park in New South Wales has an area larger than the Culgoa's coolabah woodlands.

The park has numerous mammals, including the Common brushtail possum and Little pied bat (Chalinolobus picatus), a species of bat endemic to Australia.

The Culgoa National Park's birds present an irresistible lure for birdwatchers, who can glimpse many of the park's total of over 150 species. These include 10 species of honeyeaters and six of Australia's woodswallows.

== See also ==
- Protected areas of New South Wales
