= Porcupine Gorge National Park =

National park in Australia

- IUCN category II (national park)
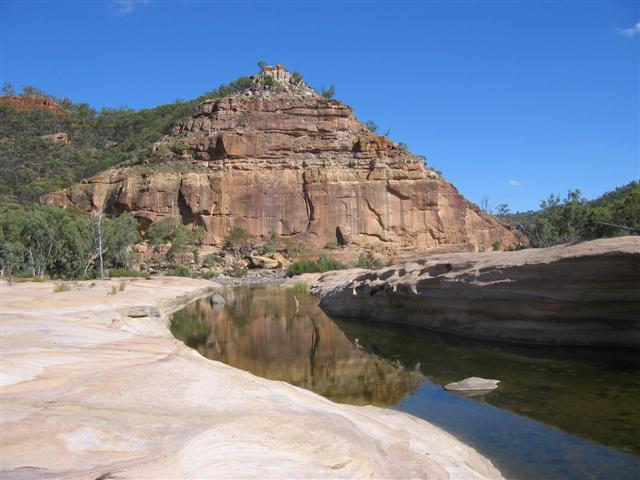
- Porcupine Gorge National Park

- Location within Queensland
- Location: Queensland
- Nearest city: Hughenden
- Coordinates: 20°23′57″S 144°26′25″E
- Area: 54.1 km^{2} (20.9 sq mi)
- Established: 1970
- Governing body: Queensland Parks and Wildlife Service
- Website: Official website

Porcupine Gorge National Park is a national park in Porcupine, Shire of Flinders in North West Queensland, Australia, 1,174 km northwest of Brisbane and 60 km north of Hughenden. Established in 1970, the national park has an area of 54.10 km^{2} and is managed by the Queensland Parks and Wildlife Service. It is an IUCN category II park.

The national park was established in the area surround Porcupine Gorge. The gorge features strata of sedimentary rocks which span hundreds of millions of years.

== Fauna ==
The park provides habitat for the rock-wallaby, Pacific black duck, crimson-winged parrot and black bittern.

== See also ==
- Protected areas of Queensland
