= Culgoa River =

River in Queensland, Australia

Culgoa
- Location of Culgoa River mouth in New South Wales
- Etymology: Aboriginal: "running through, returning"

Location
- Country: Australia
- States: Queensland, New South Wales
- Region: South West Queensland, Orana

Physical characteristics
- Source: Balonne River
  - location: near Dirranbandi
  - elevation: 187 m (614 ft)
- Mouth: confluence with the Barwon River to form the Darling River
  - location: north–west of Bourke
  - coordinates: 29°57′29″S 146°18′28″E
  - elevation: 109 m (358 ft)
- Length: 489 km (304 mi)

Basin features
- River system: Darling River catchment, Murray–Darling basin
- Tributaries
  - left: Balonne River, Birrie River
- National parks: Culgoa Floodplain National Park; Culgoa National Park

The Culgoa River is a river that is part of the Darling catchment within the Murray–Darling basin, in South West Queensland.

== Course and features ==
The river is a continuation of the western branch of the Balonne River in southern Queensland, near Dirranbandi, and flows generally south-west across parts of the Darling Riverine Plains, joined by ten tributaries, including the Balonne and Birrie rivers, before forming its confluence with the Darling River near Bourke, descending 78 metres (256 ft) over its 489-kilometre (304 mi) course.

Cubbie Station, located on the Culgoa River, is situated adjacent to a large diversion channel which permits the farm, under licence to store 460,000 megalitres (16,000×10^{6} cu ft) of river water. According to downstream farmers in 2008, large cotton farms, such as Cubbie Station, have reduced the traditional flow of the Culgoa River by one third. By 2009, downstream farmers were claiming that due to upstream water entitlements on the Culgoa River, since 2000, the Lower Balonne floodplain had not received enough water to flood the plains. Prior to the granting of these rights, the Lower Balonne River flooded every two or three years; impacting the sustainability of flora, fauna, birdlife, and economic returns from grazing livestock and cropping.

Little Culgoa Creek, an anabranch of the Culgoa River, leaves the river near Goodooga and returns to the river near Brenda Gate. The river flows through the Culgoa Floodplain National Park and the Culgoa National Park, located respectively north and south of the border between Queensland and New South Wales, west of Goodooga.

== Etymology ==
Culgoa is an Aboriginal word meaning "running through" or "returning".

== See also ==
- HMAS Culgoa (K408)
- List of rivers of Australia § Queensland
- Rivers of New South Wales
