= Nandewar County =

Nandewar New South Wales
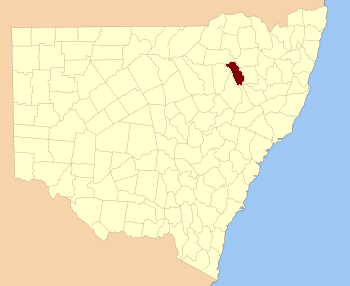
- Location in New South Wales
Lands administrative divisions around Nandewar:
Jamison	Courallie	Murchison
White	Nandewar	Darling
Pottinger	Buckland	Parry

Nandewar County is one of the 141 cadastral divisions of New South Wales. It is located to the east of the Namoi River, with Narrabri at the north-west edge, and Gunnedah at the southern edge.

Nandewar County is named after the range of mountains called Nandewar by the local Aboriginals.

== Parishes ==
A full list of parishes found within this county; their current LGA and mapping coordinates to the approximate centre of each location is as follows:

Parish	LGA	Coordinates
Berrioye	Narrabri Shire	30°30′54″S 150°14′04″E
Billyena	Narrabri Shire	30°28′54″S 150°08′04″E
Boggabri	Narrabri Shire	30°39′49″S 150°07′06″E
Bollol	Narrabri Shire	30°35′54″S 150°17′04″E
Boorobil	Gunnedah Shire	30°56′54″S 150°24′04″E
Brentry	Gunnedah Shire	30°46′54″S 150°12′04″E
Bullawa	Narrabri Shire	30°17′54″S 149°59′04″E
Burburgate	Gunnedah Shire	30°54′24″S 150°14′04″E
Byar	Narrabri Shire	30°25′54″S 150°14′04″E
Connor	Narrabri Shire	30°30′54″S 150°20′04″E
Coryah	Narrabri Shire	30°11′54″S 150°04′04″E
Deriah	Narrabri Shire	30°21′54″S 150°04′04″E
Durrisdeer	Narrabri Shire	30°29′54″S 150°00′04″E
Eulah	Narrabri Shire	30°21′54″S 150°00′04″E
Gunnenbeme	Gunnedah Shire	30°52′54″S 150°25′04″E
Killarney	Narrabri Shire	30°14′54″S 149°59′04″E
Leard	Narrabri Shire	30°34′54″S 150°08′04″E
Lindesay	Gwydir Shire	30°29′54″S 150°18′04″E
Mihi	Narrabri Shire	30°35′54″S 150°22′04″E
Moonbill	Narrabri Shire	30°12′54″S 149°56′04″E
Narrabri	Narrabri Shire	30°14′54″S 149°49′04″E
Ningadhun	Narrabri Shire	30°14′54″S 150°07′04″E
Rangira	Gunnedah Shire	30°36′54″S 150°25′04″E
Rusden	Narrabri Shire	30°20′54″S 150°11′04″E
Therribri	Narrabri Shire	30°32′54″S 150°04′04″E
Tippereena	Narrabri Shire	30°20′54″S 149°53′04″E
Tulcumba	Gunnedah Shire	30°44′54″S 150°20′04″E
Vickery	Narrabri Shire	30°43′54″S 150°14′04″E
Wallah	Narrabri Shire	30°26′54″S 149°58′04″E
Wean	Narrabri Shire	30°39′54″S 150°14′04″E
Weetaliba	Gunnedah Shire	30°54′54″S 150°18′04″E
Willuri	Gunnedah Shire	30°42′54″S 150°23′04″E
Yarrari	Gunnedah Shire	30°49′54″S 150°22′04″E
