= Benarba County =

Benarba New South Wales
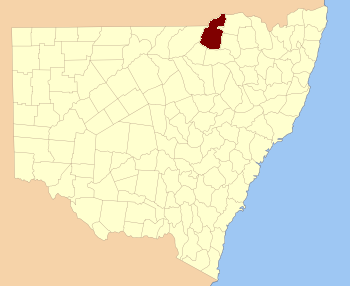
- Location in New South Wales
Lands administrative divisions around Benarba:
Queensland	Queensland	Stapylton
Finch	Benarba	Courallie
Denham	Jamison	Courallie

Benarba County is one of the 141 cadastral divisions of New South Wales.

Benarba is believed to be derived from a local Aboriginal word.

== Parishes within this county ==
A full list of parishes found within this county; their current LGA and mapping coordinates to the approximate centre of each location is as follows:

Parish	LGA	Coordinates
Balerang	Moree Plains Shire	29°01′54″S 149°25′04″E
Ballalla	Moree Plains Shire	29°04′54″S 149°19′04″E
Banarway	Moree Plains Shire	29°18′54″S 148°45′04″E
Baroona	Moree Plains Shire	29°11′54″S 149°31′04″E
Bibble	Moree Plains Shire	29°06′54″S 148°50′04″E
Biroo	Moree Plains Shire	29°17′54″S 149°00′04″E
Boolmuckledi	Moree Plains Shire	29°03′54″S 149°15′04″E
Boomi	Moree Plains Shire	28°42′54″S 149°23′04″E
Boonaldoon	Moree Plains Shire	29°29′04″S 149°24′48″E
Boonangar	Moree Plains Shire	28°38′54″S 149°32′04″E
Boonerey	Moree Plains Shire	29°11′54″S 148°52′04″E
Boonoona	Moree Plains Shire	29°10′54″S 149°36′04″E
Boronga	Moree Plains Shire	28°46′54″S 149°40′04″E
Boroo	Moree Plains Shire	28°47′54″S 149°14′04″E
Boyanga	Moree Plains Shire	29°09′54″S 149°14′04″E
Brigalow	Moree Plains Shire	28°56′54″S 149°32′04″E
Bucknel	Moree Plains Shire	29°00′54″S 149°01′04″E
Bunarba	Moree Plains Shire	29°00′54″S 149°13′04″E
Bundori	Moree Plains Shire	28°42′54″S 149°28′04″E
Bunna Bunna	Narrabri Shire	29°45′54″S 149°14′04″E
Burragillo	Moree Plains Shire	29°27′54″S 149°09′04″E
Burrandoon	Moree Plains Shire	29°24′54″S 149°08′04″E
Caidmurra	Moree Plains Shire	29°13′54″S 148°47′04″E
Carbeenbri	Moree Plains Shire	29°34′54″S 149°17′04″E
Carraa	Moree Plains Shire	29°01′54″S 149°36′04″E
Collymongle	Moree Plains Shire	29°26′54″S 148°44′04″E
Collyu	Moree Plains Shire	29°09′54″S 149°08′04″E
Cook	Walgett Shire	29°35′54″S 148°44′04″E
Cooloobong	Moree Plains Shire	28°50′54″S 149°40′04″E
Coonalgra	Moree Plains Shire	29°13′54″S 149°03′04″E
Coubal	Moree Plains Shire	28°55′54″S 149°26′04″E
Cowmerton	Moree Plains Shire	28°49′54″S 149°27′04″E
Crinoline	Moree Plains Shire	29°13′54″S 149°08′04″E
Cudgildool	Moree Plains Shire	29°22′54″S 149°25′04″E
Currah	Moree Plains Shire	28°55′54″S 149°22′04″E
Currotha	Moree Plains Shire	29°34′54″S 149°02′04″E
Currygundi	Moree Plains Shire	29°13′54″S 149°15′04″E
Dangar	Walgett Shire	29°37′54″S 148°50′04″E
Derra	Moree Plains Shire	29°28′54″S 149°13′04″E
Dindierna	Moree Plains Shire	28°54′54″S 149°13′04″E
Direlmabildi	Moree Plains Shire	29°20′54″S 149°09′04″E
Doorabeeba	Moree Plains Shire	29°46′54″S 149°23′04″E
Dundunga	Moree Plains Shire	29°09′54″S 149°03′04″E
Galloway	Moree Plains Shire	29°05′54″S 149°01′04″E
Gil Gil	Moree Plains Shire	29°05′54″S 149°10′04″E
Gin	Moree Plains Shire	29°19′54″S 149°15′04″E
Gingham	Moree Plains Shire	29°14′54″S 149°21′04″E
Goocalla	Moree Plains Shire	29°06′54″S 149°24′04″E
Gorman	Walgett Shire	29°42′54″S 148°55′04″E
Greaves	Moree Plains Shire	28°55′54″S 149°36′04″E
Greenaway	Moree Plains Shire	29°27′54″S 148°50′04″E
Gunathera	Moree Plains Shire	29°28′54″S 148°52′04″E
Hamilton	Moree Plains Shire	28°50′54″S 149°10′04″E
Hill	Moree Plains Shire	29°34′54″S 148°57′04″E
Kamilaroi	Walgett Shire	29°31′54″S 148°41′04″E
Keelo	Moree Plains Shire	29°23′54″S 148°44′04″E
Krui	Moree Plains Shire	29°41′54″S 149°24′04″E
Kunopia	Moree Plains Shire	28°41′54″S 149°36′04″E
Mallowa	Moree Plains Shire	29°34′54″S 149°07′04″E
Markham	Narrabri Shire	29°44′54″S 149°08′04″E
Meei	Moree Plains Shire	29°29′54″S 148°48′04″E
Meero	Moree Plains Shire	29°24′54″S 149°15′04″E
Meroe	Moree Plains Shire	29°24′54″S 149°15′04″E
Millebee	Moree Plains Shire	29°39′54″S 149°15′04″E
Mongyer	Moree Plains Shire	29°35′54″S 149°12′04″E
Moomin	Moree Plains Shire	29°39′54″S 149°07′04″E
Moorina	Moree Plains Shire	29°08′54″S 149°31′04″E
Mungi	Moree Plains Shire	29°38′54″S 149°02′04″E
Myall	Moree Plains Shire	29°17′54″S 148°50′04″E
Narrawall	Moree Plains Shire	29°03′54″S 149°06′04″E
Neargo	Moree Plains Shire	29°24′54″S 149°03′04″E
Newcastle	Moree Plains Shire	28°45′54″S 149°32′04″E
Noonah	Moree Plains Shire	29°11′54″S 149°24′04″E
Noora	Moree Plains Shire	28°37′54″S 149°30′04″E
Numby Numby	Moree Plains Shire	29°19′54″S 149°04′04″E
Oreel	Walgett Shire	29°44′54″S 149°02′04″E
Pearse	Moree Plains Shire	29°22′54″S 148°52′04″E
Pially	Moree Plains Shire	29°37′54″S 148°54′04″E
Single	Moree Plains Shire	29°34′54″S 149°24′04″E
Tala	Moree Plains Shire	29°00′54″S 149°20′04″E
Tellaraga	Moree Plains Shire	29°31′54″S 149°25′04″E
Tiela	Moree Plains Shire	29°23′54″S 149°20′04″E
Tillaloo	Moree Plains Shire	29°13′54″S 149°26′04″E
Turrawah	Moree Plains Shire	29°00′54″S 149°07′04″E
Tycawina	Moree Plains Shire	28°37′54″S 149°37′04″E
Tyrrell	Moree Plains Shire	28°46′54″S 149°37′04″E
Umbri	Moree Plains Shire	28°51′54″S 149°10′04″E
Uranbah	Moree Plains Shire	29°39′54″S 149°10′04″E
Wadden	Moree Plains Shire	29°00′54″S 149°31′04″E
Wandoona	Moree Plains Shire	29°19′54″S 149°21′04″E
Warren	Moree Plains Shire	29°13′54″S 149°12′04″E
Werrina	Moree Plains Shire	28°43′54″S 149°18′04″E
Whalan	Moree Plains Shire	28°50′54″S 149°34′04″E
Willalee	Moree Plains Shire	29°28′54″S 149°02′04″E
Winslow	Moree Plains Shire	28°48′54″S 149°22′04″E
Wirra North	Moree Plains Shire	29°23′54″S 149°00′04″E
Wirrir South	Moree Plains Shire	29°28′54″S 148°57′04″E
Wirrit	Moree Plains Shire	29°19′54″S 149°26′04″E
Wolongimba	Moree Plains Shire	29°41′54″S 149°19′04″E
Yarouah	Moree Plains Shire	29°01′54″S 149°03′04″E
Yarrol	Moree Plains Shire	29°09′54″S 149°18′04″E
Young	Moree Plains Shire	29°12′54″S 149°01′04″E
