= White County, New South Wales =

White New South Wales
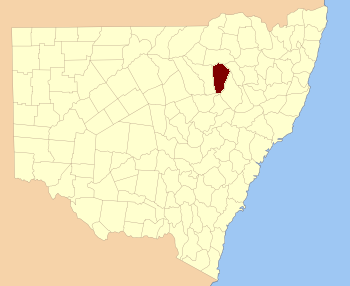
- Location in New South Wales
Lands administrative divisions around White:
Jamison	Jamison	Nandewar
Baradine	White	Pottinger
Gowen	Napier	Pottinger

White County is one of the 141 cadastral divisions of New South Wales. It is located to the south of the Namoi River along both sides of Bohena Creek, with Narrabri at the northern end. It includes most of the Pilliga Nature Reserve.

White County was named in honour of the surveyor and diarist George Boyle White (1802–1876).

== Parishes within this county ==
A full list of parishes found within this county; their current LGA and mapping coordinates to the approximate centre of each location is as follows:

Parish	LGA	Coordinates
Arrarownie	Narrabri Shire	30°44′54″S 149°20′04″E
Belmore	Narrabri Shire	30°24′54″S 149°18′04″E
Blake	Narrabri Shire	30°26′54″S 149°43′04″E
Bohena	Narrabri Shire	30°25′54″S 149°37′04″E
Borah	Warrumbungle Shire	31°05′54″S 149°36′04″E
Boral	Narrabri Shire	30°20′54″S 149°38′04″E
Brigalow	Narrabri Shire	30°31′54″S 149°42′04″E
Bulgarra	Narrabri Shire	30°19′54″S 149°15′04″E
Capp	Narrabri Shire	30°25′54″S 149°24′04″E
Cocaboy	Narrabri Shire	30°46′54″S 149°33′04″E
Coghill	Narrabri Shire	30°31′54″S 149°17′04″E
Cook	Narrabri Shire	30°32′54″S 149°22′04″E
Cooma	Narrabri Shire	30°20′54″S 149°43′04″E
Coormore	Warrumbungle Shire	30°54′54″S 149°21′04″E
Cowallah	Narrabri Shire	30°40′54″S 149°36′04″E
Cox	Warrumbungle Shire	31°00′54″S 149°35′04″E
Crowie	Narrabri Shire	30°29′54″S 149°35′04″E
Dampier	Narrabri Shire	30°29′54″S 149°30′04″E
Dangar	Narrabri Shire	30°44′54″S 149°30′04″E
Denobollie	Narrabri Shire	30°48′54″S 149°19′04″E
Dewhurst	Narrabri Shire	30°46′54″S 149°42′04″E
Galloway	Narrabri Shire	30°45′54″S 149°35′04″E
Goona	Narrabri Shire	30°35′54″S 149°35′04″E
Gorman	Narrabri Shire	30°31′54″S 149°50′04″E
Gurleigh	Narrabri Shire	30°14′54″S 149°32′04″E
Humphrey	Warrumbungle Shire	30°57′54″S 149°26′04″E
Iredale	Warrumbungle Shire	30°53′54″S 149°35′04″E
Lloyd	Narrabri Shire	30°52′54″S 148°26′04″E
Loder	Narrabri Shire	30°19′54″S 149°21′04″E
Loftus	Warrumbungle Shire	30°54′54″S 149°30′04″E
Mallallee	Narrabri Shire	30°47′54″S 149°30′04″E
Mallee	Unincorporated	34°53′14″S 143°24′54″E
Manum	Warrumbungle Shire	31°06′54″S 149°30′04″E
Milner	Narrabri Shire	30°27′54″S 149°50′04″E
Mollee	Narrabri Shire	30°16′54″S 149°39′04″E
Mollieroi	Narrabri Shire	30°38′54″S 149°20′04″E
Nuable	Narrabri Shire	30°35′54″S 149°30′04″E
Orr	Warrumbungle Shire	31°00′54″S 149°30′04″E
Parkes	Narrabri Shire	30°39′54″S 149°47′04″E
Quinn	Narrabri Shire	30°19′54″S 149°32′04″E
Robertson	Narrabri Shire	30°19′54″S 149°26′04″E
Tannawanda	Warrumbungle Shire	31°02′54″S 149°24′04″E
Turrawan	Narrabri Shire	30°28′54″S 149°54′04″E
Wee Waa	Narrabri Shire	30°12′54″S 149°28′04″E
White	Narrabri Shire	30°40′54″S 149°41′04″E
Yaminba	Warrumbungle Shire	31°08′54″S 149°24′04″E
Yaraman	Narrabri Shire	30°39′54″S 149°30′04″E
