= County of Marsh =

Marsh Queensland
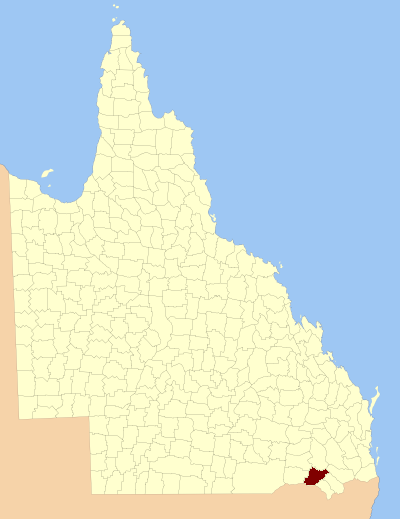
- Location within Queensland
Lands administrative divisions around Marsh:
Pring	Derby	Merivale
Carnarvon	Marsh	Bentinck
Stapylton (NSW)	Arrawatta (NSW)	Clive

The County of Marsh is a county (a cadastral division) in the southern Darling Downs region of Queensland, Australia, on the state border with New South Wales. It was named and bounded by the Governor in Council on 7 March 1901 under the Land Act 1897.

== Parishes ==
Marsh is divided into parishes, as listed below:

Parish	LGA	Coordinates	Towns
Badgery	Goondiwindi	28°10′S 150°56′E	
Bendidee	Goondiwindi	28°17′S 150°33′E	
Bengalla	Goondiwindi	28°38′S 150°39′E	Yelarbon
Bringalily	Goondiwindi	28°14′S 151°06′E	
Commoron	Goondiwindi	28°24′S 150°23′E	
Curriba	Goondiwindi	28°25′S 150°43′E	
Eena	Goondiwindi	28°19′S 150°52′E	
Goondiwindi	Goondiwindi	28°31′S 150°22′E	Goondiwindi
Inglewood	Goondiwindi	28°21′S 151°03′E	
Kerimbilla	Goondiwindi	28°18′S 150°41′E	
Merawa	Goondiwindi	28°36′S 150°29′E	
Merinda	Goondiwindi	28°02′S 150°35′E	
Millmerran	Toowoomba	28°03′S 151°10′E	
Mingimarny	Toowoomba	28°08′S 151°10′E	
Moogoon	Goondiwindi	28°26′S 150°32′E	
Morennan	Goondiwindi	28°05′S 150°47′E	Kindon
Sands	Goondiwindi	28°30′S 150°51′E	Whetstone
Stonehenge	Toowoomba	28°06′S 151°19′E	Stonehenge
Whetstone	Goondiwindi	28°24′S 150°55′E	
Wondalli	Goondiwindi	28°33′S 150°40′E	
Wyaga	Goondiwindi	28°08′S 150°40′E	
Yagaburne	Goondiwindi	28°11′S 150°32′E	Yagaburne

== External links ==
- "Map of the County of Marsh". Queensland Government. 1923.
