= Jamison County =

Jamison
- Cadastral division
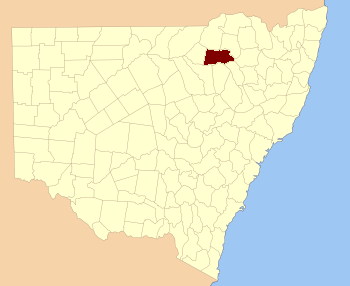
- Location in New South Wales
- Country: Australia
- State: New South Wales
Lands administrative divisions around Jamison
Benarba	Benarba	Courallie
Denham	Jamison	Murchison
Baradine	White	Nandewar

Jamison County is one of the 141 cadastral divisions of New South Wales. It is located to the north of the Namoi River, near Wee Waa.

Jamison County was named in honour of landowner and constitutional reformer Sir John Jamison (1776–1844).

== Parishes within this county ==
A full list of parishes found within this county; their current LGA and mapping coordinates to the approximate centre of each location is as follows:

Parish	LGA	Coordinates
Belar	Narrabri Shire	29°58′54″S 149°34′04″E
Bibil	Narrabri Shire	29°58′54″S 149°40′04″E
Billaboo South	Narrabri Shire	30°06′54″S 149°13′04″E
Billaboo	Narrabri Shire	30°00′54″S 149°15′04″E
Bobbiwaa	Narrabri Shire	30°09′54″S 149°49′04″E
Bolcarol	Narrabri Shire	30°01′54″S 149°19′04″E
Boorah	Narrabri Shire	29°56′54″S 149°46′04″E
Brigalow	Narrabri Shire	29°58′54″S 149°19′04″E
Bulyeroi	Narrabri Shire	29°53′54″S 149°23′04″E
Bunna	Narrabri Shire	29°51′54″S 149°15′04″E
Bunyah	Narrabri Shire	29°54′54″S 149°28′04″E
Burcarroll	Narrabri Shire	30°01′45″S 149°25′21″E
Burren East	Walgett Shire	30°04′17″S 149°00′38″E
Burren	Walgett Shire	29°54′54″S 148°55′04″E
Burrendong	Narrabri Shire	29°58′54″S 149°26′04″E
Clements	Narrabri Shire	29°49′54″S 149°07′04″E
Coolga	Walgett Shire	30°14′54″S 148°53′04″E
Coorong	Narrabri Shire	29°59′54″S 149°45′04″E
Cowimangarah	Narrabri Shire	30°03′54″S 150°03′04″E
Cubbaroo North	Narrabri Shire	30°11′36″S 149°05′31″E
Cubbaroo	Narrabri Shire	30°17′54″S 148°58′04″E
Dangar	Narrabri Shire	29°49′54″S 149°25′04″E
Dealwarraldi	Walgett Shire	29°59′54″S 149°01′04″E
Denham	Narrabri Shire	29°59′54″S 149°09′04″E
Dewhurst	Walgett Shire	30°03′54″S 148°54′04″E
Dobikin	Narrabri Shire	29°54′54″S 149°40′04″E
Doyle	Narrabri Shire	30°07′54″S 149°55′04″E
Drildool	Narrabri Shire	30°14′54″S 149°05′04″E
Eckford	Narrabri Shire	29°53′54″S 149°35′04″E
Edgeroi	Narrabri Shire	29°59′54″S 149°54′04″E
Galathera	Narrabri Shire	30°10′54″S 149°40′04″E
Gehan	Narrabri Shire	29°48′54″S 149°38′04″E
Gommel	Narrabri Shire	30°09′54″S 149°35′04″E
Graham	Walgett Shire	30°29′54″S 148°56′04″E
Gundemain	Narrabri Shire	30°04′54″S 149°30′04″E
Helebah	Narrabri Shire	30°08′28″S 149°25′03″E
Jamison	Walgett Shire	30°10′54″S 148°54′04″E
Keera	Narrabri Shire	30°05′54″S 149°45′04″E
Long Point	Narrabri Shire	30°03′42″S 149°07′59″E
Manamoi	Narrabri Shire	29°48′54″S 149°45′04″E
Markham	Narrabri Shire	29°48′54″S 149°16′04″E
Mellburra	Narrabri Shire	30°00′54″S 150°00′04″E
Merah North	Narrabri Shire	30°11′54″S 149°12′04″E
Merah	Narrabri Shire	30°14′54″S 149°12′04″E
Meriah	Narrabri Shire	30°05′54″S 149°37′04″E
Millie	Narrabri Shire	29°49′54″S 149°11′04″E
Moema	Narrabri Shire	30°02′54″S 149°56′04″E
Morgan	Walgett Shire	29°53′54″S 149°00′04″E
Myall Hollow	Narrabri Shire	29°54′54″S 149°50′04″E
Nowley	Narrabri Shire	29°56′54″S 149°11′04″E
Nundi	Narrabri Shire	30°05′54″S 149°52′04″E
Oreel	Walgett Shire	29°44′54″S 148°59′04″E
Oreel	Walgett Shire	29°48′54″S 149°02′04″E
Pian	Narrabri Shire	30°37′54″S 149°20′04″E
Queerbri	Narrabri Shire	30°08′54″S 149°30′04″E
Tarlee	Narrabri Shire	30°07′54″S 149°45′04″E
Thalaba	Narrabri Shire	29°51′54″S 149°30′04″E
Tulladunna	Narrabri Shire	30°11′49″S 149°22′38″E
Vickery	Narrabri Shire	29°55′54″S 149°05′04″E
Warrambool	Narrabri Shire	30°11′47″S 148°59′05″E
Waterloo	Narrabri Shire	29°52′54″S 149°51′04″E
Waugan	Narrabri Shire	30°00′54″S 149°39′04″E
Weeta Waa	Narrabri Shire	30°14′54″S 149°19′04″E
Woolabrar	Narrabri Shire	29°52′54″S 149°45′04″E
Yarranbar	Narrabri Shire	29°57′54″S 149°15′04″E
