= NSCR =

NSCR may refer to:

- EV12 North Sea Cycle Route, a long-distance cycling route
- North–South Commuter Railway, an urban rail line in Luzon, Philippines
- Netherlands Institute for the Study of Crime and Law Enforcement, a component of the Netherlands Organisation for Scientific Research
- National Sexuality Resource Center, a US-based advocacy organization
- Nova Scotia Central Railway, a predecessor of the Halifax and South Western Railway
- National Society for Cancer Relief, a British charity
- Narrabri Shire Community Radio, a community radio station in Narrabri, New South Wales, Australia
- National Security and Civil Rights Program, a program of the Asian Law Caucus
- National Security Capability Review, a British Defence evaluation from 2017 to 2018
