= Stapylton County =

Stapylton New South Wales
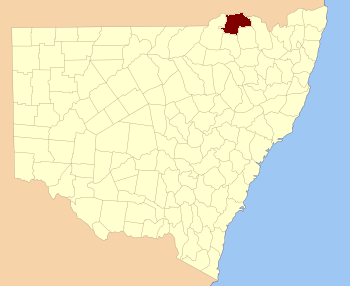
- Location in New South Wales
Lands administrative divisions around Stapylton:
Carnarvon (Qld)	Carnarvon (Qld)	Marsh (Qld)
Benarba	Stapylton	Arrawatta
Benarba	Courallie	Burnett

Stapylton County is one of the 141 cadastral divisions of New South Wales. It is located to the south of the Barwon River and includes part of the Newell Highway.

Stapylton County was named in honour of the geologist Granville William Chetwynd Stapylton (1800–1840).

== Parishes ==
A full list of parishes found within this county; their current LGA and mapping coordinates to the approximate centre of each location is as follows:

Parish	LGA	Coordinates
Adams	Moree Plains Shire	29°04′54″S 149°51′04″E
Bengerang	Moree Plains Shire	29°04′54″S 149°31′04″E
Benson	Moree Plains Shire	29°13′54″S 149°49′04″E
Blue Nobby	Gwydir Shire	29°55′54″S 150°38′04″E
Boggabilla	Moree Plains Shire	28°34′54″S 150°17′04″E
Boobera	Moree Plains Shire	28°37′54″S 150°08′04″E
Boonal	Gwydir Shire	29°45′54″S 150°32′04″E
Boonanga	Gwydir Shire	28°50′54″S 150°28′04″E
Booraba	Gwydir Shire	29°00′54″S 150°23′04″E
Browne	Moree Plains Shire	28°42′54″S 150°13′04″E
Bryanungra	Moree Plains Shire	29°05′54″S 149°57′04″E
Canary	Moree Plains Shire	28°39′54″S 149°52′04″E
Careunga	Moree Plains Shire	29°00′54″S 150°00′04″E
Careunga North	Moree Plains Shire	28°54′54″S 149°55′04″E
Carroby	Moree Plains Shire	28°38′54″S 150°01′04″E
Cook	Moree Plains Shire	28°46′54″S 150°19′04″E
Coolanga	Moree Plains Shire	28°49′54″S 150°10′04″E
Coppymurrumbill	Moree Plains Shire	28°48′54″S 150°17′04″E
Currumbah	Moree Plains Shire	28°53′54″S 150°10′04″E
Denebry	Moree Plains Shire	29°12′54″S 150°01′04″E
Douro	Moree Plains Shire	29°04′54″S 149°46′04″E
Finley	Moree Plains Shire	29°00′54″S 149°46′04″E
Gil Gil	Moree Plains Shire	29°08′54″S 150°12′04″E
Goorara	Moree Plains Shire	29°04′54″S 149°35′04″E
Gunnyanna	Moree Plains Shire	29°01′54″S 149°41′04″E
Harvey	Moree Plains Shire	29°16′54″S 150°02′04″E
Holmes	Gwydir Shire	28°59′54″S 150°18′04″E
Illingrammindi	Moree Plains Shire	28°50′54″S 150°00′04″E
Kinnimo	Moree Plains Shire	28°55′54″S 149°42′04″E
Lay Green	Moree Plains Shire	29°03′54″S 150°12′04″E
Limebon	Moree Plains Shire	28°46′54″S 150°05′04″E
Mayne	Moree Plains Shire	28°40′54″S 150°18′04″E
Melleallina	Moree Plains Shire	29°10′54″S 149°54′04″E
Merriwa	Moree Plains Shire	28°56′54″S 150°24′04″E
Mingan	Gwydir Shire	28°51′54″S 150°24′04″E
Mobbindry	Moree Plains Shire	28°47′54″S 150°24′04″E
Moppin	Moree Plains Shire	29°11′54″S 149°42′04″E
Morella	Moree Plains Shire	28°39′54″S 150°15′04″E
Mount Pleasant	Moree Plains Shire	29°03′54″S 150°04′04″E
Mungle	Gwydir Shire	28°52′54″S 150°16′04″E
Paine	Moree Plains Shire	28°59′54″S 150°02′04″E
Paleranga	Moree Plains Shire	28°40′54″S 149°45′04″E
Stapylton	Gwydir Shire	28°59′54″S 150°30′04″E
Tantarana	Moree Plains Shire	29°14′54″S 150°06′04″E
Toongcooma	Moree Plains Shire	28°59′54″S 150°13′04″E
Trinkey	Moree Plains Shire	28°38′54″S 150°02′04″E
Tubble Gah	Gwydir Shire	29°51′54″S 150°37′04″E
Tucka Tucka	Gwydir Shire	29°45′54″S 150°37′04″E
Tulloona	Moree Plains Shire	28°52′54″S 150°04′04″E
Tun Cooey	Moree Plains Shire	29°08′54″S 150°05′04″E
Wallon	Moree Plains Shire	29°13′54″S 149°55′04″E
Warra Warrama	Moree Plains Shire	29°00′54″S 150°07′04″E
Welbon	Moree Plains Shire	29°09′54″S 149°45′04″E
Whalan	Moree Plains Shire	28°45′54″S 150°24′04″E
Willimill	Moree Plains Shire	28°48′54″S 149°46′04″E
Wonga	Moree Plains Shire	28°46′54″S 150°13′04″E
Yooloobil	Moree Plains Shire	28°47′54″S 149°54′04″E
