= Pottinger County =

Pottinger
- Cadastral division
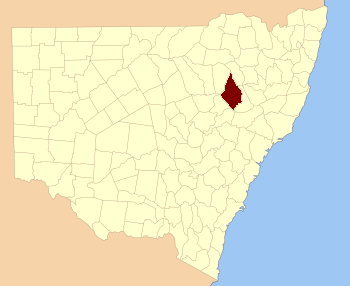
- Location in New South Wales
- Country: Australia
- State: New South Wales
Lands administrative divisions around Pottinger
White	Nandewar	Nandewar
Gowen	Pottinger	Buckland
Napier	Bligh	Brisbane

Pottinger County is one of the 141 cadastral divisions of New South Wales. It is located to the south west of the Namoi River and Mooki River, near Gunnedah.

Pottinger County was named in honour of the first Governor of Hong Kong Sir Henry Pottinger, first Baronet (1789–1856).

== Parishes ==
A full list of parishes found within this county; their current local government areas of Australia (LGA) and mapping coordinates to the approximate centre of each location is as follows:

Parish	LGA	Coordinates
Baan Baa	Narrabri Shire	30°36′54″S 150°01′04″E
Bando	Gunnedah Shire	31°08′54″S 150°00′04″E
Benelabri	Gunnedah Shire	30°55′54″S 150°00′04″E
Bingle	Gunnedah Shire	31°14′54″S 149°51′04″E
Black Jack	Gunnedah Shire	31°02′54″S 150°14′04″E
Boggabri	Narrabri Shire	30°41′54″S 150°00′04″E
Bomera	Warrumbungle Shire	31°28′54″S 149°51′04″E
Breeza	Gunnedah Shire	31°13′54″S 150°24′04″E
Brennan	Warrumbungle Shire	31°40′54″S 149°54′04″E
Brigalow	Warrumbungle Shire	30°59′54″S 149°45′04″E
Brothers	Gunnedah Shire	31°14′54″S 150°11′04″E
Brown	Gunnedah Shire	31°11′54″S 150°12′04″E
Bulga	Warrumbungle Shire	31°14′54″S 149°42′04″E
Bundella	Liverpool Plains Shire	31°38′54″S 149°57′04″E
Calala	Gunnedah Shire	31°14′54″S 150°03′04″E
Clarke	Warrumbungle Shire	31°34′54″S 149°51′04″E
Clift	Gunnedah Shire	31°17′54″S 150°21′04″E
Coogal	Warrumbungle Shire	31°00′54″S 149°52′04″E
Coolanbilla	Liverpool Plains Shire	31°24′54″S 150°08′04″E
Coomoo Coomoo	Liverpool Plains Shire	31°39′54″S 150°08′04″E
Curlewis	Gunnedah Shire	31°08′54″S 151°20′04″E
Denison West	Narrabri Shire	30°52′54″S 149°43′04″E
Denison	Gunnedah Shire	30°52′54″S 149°52′04″E
Digby	Gunnedah Shire	31°07′54″S 150°12′04″E
Doona	Gunnedah Shire	31°20′54″S 150°20′04″E
Dubbleda	Gunnedah Shire	30°50′54″S 150°06′04″E
Garrawilla	Warrumbungle Shire	31°07′54″S 149°40′04″E
Ghoolendaadi	Gunnedah Shire	30°50′54″S 149°59′04″E
Gill	Gunnedah Shire	31°01′54″S 150°08′04″E
Goally	Warrumbungle Shire	31°06′54″S 149°49′04″E
Goragilla	Warrumbungle Shire	31°16′54″S 149°40′04″E
Goran	Gunnedah Shire	31°11′54″S 150°04′04″E
Gulligal	Narrabri Shire	30°44′54″S 150°02′04″E
Gunnedah	Gunnedah Shire	30°59′54″S 150°10′04″E
Howes Hill	Liverpool Plains Shire	31°14′54″S 150°08′04″E
Johnston	Gunnedah Shire	31°04′54″S 150°20′04″E
Kickerbell	Liverpool Plains Shire	31°29′54″S 150°21′04″E
Lawson	Liverpool Plains Shire	31°32′54″S 150°00′04″E
Melville	Gunnedah Shire	30°59′54″S 150°00′04″E
Mema	Liverpool Plains Shire	31°29′54″S 150°05′04″E
Merrigula	Gunnedah Shire	31°16′54″S 149°55′04″E
Millie	Gunnedah Shire	30°57′54″S 150°04′04″E
Moredevil	Liverpool Plains Shire	32°38′54″S 150°04′04″E
Mucca Mucca	Warrumbungle Shire	31°15′54″S 149°36′04″E
Nea	Gunnedah Shire	31°13′54″S 150°17′04″E
Nombi	Warrumbungle Shire	31°10′54″S 149°46′04″E
Premer	Warrumbungle Shire	31°25′54″S 149°55′04″E
Pringle	Liverpool Plains Shire	31°32′54″S 150°04′04″E
Rodd	Liverpool Plains Shire	31°29′54″S 150°12′04″E
Saltwater	Warrumbungle Shire	31°27′54″S 149°47′04″E
Springfield	Liverpool Plains Shire	31°25′54″S 150°14′04″E
Tamarang	Liverpool Plains Shire	31°20′54″S 149°57′04″E
Tambar	Warrumbungle Shire	31°22′54″S 149°51′04″E
Tinkrameanah	Warrumbungle Shire	31°20′54″S 149°39′04″E
Trinkey	Liverpool Plains Shire	31°24′54″S 150°03′04″E
Tulla Mullen	Narrabri Shire	30°37′54″S 149°55′04″E
Urangera	Warrumbungle Shire	31°16′54″S 149°47′04″E
Walla Walla West	Narrabri Shire	30°45′54″S 149°49′04″E
Walla Walla	Narrabri Shire	30°45′54″S 149°55′04″E
Weston	Liverpool Plains Shire	31°26′54″S 150°23′04″E
Willala	Narrabri Shire	30°41′54″S 149°54′04″E
Wilson	Warrumbungle Shire	31°22′54″S 149°44′04″E
Wondoba	Gunnedah Shire	31°06′54″S 150°05′04″E
Yarraman	Liverpool Plains Shire	31°37′54″S 150°12′04″E
