= Courallie County =

Courallie New South Wales
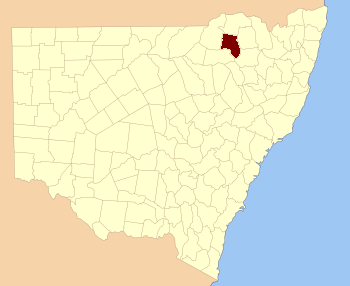
- Location in New South Wales
Lands administrative divisions around Courallie:
Benarba	Stapylton	Burnett
Benarba	Courallie	Burnett
Jamison	Jamison	Murchison

Courallie County is one of the 141 cadastral divisions of New South Wales.

Courallie is believed to be derived from a local Aboriginal word.

== Parishes ==
A full list of parishes found within this county; their current LGA and mapping coordinates to the approximate centre of each location is as follows:

Parish	LGA	Coordinates
Ardgowan	Moree Plains Shire	29°24′54″S 150°04′04″E
Barton	Moree Plains Shire	29°47′54″S 150°00′04″E
Berrygill	Moree Plains Shire	29°59′54″S 150°10′04″E
Biniguy	Moree Plains Shire	29°29′54″S 150°08′04″E
Bogree	Moree Plains Shire	29°19′54″S 149°48′04″E
Bombell	Narrabri Shire	29°59′54″S 150°04′04″E
Boo Boo	Moree Plains Shire	29°54′54″S 149°56′04″E
Boolooroo	Moree Plains Shire	29°20′54″S 149°56′04″E
Booramine	Moree Plains Shire	29°46′02″S 149°28′04″E
Bowman	Moree Plains Shire	29°47′54″S 150°14′04″E
Bullerana	Moree Plains Shire	29°25′54″S 149°34′04″E
Bumble	Moree Plains Shire	29°44′54″S 149°39′04″E
Bundoowithidie	Moree Plains Shire	29°26′54″S 150°02′04″E
Burranbah	Moree Plains Shire	29°44′54″S 149°41′04″E
Campbell	Moree Plains Shire	29°51′54″S 150°11′04″E
Carore	Moree Plains Shire	29°22′54″S 149°46′04″E
Combadelo	Moree Plains Shire	29°35′54″S 149°40′04″E
Downs	Moree Plains Shire	29°51′54″S 150°06′04″E
Duckhole	Moree Plains Shire	29°55′54″S 150°14′04″E
Ellis	Moree Plains Shire	29°39′54″S 150°12′04″E
Fletcher	Moree Plains Shire	29°42′54″S 150°12′04″E
Gordon	Moree Plains Shire	29°45′54″S 149°35′04″E
Greenbah	Moree Plains Shire	29°27′54″S 149°40′04″E
Gurley	Moree Plains Shire	29°47′54″S 149°57′04″E
Gurrygedah	Moree Plains Shire	29°44′54″S 150°00′04″E
Gyan	Moree Plains Shire	29°42′54″S 150°05′04″E
Harvey	Moree Plains Shire	29°20′54″S 150°07′04″E
King	Moree Plains Shire	29°20′54″S 150°00′04″E
Medgun	Moree Plains Shire	29°17′54″S 149°43′04″E
Menadool	Moree Plains Shire	29°35′54″S 149°56′04″E
Mia Mia	Moree Plains Shire	29°26′54″S 150°00′04″E
Minnaminane	Moree Plains Shire	29°41′54″S 149°31′04″E
Mooee	Moree Plains Shire	29°26′54″S 149°47′04″E
Moree	Moree Plains Shire	29°27′54″S 149°50′04″E
Mungie Bundie	Moree Plains Shire	29°29′54″S 150°00′04″E
Nepickallina	Moree Plains Shire	29°36′54″S 149°34′04″E
Noona	Moree Plains Shire	29°22′54″S 149°41′04″E
Paramellowa	Moree Plains Shire	29°26′54″S 150°09′04″E
Peacumboul	Moree Plains Shire	29°38′54″S 149°45′04″E
Pringle	Moree Plains Shire	29°56′54″S 150°06′04″E
Smart	Moree Plains Shire	29°35′54″S 149°31′04″E
Talmoi	Moree Plains Shire	29°18′54″S 149°33′04″E
Terrergee	Moree Plains Shire	30°02′54″S 150°08′04″E
Terry Hie Hie	Moree Plains Shire	29°47′54″S 150°06′04″E
Tycannah	Moree Plains Shire	29°33′54″S 149°52′04″E
Wallanoll	Moree Plains Shire	29°28′54″S 149°44′04″E
Wathagar	Moree Plains Shire	29°28′54″S 149°33′04″E
Weah Waa	Moree Plains Shire	29°37′54″S 150°06′04″E
Wee Bulla Bulla	Moree Plains Shire	29°28′54″S 149°56′04″E
Whittaker	Moree Plains Shire	29°28′54″S 149°39′04″E
Windoondilla	Moree Plains Shire	29°45′54″S 149°51′04″E
Wirrigurldonga	Moree Plains Shire	29°40′54″S 149°54′04″E
Yarraman	Moree Plains Shire	29°14′54″S 149°33′04″E
Yatta	Moree Plains Shire	29°55′54″S 149°59′04″E
