= Baan Baa =

- Town
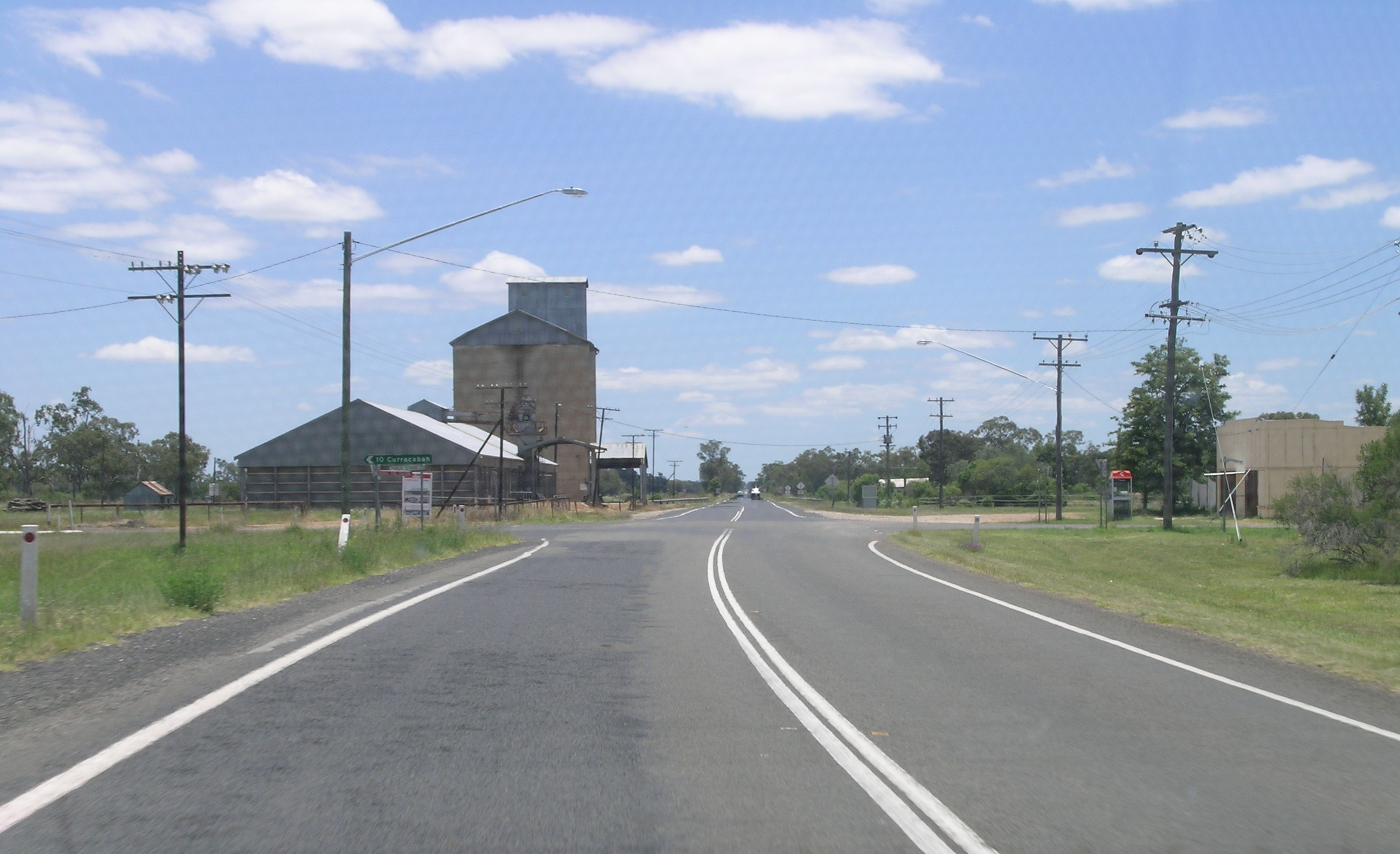
- Kamilaroi Highway, Baan Baa

- Coordinates: 30°36′S 149°56′E
- Country: Australia
- State: New South Wales
- LGA: Narrabri Shire
- Location: 19 km (12 mi) NNW of Boggabri; 38 km (24 mi) SE of Narrabri; 58 km (36 mi) NW of Gunnedah

Government
  - State electorate: Barwon, Tamworth
  - Federal division: Parkes
- Elevation: 236 m (774 ft)

Population
  - Total: 166 (2021 census)
- Postcode: 2390
- County: Pottinger
- Parish: Baan Baa

Baan Baa, pronounced "barn-bar", is a village located in northern inland New South Wales, Australia in Narrabri Shire local government area. It is approximately 38 kilometres (24 mi) south-east of Narrabri and 58 kilometres (36 mi) north-west of Gunnedah on the Kamilaroi Highway. In the 2021 census, Baan Baa had a population of 166.

== History ==
Baan Baa is named after a local property of the same name, and is Gamilaraay for "place of baan (mistletoe)".

The railway line between Boggabri and Narrabri South Junction (which included the future township of Baan Baa) was opened on 1 October 1882. The railway station at Baan Baa opened in 1883. The Baan Baa Post Office opened on 9 February 1885 and closed on 19 March 1988.

The Baan Baa Literary Institute building which is constructed of local cypress pine timber, was erected in 1923, and is now the local community hall. Baan Baa was once a bustling railway village, which once had its own bakery, butchery and service station. The village now serves primarily as a grain rail terminal. Baan Baa once had the longest railway platform in country New South Wales.

== Industry ==
It is a central delivery point for wheat and barley grown in the surrounding districts including Harparary, Maules Creek, and Turrawan. Beef cattle and prime lamb raising together with cotton growing are other important agricultural products of the district. Coal mining is becoming a major industry in the Baan Baa area, with gas exploration also expanding in the nearby Pilliga Scrub.

== Recreation ==
The town has a strong tradition of sport, fielding a strong combined team with Maules Creek in the Boggabri Cricket Competition and also tennis competitions.

A focal point of the community is the Railway Hotel, particularly during the harvest period in November and December each year. Church services are regularly conducted in the local church.

Preceding station	Former services	Following station
Turrawan towards Mungindi	Mungindi Line	Boggabri towards Werris Creek
