= Wee Waa =

- Town
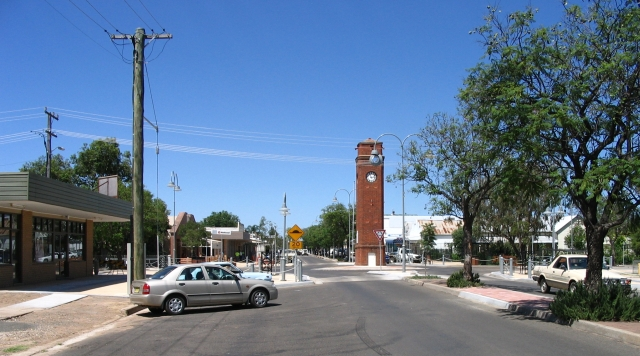
- Main street

- Coordinates: 30°12′S 149°26′E
- Country: Australia
- State: New South Wales
- LGA: Narrabri Shire
- Location: 559 km (347 mi) NW of Sydney; 40 km (25 mi) W of Narrabri; 142 km (88 mi) E of Walgett; 110 km (68 mi) SSW of Moree; 588 km (365 mi) SW of Brisbane

Government
  - State electorate: Barwon, Tamworth
  - Federal division: Parkes
- Elevation: 190 m (620 ft)

Population
  - Total: 1,571 (2021 census)
- Postcode: 2388
- County: White
Localities around Wee Waa
Merah North	Boolcarroll	Narrabri
Burren Junction	Wee Waa	Narrabri
Pilliga	Yarrie Lake	Bohena Creek

Wee Waa (/wiːwɔː/) is a town located on the north-western slopes of the New England region in New South Wales, Australia. The town is within the Narrabri Shire local government area and is on the Namoi River. Wee Waa is 41 kilometres (25 mi) north-west of Narrabri and 571 kilometres (355 mi) northwest of Sydney on the Kamilaroi Highway. At the 2021 census, Wee Waa had a population of 1,571.

Wee Waa is 42 kilometres from the Newell Highway, and is referred to as a gateway to the far west centres of Walgett, Collarenebri, Lightning Ridge opal fields and beyond.

The Aboriginal meaning of Wee Waa is "Fire for Roasting" from the language of the Kamilaroi people. The town is known to be the "Cotton Capital of Australia" as a rural community situated in the rich agricultural heartland of the Lower Namoi Valley in NSW. The town services a far greater rural community as well as the villages of Burren Junction, Pilliga and Gwabegar.

The town is situated approximately 190 metres (620 ft) above sea level.

== History ==
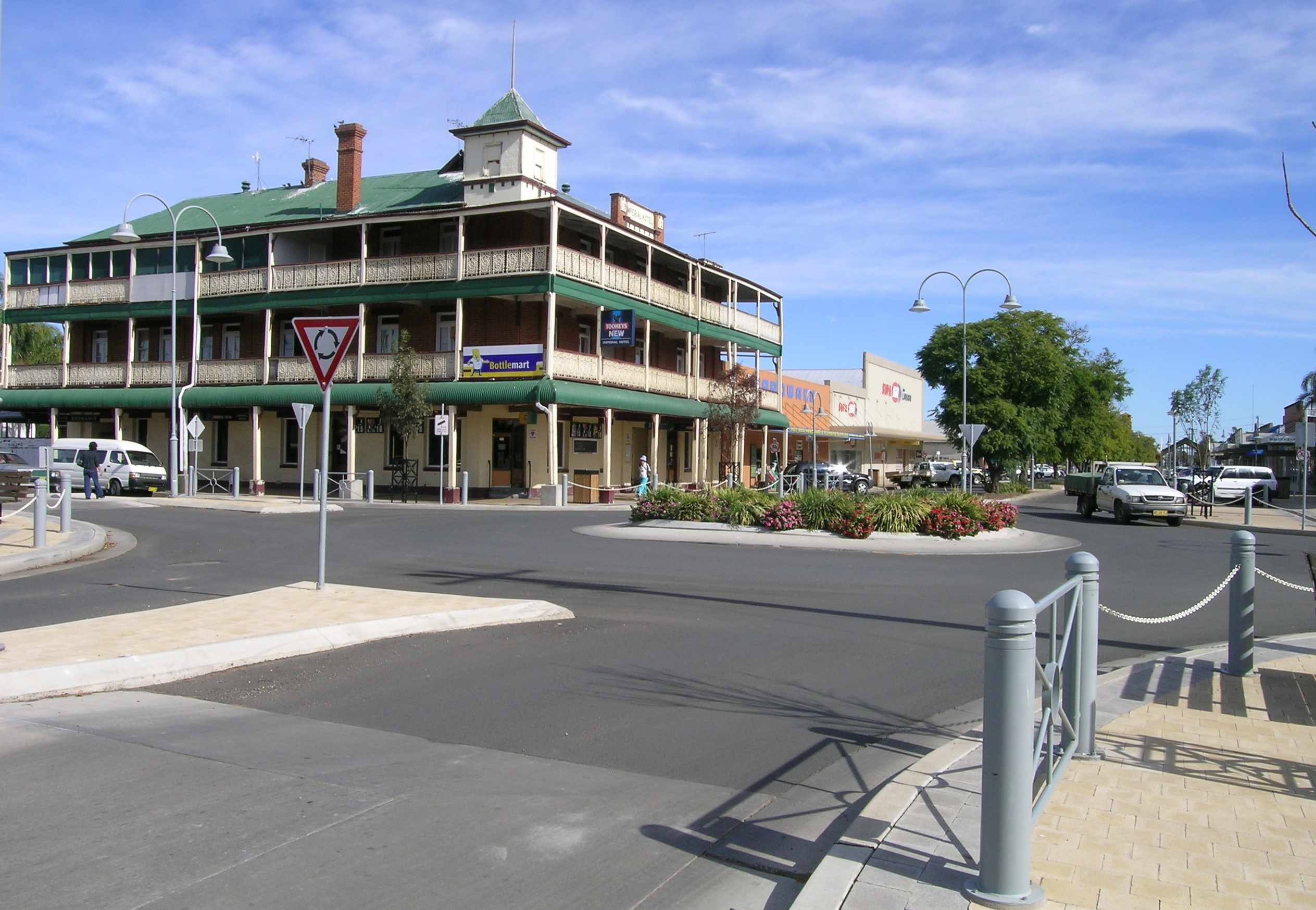
Kamilaroi Highway, Wee Waa

Before the arrival of European settlers, the Wee Waa area was inhabited by the Gamilaraay/Kamilaroi Aboriginal people.

The Wee Waa run was taken up by squatter George Hobler in 1837 and the settlement developed. It became an administrative centre in the late 1840s. A police station and court of petty sessions were established in 1847 and a post office opened two years later. It is the oldest established town in the area and is the birthplace of the commercial cotton industry in Australia.

Rail services were extended in 1901 from Narrabri to Walgett, passing through the town.

The first commercial cotton plantation was established in 1961, irrigated with water from the Keepit Dam on the Namoi River.

It was the first town built on the Namoi River. The town is subject to regular floods and is protected by a levee bank. However thousands of people were isolated on properties around Wee Waa in February 2012.

== Environment ==
=== Natural ===
The Wee Waa district has a mean summer minimum temperature of 20 °C (68 °F) and a maximum of 35 °C (95 °F). Mean winter temperatures range from 4 °C (39 °F) to 18 °C (64 °F). Mean annual rainfall is 575 millimetres (22.6 in), falling on 80 days of the year.

The town and surrounding area have often been flooded by the Namoi River, which can require supplies to be flown in by helicopter.

=== Manmade ===
The town has two motels, four schools, a preschool, Nurruby Wee Waa Early Education Service, two hotels and two caravan parks as well as eating-places, a public swimming pool, a nine-hole golf course, bowling club, tennis courts, a modern sporting complex, a hostel for the aged and a new medical centre.

Wee Waa is serviced by NSW TrainLink rail services, interstate coaches, and daily air services offered through Narrabri.

== Notable events ==
Historical population
Year	Pop.	±%
1954	1,075	—
1961	1,099	+2.2%
1966	1,488	+35.4%
1971	1,845	+24.0%
1976	1,904	+3.2%
1981	1,904	+0.0%
1986	2,106	+10.6%
1991	2,030	−3.6%
1996	1,860	−8.4%
2001	1,814	−2.5%
2006	1,689	−6.9%
2011	1,653	−2.1%
2016	1,632	−1.3%
2021	1,571	−3.7%
Source: Australian Bureau of Statistics data.

In 1973, Arthur Murray led the Aboriginal cotton-chippers on strike for better pay and working conditions. The Wee Waa Echo called them "radicals and professional troublemakers", adding that "it is not fanciful to see the Aboriginal problem as the powder keg for Communist aggression in Australia".

It was in Wee Waa police station that rugby player Eddie Murray died in 1981, one of the Aboriginal deaths in custody that prompted a Royal Commission to be set up. It was also the first town in Australia to use DNA testing to find a rapist.

On 17 May 2013 at the 79th Annual Wee Waa Show, Columbia Records held the global launch party for the French electronic music duo Daft Punk's album Random Access Memories. This caused much excitement in the town, and it attracted an estimated 2,500 tourists. It was initially believed that footage recorded from the event would be used for a music video; however, this did not come to fruition.

== Sport ==
The town has a multi-function Sports Complex, which also acts as a de facto community centre.

The most popular sport in Wee Waa is rugby league, the name of the town's club is the Wee Waa Panthers. The Panthers compete in the Group 4 Rugby League competition, which is based in the areas surrounding Tamworth. The club's most famous export is Jamie Lyon. A club junior, Lyon famously left his professional career with the Parramatta Eels to return for a season with the Wee Waa Panthers. The first-grade team went on to win that year (2004) against Moree, 55 to 12. Lyon returned to professional football with St Helens for two years to play in the European Super League. Following this, Lyon played for the Manly Warringah Sea Eagles playing from 2007 to 2016, winning a premiership in 2008 and 2011.

The local soccer club is the Wee Waa United Football Club. In 2019, the club won the Namoi Premier League beating Narrabri FC 2–1 in extra time. The game was broadcast across the state on BarTV.

Wee Waa produced Andrew Currey, the former Australian Olympic javelin athlete and the nation's leading javelin specialist in the 1990s. Currey competed at two Olympic games; Atlanta 1996 & Sydney 2000. Additionally, Currey competed in three Commonwealth Games: 1994 Victoria, 1998 Kuala Lumpur, and 2002 Manchester.

== Notable residents ==
- Vincent Ball, actor (born 4 December 1923)
- Andrew Currey, nine-time national champion in the men's javelin throw
- Braydon Trindall, professional rugby league footballer
