= County of Clive, Queensland =

Clive Queensland
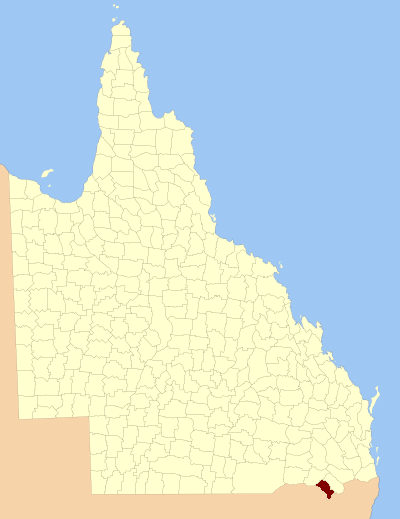
- Location within Queensland
Lands administrative divisions around Clive:
Marsh	Marsh	Bentinck
Arrawatta (NSW)	Clive	Bentinck
Arrawatta (NSW)	Gough (NSW)	Clive (NSW)

The County of Clive is a county (a cadastral division) in the southern Darling Downs region of Queensland, Australia, on the state border with New South Wales. It was named and bounded by the Governor in Council on 7 March 1901 under the Land Act 1897.

== Parishes ==
Clive is divided into parishes, as listed below:

Parish	LGA	Coordinates	Towns
Aitkins Flat	Goondiwindi	29°04′S 151°29′E	
Arcot	Goondiwindi	28°46′S 151°24′E	
Beebo	Goondiwindi	28°41′S 150°59′E	Beebo
Bonshaw	Goondiwindi	29°05′S 151°20′E	
Bracker	Goondiwindi	28°33′S 151°08′E	
Claremont	Southern Downs	28°58′S 151°25′E	
Glenlyon	Southern Downs	28°50′S 151°31′E	Glenlyon
Greenup	Goondiwindi	28°33′S 151°15′E	
Gunyan	Goondiwindi	28°55′S 151°18′E	
Inglewood	Goondiwindi	28°27′S 151°02′E	Inglewood
Maidenhead	Goondiwindi	29°07′S 151°23′E	
Mingoola	Southern Downs	28°55′S 151°33′E	
Plassey	Goondiwindi	28°36′S 151°21′E	
Silver Spur	Goondiwindi	28°46′S 151°16′E	
Tandan	Goondiwindi	28°33′S 151°00′E	
Texas	Goondiwindi	28°44′S 151°06′E	Texas
Wyemo	Goondiwindi	28°38′S 150°52′E	

== External links ==
- "Map of the County of Clive". Queensland Government. 1921.
