= Pilliga, New South Wales =

Pilliga New South Wales
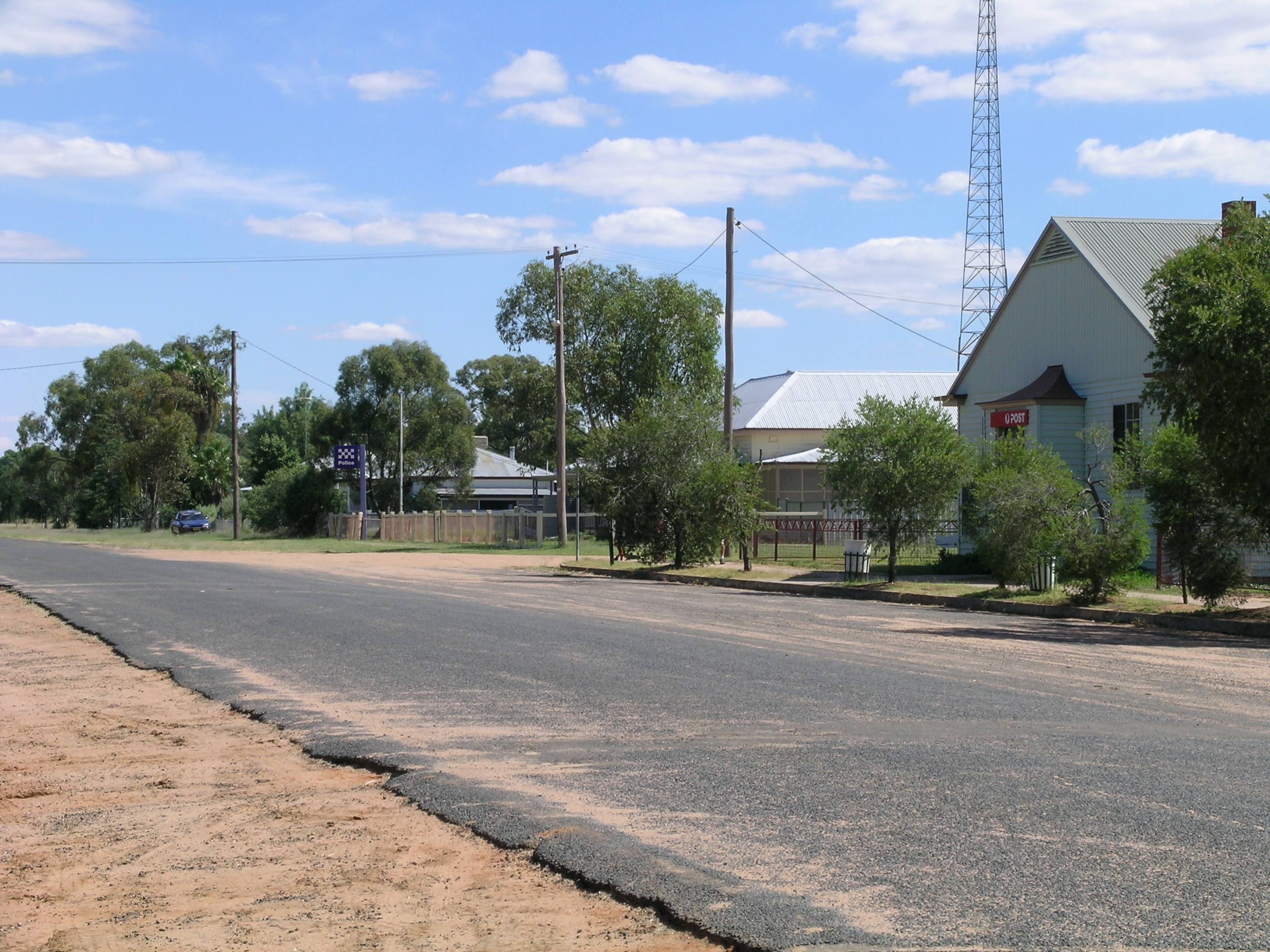
- The main street of Pilliga

- Coordinates: 30°21′S 148°54′E
- Population: 217 (2016 census)
- Postcode(s): 2388
- LGA(s): Narrabri Shire
- County: Australia
- State electorate(s): Barwon, Tamworth
- Federal division(s): Parkes

Pilliga is a village 105 km west of Narrabri in the North West Plains section of the New England region of New South Wales, Australia. The village is within Narrabri Shire local government area.

It is located near the Pilliga Forest, which supports a rich assortment of bird life and a significant timber harvesting industry. At the 2016 census, Pilliga had a population of 217 people. The place name is derived from an Aboriginal word for "swamp oaks". The Pilliga post office opened on 1 January 1867.

In 1902 the Pilliga artesian bore baths were constructed as a permanent town water supply. These baths have become a popular swimming and therapeutic spot for residents and visitors. The water temperature of the Pilliga bore is 37 °C (99 °F).

The village has a store, police station, post office and school which has about 16 enrolled pupils.

The book A Million Wild Acres by Eric Rolls, is an acclaimed environmental history of the Pilliga Scrub.

Another point of dubious interest relevant to the area, is the frequent, apparent sightings of the mythical Yowie.
