= 2MAX =

Coordinates: 30.324835°S 149.782833°E

2MAX FM
Narrabri, New South Wales; Australia
- Frequency: 91.3 MHz

Programming
- Format: General Formatting

History
- First air date: 1992

2MAX FM is a community radio station based in Narrabri, New South Wales, Australia. The station has been doing broadcasts for over 15 years in the regional area after being granted a full-time license in 2000.

2MAX FM can be heard in Narrabri, Wee Waa, Coonabaraban, Gunnedah, Moree and throughout the Narrabri Shire—broadcasting 10 KWatts from the top of Mount Dowe.

== Codes of Practice ==
The station is subject to the Community Broadcasting Codes of Practice, as updated in 2009. An investigation was made due to a reported failure to allow the Community Participation department in the station operations and decision making. No breaches were found.

== Programming ==
Country music is the most played on the station, with a variety of genres including Folk, Rock & Pop, Classical, 50s, 60s, 70s 80 & 90s and Christian/Religious. They follow what the community wants to hear as indicated by their surveys. They also provide a platform for Australian music artists to showcase their songs.

The majority of presenters are over 55 and are volunteers.

A Programme committee governs the programmes that are put to air. Community radio is focussed on giving people a local voice, especially those who would not normally get access to the airtime.

This may include ethnic language programs, programs for the print handicapped, programming for gay and lesbian members, youth programs or niche music. In rural areas such as Narrabri, this is made much more difficult, as censorship and conservatism is the norm.

A recent addition to programming is the "Max FM Mornings" program. Between the hours of 9am-12noon presents information on the local community, including Bush Bargains, school news, Narrabri Shire Council Report by the Mayor, a local weeds report, and a What's On In Our Shire report.

== History ==
2MAX FM began life as an aspirant community radio station known as Narrabri Shire Community Radio (NSCR). A small group of locals wanted a local radio station, and had discovered that there were community licences available. A public meeting was held, and a steering committee was formed.

The first test broadcast was from the Old Shire Council building, running at approx. 5 watts from a small antenna hung out the office window! The test broadcaster lasted a week, but was largely ignored by the Narrabri community.

A series of test broadcasts continued during the 1990s. Another community aspirant group raised its head in the late 1990s forcing NSCR into frequency sharing on a turn about basis.

The lack of financial support from the local community was exacerbated by this. Many business houses took a wait and see approach.

The full-time licence was finally granted in 2000 - when then-President Terry Hogan received the phone call, he was amazed at the lack of celebration. It was simply business as usual in Narrabri. The launching of MAX FM, coupled with a far more aggressive sales team lead to some limited acceptance by the local community.

A focus on the oldest members of the community seemed to be the right niche for MAX FM, with income, membership and technical growth was substantial.

== Income ==
The station earns income from memberships, sponsorships, fundraising, and grants, which totals approximately $140,000 per year.

== Technical data ==
- Frequency - 91.3FM
- Licensed Power - 10 Kw.
- Effective Radiated Power - 10Kwatts
- Studio automation uses "Raduga"
