= Narrabri Gaol and Residence =

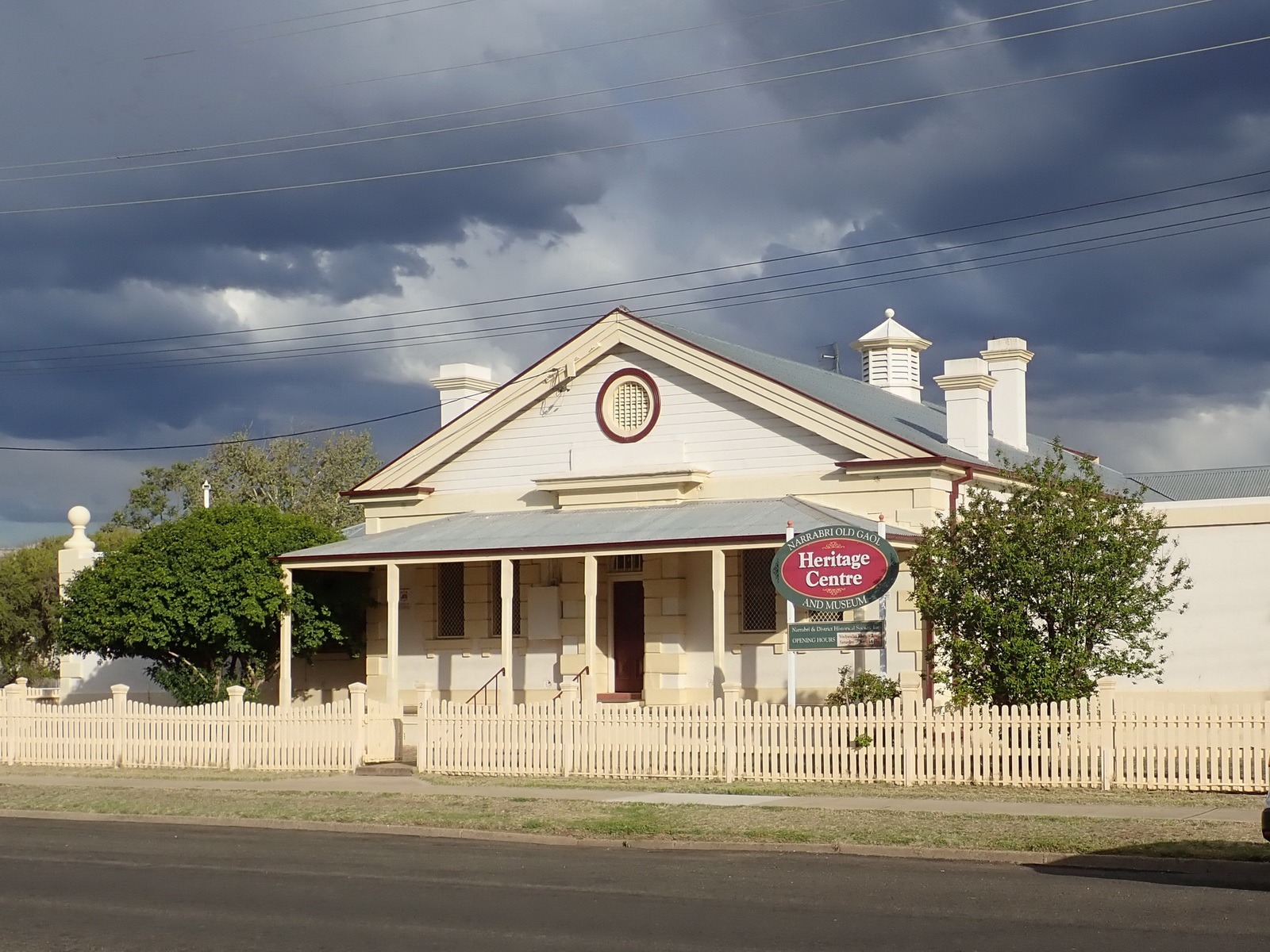
- Former Narrabri Gaol, 2018

- Location within New South Wales Location within Australia
- 30°19′43″S 149°47′10″E
- Location: Bowen Street, Narrabri, Narrabri Shire, New South Wales, Australia

History
- Built: 1880–1881

Site notes
- Architect: James Barnet
- Owner: Narrabri Shire Council

New South Wales Heritage Register
- Official name: Narrabri Gaol and Residence
- Type: State heritage (built)
- Designated: 2 April 1999
- Reference no.: 344
- Type: Gaol/Lock-up
- Category: Law Enforcement
- Builders: J. Conlon

The Narrabri Gaol and Residence is a heritage-listed former gaol and now museum at Bowen Street, Narrabri, Narrabri Shire, New South Wales, Australia. The building was designed by James Barnet and built from 1880 to 1881 by J. Conlon. The property is owned by Narrabri Shire Council and was added to the New South Wales State Heritage Register on 2 April 1999.

== History ==
The first government structures to be erected on the site were the first court house, lock-up and lock-up keepers accommodation. In 1865 the lock-up consisted of two cells, accommodating a maximum of six prisoners. In 1875 this was extended by infilling the passage between the two cells, creating an extra cell for two additional prisoners. These structures were located in the area that now forms the forecourt to the second courthouse.

As a result of a number of escapes and influx of prisoners in late 1877, application for additional accommodation was made by the Acting Gaoler.

Tenders were called in 1880 for the erection of a gaol and residence at Narrabri. The buildings were designed by Colonial Architect James Barnet and the plans were available for inspection at the Colonial Architects Office and at Narrabri Court House.

Tenders closed on 31 September 1880 and the tender of J. Conlon was accepted on 20 October 1880 for A£3,590, eight shillings and sixpence. The buildings were constructed from 1880 to 1881.

On the 10 October 1886 the site was notified in the Government Gazette as reserved for a gaolsite, along with reserves for the Court House and Police purposes.

== Description ==
A formal composition consisting of a main central wing having an elaborate classical pediment and roof fleche flanked on the street by tall brick walls having rendered quoins and spheres above. A timber verandah frames the main entrance while at the rear there is an extensive range of single storey residential cell and service blocks all of similar stuccoed brick construction.

The walls of the building are all solid, generally laid in English bond and are substantial. In the residential section, external walls are 350 millimetres (14 in) thick and internal walls are 225 millimetres (8.9 in) thick. In the gaol section the external walls are 450 millimetres (18 in) thick and internal walls are 350 millimetres (14 in) thick. The floors are generally raised approx 750 millimetres (30 in) above the footpath level.

The roof structure is timber with pine boarding on the rafters, oversheeted with corrugated galvanised iron. The structure is double couple close structure with collar ties and substantial ceiling joists. All timbers are cypress pine.

=== Condition ===
The physical condition is good. The archaeological potential is low.

=== Modifications and dates ===
Since its construction in 1880–1881 the following modifications have been made:

- 1882–1883 – water tank added
- 1890 – addition (probably kitchen and wash house)
- 1898 – addition (probably 2 bedrooms, bathroom and verandah)
- 1946 – demolition of kitchen, wash house, bedrooms, bathrooms, external closet rear porch and steps and infilling the well. Dining room extension and providing a double door link to the existing dining room.
- 1988 – verandah on Bowen Street entrance completely reconstructed with floorboards replaced again in 2010.
- 1995 – perimeter wall to rear courtyard underpinned – extent is unknown.
- 1997 – perimeter wall to eastern courtyard underpinned and partially reconstructed.

== Heritage listing ==
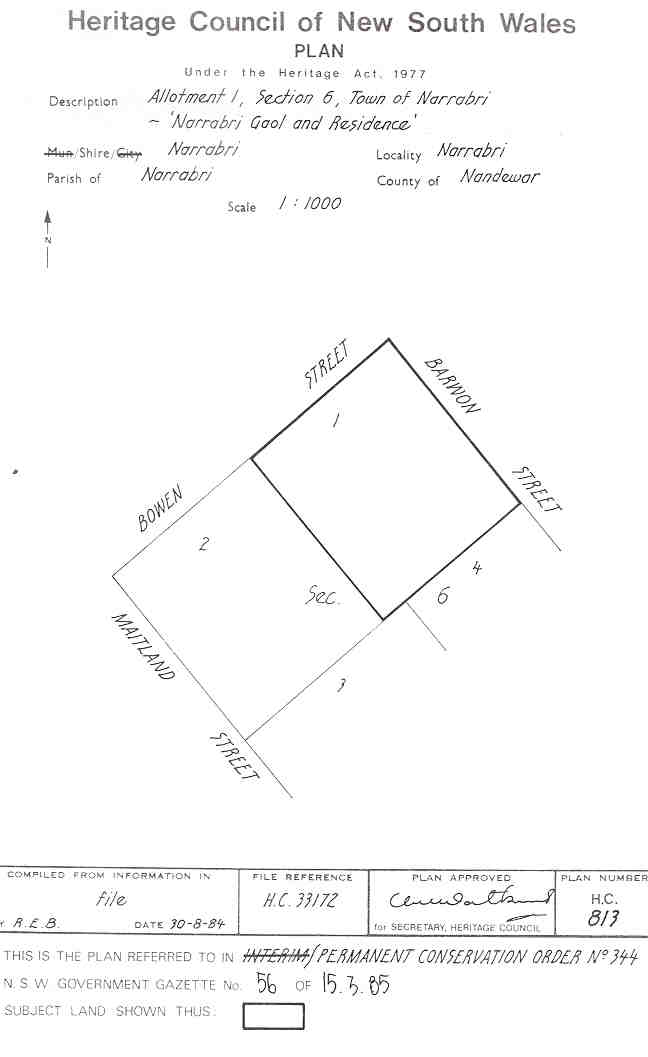
Heritage boundaries

As at 1 October 1997, designed by Colonial Architect James Barnett, the gaol has functioned continuously as such for 101 years and, apart from the last 10 years, has operated in the way intended in the original design, representing a system of the administration of punishment that is no longer considered appropriate. The form of the buildings for a country gaol appears to be unique with its formal symmetrical facade and enclosing wall. It is an important part of the streetscape and a dominant element particularly in Bowen Street. Due to its function as a police gaol and its ancillary functions it has become an integral part of life of Narrabri and has strong associations with the local community.

The Narrabri Gaol and Residence was listed on the New South Wales State Heritage Register on 2 April 1999 having satisfied the following criteria.

The place is important in demonstrating the course, or pattern, of cultural or natural history in New South Wales.

Designed by an important Colonial Architect James Barnett, it has functioned continuously as a gaol for 101 years and apart from the last 10 years has operated in the way intended in the original design, representing a system of the administration of punishment that is no longer considered appropriate.

The place is important in demonstrating aesthetic characteristics and/or a high degree of creative or technical achievement in New South Wales.

The form of the buildings for a country gaol appears to be unique with its formal symmetrical facade and enclosing wall. It is an important part of the streescape and a dominant element particularly in Bowen Street.

The place has a strong or special association with a particular community or cultural group in New South Wales for social, cultural or spiritual reasons.

It forms a significant part of the only important group of civil buildings in Narrabri. Due to its function as a police gaol and its ancillary functions it has an integral part of life of Narrabri and has strong associations with the local community.

The place possesses uncommon, rare or endangered aspects of the cultural or natural history of New South Wales.

It is one of only several country goals constructed between 1865 and 1890 during Barnett's time and is one of the last to be closed.

== See also ==
- Punishment in Australia
