= Burnett County, New South Wales =

Burnett New South Wales
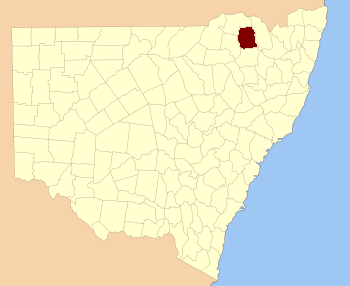
- Location in New South Wales
Lands administrative divisions around Burnett:
| Stapylton | Stapylton | Arrawatta |
| Courallie | Burnett | Arrawatta |
| Courallie | Murchison | Arrawatta |

Burnett County, New South Wales is one of the 141 cadastral divisions of New South Wales.

Burnett County was named in honour of James Charles Burnett, surveyor (1815–1854).

== Parishes ==
A full list of parishes found within this county; their current LGA and mapping coordinates to the approximate centre of each location is as follows:

| Parish | LGA | Coordinates |
|---|---|---|
| Abercrombie | Gwydir Shire | 29°12′54″S 150°30′04″E |
| Adams | Gwydir Shire | 29°39′54″S 150°36′04″E |
| Balfour | Gwydir Shire | 29°37′54″S 150°40′04″E |
| Baroma | Gwydir Shire | 29°09′54″S 150°17′04″E |
| Bledger | Gwydir Shire | 29°27′54″S 150°23′04″E |
| Blue Nobby | Inverell Shire | 29°58′54″S 150°41′04″E |
| Bogamildi | Gwydir Shire | 29°22′54″S 150°13′04″E |
| Boobah | Gwydir Shire | 29°31′54″S 150°37′04″E |
| Boyanga | Gwydir Shire | 29°14′54″S 150°20′04″E |
| Bullala | Gwydir Shire | 29°23′54″S 150°20′04″E |
| Burnett | Inverell Shire | 29°33′54″S 150°53′04″E |
| Clare | Gwydir Shire | 29°37′54″S 150°31′04″E |
| Codrington | Gwydir Shire | 29°16′54″S 150°42′04″E |
| Coolatai | Inverell Shire | 29°11′54″S 150°48′04″E |
| Cox | Gwydir Shire | 29°11′54″S 150°25′04″E |
| Eales | Gwydir Shire | 29°29′54″S 150°19′04″E |
| Ellis | Gwydir Shire | 29°01′54″S 150°35′04″E |
| Gill | Gwydir Shire | 29°08′54″S 150°27′04″E |
| Gineroi | Gwydir Shire | 29°40′54″S 150°31′04″E |
| Glenalvon | Gwydir Shire | 29°21′54″S 150°30′04″E |
| Goalonga | Gwydir Shire | 29°26′54″S 150°30′04″E |
| Goorabil | Gwydir Shire | 29°17′54″S 150°14′04″E |
| Gournama | Gwydir Shire | 29°20′54″S 150°39′04″E |
| Gragin | Inverell Shire | 29°31′54″S 150°48′04″E |
| Gravesend | Gwydir Shire | 29°32′54″S 150°17′04″E |
| Gugumburra | Gwydir Shire | 29°24′54″S 150°38′04″E |
| Gullungutta | Gwydir Shire | 29°29′54″S 150°48′04″E |
| Gunnee | Inverell Shire | 29°35′54″S 150°47′04″E |
| Hadleigh | Gwydir Shire | 29°33′54″S 150°35′04″E |
| Hollingsworth | Gwydir Shire | 29°20′54″S 150°45′04″E |
| Kiga | Gwydir Shire | 29°05′54″S 150°16′04″E |
| Mandoe | Gwydir Shire | 29°10′54″S 150°42′04″E |
| Mitchell | Gwydir Shire | 29°02′54″S 150°22′04″E |
| Monsoon | Gwydir Shire | 29°37′54″S 150°16′04″E |
| Murgo | Gwydir Shire | 29°06′54″S 150°21′04″E |
| Muscle | Gwydir Shire | 29°00′54″S 150°28′04″E |
| Myalla | Gwydir Shire | 29°32′54″S 150°45′04″E |
| Nunga Nunga | Gwydir Shire | 29°26′54″S 150°15′04″E |
| Oregon | Gwydir Shire | 29°28′54″S 150°27′04″E |
| Ottley | Gwydir Shire | 29°20′54″S 150°50′04″E |
| Parkhurst | Inverell Shire | 29°07′54″S 150°47′04″E |
| Pepperbox | Gwydir Shire | 29°11′54″S 150°37′04″E |
| Rocky Hole | Gwydir Shire | 29°17′54″S 150°24′04″E |
| Russell | Inverell Shire | 29°20′54″S 150°55′04″E |
| Singapoora | Gwydir Shire | 29°41′54″S 150°24′04″E |
| Stack | Gwydir Shire | 29°12′54″S 150°16′04″E |
| Stanley | Gwydir Shire | 29°23′54″S 150°30′04″E |
| Stephenson | Gwydir Shire | 29°09′54″S 150°33′04″E |
| Strathmore | Gwydir Shire | 29°22′54″S 150°25′04″E |
| Stuart | Gwydir Shire | 29°18′54″S 150°30′04″E |
| Tackinbri | Gwydir Shire | 29°01′54″S 150°17′04″E |
| Tullin Tulla | Gwydir Shire | 29°04′54″S 150°21′04″E |
| Vicars | Gwydir Shire | 29°29′54″S 150°30′04″E |
| Warialda | Gwydir Shire | 29°32′54″S 150°34′04″E |
| Yagobe | Gwydir Shire | 29°29′54″S 150°14′04″E |
| Yallaroi | Gwydir Shire | 29°04′54″S 150°32′04″E |
| Yallaroi | Gwydir Shire | 29°04′54″S 150°29′04″E |
