= Alloway (cottage) =

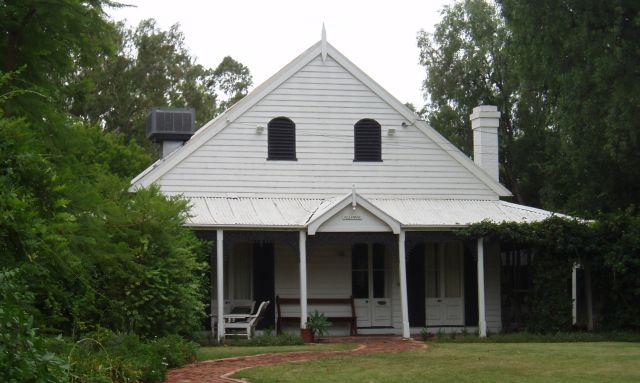

- Location within New South Wales Location within Australia
- 29°27′36″S 149°50′37″E
- Location: 15 Gwydir Street, Moree, Moree Plains Shire, New South Wales, Australia

History
- Built: 1875

New South Wales Heritage Register
- Official name: Alloway
- Type: State heritage (built)
- Designated: 2 April 1999
- Reference no.: 394
- Type: Cottage
- Category: Residential buildings (private)

Alloway is a heritage-listed cottage located at 15 Gwydir Street, Moree, in the North West Slopes region of New South Wales, Australia. It was built during 1875. The cottage was added to the New South Wales State Heritage Register on 2 April 1999.

== Description ==
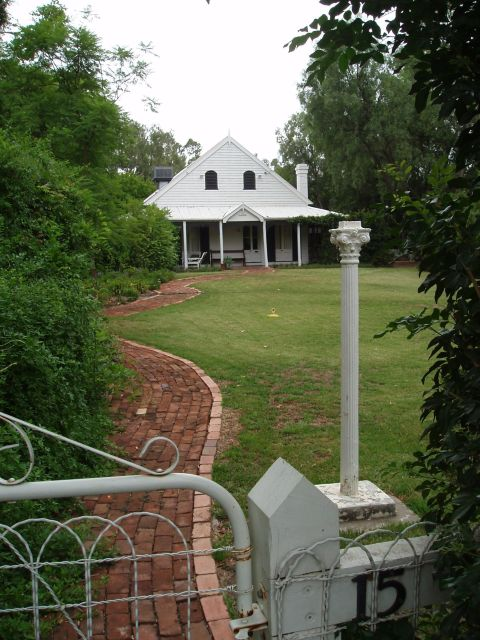
View from the street

The house appears to date from the 1870s. The doorbell is dated 1876 while the cast iron lace work is dated 1880. It is sited on land granted to James Traynor in 1860. Alexander McIntosh bought the house in 1882 and the late F. J. Crowe purchased it from the MacIntosh Estate in 1951. The house is built of large weatherboards and has a steeply pitched gabled roof. A smaller gable breaks the line of the front verandah roof. The verandah is decorated with cast iron lace valances and brackets and has wooden posts and a brick floor. The eastern side has been enclosed with gauze. French doors with wooden shutters, brass door knobs and curved glass open onto the front verandah. A kitchen wing adjoins the main house and adjoining this is a flat which was originally the harness room. Interior has weatherboard walls and ceilings, cedar door and architraves. The pleasant garden is well-maintained and has numerous mature trees. The front fence is probably original and is of intertwined wire and timber posts. Curtilage to include area to property boundary.

== Heritage listing ==
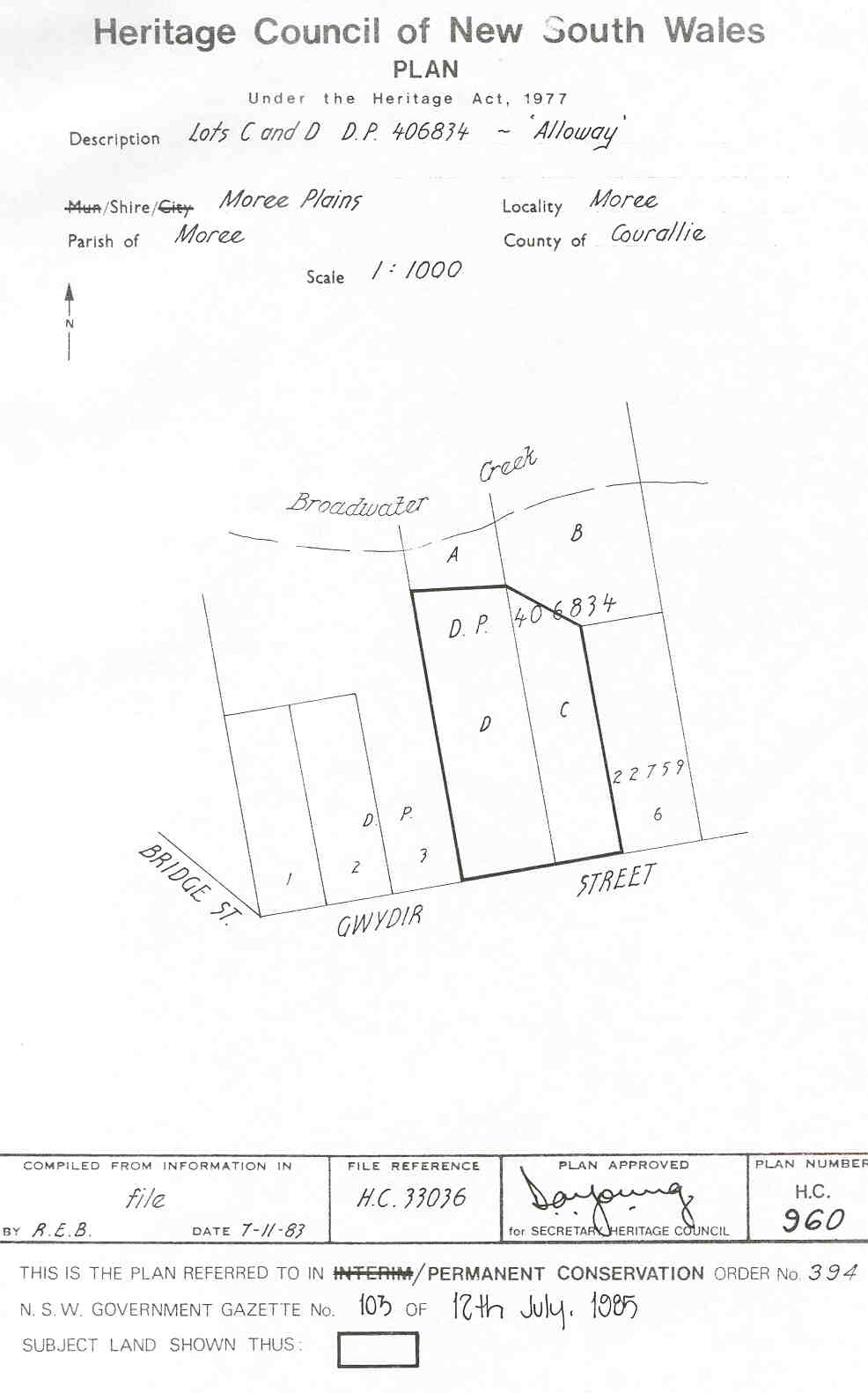
Heritage boundaries

As at 21 December 2001, an attractive, well-preserved cottage-style house which is one of the oldest in Moree and is a rare example of this type of architecture in the area. It is enhanced by its setting in pleasant gardens with many mature trees.

Alloway was listed on the New South Wales State Heritage Register on 2 April 1999.

== See also ==
- Australian residential architectural styles
