= Narrabri Post Office =

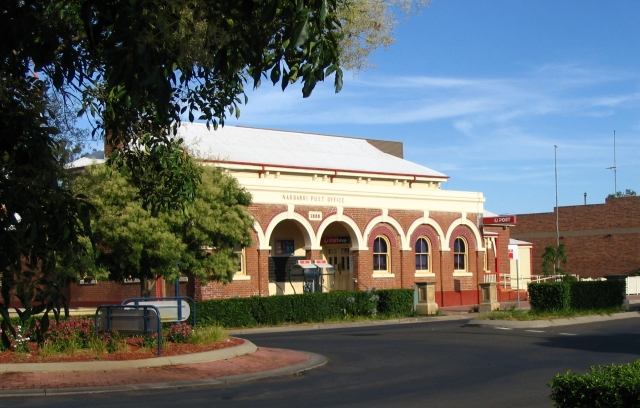

- Location within New South Wales
- 30.3250°S 149.7833°E
- Location: 138–140 Maitland Street, Narrabri, New South Wales, Australia

History
- Built: 1888

Site notes
- Architect: New South Wales Colonial Architect's Office under James Barnet

Commonwealth Heritage List
- Official name: Narrabri Post Office and former Telegraph Office
- Type: Listed place (Historic)
- Designated: 08 November 2011
- Reference no.: 105495
- Builders: FA King

Narrabri Post Office is a heritage-listed post office at 138–140 Maitland Street, Narrabri, New South Wales, Australia. It is also known as Narrabri Post Office and former Telegraph Office. It was designed by the NSW Colonial Architect's Office under James Barnet and built by FA King in 1888. It was added to the Australian Commonwealth Heritage List on 8 November 2011.

== History ==
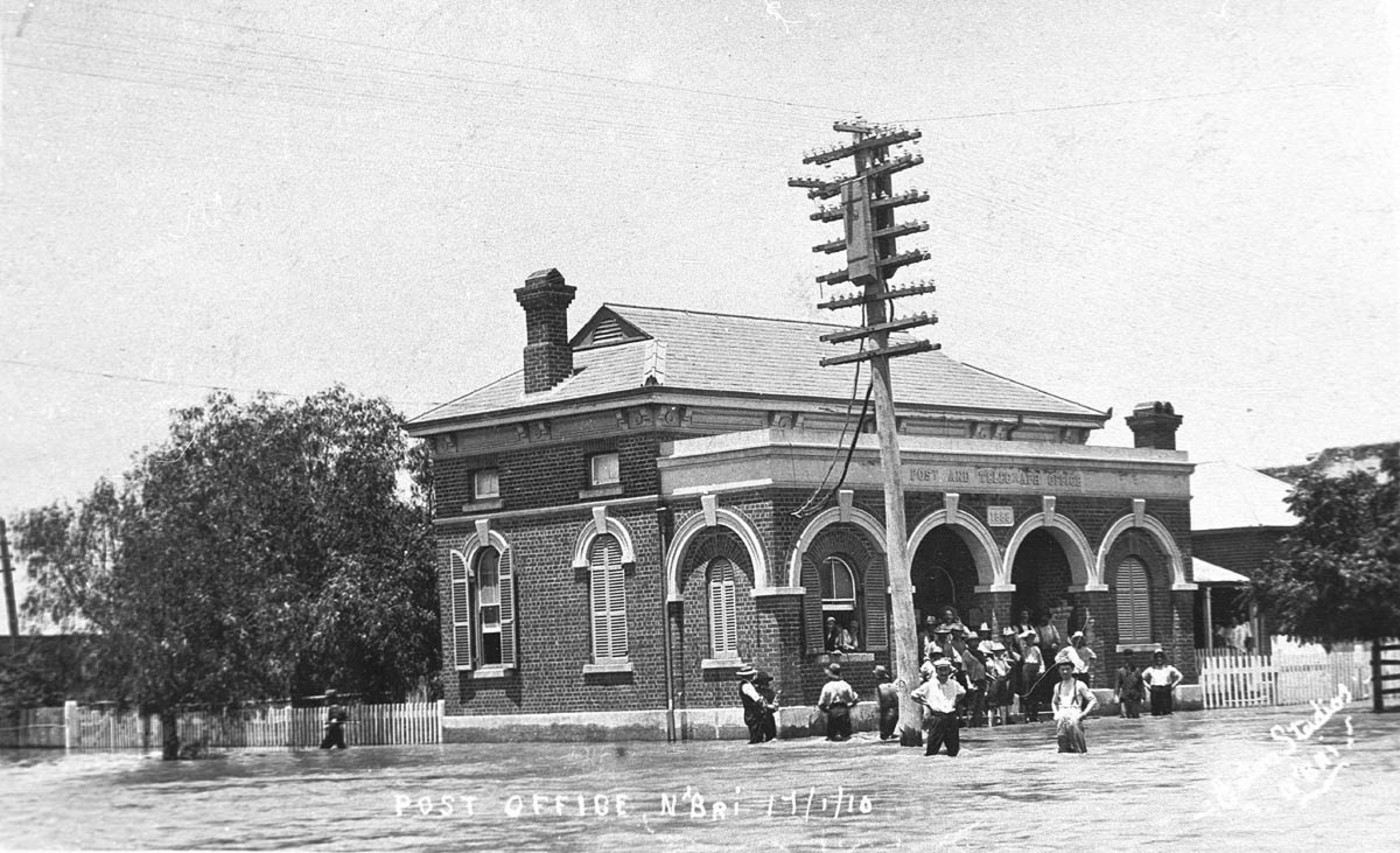
Floodwaters surrounding the Post Office, 17 January 1910

The first pastoral activities in the area occurred in the 1830s, with a town forming in the late 1840s. A hotel was licensed in 1858 and the town was proclaimed in 1860. The first post office and police station were established but a major flood devastated the township in 1864. A court house was also constructed in the 1860s, but after the Robertson Land Act of 1861 the area was slowly opened up to smaller selectors and wheat-growing began in 1873. The railway arrived in the district in 1882 and generated further settlement.

The Narrabri Post Office was constructed, with quarters, by FA King in 1888 to a design by the New South Wales Colonial Architect's office, under James Barnet.

The post office was flooded in January 1910.

In c. 1914 the original four-arched design was extended to six arches.

== Description ==
Narrabri Post Office is at 138–140 Maitland Street, corner Doyle Street, Narrabri, comprising the whole of Lot 21 DP775501.

The Narrabri Post Office is a single storey brick building with a timber floor and corrugated iron roof.

The original building is on a corner site at the intersection of Maitland and Doyle Streets, in the main shopping precinct. James Barnet was architect for the four-arched 1888 design. It incorporates an L-shaped quarters juxtaposed behind the arcaded front to Maitland Street, and two parallel wings running back across the site to the rear and the later Telephone Exchange.

The arcaded front originally comprised four arches, with the c.1914 addition adding two more. The arcaded front was originally a verandah but now, in its filled-in form, comprises the main public hall, the entry porch and an enclosed return loggia housing the PO boxes. The block immediately behind housed the post office and part of the quarters originally, to judge from their expression in the roof plan. This now houses the back office, clerical area and loading bay.

It has a timber-framed roof constructed in hipped gables, clad in corrugated galvanised iron, supported on a cornice with intermittent bracketing in pairs, and punctuated by a chimney at the Doyle Street end. There are three other chimneys remaining above the lunch room, postmaster's office and rear toilets area. The chimneys are corniced and in exposed face brick, and the roofs' gabled hips have small lunette ventilators.

The arcade front formed a panel in face brick and stucco to Maitland Street. The loggia was topped by a stucco-rendered entablature bearing the name Narrabri Post Office, in the manner of Barnet's other larger post offices of the time, the arch keystones rise up to support the entablature immediately overhead. The arches themselves are dressed in robust stucco archivolts and spring from a set of astylar brick piers. A date plaque in stucco with scalloped corners and the inscription 1888 sits between the second and third arches. The four inset sash windows form arched openings within each arch, one of Greenway's signatures and carried through in a similar way, with a tuck pointed and differently coloured arch over the window inside each arch screen. The north side, facing Doyle Street, is plainly surfaced in face brick with rectangular windows, plain-paned in the lower sash and multi-paned in the upper, each with a dressed sill in stone and overpainted.

The quarters' elevation to Maitland Street is linked to the post office loggia by a timber framed porch which leads into the current retail area via a single leaf door, and into the former postmaster's office by another. In its present form this was probably added later, around 1900. The quarters are expressed with a hipped roof component held clear of the main post office mass, with a corniced chimney in exposed face brick at each end of its ridge. The west front of these quarters presented one segmentally arched double-hung sash window to Maitland Street, above a short and hefty sill on two brackets. A timber-framed verandah, hipped and with square-sectioned, quasi-Tuscan posts on pedestal-bases, faces south onto a side yard.

For these purposes the 1888 and c.1914 components are regarded as the original building. Parts of the quarters' verandah were later walled in with glazing and weatherboard aprons, which now seems to have been removed. A diagonal-latticed screen was added to the verandah at its west end and screened occupants from Maitland Street. This screen runs partway across the first south-facing bay of the verandah and creates an irregular post rhythm. A pitched and gable-roofed wing runs back along Doyle Street, probably also an addition, and a central wing with a self-contained hipped roof projects from the rear centre of the post office building, again running eastward. This is connected to the main post office roofing with a flat roof porch area described in Dawson's roof plan as "modern infill". A group of public telephones were placed along Doyle Street, but these are no longer in evidence. At the back of the block on the Doyle Street boundary, there is a generator room in front of the microwave tower. At the rear of the post office lunch room there is a bicycle shed. These were all evidently added much later. Where the microwave tower now stands, in the former back yard, were two more outbuildings, a power and battery room building and a second building, probably for storage. These have since been demolished.

A larger telephone exchange building was added, probably in the late 1960s. This presumably replaced earlier telephone exchange facilities. Architecturally this does not relate to the earlier Post Office buildings, being crowned with a massively proportioned box-framed metal roof and fascia, with aluminium-framed windows and finished in smooth faced cream bricks. The exchange is basically a simple cube in form, indented on the north side with a path and entry steps space and a water tank area. This is now separated from the Post Office by a chain-link fence and in part by a rolled top mesh fence around the Post Office's rear wing.

The post office was generally refurbished, probably in the 1980s and again in 2002, as part of its conversion to Australia Post retail outlet format. The 2002 plan shows a simple oblong retail area with a counter running the entire length of one side, and a mail room, postmen's area and clerical area in an open-plan back office. The present bicycle storage area has been moved into part of the rear central wing, and lunch and contractors' rooms had been fitted up there as well. The former main wing of the quarters has been converted into toilets, a locker room, a store room and a postmaster's office, generally used as another store room. The ramp has been discreetly slipped into the screened area at the west end of the verandah, and leads through a single leaf door to the merchandising area. The original ceilings and cornices are retained in the public areas. Over the former loggia area the ceiling is a flat board-lined ceiling. The ceiling then rises much higher over the main public space and beyond, with fibre or plasterboard linings, the original ceiling rose ventilators. The cornices are curved metal, probably corrugated galvanised and painted iron.

=== Condition ===
Faithful upgrading of the interior. Exterior and surrounds which include a picket fence have commenced.

The building is generally in sound condition.

Externally and internally the buildings ability to demonstrate key aspects of the original (and later extended) James Barnet design is good, with generally minor alterations at the front including signage and ramped access. The front and side elevations are generally as designed.

Internally the plan form of the building retains most aspects of the original design. Alterations relating to the merchandising area has utilised low framed walls that could be removed and which can be clearly seen as alterations. These generally do not detract from the original retained internal finishes, especially the ceiling.

=== Timeline ===
1888 (additions), 1895 (repairs), 1914 (additions)

== Heritage listing ==
The significant components of Narrabri Post Office include main postal building and quarters wing comprising fabric dating from 1888 through c.1914 (the latter includes additions). Narrabri Post Office was listed on the Australian Commonwealth Heritage List on 8 November 2011 having satisfied the following criteria.

Criterion A: Processes

Narrabri Post office, constructed in 1888, is an important building within the main street of Narrabri. The original smaller post office with a four arch loggia was designed by James Barnet; the loggia was later sympathetically extended to six arches. The post office is indicative of Narrabri's status as an important township during the late nineteenth century, for which it provided postal communications and services at the centre of an expanding region.

The significant components of Narrabri Post Office include main postal building and quarters wing comprising fabric dating from 1888 through c.1914 (the latter includes additions).

Criterion D: Characteristic values

Narrabri Post Office is an example of:

- Post office and telegraph office with quarters (second generation typology 1870–1929)
- Victorian arcade-fronted post offices
- the work of Colonial Architect, James Barnet.

Typologically, the Narrabri Post Office is an example of a second generation building with post and telegraph and quarters. The building was originally designed as a smaller post office with a four arch loggia to the street elevation, but in 1888 the street frontage was extended to a six arch loggia. These alterations were designed by James Barnet in the same style as the original building. Internally, the original plan form of the post office has been altered, but it is unusual in its location of the quarters on the ground level and not an upper level.

Stylistically and architecturally, Narrabri Post Office embodies Barnet at a turning point in his design of regional buildings, and early in the development of types and details that kept returning in later years. It is an important example of Barnet's single-storey arcade-fronted post offices, which later became a recurrent genre in his designs, and also introduced Barnet's use of concentric arches in post office design. Other post offices in this arcaded face-brick genre all had their quarters directly overhead, which arguably gave them more presence. Narrabri, however, is no less interesting, being an early move on Barnet's part to express a quarters in direct juxtaposition with a public component on the same floor level. Further, the early additions to the street frontage of the building were designed by Barnet in the same style as the original building, effectively stretching (and emphasising) the original design.
