= Curlewis, New South Wales =

Curlewis
- Suburb
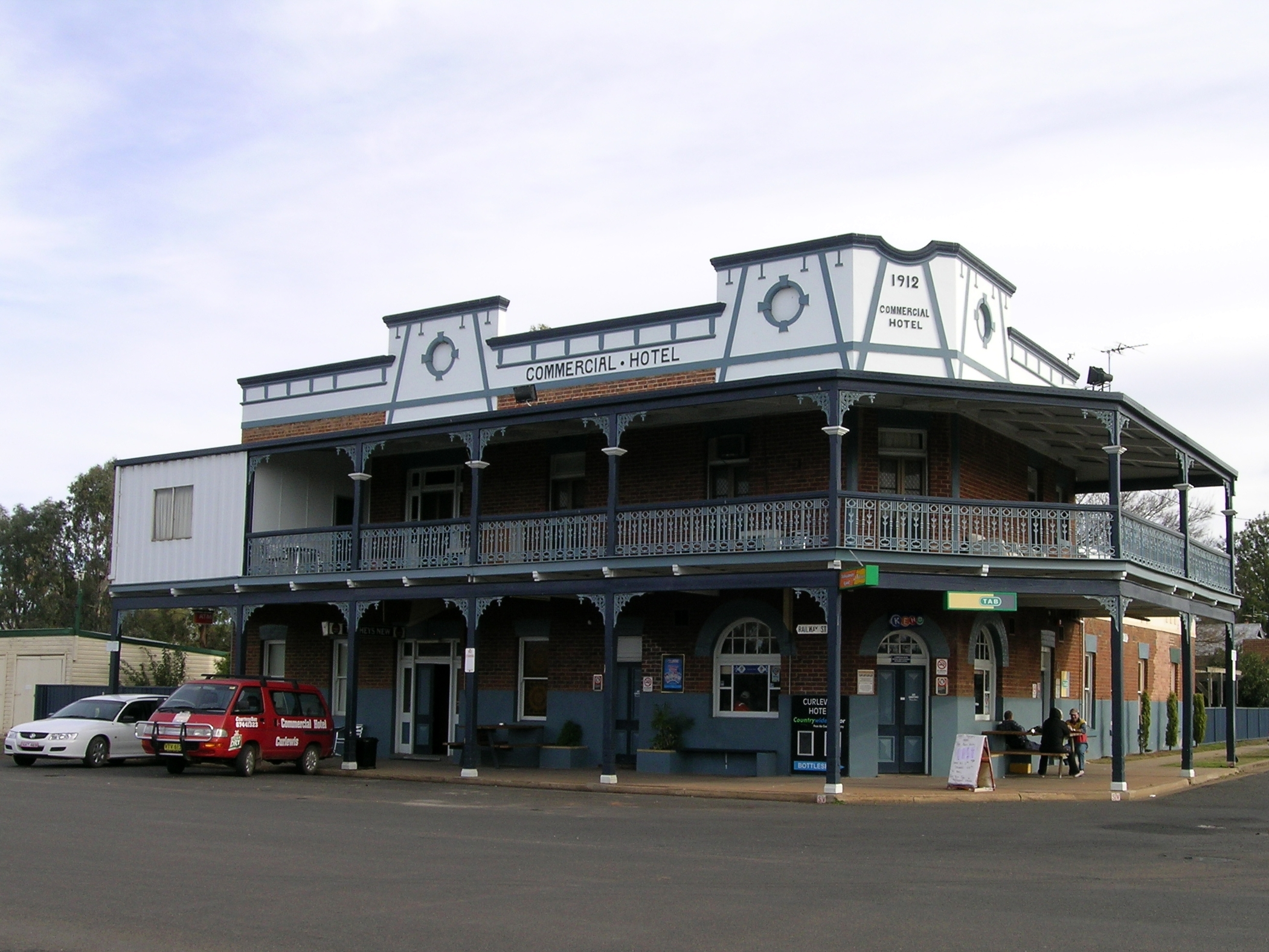
- Commercial Hotel

- Coordinates: 31°07′S 150°16′E
- Country: Australia
- State: New South Wales
- LGA: Gunnedah Shire
- Location: 16 km (9.9 mi) from Gunnedah; 88 km (55 mi) from Tamworth; 395 km (245 mi) from Sydney
- Established: 1890

Government
  - State electorate: Tamworth
  - Federal division: Parkes
- Elevation: 247 m (810 ft)

Population
  - Total: 779 (2021 census)
- Postcode: 2381
- County: Pottinger

Curlewis is a parish and a rural village on the Kamilaroi Highway, 16 kilometres south of Gunnedah, New South Wales in Australia. The village boundaries are in the Gunnedah Shire local government area of the North West Slopes portion of the New England region.

== History ==
Curlewis was founded by Henry Thomas Pike, a sawmiller from Norfolk who became the mayor of Gunnedah.

In 1909, the railway station opened as a stop on the Mungindi branch line, but has since closed. The station building was demolished in May 2013 after the roof was damaged by a storm earlier that year. Livestock sales commenced in 1919 in Curlewis and were, for many years, held in alternate weeks at Gunnedah and Curlewis until improvements to the Gunnedah saleyards, eclipsed Curlewis's yardings and led to the yard’s closure.

The lack of a nearby river has contributed to Curlewis having persistent water problems and water shortage. In 1950, the council had to de-silt an old earthen dam and erect a tank from which Curlewis residents could draw water. Reticulated water was connected to Curlewis in 1972.

== Population ==
At the 2021 Census, Curlewis had a resident population of 779, 52.8% male and 47.2% female. 26% of the population had Aboriginal and/or Torres Strait Islander background, compared with 3.2% in Australia. The most common form of employment for residents was coal mining (10.5%).

Curlewis now has a hotel, a public school (with 89 pupils enrolled), a general store, grain silo, police station, sports ground, a hall, Rural Fire Service, sport and recreation centre, recreational vehicle park and a bus station.

The Curlewis area is home to a large koala population and they may be seen on local farms, in the woodlands and village.
