= National Security Capability Review =

2017–2018 UK Government strategic evaluation

The National Security Capability Review or NSCR was a strategic evaluation conducted by the UK Government in 2017–2018 to assess and strengthen the country's national security, defence, and foreign policy capabilities. It aimed to ensure the UK could effectively respond to evolving global threats and maintain its security in an increasingly unstable world. The review addressed emerging challenges such as cyber threats, terrorism, and geopolitical instability while emphasising a comprehensive, cross-government approach to national security.

== Formation ==
The NSCR was initiated in July 2017 under Prime Minister Theresa May’s government as a response to the rapidly changing global security environment. It built upon the 2015 Strategic Defence and Security Review (SDSR) but expanded its focus beyond traditional military capabilities to include diplomacy, development, and domestic resilience. The review's primary purpose was to integrate these aspects into a unified national security strategy, ensuring that the UK's military, intelligence, and foreign policy efforts were well-coordinated.

== Description ==
The NSCR set several key priorities aimed at safeguarding the UK's national security. These included strengthening defences against terrorism, cyberattacks, and state-based threats while enhancing the UK's global influence through diplomatic, military, and development engagements. Another critical objective was linking national security with economic prosperity by ensuring economic stability in tandem with security measures. Additionally, the review sought to improve collaboration across various government agencies to create a more cohesive national security strategy.

One of the most significant outcomes of the NSCR was the introduction of the Fusion Doctrine, a policy framework designed to align national security policy with economic and foreign policy by fostering interdepartmental cooperation. The review also recommended expanding the UK's cyber defence capabilities, increasing investment in military and intelligence operations, enhancing counterterrorism efforts, and strengthening partnerships with NATO and other international organizations.

== Controversy ==
Some analysts and policymakers said that the review lacked sufficient funding and did not clearly prioritise specific security threats and that its emphasis on cross-government coordination required a cultural shift within Whitehall, which would take time to implement.
