= County of Bentinck =

Bentinck Queensland
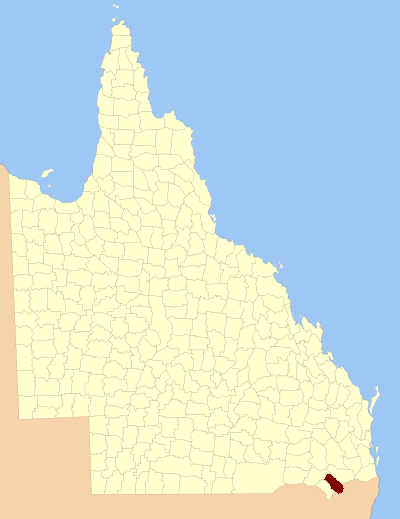
- Location within Queensland
Lands administrative divisions around Bentinck:
Marsh	Merivale	Merivale
Clive	Bentinck	Buller (NSW)
Clive	Clive (NSW)	Clive (NSW)

The County of Bentinck is a county located on the southern boundary of the state of Queensland, Australia. Like all counties in Queensland, it is a non-functional administrative unit, that is used mainly for the purpose of registering land titles. The county was named in 1838 after William Cavendish-Bentinck, 3rd Duke of Portland, who served as Prime Minister of Great Britain twice, in 1783 and again between 1807 and 1809. Population centres within the County of Bentinck include the towns of Stanthorpe, Wallangarra, Glen Aplin, Applethorpe and Inglewood.

== Parishes ==
Parish	LGA	Coordinates	Towns
Ballandean	Southern Downs	28°51′S 151°46′E	
Bodumba	Southern Downs	28°18′S 151°25′E	
Broadwater	Southern Downs	28°46′S 151°53′E	Ballandean, Glen Aplin
Catterthun	Southern Downs	28°39′S 151°39′E	
Coolmunda	Goondiwindi	28°24′S 151°14′E	
Devine	Goondiwindi	28°18′S 151°15′E	
Drumsleed	Southern Downs	28°32′S 151°43′E	
Folkestone	Southern Downs	28°42′S 152°00′E	
Glenelg	Goondiwindi	28°25′S 151°24′E	
Herries	Southern Downs	28°25′S 151°42′E	
Inglewood	Goondiwindi	28°24′S 151°08′E	
Jibbinbar	Southern Downs	28°46′S 151°35′E	
Listohan	Goondiwindi	28°12′S 151°17′E	
Macintyre	Goondiwindi	28°29′S 151°33′E	
Marsh	Southern Downs	28°38′S 151°51′E	
Moynalty	Goondiwindi	28°22′S 151°35′E	Gore
Nundubbermere	Southern Downs	28°44′S 151°45′E	
Pikedale	Southern Downs	28°34′S 151°48′E	Amiens
Stanthorpe	Southern Downs	28°37′S 151°55′E	Stanthorpe, Applethorpe
Tenterfield	Southern Downs	28°53′S 151°57′E	Wallangarra
Terrica	Goondiwindi	28°32′S 151°28′E	Terrica
Warroo	Goondiwindi	28°37′S 151°27′E	Warroo

== See also ==
- Cadastral divisions of Queensland
