= Yarraman, New South Wales =

Yarraman is a locality in north-west New South Wales, Australia around 4 kilometres north of Moree on the Carnarvon Highway. Yarraman is on the banks of the Gwydir River which has been known to flood.

Yarraman is very spread-out with the majority of people living on small acreages.
