= Moree Plains Shire =

- Local government area
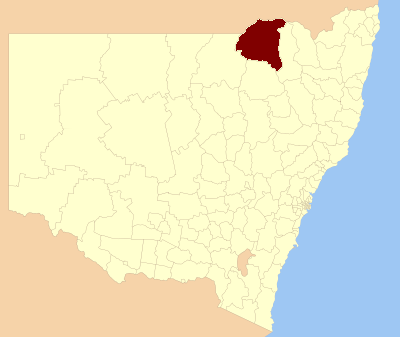
- Location in New South Wales

- Interactive map of Moree Plains Shire
- Coordinates: 29°28′S 149°50′E
- Country: Australia
- State: New South Wales
- Region: North West Slopes
- Council seat: Moree

Government
  - Mayor: Susannah Pearse (Independent)
  - State electorate: Northern Tablelands
  - Federal division: Parkes

Area
  - Total: 17,928 km^{2} (6,922 sq mi)

Population
  - Totals: 13,159 (2016 census); 13,350 (2018 est.)
  - Density: 0.73399/km^{2} (1.90103/sq mi)
- Website: Moree Plains Shire
LGAs around Moree Plains Shire
Balonne (Qld)	Goondiwindi (Qld)	Goondiwindi (Qld)
Walgett	Moree Plains Shire	Gwydir
Walgett	Narrabri	Gwydir

Moree Plains Shire is a local government area in the North West Slopes region of New South Wales, Australia. The northern boundary of the Shire is located adjacent to the border between New South Wales and Queensland. The Shire is located adjacent to the Newell and Gwydir Highways and the North West railway line.

The mayor of Moree Plains Shire Council is Susanna Pearse, an independent politician.

== Towns, villages and localities ==
The main town and seat of council is Moree. Other towns and villages in the Shire include Ashley, Boomi, Boggabilla, Garah, Gurley, Millie, Mungindi, Pallamallawa and Weemelah.

== Heritage listings ==
Moree has a number of heritage-listed sites, including:

- 15 Gwydir Street: Alloway

== Demographics ==
At the 2011 census, there were 13,429 people in the Moree Plains local government area, of these 50.8 per cent were male and 49.2 per cent were female. Aboriginal and Torres Strait Islander people made up 20.8 per cent of the population which is approximately nine times above both the national and state averages of 2.5 per cent. The median age of people in the Moree Plains Shire was 35 years; slightly lower than the national median of 37 years. Children aged 0–14 years made up 23.4 per cent of the population and people aged 65 years and over made up 12.5 per cent of the population. Of people in the area aged 15 years and over, 44.2 per cent were married and 9.9 per cent were either divorced or separated.

Between the 2001 census and the 2011 census the Moree Plains Shire experienced negative population growth in both absolute and real terms. When compared with total population growth of Australia for the same periods, being 5.78 per cent and 8.32 per cent respectively, population growth in the Moree Plains local government area was significantly lower than the national average. The median weekly income for residents within the Moree Plains Shire was generally close to the national average.

At the 2011 census, the proportion of residents in the Moree Plains local government area who stated their ancestry as Australian or Anglo-Saxon exceeded 77 per cent of all residents (national average was 65.2 per cent). In excess of 70 per cent of all residents in the Moree Plains Shire nominated a religious affiliation with Christianity at the 2011 census, which was significantly higher than the national average of 50.2 per cent. Meanwhile, as at the census date, compared to the national average, households in the Moree Plains local government area had a significantly lower than average proportion (3.6 per cent) where two or more languages are spoken (national average was 20.4 per cent); and a significantly higher proportion (89.4 per cent) where English only was spoken at home (national average was 76.8 per cent).

=== Selected historical census data ===
Selected historical census data for Moree Plains Shire local government area
Census year		2001	2006	2011
Population	Estimated residents on Census night	15,680	▼13,976	▼13,429
Population	LGA rank in terms of size within New South Wales		81st	
Population	% of New South Wales population		0.23%	▼0.19%
Population	% of Australian population	0.08%	▼0.07%	▼0.06%
Cultural and language diversity				
Ancestry, top responses	Australian			34.1%
Ancestry, top responses	English			28.5%
Ancestry, top responses	Irish			8.5%
Ancestry, top responses	Scottish			6.2%
Ancestry, top responses	Australian Aboriginal			5.6%
Language, top responses (other than English)	Tamil	n/c	n/c	▲0.2%
Language, top responses (other than English)	Cantonese	0.2%	0.2%	0.2%
Language, top responses (other than English)	Afrikaans	n/c	▲0.1%	▼0.2%
Language, top responses (other than English)	Serbian	0.2%	▼0.3%	▼0.1%
Language, top responses (other than English)	Hindi	n/c	n/c	▲0.1%
Religious affiliation				
Religious affiliation, top responses	Anglican	37.7%	▼35.8%	▼32.3%
Religious affiliation, top responses	Catholic	29.9%	▼28.9%	▲29.5%
Religious affiliation, top responses	No Religion	5.7%	▲7.1%	▲11.7%
Religious affiliation, top responses	Presbyterian and Reformed	5.9%	▼5.3%	▼4.7%
Religious affiliation, top responses	Uniting Church	4.8%	▼3.8%	▼3.7%
Median weekly incomes				
Personal income	Median weekly personal income		A$471	A$558
Personal income	% of Australian median personal income		101.1%	▼96.7%
Family income	Median weekly family income		A$1,089	A$1,253
Family income	% of Australian median family income		93.0%	▼84.6%
Household income	Median weekly household income		A$946	A$1,053
Household income	% of Australian median household income		92.1%	▼85.3%

== Council ==
=== Current composition and election method ===
Moree Plains Shire Council is composed of nine councillors elected proportionally as a single ward. All councillors are elected for a fixed four-year term of office. The mayor is elected by the councillors at the first meeting of the council. The most recent election was held on 14 October 2024, and the makeup of the council is as follows:

Party	Seats
Independents	9
Total	9

The current council, elected in 2024, in order of election, is:

Councillor	Party	Notes
Susannah Pearse	Independent	
Wayne Tighe	Independent	
Brooke Sauer	Independent	
Kelly James	Independent	
Peter Mailler	Independent	
Dominique Hodgkinson	Independent	
Frederick McGrady	Independent	
Debra Williams	Independent	
Kerry Cassells	Independent	

== Past councillors ==
=== 2016−present ===
Year	Councillor	Councillor	Councillor	Councillor	Councillor	Councillor	Councillor	Councillor	Councillor
2016	Katrina Humphries (Ind.)	Sue Price (Ind.)	Stephen Ritchie (Ind.)	John Tramby (Ind.)	Mike Montgomery (Ind.)	George Chiu (Ind.)	Greg Smith (Ind.)	Kerry Cassells (Ind.)	Jim Crawford (Ind.)
2021	Mark Johnson (Ind.)	Lisa Orchin (Ind.)	Susannah Pearse (Ind.)	Brooke Sauer (Ind.)	Mike Montgomery (Ind.)	Murray Hartin (Ind.)	Greg Smith (Ind.)	Kelly James (Independent Liberal)	Mekayla Cochrane (Ind.)

== Election results ==
=== 2024 ===
2024 New South Wales local elections: Moree Plains
Party	Candidate	Votes	%	±%
Independent	1. Susannah Pearse (Ind. Nat) (elected); 2. Brooke Sauer (elected)	1,610	27.73	
Independent	Wayne Tighe (elected)	844	14.54	
Independent Liberal	Kelly James (elected)	578	9.96	
Independent	Pete Mailler (elected)	506	8.72	
Independent	Dominique Hodgkinson (elected)	429	7.39	
Independent	Frederick McGrady (elected)	271	4.67	
Independent National	Debra Williams (elected)	229	3.94	
Independent	Kerry Cassells (elected)	215	3.70	
Independent	Karen Munn	208	3.58	
Independent	Stephen Ritchie	203	3.50	
Independent	Mekayla Cochrane	198	3.41	
Independent	Michael Ivanov	189	3.26	
Independent Labor	Meryl Dillon	175	3.01	
Independent Labor	Liz Taylor	151	2.60	
Total formal votes		5,806		
Informal votes		552		
Turnout		6,358		

=== 2021 ===
2021 New South Wales local elections: Moree Plains
Party	Candidate	Votes	%	±%
Independent	1. Mark Johnson (elected); 2. Lisa Orchin (elected)	1,759	30.4	
Independent	1. Susannah Pearse (elected); 2. Brooke Sauer (elected)	876	15.1	
Independent	1. Greg Smith (elected); 2. Murray Hartin (elected)	798	13.8	
Independent	1. Stephen Ritchie; 2. Kerry Cassells; 3. Noel Dean	531	9.2	
Independent	Kelly James (elected)	446	7.7	
Independent	Mike Montgomery (elected)	444	7.7	
Independent	Mekayla Cochrane (elected)	299	5.2	
Independent	Glen Crump	182	3.1	
Independent	George Chiu	162	2.8	
Independent	Stephen Garrett	150	2.6	
Independent	Michael Ivanov	142	2.5	
Total formal votes		5,789	95.2	
Informal votes		289	4.8	
Turnout		6,078	73.5	

== Other ==
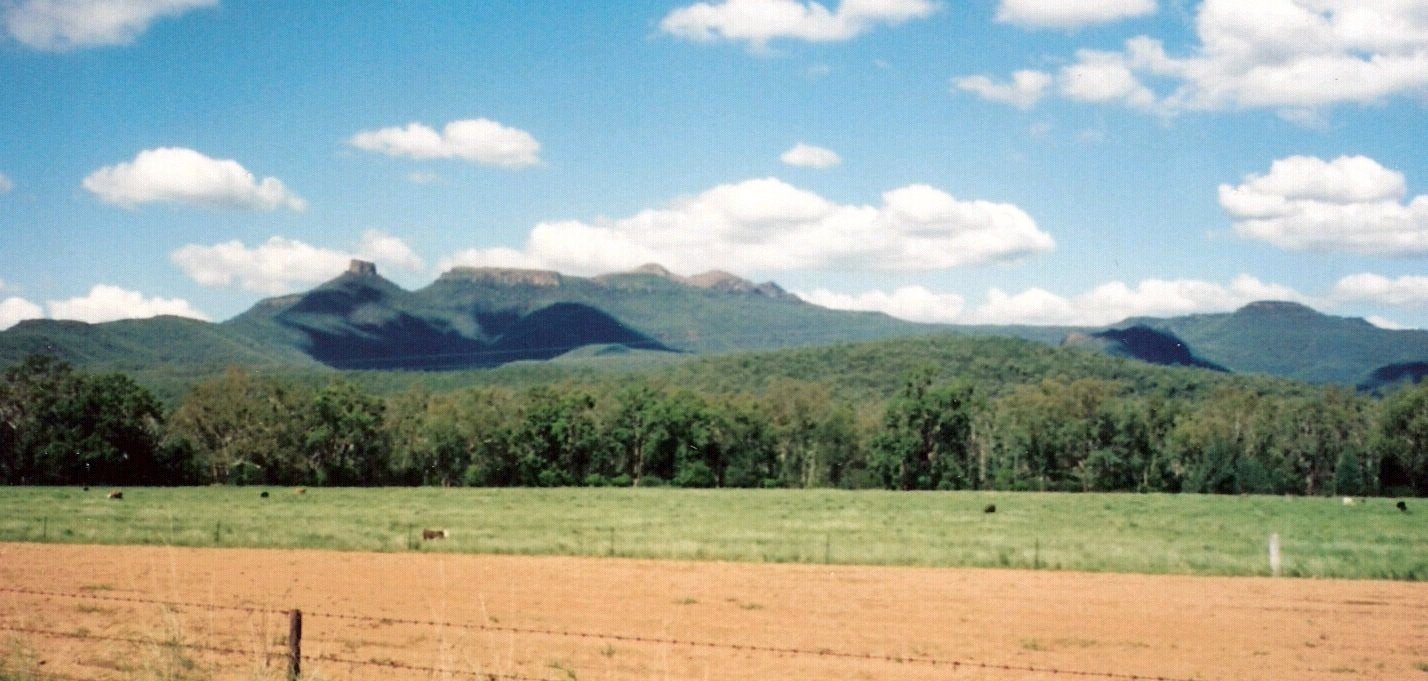
View of farmlands from the Newell Highway at the base of the Nandewar Range in the south east of the shire

A 2011 research study reported that:

- Population and employment in Moree Plains has steadily declined over the last two decades. Between 2001 and 2006 Moree Plains saw the greatest net migration change amongst the study areas with 1741 people moving out of the area
- There was a corresponding decline in employment
- In 2005–06 the Moree Plains economy was estimated to have a Gross Regional Product of A$605 million
- The unstable economy is not conducive to investment and development, including the provision of services

The Moree Artesian Aquatics Centre (MAAC), first established in 1896, attracts visitors from around Australia and overseas to "take the waters", an activity particularly popular with immigrants from eastern and southern Europe and eastern Asia. Moree itself sits at the south-eastern extremity of the Great Artesian Basin, a vast underground water resource covering much of eastern and central Australia. The MAAC has recently undergone a $7millon redevelopment. Along with the artesian pools and FINA standard Olympic pool, it also has a program pool, children's hidroplay area and a giant waterslide.

Moree also known as the Home of the Big Rocket. There is 14-metre rocket and a space themed command centre playground, along with a double swing set in local Kirkby Park. A Liberty Swing for disabled children is installed alongside the Rocket.

The Shire has a relatively high Indigenous Australian population (seventeen per cent), and in recent years has achieved recognition for its Aboriginal Employment Strategy, targeting indigenous employment in the mainstream workforce through a process of mentoring and counselling of both employer and employee.

Moree Plains Shire is the most productive agricultural Local Government area in Australia, averaging around A$1Billion per year in agricultural primary production.

Current produce includes wheat, barley, sorghum, pulses, cotton, maize, beef, sheep, wool, olives, pecans, and canola. Historically, the area has been known for also growing sunflowers. Both as a cash crop and as a polyculture crop. Though sunflower cropping has decreased, wild sunflowers are extremely abundant in the central shire.
