= Narrabri =

- Town
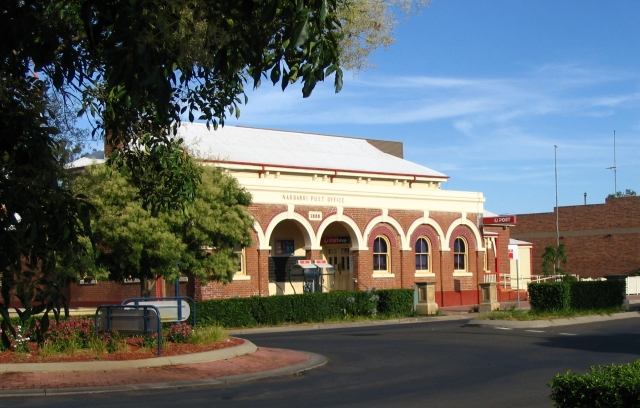
- Post Office, 2005

- Coordinates: 30°19′0″S 149°46′0″E
- Country: Australia
- State: New South Wales
- LGA: Narrabri Shire
- Location: 521 km (324 mi) NW of Sydney; 575 km (357 mi) SW of Brisbane; 280 km (170 mi) NE of Dubbo; 172 km (107 mi) NW of Tamworth; 101 km (63 mi) S of Moree
- Established: 1860

Government
  - State electorate: Barwon
  - Federal division: Parkes
- Elevation: 212 m (696 ft)

Population
  - Total: 5,499 (2021 census)
- Postcode: 2390
- County: Nandewar
- Mean max temp: 26.5 °C (79.7 °F)
- Mean min temp: 11.7 °C (53.1 °F)
- Annual rainfall: 661.9 mm (26.06 in)

Narrabri (/ˈnærəbraɪ/ NARR-ə-bry) is a locality and seat of Narrabri Shire local government area in the North West Slopes, New South Wales, Australia on the Namoi River, 521 kilometres (324 mi) northwest of Sydney. It sits on the junction of the Kamilaroi Highway and the Newell Highway. At the 2021 census, the town of Narrabri had a population of 5,499.

Because of the geography of Narrabri and the surrounding areas, Narrabri township was quite prone to flooding and fire. Recently, changes have been made to the river flow to improve overall safety.

It is the centre of a major cotton-growing industry. Other agricultural industries in the area include wheat, beef, and lamb. Nearby attractions are Mount Kaputar National Park, the Australia Telescope Compact Array at the Paul Wild Observatory (administered by the CSIRO), and a number of agricultural centres. Just to the south of town is the Pilliga Forest, the largest remnant temperate forest in Eastern Australia. Narrabri also has The Crossing Theatre, a 1,000-seat auditorium and cinema complex.

== History ==
Before the arrival of the Europeans in the early 19th century, Narrabri was the home of the Gamilaroi people, who still constitute a significant part of the local population. Narrabri derives its name from an early property in the district called the Narrabri Run. The name Narrabri is Aboriginal in origin and has several possible meanings which include 'snake place', 'big creek', or 'Forked Sticks'. It is possibly means "with a knot"

In 1860, Narrabri was proclaimed a town and a year later, on 1 June 1861, Narrabri Post Office opened. Other buildings followed, with the hospital and the first courthouse (1864–65), the school (1868), the police station (1878–79) and post office (1879). During the 1880s the gaol and the second courthouse were built.

== Heritage listings ==
Narrabri has a number of heritage-listed sites, including:

- Bowen Street: Narrabri Gaol and Residence
- 138–140 Maitland Street: Narrabri Post Office

== Climate ==
Narrabri has a textbook subtropical climate with very hot, somewhat humid summers and mild, sunny winters that are often warm by day. Frosts are frequent in the winter months, though it tends to warm rapidly by the late morning. Severe thunderstorms are a regular occurrence.

=== Narrabri West Post Office (1962–2002) ===
Climate data for Narrabri West Post Office (1962–2002)
Month	Jan	Feb	Mar	Apr	May	Jun	Jul	Aug	Sep	Oct	Nov	Dec	Year
Record high °C (°F)	43.4 (110.1)	42.3 (108.1)	40.6 (105.1)	37.9 (100.2)	31.3 (88.3)	26.9 (80.4)	26.7 (80.1)	32.1 (89.8)	36.6 (97.9)	40.7 (105.3)	43.0 (109.4)	43.3 (109.9)	43.4 (110.1)
Mean daily maximum °C (°F)	33.8 (92.8)	33.2 (91.8)	31.2 (88.2)	27.3 (81.1)	22.5 (72.5)	18.7 (65.7)	18.0 (64.4)	19.8 (67.6)	23.4 (74.1)	27.1 (80.8)	30.1 (86.2)	33.0 (91.4)	26.5 (79.7)
Mean daily minimum °C (°F)	19.3 (66.7)	19.1 (66.4)	16.4 (61.5)	11.9 (53.4)	8.3 (46.9)	5.2 (41.4)	3.7 (38.7)	4.6 (40.3)	7.6 (45.7)	11.7 (53.1)	14.8 (58.6)	17.7 (63.9)	11.7 (53.1)
Record low °C (°F)	10.6 (51.1)	7.8 (46.0)	5.6 (42.1)	0.7 (33.3)	−3.3 (26.1)	−5.6 (21.9)	−4.4 (24.1)	−3.9 (25.0)	−1.7 (28.9)	−0.6 (30.9)	3.9 (39.0)	6.0 (42.8)	−5.6 (21.9)
Average rainfall mm (inches)	84.2 (3.31)	63.6 (2.50)	57.0 (2.24)	39.1 (1.54)	48.0 (1.89)	48.1 (1.89)	46.8 (1.84)	40.7 (1.60)	42.1 (1.66)	52.5 (2.07)	61.2 (2.41)	77.8 (3.06)	661.9 (26.06)
Average rainy days (≥ 0.2 mm)	5.9	5.3	4.9	3.7	4.5	5.6	5.3	5.0	4.9	5.8	6.2	6.6	63.7
Source: Bureau of Meteorology

=== Narrabri Airport AWS (2001–2024) ===
Climate data for Narrabri Airport AWS (2001–2024)
Month	Jan	Feb	Mar	Apr	May	Jun	Jul	Aug	Sep	Oct	Nov	Dec	Year
Record high °C (°F)	47.8 (118.0)	46.5 (115.7)	40.2 (104.4)	34.8 (94.6)	29.7 (85.5)	26.0 (78.8)	26.5 (79.7)	31.7 (89.1)	34.9 (94.8)	40.8 (105.4)	44.0 (111.2)	44.4 (111.9)	47.8 (118.0)
Mean daily maximum °C (°F)	34.9 (94.8)	33.7 (92.7)	31.0 (87.8)	27.0 (80.6)	22.4 (72.3)	18.5 (65.3)	18.1 (64.6)	20.0 (68.0)	24.2 (75.6)	28.3 (82.9)	31.3 (88.3)	33.2 (91.8)	26.9 (80.4)
Mean daily minimum °C (°F)	20.5 (68.9)	19.6 (67.3)	16.8 (62.2)	12.5 (54.5)	7.5 (45.5)	5.8 (42.4)	4.0 (39.2)	4.5 (40.1)	8.1 (46.6)	12.3 (54.1)	16.1 (61.0)	18.6 (65.5)	12.2 (54.0)
Record low °C (°F)	8.4 (47.1)	9.2 (48.6)	4.1 (39.4)	0.3 (32.5)	−3.3 (26.1)	−4.6 (23.7)	−6.0 (21.2)	−3.6 (25.5)	−1.2 (29.8)	2.1 (35.8)	4.3 (39.7)	5.6 (42.1)	−6.0 (21.2)
Average rainfall mm (inches)	67.3 (2.65)	58.3 (2.30)	60.5 (2.38)	28.2 (1.11)	23.9 (0.94)	48.4 (1.91)	28.2 (1.11)	29.4 (1.16)	30.9 (1.22)	39.2 (1.54)	67.7 (2.67)	69.7 (2.74)	552.7 (21.76)
Average rainy days (≥ 0.2 mm)	6.9	7.4	7.4	5.0	4.5	8.2	6.6	5.0	5.6	6.8	7.9	8.7	80.0
Source: Australian Bureau of Meteorology; Narrabri Airport AWS

Over the years, Narrabri has had a number of weather stations run by the Bureau of Meteorology or other government agencies. Narrabri West Post Office made rainfall observations from the late 1800s. From June 1960 until August 2002, it observed and reported other weather elements such as temperature and wind speed. Since then it only reports rainfall. The current weather station for Narrabri is Narrabri Airport Automatic Weather Station (AWS), which began observations in 2001.

=== Significant weather events ===
On 4 January 1902, a severe thunderstorm, with large hail and destructive winds, struck the town, with many buildings either damaged or destroyed. The storm, which lasted only five minutes, was described as a 'cyclone'. One man died after being struck by lightning and another two people were injured by the storm. Damage caused by the storm was estimated to be around £3,000.

== Media ==
Narrabri has a twice-weekly published newspaper, The Courier, one of the few remaining independent regional newspapers in Australia.

A local volunteer-run community radio station, 2MAX FM services the area, broadcasting on 91.3 MHz FM, from the nearby Mt Dowe, and is able to cover a very large area due to this altitude. The station started in 2006. 2MAX FM has a focus on country music and older listeners.

== Transport ==
Regional airline Link Airways operates scheduled flights to and from Brisbane and Sydney on Tuesdays and Thursdays. The town is also served by charter flights. It is almost equidistant from Brisbane and Sydney.

=== Railway station ===
Narrabri railway station is on the Mungindi line, 569 kilometres (354 mi) from Sydney. The station opened in 1897 and is served by a single daily Xplorer diesel railmotor between Sydney and Moree.

Narrabri is an important centre for rail freight, with considerable infrastructure improvements since the mid-1990s.

== Sports Teams ==
The most popular sport in Narrabri by a considerable margin is Rugby league. The local team, the Narrabri Blues, were founded in 1921 and play at Collins Park. They currently compete in the Group 4 Rugby League competition, in which they have won five premierships, the last of which came in 1990.

Other sports teams include the Narrabri Eagles AFC and Narrabri Blue Boars RUFC.

== Coal seam gas proposal ==
In 2019, a coal seam gas field was proposed for the Narrabri area. As of 2019 It will extend west to Yarrie Lake, which will be surrounded by 450 gas well pads with 850 gas wells over the following 20 years if the project goes ahead. The project was opposed by a coalition of rural residents and urban environmentalists.

== Popular culture ==
Narrabri is referenced in the song Tucker's Daughter, by Australian rock singer Ian Moss, where the action takes place on a cotton farm on the plains of Narrabri.

Narrabri is proposing to build a "big slug" to celebrate the Mt Kaputar pink slug.

== Population ==
Historical population
Year	Pop.	±%
1921	2,382	—
1933	3,946	+65.7%
1947	3,329	−15.6%
1954	3,722	+11.8%
1961	5,423	+45.7%
1966	6,037	+11.3%
1971	6,893	+14.2%
1976	6,951	+0.8%
1981	7,926	+14.0%
1986	7,246	−8.6%
1991	6,694	−7.6%
1996	6,419	−4.1%
2001	6,234	−2.9%
2006	6,102	−2.1%
2011	5,890	−3.5%
2016	5,903	+0.2%
2021	5,499	−6.8%
Source: Australian Bureau of Statistics data.

According to the 2021 Australian census, there were 12,703 people in Narrabri Shire and 5,499 people in Narrabri itself.

- Aboriginal and Torres Strait Islander people made up 14.8% of the population.
- 84.0% of people were born in Australia and 86.9% of people spoke only English at home.
- The most common responses for religion were No Religion at 28.4%, Anglican at 26.1% and Catholic at 22.3%.

== Notable residents ==
- Peter Hall, architect who led the completion of the Sydney Opera House after the resignation of Jørn Utzon.
- Jeff Hardy, Australian Paralympic swimmer
- Chris Latham, former Australian Wallaby rugby union player
- Sam Naismith, Australian rules footballer
- Ernest Riddle, former Governor of the Commonwealth Bank
- Jason Stoltenberg, former international tennis player. World #1 junior player in 1987
- Jamie Lyon, former National Rugby League player for the Manly Sea Eagles and New South Wales Origin.
- Darrell Trindall, rugby league footballer of the 1990s
- Dorothy Jenner (Andrea), (1891–1985) Actor, Art Director, Journalist, Scriptwriter, War Correspondent
