= Narrabri Shire =

- Local government area
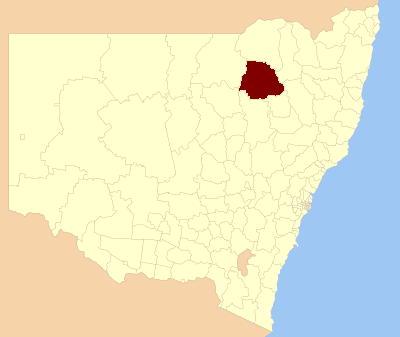
- Location in New South Wales

- Interactive map of Narrabri Shire
- Coordinates: 30°19′S 149°46′E
- Country: Australia
- State: New South Wales
- Region: North West Slopes
- Established: 1 January 1981
- Council seat: Narrabri

Government
  - Mayor: Darrell Tiemens (Independent)
  - State electorate: Barwon
  - Federal division: Parkes

Area
  - Total: 13,031 km^{2} (5,031 sq mi)

Population
  - Total: 12,703 (2021 census)
  - Density: 0.97483/km^{2} (2.52480/sq mi)
- Website: Narrabri Shire
LGAs around Narrabri Shire
Walgett	Moree Plains	Gwydir
Walgett	Narrabri Shire	Tamworth
Coonamble	Warrumbungle	Gunnedah

Narrabri Shire is a local government area in the North West Slopes region of New South Wales, Australia. The Shire is located adjacent to the Namoi River and the Newell and Kamilaroi Highways.

It was formed on 1 January 1981 from the amalgamation of the Municipality of Narrabri and Namoi Shire resulting from the Local Government Areas Amalgamation Act 1980.

The mayor of Narrabri Shire Council is Darrell Tiemens, who is an independent.

== Towns and localities ==
The seat of Council and major town in the Shire is Narrabri. Other towns, villages and localities in the Shire include Baan Baa, Bellata, Boggabri, Edgeroi, Gwabegar, Pilliga, and Wee Waa.

== Heritage listings ==
The Narrabri Shire has a number of heritage-listed sites, including:

- Narrabri, Bowen Street: Narrabri Gaol and Residence

== Demographics ==
At the 2011 census, there were 12,925 people in the Narrabri local government area, of these 50.1 per cent were male and 49.9 per cent were female. Aboriginal and Torres Strait Islander people made up 10.7% of the population which is more than four times higher than both the national and state averages. The median age of people in the Narrabri Shire was 39 years; slightly higher than the national median of 37 years. Children aged 0–14 years made up 22.2% of the population and people aged 65 years and over made up 15.7% of the population. Of people in the area aged 15 years and over, half were married and 10.3% were either divorced or separated.

Between the 2001 census and the 2011 census the Narrabri Shire experienced negative population growth in both absolute and real terms. When compared with total population growth of Australia for the same periods, being 5.78% and 8.32% respectively, population growth in the Narrabri local government area was significantly lower than the national average. The median weekly income for residents within the Narrabri Shire was significantly below the national average.

At the 2011 census, the proportion of residents in the Narrabri local government area who stated their ancestry as Australian or Anglo-Saxon exceeded 88% of all residents (national average was 65.2%). In excess of 80% of all residents in the Narrabri Shire nominated a religious affiliation with Christianity at the 2011 census, which was significantly higher than the national average of 50.2%. Meanwhile, as at the census date, compared to the national average, households in the Narrabri local government area had a significantly lower than average proportion (2.3%) where two or more languages are spoken (national average was 20.4%); and a significantly higher proportion (93.6%) where English only was spoken at home (national average was 76.8%).

Selected historical census data for Narrabri Shire local government area
Census year		2001	2006	2011
Population	Estimated residents on Census night	13,800	▼13,119	▼12,925
Population	LGA rank in terms of size within New South Wales			
Population	% of New South Wales population			0.19%
Population	% of Australian population	0.07%	0.07%	▼0.06%
Cultural and language diversity				
Ancestry, top responses	Australian			41.2%
Ancestry, top responses	English			29.5%
Ancestry, top responses	Irish			7.9%
Ancestry, top responses	Scottish			6.7%
Ancestry, top responses	German			2.9%
Language, top responses (other than English)	Cantonese	0.1%	0.1%	▲0.2%
Language, top responses (other than English)	German	0.2%	▼0.1%	0.1%
Language, top responses (other than English)	Filipino	0.1	▼ n/c	▲0.1%
Language, top responses (other than English)	Afrikaans	n/c	n/c	▲0.1%
Language, top responses (other than English)	Spanish	n/c	n/c	▲0.1%
Religious affiliation				
Religious affiliation, top responses	Anglican	41.7%	▼40.5%	▼38.0%
Religious affiliation, top responses	Catholic	26.9%	▼26.3%	26.3%
Religious affiliation, top responses	No Religion	6.3%	▲9.5%	▲12.4%
Religious affiliation, top responses	Presbyterian and Reformed	7.0%	▼6.2%	▼5.7%
Religious affiliation, top responses	Uniting Church	5.1%	▼4.4%	▼4.2%
Median weekly incomes				
Personal income	Median weekly personal income		A$410	A$520
Personal income	% of Australian median income		88.0%	90.1%
Family income	Median weekly family income		A$1,034	A$1,246
Family income	% of Australian median income		88.3%	84.1%
Household income	Median weekly household income		A$792	A$982
Household income	% of Australian median income		77.1%	79.6%

== Council ==
=== Current composition and election method ===
Narrabri Shire Council is composed of nine councillors elected proportionally as a single ward. All councillors are elected for a fixed four-year term of office. The mayor is elected by the councillors at the first meeting of the council. The most recent election was held on 14 September 2024, and the makeup of the council is as follows:

Party	Councillors
Independent	7
Independent National	1
Independent Labor	1
Total	9

The current Council, elected in 2024, is:

Councillor	Party	Notes
Amanda Brown	Independent	
Brett Dickinson	Independent	
Navin Erathnage	Independent	
Jocellin Jansson	Independent National	
Gregory Lamont	Independent	
Brett Nolan	Independent	
Joshua Roberts-Garnsey	Independent Labor	
Darrell Tiemens	Independent	
Ethan Towns	Independent	

== Election results ==
=== 2024 ===
2024 New South Wales local elections: Narrabri
Party	Candidate	Votes	%	±%
Independent	1. Darrell Tiemens (elected); 2. Amanda Brown (elected); 3. Mark Strahle; 4. Peter Harvey (Ind. Science); 5. Karen Kirkby	1,775	23.9	+15.7
Independent	1. Brett Nolan (elected); 2. Jocellin Jansson (Ind. Nat) (elected); 3. Matthew Nolan; 4. Kodey Stanford; 5. Kat Denniss	1,415	19.1	
Independent	1. Ethan Towns (elected); 2. Andrew Dewson; 3. Roxanne Whitton; 4. Ryan Whillas; 5. Bernadette Melton	1,175	15.8	
Independent Labor	1. Joshua Roberts-Garnsey (elected); 2. Emma Alexanderson; 3. Rohan Boehm (Ind.); 4. Ian Duffey; 5. Robert Browning (Ind.)	721	9.7	
Independent	1. Gregory Lamont (elected); 2. James (Jock) Duncan; 3. Jennifer Wilson; 4. Marilyn Binge; 5. John Carrigan	594	8.0	−17.8
Independent	Navin Erathnage (elected)	368	5.0	
Independent	Peter Guest	362	4.9	
Independent	1. Ian Passmore; 2. Lloyd Bennett; 3. Damian Oudenryn; 4. Mark Crutcher; 5. Kent Ferguson	259	3.5	
Independent	Brett Dickinson (elected)	207	2.8	−2.2
Independent	Ken Flower	170	2.3	
Independent	Catherine Redding	157	2.1	−3.0
Independent	Colin Armstrong	145	2.0	
Independent	Glen Stoltenberg	67	0.9	
Independent	Matthew Bullock	10	0.13	
Total formal votes		7,425		
Informal votes		421		
Turnout		7,846		
