= Electoral results for the Division of Warringah =

Australian division election results

This is a list of electoral results for the Division of Warringah in Australian federal elections from the division's creation in 1922 until the present.

== Members ==
Member	Party	Term
Sir Granville Ryrie	Nationalist	1922–1927
(Sir) Archdale Parkhill	Nationalist	1927 by–1931
(Sir) Archdale Parkhill	United Australia	1931–1937
Percy Spender	Ind. United Australia	1937–1938
Percy Spender	United Australia	1938–1944
Percy Spender	Liberal	1944–1951
Francis Bland	Liberal	1951–1961
John Cockle	Liberal	1961–1966
Edward St John	Liberal	1966–1969
Edward St John	Independent	1969–1969
Michael MacKellar	Liberal	1969–1994
Tony Abbott	Liberal	1994 by–2019
Zali Steggall	Independent	2019–present

== Election results ==
=== Elections in the 2020s ===
==== 2025 ====
2025 Australian federal election: Warringah
Party	Candidate	Votes	%	±%
Independent	Zali Steggall			
Labor	Celine Varghese-Fell			
Trumpet of Patriots	Anthony Rose			
Independent	David Michael Spratt			
Libertarian	Sean McLeod			
One Nation	Gavin Wright			
Liberal	Jaimee Rogers			
Greens	Bonnie Harvey			
Total formal votes				
Informal votes				
Turnout				

==== 2022 ====
2022 Australian federal election: Warringah
Party	Candidate	Votes	%	±%
Independent	Zali Steggall	41,832	44.82	+1.36
Liberal	Katherine Deves	31,129	33.35	−5.66
Labor	David Mickleburgh	7,806	8.36	+1.75
Greens	Kristyn Glanville	6,910	7.40	+1.27
United Australia	Andrew Robertson	2,202	2.36	+1.68
One Nation	Steven Tripp	1,980	2.12	+2.12
Animal Justice	Kate Paterson	1,475	1.58	+0.18
Total formal votes		93,334	97.06	+2.11
Informal votes		2,829	2.94	−2.11
Turnout		96,163	91.34	−1.06
Notional two-party-preferred count
Liberal	Katherine Deves	48,001	51.43	−0.69
Labor	David Mickleburgh	45,333	48.57	+0.69
Two-candidate-preferred result
Independent	Zali Steggall	56,892	60.96	+3.72
Liberal	Katherine Deves	36,442	39.04	−3.72
Independent hold		Swing	+3.72	

Alluvial diagram for preference flows in the seat of Warringah in the 2022 federal election. indicates at what stage the winning candidate had over 50% of the votes and was declared the winner.

=== Elections in the 2010s ===
==== 2019 ====
2019 Australian federal election: Warringah
Party	Candidate	Votes	%	±%
Independent	Zali Steggall	40,034	43.46	+43.46
Liberal	Tony Abbott	35,935	39.01	−12.64
Labor	Dean Harris	6,091	6.61	−8.18
Greens	Kristyn Glanville	5,647	6.13	−6.06
Animal Justice	Heather Barnes	1,291	1.40	+1.40
Independent	Susan Moylan	1,111	1.21	+1.21
Sustainable Australia	Emanuele Paletto	678	0.74	+0.74
United Australia	Suellen Wrightson	625	0.68	+0.68
Christian Democrats	Jason Blaiklock	461	0.50	−0.70
Conservative National	Brian Clare	250	0.27	+0.27
Total formal votes		92,123	94.95	+1.03
Informal votes		4,897	5.05	−1.03
Turnout		97,020	92.40	+2.50
Notional two-party-preferred count
Liberal	Tony Abbott	48,011	52.12	−8.97
Labor	Dean Harris	44,112	47.88	+8.97
Two-candidate-preferred result
Independent	Zali Steggall	52,728	57.24	+57.24
Liberal	Tony Abbott	39,395	42.76	−18.79
Independent gain from Liberal		Swing	N/A	

==== 2016 ====
2016 Australian federal election: Warringah
Party	Candidate	Votes	%	±%
Liberal	Tony Abbott	44,759	51.65	−9.19
Labor	Andrew Woodward	12,820	14.79	−4.54
Greens	Clara Williams Roldan	10,565	12.19	−3.33
Independent	James Mathison	9,887	11.41	+11.41
Xenophon	Marie Rowland	5,506	6.35	+6.35
Christian Democrats	June Scifo	1,039	1.20	+0.49
Science	Marc Giordano	800	0.92	+0.92
Arts	Shea Caplice	669	0.77	+0.77
Independent	Tony Backhouse	368	0.42	+0.42
Independent	David Barrow	253	0.29	+0.29
Total formal votes		86,666	93.92	−0.68
Informal votes		5,611	6.08	+0.68
Turnout		92,277	89.90	−2.16
Notional two-party-preferred count
Liberal	Tony Abbott	52,948	61.09	−4.23
Labor	Andrew Woodward	33,718	38.91	+4.23
Two-candidate-preferred result
Liberal	Tony Abbott	53,346	61.55	−3.80
Greens	Clara Williams Roldan	33,320	38.45	+38.45
Liberal hold		Swing	N/A	

==== 2013 ====
2013 Australian federal election: Warringah
Party	Candidate	Votes	%	±%
Liberal	Tony Abbott	54,388	60.89	+1.97
Labor	Jules Zanetti	17,259	19.32	−2.32
Greens	Will Kitching	13,873	15.53	−0.81
Palmer United	Brodie Stewart	1,961	2.20	+2.20
Stable Population	Mike Cottee	744	0.83	+0.83
Christian Democrats	Ula Falanga	630	0.71	+0.71
Rise Up Australia	Mike Bloomfield	472	0.53	+0.53
Total formal votes		89,327	94.62	−0.74
Informal votes		5,078	5.38	+0.74
Turnout		94,405	91.95	−0.19
Two-party-preferred result
Liberal	Tony Abbott	58,374	65.35	+2.26
Labor	Jules Zanetti	30,953	34.65	−2.26
Liberal hold		Swing	+2.26	

==== 2010 ====
2010 Australian federal election: Warringah
Party	Candidate	Votes	%	±%
Liberal	Tony Abbott	50,063	58.92	+4.91
Labor	Hugh Zochling	18,385	21.64	−6.85
Greens	Matthew Drake-Brockman	13,883	16.34	+4.03
Sex Party	Alexander Gutman	2,075	2.44	+2.44
Secular	Kenneth Cooke	566	0.67	+0.67
Total formal votes		84,972	95.36	−1.20
Informal votes		4,135	4.64	+1.20
Turnout		89,107	92.14	−2.69
Two-party-preferred result
Liberal	Tony Abbott	53,612	63.09	+4.31
Labor	Hugh Zochling	31,360	36.91	−4.31
Liberal hold		Swing	+4.31	

=== Elections in the 2000s ===
==== 2007 ====
2007 Australian federal election: Warringah
Party	Candidate	Votes	%	±%
Liberal	Tony Abbott	46,398	54.53	−0.97
Labor	Hugh Zochling	23,317	27.40	+2.29
Greens	Conny Harris	10,660	12.53	+0.71
Independent	Patricia Petersen	1,529	1.80	−0.50
Democrats	Georgina Johanson	1,095	1.29	+1.04
Christian Democrats	Bill McCudden	1,020	1.20	+1.20
Climate Conservatives	Goronwy Price	616	0.72	+0.72
Independent	Brett Middleton	456	0.54	−0.83
Total formal votes		85,091	96.42	+2.18
Informal votes		3,162	3.58	−2.18
Turnout		88,253	93.63	−0.17
Two-party-preferred result
Liberal	Tony Abbott	50,627	59.50	−1.79
Labor	Hugh Zochling	34,464	40.50	+1.79
Liberal hold		Swing	−1.79	

==== 2004 ====
2004 Australian federal election: Warringah
Party	Candidate	Votes	%	±%
Liberal	Tony Abbott	40,798	54.53	+3.08
Labor	Linda Beattie	19,181	25.64	+13.56
Greens	Ian Hehir	8,833	11.81	+8.12
Independent	Patricia Petersen	1,914	2.56	+2.56
One Nation	David Kelly	1,142	1.53	−0.21
Family First	Phil McPherson	1,023	1.37	+1.37
Fishing Party	Edward Kelly	618	0.83	+0.83
Independent	Dian Maie Underwood	524	0.70	+0.70
Independent	Peter Thyer	471	0.63	+0.63
Independent	Neil Francey	312	0.42	+0.42
Total formal votes		74,816	94.11	−2.61
Informal votes		4,684	5.89	+2.61
Turnout		79,500	93.15	−0.54
Two-party-preferred result
Liberal	Tony Abbott	45,250	60.48	−2.18
Labor	Linda Beattie	29,566	39.52	+2.18
Liberal hold		Swing	−2.18	

==== 2001 ====
2001 Australian federal election: Warringah
Party	Candidate	Votes	%	±%
Liberal	Tony Abbott	39,816	51.45	−3.43
Independent	Peter Macdonald	21,490	27.77	+27.77
Labor	Julie Heraghty	9,352	12.08	−15.56
Greens	Keelah Lam	2,859	3.69	−0.40
Democrats	Nina Burridge	2,092	2.70	−3.35
One Nation	David Kelly	1,347	1.74	−3.83
No GST	Christine Ferguson	437	0.56	+0.37
Total formal votes		77,393	96.72	−0.11
Informal votes		2,627	3.28	+0.11
Turnout		80,020	94.16	
Two-party-preferred result
Liberal	Tony Abbott	50,141	62.66	
Labor	Julie Heraghty	29,959	37.34	
Two-candidate-preferred result
Liberal	Tony Abbott	43,085	55.67	−7.31
Independent	Peter Macdonald	34,308	44.33	+44.33
Liberal hold		Swing	−7.31	

=== Elections in the 1990s ===
==== 1998 ====
1998 Australian federal election: Warringah
Party	Candidate	Votes	%	±%
Liberal	Tony Abbott	39,753	55.46	−2.25
Labor	Julie Heraghty	19,730	27.53	+0.88
Democrats	Brett Paterson	4,271	5.96	−0.77
One Nation	Janne Lindrum	3,873	5.40	+5.40
Greens	Keelah Lam	2,970	4.14	−0.71
Christian Democrats	Heath Johnstone	725	1.01	+1.01
Natural Law	Ines Judd	204	0.28	−0.09
Abolish Child Support	Tony Allen	150	0.21	+0.21
Total formal votes		71,676	96.93	−0.18
Informal votes		2,273	3.07	+0.18
Turnout		73,949	93.60	−2.51
Two-party-preferred result
Liberal	Tony Abbott	45,145	62.98	−2.33
Labor	Julie Heraghty	26,531	37.02	+2.33
Liberal hold		Swing	−2.33	

==== 1996 ====
1996 Australian federal election: Warringah
Party	Candidate	Votes	%	±%
Liberal	Tony Abbott	42,217	57.72	+1.61
Labor	Julie Heraghty	19,488	26.64	−7.16
Democrats	Wallace Logue	4,919	6.72	+2.46
Greens	Karen Picken	3,551	4.85	+4.85
Against Further Immigration	Ian Weatherlake	2,701	3.69	+3.69
Natural Law	Beth Eager	271	0.37	−1.69
Total formal votes		73,147	97.11	−0.51
Informal votes		2,178	2.89	+0.51
Turnout		75,325	96.11	+0.64
Two-party-preferred result
Liberal	Tony Abbott	47,476	65.32	+5.06
Labor	Julie Heraghty	25,208	34.68	−5.06
Liberal hold		Swing	+5.06	

==== 1994 by-election ====
1994 Warringah by-election
Party	Candidate	Votes	%	±%
Liberal	Tony Abbott	34,440	54.21	−1.89
Democrats	Troy Anderson	9,932	15.92	+11.66
Independent	Judith Halnan	9,564	15.33	+15.33
Against Further Immigration	Robyn Marion Spencer	8,446	13.54	+13.54
Total formal votes		62,382	96.39	−1.23
Informal votes		2,339	3.61	+1.23
Turnout		64,721	82.79	−12.68
Two-party-preferred result
Liberal	Tony Abbott	39,588	63.46	+3.20
Independent	Judith Halnan	22,794	36.54	+36.54
Liberal hold		Swing	N/A	

==== 1993 ====
1993 Australian federal election: Warringah
Party	Candidate	Votes	%	±%
Liberal	Michael MacKellar	40,983	56.10	+1.34
Labor	Steve Cannane	24,690	33.80	+5.39
Democrats	Simon Disney	3,112	4.26	−11.79
Independent	Hugh Walker	2,762	3.78	+3.78
Natural Law	Catherine Knowles	1,502	2.06	+2.06
Total formal votes		73,049	97.62	+0.19
Informal votes		1,781	2.38	−0.19
Turnout		74,830	95.47	
Two-party-preferred result
Liberal	Michael MacKellar	44,007	60.26	−0.59
Labor	Steve Cannane	29,027	39.74	+0.59
Liberal hold		Swing	−0.59	

==== 1990 ====
1990 Australian federal election: Warringah
Party	Candidate	Votes	%	±%
Liberal	Michael MacKellar	33,831	54.2	−5.5
Labor	David de Montfort	18,168	29.1	−2.1
Democrats	Marcus Weyland	10,412	16.7	+7.6
Total formal votes		62,411	97.4	
Informal votes		1,695	2.6	
Turnout		64,106	94.5	
Two-party-preferred result
Liberal	Michael MacKellar	37,294	59.9	−4.2
Labor	David de Montfort	24,931	40.1	+4.2
Liberal hold		Swing	−4.2	

=== Elections in the 1980s ===
==== 1987 ====
1987 Australian federal election: Warringah
Party	Candidate	Votes	%	±%
Liberal	Michael MacKellar	37,855	59.7	+2.9
Labor	Ian Douglas	19,805	31.2	−3.4
Democrats	Christian Widmair	5,773	9.1	+2.2
Total formal votes		63,433	96.0	
Informal votes		2,609	4.0	
Turnout		66,042	92.5	
Two-party-preferred result
Liberal	Michael MacKellar	40,684	64.1	+3.4
Labor	Ian Douglas	22,748	35.9	−3.4
Liberal hold		Swing	+3.4	

==== 1984 ====
1984 Australian federal election: Warringah
Party	Candidate	Votes	%	±%
Liberal	Michael MacKellar	36,415	56.8	−0.7
Labor	Brian Green	22,188	34.6	−3.2
Democrats	Richard Jones	4,444	6.9	+3.1
Independent	Margaret Broome	1,100	1.7	+1.7
Total formal votes		64,147	94.8	
Informal votes		3,518	5.2	
Turnout		67,665	93.1	
Two-party-preferred result
Liberal	Michael MacKellar	38,908	60.7	+1.0
Labor	Brian Green	25,233	39.3	−1.0
Liberal hold		Swing	+1.0	

==== 1983 ====
1983 Australian federal election: Warringah
Party	Candidate	Votes	%	±%
Liberal	Michael MacKellar	36,549	58.0	−4.5
Labor	John Coombs	23,507	37.3	+8.9
Democrats	Annique Duc	2,403	3.8	−2.5
Progress	Stephen Markey	509	0.8	+0.8
Total formal votes		62,968	98.5	
Informal votes		974	1.5	
Turnout		63,942	95.0	
Two-party-preferred result
Liberal	Michael MacKellar		60.2	−7.2
Labor	John Coombs		39.8	+7.2
Liberal hold		Swing	−7.2	

==== 1980 ====
1980 Australian federal election: Warringah
Party	Candidate	Votes	%	±%
Liberal	Michael MacKellar	39,270	62.5	−0.4
Labor	Desmond Murphy	17,864	28.4	+3.7
Democrats	Arthur Bishop	3,944	6.3	−3.5
Progressive Conservative	John McGrath	1,297	2.1	+2.1
Progress	David Rennie	490	0.8	−1.8
Total formal votes		62,865	98.5	
Informal votes		1,593	2.5	
Turnout		64,458	93.6	
Two-party-preferred result
Liberal	Michael MacKellar		67.4	−2.8
Labor	Desmond Murphy		32.6	+2.8
Liberal hold		Swing	−2.8	

=== Elections in the 1970s ===
==== 1977 ====
1977 Australian federal election: Warringah
Party	Candidate	Votes	%	±%
Liberal	Michael MacKellar	40,984	62.9	−4.4
Labor	Christopher Osborne	16,102	24.7	−6.8
Democrats	Anita Stiller	6,385	9.8	+9.8
Progress	Stephen Keliher	1,677	2.6	+2.6
Total formal votes		65,148	98.0	
Informal votes		1,326	2.0	
Turnout		66,474	94.6	
Two-party-preferred result
Liberal	Michael MacKellar		70.2	+2.2
Labor	Christopher Osborne		29.8	−2.2
Liberal hold		Swing	+2.2	

==== 1975 ====
1975 Australian federal election: Warringah
Party	Candidate	Votes	%	±%
Liberal	Michael MacKellar	40,662	68.5	+7.9
Labor	Allan Hughes	17,990	30.3	−5.0
Independent	Eric Riches	746	1.3	+1.3
Total formal votes		59,398	98.5	
Informal votes		928	1.5	
Turnout		60,326	94.7	
Two-party-preferred result
Liberal	Michael MacKellar		69.2	+6.9
Labor	Allan Hughes		30.8	−6.9
Liberal hold		Swing	+6.9	

==== 1974 ====
1974 Australian federal election: Warringah
Party	Candidate	Votes	%	±%
Liberal	Michael MacKellar	33,962	60.6	+6.0
Labor	Allan Hughes	19,775	35.3	+3.9
Australia	Allan Mann	1,891	3.4	−6.1
Independent	Eric Riches	198	0.4	+0.4
Independent	Edwin Mayne	186	0.3	+0.3
Total formal votes		56,012	98.5	
Informal votes		832	1.5	
Turnout		56,844	94.3	
Two-party-preferred result
Liberal	Michael MacKellar		62.3	−0.2
Labor	Allan Hughes		37.7	+0.2
Liberal hold		Swing	−0.2	

==== 1972 ====
1972 Australian federal election: Warringah
Party	Candidate	Votes	%	±%
Liberal	Michael MacKellar	28,896	54.6	+4.4
Labor	John Oakley	16,631	31.4	+8.2
Australia	Bridget Gilling	5,015	9.5	+9.5
Democratic Labor	Peter Keogh	2,153	4.1	−0.1
Independent	Eric Riches	256	0.5	+0.5
Total formal votes		52,951	98.4	
Informal votes		836	1.6	
Turnout		53,787	93.9	
Two-party-preferred result
Liberal	Michael MacKellar		62.5	−7.6
Labor	John Oakley		37.5	+7.6
Liberal hold		Swing	−7.6	

=== Elections in the 1960s ===
==== 1969 ====
1969 Australian federal election: Warringah
Party	Candidate	Votes	%	±%
Liberal	Michael MacKellar	25,799	50.2	−8.6
Labor	Thomas Reynolds	11,884	23.1	+2.5
Independent	Edward St John	10,589	20.6	+20.6
Democratic Labor	Peter Keogh	2,135	4.2	−0.4
Pensioner Power	Albert Thompson	775	1.5	+1.5
Independent	Eric Riches	163	0.3	+0.3
Total formal votes		51,345	97.8	
Informal votes		1,140	2.2	
Turnout		52,485	92.9	
Two-party-preferred result
Liberal	Michael MacKellar		70.1	−5.7
Labor	Thomas Reynolds		29.9	+5.7
Liberal hold		Swing	−5.7	

==== 1966 ====
1966 Australian federal election: Warringah
Party	Candidate	Votes	%	±%
Liberal	Edward St John	26,387	60.2	−12.3
Labor	Jim McClelland	8,395	19.2	−3.7
Independent	Keith Chambers	6,806	15.5	+15.5
Democratic Labor	Francis Hicks	1,953	4.5	+0.0
Independent	Eric Riches	292	0.7	+0.7
Total formal votes		43,833	96.8	
Informal votes		1,444	3.2	
Turnout		45,277	93.1	
Two-party-preferred result
Liberal	Edward St John		77.2	+1.1
Labor	Jim McClelland		22.8	−1.1
Liberal hold		Swing	+1.1	

==== 1963 ====
1963 Australian federal election: Warringah
Party	Candidate	Votes	%	±%
Liberal	John Cockle	31,478	72.5	+18.9
Labor	John Lancaster	9,964	22.9	−0.2
Democratic Labor	John Plunkett	1,975	4.5	−0.2
Total formal votes		43,417	98.6	
Informal votes		603	1.4	
Turnout		44,020	93.6	
Two-party-preferred result
Liberal	John Cockle		76.1	+10.0
Labor	John Lancaster		23.9	−10.0
Liberal hold		Swing	+10.0	

==== 1961 ====
1961 Australian federal election: Warringah
Party	Candidate	Votes	%	±%
Liberal	John Cockle	22,489	53.6	−19.5
Labor	James Brown	9,706	23.1	+3.8
Independent Liberal	Russel Whybrow	4,322	10.3	+10.3
Independent Liberal	Rex Benson	3,484	8.3	+8.3
Democratic Labor	John Plunkett	1,972	4.7	−2.9
Total formal votes		41,973	97.1	
Informal votes		1,234	2.9	
Turnout		43,207	94.5	
Two-party-preferred result
Liberal	John Cockle		66.1	−13.1
Labor	James Brown		33.9	+13.1
Liberal hold		Swing	−13.1	

=== Elections in the 1950s ===
==== 1958 ====
1958 Australian federal election: Warringah
Party	Candidate	Votes	%	±%
Liberal	Francis Bland	30,534	73.1	−26.9
Labor	Norman Braviner	8,069	19.3	+19.3
Democratic Labor	Peter Keogh	3,163	7.6	+7.6
Total formal votes		41,766	97.2	
Informal votes		1,225	2.8	
Turnout		42,991	94.6	
Two-party-preferred result
Liberal	Francis Bland		79.2	−20.8
Labor	Norman Braviner		20.8	+20.8
Liberal hold		Swing	−20.8	

==== 1955 ====
1955 Australian federal election: Warringah
Party	Candidate	Votes	%	±%
Liberal	Francis Bland	unopposed		
Liberal hold		Swing		

==== 1954 ====
1954 Australian federal election: Warringah
Party	Candidate	Votes	%	±%
Liberal	Francis Bland	22,218	58.3	−17.4
Labor	Ronald Nibbs	8,548	22.4	−1.9
Independent	Ernest White	7,332	19.2	+19.2
Total formal votes		38,098	98.6	
Informal votes		549	1.4	
Turnout		38,647	95.7	
Two-party-preferred result
Liberal	Francis Bland		67.9	−7.8
Labor	Ronald Nibbs		32.1	+7.8
Liberal hold		Swing	−7.8	

==== 1951 ====
1951 Australian federal election: Warringah
Party	Candidate	Votes	%	±%
Liberal	Francis Bland	29,362	75.7	+5.4
Labor	Frank McCullum	9,417	24.3	+24.3
Total formal votes		38,779	98.2	
Informal votes		691	1.8	
Turnout		39,470	95.4	
Liberal hold		Swing	+5.4	

=== Elections in the 1940s ===
==== 1949 ====
1949 Australian federal election: Warringah
Party	Candidate	Votes	%	±%
Liberal	Percy Spender	27,563	70.1	+1.6
Independent Labor	Bill Fisher	8,356	21.3	+21.3
Independent Labor	Norman Chadwick	3,315	8.4	+8.4
Total formal votes		39,234	98.4	
Informal votes		632	1.6	
Turnout		39,866	95.8	
Two-party-preferred result
Liberal	Percy Spender		71.1	+2.4
Independent Labor	Bill Fisher		28.9	+28.9
Liberal hold		Swing	+2.4	

==== 1946 ====
1946 Australian federal election: Warringah
Party	Candidate	Votes	%	±%
Liberal	Percy Spender	48,625	62.8	+14.3
Labor	George Godfrey	28,773	37.2	+3.5
Total formal votes		77,398	98.3	
Informal votes		1,337	1.7	
Turnout		78,735	94.4	
Liberal hold		Swing	+2.3	

==== 1943 ====
1943 Australian federal election: Warringah
Party	Candidate	Votes	%	±%
United Australia	Percy Spender	34,177	48.5	−20.3
Labor	Ronald Ashworth	23,723	33.7	+22.7
Independent	Stephen Stack	9,381	13.3	+13.3
Independent	Gerald Robinson	1,644	2.3	+2.3
One Parliament	Douglas Morris	1,078	1.5	+1.5
Ind. Middle Class	Edward Doherty	425	0.6	+0.6
Total formal votes		70,428	97.5	
Informal votes		1,773	2.5	
Turnout		72,201	95.5	
Two-party-preferred result
United Australia	Percy Spender	42,600	60.5	−15.0
Labor	Ronald Ashworth	27,828	39.5	+15.0
United Australia hold		Swing	−15.0	

==== 1940 ====
1940 Australian federal election: Warringah
Party	Candidate	Votes	%	±%
United Australia	Percy Spender	43,759	68.8	+29.2
Labor	Bessie Frewin	7,012	11.0	−3.0
State Labor	Arthur Warren	6,697	10.5	+10.5
Defence Movement	Patrick Esplin	3,399	5.3	+5.3
United Australia	Joseph Hamlet	2,752	4.3	+4.3
Total formal votes		63,619	97.7	
Informal votes		1,494	2.3	
Turnout		65,113	94.3	
Two-party-preferred result
United Australia	Percy Spender		75.5	+23.6
Labor	Bessie Frewin		24.5	+24.5
United Australia gain from Independent		Swing	+23.6	

=== Elections in the 1930s ===
==== 1937 ====
1937 Australian federal election: Warringah
Party	Candidate	Votes	%	±%
United Australia	Sir Archdale Parkhill	26,568	43.9	−27.4
Ind. United Australia	Percy Spender	17,322	28.6	+28.6
Labor	Walter Salter	8,494	14.0	+14.0
Ind. United Australia	Joseph Hamlet	8,200	13.5	+13.5
Total formal votes		60,584	98.2	
Informal votes		1,118	1.8	
Turnout		61,702	97.2	
Two-party-preferred result
Ind. United Australia	Percy Spender	31,446	51.9	+51.9
United Australia	Sir Archdale Parkhill	29,138	48.1	−29.4
Ind. United Australia gain from United Australia		Swing	+29.4	

==== 1934 ====
1934 Australian federal election: Warringah
Party	Candidate	Votes	%	±%
United Australia	Archdale Parkhill	38,775	71.3	−28.7
Labor (NSW)	Bessie Frewin	8,857	16.3	+16.3
Social Credit	Robert Pearson	6,749	12.4	+12.4
Total formal votes		54,381	97.6	
Informal votes		1,321	2.4	
Turnout		55,702	95.8	
Two-party-preferred result
United Australia	Archdale Parkhill		77.5	+18.2
Labor (NSW)	Bessie Frewin		32.5	+32.5
United Australia hold		Swing	+18.2	

==== 1931 ====
1931 Australian federal election: Warringah
Party	Candidate	Votes	%	±%
United Australia	Archdale Parkhill	29,180	59.3	+47.4
United Australia	Walter Duncan	19,989	40.7	+40.7
Total formal votes		49,169	97.6	
Informal votes		1,187	2.4	
Turnout		50,356	95.8	
United Australia hold		Swing	+47.4	

=== Elections in the 1920s ===
==== 1929 ====
1929 Australian federal election: Warringah
Party	Candidate	Votes	%	±%
Nationalist	Archdale Parkhill	25,129	52.6	−47.4
Ind. People's Party	Richard Windeyer	22,688	47.4	+47.4
Total formal votes		47,817	97.2	
Informal votes		1,391	2.8	
Turnout		49,208	95.7	
Nationalist hold		Swing	−47.4	

==== 1928 ====
1928 Australian federal election: Warringah
Party	Candidate	Votes	%	±%
Nationalist	Archdale Parkhill	unopposed		
Nationalist hold		Swing		

==== 1927 by-election ====
1927 Warringah by-election
Party	Candidate	Votes	%	±%
Nationalist	Archdale Parkhill	22,583	55.8	−24.3
Ind. Nationalist	William Fell	7,477	18.5	+18.5
Labor	Ambrose O'Gorman	4,285	10.6	−1.5
Labor	Thomas Conway	3,159	7.8	+7.8
Constitutionalist	Thomas Roberts	2,990	7.4	+7.4
Total formal votes		40,494	97.8	
Informal votes		928	2.2	
Turnout		41,422	88.4	
Two-party-preferred result
Nationalist	Archdale Parkhill		69.6	−10.5
Labor	Ambrose O'Gorman		30.4	+10.5
Nationalist hold		Swing	−10.5	

==== 1925 ====
1925 Australian federal election: Warringah
Party	Candidate	Votes	%	±%
Nationalist	Sir Granville Ryrie	34,132	80.1	−19.9
Labor	Thomas Conway	8,455	19.9	+19.9
Total formal votes		42,587	98.7	
Informal votes		546	1.3	
Turnout		43,133	92.2	
Nationalist hold		Swing	−19.9	

==== 1922 ====
1922 Australian federal election: Warringah
Party	Candidate	Votes	%	±%
Nationalist	Sir Granville Ryrie	unopposed		
Nationalist notional hold		Swing		
