= Results of the 2024 New South Wales local elections in New England =

2024 New South Wales local elections (New England)
- 14 September 2024

This is a list of results for the 2024 New South Wales local elections in the New England region, including the North West.

The New England and North West region covers 12 local government areas (LGAs), including Tamworth.

== Armidale ==
2024 Armidale Regional Council election
- 14 September 2024

All 9 seats on Armidale Regional Council 5 seats needed for a majority

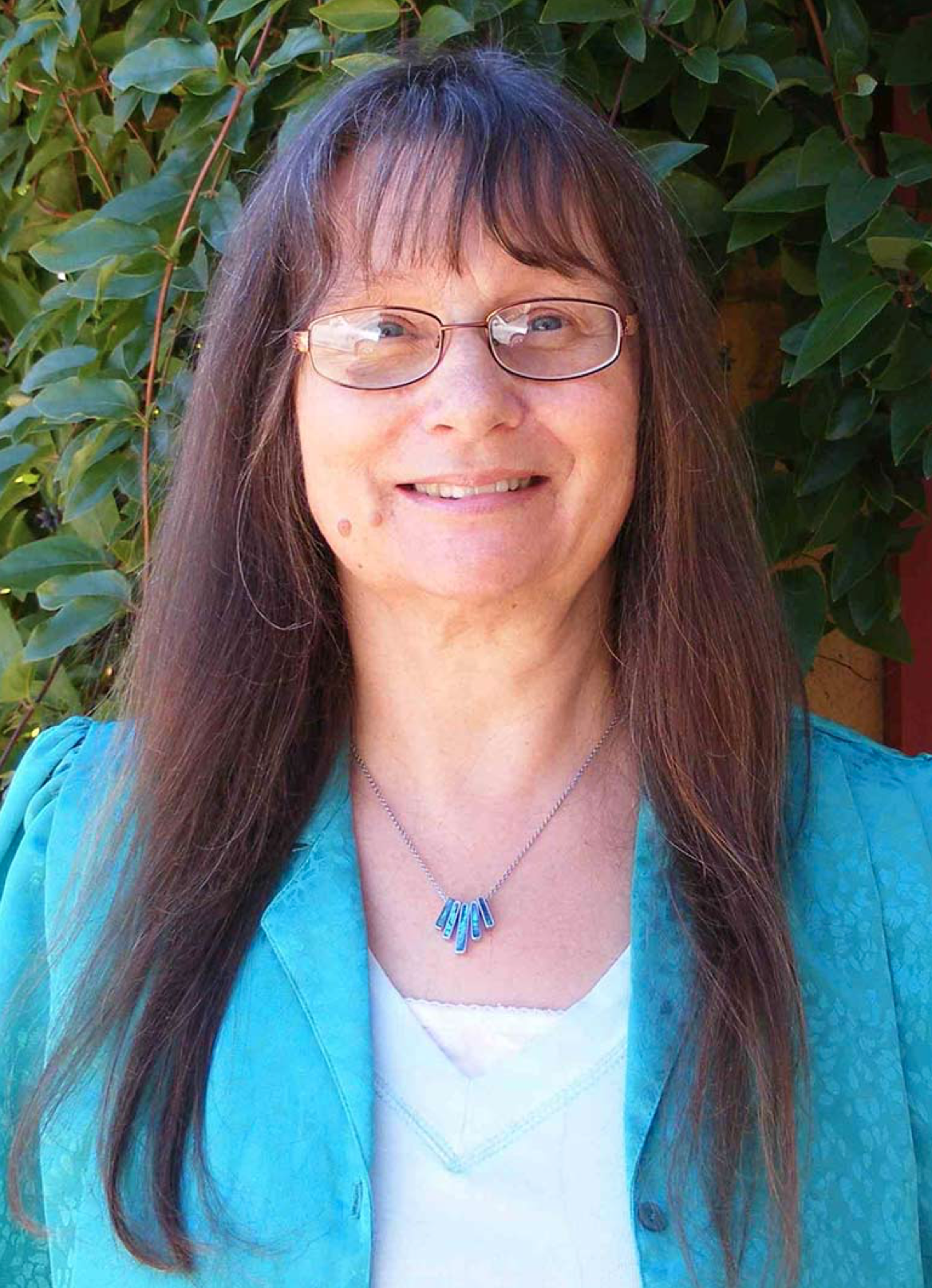
	First party	Second party
	V1G
Leader	Sam Coupland	Susan McMichael
Party	Vote 1 Growth	Labor
Last election	Did not exist	2 seats
Seats before	4	2
Seats won	4	1
Seat change	Steady	▼1
First preference vote	7,528	1,904
Percentage	48.27%	12.21%
Swing	▲48.27	▼3.29
	Third party	Fourth party
	IRA
Leader	Eli Imad	Dorothy Robinson
Party	Alliance	Greens
Last election	Did not exist	1 seat
Seats before	0	1
Seats won	1	1
Seat change	▲1	Steady
First preference vote	1,543	1,504
Percentage	9.89%	9.64%
Swing	▲9.89	▼1.26
Largest party before election
Vote 1 Growth
Subsequent largest party
Vote 1 Growth

Armidale Regional Council is composed of 9 councillors elected proportionally to a single ward.

Incumbent councillors Sam Coupland, Tom Redwood, Paul Gaddes and Jon Galletly − who were all elected as ungrouped independents in 2021 − formed their own group known as "Vote 1 Growth".

Independent councillors Steve Mepham and Paul Packham did not seek re-election.

=== Armidale results ===
2024 New South Wales local elections: Armidale
Party	Candidate	Votes	%	±%
Vote 1 Growth	1. Sam Coupland (elected); 2. Todd Redwood (elected); 3. Paul Gaddes (elected); 4. Kay Endres (elected); 5. Jane Mactier; 6. Jane Schmude; 7. Melanie Fillios; 8. Jon Galletly	7,528	48.27	+48.27
Labor	1. Susan McMichael (elected); 2. Caroline Chapman; 3. Debra O'Brien; 4. Yvonne Langenberg; 5. Lisa Ward	1,904	12.21	−3.29
Independent Regional Alliance	1. Eli Imad (elected); 2. Rob Lenehan; 3. Peter Heagney; 4. Robert Jackson; 5. Jypsi Hooper	1,543	9.89	+9.89
Greens	1. Dorothy Robinson (elected); 2. Elizabeth O'Hara; 3. Pat Schulz; 4. Gayle Davies; 5. Gay (Alice) Cairns	1,504	9.64	−1.26
Community First Independents	1. Rob Taber (elected); 2. Rob Richardson; 3. Siri Gamage; 4. Josephine Newberry; 5. Andy Berriman	1,042	6.68	+6.68
Independent	Bradley Widders (elected)	589	3.78	−0.32
Margaret O'Connor's Team	1. Margaret O'Connor; 2. Brian Flint; 3. Kerry Moran; 4. Bruce Newberry; 5. Deni McKenzie; 6. Janet Edmonds	540	3.46	−10.94
Independent	Jenny Wild	450	2.89	+2.89
Independent	Joshua Fittler	230	1.47	+1.47
Independent	Madank Narayanamurthy	180	1.15	+1.15
Independent	Natasha Ledger	85	0.55	+0.55
Total formal votes		15,595	94.36	
Informal votes		933	5.64	
Turnout		16,528		

== Glen Innes Severn ==
2024 Glen Innes Severn Council election
- 14 September 2024

All 7 seats on Glen Innes Severn Council 4 seats needed for a majority
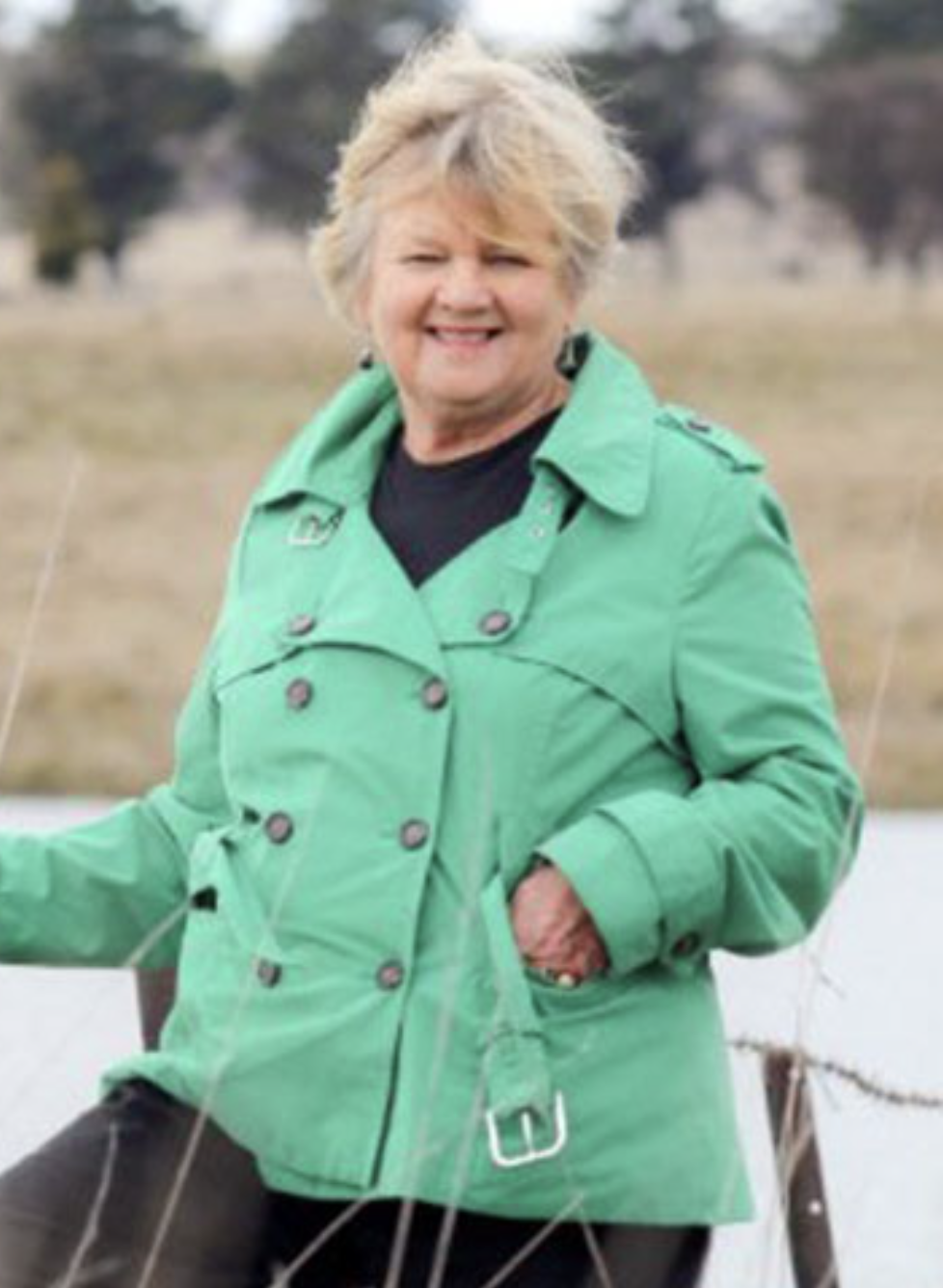
	First party	Second party	Third party
	IND	IND
Leader	N/A	N/A	Carol Sparks
Party	Independents	Ind. National	Greens
Last election	6 seats	Did not contest	1 seat
Seats before	6	0	1
Seats won	5	1	1
Seat change	▼1	▲1	Steady
First preference vote	4,302	683	559
Percentage	77.6%	12.3%	10.1%
Swing	▼10.8	▲12.3	▼1.5
Largest party before election
Independents
Subsequent largest party
Independents

Glen Innes Severn Council is composed of seven councillors elected proportionally to a single ward.

=== Glen Innes Severn results ===
2024 New South Wales local elections: Glen Innes Severn
Party	Candidate	Votes	%	±%
Independent	Rob Banham (elected 1)	1,555	28.0	+8.6
Independent	Troy Arandale (elected 2)	822	14.8	+3.2
Independent	Timothy Alt (elected 3)	760	14.7	+3.6
Greens	Carol Sparks (elected 4)	559	10.1	−1.5
Independent National	Margot Davis (elected 5)	444	8.0	+8.0
Independent	Max Elphick (elected 6)	400	7.2	+7.2
Independent	Andrew Parsons (elected 7)	352	6.3	+0.6
Independent	Anne Vosper	251	4.5	+4.5
Independent National	David Scott	239	4.3	+4.3
Independent	Elena Weatherall	162	2.9	+2.9
Total formal votes		5,544	94.8	−2.4
Informal votes		302	5.2	+2.4
Turnout		5,846	86.5	−3.9

== Gunnedah ==
2024 Gunnedah Shire Council election
- 14 September 2024

All 9 seats on Gunnedah Shire Council 5 seats needed for a majority
	First party	Second party
	IND	IND
Party	Independents	Ind. National
Last election	4 seats	4 seats
Seats before	4	5
	Third party	Fourth party
	IND
Party	Ind. Labor	Labor
Last election	1 seat	Did not contest
Seats before	0	1
Largest party before election
Ind. National
Subsequent largest party
TBD

Gunnedah Shire Council is composed of nine councillors elected proportionally to a single ward.

Three councillors − Jamie Chaffey, Murray O'Keefe and David Moses − are not seeking re-election.

Incumbent councillor Kate McGrath is contesting as an endorsed Labor candidate, while there is also one Independent Labor candidate.

=== Gunnedah results ===
2024 New South Wales local elections: Gunnedah
Party	Candidate	Votes	%	±%
Independent	Colleen Fuller (elected)	2,375	32.6	+5.7
Independent	Tammey McAllan (elected)	830	11.4	
Independent Labor	Linda Newell (elected)	739	10.1	
Independent National	Robert (Rob) Hooke (elected)	692	9.5	+6.2
Independent National	Robert Hoddle (elected)	529	7.3	+4.0
Labor	Kate McGrath (elected)	509	7.0	−1.0
Independent	Ann Luke (elected)	472	6.5	+1.9
Independent National	Juliana McArthur (elected)	396	5.4	+0.7
Independent	Mitchum Neave	369	5.1	
Independent	Cameron Moore (elected)	219	3.0	
Independent	Greg Petersen	166	2.3	
Total formal votes		7,296	92.8	
Informal votes		568	7.2	
Turnout		7,864	83.6	

== Gwydir ==
=== Gwydir results ===
2024 New South Wales local elections: Gwydir
Party	Candidate	Votes	%	±%
Independent	Tiffany Galvin (elected)	503	16.9	+1.6
Independent	1. Ravi Gill; 2. Adrian Willmot (elected)	428	14.4	
Independent	Sarah Crump (elected)	331	11.1	
Independent National	Mick Collins (elected)	316	10.6	
Independent	Sean Coleman (elected)	242	8.1	
Independent	Rachel Sherman (elected)	229	7.7	
Independent	John Bishton (elected)	206	6.9	
Independent	Marilyn (Mashy) Dixon (elected)	165	5.5	−4.5
Independent	Scot Crispin (elected)	156	5.2	
Independent	Lyndon Mulligan	140	4.7	−3.6
Independent	Stuart Dick	119	4.0	
Independent	Allan Reddan	100	3.4	
Independent	Sally-Anne Robertson	45	1.5	
Total formal votes		2,980	93.3	
Informal votes		214	6.7	
Turnout		3,194	82.9	

== Inverell ==
=== Inverell results ===
2024 New South Wales local elections: Inverell
Party	Candidate	Votes	%	±%
Independent	1. Kate Dight (elected); 2. Ian Hooker (elected)	2,551	25.66	
Independent	1. Paul Harmon (Ind. Nat) (elected); 2. John (Jacko) Ross (elected)	2,372	23.86	
Independent	Greg Kachel (elected)	1,723	17.33	
Independent	1. Jo Williams (elected); 2. Fiona Brown (elected)	1,350	13.58	
Independent	1. Paul King (elected); 2. Wendy Wilks (Ind. Nat) (elected)	1,280	12.88	
Independent	Kelvin Brown	396	3.98	
Independent National	Graem Murray	268	2.70	
Total formal votes		9,940	90.69	
Informal votes		1,021	9.31	
Turnout		10,961	82.99	

== Liverpool Plains ==
2024 Liverpool Plains Shire Council election
- 14 September 2024

All 7 seats on Liverpool Plains Shire Council 4 seats needed for a majority
	First party	Second party
	IND	IND
Party	Independents	Ind. National
Last election	6 seats	1 seat
Seats before	6	1
Largest party before election
Independents
Subsequent largest party
TBD

Liverpool Plains Shire Council is composed of seven councillors elected proportionally to a single ward.

=== Liverpool Plains results ===
2024 New South Wales local elections: Liverpool Plains
Party	Candidate	Votes	%	±%
Independent	Shawn Cain (elected)	1,239	26.9	
Independent	Charlie Simkin (elected)	577	12.5	
Independent	Kenneth Cudmore (elected)	506	11.0	−1.0
Independent	Terry Cohen (elected)	386	8.4	−4.5
Independent National	Doug Hawkins	333	7.2	−6.9
Independent	Jason Allan (elected)	326	7.1	−7.9
Independent	James Robertson (elected)	312	6.8	+3.8
Independent	Donna Lawson (elected)	304	6.6	−15.2
Independent	Lynn Eykamp	230	5.0	
Independent	Ebonie Sadler-Small	150	3.3	
Independent	Theodore Maczi	115	2.5	
Independent	Yvonne Wynne	136	3.0	−1.0
Total formal votes		4,614	94.2	
Informal votes		284	5.8	
Turnout		4,898	82.7	

== Moree Plains ==
=== Moree Plains results ===
2024 New South Wales local elections: Moree Plains
Party	Candidate	Votes	%	±%
Independent	1. Susannah Pearse (Ind. Nat) (elected); 2. Brooke Sauer (elected)	1,610	27.73	
Independent	Wayne Tighe (elected)	844	14.54	
Independent Liberal	Kelly James (elected)	578	9.96	
Independent	Pete Mailler (elected)	506	8.72	
Independent	Dominique Hodgkinson (elected)	429	7.39	
Independent	Frederick McGrady (elected)	271	4.67	
Independent National	Debra Williams (elected)	229	3.94	
Independent	Kerry Cassells (elected)	215	3.70	
Independent	Karen Munn	208	3.58	
Independent	Stephen Ritchie	203	3.50	
Independent	Mekayla Cochrane	198	3.41	
Independent	Michael Ivanov	189	3.26	
Independent Labor	Meryl Dillon	175	3.01	
Independent Labor	Liz Taylor	151	2.60	
Total formal votes		5,806		
Informal votes		552		
Turnout		6,358		

== Narrabri ==
=== Narrabri results ===
2024 New South Wales local elections: Narrabri
Party	Candidate	Votes	%	±%
Independent	1. Darrell Tiemens (elected); 2. Amanda Brown (elected); 3. Mark Strahle; 4. Peter Harvey (Ind. Science); 5. Karen Kirkby	1,775	23.9	+15.7
Independent	1. Brett Nolan (elected); 2. Jocellin Jansson (Ind. Nat) (elected); 3. Matthew Nolan; 4. Kodey Stanford; 5. Kat Denniss	1,415	19.1	
Independent	1. Ethan Towns (elected); 2. Andrew Dewson; 3. Roxanne Whitton; 4. Ryan Whillas; 5. Bernadette Melton	1,175	15.8	
Independent Labor	1. Joshua Roberts-Garnsey (elected); 2. Emma Alexanderson; 3. Rohan Boehm (Ind.); 4. Ian Duffey; 5. Robert Browning (Ind.)	721	9.7	
Independent	1. Gregory Lamont (elected); 2. James (Jock) Duncan; 3. Jennifer Wilson; 4. Marilyn Binge; 5. John Carrigan	594	8.0	−17.8
Independent	Navin Erathnage (elected)	368	5.0	
Independent	Peter Guest	362	4.9	
Independent	1. Ian Passmore; 2. Lloyd Bennett; 3. Damian Oudenryn; 4. Mark Crutcher; 5. Kent Ferguson	259	3.5	
Independent	Brett Dickinson (elected)	207	2.8	−2.2
Independent	Ken Flower	170	2.3	
Independent	Catherine Redding	157	2.1	−3.0
Independent	Colin Armstrong	145	2.0	
Independent	Glen Stoltenberg	67	0.9	
Independent	Matthew Bullock	10	0.13	
Total formal votes		7,425		
Informal votes		421		
Turnout		7,846		

== Tamworth ==
2024 Tamworth Regional Council election
- 14 September 2024

All 9 seats on Tamworth Regional Council 5 seats needed for a majority

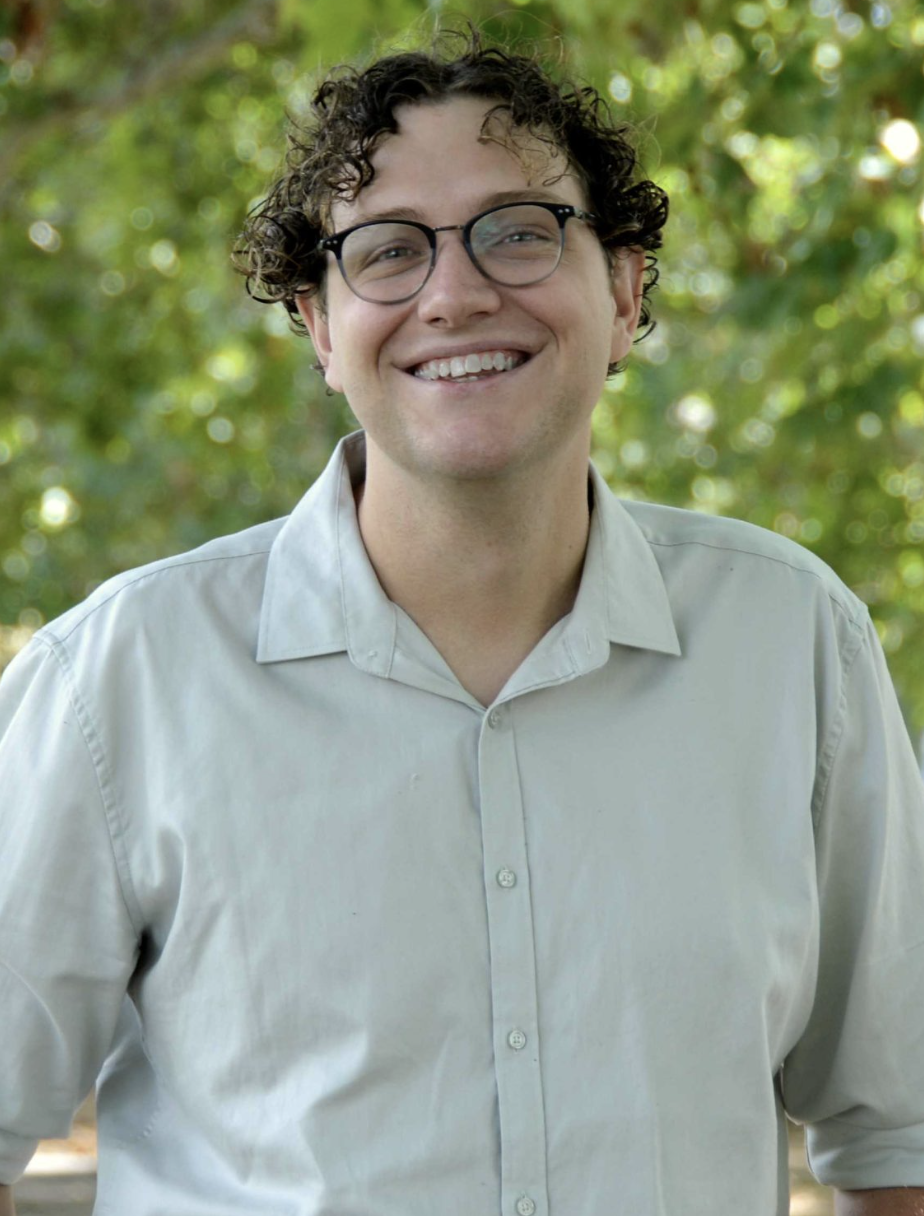
	First party	Second party
	IND
Leader	N/A	Stephen Mears
Party	Independents	Labor
Last election	7 seats	1 seat
Seats before	7	1
Seats won	7	1
Seat change	Steady	Steady
First preference vote	24,397	6,680
Percentage	65.7	18.0
Swing	▼8.9	▲4.4
	Third party	Fourth party
		IND
Leader	Ryan Brooke	N/A
Party	Greens	Ind. National
Last election	Did not contest	1 seat
Seats before	0	1
Seats won	1	0
Seat change	▲1	▼1
First preference vote	3,183	2,893
Percentage	8.6	7.7
Swing	▲8.6	▼4.1
Largest party before election
Independents
Subsequent largest party
Independents

Tamworth Regional Council is composed of nine councillors elected proportionally to a single ward.

Labor was the only party to contest the 2021 election with an above-the-line group, with ungrouped candidates winning 86.4% of the vote.

=== Tamworth results ===
2024 New South Wales local elections: Tamworth
Party	Candidate	Votes	%	±%
Independent	Mark Rodda (elected 1)	9,523	25.6	+7.9
Labor	1. Stephen Mears (elected 2); 2. Laura Hughes; 3. Thomas Robinson; 4. Denise McHugh; 5. Sergio Rindo	6,680	18.0	+4.4
Greens	1. Ryan Brooke (elected 9); 2. Gemma-Lea Tolmie; 3. Sewa Emojong; 4. Robin Gunning; 5. Catherine Fogarty	3,183	8.6	+8.6
Independent	Russell Webb (elected 4)	2,500	6.7	−4.1
Independent	Brendon North (elected 3)	2,246	6.0	+6.0
Independent	Jeffrey Budd (elected 5)	2,039	5.5	+5,5
Independent	Marc Sutherland (elected 8)	1,714	4.6	−5.6
Independent	Charles Impey (elected 7)	1,611	4.3	+0.8
Independent	Matt Sharpam (elected 6)	1,582	4.3	+4.3
Independent National	Bede Burke	1,573	4.2	−7.6
Independent	Judy Coates	1,474	4.0	+0.7
Independent	Ray Tait	808	2.2	−1.0
Independent National	Heidi Williamson	754	2.0	+2.0
Independent	Marie Fenn	582	1.6	+1.6
Independent National	Daniel Gillett	566	1.5	+1.5
Independent	Greg Meyer	318	0.9	+0.9
Total formal votes		37,153	92.8	+0.5
Informal votes		2,887	7.2	−0.5
Turnout		40,040	86.0	+0.1

== Tenterfield ==
=== Tenterfield results ===
2024 New South Wales local elections: Tenterfield
Party	Votes	%	Swing	Seats	Change
Independents	2,085	70.78		7	
Independent National	861	29.22		2	
Independent United Australia	0	0.00	+0.00	1	▲1
Formal votes	2,946	95.87			
Informal votes	127	4.13			
Total	3,073	100.0			
Registered voters / turnout					

=== A Ward ===
2024 New South Wales local elections: A Ward
Party	Candidate	Votes	%	±%
Independent	Tim Bonner (elected)	408	57.63	
Independent	Gregory Purcell (elected)	164	23.16	
Independent	Ben Raymond	136	19.21	
Total formal votes		708		
Informal votes		42		
Turnout		750		

=== B Ward ===
2024 New South Wales local elections: B Ward
Party	Candidate	Votes	%	±%
Independent	Bronwyn Petrie (elected)	unopposed		
Ind. United Australia	Robert Turner (elected)	unopposed		
Registered electors		1,031		

=== C Ward ===
2024 New South Wales local elections: C Ward
Party	Candidate	Votes	%	±%
Independent National	Peter Petty (elected)	259	38.95	
Independent	Peter Murphy (elected)	232	34.89	
Independent National	Joshua Moylan	174	26.17	
Total formal votes		665		
Informal votes		33		
Turnout		698		

=== D Ward ===
2024 New South Wales local elections: D Ward
Party	Candidate	Votes	%	±%
Independent	Owen Bancroft (elected)	303	37.83	
Independent National	Kim Rhodes (elected)	302	37.70	
Independent	Josh Macnish	120	14.98	
Independent	Allen Crosthwaite	76	9.49	
Total formal votes		801		
Informal votes		25		
Turnout		826		

=== E Ward ===
2024 New South Wales local elections: E Ward
Party	Candidate	Votes	%	±%
Independent	Greg Sauer (elected)	522	67.62	
Independent National	Matthew Sing	126	16.32	
Independent	Thomas Peters (elected)	124	16.06	
Total formal votes		772		
Informal votes		27		
Turnout		799		

== Uralla ==
2024 Uralla Shire Council election
- 14 September 2024

All 8 seats on Uralla Shire Council (Note: Excluding the mayor, who is directly-elected.) 5 seats needed for a majority
- Turnout: 0.00%
	First party
	IND
Party	Independents
Last election	8 seats
Seats before	8
Seats won	8
Seat change	Steady
First preference vote	Unopposed
Largest party before election
Independents
Subsequent largest party
Independents

Uralla Shire Council is composed of two wards, each electing four councillors, as well as a directly elected mayor. The entire election (including the mayoral election) was uncontested.

Two referendums went ahead − one asking about the removal of the direct mayoral election, and another asking about the removal of the wards. Voters chose not to remove the mayoral election, but supported the removal of wards, and Uralla will be an undivided council at the 2028 election.

=== Uralla results ===
2024 New South Wales local elections: Uralla
Party	Votes	%	Swing	Seats	Change
Independents	0	0.0	−100.0	8	Steady
Total	0	0.0		8	
Registered voters / turnout	4,699	0.0			

=== A Ward ===
2024 New South Wales local elections: A Ward
Party	Candidate	Votes	%	±%
Independent	Adam Blakester (elected)	unopposed		
Independent	David Mailler (elected)	unopposed		
Independent	Tom O'Connor (elected)	unopposed		
Independent	Lone Petrov (elected)	unopposed		
Registered electors		2,283		

=== B Ward ===
2024 New South Wales local elections: B Ward
Party	Candidate	Votes	%	±%
Independent	Kathrine Arnold (elected)	unopposed		
Independent	Sarah Burrows (elected)	unopposed		
Independent	Leanne Doran (elected)	unopposed		
Independent	Jen Philp (elected)	unopposed		
Registered electors		2,416		

== Walcha ==
=== Walcha results ===
2024 New South Wales local elections: Walcha
Party	Candidate	Votes	%	±%
Independent	Eric Noakes (elected)	806	42.62	
Independent	Rachel Greig (elected)	225	11.90	
Independent	Hyde Thomson (elected)	167	8.83	
Independent	Gary Olrich (elected)	160	8.46	
Independent National	Glen O'Brien (elected)	122	6.45	
Independent	Stephen McCoy (elected)	107	5.66	
Independent	Adam Iuston (elected)	75	3.97	
Independent	Anne-Marie Pointing (elected)	71	3.75	
Independent	Holly Fletcher	42	2.22	
Independent	Michael Luchich	42	2.22	
Independent	Katrina Blomfield	34	1.80	
Independent	Warwick Fletcher	31	1.64	
Independent	Judith Salter	9	0.48	
Total formal votes		1,891	97.23	
Informal votes		54	2.77	
Turnout		1,945	83.76	
