= Results of the 2021 New South Wales local elections in New England =

This is a list of results for the 2021 New South Wales local elections in the New England region, including the North West.

== Armidale ==
Armidale Regional Council is composed of 11 councillors elected proportionally to a single ward.

=== Armidale results ===
2021 New South Wales local elections: Armidale
Party	Candidate	Votes	%	±%
Labor	1. Debra O'Brien (elected); 2. Susan McMichael (elected); 3. Caroline Chapman; 4. Yvonne Langenberg; 5. April Youngberry; 6. Margaret Finley	2,352	15.5	+4.5
Team Margaret and Gordon	1. Margaret O'Connor (Ind. Lib) (elected); 2. Gordon Cope; 3. Bruce Newberry; 4. Janet Edmonds; 5. Ju Denton; 6. Trevor Esplin	2,196	14.4	+3.1
Independent	Sam Coupland (elected)	1,897	12.5	
Greens	1. Dorothy Robinson (elected); 2. Elizabeth O'Hara; 3. Gaynor McGrath; 4. Richard Sheridan; 5. Pat Schultz; 6. Dora Koops	1,664	10.9	+3.4
Independent	Jon Galletly (elected)	1,139	7.5	
Independent	Steven Mepham (elected)	930	6.1	
Independent	Todd Redwood (elected)	852	5.6	
Independent	Paul Packham (elected)	728	4.8	
Independent	Bradley Widders (elected)	627	4.1	
Independent	Paul Gaddes (elected)	621	4.1	
Independent	Richard Robinson	598	3.9	
Independent	Callan Schaefer	466	3.1	
Independent	Kathleen Clare	416	2.7	
Independent	Peter Bailey	239	1.6	
Independent	Margaret Sims	224	1.5	
Independent	Phillip Blackmore	158	1.0	
Independent	Craig Pevitt	116	0.8	
Total formal votes		28,374	94.2	
Informal votes		1,745	5.8	
Turnout			80.0	
Party total seats			Seats	±
Independent			7	▼1
Labor			2	▲1
Independent Liberal			1	Steady
Greens			1	Steady

== Glen Innes Severn ==
2021 Glen Innes Severn Council election
← 2016	4 December 2021	2024 →

All 7 seats on Glen Innes Severn Council 4 seats needed for a majority
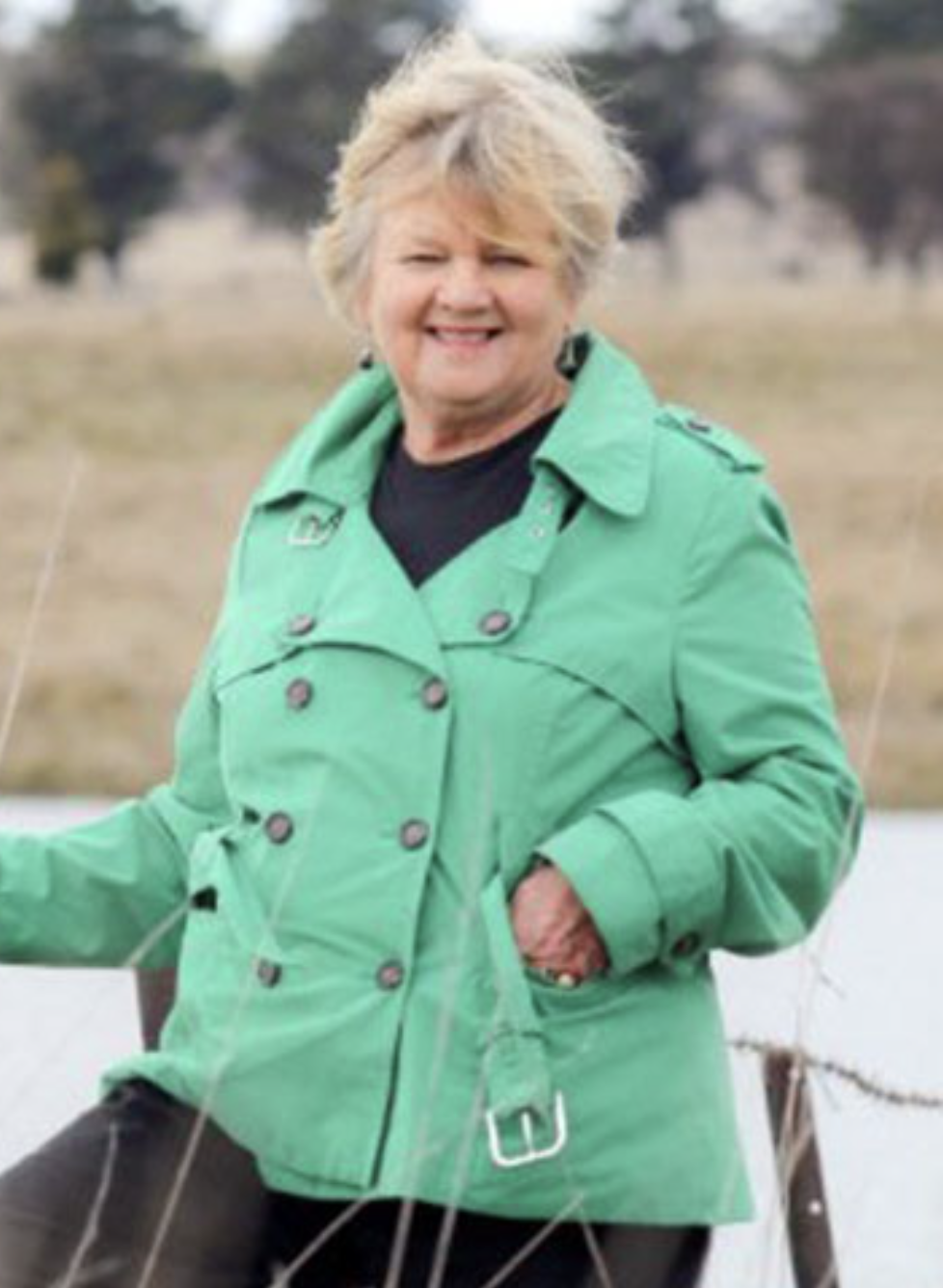
	First party	Second party
	IND
Leader	N/A	Carol Sparks
Party	Independents	Greens
Last election	6 seats	1 seat
Seats before	6	1
Seats won	6	1
Seat change	Steady	Steady
First preference vote	4,858	638
Percentage	88.4%	11.6%
Swing	▼2.7	▲2.7
Largest party before election
Independents
Subsequent largest party
Independents

Glen Innes Severn Council is composed of seven councillors elected proportionally to a single ward.

=== Glen Innes Severn results ===
2021 New South Wales local elections: Glen Innes Severn
Party	Candidate	Votes	%	±%
Independent	Rob Banham (elected)	1,066	19.4	
Greens	Carol Sparks (elected)	638	11.6	+2.7
Independent	Troy Arandale (elected)	637	11.6	
Independent	Timothy Alt (elected)	612	11.1	
Independent	Jack Parry (elected)	534	9.7	
Independent	Lara Gresham (elected)	389	7.1	
Independent	Andrew Parsons (elected)	311	5.7	
Independent	Jeff Smith	298	5.4	
Independent	Benjamin Thorpe	223	4.1	
Independent	Richard Moon	207	3.8	
Independent	Dianne Newman	177	3.2	
Independent	Sheryn Nourse	177	3.2	
Independent	Rosemary Curtis	173	3.1	
Independent	David Renn	54	1.0	
Total formal votes		5,496	97.2	
Informal votes		161	2.8	
Turnout		5,657	90.4	

== Gunnedah ==
2021 Gunnedah Shire Council election
← 2017	4 December 2021	2024 →

All 9 seats on Gunnedah Shire Council 5 seats needed for a majority
	First party	Second party	Third party
	IND	IND	IND
Party	Independents	Ind. National	Ind. Labor
Seats won	4	4	1
First preference vote	5,237	1,354	573
Percentage	73.1%	18.9%	8.0%
Subsequent largest party
No overall control

Gunnedah Shire Council is composed of nine councillors elected proportionally to a single ward.

=== Gunnedah results ===
2021 New South Wales local elections: Gunnedah
Party	Candidate	Votes	%	±%
Independent	Jamie Chaffey (elected)	2,041	28.5	
Independent	Colleen Fuller (elected)	1,926	26.9	
Independent Labor	Kate McGrath (elected)	573	8.0	
Independent National	Murray O'Keefe (elected)	551	7.7	
Independent	David Moses (elected)	434	6.1	
Independent National	Juliana McArthur (elected)	334	4.7	
Independent	Ann Luke (elected)	330	4.4	
Independent National	Robert Hoddle (elected)	235	3.3	
Independent National	Robert Hooke (elected)	234	3.3	
Independent	Peter Wills	227	3.2	
Independent	Michael Silver	188	2.6	
Independent	Wendy Eriksen	91	1.3	
Total formal votes		7,164	95.9	
Informal votes		309	4.1	
Turnout		7,473	82.5	

== Gwydir ==
2021 New South Wales local elections: Gwydir
Party	Candidate	Votes	%	±%
Independent National	John Coulton (elected)	617	21.0	
Independent	Tiffany Galvin (elected)	449	15.3	
Independent	Chris Matthews (elected)	381	13.0	
Independent	Marilyn Dixon (elected)	293	10.0	
Independent	David Coulton (elected)	262	8.9	
Independent	Lyndon Mulligan (elected)	245	8.3	
Independent	Jim (Curly) Moore (elected)	236	8.0	
Independent	Catherine Egan (elected)	200	6.8	
Independent	Geoffrey Smith (elected)	173	5.9	
Independent	Frances Young	84	2.9	
Total formal votes		2,940	95.7	
Informal votes		133	4.3	
Turnout		3,073	81.5	
Party total votes
Independent		2,323	79.0	
Independent National		617	21.0	

== Inverell ==
2021 New South Wales local elections: Inverell
Party	Candidate	Votes	%	±%
Independent	1. Paul Harmon (elected); 2. Kate Dight (elected)	3,271	33.1	
Di Baker & Jo Williams	1. Di Baker (elected); 2. Jo Williams (elected)	2,947	29.8	
Independent	1. Paul King (elected); 2. Wendy Wilks (elected)	1,264	12.8	
Independent	Nicky Lavender (elected)	665	6.7	
Independent	Stewart Berryman (elected)	592	6.0	
Independent	John (Jacko) Ross (elected)	481	4.9	
Independent	Phil Girle	347	3.5	
Independent	Jacki Watts	320	3.2	
Total formal votes		9,887	93.3	
Informal votes		705	6.7	
Turnout		10,592	82.3	

== Liverpool Plains ==
2021 Liverpool Plains Shire Council election
← 2017	4 December 2021	2024 →

All 7 seats on Liverpool Plains Shire Council 4 seats needed for a majority
	First party	Second party
	IND	IND
Party	Independents	Ind. National
Last election	6 seats	1 seat
Seats before	6	1
Seats won	6	1
Seat change	Steady	Steady
First preference vote	3,831	629
Percentage	85.9%	14.1%
Largest party before election
Independents
Subsequent largest party
Independents

Liverpool Plains Shire Council is composed of seven councillors elected proportionally to a single ward.

=== Liverpool Plains results ===
2021 New South Wales local elections: Liverpool Plains
Party	Candidate	Votes	%	±%
Independent	Donna Lawson (elected)	973	21.8	
Independent	Jason Allan (elected)	668	15.0	
Independent National	Doug Hawkins (elected)	629	14.1	
Independent	Terry Cohen (elected)	577	12.9	
Independent	Ken Cudmore (elected)	537	12.0	
Independent	Paul Moules (elected)	273	6.1	
Independent	Ian Lobsey	235	5.3	
Independent	Yvonne Wynne (elected)	178	4.0	
Independent	Anthony Jackson	171	3.8	
Independent	James Robertson	135	3.0	
Independent	Mark Guthrie	84	1.9	
Total formal votes		4,460	94.6	
Informal votes		256	5.4	
Turnout		4,716	82.6	

== Moree Plains ==
2021 New South Wales local elections: Moree Plains
Party	Candidate	Votes	%	±%
Independent	1. Mark Johnson (elected); 2. Lisa Orchin (elected)	1,759	30.4	
Independent	1. Susannah Pearse (elected); 2. Brooke Sauer (elected)	876	15.1	
Independent	1. Greg Smith (elected); 2. Murray Hartin (elected)	798	13.8	
Independent	1. Stephen Ritchie; 2. Kerry Cassells; 3. Noel Dean	531	9.2	
Independent	Kelly James (elected)	446	7.7	
Independent	Mike Montgomery (elected)	444	7.7	
Independent	Mekayla Cochrane (elected)	299	5.2	
Independent	Glen Crump	182	3.1	
Independent	George Chiu	162	2.8	
Independent	Stephen Garrett	150	2.6	
Independent	Michael Ivanov	142	2.5	
Total formal votes		5,789	95.2	
Informal votes		289	4.8	
Turnout		6,078	73.5	
