= Boggabri =

- Town
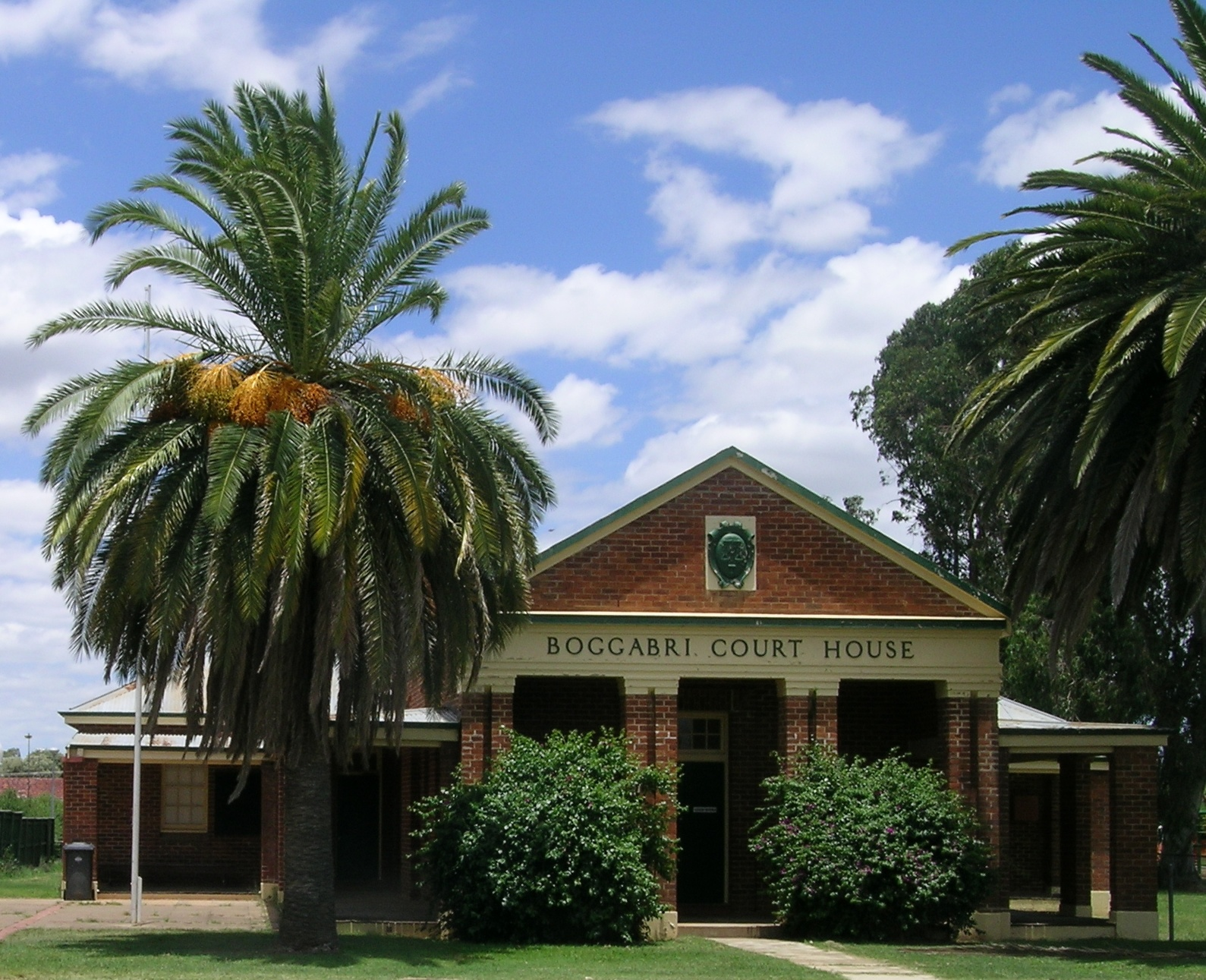
- Court House

- Coordinates: 30°42′S 150°02′E
- Country: Australia
- State: New South Wales
- LGAs: Narrabri Shire; Gunnedah Shire
- Location: 39 km (24 mi) NW of Gunnedah; 58 km (36 mi) SSE of Narrabri; 468 km (291 mi) NNW of Sydney
- Established: 1850s

Government
  - State electorate: Barwon
  - Federal division: New England, Parkes
- Elevation: 251 m (823 ft)

Population
  - Total: 885 (2021 census)
- Postcode: 2382
- County: Pottinger

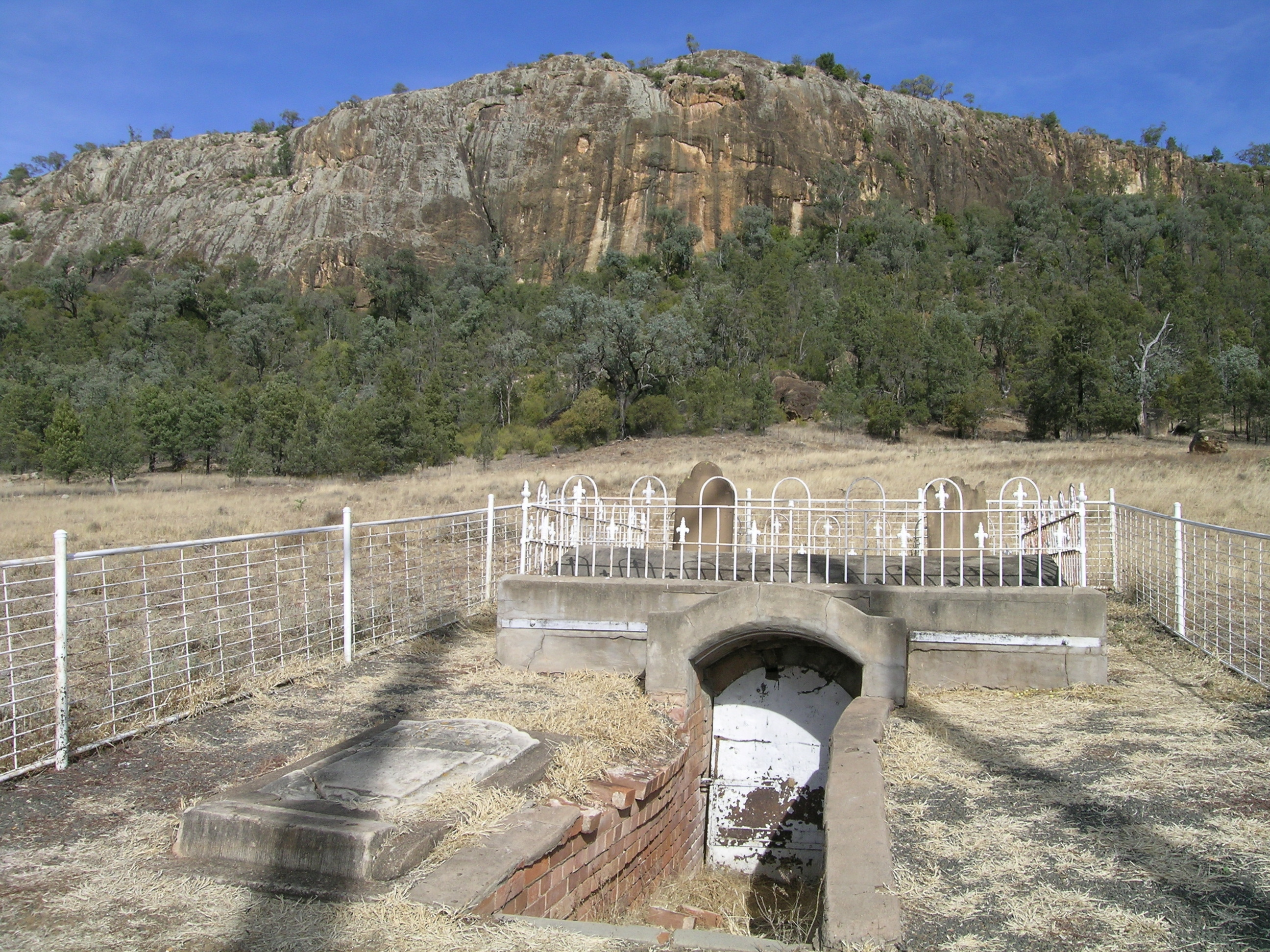
Gin's Leap, Kamilaroi Highway, Boggabri, NSW

Boggabri (/ˈbɒɡəbraɪ/ BOG-ə-bry) is a small town in north-eastern New South Wales, Australia. It is part of Narrabri Shire and lies between Gunnedah and Narrabri on the Kamilaroi Highway. At the 2021 census, the town had a population of 885.

== History ==
The original town site was 20 km (12 mi) south and settled in the 1830s but was relocated after a flood washed it away in the 1850s. Boggabri comes from Gamilaraay bagaaybaraay, literally "having creeks". It is likely a reference to the Namoi River, which passes through Boggabri.

It was officially proclaimed a town in 1862; being named after an Aboriginal Chief.

== Attractions ==
Boggabri's main tourist attraction is Gin's Leap. Its name derives from the story of an Aboriginal girl who was promised to an elder of her tribe, the Kamilaroi, and ran away with a young man from a neighbouring tribe. The couple were pursued and, seeing no escape, jumped from the cliff to their deaths.

Dripping Rock is another natural attraction featuring water that seeps through sedimentary rock and drips down a 50 m (160 ft) high wall. The water cascades down into a rock pool below after good rain creating a local waterfall.

Thunder-bolts Cave is another attraction.

== Education ==
There are two primary schools in Boggabri: Boggabri Public School and Sacred Heart Primary School.

== Medical Services ==
The town is also home to the Boggabri John Prior Health Service and Prior House Frail Aged Care Home, both named after resident Dr John Prior OAM (1922–2014), who served as the community's sole doctor for half a century and is believed to be New South Wales' longest serving GP.

== Transport ==
Boggabri railway station is situated on the Mungindi line, 515 km from Sydney. The station opened in 1882 consists of a station building on a single side platform, a passing loop and small goods yard. Currently a single daily Xplorer diesel railmotor operating between Sydney and Moree serves the station.

== Notable alumni ==
The churchman Roland St John MBE and his barrister brother Edward St John QC MP were born at Boggabri when their father was Anglican rector there.

The local rugby league team is the Boggabri Kangaroos, who play in the Group 4 Rugby League. In 1946, Boggabri's rugby league club player, Trevor Eather, was selected to play for the Australian national team.

Mahla Pearlman AO (2 June 1937 – 2 December 2011) was the first woman to become chief judge of any jurisdiction within the NSW legal system. She was born at Boggabri to a local farming family, the Pearlmans. Her grandfather Abraham Pearlman had come to Boggabri as a shopkeeper, becoming a farmer in 1905 on the acquisition of the property Herzlton.

Rugby Union player Steve Devine – born in Boggabri in 1976 – later moved to New Zealand, and briefly played for the All Blacks.

== Population ==
Historical population
Year	Pop.	±%
1954	1,378	—
1961	1,256	−8.9%
1966	1,199	−4.5%
1971	1,067	−11.0%
1976	973	−8.8%
1981	1,023	+5.1%
1986	967	−5.5%
1991	958	−0.9%
1996	875	−8.7%
2001	803	−8.2%
2006	901	+12.2%
2011	866	−3.9%
2016	856	−1.2%
2021	885	+3.4%
Source: Australian Bureau of Statistics data.

According to the 2021 census of population, there were 885 people in Boggabri.

- Aboriginal and Torres Strait Islander people made up 13.2% of the population.
- 85.6% of people were born in Australia and 87.5% of people spoke only English at home.
- The most common responses for religion were Anglican 34.0%, No Religion 21.8% and Catholic 18.8%.
