= Roland St John =

Church administrator (1914–1991)

Roland Tyrwhitt St John (Note: Pronounced 'tirrit'. Roland's father's second-cousin Cmdr (later Admiral Sir) Reginald Tyrwhitt RN led a British fleet to victory in the Battle of Heligoland Bight (1914) (the first naval battle of WWI) shortly before Roland was born.) (Note: Pronounced 'sinj'n', a Norman-French name. See Debrett's Peerage: 'St John of Bletso') MBE (16 December 1914 – 3 October 1991) was Registrar of the Anglican Diocese of Brisbane from 1946 to 1974.

== Early life ==
Born at Boggabri NSW on 16 December 1914, Roland was one of eight children of the Revd Canon Frederick de Port St John, a Church of England parish priest in rural NSW, and his wife Hannah Phoebe Mabel (Pyrke). Roland's uncle was also a Church of England parish priest. Roland's younger brother was Edward St John QC MP. Their grandfather Henry St John was a pioneer of Rawdon Island NSW and a nephew of Revd Ambrose St John, who converted to Roman Catholicism with his friend and colleague Cardinal John Henry Newman. Henry St John was a great-great-grandson of the 10th Baron St John of Bletso.

Educated at Armidale High School, Roland gained the degrees of BEc (Syd) and BA (Qld) by part-time studies and was an Associate of the Australian Society of Accountants. In accounting exams in 1952, he topped Australasia in Final Auditing with a mark of 94%. After working at Bank of NSW branches in several country towns he was transferred to the Bank's head office in Sydney. At the outbreak of war in 1939, he enlisted in the University Regiment. When the war extended to the Pacific in 1941 he volunteered for the 2nd AIF and served in Irian Jaya and New Britain, reaching the rank of Captain before returning to civilian life in 1946.

== Career ==
At the age of 32 he was appointed by Archbishop Reginald Halse to be Diocesan Registrar, Brisbane, at a time when the diocese had been in a 'perilous financial position' for some years. In his history of the Church of England in Queensland Dr. K Rayner wrote:

A member of a well-known New South Wales clerical family, St John brought to his new position both a thorough knowledge of church affairs and also the financial and administrative ability of rare quality. He recognised what many businessmen on church committees had not realised, that even in its business affairs the church could not always use the same methods as commercial enterprises, because its aims were different.

"We must remember that the Church is a Church and not a business. In the long run, its success – as a Church – will depend on its spiritual strength, rather than its financial resources. If the first is healthy, there will be little difficulty about the latter."

This implied no mandate for inefficiency in managing church affairs, and the announcement in 1956 of the complete elimination of the deficiency accounts of the diocese, which totalled more than £40,000 in 1946, was a remarkable demonstration of the skillful handling of the financial affairs of the church by the registrar.

=== Building program ===
Combining his financial acumen and his strong sense of vocation he also helped initiate the diocese's ambitious building program, which included expansion of diocesan schools, rebuilding existing hostels for the aged, and building new hostels. One of these, Spiritus Symes Thorpe, an extensive facility for the aged at Toowoomba, was opened in 1961 as an outcome of his extensive negotiations with a major benefactor.

The Diocese had long wanted to extend St John's Cathedral and knew that this would be an enormous undertaking. With the Diocese's improved financial position, the 2nd stage of cathedral construction began in 1965 and was completed in 1968. St John was actively involved in fund-raising for the construction and in its design and project management.

He was also involved in the 1960s' controversy about St Martin's Hospital, in Cathedral Square, which the Church proposed to replace with a new hospital at Zillmere. The proposal was stayed by the 'Save St Martin's' movement and went to litigation. In 1975 the Supreme Court upheld the Church's decision to move the hospital. Archbishop Felix Arnott said: 'This was a very satisfactory conclusion, and was a great tribute to the efforts of our lawyers and Mr. R T St John, who was largely responsible for preparing the material'. The old building is now a church office.

=== Contributions ===
An active lay churchman, he contributed to the establishment of the Constitution of the Anglican Church of Australia (1962); represented the diocese at the Toronto Anglican Congress (1963); and was a member of the Anglican Consultative Council.

== Personal life ==
Roland married Margaret, daughter of Archdeacon Reginald Massey, in 1949. They had a happy family life with their five children: David, Paul, Philippa, Nigel, and Julian. Margaret's early death in 1972 after a long illness was a deep grief to him. At a time when his work responsibilities were at their height, he became a single parent. In 1976 he married a widow with children, Marjorie Richardson (1924-2008).

In his book of memoirs Memories at Sunset he wrote of his childhood in Uralla and recounted anecdotes about people he had met during his lifetime. But they were not an autobiography: 'They do not speak of my good fortune in having godly, impressive and understanding parents...Nor do they refer to my marriage to two wonderful women...They do not mention the many joys and occasional sorrows of bringing up a large family'. These remained personal matters.

== Death and tributes ==
He died on 3 October 1991 aged nearly 77. In a tribute, the Primate of Australia, Dr Keith Rayner, said: "The Diocese of Brisbane and the whole Australian Church owed a tremendous amount to Roland's dedicated service and the acumen with which it was carried out. When he became Registrar he inherited a very difficult administrative and financial situation in Brisbane and he achieved a remarkable amount in turning this around."
