= Emerald Hill, New South Wales =

Emerald Hill New South Wales
- Coordinates: 30°53′15″S 150°6′28″E
- Population: 137 (2021 census)
- Postcode(s): 2380
- Location: 17.6 km (11 mi) NW of Gunnedah
- LGA(s): Gunnedah Shire
- State electorate(s): Tamworth
- Federal division(s): New England

Emerald Hill is a small town in the New England region of New South Wales, Australia. It is 17.6 kilometres north-west of Gunnedah and is part of the Gunnedah Shire.

== Population ==
According to the 2021 census, there was a population of 137 people in Emerald Hill.

- Aboriginal and Torres Strait Islander people made up 3.6% of the population.
- 81% of people were born in Australia and 88.3% of people spoke only English at home.
- Of the responses concerning religious affiliation, 37.2% responded Catholic, 20.4% responded No Religion, and 13.9% responded Anglican.
