= Tambar Springs, New South Wales =

Tambar Springs New South Wales
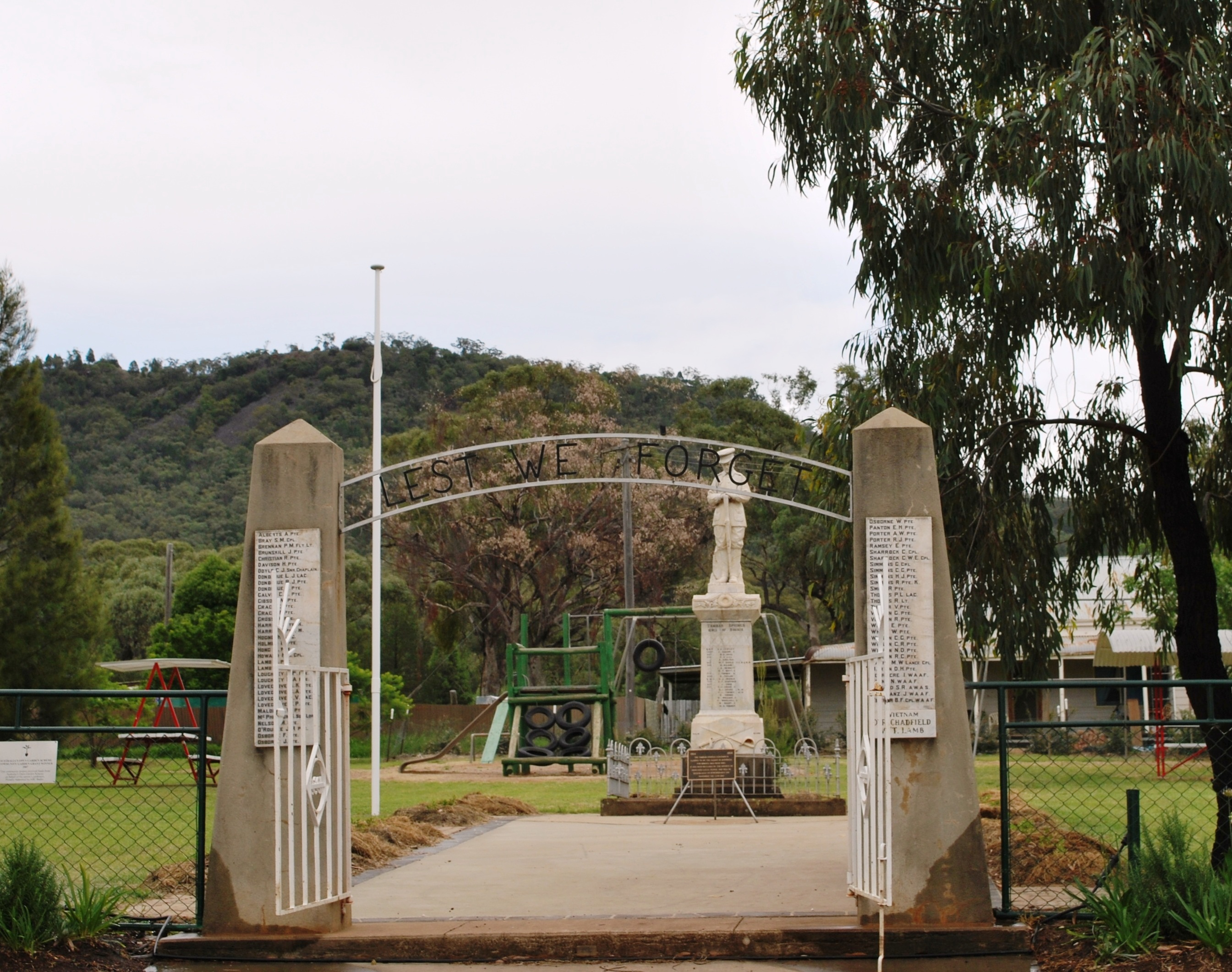
- War memorial, claimed to be the first World War I memorial in New South Wales

- Coordinates: 31°21′0″S 149°50′0″E
- Population: 187 (2016 census)
- Postcode(s): 2381
- Location: 417 km (259 mi) NW of Sydney; 67 km (42 mi) SW of Gunnedah; 57 km (35 mi) N of Coolah
- LGA(s): Gunnedah Shire Council
- State electorate(s): Tamworth
- Federal division(s): Parkes, New England

Tambar Springs is a town in the North West Slopes region of New South Wales, Australia. At the 2016 census, Tambar Springs and the surrounding area had a population of 187.

== Geography ==
The town is in the Gunnedah Shire Council local government area, 417 kilometres (259 mi) north west of the state capital, Sydney.

== History ==
Tambar Springs was opened up for grazing in the 1830s. Closer settlement began in 1868 and the village was proclaimed twenty years later in 1888.

The Tambar Springs war memorial was erected in December 1918 at a total cost of £400. It is thought to be the first World War I memorial built in New South Wales.

In addition, Tambar Springs also had the largest number of men per capita enlisted in the Australian Army, over both world wars.

== Fossils ==
Nearby Tambar Springs is a significant palaeontology site; a typical Pleistocene assemblage. Between 1979 and 1984, the Australian Museum excavated a complete Diprotodon skeleton as well as a pelvis and femur.

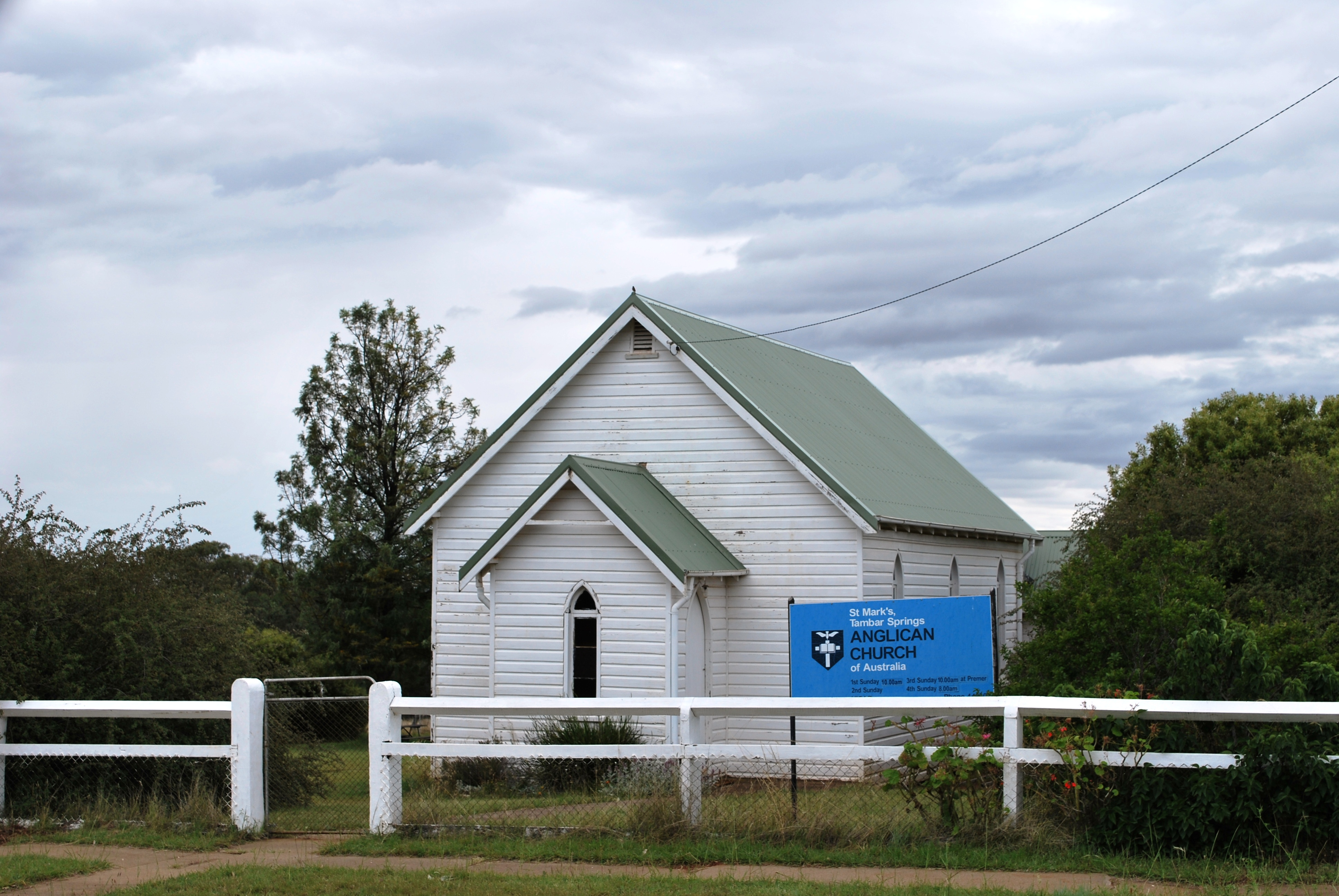
Anglican Church

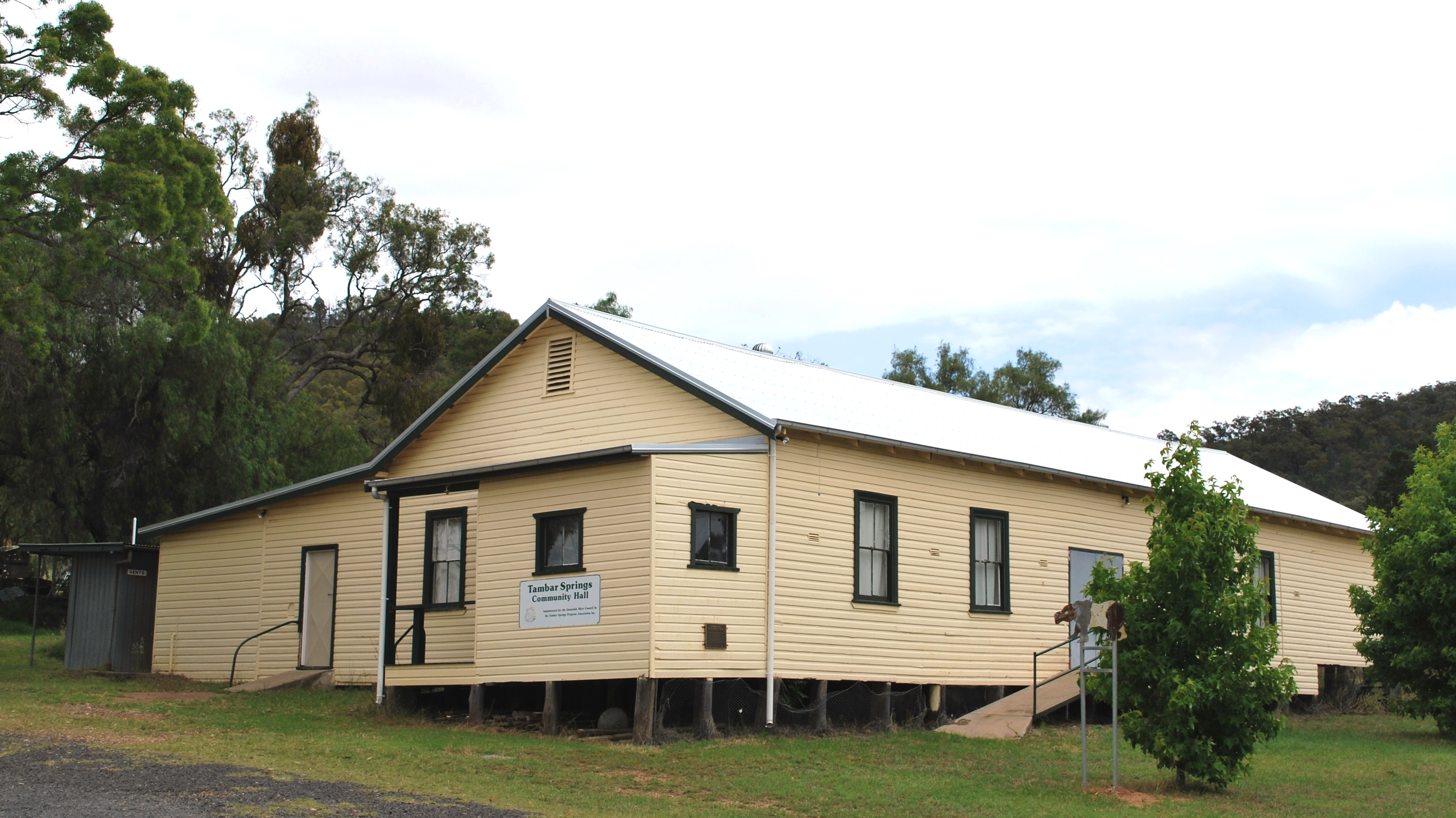
Community Hall

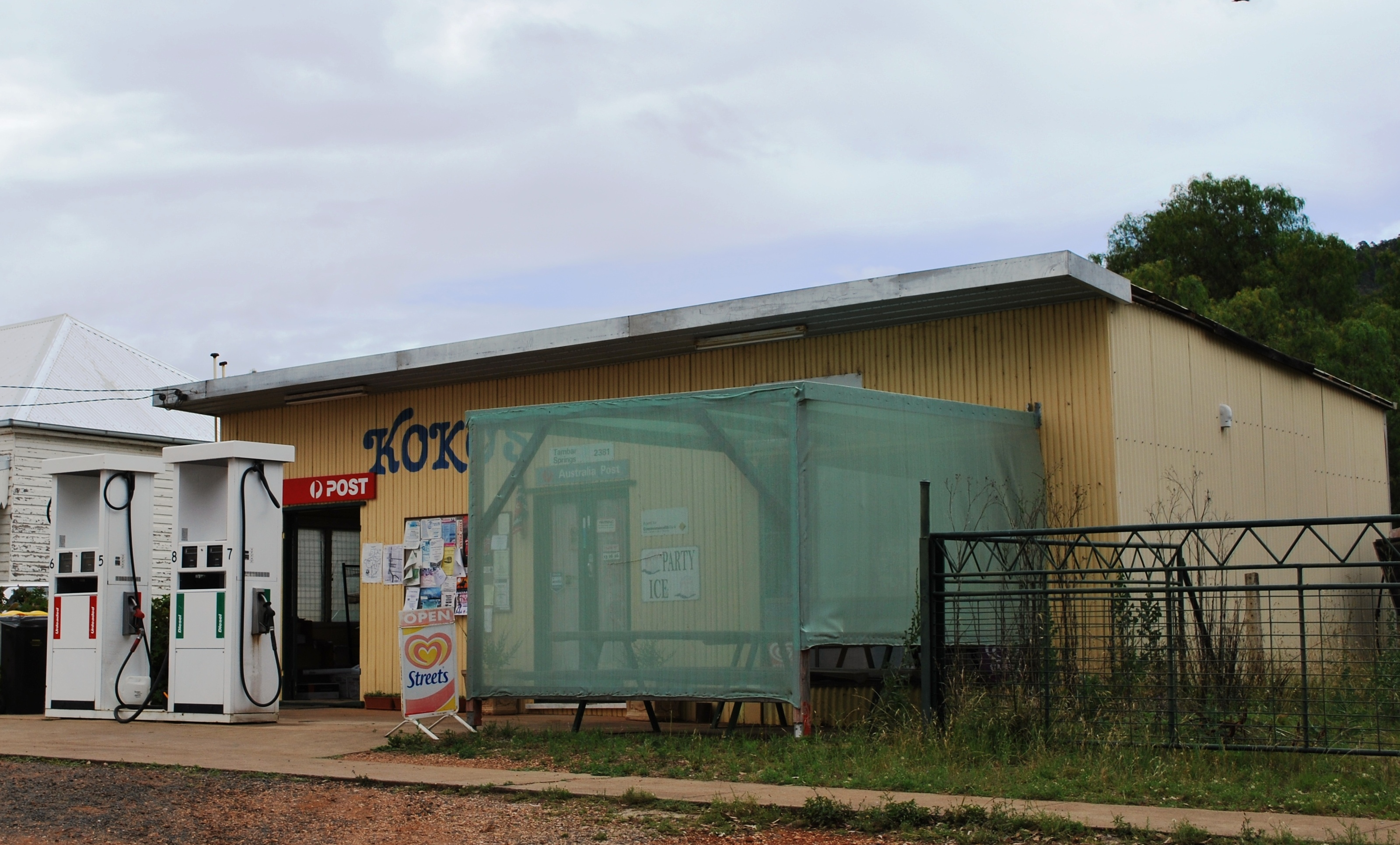
General Store

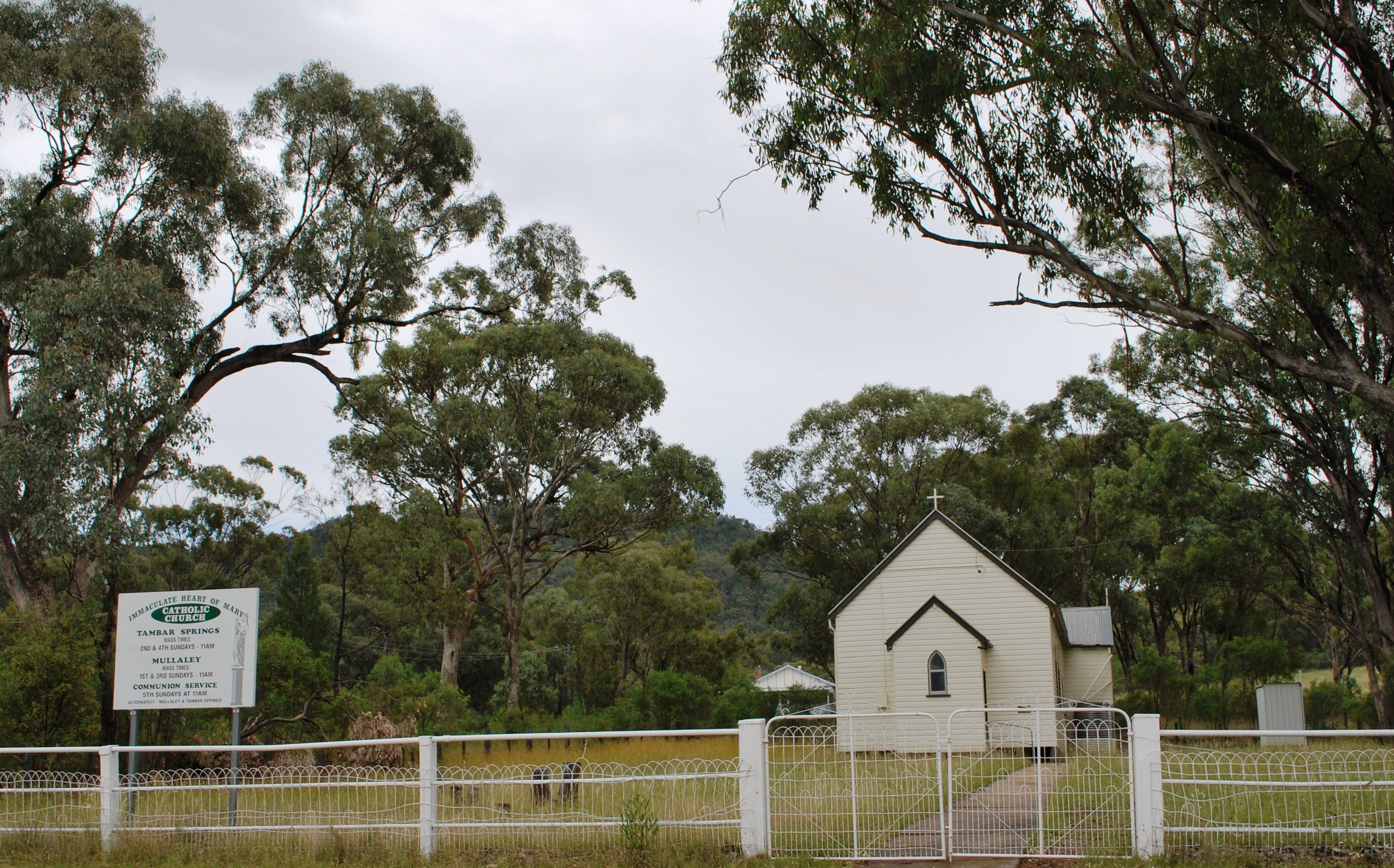
Catholic Church

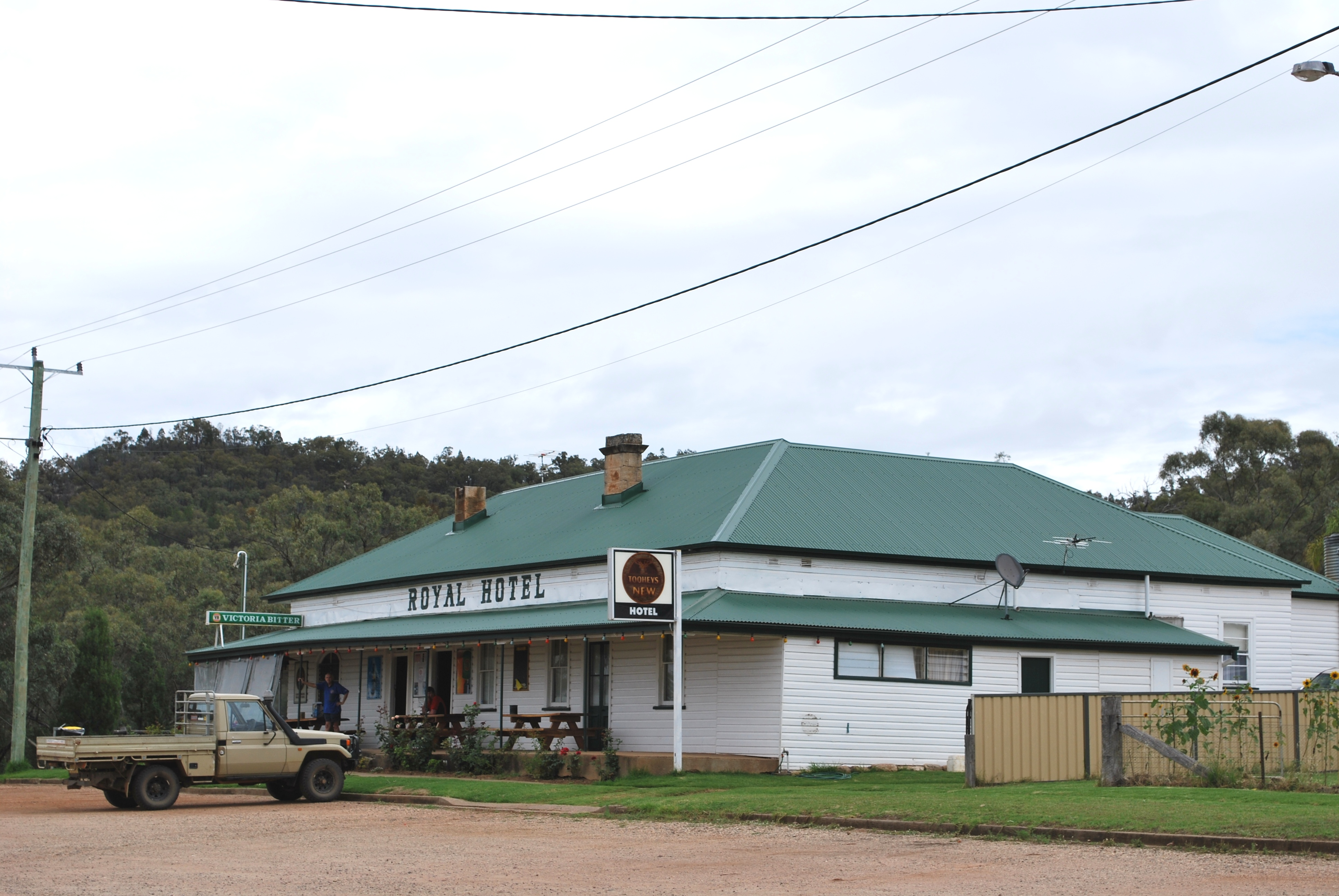
Royal Hotel
