= Institute of Public Administration Australia =

- Established: 1927
- President: Gordon de Brouwer
- Executive director, IPAA National: Frank Exon
- Address: Unit 4, 16 National Circuit, BARTON ACT 2600
- Location: Canberra, Australian Capital Territory
- Website: www.ipaa.org.au

The Institute of Public Administration Australia (IPAA) is a nonpartisan and apolitical member-based organisation which provides public sector thought leadership and works to strengthen the capacity of public servants through events, training and other activities.

IPAA was established in South Australia in 1927 and since 1984 has had divisions in each state and territory. Initially associated with the Royal Institute of Public Administration based in London, IPAA became an independent national organisation on 1 January 1980.

IPAA's strategic direction is set by a National Council – with an executive and representatives from each IPAA division – supported by a national office.

IPAA delivers an annual national conference. At the dinner preceding the conference, IPAA recognises practitioners and researchers who have made an outstanding contribution to the practice and study of public administration with the Sam Richardson Award. Members who have made outstanding contributions to public service and to IPAA are also announced as National Fellows.

IPAA membership is open to public servants, academics and those with an interest in public administration.

IPAA divisions are the engine room for local events, professional development opportunities and other member activities.

== History ==
The institute was founded in South Australia in 1927 as a regional group of the Institute of Public Administration. Regional groups were subsequently formed in each Australian state and territory: Victoria (1929), New South Wales (1935), Queensland (1951–2012; 2017), Papua and New Guinea (1952–1968), Western Australia (1944), Papua and New Guinea (1952–1968), Australian Capital Territory (1953), Tasmania (1953) and Northern Territory (1954–1968; 1984).

On 1 January 1980 ties were cut with the Royal Institute of Public Administration and a new entity came into existence: the Australian Institute of Public Administration. Over time the organisation had several name changes – Royal Australian Institute of Public Administration (1982), Royal Institute of Public Administration Australia (1991) – until eventually settling on Institute of Public Administration Australia (1996).

The first conference of the then Australian Regional Groups of the Institute of Public Administration was held in Canberra from 6–7 November 1958 with a focus on dealing with problems of recruitment in public administration in Australia. A national conference has been held every year since.

In 1959 the Australian Capital Territory Regional Group established the Garran Oration to provide a link between the memory of Sir Robert Garran and the subject of public administration. The first Garran Oration was delivered by Harry Frederick Ernest "Fred" Whitlam, a former Crown Solicitor of the Commonwealth of Australia. The Garran Oration has since become one of IPAA's richest and most public contributions to discussion and debate on public administration.

In 1982 the National Council assumed responsibility for the Garran Oration from the ACT Division. Since then the Garran Oration has been delivered by four Australian prime ministers (Hawke 1988, Howard 1997, Rudd 2009 and Gillard 2011); a former prime minister of New Zealand (Key, 2017); three state premiers (Bannon, 1986, Lawrence 1992 and Baird 2015); four Aboriginal leaders (O’Donoghue 1991, Turner 1996, Pearson 2014 and Dodson 2019); as well as a governor-general, senior government ministers and public servants; and leaders from industry, defence, the legal and medical professions and academia.

== Journal ==
The journal Public Administration was established in 1937 by Francis Bland, who served as editor in 1948. The publication was published by the New South Wales division of the IPA until the 1970s, when it was taken over by the national council and renamed the Australian Journal of Public Administration.
