= Kelvin, New South Wales =

Kelvin New South Wales
- Coordinates: 30°49′22″S 150°20′48″E
- Population: 175 (2016 census)
- Postcode(s): 2380
- Location: 20 km (12 mi) NE of Gunnedah
- LGA(s): Gunnedah Shire
- State electorate(s): Tamworth
- Federal division(s): New England

Kelvin is a locality in New South Wales, Australia. In 2016 it had a population of 175 people.
