= John Cockle =

Australian politician

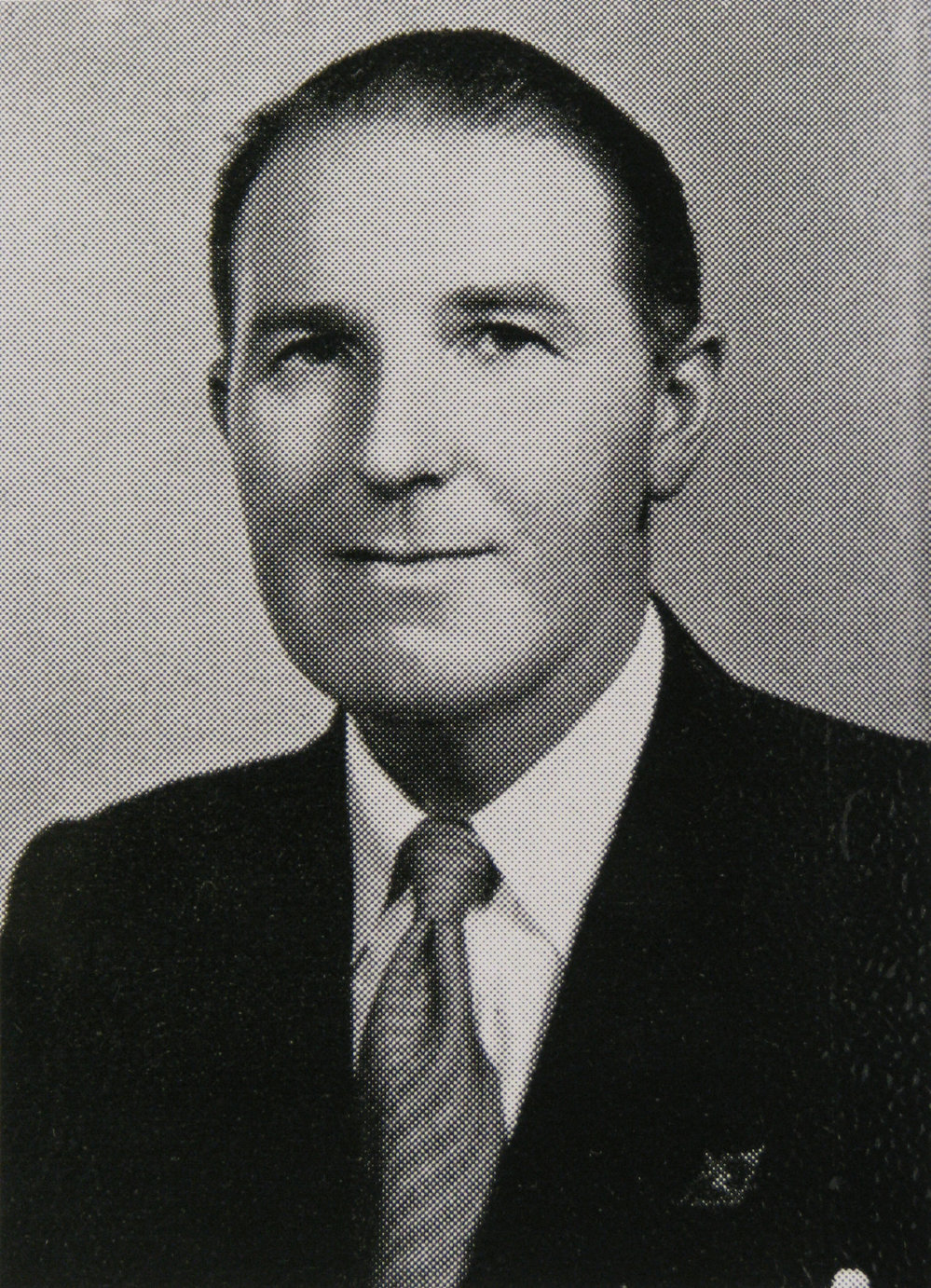

Member of the Australian Parliament for Warringah
- In office 9 December 1961 – 3 August 1966
- Preceded by: Francis Bland
- Succeeded by: Edward St John

Personal details
- Born: John Simon Cockle; 29 September 1908 Harrington, Cumbria, England
- Died: 3 August 1966 (aged 57) Mosman, New South Wales, Australia
- Party: Liberal
- Spouse: Jessie Mackay (m. 1935)
- Occupation: Manager

John Simon Cockle (29 September 1908 – 3 August 1966) was an Australian politician and businessman. He was a member of the Liberal Party and served in the House of Representatives from 1961 until his death in 1966, representing the New South Wales seat of Warringah. He had earlier served on the Sydney City Council from 1953 to 1956. Prior to entering politics he was a manager in and lobbyist for the shipping industry.

== Early life ==
Cockle was born on 29 September 1908 in Harrington, Cumberland, England. He was the son of Sarah (née Simon) and John Cockle. His father was a ship's captain originally from Liverpool.

Cockle and his family moved to Australia when he was young, settling in Coffs Harbour, New South Wales, where his father was the local manager for the North Coast Steam Navigation Company (NCSN). He was educated at Sydney Church of England Grammar School. After leaving school he joined the NCSN, working in Coffs Harbour until 1935 when he was transferred to Lismore. He was "an executive officer in numerous sporting organisations" and also served as the Coffs Harbour correspondent for The Daily Examiner.

Cockle enlisted in the Australian Imperial Force in 1942, after previous service in Militia battery units. He was initially posted to the Armoured Corps Training Regiment and later served in the Pacific with the 3rd Australian Landing Ship Detachment and the 2/2nd Australian Port Operating Company. He was discharged in 1946 with the rank of warrant officer (class II).

In 1950, Cockle was appointed secretary of the Sydney branch of the Australasian Steamship Owners' Federation (ASOF), a peak body for employers in the shipping industry. He also represented the Commonwealth Steamship Owners' Association as an advocate in Commonwealth Court of Conciliation and Arbitration proceedings and served as secretary of the Sydney branch of the Company of Master Mariners of Australia.

== Politics ==
In 1953, Cockle was elected as an alderman of the Sydney City Council, representing City Ward. He remained on the council until 1956, serving on the works committee and health and recreation committee. He was associated with the Civic Reform Association and opposed what he viewed as cronyism by the Australian Labor Party (ALP) administration of Lord Mayor Pat Hills.

Cockle was elected to the House of Representatives at the 1961 federal election, retaining the seat of Warringah for the Liberal Party. He had earlier defeated Francis Bland, the 78-year-old incumbent Liberal MP, for party preselection.

Cockle was comfortably re-elected at the 1963 election and remained in parliament until his death in office in 1966. He served on the Joint Statutory Committee on Public Accounts from 1964 to 1966. Cockle spoke frequently on maritime industry matters in parliament. In 1964 he supported calls from Don Chipp to ban Communist Party members from holding office in trade unions, attributing communists as a major source of industrial conflict. He opposed an ALP proposal for the re-establishment of a state-owned overseas shipping service to run alongside the interstate Australian National Line, and in 1966 opposed the Maritime Services Board's proposal to expand facilities at Port Jackson, instead calling for the establishment of a new port on Botany Bay.

== Personal life ==
In 1935, Cockle married Jessie Mackay, with whom he had three children. He died of a heart attack on 3 August 1966 in Mosman, New South Wales.

Parliament of Australia
Preceded by Francis Bland	Member for Warringah; 1961–1966	Succeeded by Edward St. John
