= Edward St John =

Australian politician

Edward St John QC
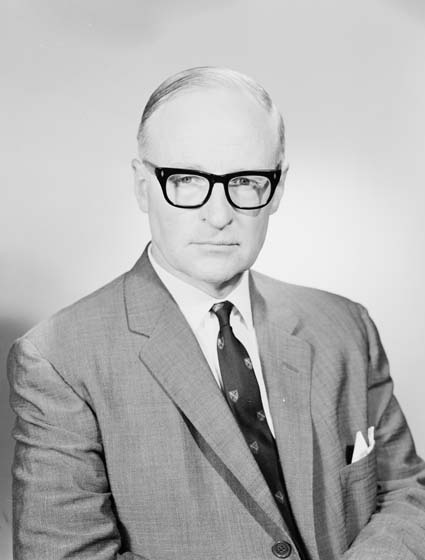

Member of the Australian Parliament for Warringah
- In office 26 November 1966 – 25 October 1969
- Preceded by: John Cockle
- Succeeded by: Michael MacKellar

Personal details
- Born: Edward Henry St John; 15 August 1916 Boggabri, New South Wales
- Died: 24 October 1994 (aged 78) Sydney
- Party: Liberal (1966–1969); Independent (1969)
- Spouse(s): Sylvette Cargher; Valerie Winslow
- Children: Madeleine St John; Colette St John; Oliver St John; Edward "Ed" St John; Patrick St John
- Occupation: Barrister

Edward Henry St John QC (/ˈsɪn.dʒən/ SIN-jən; August 1916 – 24 October 1994) was a prominent Australian barrister, anti-nuclear activist and Liberal politician in the 1960s. His political career came to a controversial end after he criticised the Prime Minister John Gorton. His book A Time to Speak was an account of his eventful three years in politics from 1966 to 1969. Justice Michael Kirby described St John as a "contradictory, restless, reforming spirit".

== Early life ==
St John was born on 15 August 1916 in Boggabri, New South Wales. He was the fifth of eight children, including Roland St John, born to Hannah Phoebe Mabel (née Pyrke) and Frederick de Porte St John. His father was an Anglican minister and the family had a history of involvement with the church, with his grandfather being a nephew of Ambrose St John.

St John's father was a vicar in country New South Wales who retired as canon of St Peter's Cathedral, Armidale. The family moved to Uralla in 1918 and then to Quirindi in 1932. St John completed his secondary education at Armidale High School and won an exhibition to attend the University of Sydney, graduating Bachelor of Arts in 1937 and Bachelor of Laws in 1940. One of his classmates was Gough Whitlam.

== Career ==
St John became a barrister in 1940 and served in the 2nd AIF in Australia, the Middle East and the New Guinea campaign between 1940 and 1945 during World War II. Upon his return he was a law lecturer at the University of Sydney. In 1959 he was an official observer at the South African Treason Trial in Pretoria. He served in 1960 as a member of the Malta Constitutional Commission. In 1966, before entering parliament, he was an acting judge of the Supreme Court on NSW. He was also President of the Australian Section of the International Commission of Jurists. In November 1966 St John was elected to the House of Representatives as the Liberal member for the safe seat of Warringah.

As a barrister, St John successfully defended Richard Walsh, editor of the satirical magazine Oz at the first Oz obscenity trial in 1964. Of his last two major cases he successfully defended Thomas and Alexander Barton, two company directors charged with a series of alleged offences in which Barton company shareholders lost millions of dollars. The prosecutor for the NSW Corporate Affairs Commission was Tom Hughes QC, a former Liberal Attorney-General. The other was a major action arising out of the Chelmsford Hospital scandal.

=== Controversies ===
St John’s maiden speech before the House of Representatives on 16 May 1967 was remarkable for not being, as is usual, a paean to the beauties of the electorate, the civic pride of its inhabitants and the aims of its new representative. Instead, he criticised, in forthright terms, the conduct and findings of the Royal Commission into the Voyager disaster, calling for a second inquiry. Even more remarkably, and against all precedent, he was interrupted by an interjection from the Prime Minister – his own party leader – Harold Holt. He had effectively sacrificed his parliamentary career, but there was a second Royal Commission, largely vindicating his stand.

He irritated the Government. In a debate on the new General Dynamics F-111 aircraft the Minister for Air, Gordon Freeth, said of St John:

From this honourable gentleman emanates an odour of sanctity in this House which is quite nauseating. He has come here fairly recently with all the benefits of his party's endorsement for one of the safest electorates in Australia, and in this comfortable security he has been quick, very quick, to cash in on every opportunity to secure for himself a headline—always available to any member who attacks his own party. He has used this regardless of the political consequences to his own less comfortably situated colleagues. He does this with an air of the highest virtue, always proclaiming his anguish, as he did last night.

On 20 March 1969, he embarrassed his party by criticising the behaviour of Prime Minister John Gorton, claiming that he had offended American ambassador Crook by turning up at 1 am at the American embassy, after a late press-gallery dinner, with journalist Geraldine Willesee, the 19-year-old daughter of Labor Senator Don Willesee. Labor Senator Lionel Murphy sent a message to the House suggesting that St John's comments were an inappropriate breach of the Prime Minister's privacy. St John's view was that Gorton was inadequate in character, training and temperament to be prime minister, and claimed that he was not the only one dissatisfied with Gorton. However, no other party members supported him. Ms Willesee issued a statutory declaration stating that she talked with Gorton on Vietnam and politics, the two were always in mixed company throughout the morning. Gorton's wife Bettina supported her husband by sending a poem to the press gallery, referring to St John as "the member with the Serpent's tongue". There were moves within the Liberal Party to expel him and remove his endorsement for the coming election. Despite maintaining the support of his local electorate conference delegates, St John resigned his endorsement to contest Warringah on 28 March 1969, and sometime in April resigned from the party to sit as an independent. He contested Warringah as an independent at the October 1969 election, but finished third on 20.62%, having lost more than half of his primary vote from 1966. His book about these turbulent times, A Time to Speak, was published just before the elections.

During his time as an MP he spoke in parliament on many matters. He spoke in support of the Vietnam war and military conscription. He urged the development of nuclear power capacity for peaceful purposes and for deterrent purposes in case of war.

After his defeat he took up an interest in mining. In 1970 he was managing director (later chairman) of prospecting company Mount Mejack Minerals Pty Ltd, and a director of its related nickel exploration company, Meekatharra Minerals NL.

== Activism ==
St John was a member of the conservative Association of Cultural Freedom and a friend of activist journalist B. A. Santamaria. Despite this conservatism, he set up the International Defence and Aid Fund for Southern Africa for victims of apartheid; and his election to parliament had been firmly opposed by the Australian League of Rights.

St John helped establish global principles of the rule of law at successive meetings of the International Commission of Jurists in Bangkok, Rio de Janeiro and New Delhi, a non-governmental international human rights organisation. As an environmentalist he led the campaign against the flooding of Lake Pedder, which was dammed in 1972. After leaving politics for himself he supported Peter Garrett's Nuclear Disarmament Party candidature for the Australian Senate in 1984, which almost succeeded.

Over the last decade of his life he campaigned for nuclear disarmament and peace. In 1984 he and the poet Les Murray jointly composed "The Universal Prayer for Peace: A Prayer for the Nuclear Age". A founding member of Australian Lawyers for Nuclear Disarmament in the same year, he was instrumental in its affiliation to the International Association of Lawyers Against Nuclear Arms. In the mid-1980s he co-founded and chaired the Australian Peace Foundation. Inspired by his New Zealand colleague Harold Evans, he was a leading supporter of the World Court Project (WCP), through which his last quest was to ask the International Court of Justice to provide an advisory opinion on the legality of nuclear weapons.

From 1985 St John began writing his major work, an anti-nuclear book Judgment at Hiroshima, with some research assistance from Elizabeth Handsley but died before publication. A Japanese edition appeared in 1995 to coincide with the 50th anniversaries of the atomic destruction of Hiroshima and Nagasaki. His widow Valerie released the English version two years later with copies distributed to research libraries in Australia and overseas.

== Personal life ==
In 1940 St John married Frenchwoman Sylvette Cargher, who died by suicide in 1954. They had two daughters: Madeleine and Colette. Madeleine became a successful yet reclusive writer who was shortlisted for the Man Booker Prize. In 1955 he married Valerie Winslow, who died in 2010. They had three sons: Oliver, Edward (Ed) and Patrick.

== Death ==
St John died on 24 October 1994 in Strathfield, New South Wales. His funeral was held in St Luke's Anglican Church, Mosman. The address was given by Justice Michael Kirby, who recalled St John's relationship to Oliver Cromwell:

In his blood, as he told the House of Representatives in 1967, were the genes of Oliver St John who defended John Hampden when he refused to pay ship money to King Charles I. Oliver married into the Cromwell family.

An obituary titled "A crusader who put his party second" was published in The Sydney Morning Herald on 26 October 1994, and another, "Maverick Liberal caused a storm", by Mungo MacCallum, was published in The Australian on 1 November 1994.

Parliament of Australia
| Preceded by John Cockle | Member for Warringah; 1966–1969 | Succeeded by Michael MacKellar |
