= Francis Bland =

Australian politician (1882–1967)

Francis Bland CMG
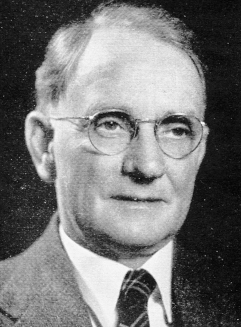

Member of the Australian Parliament for Warringah
- In office 28 April 1951 – 2 November 1961
- Preceded by: Percy Spender
- Succeeded by: John Cockle

Personal details
- Born: Francis Armand Bland; 24 August 1882 Macdonaldtown, New South Wales
- Died: 9 April 1967 (aged 84) Burwood, New South Wales, Australia
- Party: Liberal
- Spouse(s): Elizabeth Jacobs (m. 1908; died 1910) Lillian Orr (m. 1912; died 1951) Ida Warby (m. 1954; died 1960) Gertrude Rollins (m. 1960)
- Children: Henry Bland
- Occupation: Public servant

Francis Armand Bland, CMG (24 August 1882 – 9 April 1967) was an Australian public servant, academic and politician. He was a pioneer of the field of public administration in Australia, serving as the founding chair in public administration at the University of Sydney (1935–1947). He was a member of the House of Representatives from 1951 to 1961, representing the Liberal Party.

== Early life ==
Bland was born on 24 August 1882 in Macdonaldtown, New South Wales. He was the first of six children born to Eva Emily (née Strehz) and Charles Edward Bland. His father was employed as a railway shunter at the time of his birth, but later farmed at Pambula.

Bland attended public schools at Greigs Flat, Peakhurst and Kogarah. He began working as a clerk in 1897 with Bosch, Barthel & Co., then in 1901 joined the New South Wales public service as a taxation clerk in the Treasury Department.

== Academic career ==
Bland attended the University of Sydney as a mature-age student, graduating Bachelor of Arts (1909), Bachelor of Laws (1912) and Master of Arts (1914). He then worked as a tutor before moving to England in 1916 to study at the London School of Economics under Graham Wallas.

In 1918, Bland was appointed assistant director of tutorial classes under G. V. Portus, also giving classes with the Workers' Educational Association. He was appointed as a lecturer in public administration at the University of Sydney in 1930 and wrote a number of textbooks in the absence of existing materials in Australian government. In the same year he introduced a three-year diploma course for public servants covering "economics, public administration, modern political institutions and prescribed arts subjects".

Bland was appointed as the inaugural chair of public administration at the University of Sydney in 1935 and by that time was working as an adviser to state premier Bertram Stevens. He served on the University of Sydney senate from 1944 to 1964. Bland helped create the New South Wales branch of the Institute of Public Administration in 1935 and in 1937 co-founded the journal Public Administration (later renamed the Australian Journal of Public Administration). He served as its editor until 1948. Bland was also a public intellectual, reportedly averaging 50 public addresses per year and publishing regular newspaper articles. He was described as the "father of modern public administration in Australia" by Rae Else-Mitchell.

=== Views and ideas ===
Bland was an advocate of open government and the independence of administrators from legislators. He favoured an increased role for parliamentary committees in the supervision of government, for public officials to be given the opportunity to appear before parliament, and for officials being allowed to publish their views under their own names. He also advocated for formal advisory boards to be constituted to advise government departments.

== Politics ==
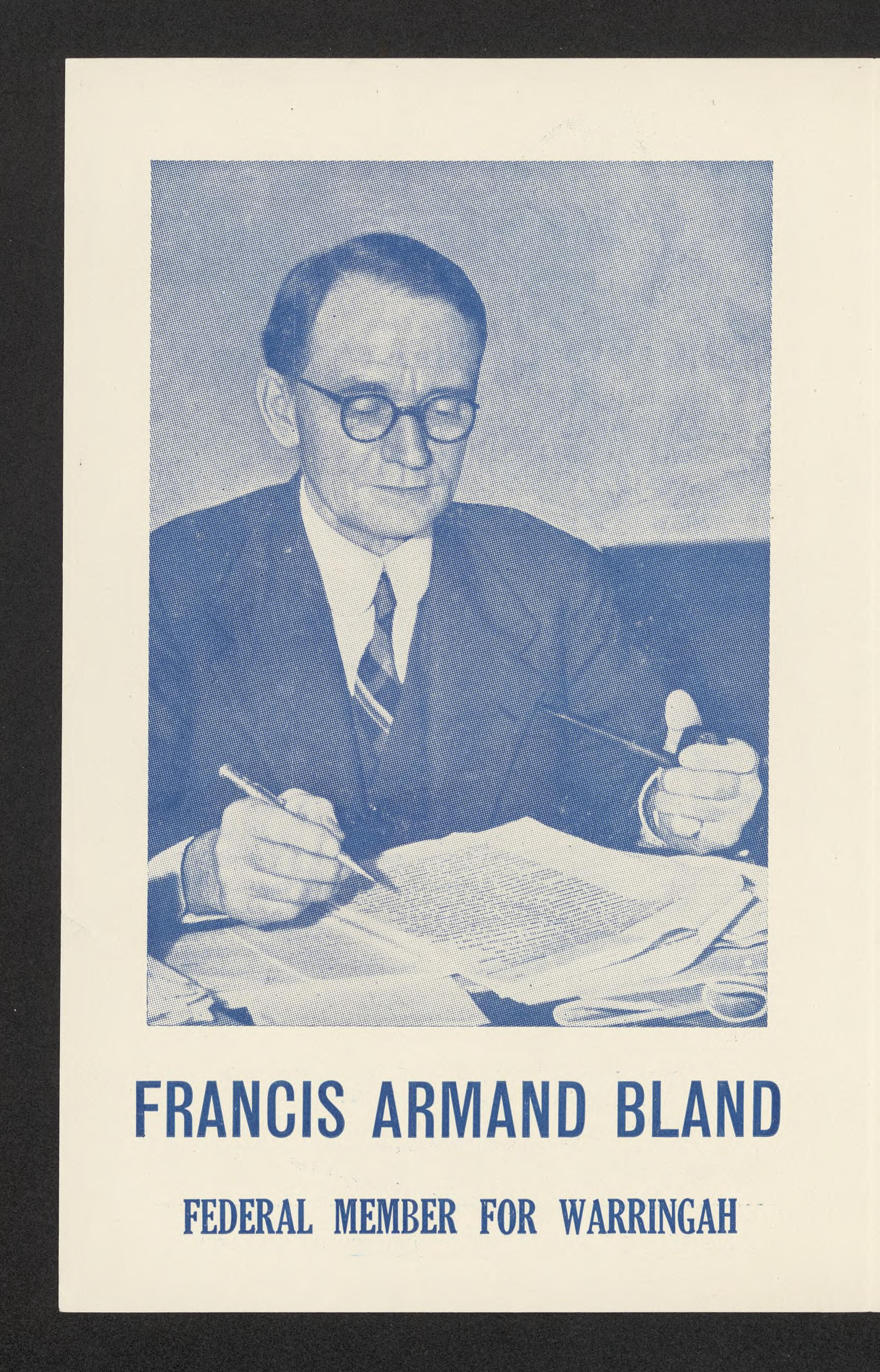
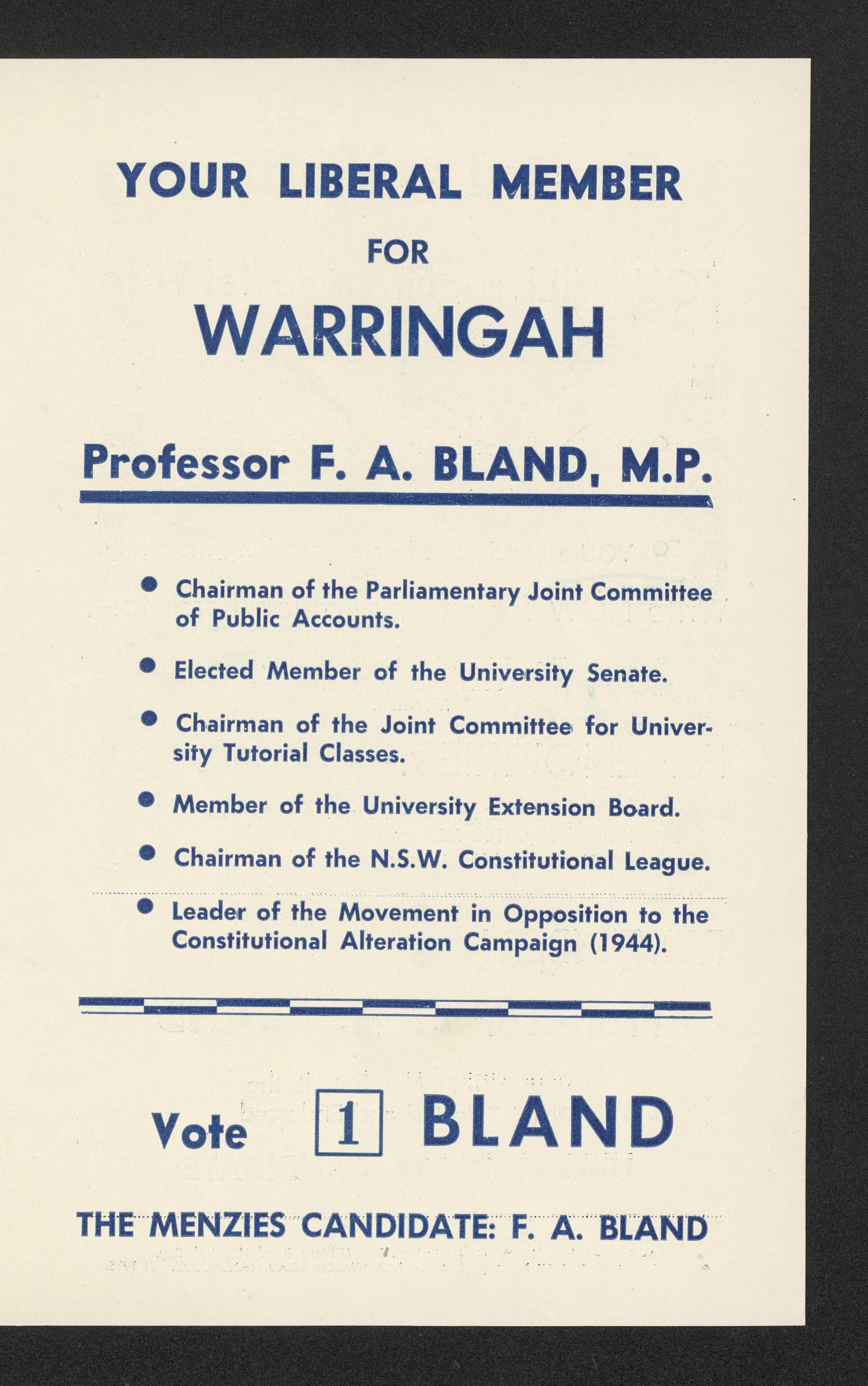
Campaign material used by Bland at the 1954 federal election

Bland was elected to the House of Representatives at the 1951 federal election, aged 68. He ran for the Liberal Party after previously standing unsuccessfully for Senate preselection. He was re-elected on three further occasions. In 1961, he lost Liberal preselection to John Cockle, with his term concluding at the 1961 election.

Bland was an influential figure as chairman of the Joint Statutory Committee on Public Accounts from 1952 to 1960. The committee had been in abeyance for 20 years after being abolished during the Great Depression by the Lyons government. Bland interpreted the committee's mandate broadly and used it to review government policy in general. During the 1951–1954 parliamentary term it published 15 reports on a wide range of topics. Several reports were said to have "embarrassed ministers and senior public servants alike" and Bland as chairman was said to have made it one of "the most effective committees that has ever existed in an Australian parliament".

== Personal life ==
Bland was married four times and was predeceased by three of his wives. Henry Bland, the only child of his first marriage, also became a senior public servant.

== Further sources ==
- Bland, Henry (1975). "Sir Henry Bland interviewed by Mel Pratt for the Mel Pratt collection" (Interview). Interviewed by Mel Pratt.
- Gladden, E.N. (1975). "Francis Armand Bland: Australian Public Administration Pioneer". International Review of Administrative Sciences. 41 (2): 103–108. doi:10.1177/002085237504100201.
- Jones, Kate; Jacobs, Kerry (2014). "The Cerberus from Warringah: F.A. Bland and the Renaissance of the Public Accounts Committee". Australian Journal of Politics & History. 60 (1): 43–57. doi:10.1111/ajph.12044.

Parliament of Australia
Preceded by Percy Spender	Member for Warringah; 1951–1961	Succeeded by John Cockle
