= Gunnedah Shire =

- Local government area
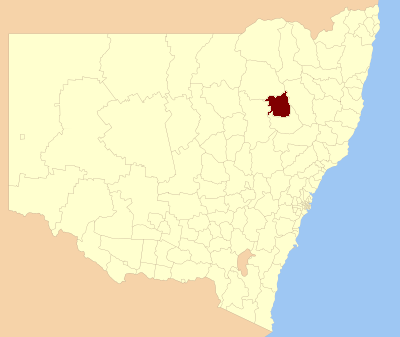
- Location in New South Wales

- Interactive map of Gunnedah Shire
- Coordinates: 30°58′S 150°15′E
- Country: Australia
- State: New South Wales
- Region: North West Slopes
- Established: 1 January 1980
- Council seat: Gunnedah

Government
  - Mayor: Colleen Fuller
  - State electorate: Tamworth
  - Federal division: Parkes

Area
  - Total: 4,994 km^{2} (1,928 sq mi)

Population
  - Total: 12,929 (2021 census)
  - Density: 2.5889/km^{2} (6.7052/sq mi)
- Website: Gunnedah Shire
LGAs around Gunnedah Shire
Narrabri	Narrabri	Tamworth
Warrumbungle	Gunnedah Shire	Tamworth
Warrumbungle	Liverpool Plains	Liverpool Plains

Gunnedah Shire is a local government area in the North West Slopes region of New South Wales, Australia. The Shire is located adjacent to the Liverpool Plains in the Namoi River valley and is traversed by the Oxley Highway and the Kamilaroi Highway.

The Shire was established in 1980 from the amalgamation of the Municipality of Gunnedah and Liverpool Plains Shire. It includes the town of Gunnedah and surrounding villages of Curlewis, Breeza, Carroll, Mullaley, Emerald Hill, Tambar Springs and Kelvin.

The mayor of Gunnedah is councillor Colleen Fuller, an independent.

== Geography ==
The Gunnedah Shire is situated on the Liverpool Plains between the Nandewar and Great Dividing Ranges, with the tallest hills being 400 to 500 metres (1,300 to 1,600 ft) above sea level. The climate is hot in summer, mild in winter and dry, although heavy rain in catchment areas occasionally cause flooding of the Namoi River. Major floods cut transport links to Gunnedah, briefly isolating it from the outside world. The Gunnedah area is noted for its abundance of native wildlife, including kangaroos, echidnas and koalas. Koalas can often be found in trees within the town, as well as in the surrounding countryside with the help of signs placed by the local tourist centre.

== Demographics ==
At the 2016 census, there were 12,215 people in the Gunnedah local government area, of which there was an equal number of males and females. Aboriginal and Torres Strait Islander people made up 12.8% of the population which is over four times higher than both the national and state averages. The median age of people in the Gunnedah Shire was 40 years; slightly higher than the national median of 38. Children aged 0–14 years made up 20.6% of the population and people aged 65 years and over made up 19% of the population. Of people in the area aged 15 years and over, almost half were married (48.1%) and 11.6% were either divorced or separated.

Population growth in the Gunnedah Shire between the 2001 census and the 2011 census was nominal. When compared with total population growth of Australia for the same periods, being 5.78% and 8.32% respectively, population growth in the Gunnedah local government area was significantly lower than the national average. The median weekly income for residents within the Gunnedah Shire was significantly below the national average.

At the 2011 census, the proportion of residents in the Gunnedah local government area who stated their ancestry as Australian or Anglo-Saxon exceeded 87% of all residents (national average was 65.2%). In excess of 72% of all residents in the Gunnedah Shire nominated a religious affiliation with Christianity at the 2011 census, which was significantly higher than the national average of 50.2%. Meanwhile, as at the census date, compared to the national average, households in the Gunnedah local government area had a significantly lower than average proportion (2.3%) where two or more languages are spoken (national average was 20.4%); and a significantly higher proportion (92.9%) where English only was spoken at home (national average was 76.8%).

Selected historical census data for Gunnedah Shire local government area
Census year		2001	2006	2011	2016
Population	Estimated residents on Census night	11,976	11,525	12,066	12,215
Population	LGA rank in terms of size within New South Wales				
Population	% of New South Wales population			0.17%	▼0.16%
Population	% of Australian population	0.06%	0.06%	0.06%	▼0.05%
Cultural and language diversity					
Ancestry, top responses	Australian			37.6%	▲38.8
Ancestry, top responses	English			30.5%	▼28.5%
Ancestry, top responses	Irish			8.8%	▼8.4%
Ancestry, top responses	Scottish			7.6%	▼7.2%
Ancestry, top responses	German			3.2%	▲3.5%
Language, top responses (other than English)	Mandarin	n/c	n/c	▲0.2%	▲0.3%
Language, top responses (other than English)	Afrikaans				0.3%
Language, top responses (other than English)	Tagalog				0.2%
Language, top responses (other than English)	German	0.1%	▲0.2%	▼0.1%	0.1%
Language, top responses (other than English)	Portuguese	n/c	n/c	▲0.1%	
Language, top responses (other than English)	Cantonese	0.1%	0.1%	0.1%	0.1%
Language, top responses (other than English)	Italian	0.2%	▼ n/c	▲0.1%	
Religious affiliation					
Religious affiliation, top responses	Anglican	39.3%	▼38.0%	▼34.7%	▼29.7%
Religious affiliation, top responses	Catholic	27.5%	▼27.2%	▼26.9%	▼26.2%
Religious affiliation, top responses	No Religion	6.7%	▲9.3%	▲12.8%	▲20.1%
Religious affiliation, top responses	Presbyterian and Reformed	6.9%	▼6.1%	▼5.4%	▼4.9%
Religious affiliation, top responses	Uniting Church	6.5%	▼5.6%	▼5.0%	
Median weekly incomes					
Personal income	Median weekly personal income		A$366	A$485	A$618
Personal income	% of Australian median income		78.5%	▲84.1%	▲93.3%
Family income	Median weekly family income		A$915	A$1,200	A$1,586
Family income	% of Australian median income		78.1%	▲81.0%	▲91.5%
Household income	Median weekly household income		A$714	A$937	A$1,253
Household income	% of Australian median income		69.5%	▲75.9%	▲87.1%

== Council ==
=== Current composition and election method ===
Gunnedah Shire Council is composed of nine councillors elected proportionally as a single ward. All councillors are elected for a fixed four-year term of office. The mayor is elected by the councillors at the first meeting of the council. The most recent election was held on 14 September 2024.

== Election results ==
=== 2024 ===
2024 New South Wales local elections: Gunnedah
Party	Candidate	Votes	%	±%
Independent	Colleen Fuller (elected)	2,375	32.6	+5.7
Independent	Tammey McAllan (elected)	830	11.4	
Independent Labor	Linda Newell (elected)	739	10.1	
Independent National	Robert (Rob) Hooke (elected)	692	9.5	+6.2
Independent National	Robert Hoddle (elected)	529	7.3	+4.0
Labor	Kate McGrath (elected)	509	7.0	−1.0
Independent	Ann Luke (elected)	472	6.5	+1.9
Independent National	Juliana McArthur (elected)	396	5.4	+0.7
Independent	Mitchum Neave	369	5.1	
Independent	Cameron Moore (elected)	219	3.0	
Independent	Greg Petersen	166	2.3	
Total formal votes		7,296	92.8	
Informal votes		568	7.2	
Turnout		7,864	83.6	

=== 2021 ===
2021 New South Wales local elections: Gunnedah
Party	Candidate	Votes	%	±%
Independent	Jamie Chaffey (elected)	2,041	28.5	
Independent	Colleen Fuller (elected)	1,926	26.9	
Independent Labor	Kate McGrath (elected)	573	8.0	
Independent National	Murray O'Keefe (elected)	551	7.7	
Independent	David Moses (elected)	434	6.1	
Independent National	Juliana McArthur (elected)	334	4.7	
Independent	Ann Luke (elected)	330	4.4	
Independent National	Robert Hoddle (elected)	235	3.3	
Independent National	Robert Hooke (elected)	234	3.3	
Independent	Peter Wills	227	3.2	
Independent	Michael Silver	188	2.6	
Independent	Wendy Eriksen	91	1.3	
Total formal votes		7,164	95.9	
Informal votes		309	4.1	
Turnout		7,473	82.5	
