= Cryon, New South Wales =

Location in New South Wales, Australia

Cryon
- Town
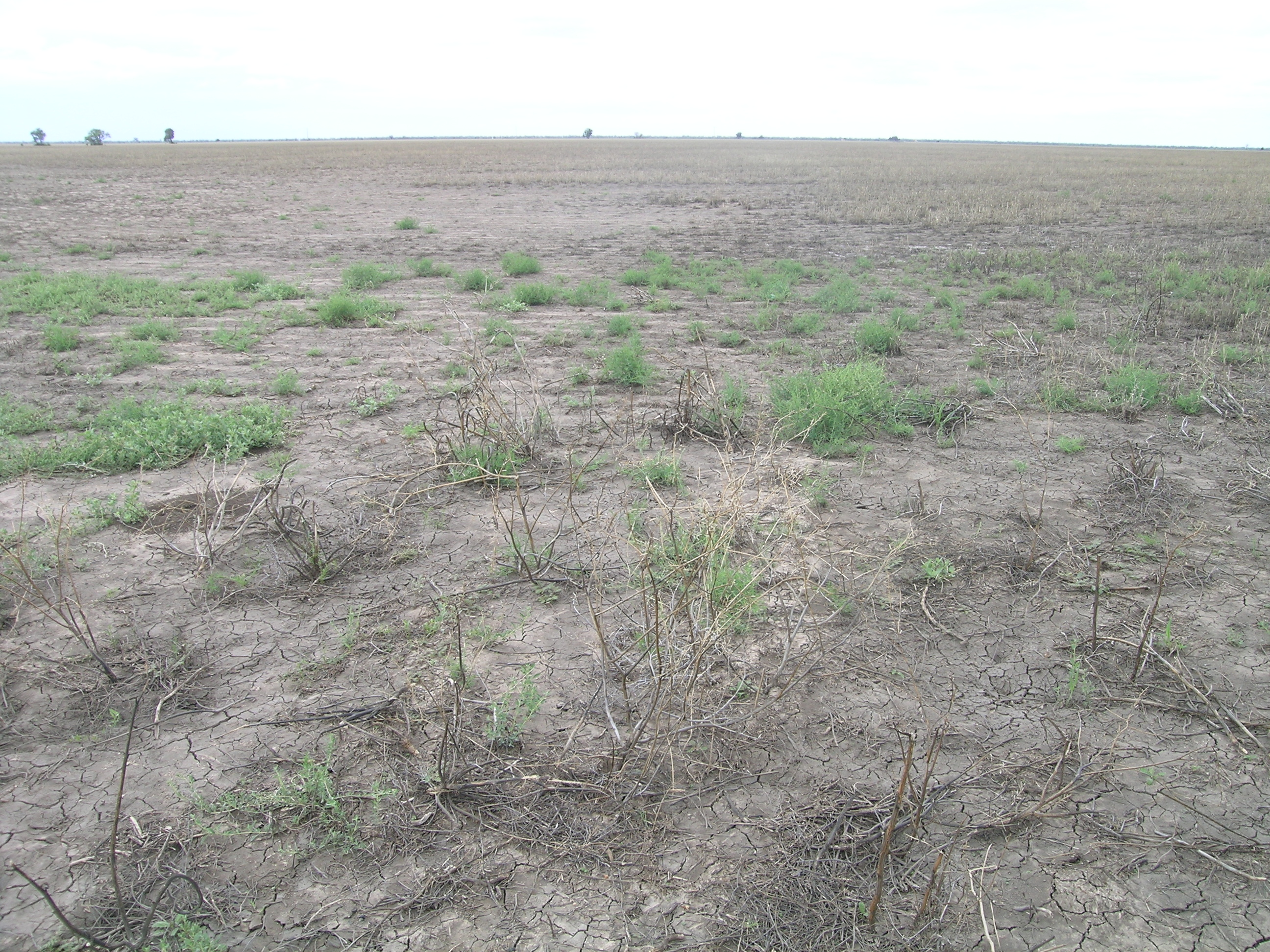
- A paddock on the plain near Cryon

- Coordinates: 30°00′16″S 148°36′46″E
- Country: Australia
- State: New South Wales
- LGA: Walgett Shire
- Location: 39 km (24 mi) W of Burren Junction; 52 km (32 mi) E of Walgett; 622 km (386 mi) NNW of Sydney; 666 km (414 mi) SW of Brisbane

Government
  - State electorate: Barwon
  - Federal division: Parkes
- Elevation: 146 m (479 ft)

Population
  - Total: 39 (SAL 2021)
- Postcode: 2387
- County: Denham

Cryon is a parish and hamlet in the north-west of New South Wales, Australia. It lies in the Walgett Shire and is situated 622 km (386 mi) from Sydney, 130 km (81 mi) west of Narrabri and 52 km (32 mi) east of Walgett on the Kamilaroi Highway. The settlement sits at an altitude of about 146 metres (479 ft). When the Walgett railway line arrived here in 1905 this was a thriving settlement with a variety of businesses including a hotel and stores. For quite a few years it was the loading point for cattle from South West Queensland that were railed to the Sydney market. The railway now only carries freight (grain).

Only a few buildings remain, together with a wheat silo and several new bunker storages.

The main industry is wheat farming with some livestock raised.

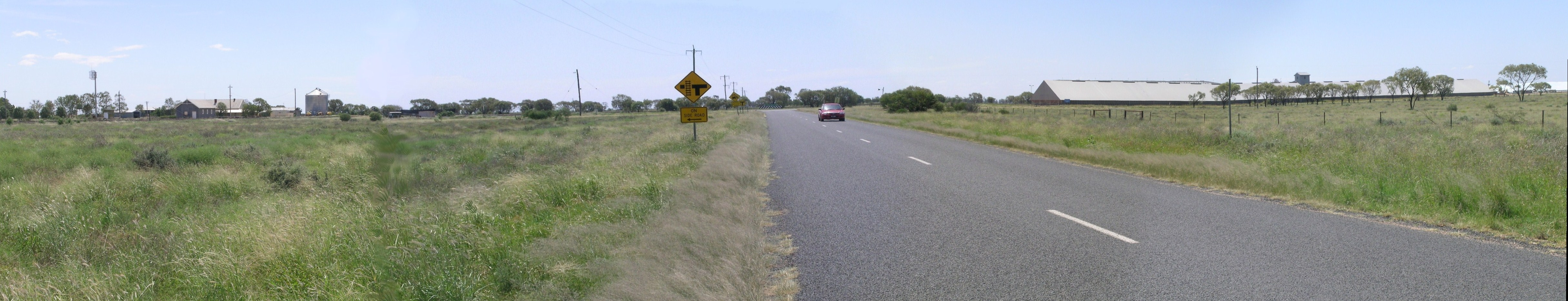
The hall and the silos at Cryon, NSW
