= Denham County =

Denham New South Wales
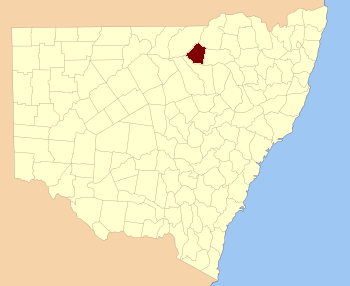
- Location in New South Wales
Lands administrative divisions around Denham:
Finch	Finch	Benarba
Finch	Denham	Jamison
Baradine	Baradine	Baradine

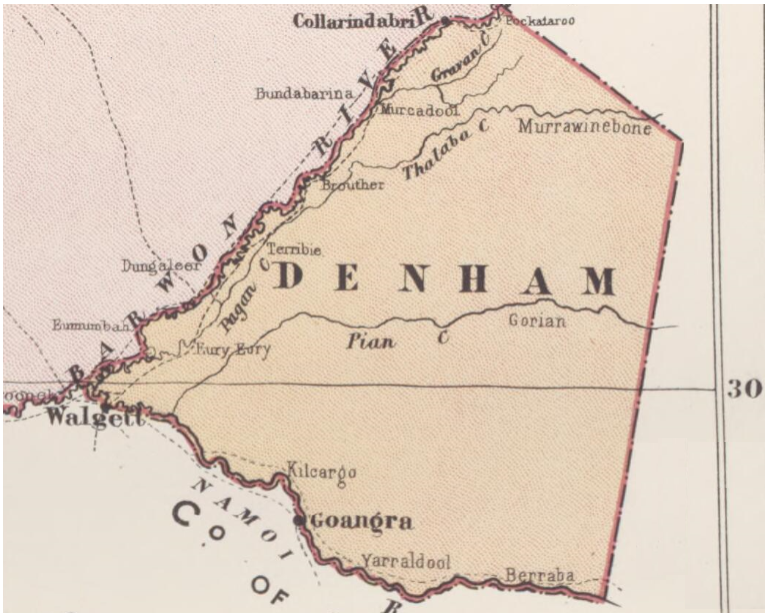
Denham_County

Denham County, is one of the 141 cadastral divisions of New South Wales. It lies between the Barwon River and the Namoi River, where the two rivers meet. It includes the localities of Koothney, Cryon and Bugilbone.

Denham County was named in honour of Captain H. M. Denham, H.M.S. Herald.

== Parishes within this county ==
A full list of parishes found within this county; their current LGA and mapping coordinates to the approximate centre of each location is as follows:

Parish	LGA	Coordinates
Baraneal	Walgett Shire	30°06′54″S 148°28′04″E
Barwon	Walgett Shire	29°41′54″S 148°26′04″E
Benn	Walgett Shire	30°03′54″S 148°42′04″E
Bergan	Walgett Shire	30°07′54″S 148°34′04″E
Berryabar	Walgett Shire	30°13′54″S 148°38′04″E
Browne	Walgett Shire	29°43′54″S 148°40′04″E
Bugilbone	Walgett Shire	30°13′54″S 148°46′04″E
Buriembri	Walgett Shire	29°57′54″S 148°24′04″E
Cabul	Walgett Shire	29°48′54″S 148°32′04″E
Christie	Walgett Shire	29°42′54″S 148°50′04″E
Cryon	Walgett Shire	29°53′54″S 148°37′04″E
Denham	Walgett Shire	30°01′54″S 148°24′04″E
Denuleroi	Walgett Shire	29°53′54″S 148°24′04″E
Dewhurst	Walgett Shire	29°41′54″S 148°40′04″E
Eastlake	Walgett Shire	29°59′54″S 148°46′04″E
Eton	Walgett Shire	29°48′54″S 148°50′04″E
Eurie Eurie	Walgett Shire	29°53′54″S 148°18′04″E
Finley	Walgett Shire	29°48′54″S 148°45′04″E
Glass	Walgett Shire	29°55′54″S 148°12′04″E
Gorian	Walgett Shire	29°52′54″S 148°50′04″E
Jereel	Walgett Shire	30°08′54″S 148°39′04″E
Katambone	Walgett Shire	30°04′54″S 148°47′04″E
Long Point	Walgett Shire	29°35′54″S 148°41′04″E
Manilla	Walgett Shire	29°51′54″S 148°20′04″E
Merrywinebone	Walgett Shire	29°42′54″S 148°45′04″E
Mungerarra	Walgett Shire	29°57′54″S 148°30′04″E
Murkadool	Walgett Shire	29°39′54″S 148°33′04″E
Murra Murra	Walgett Shire	29°56′54″S 148°47′04″E
Myall	Walgett Shire	30°02′54″S 148°31′04″E
Myallwirrie	Walgett Shire	30°11′54″S 148°28′04″E
Pagan	Walgett Shire	29°49′54″S 148°22′04″E
Pearse	Walgett Shire	29°50′54″S 148°39′04″E
Pian	Walgett Shire	29°57′54″S 148°18′04″E
Pokataroo	Walgett Shire	29°35′54″S 148°34′04″E
Reynolds	Walgett Shire	29°59′54″S 148°37′04″E
Roberts	Walgett Shire	29°42′54″S 148°33′04″E
Tareela	Walgett Shire	30°09′54″S 148°46′04″E
Terribie	Walgett Shire	29°49′54″S 148°16′04″E
Thalaba	Walgett Shire	29°52′54″S 148°32′04″E
Tholoo	Walgett Shire	30°03′54″S 148°35′04″E
Toryweewha	Walgett Shire	30°05′54″S 148°24′04″E
Walgett	Walgett Shire	29°57′54″S 148°12′04″E
Walmar	Walgett Shire	30°03′54″S 148°18′04″E
Yarraldool	Walgett Shire	30°15′54″S 148°32′04″E
