= Vendor disclosure law in Australia =

According to the ACL, property sellers and agents must disclose any defects in a property, which a buyer is planning to buy. Lying by omission would lead to breach of contract. This law does not mean that the property dealer guarantees the good title of the property but that he/she has not done anything, or is not aware of anything, which would make their title defective. Each Australian state and territory has modified this common law differently.

== Table ==
This table shows that the law varies from state to state. The data have been updated to 2017.

State/Territory	Requirements
Australian Capital Territory	Energy Efficiency Rating Statement; A Building and Compliance Inspection report; Asbestos Advice and Assessment Report; A Pest Inspection Report; The land's Crown Lease; The certificate's current edition of title for the crown lease; The deposited plan; Lease Conveyancing Inquiry Documents for the property; A building Conveyancing Inquiry Document; Information about the body corporate and levies payable; Any other encumbrances
New South Wales	A property seller should attach a section 149 certificate for the lot to the contract. Other mandatory property dealer disclosure documents require the following information: A land diagram from an accepted sewerage authority; A property certificate and a land plan's copy issued by LPMA/any of its antecedents; Copies of all deeds, dealings etc. lodged or registered in LPMA; If in a strata scheme/lot under a community plan, precinct plan/neighbourhood plan, copies of all deeds dealings, copies of easements etc., profits, restrictions on the land use, covenants, property certificates, a building management statement and a strata scheme by-law
Victoria	A property seller's section 32 statement should be given to the buyer earlier the contract is signed/exchanged. This section requires information such as: Statutory warnings to the purchaser; Property seller details; Title details; Any building permits details issued over the last seven years; Owner-builder warranty insurance details; Written inspection report if building works were completed.; Any land mortgages, debts or charges; Information about any the title restrictions; Planning information; Information about the property owner's expenses; Any notices or orders issued by the authorities, regarding the property; Is there access to the property by road?; Information on services connected to the property; Any other variables
Queensland	Registered land encumbrances; Unregistered leases and tenancy agreements; Pool fencing compliance certificate
South Australia	A Form 1 Vendor's Statement should be given to the buyer at least ten days earlier settlement - or two days before the auction day if a property is for sale by bidding. The statement requires information such as: Are any restrictions on the title exist?; Types of services connected to the property; The rates; Zoning; Notices; Orders; Building approvals; And other details if the property is strata-titled.
Western Australia	In Western Australia only the basic rules apply. But if the property is strata-titled, the strata plan's copy, the strata scheme by-laws and the unit entitlement should be available to property dealer.
Tasmania	Any information about building, electrical/plumbing work; Any planning details; Is the property heritage listed/in the process of being heritage listed?; Notice, orders, letter, judgements or writs issued regarding the property; Any building defects; Indemnity insurance policy; Information on the use any asbestos as a construction material in any building on the property if it has been used; Has the property seller lived at the property since purchase?
Northern Territory	A report about a building status; The property dealer should state his knowledge of any contamination, or a drug premises order; A land Titles Office title search; Registered and unregistered encumbrances details; Unit information; Evidence of occupancy/tenancy; A swimming pool fencing compliance certificate; A rates notice.

== Criticism ==
In 2006 Queensland industry experts expressed the view supporting a universal Vendor Disclosure Statement for Australia that presents information "in such a way as to unambiguous, clear, and concise and which is known to the vendor or which should be known". They were convinced that "smarter disclosure, focussing on identifying the product attributes" will improve the real estate industry's standards and image. Experts believed that "there should be an executive summary or checklist of disclosure requirements", since few buyers had read/understand current (at that time) disclosure legislation, which was characterized by complex "legalese" language. That means experts calling for "additional, yet smarter and user-friendly disclosure which focuses on outlining a property's attributes".

== See also ==
- Land and Valuation Court of New South Wales
