= Wellesley County =

Administrative area in New South Wales, Australia

Wellesley New South Wales
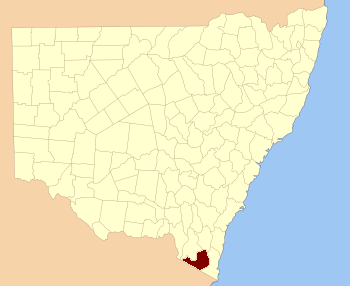
- Location in New South Wales
Lands administrative divisions around Wellesley:
Wallace	Beresford	Auckland
Wallace	Wellesley	Auckland
Tambo (Vic)	Croajingolong (Vic)	Auckland

Wellesley County is one of the 141 cadastral divisions of New South Wales. It is located along the border with Victoria, with the Snowy River part of the northern boundary. It includes Bombala.

Wellesley County was named in honour of Governor General of India Richard Colley Wellesley, Marquis Wellesley (1760–1842).

== Parishes within this county ==
A full list of parishes found within this county; their current LGA and mapping coordinates to the approximate centre of each location is as follows:

Parish	LGA	Coordinates
Alexander	Snowy Monaro Regional Council	36°49′54″S 148°40′04″E
Ashton	Snowy Monaro Regional Council	36°56′54″S 149°06′04″E
Biddi	Snowy Monaro Regional Council	36°45′54″S 148°30′04″E
Boco	Snowy Monaro Regional Council	36°30′54″S 149°12′04″E
Bombala	Snowy Monaro Regional Council	36°54′14″S 149°14′25″E
Bungarby	Snowy Monaro Regional Council	36°40′54″S 149°01′04″E
Bungee	Snowy Monaro Regional Council	36°36′54″S 149°06′04″E
Burnima	Snowy Monaro Regional Council	36°50′54″S 149°17′04″E
Burrimbucco	Snowy Monaro Regional Council	36°58′54″S 149°20′04″E
Byadbo	Snowy Monaro Regional Council	36°50′54″S 148°30′04″E
Cambalong	Snowy Monaro Regional Council	36°46′54″S 149°05′04″E
Cathcart	Snowy Monaro Regional Council	36°49′54″S 149°24′04″E
Coolumbooka	Snowy Monaro Regional Council	36°53′54″S 149°20′04″E
Cooper	Snowy Monaro Regional Council	36°36′54″S 149°10′04″E
Corrowong	Snowy Monaro Regional Council	36°59′54″S 148°50′04″E
Creewah	Snowy Monaro Regional Council	36°44′54″S 149°23′04″E
Delegate	Snowy Monaro Regional Council	35°59′54″S 149°00′04″E
Gecar	Snowy Monaro Regional Council	36°53′54″S 149°09′04″E
Glenbog	Snowy Monaro Regional Council	36°33′54″S 149°17′04″E
Grenville	Snowy Monaro Regional Council	36°50′54″S 148°46′04″E
Gulgin	Snowy Monaro Regional Council	37°02′54″S 149°16′04″E
Gunning Grach	Snowy Monaro Regional Council	36°44′54″S 149°11′04″E
Hayen	Snowy Monaro Regional Council	36°59′24″S 149°03′34″E
Ironmungy	Snowy Monaro Regional Council	36°35′54″S 149°01′04″E
Jettiba	Snowy Monaro Regional Council	36°36′54″S 149°15′04″E
Lawson	Snowy Monaro Regional Council	37°07′54″S 149°07′04″E
Maffra	Snowy Monaro Regional Council	36°31′54″S 149°00′04″E
Maharatta	Snowy Monaro Regional Council	36°58′04″S 149°12′34″E
Meringo	Snowy Monaro Regional Council	36°52′54″S 149°05′04″E
Merriangaah	Snowy Monaro Regional Council	36°49′54″S 149°00′04″E
Merrumbulo	Snowy Monaro Regional Council	36°46′54″S 148°41′04″E
Mila	Snowy Monaro Regional Council	36°59′04″S 149°06′54″E
Mount Trooper	Snowy Monaro Regional Council	36°50′54″S 148°26′04″E
Nelson	Snowy Monaro Regional Council	36°33′54″S 149°06′04″E
Nimmitabel	Snowy Monaro Regional Council	36°29′54″S 149°15′04″E
Peters	Snowy Monaro Regional Council	36°44′54″S 149°00′04″E
Pickering	Snowy Monaro Regional Council	36°45′54″S 149°15′04″E
Quidong	Snowy Monaro Regional Council	36°53′54″S 149°00′04″E
Rodney	Snowy Monaro Regional Council	36°51′54″S 148°54′04″E
Tangaroo	Snowy Monaro Regional Council	36°47′54″S 148°27′04″E
Tarrabandra	Snowy Monaro Regional Council	36°53′54″S 148°30′04″E
Thoko	Snowy Monaro Regional Council	36°40′54″S 149°22′04″E
Tingaringi	Snowy Monaro Regional Council	36°54′54″S 148°39′04″E
Tivy	Snowy Monaro Regional Council	36°39′54″S 149°11′04″E
Tombong	Snowy Monaro Regional Council	36°55′54″S 148°53′04″E
Wangellic	Snowy Monaro Regional Council	36°42′54″S 149°07′04″E
Wellington	Snowy Monaro Regional Council	36°30′54″S 149°05′04″E
Wellsmore	Snowy Monaro Regional Council	36°43′54″S 149°15′04″E
Wollondibby	Snowy Monaro Regional Council	37°00′54″S 148°44′04″E
