= Tambo County =

Tambo County may refer to:

- County of Tambo, Queensland
- County of Tambo, Victoria
