= Pokataroo railway line =

Railway line in New South Wales, Australia

The Pokataroo railway line is a railway line in New South Wales, Australia. It branches from the Walgett line at Burren Junction, and opened in 1906. There are signs of the line being constructed across the Barwon River all the way to Collarenebri, New South Wales

The line is closed beyond Merrywinebone. Passenger services were withdrawn in 1974. The line is primarily used for grain haulage with large grain loading facilities located at Merrywinebone and Rowena.

Pokataroo is 716 km (445 mi) from Sydney. Pokataroo station precinct features a turning triangle used to reverse the direction of a locomotive prior to commencing a return journey.

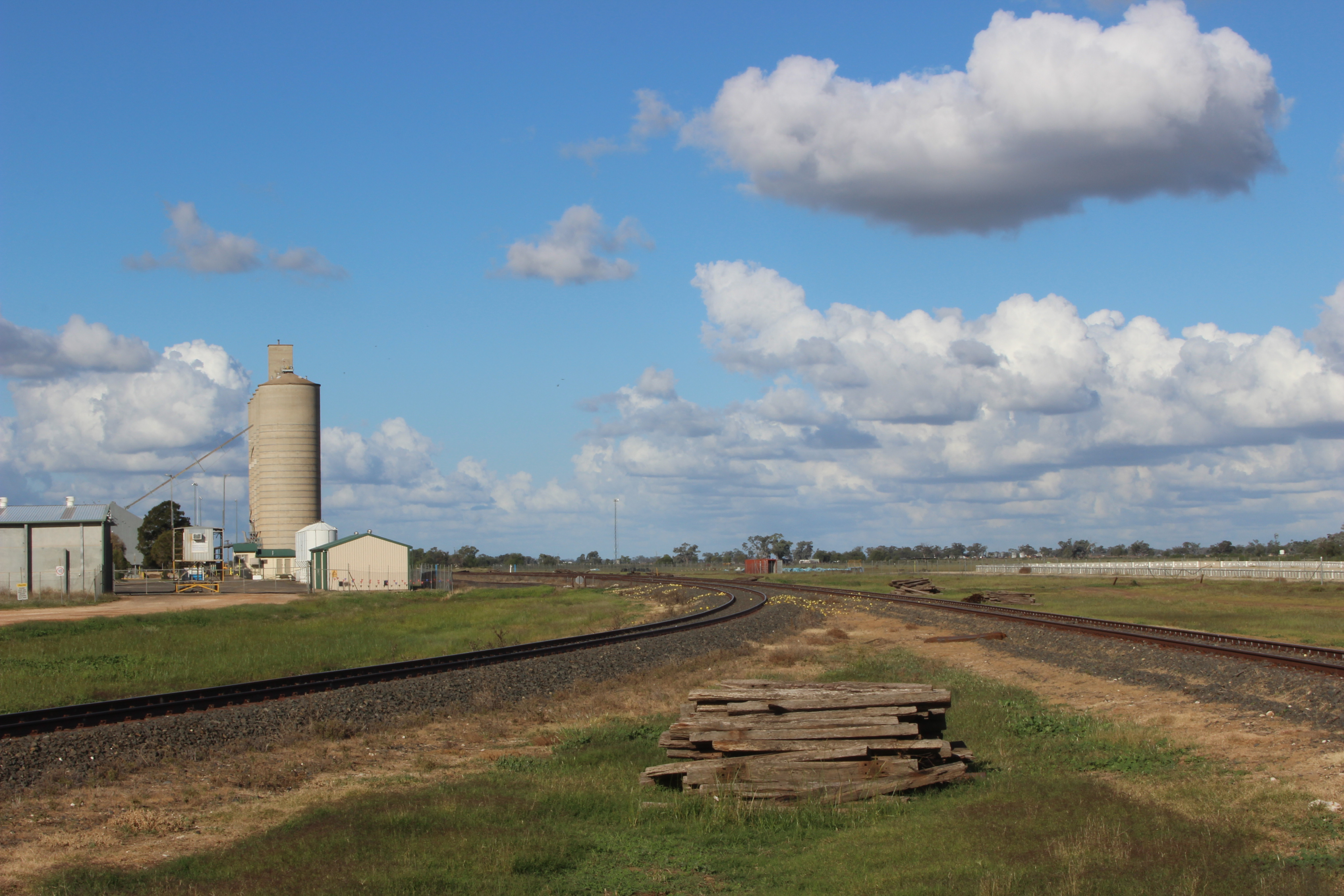
Burren Junction

== See also ==
- Rail transport in New South Wales
- Rail rollingstock in New South Wales
