= Land District of Queanbeyan =

Land District of Queanbeyan New South Wales
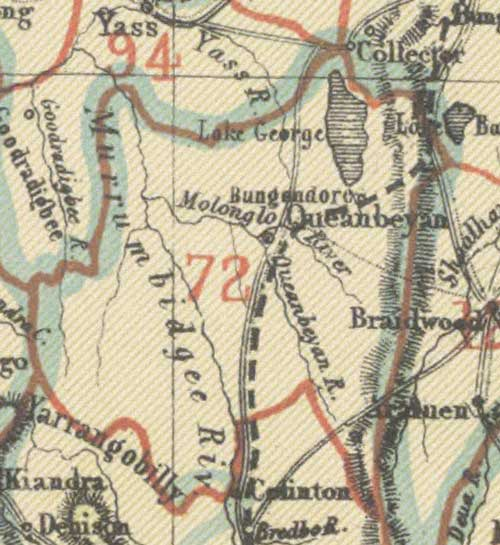
- Map of the district in 1907
- LGA(s): Yarrowlumla Shire (former)
- County: Murray, Cowley, Buccleuch
- Division: Eastern
Lands administrative divisions around Land District of Queanbeyan:
Yass	Yass	Goulburn
Tumut	Land District of Queanbeyan	Braidwood
Tumut	Cooma	Braidwood

The Land District of Queanbeyan was one of the around 100 land districts of New South Wales which were introduced with the Crown Lands Act of 1884. It was based around the town of Queanbeyan, and included the area from near Lake George in the north, to Colinton in the south, and west to the Goodradigbee River and beyond it. In 1909, a large part of the district was transferred to the Commonwealth government to become the Australian Capital Territory.

The district was located in the Eastern Division, and included land in the counties of Murray and Cowley, and a small part of Buccleuch. In 1890 the district was part of the Cooma Land Board. By 1907 the district was administered by the Goulburn Land Board. Cadastral maps made in the area have the name of the land district written on them.
