= Beresford County =

Beresford New South Wales
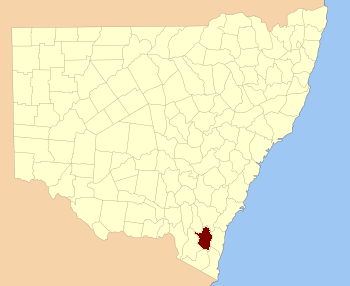
- Location in New South Wales
Lands administrative divisions around Beresford:
Cowley	Murray	Murray
Wallace	Beresford	Dampier
Wallace	Wellesley	Auckland

Beresford County is one of the 141 cadastral divisions of New South Wales. It contains Cooma and Bredbo. Part of the Murrumbidgee River forms the boundary in the north-west, and a separate part of the river forms part of the western boundary.

Beresford County was named in honour of Viscount William Carr Beresford (1768–1854).

== Parishes within this county ==
A full list of parishes found within this county; their current LGA and mapping coordinates to the approximate centre of each location is as follows:

Parish	LGA	Coordinates
Abercrombie	Snowy Monaro Regional Council	36°01′54″S 149°15′04″E
Big Badja	Snowy Monaro Regional Council	36°02′54″S 149°32′04″E
Billilingra	Snowy Monaro Regional Council	36°00′54″S 149°09′04″E
Binjura	Snowy Monaro Regional Council	36°11′54″S 149°06′04″E
Bransby	Snowy Monaro Regional Council	35°55′54″S 149°09′04″E
Bredbo	Snowy Monaro Regional Council	35°59′54″S 149°00′04″E
Brest	Snowy Monaro Regional Council	35°57′54″S 148°56′04″E
Bulgundramine	Snowy Monaro Regional Council	36°25′54″S 149°16′04″E
Bullanamang	Snowy Monaro Regional Council	35°56′54″S 149°05′04″E
Bunyan	Snowy Monaro Regional Council	36°16′54″S 149°11′04″E
Callaghan	Snowy Monaro Regional Council	36°03′54″S 149°12′04″E
Clifford	Snowy Monaro Regional Council	36°05′54″S 149°14′04″E
Colinton	Snowy Monaro Regional Council	35°50′54″S 149°12′04″E
Coolringdon	Snowy Monaro Regional Council	36°13′54″S 148°58′04″E
Cooma	Snowy Monaro Regional Council	36°14′54″S 149°07′04″E
Cosgrove	Snowy Monaro Regional Council	35°59′54″S 149°00′04″E
Dangelong	Snowy Monaro Regional Council	36°17′54″S 149°16′04″E
Duncan	Snowy Monaro Regional Council	35°54′54″S 148°50′04″E
Flinders	Snowy Monaro Regional Council	35°56′54″S 149°00′04″E
Gladstone	Snowy Monaro Regional Council	36°19′54″S 149°10′04″E
Good Good	Snowy Monaro Regional Council	36°02′54″S 149°27′04″E
Gungoandra	Snowy Monaro Regional Council	35°53′54″S 149°11′04″E
Hill	Snowy Monaro Regional Council	35°55′54″S 149°28′04″E
Holland	Snowy Monaro Regional Council	35°46′54″S 149°22′04″E
Jillimatong	Snowy Monaro Regional Council	36°17′54″S 148°59′04″E
Kybeyan	Snowy Monaro Regional Council	36°22′54″S 149°27′04″E
Kydra	Snowy Monaro Regional Council	36°27′54″S 149°25′04″E
Lucas	Snowy Monaro Regional Council	36°15′54″S 149°24′04″E
Michelago	Snowy Monaro Regional Council	35°47′54″S 149°10′04″E
Milford	Snowy Monaro Regional Council	35°49′54″S 149°22′04″E
Montagu	Snowy Monaro Regional Council	36°15′54″S 149°16′04″E
Murrumbucca	Snowy Monaro Regional Council	36°03′54″S 148°59′04″E
Numeralla	Snowy Monaro Regional Council	36°10′54″S 149°16′04″E
Onslow	Snowy Monaro Regional Council	35°48′54″S 149°17′04″E
Palmerston	Snowy Monaro Regional Council	36°22′54″S 149°27′04″E
Rivers	Snowy Monaro Regional Council	36°17′54″S 149°21′04″E
Rose Valley	Snowy Monaro Regional Council	36°07′54″S 149°23′04″E
Rowland	Snowy Monaro Regional Council	35°55′54″S 149°23′04″E
Sherlock	Snowy Monaro Regional Council	35°49′54″S 149°27′04″E
Stannard	Snowy Monaro Regional Council	36°00′54″S 149°21′04″E
The Brothers	Snowy Monaro Regional Council	36°19′54″S 149°07′04″E
Throsby	Snowy Monaro Regional Council	36°23′54″S 149°21′04″E
Tinderry	Snowy Monaro Regional Council	35°45′54″S 149°15′04″E
Undoo	Snowy Monaro Regional Council	36°09′54″S 149°28′04″E
Wangrah	Snowy Monaro Regional Council	35°52′54″S 149°19′04″E
Winifred	Snowy Monaro Regional Council	36°30′54″S 149°24′04″E
Wise	Snowy Monaro Regional Council	35°40′54″S 149°20′04″E
Woolumla	Snowy Monaro Regional Council	36°05′54″S 149°09′04″E
York	Snowy Monaro Regional Council	36°02′10″S 149°05′29″E
