= County of Croajingolong =

Coordinates: 37°30′S 149°00′E

Croajingolong Victoria
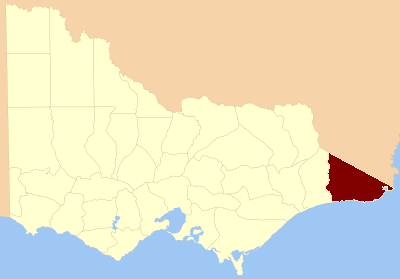
- Location in Victoria
- Established: 24 February 1871
- Area: 8,830 km^{2} (3,409.3 sq mi)
Lands administrative divisions around Croajingolong:
Tambo	Wellesley (NSW)	Auckland (NSW)
Tambo	Croajingolong	Tasman Sea
Bass Strait	Bass Strait	Bass Strait

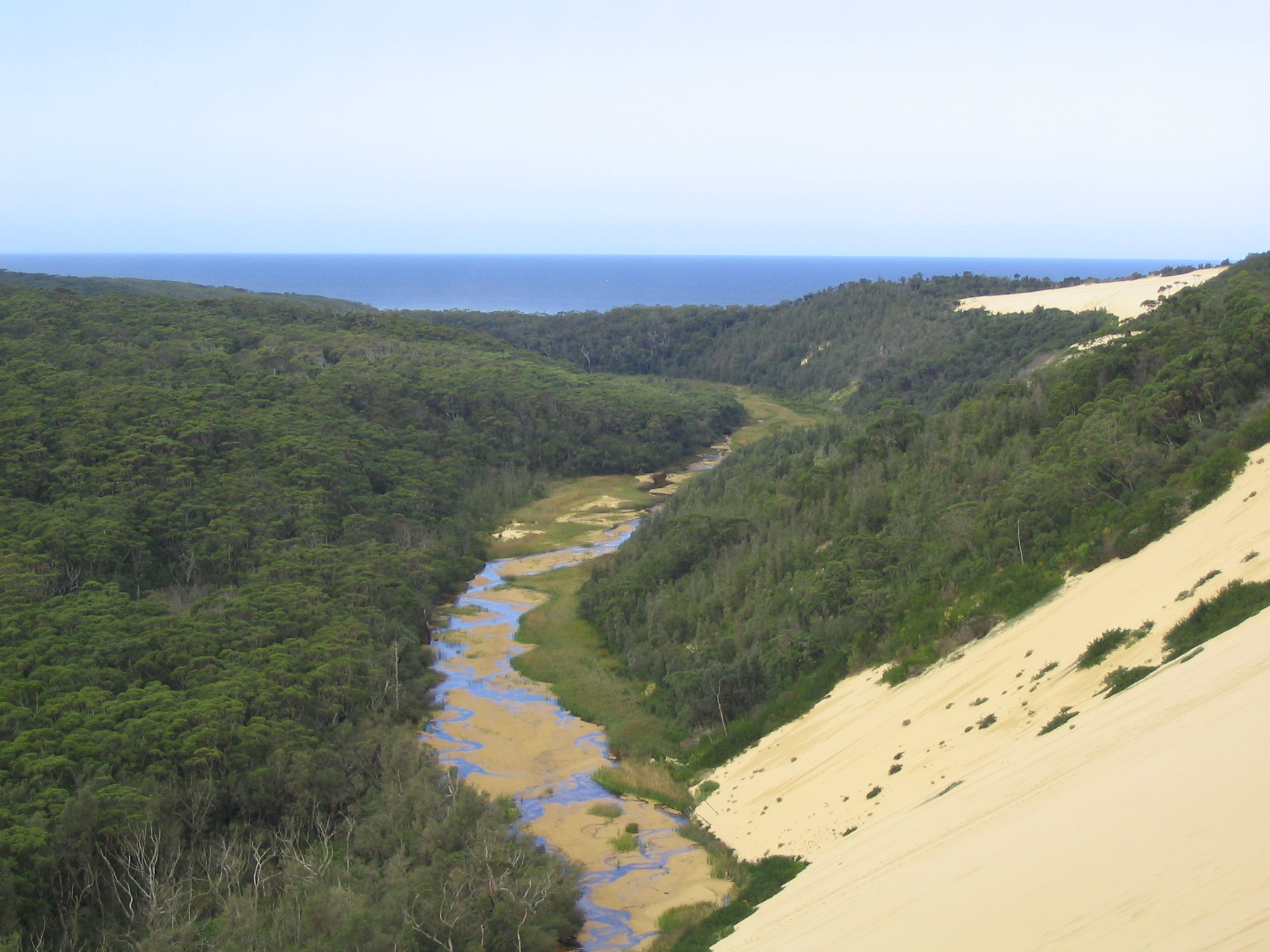
Sand dunes in Croajingolong National Park

The County of Croajingolong is one of the 37 counties of Victoria which are part of the cadastral divisions of Australia, used for land titles. It is the most easterly county, and includes the Croajingolong National Park. Its western boundary is the Snowy River. The county was proclaimed in 1871 together with others from the Gipps Land District. Some time earlier maps showed proposed counties of Howe and Combermere occupying the area of Croajingolong.

== Parishes ==
Parishes include:

- Baawang, Victoria
- Barga, Victoria
- Bemm, Victoria
- Bendock, Victoria
- Betka, Victoria
- Bidwell, Victoria
- Bonang, Victoria
- Bondi, Victoria
- Boorpuk, Victoria
- Bralak, Victoria
- Brindat, Victoria
- Bullamalk, Victoria
- Bungywarr, Victoria
- Cabanandra, Victoria
- Cobon, Victoria
- Combienbar, Victoria
- Cooaggalah, Victoria
- Coopracambra, Victoria
- Curlip, Victoria
- Deddick, Victoria
- Dellicknora, Victoria
- Derndang, Victoria
- Errinundra, Victoria
- Gabo, Victoria
- Goolengook, Victoria
- Goongerah, Victoria
- Jilwain, Victoria
- Jingallala, Victoria
- Jirrah, Victoria
- Karlo, Victoria
- Kirkenong, Victoria
- Koola, Victoria
- Kooragan, Victoria
- Kowat, Victoria
- Kuark, Victoria
- Loomat, Victoria
- Loongelaat, Victoria
- Mallacoota, Victoria
- Maramingo, Victoria
- Moonkan, Victoria
- Murrungowar, Victoria
- Nerran, Victoria
- Noonga, Victoria
- Noorinbee, Victoria
- Nungal, Victoria
- Orbost, Victoria
- Orbost East, Victoria
- Pinnak, Victoria
- Purgagoolah, Victoria
- Tabbara, Victoria
- Tamboon, Victoria
- Thurra, Victoria
- Tingaringy, Victoria
- Tonghi, Victoria
- Toonyarak, Victoria
- Tubbut, Victoria
- Wangarabell, Victoria
- Wat Wat, Victoria
- Wau Wauka, Victoria
- Wau Wauka West, Victoria
- Weeragua, Victoria
- Wibenduck, Victoria
- Wingan, Victoria
- Winyar, Victoria
- Wooyoot, Victoria
- Wurrin, Victoria
- Wyangil, Victoria
- Yalmy, Victoria
- Yarak, Victoria
