= Central Division (New South Wales) =

Division of New South Wales, Australia

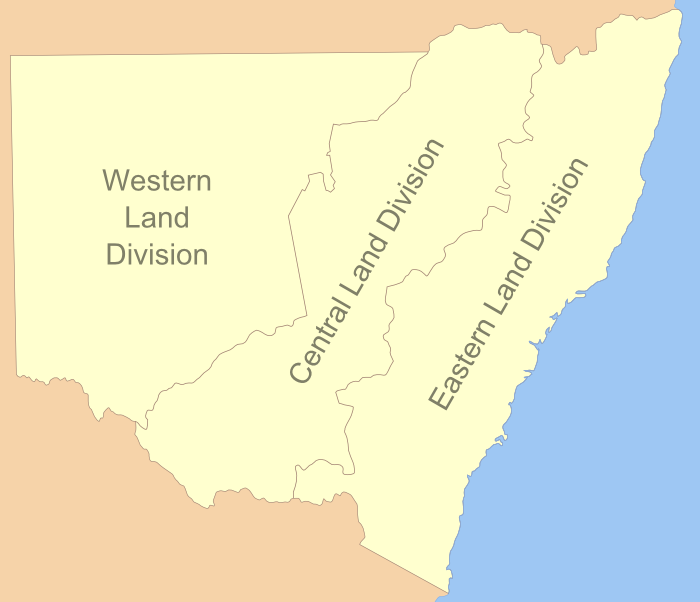
The three land divisions

The Central Division of New South Wales is one of the three divisions of New South Wales along with the Eastern and Western divisions, established under the Crown Lands Act of 1884 for the purposes of land management. In 1907, it included the Hay, Forbes and Moree land boards, as well as the western parts of the Wagga Wagga, Dubbo and Tamworth land boards. Part of its western boundary is the Lachlan River, and it includes a large part of the Riverina. Shires it included were parts of the Narrabri Shire, Goulburn Mulwaree Council, Walgett Shire, Cobar Shire and almost the entire Lachlan Shire, Bland Shire and the Bogan Shire. The Bogan Shire and the Bland Shire are the most west parts of the division.
