= Dampier County =

Dampier New South Wales
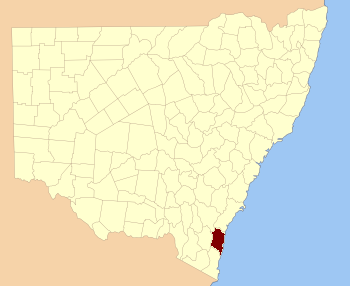
- Location in New South Wales
Lands administrative divisions around Dampier:
Murray	St. Vincent	Pacific Ocean
Beresford	Dampier	Pacific Ocean
Auckland	Auckland	Pacific Ocean

Dampier County is one of the 141 cadastral divisions of New South Wales. The Deua River is the northern boundary, with land slightly to the north of the Brogo River the southern boundary. It includes Bermagui, Narooma, Bodalla, and most of the Deua National Park and Wadbilliga National Park.

Dampier County was named in honour of seaman William Dampier (1651–1715).

== Parishes within this county ==
A full list of parishes found within this county; their current LGA and mapping coordinates to the approximate centre of each location is as follows:

Parish	LGA	Coordinates
Badja	Eurobodalla Shire	36°03′54″S 149°36′04″E
Belowra	Eurobodalla Shire	36°08′54″S 149°43′04″E
Bergalia	Eurobodalla Shire	35°58′54″S 150°02′04″E
Bermagui	Bega Valley Shire	36°24′54″S 150°00′04″E
Bodalla	Eurobodalla Shire	36°06′54″S 150°04′04″E
Bumbo	Eurobodalla Shire	36°03′54″S 150°00′04″E
Bumbo West	Eurobodalla Shire	36°00′54″S 149°51′04″E
Burra	Eurobodalla Shire	35°53′54″S 149°57′04″E
Cadgee	Eurobodalla Shire	36°10′54″S 149°51′04″E
Cadjangarry	Bega Valley Shire	36°27′54″S 149°56′04″E
Congo	Eurobodalla Shire	35°58′54″S 150°07′04″E
Coondella	Eurobodalla Shire	35°57′54″S 149°48′04″E
Countegany	Snowy Monaro Regional Council	36°18′54″S 149°35′04″E
Curmulee	Eurobodalla Shire	35°49′54″S 149°45′04″E
Currambene	Queanbeyan-Palerang Regional Council	35°56′54″S 149°34′04″E
Deua	Eurobodalla Shire	35°53′54″S 149°49′04″E
Dolondundale	Snowy Monaro Regional Council	36°18′54″S 149°28′04″E
Donovan	Eurobodalla Shire	35°49′54″S 149°56′04″E
Eurobodalla	Eurobodalla Shire	36°12′54″S 149°55′04″E
Guinea	Snowy Monaro Regional Council	36°11′54″S 149°32′04″E
Gulph	Eurobodalla Shire	36°04′54″S 149°51′04″E
Jillaga	Queanbeyan-Palerang Regional Council	36°00′54″S 149°38′04″E
Jinden	Snowy Monaro Regional Council	35°51′54″S 149°33′04″E
Merricumbene	Eurobodalla Shire	35°45′54″S 149°51′04″E
Moruya	Eurobodalla Shire	35°55′54″S 150°06′04″E
Murrabrine	Bega Valley Shire	36°25′54″S 149°49′04″E
Murrah	Bega Valley Shire	36°31′54″S 150°00′04″E
Narira	Bega Valley Shire	36°23′54″S 149°54′04″E
Narooma	Eurobodalla Shire	36°14′54″S 150°04′04″E
Nerrigundah	Eurobodalla Shire	36°06′54″S 150°00′04″E
Shoalhaven	Queanbeyan-Palerang Regional Council	35°55′54″S 149°38′04″E
Tanja	Bega Valley Shire	36°35′54″S 150°00′04″E
Uranbene	Eurobodalla Shire	35°58′54″S 149°43′04″E
Wadbilliga	Bega Valley Shire	36°11′54″S 149°36′04″E
Wadbilliga West	Bega Valley Shire	36°14′09″S 149°35′27″E
Wagonga	Eurobodalla Shire	36°11′54″S 150°05′04″E
Wamban	Eurobodalla Shire	35°57′54″S 149°57′04″E
Wandella	Bega Valley Shire	36°17′54″S 149°52′04″E
Wapengo	Bega Valley Shire	36°33′54″S 149°55′04″E
Wyanbene	Eurobodalla Shire	35°46′54″S 149°44′04″E
Yowrie	Bega Valley Shire	36°19′54″S 149°45′04″E
