= Lands administrative divisions of New South Wales =

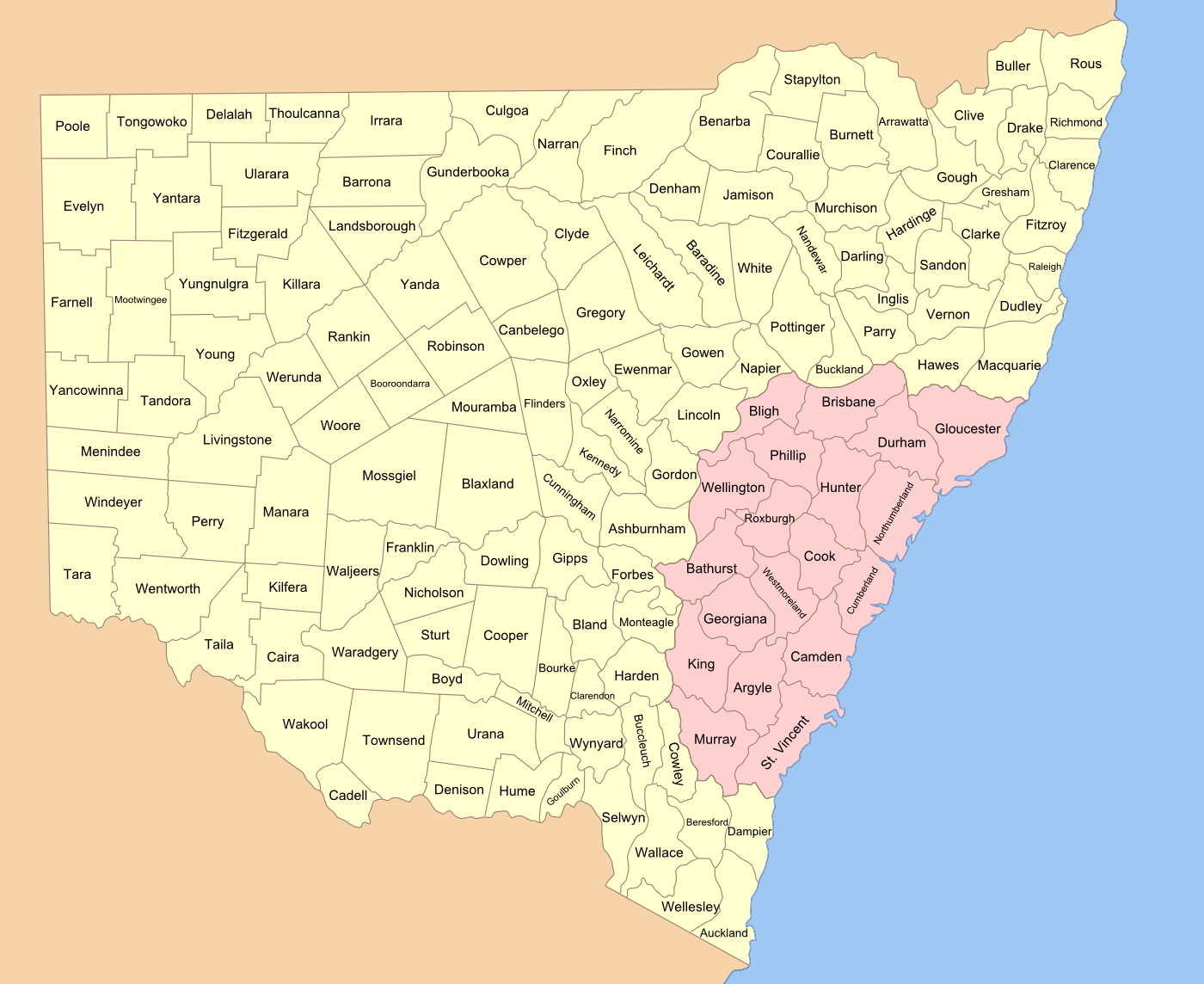
The 141 counties of New South Wales, with the original Nineteen shown in pink

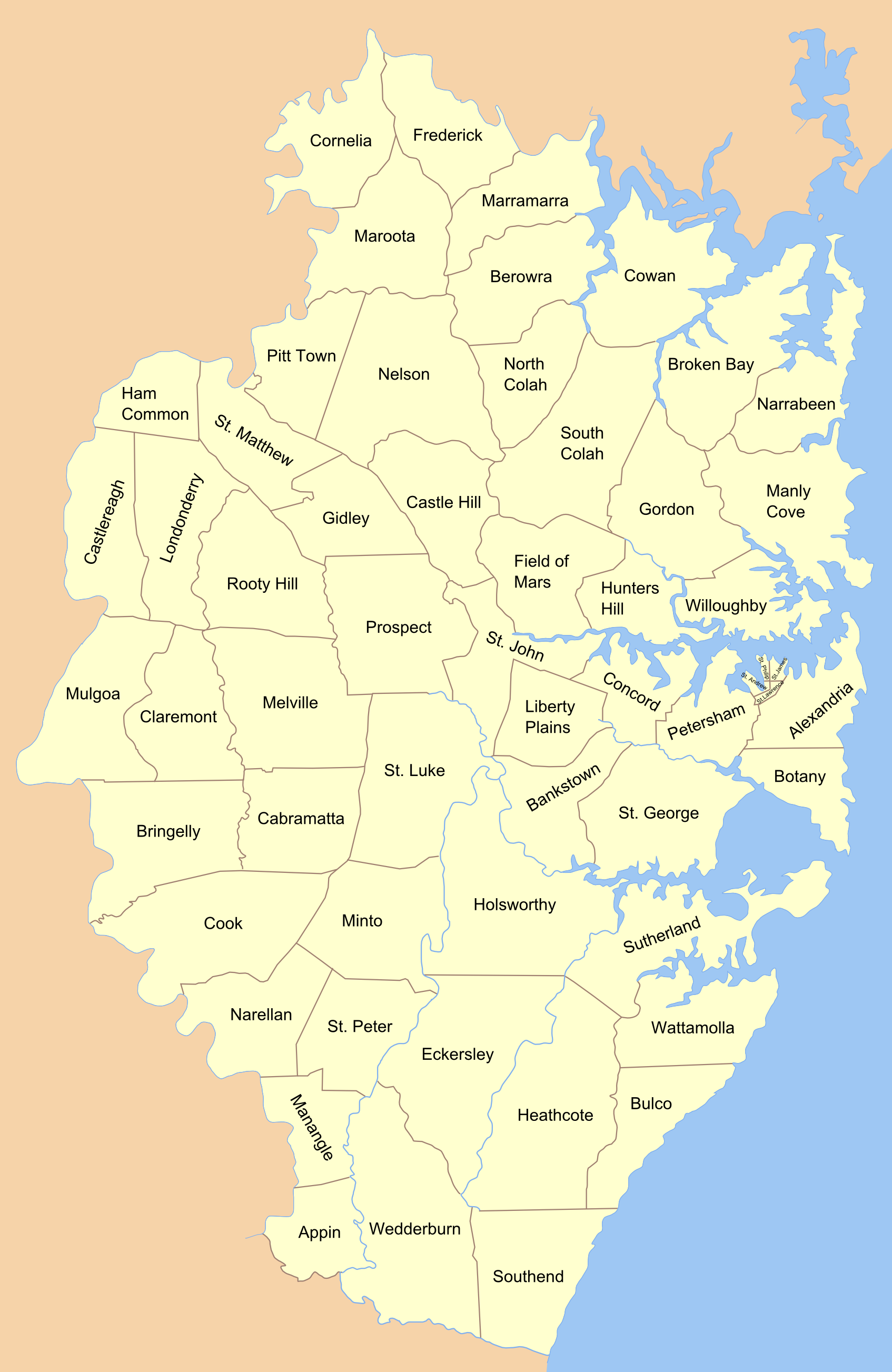
The parishes of Cumberland County

For lands administration purposes, New South Wales is divided into 141 counties, which are further divided into parishes. The counties were first set down in the Colony of New South Wales, which later became the Australian state of New South Wales. Note that counties should not be confused with county councils, which are local governments whose territories are known as county districts; the county councils and county districts usually have distinct names from the counties, and even on those rare occasions when they share the name with a county (see the present Rous County Council and the former Cumberland County Council), they are legally distinct and cover non-identical (albeit generally overlapping) territories.

The counties were further subdivided into 7,419 parishes. There are also three land divisions, approximately one hundred land districts and several other district types. Land boards were used at various periods. Thirteen hundreds were briefly proclaimed in Cumberland County.

These divisions are part of the lands administrative divisions of Australia. Unlike the local government areas of New South Wales, which have gone through restructuring periods by the government, the counties have been the same since the 19th century.

== Creation of county areas ==
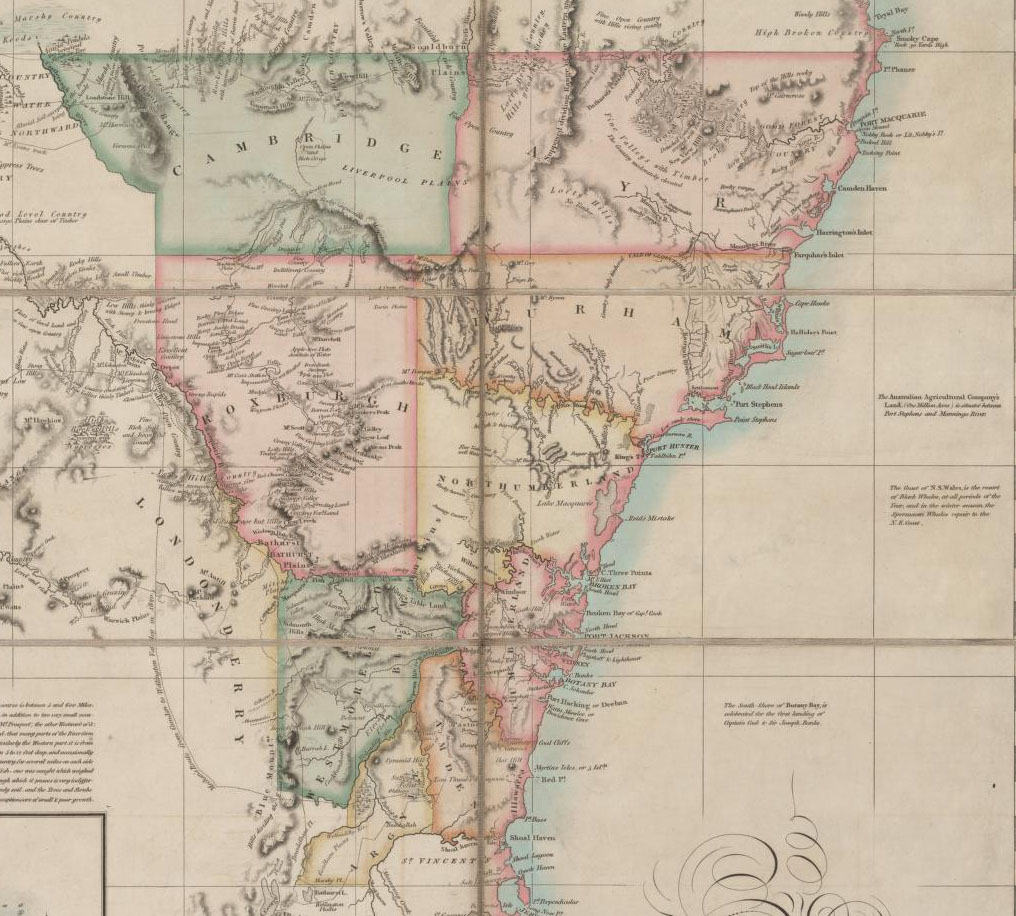
1832 map showing the nine counties in use before Thomas Mitchell surveyed the Nineteen Counties in 1834

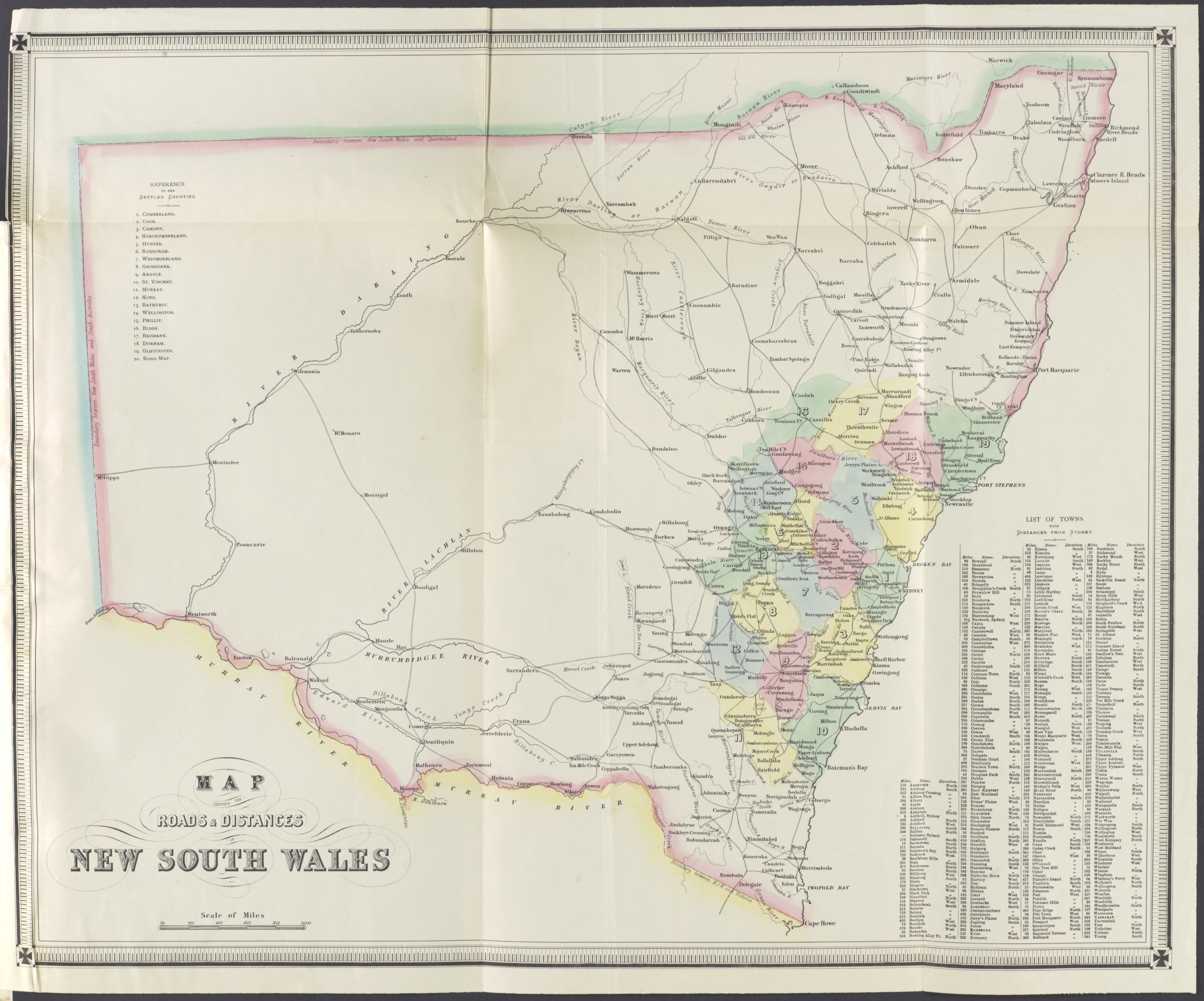
1872 map showing the 19 populated counties

The first county proclaimed was Cumberland on 4 June 1788. Northumberland was named in 1804. Several other counties were established around Sydney; by the 1820s there were nine counties (see 1828 and 1832 maps). They were: Roxburgh, Northumberland, Durham, Westmoreland, Cumberland, Argyle, Camden, Ayr and Cambridge. They were in the approximate area of the present day cadastral units except that some of them were larger and took up land which was in 1834 assigned to other counties. Ayr and Cambridge were not used in the 1834 counties, taking up area which is approximately in what became Macquarie County and Brisbane County.

Instructions were given to Governor Brisbane in 1825 to survey New South Wales and divide it into counties of various sizes, hundreds, and parishes between 15 and 25 square miles (40 and 65 km^{2}). The Nineteen Counties were surveyed by Thomas Mitchell in 1834. In Cumberland County only, 13 hundreds were proclaimed, then repealed in 1888.

As the counties are based on area, rather than population, there are huge differences in the populations of the coastal counties with those for the remote west. The whole of Sydney with several million people is located within Cumberland County, while there are many counties for areas in the Far West which have a very low population.

== Use ==
The counties have little official function and are only now used for land titles and geographic surveying, and as an area of coverage within some industrial awards. Yancowinna County is also legally the only part of the state in the South Australian time zone.

Genealogy records from the 19th and early 20th centuries for New South Wales commonly use the town name followed by the county. The 1911 Britannica lists all towns in New South Wales the same way, such as Albury, Goulburn county, Broken Hill, Yancowinna county and Wagga-Wagga, Wynyard county.

== Early land districts ==
Parts of the land which were outside the Nineteen Counties were divided into squatting districts in the early 19th century . In 1846 New South Wales was divided into settled districts, intermediate districts and unsettled districts. In 1861 the system of settled and unsettled districts were abolished with the Crown Lands Acts, while new types of districts called first and second class settled districts, as well as town land and suburban land came into being. The various districts used:

- Albert District (west of the Darling River). Erected 4 November 1851. Warrego District was split off in 1862.
- Bligh District, east of the Macquarie River. Erected 22 May 1839. (1841 population of 402, with 118,341 sheep and 24,064 cattle) In 1852, it was described as being 5 million acres (20,000 km^{2}), with 140,000 sheep, 40,000 cattle and 2,000 horses.
- Clarence River District. Erected 1 March 1842, from Port Macquarie District. In 1852, it was described as being 5 million acres (20,000 km^{2}), with 200,000 sheep, 40,000 cattle and 2,000 horses.
- Gwydir District (Moree area). Erected 4 Dec 1847, subdivided from Liverpool Plains district.
- Lachlan District – between the Lachlan River and Murrumbidgee River. Erected 22 May 1839. (1841 population of 792, with 111,154 sheep and 57,920 cattle)
- Liverpool Plains District. Erected 22 May 1839; Gwydir was split off in 1847. (1841 population of 1012, with 230,102 sheep, 102,738 cattle and 1045 horses) In 1852, it was described as being larger than 10 million acres (40,000 km^{2}), with 400,000 sheep, 220,000 cattle and 4,000 horses. There was an Electoral district of Liverpool Plains in the same area in the 19th century, and the Liverpool Plains Shire is the modern shire.
- Lower Darling District (east of the Darling River). Erected 4 December 1847; later called simply Darling.
- Maneroo District (south coast, now called Monaro) - south of the Moruya River and Queanbeyan River, and east of the Murrumbidgee River. Erected 22 May 1839 (1841 population of 1554, with 230,130 sheep, 78,473 cattle and 2133 horses). In 1852, it was described as having 400,000 sheep, 115,000 cattle and 5,000 horses.
- Macleay River District. Erected 1 March 1842 from out of Port Macquarie District.
- Murrumbidgee District (between the Murrumbidgee and Murray rivers). Erected 22 May 1839. (1841 population of 1139, with 180,654 sheep and 62,848 cattle) In 1852, it was described as being 12 million acres (49,000 km^{2}), with 400,000 sheep, 100,000 cattle and 3,000 horses.
- New England District. Erected 22 May 1839. (New England region (1841 population of 702 with 201,926 sheep and 13,830 cattle)
- Port Macquarie District. (1841 population of 287, with 11,642 sheep and 5,885 cattle). Erected 22 May 1839. Subdivided into Clarence and Macleay in 1842.
- Warrego District (between Darling River and Queensland border in the north). Erected 8 August 1862, from out of Albert District.
- Wellington District, between the Lachlan River and Macquarie River. Erected 22 May 1839. (1841 population of 656, with 119,441 sheep and 26,370 cattle)

== Land divisions, boards and districts ==
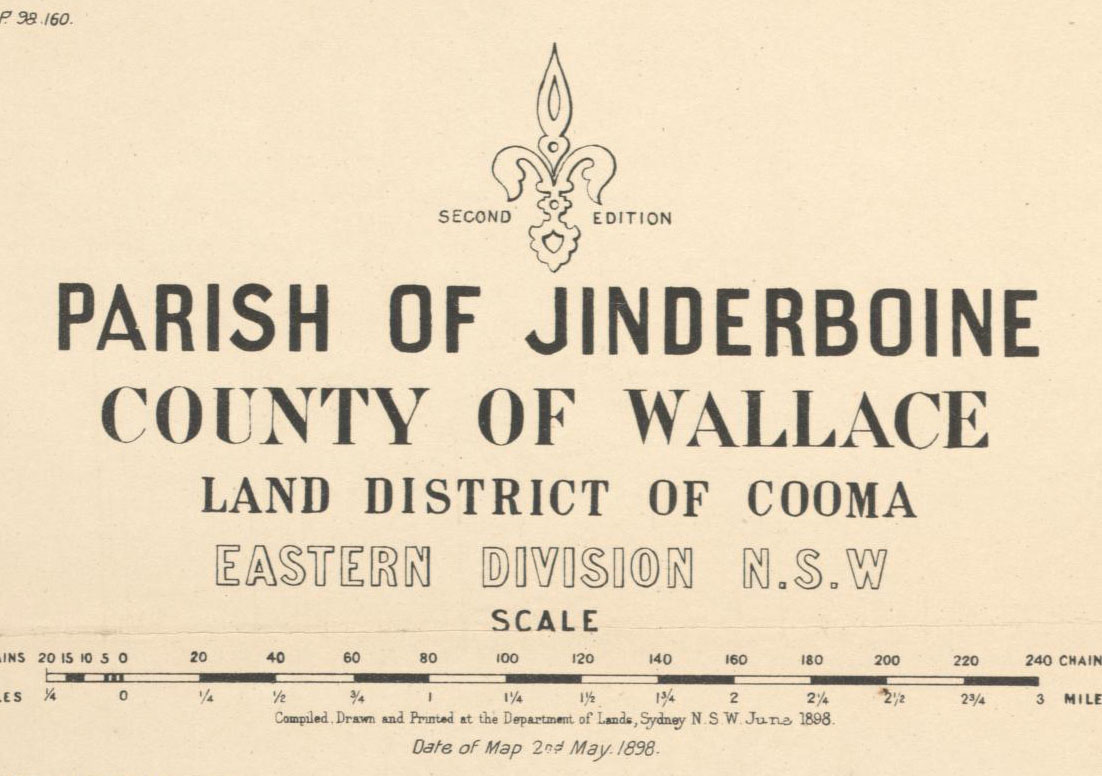
The key from a typical cadastral map from the 1890s showed four types of subdivisions; the parish, county, land district and land division. This one is located in the County of Wallace

The Crown Lands Act of 1884 further divided New South Wales into three land divisions; Western, Central and Eastern; as well as Land Boards and Land Districts. This 1890 map shows 14 land boards and 95 land districts; while a 1907 map shows 13 land boards and 103 land districts. The new land districts were different from the previous land districts which had mostly been used in the western areas of the state before counties were proclaimed there. The land boards were named after the location of the head office. The table below shows the land districts used in 1890 and 1907 (some of the locations of the land boards changed and there were new land districts), with the land boards and land divisions:

Land District	Land Board (1890)	Land Board (1907)	Land Division
Albury	Wagga Wagga	Wagga Wagga	Eastern
Armidale	Armidale	Armidale	Eastern
Balranald South	Hay	Hay	Central
Balranald	Hay	Western	Western
Barmedman East		Forbes	Central
Barmedman		Forbes	Central
Bathurst	Orange	Orange	Eastern
Bega	Cooma	Goulburn	Eastern
Bellingen		Grafton	Eastern
Berrima	Sydney	Eastern	Eastern
Bingara	Moree	Moree	Central
Bombala	Cooma	Goulburn	Eastern
Boorowa	Goulburn	Goulburn	Eastern
Bourke	Bourke	Western	Western
Braidwood	Goulburn	Goulburn	Eastern
Breewarrina	Bourke	Western	Western
Breewarrina East	Bourke		Central
Campbelltown	Sydney		Eastern
Carcoar	Orange	Orange	Eastern
Casino	Grafton	Grafton	Eastern
Cassillis	Maitland		Eastern
Cobar	Bourke	Western	Western
Cobar East	Bourke		Central
Condobolin	Forbes	Forbes	Central
Cooma	Cooma	Goulburn	Eastern
Coonabarabran	Tamworth	Tamworth	Central
Coonamble	Dubbo	Dubbo	Eastern
Cootamundry	Wagga Wagga	Wagga Wagga	Eastern
Cootamundry Central		Wagga Wagga	Eastern
Corowa	Wagga Wagga	Wagga Wagga	Central
Cowra	Orange	Orange	Eastern
Deniliquin	Hay	Hay	Central
Dubbo	Dubbo	Dubbo	Eastern
Dungog	Maitland	Maitland	Eastern
Eden	Cooma	Goulburn	Eastern
Forbes	Forbes	Forbes	Central
Glen Innes	Armidale	Armidale	Eastern
Gosford	Sydney	Maitland	Eastern
Goulburn	Goulburn	Goulburn	Eastern
Grafton	Grafton	Grafton	Eastern
Grenfell	Forbes	Forbes	Central
Gundagai	Wagga Wagga	Wagga Wagga	Eastern
Gunnedah	Tamworth	Tamworth	Central
Gunning	Goulburn	Goulburn	Eastern
Hay North	Hay	Western	Western
Hay	Hay	Hay	Central
Hillston North	Hay	Western	Western
Hillston	Hay	Hay	Central
Inverell	Armidale	Armidale	Eastern
Kempsey	Grafton	Grafton	Eastern
Kiama	Sydney	Sydney	Eastern
Lismore	Grafton	Grafton	Eastern
Lithgow	Sydney	Orange	Eastern
Liverpool	Sydney		Eastern
Maitland	Maitland	Maitland	Eastern
Metropolitan	Sydney	Sydney	Eastern
Milton	Sydney	Sydney	Eastern
Molong	Orange	Orange	Eastern
Moree	Moree	Moree	Central
Moruya	Sydney		Eastern
Mudgee	Orange	Orange	Eastern
Murrurundi	Tamworth	Tamworth	Eastern
Murwillumbah	Grafton	Grafton	Eastern
Muswellbrook	Maitland	Maitland	Eastern
Narrabri	Tamworth	Moree	Central
Narrandera	Wagga Wagga	Hay	Central
Newcastle	Maitland	Maitland	Eastern
Nowra	Sydney	Sydney	Eastern
Nyngan		Dubbo	Eastern
Orange	Orange	Orange	Eastern
Parkes	Forbes	Forbes	Central
Parramatta	Sydney	Sydney	Eastern
Paterson	Maitland		Eastern
Penrith	Sydney	Sydney	Eastern
Picton	Sydney	Sydney	Eastern
Port Macquarie	Maitland	Grafton	Eastern
Queanbeyan	Cooma	Goulburn	Eastern
Raymonod Terrace	Maitland		Eastern
Rylstone	Orange	Orange	Eastern
Scone	Maitland	Maitland	Eastern
Singleton	Maitland	Maitland	Eastern
Stroud	Maitland	Maitland	Eastern
Tamworth	Tamworth	Tamworth	Eastern
Taree	Maitland	Maitland	Eastern
Tenterfield	Armidale	Armidale	Eastern
Tumbarumba North		Wagga Wagga	Eastern
Tumbarumba		Wagga Wagga	Eastern
Tumut	Wagga Wagga	Wagga Wagga	Eastern
Urana	Wagga Wagga	Wagga Wagga	Central
Wagga Wagga	Wagga Wagga	Wagga Wagga	Central
Walcha	Armidale	Armidale	Eastern
Walgett North	Moree	Western	Western
Walgett	Moree	Moree	Central
Warialda	Moree	Moree	Central
Warren		Dubbo	Eastern
Wellington	Orange	Orange	Eastern
Wentworth	Hay	Western	Western
Wilcannia	Bourke	Western	Western
Windsor	Sydney	Sydney	Eastern
Wollombi	Maitland		Eastern
Wollongong	Sydney	Sydney	Eastern
Wyalong		Forbes	Central
Yass	Goulburn	Goulburn	Eastern
Young	Goulburn	Wagga Wagga	Eastern

== Table of counties ==
County	Year of erection	number of parishes	Coordinates
Argyle	1821	50	34°46′41″S 149°45′21″E
Arrawatta	1862	70	29°21′2″S 151°3′53″E
Ashburnham	1850	60	33°16′12″S 148°26′9″E
Auckland	1843	55	36°54′42″S 149°41′20″E
Baradine	1862	78	30°38′35″S 148°54′11″E
Barrona	1884	28	29°59′33″S 144°49′2″E
Bathurst	1829	67	33°35′8″S 149°7′45″E
Benarba	1862	102	29°14′28″S 149°12′45″E
Beresford	1848	49	36°5′18″S 149°14′11″E
Bland	1862	65	34°9′7″S 147°39′14″E
Blaxland	1862	92	32°50′3″S 146°1′39″E
Bligh	1829	47	32°6′46″S 149°42′26″E
Booroondarra	1884	36	31°48′7″S 145°5′44″E
Bourke	1862	55	34°32′19″S 147°4′54″E
Boyd	1862	39	34°41′31″S 145°44′27″E
Brisbane	1829	58	32°2′33″S 150°41′1″E
Buccleuch	1848	35	35°18′21″S 148°25′13″E
Buckland	1848	33	31°25′23″S 150°34′51″E
Buller	1850	45	28°38′4″S 152°23′20″E
Burnett	1862	56	29°21′52″S 150°30′56″E
Cadell	1862	28	35°49′29″S 144°36′39″E
Caira	1862	80	34°29′15″S 143°44′24″E
Camden	1805	55	34°28′10″S 150°30′6″E
Canbelego	1875	52	31°16′16″S 146°41′27″E
Clarence	1848	40	29°35′33″S 153°4′57″E
Clarendon	1850	36	34°52′42″S 147°39′40″E
Clarke	1862	51	30°19′15″S 152°5′27″E
Clive	1850	54	29°11′29″S 151°56′12″E
Clyde	1862	80	30°22′37″S 147°10′41″E
Cook	1829	45	33°30′53″S 150°24′32″E
Cooper	1862	76	34°15′28″S 146°25′53″E
Courallie	1862	54	29°37′11″S 149°53′20″E
Cowley	1848	23	35°26′20″S 148°48′38″E
Cowper	1862	117	30°34′23″S 146°17′54″E
Culgoa	1884	46	29°14′57″S 146°23′50″E
Cumberland	1788	57	33°48′54″S 150°57′59″E
Cunningham	1862	59	32°56′3″S 147°15′6″E
Dampier	1848	41	36°7′47″S 149°49′57″E
Darling	1850	36	30°35′17″S 150°42′11″E
Delalah	1884	23	29°16′45″S 143°10′7″E
Denham	1862	44	29°56′2″S 148°33′22″E
Denison	1862	31	35°34′35″S 145°51′21″E
Dowling	1862	51	33°27′22″S 146°22′18″E
Drake	1850	39	29°11′51″S 152°31′41″E
Dudley	1848	37	30°54′2″S 152°35′23″E
Durham	1829	63	32°19′30″S 151°17′59″E
Evelyn	1884	41	30°4′37″S 141°32′55″E
Ewenmar	1862	53	31°40′59″S 148°18′50″E
Farnell	1884	34	31°4′23″S 141°21′18″E
Finch	1875	120	29°31′6″S 148°4′2″E
Fitzgerald	1884	31	30°22′18″S 143°37′35″E
Fitzroy	1862	46	30°5′18″S 152°46′56″E
Flinders	1862	71	31°57′51″S 146°48′33″E
Forbes	1862	38	33°42′5″S 148°14′10″E
Franklin	1862	44	33°25′25″S 145°12′3″E
Georgiana	1829	59	34°1′42″S 149°29′6″E
Gipps	1862	71	33°30′57″S 147°12′45″E
Gloucester	1829	79	32°15′3″S 151°59′38″E
Gordon	1850	39	32°39′37″S 148°39′2″E
Gough	1862	63	29°38′30″S 151°39′0″E
Goulburn	1850	38	35°46′21″S 147°17′9″E
Gowen	1850	51	31°28′54″S 148°59′55″E
Gregory	1862	91	31°7′26″S 147°36′11″E
Gresham	1850	33	29°49′14″S 152°24′11″E
Gunderbooka	1875	45	29°51′35″S 145°53′17″E
Harden	1850	42	34°40′34″S 148°16′43″E
Hardinge	1862	45	30°11′51″S 151°12′52″E
Hawes	1848	39	31°33′16″S 151°44′8″E
Hume	1862	43	35°42′16″S 146°39′40″E
Hunter	1829	64	32°52′35″S 150°38′53″E
Inglis	1850	22	30°53′59″S 151°3′38″E
Irrara	1884	47	29°22′21″S 145°2′40″E
Jamison	1862	64	30°2′14″S 149°24′15″E
Kennedy	1862	61	32°34′20″S 147°35′17″E
Kilfera	1884	15	33°50′32″S 143°42′4″E
Killara	1875	53	30°53′50″S 144°1′36″E
King	1829	48	34°30′50″S 149°3′59″E
Landsborough	1875	25	30°24′44″S 144°46′26″E
Leichhardt	1862	105	30°41′54″S 148°17′48″E
Lincoln	1850	52	32°8′20″S 148°58′55″E
Livingstone	1862	54	32°19′38″S 143°5′3″E
Macquarie	1830	62	31°31′1″S 152°30′47″E
Manara	1884	43	33°6′55″S 143°49′9″E
Menindee	1862	29	32°30′27″S 141°45′53″E
Mitchell	1862	40	35°9′31″S 146°57′11″E
Monteagle	1850	35	34°9′23″S 148°24′22″E
Mootwingee	1884	39	30°59′2″S 142°4′36″E
Mossgiel	1884	87	32°46′55″S 144°55′34″E
Mouramba	1884	64	32°4′39″S 146°1′16″E
Murchison	1862	48	29°59′19″S 150°34′20″E
Murray	1829	54	35°18′20″S 149°17′40″E
Nandewar	1862	33	30°32′44″S 150°10′28″E
Napier	1850	29	31°39′35″S 149°33′12″E
Narran	1875	97	29°29′51″S 147°10′51″E
Narromine	1862	46	32°16′44″S 148°1′16″E
Nicholson	1862	70	33°46′0″S 145°33′6″E
Northumberland	1804	68	33°0′13″S 151°15′39″E
Oxley	1862	43	31°46′43″S 147°29′57″E
Parry	1848	35	31°14′2″S 151°2′19″E
Perry	1862	58	33°8′12″S 142°50′18″E
Phillip	1829	45	32°31′21″S 149°57′6″E
Poole	1884	12	29°22′5″S 141°20′7″E
Pottinger	1850	64	31°13′23″S 150°1′30″E
Raleigh	1848	31	30°35′17″S 152°46′46″E
Rankin	1875	36	31°18′27″S 144°35′27″E
Richmond	1848	36	29°4′31″S 153°4′36″E
Robinson	1884	46	31°24′2″S 145°46′48″E
Rous	1848	74	28°36′46″S 153°12′27″E
Roxburgh	1829	48	33°9′22″S 149°49′39″E
Sandon	1850	44	30°33′4″S 151°41′4″E
Selwyn	1862	48	36°0′21″S 148°9′17″E
St Vincent	1829	76	35°19′44″S 150°10′21″E
Stapylton	1862	57	29°0′8″S 150°5′59″E
Sturt	1862	42	34°13′53″S 145°39′17″E
Taila	1862	42	34°18′50″S 142°54′21″E
Tandora	1884	27	31°58′31″S 142°20′37″E
Tara	1862	54	33°39′52″S 141°25′32″E
Thoulcanna	1884	19	29°17′52″S 144°5′32″E
Tongowoko	1884	20	29°18′19″S 142°15′42″E
Townsend	1862	111	35°17′23″S 145°0′23″E
Ularara	1884	29	29°49′31″S 143°38′3″E
Urana	1862	73	35°14′53″S 146°9′42″E
Vernon	1848	44	31°4′29″S 151°48′14″E
Wakool	1862	98	35°9′0″S 143°59′38″E
Waljeers	1862	60	33°42′5″S 144°30′1″E
Wallace	1848	65	36°16′20″S 148°40′27″E
Waradgery	1862	83	34°28′25″S 144°40′55″E
Wellesley	1848	49	36°46′53″S 149°1′52″E
Wellington	1829	59	32°50′50″S 149°16′1″E
Wentworth	1862	71	33°47′41″S 142°21′48″E
Werunda	1875	33	31°44′23″S 143°51′51″E
Westmoreland	1814	46	33°49′12″S 149°59′13″E
White	1862	47	30°44′0″S 149°22′45″E
Windeyer	1862	47	33°2′49″S 141°52′7″E
Woore	1884	32	32°12′12″S 144°25′39″E
Wynyard	1850	53	35°20′19″S 147°50′5″E
Yancowinna	1884	50	31°54′35″S 141°27′55″E
Yanda	1875	55	30°52′32″S 145°25′4″E
Yantara	1884	33	29°58′33″S 142°31′6″E
Young	1875	58	31°30′35″S 143°1′4″E
Yungnulgra	1884	39	30°52′59″S 142°57′31″E

== See also ==
- Land and Valuation Court of New South Wales
- Lands administrative divisions of Australia
