= Western Division (New South Wales) =

Division of New South Wales, Australia

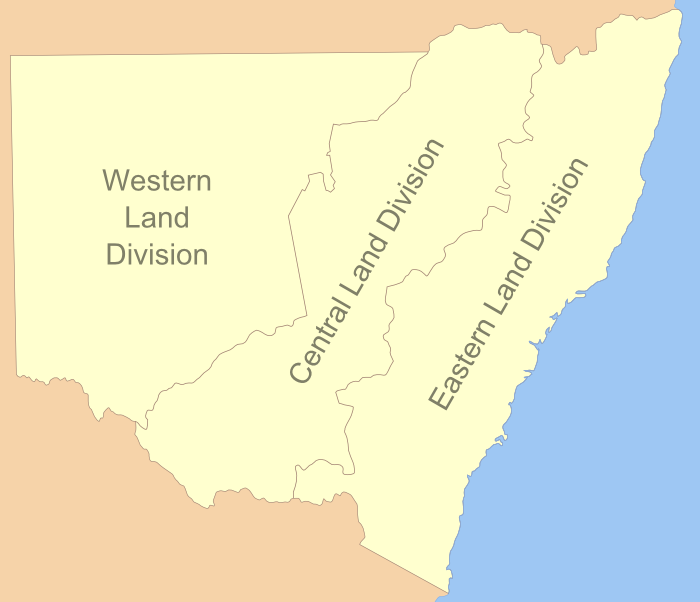
The three land divisions

The state of New South Wales is divided into three divisions: the Eastern Division, the Central Division, and the Western Division. These were established for the purposes of the management of the lease of Crown land to private persons. The Western Division includes Broken Hill, Bourke, Cobar, Cockburn (NSW half), Walgett, Wentworth as well as the western land boards of Forbes, Griffith, Rankins Springs, West Wyalong, White Cliffs, Wyalong, Conargo, Hay and Parkes.

The Western Lands Act 1901 established a Western Lands Board, composed of three commissioners, to issue leases in the Western Division. The Progressive See government appointed Colin James McMasters as chairman on a salary of £1,500 per year and Robert McDonald and Hugh Langwell as commissioners on a salary of £1,000 per year. In 1931 the Lang government appointed a Royal Commission to inquire into the administration of the Western Lands Division, including whether the then commissioners, Hugh Langwell, George Australia Denning and Arthur Willim Mullen were guilty of misbehaviour or incompetence. The commissioner, Ernest Arthur Prior, found that they had been negligent and incompetent, and they were dismissed on the advice of cabinet.

The Western Lands (Amendment Act) 1934 dissolved the Western Lands Board, and appointed a single Western Lands Commissioner in its stead, to carry out the same functions.

Today, the Western Lands Commissioner is part of the Department of Lands.

Most of the land in the Western Division of NSW remains perpetual leasehold; as such, the Western Lands Commissioner retains an active function to this day in the administration of the leases.
