= Wallace County, New South Wales =

Cadastral division in Australia

Wallace
- Cadastral division
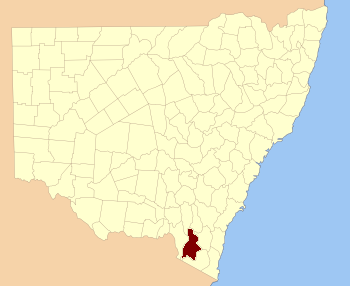
- Location in New South Wales
- Country: Australia
- State: New South Wales
Lands administrative divisions around Wallace
| Buccleuch | Cowley | Beresford |
| Selwyn | Wallace | Beresford |
| Tambo (Vic) | Wellesley | Wellesley |

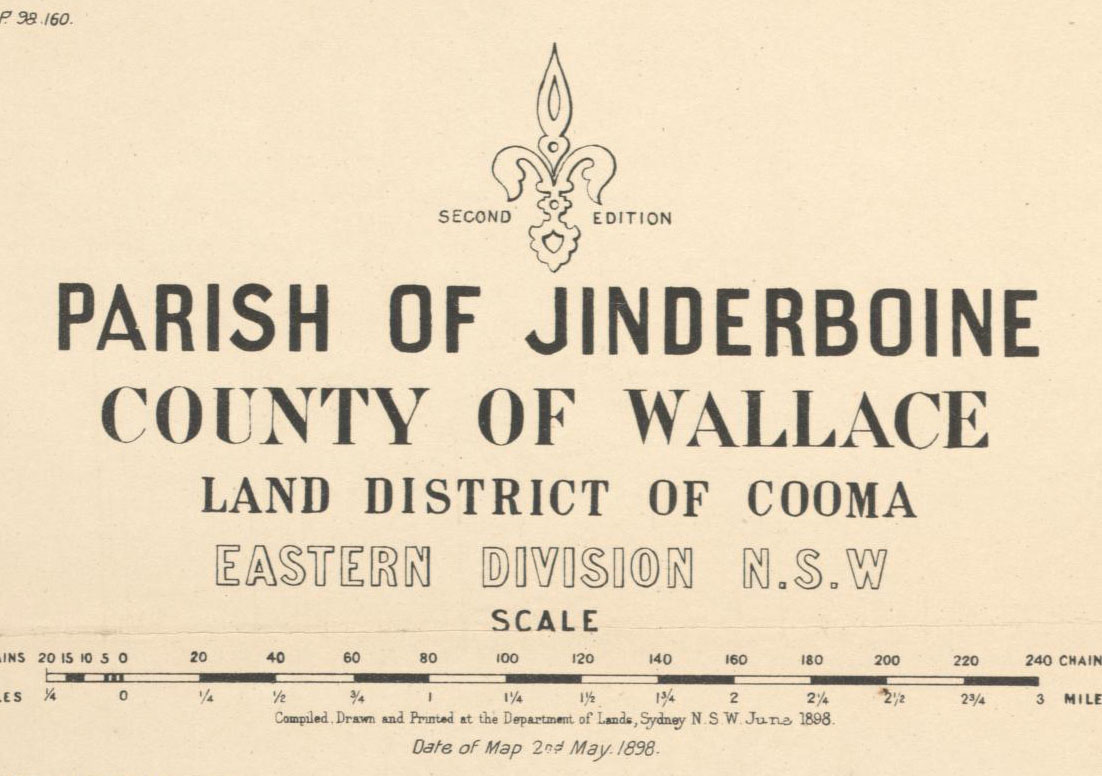
Title of an 1898 map from Wallace County

Wallace County is one of the 141 cadastral divisions of New South Wales. The Snowy River is the boundary to the south and south-east, with the Murrumbidgee River being the northern boundary. It includes the area around Jindabyne.

Wallace County was named in honour of Sir John Alexander Dunlop Agnew Wallace (1775–1857), the Sixth Baronet.

== Parishes within this county ==
A full list of parishes found within this county; their current LGA and mapping coordinates to the approximate centre of each location is as follows:

| Parish | LGA | Coordinates |
|---|---|---|
| Abington | Snowy Monaro Regional Council | 36°28′54″S 148°36′04″E |
| Adaminaby | Snowy Monaro Regional Council | 36°05′54″S 148°49′04″E |
| Adaminiby | Snowy Monaro Regional Council | 36°05′53″S 148°48′34″E |
| Addicumbene | Snowy Monaro Regional Council | 36°02′54″S 148°36′04″E |
| Arable | Snowy Monaro Regional Council | 36°23′54″S 148°58′04″E |
| Backalum | Snowy Monaro Regional Council | 36°02′54″S 148°56′04″E |
| Beloka | Snowy Monaro Regional Council | 36°28′54″S 148°45′04″E |
| Beurina | Snowy Monaro Regional Council | 36°43′54″S 148°15′04″E |
| Blakefield | Snowy Monaro Regional Council | 36°34′54″S 148°30′04″E |
| Bloomfield | Snowy Monaro Regional Council | 36°34′54″S 148°20′04″E |
| Bobundara | Snowy Monaro Regional Council | 36°28′54″S 148°55′04″E |
| Bolaira | Snowy Monaro Regional Council | 35°59′54″S 148°46′04″E |
| Bradley | Snowy Monaro Regional Council | 36°20′54″S 148°56′04″E |
| Buckenderra | Snowy Monaro Regional Council | 36°10′54″S 148°48′04″E |
| Bulgundara | Snowy Monaro Regional Council | 36°26′54″S 148°47′04″E |
| Bullenbalong | Snowy Monaro Regional Council | 36°13′54″S 148°41′04″E |
| Cabramurra | Snowy Monaro Regional Council | 35°59′54″S 148°35′04″E |
| Caddigat | Snowy Monaro Regional Council | 35°59′54″S 148°52′04″E |
| Chippendale | Snowy Monaro Regional Council | 35°55′54″S 148°45′04″E |
| Clapton | Snowy Monaro Regional Council | 36°39′54″S 148°18′04″E |
| Clyde | Snowy Monaro Regional Council | 36°26′54″S 148°35′04″E |
| Coolamatong | Snowy Monaro Regional Council | 36°23′54″S 148°48′04″E |
| Coonhoonbula | Snowy Monaro Regional Council | 36°34′54″S 148°54′04″E |
| Cootralantra | Snowy Monaro Regional Council | 36°18′54″S 148°55′04″E |
| Crackenback | Snowy Monaro Regional Council | 36°25′54″S 148°28′04″E |
| Eucumbene | Snowy Monaro Regional Council | 36°07′54″S 148°36′04″E |
| Gabramatta | Snowy Monaro Regional Council | 35°49′54″S 148°45′04″E |
| Gooandra | Snowy Monaro Regional Council | 35°46′54″S 148°32′04″E |
| Gordon | Snowy Monaro Regional Council | 36°24′54″S 148°52′04″E |
| Grose | Snowy Monaro Regional Council | 36°41′54″S 148°28′04″E |
| Gungarlin | Snowy Valleys Council | 36°09′54″S 148°28′04″E |
| Guthega | Snowy Monaro Regional Council | 36°20′54″S 148°24′04″E |
| Gygederick | Snowy Monaro Regional Council | 36°13′54″S 148°49′04″E |
| Ingebirah | Snowy Monaro Regional Council | 36°36′19″S 148°26′24″E |
| Ingeegoodbee | Snowy Monaro Regional Council | 36°49′54″S 148°20′04″E |
| Jimenbuen | Snowy Monaro Regional Council | 36°41′54″S 148°53′04″E |
| Jinderboine | Snowy Monaro Regional Council | 36°24′54″S 148°42′04″E |
| Kalkite | Snowy Monaro Regional Council | 36°13′54″S 148°35′04″E |
| Kiandra | Snowy Monaro Regional Council | 35°52′54″S 148°30′04″E |
| Kosciusko | Snowy Monaro Regional Council | 36°29′54″S 148°17′04″E |
| Kosciuszko | Snowy Monaro Regional Council | 36°29′54″S 148°17′04″E |
| Lake | Snowy Monaro Regional Council | 36°12′54″S 148°54′04″E |
| Marrinumbla | Snowy Monaro Regional Council | 36°32′54″S 148°49′04″E |
| Matong | Snowy Monaro Regional Council | 36°42′54″S 148°48′04″E |
| Middlingbank | Snowy Monaro Regional Council | 36°11′54″S 148°40′04″E |
| Mitchell | Snowy Monaro Regional Council | 36°20′54″S 148°28′04″E |
| Mowamba | Snowy Monaro Regional Council | 36°28′54″S 148°32′04″E |
| Mowamba | Snowy Monaro Regional Council | 36°31′54″S 148°27′04″E |
| Moyangul | Snowy Monaro Regional Council | 36°43′54″S 148°19′04″E |
| Munyang | Snowy Monaro Regional Council | 36°16′26″S 148°27′38″E |
| Murroo | Snowy Monaro Regional Council | 36°07′54″S 148°56′04″E |
| Myack | Snowy Monaro Regional Council | 36°18′54″S 148°47′04″E |
| Myalla | Snowy Monaro Regional Council | 36°26′54″S 149°01′04″E |
| Napier | Snowy Monaro Regional Council | 36°46′54″S 148°48′04″E |
| Nimmo | Snowy Monaro Regional Council | 36°10′54″S 148°35′04″E |
| Numbla | Snowy Monaro Regional Council | 36°37′54″S 148°46′04″E |
| Nungar | Snowy Monaro Regional Council | 35°54′54″S 148°38′04″E |
| Popong | Snowy Monaro Regional Council | 36°39′54″S 148°40′04″E |
| Seymour | Snowy Monaro Regional Council | 36°04′18″S 148°42′49″E |
| Tantangara | Snowy Monaro Regional Council | 35°48′54″S 148°37′04″E |
| The Peak | Snowy Monaro Regional Council | 36°25′54″S 149°06′04″E |
| Thredbo | Snowy Monaro Regional Council | 31°30′54″S 148°23′04″E |
| Tongaroo | Snowy Monaro Regional Council | 36°43′54″S 148°55′04″E |
| Townsend | Snowy Monaro Regional Council | 36°19′54″S 148°41′04″E |
| Wallgrove | Snowy Monaro Regional Council | 35°59′54″S 148°42′04″E |
| Wambrook | Snowy Monaro Regional Council | 36°10′54″S 148°56′04″E |
| Wilson | Snowy Monaro Regional Council | 36°34′54″S 148°41′04″E |
| Wullwye | Snowy Monaro Regional Council | 36°27′54″S 148°56′04″E |
