= Rowena, New South Wales =

Rowena
- Town
- Coordinates: 29°48′S 148°55′E
- Country: Australia
- State: New South Wales
- LGA: Walgett Shire

Government
  - State electorate: Barwon
  - Federal division: Parkes

Population
  - Total: 172 (2021 census)
- Postcode: 2387

Rowena is a small town in the far northeast of New South Wales, Australia, and lies in the Walgett Shire. It serves an agricultural community which consists of both dry and irrigated cropping as well as grazing. At the 2021 census, Rowena had a population of 172.

A public school, which opened in 1923 and was rebuilt in 1996, serves the district. The Pokataroo railway line passes through the town.

The school has about 30 children with the last name Bartlett (2009). The town has a pub, a general store, and a post office, as well as an oval and a swimming pool.
