= Auckland County =

Auckland
- Cadastral division
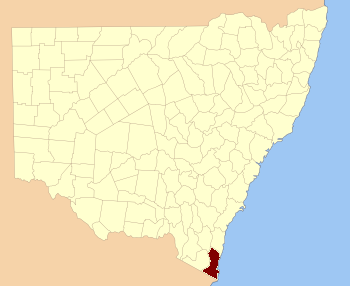
- Location in New South Wales
- Country: Australia
- State: New South Wales
Lands administrative divisions around Auckland
Beresford	Dampier	Pacific Ocean
Wellesley	Auckland	Pacific Ocean
Croajingolong (Vic)	Croajingolong (Vic)	Pacific Ocean

Auckland County is one of the 141 cadastral divisions of New South Wales. It is at the extreme south-east of the state, with the Victorian border to the south, and the area to the north of the Brogo River the boundary to the north. It includes Bega, Eden and Merimbula.

The county was named after George Eden, who was the First Earl of Auckland between (1784–1849). (Coincidentally, the county has the same latitude as the city of Auckland, New Zealand – which was also named for George Eden.) In 1852, the county had an area of 1,536,000 acres (6,220 km^{2}) and was described as being mountainous with fertile plains.

== Parishes within this county ==
A full list of parishes found within this county; their current LGA and mapping coordinates to the approximate centre of each location is as follows:

Parish	LGA	Coordinates
Bega	Bega Valley Shire	36°40′54″S 149°54′04″E
Bemboka	Bega Valley Shire	36°40′54″S 149°37′04″E
Bimmil	Bega Valley Shire	36°59′54″S 149°50′04″E
Bondi	Snowy Monaro Regional Council	37°06′54″S 149°15′04″E
Bournda	Bega Valley Shire	36°48′54″S 149°55′04″E
Boyd	Bega Valley Shire	37°00′54″S 149°43′04″E
Bredbendoura	Bega Valley Shire	36°45′54″S 149°30′04″E
Brogo	Bega Valley Shire	36°37′54″S 149°51′04″E
Bronte	Bega Valley Shire	36°34′54″S 149°45′04″E
Buckle	Bega Valley Shire	37°18′54″S 149°41′04″E
Burragate	Bega Valley Shire	36°58′54″S 149°38′04″E
Candelo	Bega Valley Shire	36°43′54″S 149°45′04″E
Cobra	Bega Valley Shire	36°53′54″S 149°47′04″E
Colombo	Bega Valley Shire	36°33′54″S 149°26′04″E
Coolangubra	Bega Valley Shire	36°59′54″S 149°30′04″E
Eden	Bega Valley Shire	37°03′54″S 149°51′04″E
Genoa	Snowy Monaro Regional Council	37°08′54″S 149°25′04″E
Gnupa	Bega Valley Shire	36°57′54″S 149°47′04″E
Gooyan	Bega Valley Shire	37°14′54″S 149°47′04″E
Howe	Bega Valley Shire	37°21′54″S 149°56′04″E
Imlay	Bega Valley Shire	37°04′54″S 149°44′04″E
Kameruka	Bega Valley Shire	36°44′54″S 149°50′04″E
Kanoonah	Bega Valley Shire	36°55′54″S 149°25′04″E
Kiah	Bega Valley Shire	37°07′54″S 149°56′04″E
Kokoboreeka	Bega Valley Shire	36°23′54″S 149°35′04″E
Mataganah	Bega Valley Shire	36°58′54″S 149°34′04″E
Meringo	Bega Valley Shire	36°41′54″S 149°46′04″E
Mogila	Bega Valley Shire	36°41′54″S 149°30′04″E
Mokoreeka	Bega Valley Shire	36°27′54″S 149°31′04″E
Mookerwah	Bega Valley Shire	36°24′54″S 149°43′04″E
Mumbulla	Bega Valley Shire	36°29′54″S 149°48′04″E
Nalbaugh	Bega Valley Shire	37°03′54″S 149°23′04″E
Narrabarba	Bega Valley Shire	37°15′54″S 149°53′04″E
Nullica	Bega Valley Shire	37°07′54″S 149°49′04″E
Numbugga	Bega Valley Shire	36°38′54″S 149°46′04″E
Nungatta	Bega Valley Shire	37°12′54″S 149°27′04″E
Ooranook	Bega Valley Shire	36°33′54″S 149°34′04″E
Pambula	Bega Valley Shire	36°52′54″S 149°54′04″E
Pericoe	Bega Valley Shire	37°05′54″S 149°33′04″E
Puen Buen	Bega Valley Shire	36°28′54″S 149°45′04″E
Sturt	Bega Valley Shire	37°11′54″S 149°42′04″E
Tantawangalo	Bega Valley Shire	36°45′54″S 149°34′04″E
Towamba	Bega Valley Shire	37°07′54″S 149°42′04″E
Victoria	Bega Valley Shire	37°20′54″S 149°52′04″E
Waalimma	Bega Valley Shire	37°16′54″S 149°32′04″E
Wallagaraugh	Bega Valley Shire	37°19′54″S 149°45′04″E
Wallagoot	Bega Valley Shire	36°43′54″S 149°56′04″E
Werri Berri	Bega Valley Shire	36°33′45″S 149°30′00″E
Wolumla	Bega Valley Shire	36°48′54″S 149°48′04″E
Wonboyn	Bega Valley Shire	37°12′54″S 149°56′04″E
Wyndham	Bega Valley Shire	36°54′49″S 149°39′43″E
Yambulla	Bega Valley Shire	37°11′54″S 149°34′04″E
Yowaka	Bega Valley Shire	36°57′54″S 149°50′34″E
Yuglamah	Bega Valley Shire	36°52′54″S 149°30′04″E
Yurammie	Bega Valley Shire	36°49′54″S 149°40′04″E
