= Land and Valuation Court of New South Wales =

The Land and Valuation Court of New South Wales was a court which had jurisdiction to deal with disputes concerning crown land in New South Wales. It replaced the Land Court of New South Wales on 10 December 1921 and itself replaced by the Land and Environment Court of New South Wales on 1 September 1980.

== Background to the establish of the court ==
The Crown Land Acts 1884 (NSW) created a new structure, introducing various new tenures of holding real property not previously in existence in Australia. These new tenures included grazing licences, homestead leases, conditional leases, and pastoral leases. There were also annual leases for pastoral purposes, and leases of scrub land. Lessees acquired the right to convert portions of land held under pastoral or homestead leases into scrub leases. There were leases for wharfs and jetties and leases for special purposes, such as dams, irrigation works, sawmills, and quarries and permits for wharfs and jetties.

To administer this new system, land in New South Wales was divided into three divisions, namely eastern, central and western divisions. Each division had a Local land board, which effectively decentralised the administration of Crown land in the State

Parties to any proceedings before a local land board were given a right to appeal from any adjudication or decision of the board to the Minister for Lands, who was directed to hear and determine the appeals as in open court.

The Crown Lands Act 1889 (NSW) introduced a Land Court of New South Wales which replaced the ministerial court. The new court comprised three members who were appointed by the Governor of New South Wales. The governor could appoint of the members as the President. The Land Court heard all appeals and all matters referred to it by the Minister or by a local land board, making orders or awards which were conclusive on the parties and had the force of a common law judgment of the Supreme Court of New South Wales.

Questions of law arising in cases in the Land Court could be referred to the Supreme Court in the form of a stated case, on the request of any party or of the Court’s own motion.

The Crown Lands Consolidation Act 1913 (NSW) abolished the Land Court and constituted a Land Appeal Court of New South Wales consisting of three members, one of whom was the President. The jurisdiction of the Land Appeal Court was similar to that of its predecessor, the Land Court, and again provision was made for the stating and submitting of a case for the decision of the Supreme Court on any question of law.

The Law Reform Commission of New South Wales states in its twenty third report that the death of the President and the advancing ages of the two members of the Land Appeal Court furnished a suitable opportunity in 1921 for the New South Wales Government to recast the constitution of that court. This was effected by the Land and Valuation Court Act 1921 (NSW). The Land Appeal Court was abolished and a new court was constituted as the Land and Valuation Court.

== Composition of the court ==
The court was constituted by a judge having the same rank, title, status, and precedence and the same salary and rights as the judges of the Supreme Court.

The first judge of the Court was the Honourable Mr Justice Pike, who held office from 21 December 1921 to 24 May 1937. The Honourable Mr Justice Else-Mitchell was a judge of the court who retired on 1 October 1974. Laurence Street, who subsequently became Chief Justice of New South Wales, was also appointed a judge of the Court on 28 October 1974.

== Jurisdiction of the court ==
Jurisdiction was conferred on the Court to hear and determine matters which had previously been heard in the former Land Appeal Court of New South Wales. Subsequently, the Court was given jurisdiction to hear objections to and appeals against valuations of land, the levying of rates or charges and the assessment of rateable property under various Acts, and claims made for compensation by reason of the acquisition of land under the Public Works Act 1912 (NSW) where such claim exceeded £100. The right of appeal by way of case stated for the decision of the Supreme Court was retained.

From 1927, the court could hear appeals in relation to the value of land resumed under the Closer Settlement Acts.

From 1945, the court heard appeals from local councils decisions concerning applications to erect buildings, to open new public roads and to subdivide land, instead of the District Court of New South Wales. They could also hear claims for compensation exceeding £100 made in respect prescribed planning schemes

From 1958, Boards of Appeal were established to hear appeals from councils on building and subdivision applications. Parties then had a right of appeal in certain circumstances to the Court by special case on a question of law.

In 1962, valuation boards of review were constituted to hear objections against valuations of land made under the Valuation of Land Act, 1916 instead of the court. However, there still remained a right of appeal to the court and a board could refer a question to the court for determination.

In 1972, the Local Government Appeals Tribunal of New South Wales was established to hear planning and development appeals instead of the Court.

== Business of the court ==
The first proceedings of the Court were held on 14 February 1922.

According to the New South Wales Law Commission, in 1975 there were approximately 181 appeals lodged under the Local Government Act 1919 (NSW), seven claims for compensation for compulsory resumption of land, eight appeals lodged pursuant to section 38 of the Valuation of Land Act 1916 (NSW) from valuation boards of review, two claims for compensation lodged pursuant to section 342AC (1) of the Local Government Act 1919 (NSW), and ten references under the Crown Lands Consolidation Act 1913 (NSW), by the Minister from local land boards.
