= Walgett railway line =

Railway line in New South Wales, Australia

Technical
- Track gauge: 1,435 mm (4 ft 8 1/2 in)
- Signalling: Train Order Working
- Train protection system: TMACS

The Walgett railway line is a railway line in north-western New South Wales, Australia. Opening in 1908, it branches from the North-West Line at Narrabri and passes through the towns of Wee Waa and Burren before ending in the town of Walgett. The line is used for wheat haulage, and the section between the Walgett wheat terminal and Walgett station is closed. There was a proposal to connect the Gwabegar line to the Walgett line at Burren Junction in 1913, and although approved, this connection was never constructed.

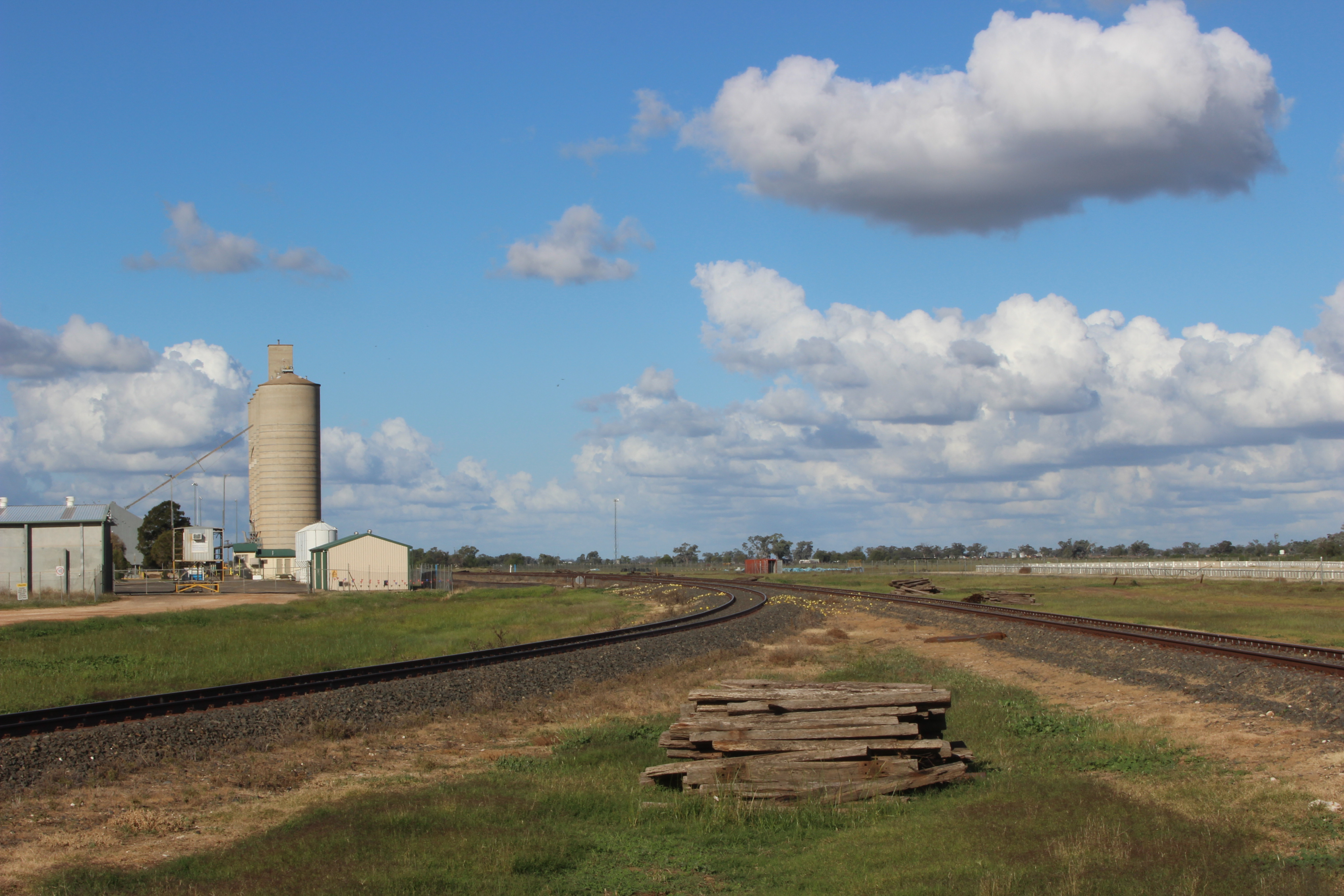
Burren Junction

== See also ==
- Rail transport in New South Wales
- Rail rollingstock in New South Wales
