= Pokataroo =

Pokataroo New South Wales
- Coordinates: 29°35′30″S 148°42′00″E
- LGA(s): Walgett Shire
- State electorate(s): Barwon

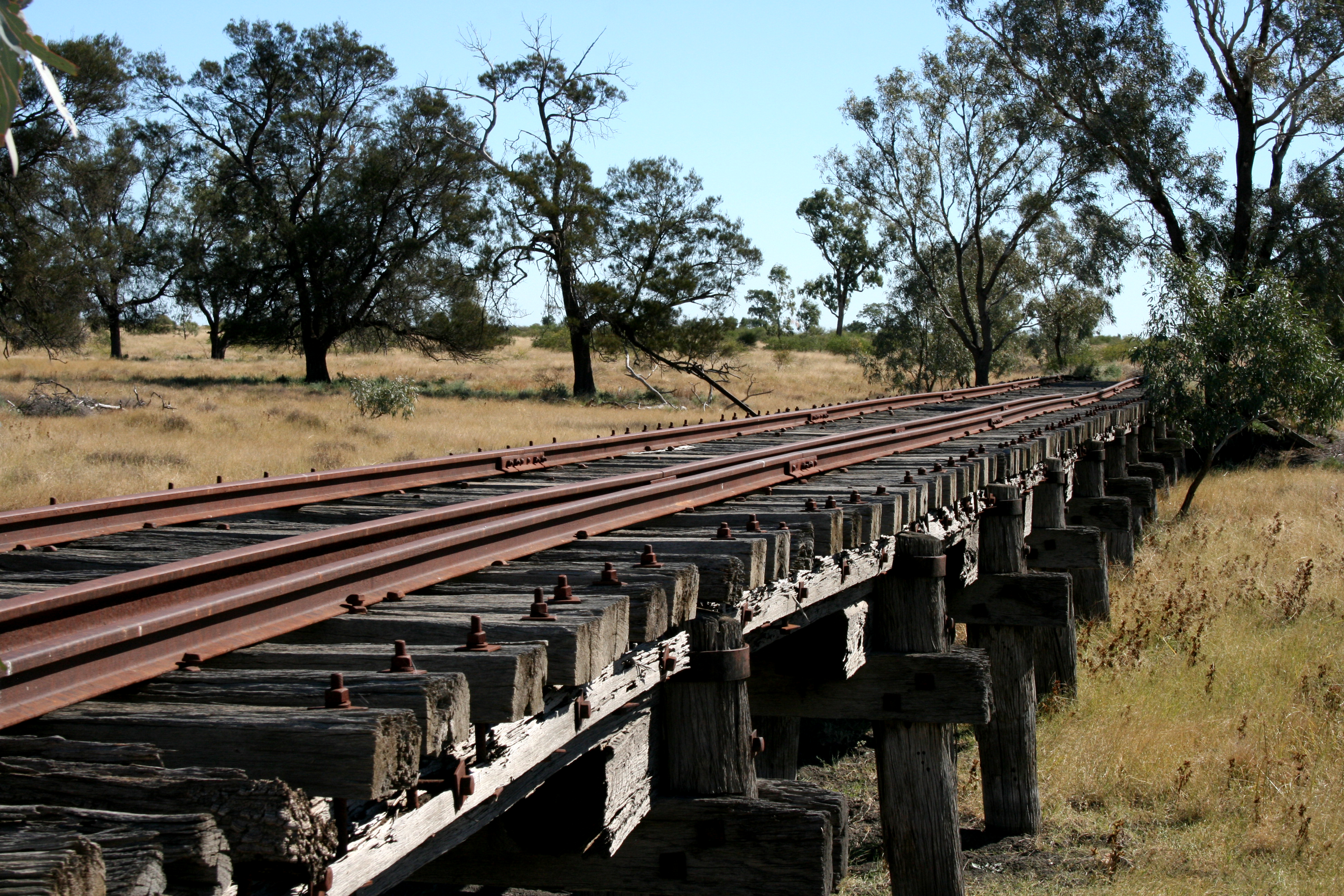
Pokartoo Rail Bridge

Pokataroo is a small settlement in the far north-west of New South Wales, Australia, that lies in the Walgett Shire. It is made up of approximately 20 people, with only 10 buildings not including the large family farm of Taroo that takes up a large part of the eastern side of the road.

It used to have a railway station.
