= Eastern Division (New South Wales) =

Division of New South Wales, Australia

The Eastern Division of New South Wales can refer to either one of two school divisions in the NSW education system or one of three cadastral divisions of New South Wales for land management purposes.

== NSW school divisions ==
The Eastern division of New South Wales is one of the two school divisions of New South Wales.

The Eastern Division schools generally return to school one week earlier than their Western Division counterparts. This is historical and could have been due to higher temperatures in the Western Suburbs during that time of year. In addition, there is reference to the division of NSW in the Teachers Salaries and Conditions Award with respect to Climatic Disability.

There is no known map or explicit demarcation of its boundary. A source describes the line of division:

...upon or to the west of a line starting from a point on the right bank of the Murray River opposite Swan Hill (Victoria), and thence by straight lines passing through the following towns or localities in the order stated, viz., Conargo, Coleambally, Hay, Rankins Springs, Marsden, Condobolin, Peak Hill, Nevertire, Gulargambone, Coonabarabran, Wee Waa, Moree, Warialda, Ashford and Bonshaw

== Crown Lands Act of 1869 ==
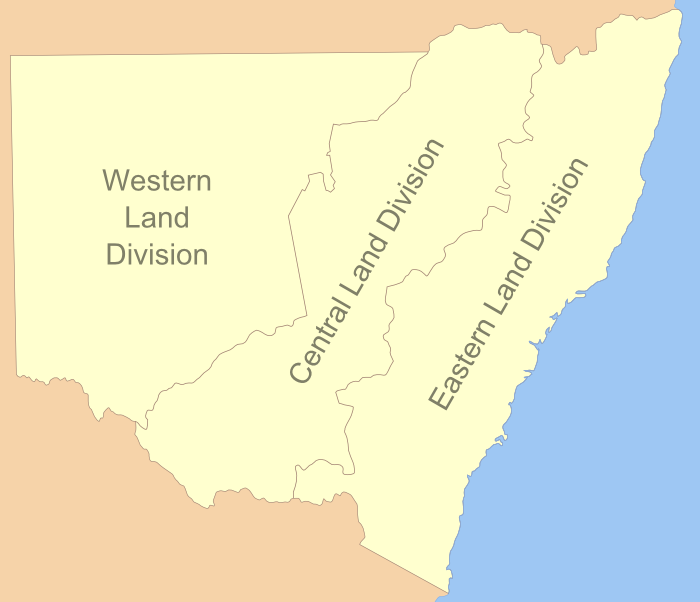
The three land divisions

The Eastern Division of New South Wales is one of the three cadastral divisions of New South Wales along with the Central and Western divisions, established under the Crown Lands Act of 1869 for the purposes of land management and the separation of metropolitan and rural/regional areas. It is the most populated of the divisions, including Sydney and large coastal cities such as Newcastle and Wollongong. In 1907 it included the Armidale, Port Macquarie, Grafton, Maitland, Dungog, Scone, the Blue mountains, Sydney, Goulburn, Lismore, Coffs Harbour and Orange land boards, as well as the eastern part of the Wagga Wagga, Dubbo and Tamworth land boards.

== See also ==
- Western Division (New South Wales)
