= Merrywinebone, New South Wales =

Merrywinebone
- Coordinates: 29°41′15″S 148°48′51″E
- Country: Australia
- State: New South Wales
- LGA: Walgett Shire

Merrywinebone is a locality in far north-western New South Wales, Australia. It is the current terminus of the Pokataroo railway line, and features a large grain loading facility. It is located in the Walgett Shire.
