= Burren Junction =

- Town
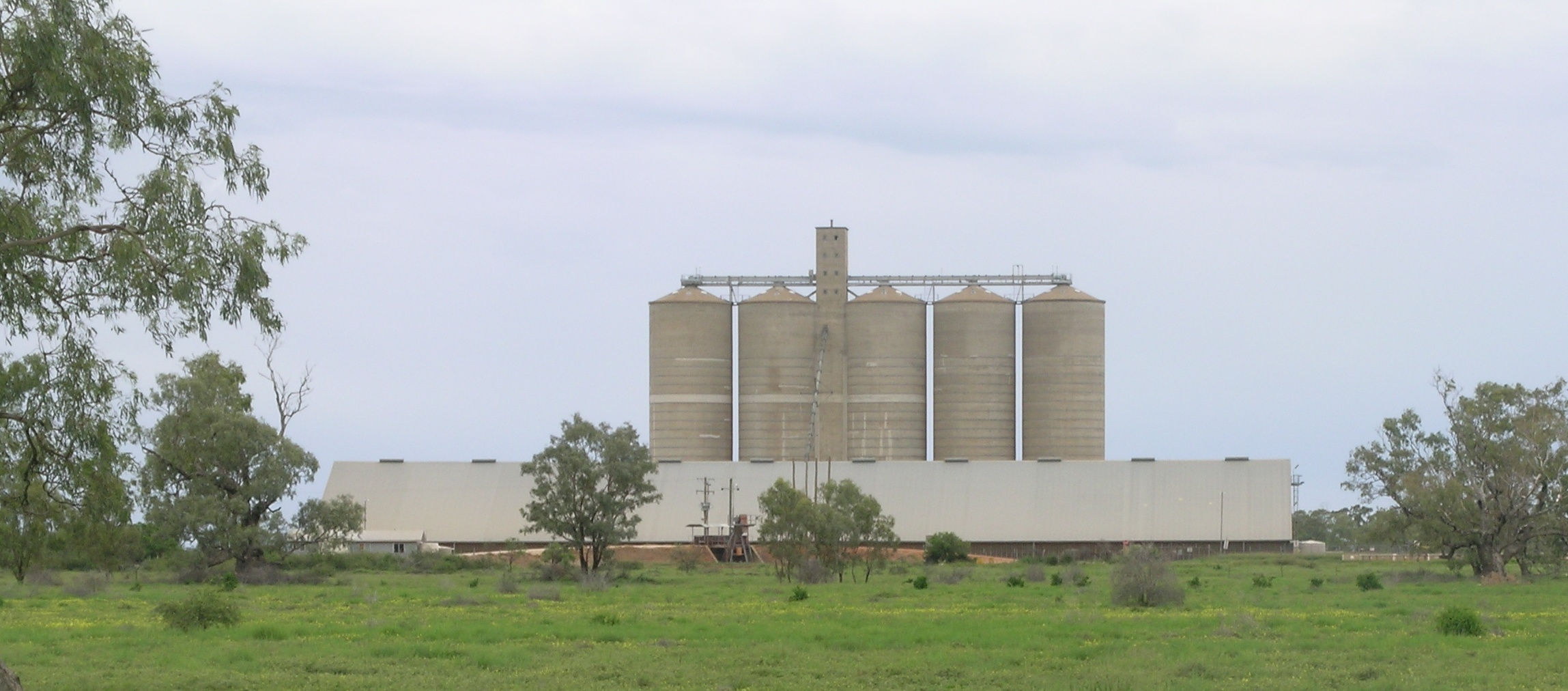
- Burren Junction wheat silo

- Coordinates: 30°07′S 148°58′E
- Country: Australia
- State: New South Wales
- LGAs: Walgett Shire; Narrabri Shire
- Location: 51 km (32 mi) W of Wee Waa; 92 km (57 mi) E of Walgett; 609 km (378 mi) NNW of Sydney; 638 km (396 mi) SW of Brisbane

Government
  - State electorate: Barwon
  - Federal division: Parkes
- Elevation: 163 m (535 ft)

Population
  - Total: 276 (2016 census)
- Postcode: 2386

Burren Junction is a New South Wales village 51 km west of Wee Waa, on the Kamilaroi Highway to Walgett. The name is from the local Aboriginal word for boomerang or 'big creek'. Burren Junction grew from a railway encampment which came from the extension of the north-western rail line in 1902. Burren Junction Post Office opened on 16 May 1904.

Burren Junction is in the Walgett Shire local government area and Jamison County. The village sits at an elevation of 163 metres and recorded a population of 276 at the 2016 census. Wheat and cotton growing are the main agricultural industries along with some sheep and beef cattle breeding.

The town has two churches, RSL and Sporting Club (now closed), a cafe, a primary school, a sports ground, plus a hotel. The Burren Junction Bore is a hot mineral water pool complex that is floodlit to provide day and night bathing. It is popular with tourists and locals as it has recently (2024) been upgraded and is clean, and well kept by a caretaker, it is cared for by The Walgett Shire Council.

There is also a pool, park and tennis court used for recreation. The tennis court is in poor condition, with only one of the three in passable condition. There used to be an annual tennis tournament in Burren Junction, however, this stopped in the 1980s. One method used to get the long weekend tennis tournament finished after rain was to fly a helicopter above the courts to dry the surface.

A Bachelor and Spinster Ball was held each year in Burren Junction, with people travelling from all over Australia to enjoy a night of fun and entertainment but had to be cancelled due to excessive insurance costs.

In 2006 the first Australian record of a grey-headed lapwing was made at Burren Junction, this migratory bird native to Eurasia was observed by passing birdwatchers in a field near the silos. The sighting attracted large numbers of birdwatching visitors from all over Australia for the duration of the bird's presence.

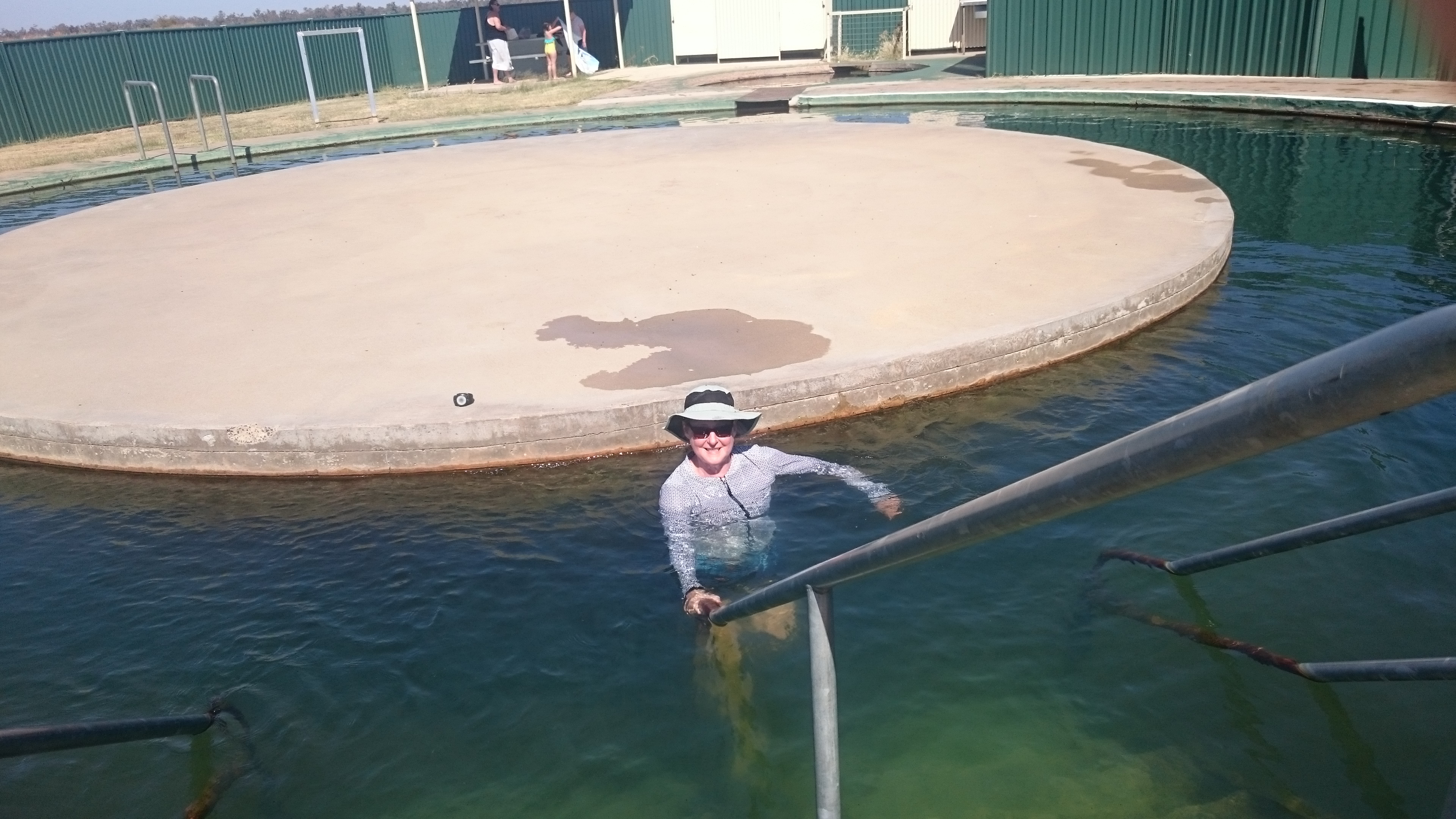
Burren Junction Bore Bath 2018

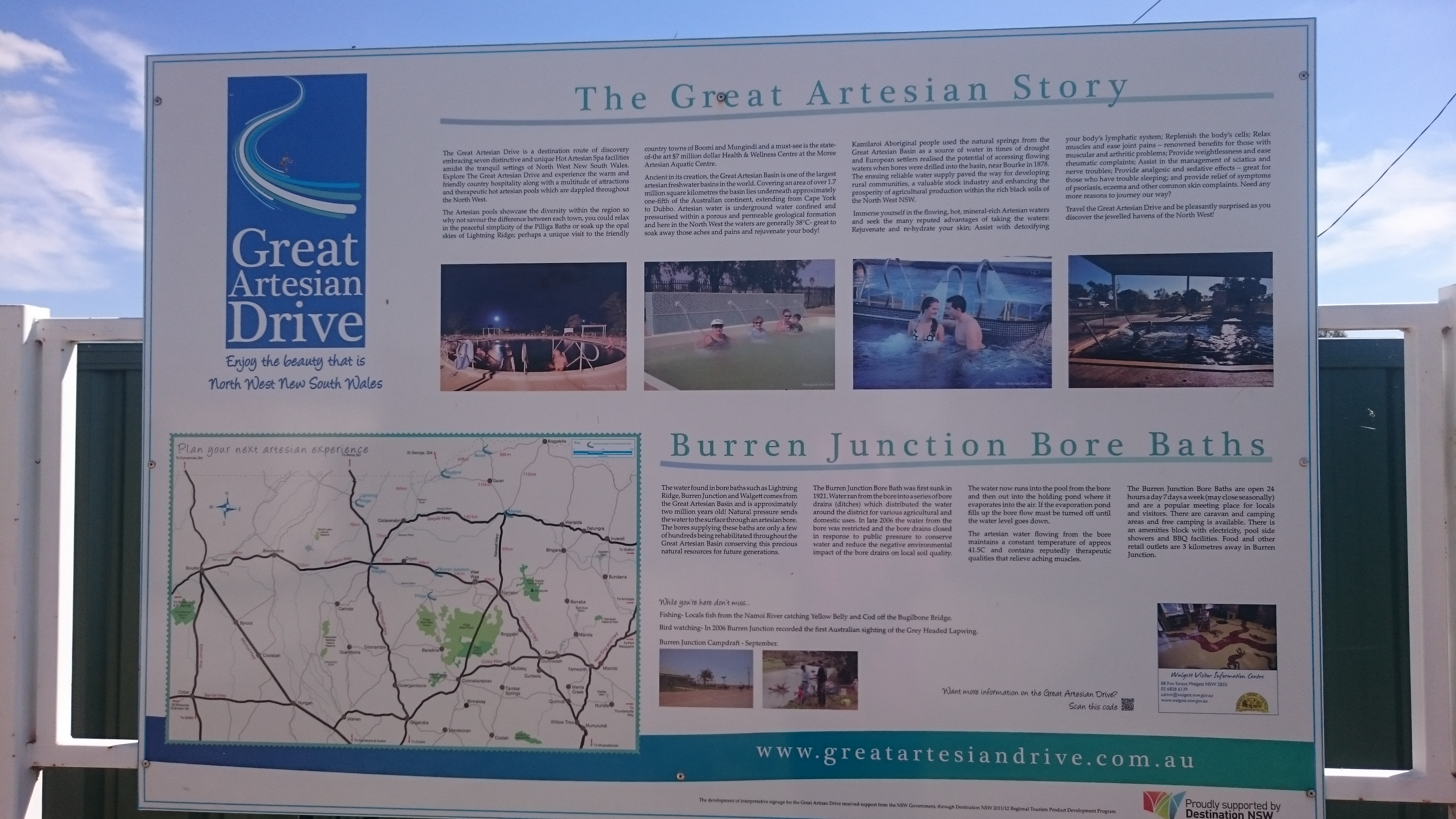
Burren Junction Bore Baths information sign 2018
