= County of Tambo, Victoria =

Coordinates: 37°30′S 148°05′E

Tambo Victoria
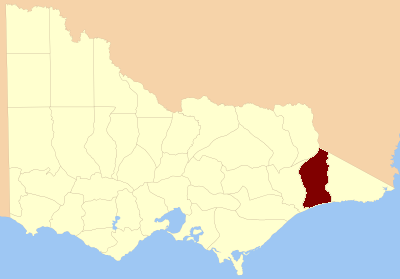
- Location in Victoria
- Established: 24 February 1871
- Area: 5,091 km^{2} (1,965.6 sq mi)
Lands administrative divisions around Tambo:
Benambra	Benambra	Wallace (NSW)
Dargo	Tambo	Croajingolong
Bass Strait	Bass Strait	Bass Strait

The County of Tambo is one of the 37 counties of Victoria which are part of the cadastral divisions of Australia, used for land titles. It is located in eastern Gippsland, between the Tambo River in the west, and the Snowy River in the east. It includes Lakes Entrance. Some time earlier maps showed proposed counties of Abinger and Combermere occupying the area.

== Parishes ==
Parishes include:

- Berrmarr, Victoria
- Bete Bolong North, Victoria
- Bete Bolong South, Victoria
- Bindi, Victoria
- Buchan, Victoria
- Chilpin, Victoria
- Colquhoun, Victoria
- Colquhoun East, Victoria
- Colquhoun North, Victoria
- Detarka, Victoria
- Ensay, Victoria
- Eucambene, Victoria
- Eumana, Victoria
- Forest Hill, Victoria
- Gelantipy East, Victoria
- Gelantipy West, Victoria
- Gillingal, Victoria
- Glenmore, Victoria
- Ingeegoobee, Victoria
- Kaerwut, Victoria
- Karawah, Victoria
- Maneroo, Victoria
- Marroo, Victoria
- Mellick-Munjie, Victoria
- Menaak, Victoria
- Murrindal East, Victoria
- Murrindal West, Victoria
- Nappa, Victoria
- Newmerella, Victoria
- Ninnie, Victoria
- Nowa Nowa, Victoria
- Nowa Nowa South, Victoria
- Noyong, Victoria
- Numbie-Munjie, Victoria
- Tildesley East, Victoria
- Tildesley West, Victoria
- Timbarra, Victoria
- Tongio-Munjie East, Victoria
- Toonginbooka, Victoria
- Waygara, Victoria
- Windarra, Victoria
- Woongulmerang East, Victoria
- Woongulmerang West, Victoria
