= Wooleybah Sawmill and Settlement =

- Location within New South Wales Location within Australia
- 30°45′57″S 148°48′58″E
- Location: Old Wooleybah Road, Kenebri, Warrumbungle Shire, New South Wales, Australia

History
- Built: 1935–

Site notes
- Owner: Forestry Commission of NSW (formerly State Forests of NSW)

New South Wales Heritage Register
- Official name: Wooleybah Sawmill and Settlement; Wooleybah; Dead Man's Waterhole
- Type: State heritage (complex / group)
- Designated: 17 December 2010
- Reference no.: 1846
- Type: Mill settlement
- Category: Aboriginal
- Builders: Underwood family

The Wooleybah Sawmill and Settlement is a heritage-listed former small settlement and sawmill at Old Wooleybah Road, Kenebri, Warrumbungle Shire, New South Wales, Australia. It was built from 1935 by the Underwood family. It is also known as Wooleybah Dead Man's Waterhole. The property is owned by Forestry Commission of NSW (formerly State Forests of NSW), an agency of the Government of New South Wales. It was added to the New South Wales State Heritage Register on 17 December 2010.

== History ==
=== Pre-European contact ===
Before Europeans arrived the Pilliga forest was predominately "open forest", comprising five or six large trees for each hectare of grassland. Traditional Aboriginal "fire-stick farming" practices over thousands of years maintained most of the Pilliga region as grassland and modified the natural composition and form of the forest. The understorey was managed by this process and as a result would have appeared different to the scrub it is now. The region which includes present-day Gwabegar, large areas of the Pilliga and bounded by the junction of the Namoi and Barwon Rivers in the west, south-west near Coonabarabran and east to Tamworth and Inverell is the land of the Gamilaroi people. After the arrival of Europeans Aboriginal people continued to live and work in the Pilliga and to maintain a traditional relationship with the land despite being actively discouraged from doing so by the new settlers. This relationship continues today.

=== Nineteenth-century settlement and early grazing ===
Following John Oxley's exploratory expedition to the north-western plains in 1818, the first non-Aboriginal settlers began to arrive in the 1830s. A Scotsman called Andrew Brown established an outstation on the banks of the Baradine Creek in the late 1830s, and in the 1860s the town of Baradine was established. Settlers introduced European grazing stock which eventually displaced much of the native fauna and led to the cessation of the Aboriginal fire practices.

=== Regeneration of the pine forest ===
The new settlers found the conditions inhospitable and unsuitable for intensive grazing. The decline in traditional Aboriginal fire controls after the 1830s, a severe drought in the 1870s which forced many settlers off their land, followed by heavy rain in early 1880s and the arrival of rabbits to the region in the late 1880s were all factors that disturbed the pre-contact composition of the Pilliga forests and led to the creation of the forests as we now know them: primarily regenerated ironbark and white cypress pine forests. By the 1880s the Pilliga Forest had been transformed into dense scrub made up of thousands of young trees in areas which had, as little as ten years earlier, been open enough to run sheep.

=== Management of the Pilliga as a timber resource ===
Following the failure of early non-Aboriginal grazing attempts the area was deemed more suitable for timber production than for settlement. The timber potential of the Pilliga forests was recognised when the first Forest Reserve was declared in 1876, and by the end of the 1870s a timber industry had developed. Further reserves were dedicated in 1877 and 1878. The railway line to Narrabri was constructed in 1882 and the Pilliga was initially logged for its ironbark needed for railway sleepers. Logs were taken by bullock wagon to the rail head at Narrabri. In the late 1890s deliberate "thinning" or harvesting of the cypress pine forests began. The thinning opened up the area around the larger trees which would then take on a new growth spurt, even after laying dormant for years. Following the 1908 Royal Commission of Enquiry into Forests, the NSW Forestry Commission was created by the 1909 Forestry Act. This began the deliberate government management for timber production of what was recognised as a young forest, compared to the older, heavily depleted coastal forests. Despite the introduction of the 1909 Forestry Act there was a conflict between the Lands Department that wanted to clear land and the Forestry Commission who wanted land reserved for State forest. In 1916 the Forestry Act was changed to allow dedication of State forests and on 2 March 1917 the area known as the Pilliga West State Forest No 267 was dedicated.

=== Aboriginal people and the Pilliga Forest ===
Oral history projects undertaken with Aboriginal people in recent years show that the Pilliga forests are the location of social, economic and spiritual activities in the traditional, historic and current periods. Forests are particularly valued as locations in which skills, knowledge and traditions can be handed down. The decline of forested areas has increased the cultural value placed on those that remain. Aboriginal people played a significant role in the forestry industry in NSW particularly in the Pilliga. Aboriginal communities have been a constant source of labour and knowledge in the economic life of the region and have had a central, though largely unacknowledged, role in its economic development. Working in the forestry industry not only provided employment but was a means for Aboriginal people to maintain contact with the land they valued. From the contact period up until the 1950s, Aboriginal people continued to camp, travel, and live in the forest when timber cutting. This allowed traditional practices, knowledge and activities to be continued. The forest had a diversity of plant and animal life that provided a source of food and medicine and supplemented rations. Hunting and gathering was an enjoyable activity which kept stories and knowledge alive. The forest was also a place of refuge where families could live without fear of surveillance and in some instances provided escape from the authorities who sought to remove Aboriginal children from their families. Aboriginal people moved through the Pilliga according to complex patterns of movement centred around kinship ties and frequently facilitated through work patterns. These patterns of movement are understood to be the continuation of traditional patterns into the historical period and through to the current day.

=== Establishment of the sawmill at Wooleybah ===
Controlled thinning of the Pilliga forest continued through the Great Depression and the late 1930s using unemployed relief work. Such labour also contributed to the forest infrastructure, providing fences, water bores, roads, fire look-out towers and a telephone line. On 29 September 1937 17 forests comprising a total of 253,169 hectares (625,593 acres) in the Pilliga were consolidated to create the Pilliga National Forest No 7. Following the First World War an attempt was made to settle farmers in the Pilliga. The Commonwealth Government required the opening of all available Crown lands within a distance of 24 kilometres (15 mi) from the railway route in the interests of returned soldiers. A railway line had been proposed between Coonabarabran and Burren Junction in 1913 which passed through the Pilliga. The railway reached Coonabarabran in 1917 and in anticipation of its extension to Gwabegar, 72 homestead farms near present-day Gwabegar and Kenebri were created in December 1919. The settlement failed and most returned soldiers walked off their land. The railway line didn't reach Gwabegar until September 1923. While the attempted settlement of returned soldiers failed, the opening of the railway line to Gwabegar boosted the accessibility of the area for timber cutting, and a number of small, independent milling operations were set up in the forest.

In January 1935 the NSW Forestry Commission issued a 5-hectare (12-acre) Occupation Permit to the Underwood family at Wooleybah. The Underwood family had already operated two sawmills in the Euligal State Forest, near Narrabri (including one at Rocky Creek) in the 1920s, and in the early 1930s moved their milling operation to Wooleybah. They brought with them milling equipment, including an English steam engine to power the mill which had previously been used in tin mines at Inverell. A small forest sawmilling community developed around the mill. At this time small sawmills were located in the bush so that timber could be milled near where it was logged because it was easier to transport milled timber than large logs. During the Second World War there were 14 cypress pine sawmills in the Pilliga, many of which operated as "portable" sawmills, opening and closing according to the location of the timber and relocating machinery as needed. For the life of the mill the work force was composed of 50% Aboriginal workers and 50% non-Aboriginal workers. The majority of workers and their families lived at the mill in small timber houses on the fringes of the clearing. The time spent at Wooleybah is remembered with fondness by those surviving today who have an association with the place. Robyn Rutley remembers going to Wooleybah when she was a child in the 1950s. "It was like a village. The Underwoods treated their workers like a family. They took them under their wing." "It was a comforting place." Patricia Madden (née Kinchela) remembers Wooleybah from when she lived there as a young woman in the 1960s. She describes it as a "good place to work, there were never any fights, everyone wanted to be there." Mervin Donald (Don) Sutherland visited his uncles at Wooleybah when he was a child. His uncles' families lived in houses at Wooleybah. Don, Pat and Robyn all remember playing in the forest as children. They describe the freedom they felt and the games building "bush humpies" and collecting bush tucker such as geebungs, five corners and quandongs. They also describe the difficulties faced by their parents and themselves in the community outside the Wooleybah and forest community. These difficulties centred around discriminatory practices such as segregation, difficulties in finding work and feeding their families and discrimination at school. These social problems were not experienced at Wooleybah where everyone was treated equally and there was a friendly happy atmosphere. The work force was united by a benevolent management and the need for team work in what was a dangerous and highly skilled industry. Since the 1920s cypress pine has been a major forest product in NSW and used in the construction of timber-frame housing. The white cypress pine logged and milled at Wooleybah has been used primarily for domestic timber flooring.

The Underwoods continue to live at Wooleybah occupying one house whilst a retired mill worker lies in what is known as the Forester's house. One of the residences was at one time the schoolteacher's residence, and prior to that the Forestry foreman's residence where, Walter Cornwell, the first forest foreman resided. According to Curby and Humphreys, this is not the standard Forestry Commission foreman's house. This suggests that it may have already been on the site before the Forestry Commission was established in 1909. Before her marriage, Tom Underwood's mother Mary and her mother used to travel through Wooleybah on their way to Coonamble, and she recalled a house there in the early years of the twentieth century. The water tank next to the house continues to be the property of the Forestry Commission.

=== Wooleybah School ===
The original school building was "across the road", and provided tuition for about 9-12 children. In 1937 when the numbers of children of mill workers and surrounding families reached 20, an application for a provisional school was made. The NSW Department of Education approved the application at the end of 1937 and in September 1941 an Education Dept school building no longer needed at Talama was moved to Wooleybah.

=== Further forest regeneration (1950s) ===
Following improvements in transport in the post-war years, sawmills moved into the towns to be closer to the railway line and most of the small forest sawmilling communities were abandoned. Sites of other nearby sawmills include Ceelnoy and Wombo in Pilliga West State Forest, and Rocky Creek in the central Pilliga. Wooleybah sawmill and settlement survives as the last intact bush sawmill in the Pilliga State Forests.

In the 1950s, the Pilliga forests underwent a second major period of accelerated growth, similar to their expansion in the 1880s. Heavy rain in 1949 and the introduction of myxomatosis in the early 1950s to control rabbits permitted large numbers of tree seedlings to survive. By 1982 thinning of the nineteenth-century growth was completed, and harvesting of the 1950s growth began.

The 1960s to the present, according to Tom Underwood, the original steam engine was replaced with a new Robey steam engine in 1953–1954.

The mill at Wooleybah burnt down twice, in 1960 and 1962, and has been rebuilt. After the 1960 fire, steam power was replaced with a small diesel plant. After the 1962 fire, electricity was installed and connected in 1963. Nothing from the 1930s mill structure remains, although the two old steam engines remain on site. The residences, accommodation huts and the school buildings survive from the 1930s and 1940s.

In 1965 the Underwood family bought a sawmill at Gwabegar and in 1968 another at Kenebri. The mill at Wooleybah was managed by Tom Underwood's uncle, Dan Casey while Underwood managed the mill at Gwabegar. The mill at Wooleybah was closed when Casey retired in c. 1988. It was later leased to Colin Head in c. 1993 before finally closing in the late 1990s.

The Wooleybah sawmill has been a major local employer within the local Aboriginal community, with many families living on site. According to Tom Underwood and his uncle, Dan Casey, the Wooleybah mill, from the 1930s to the 1990s, employed a large number of Aboriginal workers who lived on site with their families. Tom Underwood estimated that, on average at any time, half the employees were Aboriginal and, together with their families, largely comprised the live-in population. Generally, staff consisted of approximately 12 workers and their families: about nine lived at Wooleybah settlement and three lived in the bush camps, cutting timber. Relations were consistently harmonious and Tom Underwood believes that the Wooleybah mill and settlement was the first time Aboriginals and white people worked together, making the mill historically and socially important to the local Pilliga, Gwabegar and Barradine communities.

The Wooleybah School continued to operate until 1967. In the 1950s and 1960s Tom Underwood estimates that the school catered for up to 50 children. Numbers declined and by the time of its closure, it had only 12-20 children.

Tom Underwood recalls that both Aboriginal and white children from the mill and surrounding rural properties attended the Wooleybah school.

== Description ==
Wooleybah Sawmill and Settlement is located in a clearing in the Pilliga West State Forest. The clearing consists of an occupancy permit that is approximately 11 hectares (27 acres) in area. There are ten small houses arranged around the north and north eastern periphery of the clearing at roughly similar spacing apart. These were family houses of the workers. Two other worker's houses were removed recently to house Vietnamese migrants at a different location. None of the small houses on site are occupied and have varying degree of integrity. They are all intact although they are in poor condition and are not inhabited. The majority of these houses were built to a traditional workers cottage design with a transverse gable roof, a skillion veranda and a skillion lean to at the rear. There are a couple of houses which are more recent and are identified by their roofs which are simple skillions over the main rooms together with a smaller skillion over the front veranda.

There is a larger house on site which predates the Wooleybah settlement and is now known as the Forester's house. It is currently occupied by a former worker. Next to it is the Wooleybah bore. The Forestry foreman's residence was probably the Baccon family home who were living at Dead Man's Waterhole (the name of the site before it was called Wooleybah) in 1914.

There are two houses that have been continuously occupied and expanded over time to suit the needs of their occupants the Underwood's who are the mill owners and holders of the occupancy permit.

Near the main road within the clearing is the former Wooleybah Public School which consists of two buildings. Between the school and the Forester's house is the site of an original school. There is no visible evidence on the ground of the original school however there may be archaeological evidence on closer inspection.

The saw mill itself is located close to the Underwood's houses and roughly in the centre of the clearing. The original mill machinery is house under a corrugated steel shed open on the sides. There is a conveyor belt from the mill to a large dam known as the "bull ring". One of the original steam driven engines is still on site along with various other obsolete pieces of machinery.

On the western side of the clearing outside the tree line near the creek and the road crossing is a grave. The grave predates the saw mill settlement and its location was previously referred to as "Dead Man's Waterhole". There is a contemporary granite headstone with three plaques which mark the burial of Margaret Baccon (née McCubin), provides the history of the burial and contains a poem. The headstone is surrounded by a contemporary steel picket fence.

As at 5 February 2003, most of the buildings were reported to survive in their original state (1930s-1940s) but many were severely dilapidated. The mill building was constructed in 1963. It is possible that it was rebuilt using re-used and salvaged timber, but further research is needed to confirm this. The original steam engines remain on site, but have not been in working order since the 1960 fire. Other milling machinery has been retained on site since the closure of the mill under the original roof. The integrity of the equipment and its retention in its original layout provides an understanding of the workings of the original mill when it was operational.

Due to the European disturbance of the site, it is unlikely that the site contains archaeological potential relating to pre-contact Aboriginal occupation. It is possible the site may contain archaeological potential relating to European occupation such as grazing and early attempts at settlement.

The surviving structures at Wooleybah are highly intact, dating from various construction phases in the 1930s, 1940s and 1960s, and possibly earlier. Some are in a severely dilapidated state and require conservation work.

== Heritage listing ==
The Wooleybah Sawmill and Settlement is of State heritage significance as a rare surviving and intact example of a bush sawmill and settlement dating from the 1930s in the Pilliga scrub, the largest Cypress Pine forest in NSW. The Wooleybah Sawmill and Settlement is highly significant as having been a major source of employment for the local Aboriginal community from the 1930s until the closure of the mill in the late 1990s. The place demonstrates a social environment in which there was a harmonious relationship between Aboriginal and non-Aboriginal families who lived and worked together during times where such relationships were severely strained elsewhere by such activities as removal of children and segregation.

The Wooleybah Sawmill and Settlement contains physical evidence of all aspects of life at the mill including residential accommodation, a school, office, bore, road and the saw mill and associated mill structures as well as their relationships to each other. Wooleybah has the ability to demonstrate the technological practices associated with saw milling from the 1930s until the 1990s and the social organisation of small forest milling communities.

Wooleybah provides evidence of the deliberate management of the Pilliga forests as a regenerated timber resource and the early relocatable timber-industry practice of moving milling operations close to the source of timber. In particular Wooleybah is an example of the historical development of the forestry industry in Pilliga West State Forest.

Aboriginal people played a considerable role in the forestry industry and in particular in the Pilliga. Wooleybah is one site that survives which documents this role. The Pilliga Forest is culturally highly significant for Aboriginal people, who used the forest both as a means to maintain cultural connections to the land and to make a living or survive through bush skills. Timber cutting was an important strategy for keeping in contact with the land they valued in a time when Aboriginal people were discouraged from speaking their language and traditional cultural practices. Wooleybah settlement was one of very few places where Aboriginal people could live and work alongside non-Aboriginal people and still maintain their connection with the land. Forests appear in the oral histories as the location of social, economic and spiritual activities in the traditional, historic and current periods. Forests are particularly valued as locations in which skills, knowledge and traditions can be handed down.

The Wooleybah school operated from the 1930s until 1967 and has significance as a local primary school which served the sawmilling settlement and surrounding rural families and has added significance as a place of Aboriginal education.

Wooleybah Sawmill and Settlement was listed on the New South Wales State Heritage Register on 17 December 2010 having satisfied the following criteria.

The place is important in demonstrating the course, or pattern, of cultural or natural history in New South Wales.

The Wooleybah Sawmill and Settlement is of State significance in demonstrating the history of forestry operations in the Pilliga forests. The mill was established in 1935 by Crown lease to harvest Cypress Pine and demonstrates the deliberate management of NSW forests as a timber resource following the gazetting of the Pilliga National Forest in 1937. The Wooleybah sawmill and settlement has wider significance in demonstrating the history of the timber industry in western New South Wales and the deliberate management of the Pilliga forests as a regenerated timber resource. The Wooleybah Sawmill and Settlement is historically significant as a place of employment for the local Aboriginal community from the 1930s until the closure of the mill in the late 1990s. The place demonstrates a social environment in which there was a harmonious relationship between Aboriginal and white families who lived and worked together during times where such relationships were severely strained elsewhere by such activities as removal of children and segregation. The Wooleybah Sawmill and Settlement demonstrates the early practice of locating and moving milling operations close to the source of timber for easier transport of the milled timber to the railway.

The place has a strong or special association with a person, or group of persons, of importance of cultural or natural history of New South Wales's history.

The Wooleybah sawmill and settlement have no known associations with any person of note at the state level.

The place is important in demonstrating aesthetic characteristics and/or a high degree of creative or technical achievement in New South Wales.

The Wooleybah sawmill and settlement have some aesthetic significance at the local level as a collection of unsophisticated, vernacular rural buildings. They vary in age, and together demonstrate the development of the Wooleybah settlement and the make-do traditions of the Australian bush.

The place has strong or special association with a particular community or cultural group in New South Wales for social, cultural or spiritual reasons.

Throughout the 20th century the Pilliga Forest has continued to be culturally highly significant for Aboriginal people, who used the forest both as a means to maintain cultural connections to the land and to make a living or survive through bush skills. Timber cutting was an important strategy for keeping in contact with the land they valued in a time when Aboriginal people were discouraged from speaking their language and traditional cultural practices. Wooleybah settlement was one of very few places where Aboriginal people could live and work alongside non-Aboriginal people and still maintain their connection with the land. The esteem with which the local community hold the place and the Underwood's is still evident.

The Wooleybah school is of significance for the local Gwabegar, Pilliga and Baradine communities. It is the site of an early primary school which served the timber milling community and surrounding rural families between the 1930s and 1967. In view of the history of Aboriginal families living and working at Wooleybah and their children attending the school, the school buildings have added significance as a place of Aboriginal education from the 1930s at a time when Aboriginal attendance at school was historically low.

The place has potential to yield information that will contribute to an understanding of the cultural or natural history of New South Wales.

The Wooleybah sawmill and settlement is of State significance for its ability to demonstrate early timber milling practices, processes and technology. The site includes early machinery and examples of various power sources (steam engines, diesel and electricity) and displays research potential in relation to timber milling technology and practices from the 1930s onwards. The Wooleybah sawmill and settlement is one of very few surviving intact sawmilling sites in New South Wales. The site includes managers residence, school buildings and accommodation huts and is able to demonstrate the social organisation of small forest milling communities. It also displays research potential in relation to the vernacular construction of the buildings and make-do traditions of the Australian bush. Wooleybah has research potential for its ability to demonstrate a place of employment in the Pilliga for Aboriginal people in the period from 1930's to 1990's in a settlement rather than as itinerant timber and sleeper cutters. The Wooleybah sawmill and settlement may display some archaeological potential relating to previous European occupation of the site, such as the site of the first school. This is of low research value however as sources for information exist elsewhere.

The place possesses uncommon, rare or endangered aspects of the cultural or natural history of New South Wales.

The Pilliga forests are possibly the largest regenerated cypress pine forests in Australia and the Wooleybah settlement is the only surviving intact example of the small rural communities established within the Pilliga forests in the 1920s and 1930s when cypress pine began to be harvested for use in the housing industry. With improved transport after the Second World War, whole logs were able to be transported and small forest sawmilling communities such as Wooleybah were dismantled or abandoned. The settlement survives as a rare, intact example of an early forest sawmilling community.

The place is important in demonstrating the principal characteristics of a class of cultural or natural places/environments in New South Wales.

The Wooleybah Sawmill and Settlement is a representative example of the small sawmilling bush communities that were established in forests before improved transport of whole logs, which made such communities redundant. Wooleybah provides physical evidence of the role Aboriginal people played in the forestry industry, particularly in the Pilliga. It also provides evidence of the types of places where Aboriginal people found work. The Wooleybah school is a representative example of a small bush school, many of which were established by the NSW Education Department throughout country New South Wales.
