= Leichhardt County =

Leichhardt New South Wales
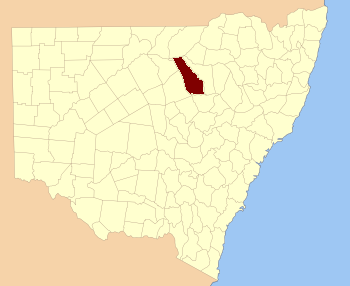
- Location in New South Wales
Lands administrative divisions around Leichhardt:
Narran	Finch	Baradine
Clyde	Leichhardt	Baradine
Gregory	Ewenmar	Gowen

Leichhardt County is one of the 141 cadastral divisions of New South Wales. It is located south of the Namoi River and includes land on both sides of the Castlereagh River, including Coonamble.

Leichhardt County was named in honour of the Prussian naturalist and explorer Friedrich Wilhelm Ludwig Leichhardt (1813–1848).

== Parishes within the county ==
A full list of parishes found within this county; their current LGA and mapping coordinates to the approximate centre of each location is as follows:

Parish	LGA	Coordinates
Aberfoyle	Walgett Shire	30°05′54″S 147°50′04″E
Amos	Walgett Shire	30°13′54″S 147°54′04″E
Baronne	Coonamble Shire	31°11′54″S 148°40′04″E
Bimble	Coonamble Shire	30°51′54″S 148°24′04″E
Bogewang	Walgett Shire	30°13′54″S 147°44′04″E
Borgara	Walgett Shire	30°11′54″S 147°46′04″E
Brewan	Walgett Shire	30°07′54″S 147°36′04″E
Buchanan	Coonamble Shire	31°05′54″S 148°48′04″E
Budgeon	Coonamble Shire	31°07′54″S 148°18′04″E
Bulgah	Coonamble Shire	30°27′54″S 148°20′04″E
Bulgogar	Coonamble Shire	30°41′54″S 148°29′04″E
Bullarora	Coonamble Shire	30°37′54″S 148°20′04″E
Calga	Coonamble Shire	31°00′54″S 148°42′04″E
Cambara	Coonamble Shire	31°11′54″S 148°18′04″E
Campbell	Coonamble Shire	30°47′54″S 148°28′04″E
Carrabear	Coonamble Shire	30°57′54″S 148°02′04″E
Carwell	Coonamble Shire	31°12′54″S 148°45′04″E
Castlereagh	Walgett Shire	30°17′54″S 147°54′04″E
Collinouie	Coonamble Shire	30°27′54″S 148°24′04″E
Colmia	Walgett Shire	30°15′54″S 148°04′04″E
Colomy	Walgett Shire	30°19′54″S 147°58′04″E
Conimbia	Coonamble Shire	30°41′54″S 148°04′04″E
Cooeyah Warrah	Coonamble Shire	30°27′54″S 148°14′04″E
Coonamble	Coonamble Shire	30°57′54″S 148°20′04″E
Coonamoona	Coonamble Shire	30°55′08″S 148°37′08″E
Dahomey	Walgett Shire	30°27′54″S 148°08′04″E
Devon	Walgett Shire	30°21′54″S 147°54′04″E
Dinoa	Coonamble Shire	30°51′54″S 148°14′04″E
Edgeroi	Coonamble Shire	30°57′54″S 148°08′04″E
Ellis	Coonamble Shire	31°07′54″S 148°30′04″E
Elongery	Coonamble Shire	31°12′54″S 148°55′04″E
Eulah	Coonamble Shire	31°03′54″S 148°14′04″E
Euroka	Walgett Shire	30°05′54″S 148°06′04″E
Geelnoy	Coonamble Shire	30°45′54″S 148°46′04″E
Gelambula	Coonamble Shire	30°51′54″S 148°28′04″E
Gidgerygah	Walgett Shire	30°21′54″S 147°48′04″E
Gidginbilla	Walgett Shire	30°23′54″S 148°14′04″E
Gilgooma	Coonamble Shire	30°46′39″S 148°32′16″E
Gilguldry	Coonamble Shire	31°11′54″S 148°22′04″E
Gilwarny	Walgett Shire	30°25′54″S 147°50′04″E
Goorianawa	Coonamble Shire	31°06′55″S 148°52′40″E
Gungalman North	Coonamble Shire	30°25′54″S 147°58′04″E
Gungalman	Coonamble Shire	30°31′54″S 148°02′04″E
Gunna	Walgett Shire	30°11′54″S 148°10′04″E
Keadool	Coonamble Shire	30°25′54″S 148°22′04″E
Kidgar	Walgett Shire	30°15′54″S 147°50′04″E
Magometon	Coonamble Shire	31°03′54″S 148°35′04″E
Matouree	Coonamble Shire	30°25′54″S 148°18′04″E
Mogil	Coonamble Shire	30°51′54″S 148°04′04″E
Moolambong	Coonamble Shire	31°07′54″S 148°24′04″E
Moora	Walgett Shire	30°17′54″S 148°14′04″E
Moorambilla	Coonamble Shire	30°57′54″S 148°24′04″E
Mourabie	Walgett Shire	30°07′54″S 147°44′04″E
Mowlma	Coonamble Shire	30°41′54″S 148°10′04″E
Mundare	Coonamble Shire	30°57′54″S 148°30′04″E
Mundare	Coonamble Shire	30°59′54″S 148°32′04″E
Mungery	Coonamble Shire	31°05′54″S 148°40′04″E
Munna Munna	Coonamble Shire	30°31′54″S 147°56′04″E
Murraiman	Coonamble Shire	30°58′26″S 148°42′27″E
Narratigah	Coonamble Shire	31°00′54″S 148°48′04″E
Nebea	Coonamble Shire	30°51′22″S 148°33′54″E
Nedgera	Coonamble Shire	30°27′54″S 147°56′04″E
Neinby	Coonamble Shire	31°03′54″S 148°06′04″E
Nelgowrie	Coonamble Shire	30°53′54″S 148°10′04″E
Nimbia	Coonamble Shire	30°41′54″S 147°56′04″E
Ningear	Coonamble Shire	30°47′54″S 148°08′04″E
Noonbar	Coonamble Shire	30°59′54″S 148°35′04″E
Nugal	Walgett Shire	30°21′54″S 148°05′04″E
Oural	Coonamble Shire	30°35′54″S 148°08′04″E
Parmiduan	Coonamble Shire	31°08′54″S 148°51′04″E
Pier Pier	Coonamble Shire	30°35′54″S 147°54′04″E
Quanda Quanda	Coonamble Shire	31°06′54″S 148°46′04″E
Quonmoona	Coonamble Shire	31°01′54″S 148°18′04″E
Sussex	Walgett Shire	30°09′54″S 147°58′04″E
Tahrone	Coonamble Shire	30°43′54″S 148°22′04″E
Tallegar	Coonamble Shire	31°05′54″S 148°14′04″E
Terembone	Coonamble Shire	30°37′54″S 148°41′04″E
Teridgerie	Coonamble Shire	30°55′54″S 149°48′04″E
Thara	Coonamble Shire	30°37′54″S 148°26′04″E
Toloora	Walgett Shire	30°09′54″S 148°04′04″E
Tooloon	Coonamble Shire	30°57′54″S 148°14′04″E
Toora	Coonamble Shire	30°33′54″S 148°02′04″E
Trielmon	Walgett Shire	30°15′54″S 147°58′04″E
Ularbie	Walgett Shire	30°03′54″S 148°00′04″E
Ulundry	Coonamble Shire	31°12′54″S 148°30′04″E
Urawilkie	Coonamble Shire	30°50′28″S 148°42′42″E
Waddiwong	Walgett Shire	30°07′54″S 147°54′04″E
Walcha Council	Coonamble Shire	30°36′54″S 148°35′04″E
Walla Walla	Coonamble Shire	31°08′54″S 148°34′04″E
Wambelong	Coonamble Shire	31°12′54″S 148°50′04″E
Warraba East	Coonamble Shire	30°42′54″S 148°39′04″E
Warrabah	Coonamble Shire	30°55′54″S 148°02′04″E
Warragan	Walgett Shire	30°17′54″S 148°08′04″E
Warren Downs	Walgett Shire	30°17′54″S 147°44′04″E
Warrena	Coonamble Shire	30°57′54″S 148°28′04″E
Weetaliba	Coonamble Shire	30°42′54″S 148°34′04″E
Willaga	Coonamble Shire	30°47′15″S 148°38′33″E
Wingadee	Coonamble Shire	30°09′54″S 148°12′04″E
Wingadee	Coonamble Shire	30°27′54″S 148°12′04″E
Winnaba	Coonamble Shire	30°29′54″S 148°34′04″E
Woolingar	Coonamble Shire	30°39′54″S 148°14′04″E
Worinjerong	Coonamble Shire	31°12′54″S 148°34′04″E
Yarragoora	Coonamble Shire	30°45′54″S 148°14′04″E
Yarrayin	Coonamble Shire	30°47′54″S 148°02′04″E
Yoee	Coonamble Shire	30°51′54″S 148°20′04″E
Youendah	Walgett Shire	30°03′54″S 147°56′04″E
Yuma	Coonamble Shire	30°47′54″S 148°22′04″E
