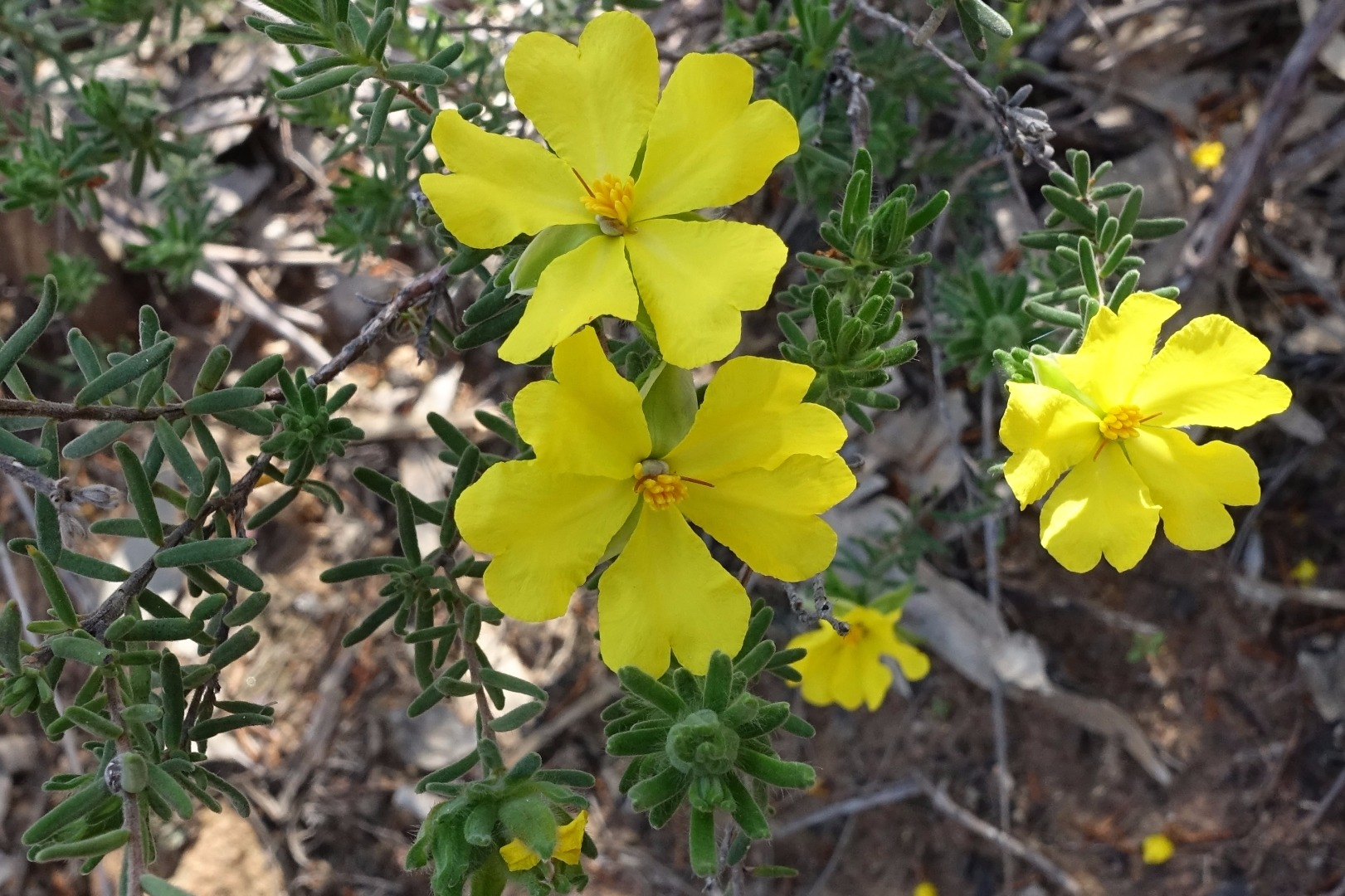
- Near Baradine

Scientific classification
- Kingdom: Plantae
- Clade: Tracheophytes
- Clade: Angiosperms
- Clade: Eudicots
- Order: Dilleniales
- Family: Dilleniaceae
- Genus: Hibbertia
- Species: H. covenyana

Binomial name
- Hibbertia covenyana B.J.Conn

= Hibbertia covenyana =

Species of flowering plant

Hibbertia covenyana is a species of flowering plant in the family Dilleniaceae and is endemic to New South Wales. It is an erect or semi-prostrate shrub with hairy foliage, oblong leaves and yellow flowers with seven to ten stamens arranged on one side of the two carpels.

== Description ==
Hibbertia covenyana is an erect or semi-prostrate shrub that typically grows to a height of up to 50 cm (20 in), its leaves and branches densely hairy with both long whitish and star-shaped hairs. The leaves are oblong, 4–10 mm (0.16–0.39 in) long and 1–2 mm (0.039–0.079 in) wide with the edges rolled under. The flowers are arranged in leaf axils on a pedicel 10–15 mm (0.39–0.59 in) long with bracts 3.5–6.5 mm (0.14–0.26 in) long. The sepals are egg-shaped, 7.5–10 mm (0.30–0.39 in) long and densely hairy on the outer surface. The petals are yellow, spatula-shaped, 10–14 mm (0.39–0.55 in) long and there are seven to ten stamens on one side of the two densely hairy carpels. Flowering occurs from September to November.

== Taxonomy ==
Hibbertia covenyana was first formally described in 1990 by Barry Conn in the journal Muelleria from specimens collected near the road between Narrabri and Coonabarabran in 1976. The specific epithet (covenyana) honours Robert Coveny who collected the type specimens.

== Distribution and habitat ==
This hibbertia grows scattered locations in open forest, mainly in the Pilliga Scrub in central northern New South Wales.

== See also ==
- List of Hibbertia species
