= Meit =

Meit may refer to:

- Maydh, a city in Somalia
- Meit (Baradine County parish), in Wales, UK
- Conrad Meit, sculptor
- Meit Fohlin, Swedish politician

== See also ==
- Meite
- Mait (disambiguation)
- Mate (disambiguation)
