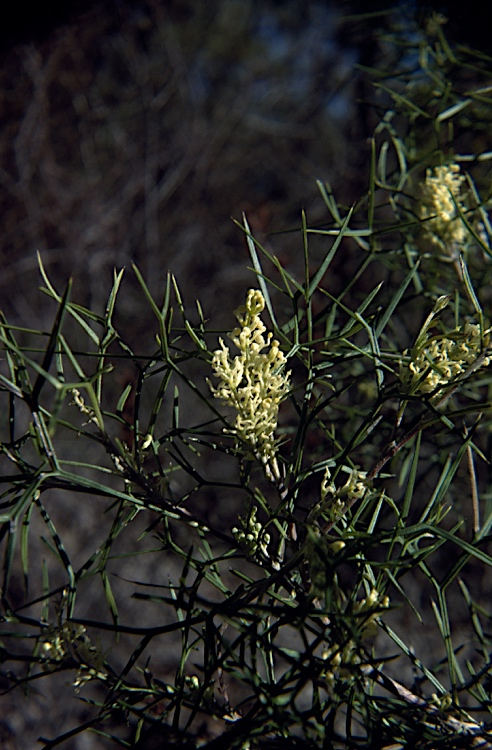
- In the Pilliga Scrub

Scientific classification
- Kingdom: Plantae
- Clade: Tracheophytes
- Clade: Angiosperms
- Clade: Eudicots
- Order: Proteales
- Family: Proteaceae
- Genus: Grevillea
- Species: G. triternata

Binomial name
- Grevillea triternata R.Br.

Synonyms
- Anadenia triternata Heynh. nom. inval., pro syn.; Hakea triternata (R.Br.) Christenh. & Byng

= Grevillea triternata =

Species of shrub endemic to Australia

Grevillea triternata is species of flowering plant in the family Proteaceae and is endemic to New South Wales. It is a dense, compact shrub with divided leaves, the end lobes sharply pointed, linear to narrowly triangular, and cylindrical clusters of white flowers with a cream-coloured to pale yellow style.

== Description ==
Grevillea triternata is a dense, compact shrub that typically grows to a height of 0.2–1 m (7.9 in – 3 ft 3.4 in). Its leaves are divided, 30–105 mm (1.2–4.1 in) long, with 3 to 5 spreading lobes that are usually divided again, the end lobes sharply pointed, linear to narrowly triangular, 7–47 mm (0.28–1.85 in) long and 0.8–2.8 mm (0.031–0.110 in) wide. The edges of the leaves are usually rolled under, concealing most of the lower surface. The flowers are arranged in cylindrical or narrowly conical clusters on a rachis 10–28 mm (0.39–1.10 in) long, the flowers nearer the base of the rachis flowering first. The flowers are white with a cream-coloured to pale yellow style, the pistil 3.8–5.0 mm (0.15–0.20 in) long. Flowering occurs from August to December, and the fruit is a silky-hairy follicle 6.5–9.5 mm (0.26–0.37 in) long.

== Taxonomy ==
Grevillea triternata was first formally described in 1830 by Robert Brown in Supplementum primum Prodromi florae Novae Hollandiae from specimens collected on mountains near Port Jackson. The specific epithet (triternata) means "divided into three parts", referring to the leaves.

== Distribution and habitat ==
This grevillea grows in forest and woodland in sandy soil in scattered populations in New South Wales, from the upper Hunter River and Bathurst to Coonabarabran and the Pilliga Scrub as well as on the Northern Tablelands.

== See also ==
- List of Grevillea species
