= Quegobla (Baradine County parish) =

Civil parish in Australia

Quegobla is a civil parish of Baradine County, New South Wales.

It is located in Narrabri Shire at 30°29′54″S 148°54′04″E and is within the Pilliga National Park.
