= Yearinan, New South Wales =

Coordinates: 31°10′54″S 149°11′05″E

Yearinan is an unbounded locality in north-western New South Wales, Australia, within the locality of Bugaldie. A railway station on the closed Gwabegar railway line was located there between 1923 and 1974.

| Preceding station | Former services | Following station |
|---|---|---|
| Bugaldie towards Gwabegar | Gwabegar Line | Coonabarabran towards Wallerawang |
