= Wittenbra railway station =

Former railway station in New South Wales, Australia

Coordinates: 31°02′45″S 149°05′15″E

Wittenbra is a location on the now closed Gwabegar railway line in north-western New South Wales, Australia. A station was located there between 1923 and 1960.

Preceding station	Former services	Following station
Baradine towards Gwabegar	Gwabegar Line	Bugaldie towards Wallerawang
