= Richard Kingsford =

Richard Kingsford may refer to:

- Richard Ash Kingsford (1821–1902), mayor of Brisbane and Cairns, member of the Queensland state parliament, Australia
- Richard Kingsford (ecologist), environmental/biological expert and river ecologist
