= Baradine County =

Baradine New South Wales
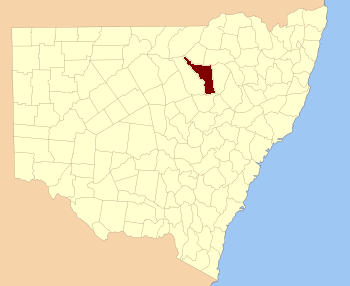
- Location in New South Wales
Lands administrative divisions around Baradine:
Finch	Denham	Jamison
Leichhardt	Baradine	White
Gowen	Gowen	Napier

Baradine County is one of the 141 cadastral divisions of New South Wales. It is bounded in the north by the Namoi River, and includes the land south to Coonabarabran, which is on its southern edge. This includes land on both sides of the Baradine Creek and the town of Baradine.

Baradine is believed to be derived from a local Aboriginal word.

== Parishes within the county ==
A full list of parishes found within this county; their current LGA and mapping coordinates to the approximate centre of each location is as follows:

Parish	LGA	Coordinates
Badham	Warrumbungle Shire	30°57′54″S 149°20′04″E
Baradine	Warrumbungle Shire	30°55′33″S 149°02′34″E
Barwon	Warrumbungle Shire	30°59′54″S 148°55′04″E
Berigerie	Warrumbungle Shire	30°51′54″S 148°56′04″E
Berrybah	Walgett Shire	30°19′54″S 148°34′04″E
Boorimah	Narrabri Shire	30°04′54″S 149°37′04″E
Bugaldie	Warrumbungle Shire	31°05′54″S 149°09′04″E
Bullerawa	Narrabri Shire	30°21′54″S 149°05′04″E
Bulliwy	Walgett Shire	30°30′54″S 148°47′04″E
Bundill	Narrabri Shire	30°10′54″S 149°32′05″E
Bungle Gully	Walgett Shire	30°17′54″S 148°30′04″E
Carlo	Warrumbungle Shire	31°04′54″S 149°20′04″E
Ceelnoy	Warrumbungle Shire	30°39′54″S 148°52′04″E
Coolangoola	Warrumbungle Shire	30°51′54″S 149°10′04″E
Coomore	Narrabri Shire	30°42′54″S 149°13′04″E
Coomore South	Narrabri Shire	30°46′54″S 149°14′04″E
Cooper	Warrumbungle Shire	31°01′54″S 149°15′04″E
Cox	Walgett Shire	30°19′54″S 148°26′04″E
Cubbo	Narrabri Shire	30°34′54″S 149°07′04″E
Culnooy	Walgett Shire	30°31′54″S 148°36′04″E
Cumberdoon	Walgett Shire	30°13′54″S 148°22′04″E
Cumbil	Narrabri Shire	30°46′54″S 149°09′04″E
Dandry	Warrumbungle Shire	31°09′54″S 149°18′04″E
Dangar	Walgett Shire	30°18′54″S 148°40′04″E
Denevoli	Walgett Shire	30°24′54″S 148°31′04″E
Doyle	Walgett Shire	30°07′54″S 148°16′04″E
Dubbo	Narrabri Shire	30°26′54″S 149°06′04″E
Dunwerian	Narrabri Shire	30°37′54″S 149°12′04″E
Etoo	Narrabri Shire	30°31′54″S 149°03′04″E
Euligal	Narrabri Shire	30°41′54″S 149°05′04″E
Evans	Walgett Shire	30°19′54″S 148°20′04″E
Gidgenbar	Coonamble Shire	30°39′54″S 148°46′04″E
Ginee	Walgett Shire	30°33′54″S 148°41′04″E
Goangra	Walgett Shire	30°09′54″S 148°22′04″E
Goorianawa	Warrumbungle Shire	31°03′54″S 148°55′04″E
Gora	Warrumbungle Shire	31°04′54″S 149°00′04″E
Gwabegar	Narrabri Shire	30°35′54″S 148°52′04″E
Hall	Warrumbungle Shire	30°57′54″S 149°05′04″E
Jamalong	Walgett Shire	30°25′54″S 148°26′04″E
Kenebri	Warrumbungle Shire	30°49′54″S 148°58′04″E
Leslie	Warrumbungle Shire	31°11′54″S 148°59′04″E
Mackenzie	Warrumbungle Shire	30°46′54″S 149°04′04″E
Mcfarlane	Walgett Shire	30°13′54″S 148°16′04″E
Meit	Walgett Shire	30°25′54″S 148°49′04″E
Merebene	Warrumbungle Shire	30°39′54″S 148°58′04″E
Merimborough	Narrabri Shire	30°29′54″S 149°12′04″E
Merritombea	Walgett Shire	30°03′54″S 148°08′04″E
Midgee	Walgett Shire	30°29′54″S 148°37′04″E
Milchomi	Walgett Shire	30°23′54″S 148°38′04″E
Miller	Warrumbungle Shire	30°44′54″S 148°58′04″E
Minnon	Narrabri Shire	30°26′54″S 149°01′04″E
Moglewit	Narrabri Shire	30°21′54″S 149°00′04″E
Muttama	Walgett Shire	30°30′54″S 148°31′04″E
Newman	Walgett Shire	30°19′54″S 148°45′04″E
Orr	Warrumbungle Shire	31°00′55″S 149°30′04″E
Parsons	Warrumbungle Shire	30°59′54″S 149°08′04″E
Pilliga	Walgett Shire	30°19′54″S 148°50′04″E
Quegobla	Narrabri Shire	30°29′54″S 148°54′04″E
Rundle	Warrumbungle Shire	31°08′54″S 149°03′04″E
Tallama	Warrumbungle Shire	30°50′54″S 149°05′04″E
Talluba	Narrabri Shire	30°20′54″S 148°56′04″E
Teni	Narrabri Shire	30°25′54″S 148°54′04″E
Terembone	Coonamble Shire	30°38′50″S 148°40′12″E
Teridgerie	Warrumbungle Shire	30°48′11″S 148°53′37″E
Tunis	Narrabri Shire	30°21′54″S 149°10′04″E
Ukerbarley	Warrumbungle Shire	31°14′54″S 149°08′04″E
Ulambie	Walgett Shire	30°05′54″S 148°12′04″E
Urawilkie	Coonamble Shire	30°42′54″S 148°45′04″E
Wambadule	Walgett Shire	30°24′54″S 148°43′04″E
Wangan	Narrabri Shire	30°34′54″S 148°58′04″E
Wheoh	Warrumbungle Shire	31°14′54″S 149°04′04″E
White	Warrumbungle Shire	30°43′54″S 148°52′04″E
Wittenbra	Warrumbungle Shire	31°02′54″S 149°14′04″E
Worigal	Warrumbungle Shire	30°56′54″S 149°09′04″E
Yarraman	Coonamble Shire	30°33′54″S 148°47′04″E
Yarren	Walgett Shire	30°31′54″S 148°43′04″E
Yarrigan	Warrumbungle Shire	30°59′54″S 149°00′04″E
Yearanan	Warrumbungle Shire	31°08′54″S 148°59′04″E
