= Bugaldie, New South Wales =

Coordinates: 31°06′55″S 149°06′04″E

Bugaldie is a locality in north-western New South Wales, Australia. A railway station on the now closed Gwabegar railway line was located there between 1923 and 1976.

Preceding station	Former services	Following station
Wittenbra towards Gwabegar	Gwabegar Line	Yearinan towards Wallerawang

== Population ==
In the 2016 Census, there were 144 people in Bugaldie. 80.6% of people were born in Australia and 96.4% of people spoke only English at home.
