= Urawilkie (Baradine County parish) =

Urawilkie, New South Wales is a remote Rural locality of New South Wales and a civil Parish of Baradine County.

The economy of the parish is a mix of forestry and agriculture with farming in the south of the parish and the northern portion taken by the Pilliga forest.
