= Euligal (Baradine County parish) =

Euligal located at 30°41′54″S 149°05′04″E in Narrabri Shire is a civil parish of Baradine County, New South Wales. Euligal is in the Pilliga forest.
