= Pilliga (Baradine County parish) =

Civil parish of Baradine County, New South Wales, Australia

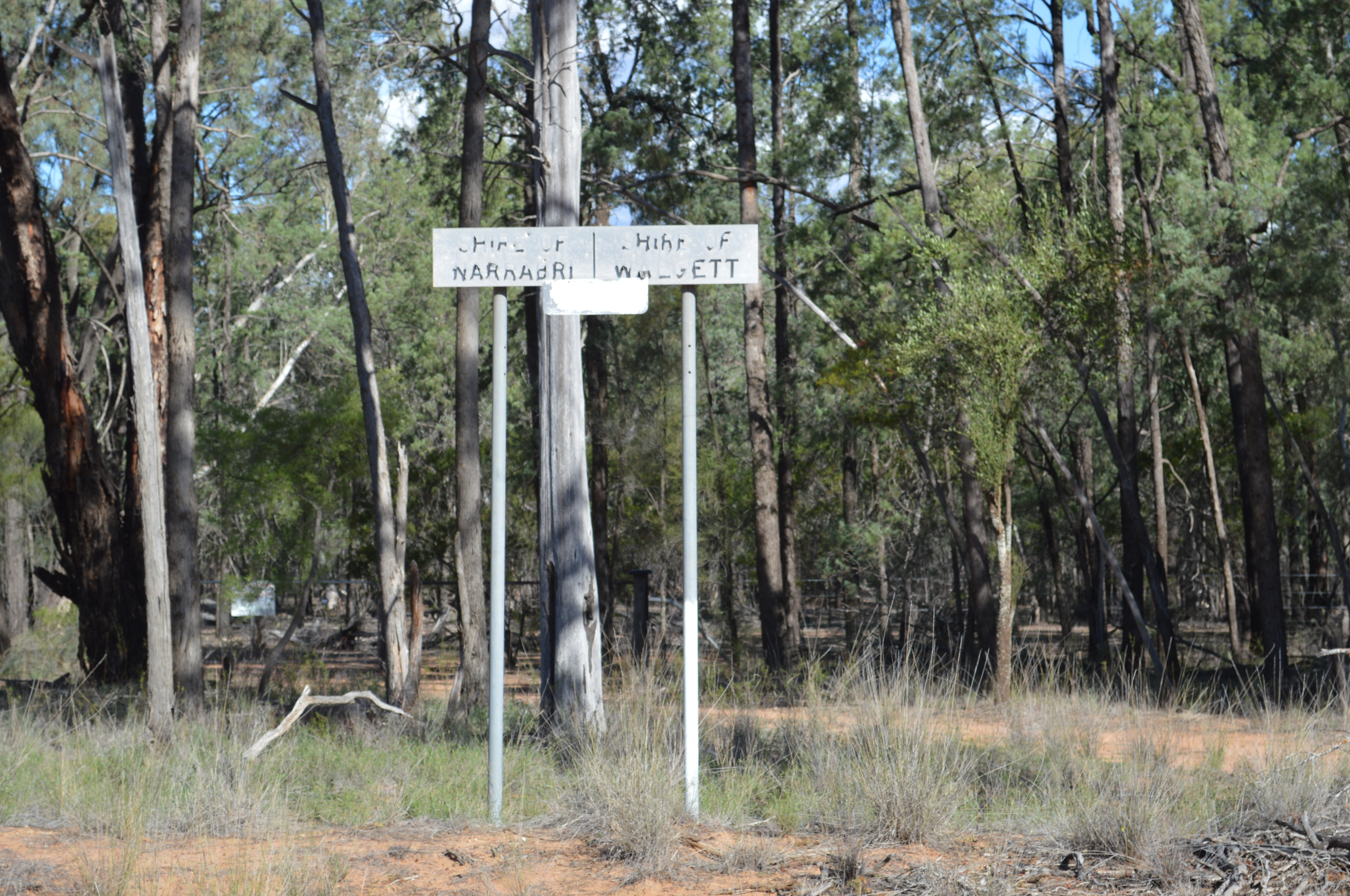
Pilliga Parish forest

Pilliga Parish (Baradine County) is a civil parish of Baradine County, New South Wales.

Pilliga Parish is located in Walgett Shire 30°19′54″S 148°50′04″E on the Namoi River. The only town of the parish is Pilliga, New South Wales.
