= Baradine =

- Town
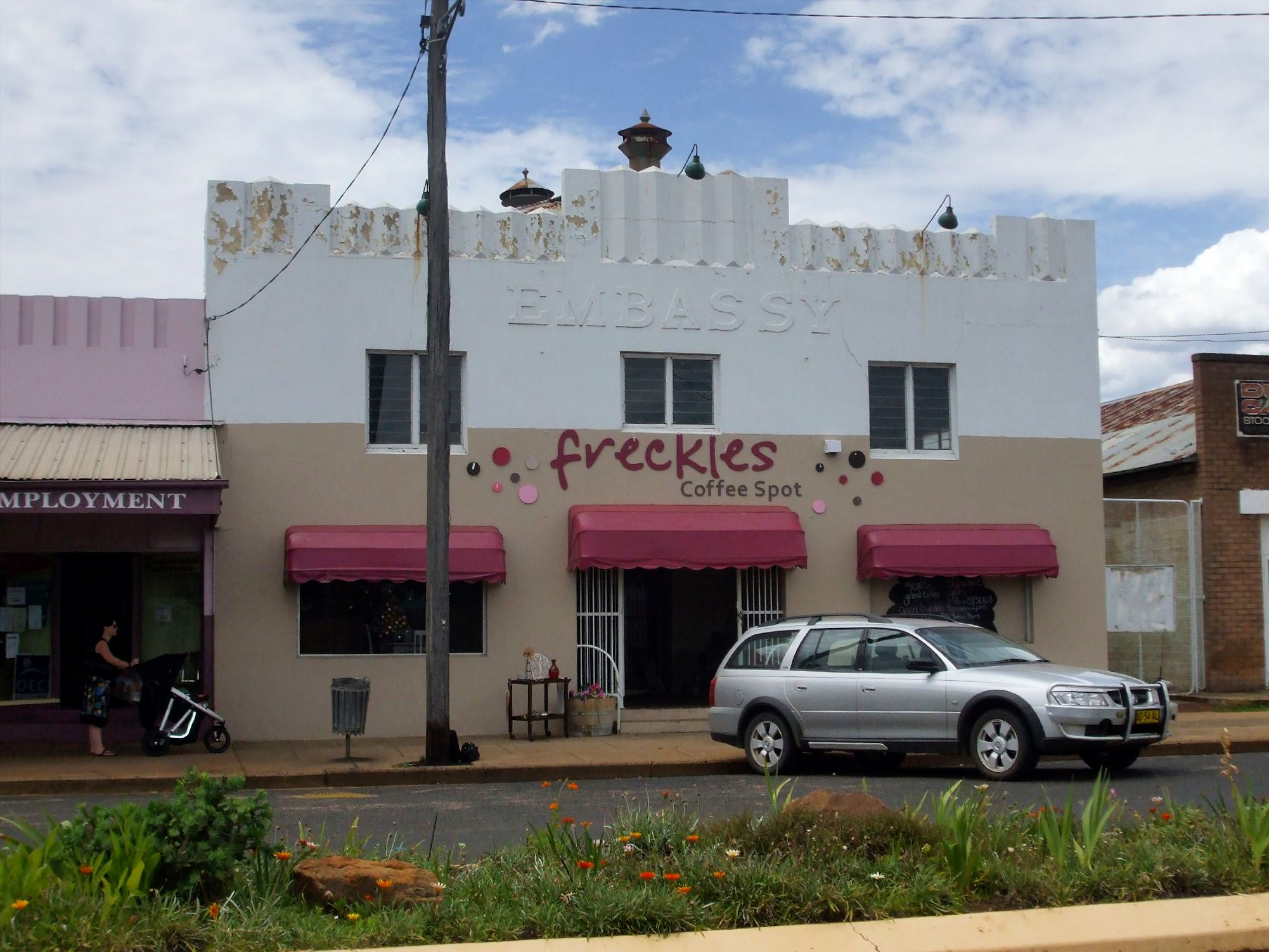
- The former Embassy Theatre, now home to a coffee shop

- Coordinates: 30°57′0″S 149°04′0″E
- Country: Australia
- State: New South Wales
- LGA: Warrumbungle Shire
- Location: 491 km (305 mi) NW of Sydney; 71 km (44 mi) E of Coonamble; 46 km (29 mi) NW of Coonabarabran

Government
  - State electorate: Barwon
  - Federal division: Parkes
- Elevation: 300 m (980 ft)

Population
  - Total: 586 (2021 census)
- Postcode: 2396
- Mean max temp: 23.7 °C (74.7 °F)
- Mean min temp: 7.4 °C (45.3 °F)
- Annual rainfall: 588.9 mm (23.19 in)

Baradine is a small town in north western New South Wales, Australia. At the 2021 census, Baradine had a population of 593.

Baradine is located on the Coonabarabran-Pilliga road, about midway between Coonabarabran and Pilliga. It is adjacent to Baradine Creek which flows intermittently northwards from the Warrumbungles.

== History ==
The area was originally inhabited by the Gamilaroi tribe of Aboriginal peoples, and first settled by Europeans in the late 1830s and was proclaimed a village in 1865. Baradine's name appears to have been derived from an Aboriginal word for "red wallaby".

European occupation of the Baradine district commenced in the 1830s with the establishment by Andrew Brown of a pastoral run named 'Barradean'. The run was taken up on behalf of James Walker of Wallerawang, and operated as an outstation of the 'Goorianawa' run (near the head of the Castlereagh River). The Walker family held the 'Barradean' run until 1867 when it was sold to Edward Cox. Other early landholders in the area included Charles Fitsimmons at 'Bugaldie Yaminginba' and James Evans at 'Dandry' in the 1840s.

In the early 1860s a settlement was surveyed on the west bank of Barradine Creek on a portion of the 'Barradean' run, at the convergence of tracks connecting local pastoral runs and used as a camping ground for teamsters. In April 1862 a 40-acre reserve was proclaimed at the location. Land sales began to be held in 1865 and by 1866 the village of Baradine had thirty inhabitants. The first hotel at the village was established by Henry Border in the 1860s.

Baradine Post Office opened on 1 January 1867. The telegraph office was open at Baradine in August 1876, "to the great satisfaction of the residents".

In 1899 the settlement of Baradine was described as "a couple of hotels, a school, store, and post and telegraph office, with a dozen or so of dwellings". In the vicinity of the village were "a considerable number of selections". Baradine was at "the edge of an immense tract of forest country" stretching to Boggabri to the east and Pillaga to the north-west.

Baradine is located on the Gwabegar railway line, which was closed north of Binnaway, New South Wales in 2005. The railway reached Baradine in 1923 and the station was closed in 1985. By rail, Baradine is 563 kilometres from Sydney. Baradine is directly linked by road to Coonabarabran, Walgett, and Coonamble which is 68 km to the west from Baradine.

Historical population
Year	Pop.	±%
1966	751	—
1971	730	−2.8%
1976	756	+3.6%
1981	723	−4.4%
1986	656	−9.3%
1991	657	+0.2%
1996	609	−7.3%
2001	696	+14.3%
2006	593	−14.8%
2011	762	+28.5%
2016	626	−17.8%
2021	586	−6.4%
Source: Australian Bureau of Statistics data.

== The Pilliga Scrub ==
Baradine is the administrative centre of the Pilliga Scrub, whose history is documented in A Million Wild Acres by local farmer Eric Rolls in the 1970s.

The State forests and National Park reserves of the Pilliga are part of a vast and unusual woodland, famous for its cypress pine, its broom plains, its vivid spring wildflowers, its koalas and a rich supply of honey-bearing flora. In a state where eucalypt forests dominate the landscape, the Pilliga offers scenery that is distinctly different.

The State forests and National Park reserves of the Pilliga stretch across the flat, sandy plains between the Warrumbungle Mountains near Coonabarabran in the south and the Namoi River near Narrabri in the north, the single largest area of continuous forest west of the Great Dividing Range. The forests have a long history of harvesting for termite-resistant white cypress pine and durable ironbark.

== Today ==
Baradine is in the Warrumbungle Shire Local Government Area, centred in Coonabarabran. It is a really friendly town with much to offer both visitors and locals. Baradine has two hotels with accommodation, a great caravan park with group cabin accommodation, Bed & Breakfast, two cafes, bowling & recreation club (with squash courts), skate park opened 2020 at the playing fields, an amazing National Parks and Wildlife Discovery Centre, a mechanical workshop/fuel station, a hospital with attached medical centre, a CRT rural supplies merchant, a fantastic IGA supermarket, a chemist, swimming pool (seasonal), lively Catholic and Anglican churches with regular services, police station, post office, pre-school and two schools - St John's Catholic Primary School and Baradine Central School. Active Rural Fire Service and State Emergency Service, plus Country Women's Association, Progress Association and Keeping Place run by the Baradine Local Aboriginal Land Council.

Baradine Central School provides for children from Kindergarten to Year 12. Students are drawn from the immediate township, surrounding properties and the villages of Kenebri and Gwabegar. Their Agriculture Program produces many successful entries in the surrounding local agricultural shows.

Baradine is located in the heart of the Pilliga forest, known for harvesting the Australian white cypress-pine which is a termite-resistant timber. This activity has been reduced as large parts of the forest are now fully conserved. The local area is a bird watching paradise, and local attractions such as the Sculptures in the Scrub and the Pilliga Bore Bath (70km north) mean that travelers find much to do in this tiny town. Baradine has a proud agricultural history, with many farming and grazing areas in the district.

Baradine Magpies play in the Castlereagh Cup rugby league competition.

== Churches ==
- Anglican: St Andrew's
- Catholic: St John's

== Baradine railway station ==
Preceding station	Former services	Following station
Kenebri towards Gwabegar	Gwabegar Line	Wittenbra towards Wallerawang

The station was closed in 1985 and demolished shortly afterwards.

== Notable people ==
- Craig Emerson, Australian economist and former politician
- Tony Johnston, Australian television presenter, producer and radio broadcaster
