= MAIT =

Mait may refer to:

- Mait (given name), an Estonian name
- Maydh, a town in Somalia
- Plumber's mait, an alternative name for plumber's putty

MAIT may refer to:

- Maharaja Agrasen Institute of Technology, in New Delhi, India
- Mucosal associated invariant T cells, a T cell type
- Martial Arts Instructor-Trainers, a unit belonging to the Marine Corps Martial Arts Program
- Multidisciplinary Accident Investigation Teams of the California Highway Patrol

== See also ==
- Meit (disambiguation)
