= Kenebri, New South Wales =

Kenebri New South Wales
- Coordinates: 30°46′S 149°02′E
- Population: 142 (2006 census)
- Postcode(s): 2396
- Location: 527 km (327 mi) NW of Sydney; 71 km (44 mi) N of Coonabarabran; 25 km (16 mi) N of Baradine
- LGA(s): Warrumbungle Shire
- State electorate(s): Barwon
- Federal division(s): Parkes

Kenebri is a locality in northern New South Wales, Australia.

Kenebri is located between Baradine and Gwabegar on the road from Coonabarabran.

The Gwabegar railway line reached Kenebri in 1923 and a station and siding were opened. Kenebri was the source of rail sleepers. Kenebri Post Office opened on 1 March 1929 and closed in 1984.

The Gwabegar line was closed north of Binnaway in 2005. Kenebri station was located 564 kilometres (350 mi) by rail from Central railway station.

Kenebri is located in the Pilliga forest and there were timber harvesting activities there. Kenebri also had a public school at one time, which is now closed. The nearest extant town to Kenebri is Baradine.

At the 2006 census, Kenebri and the surrounding area had a population of 142.

Preceding station	Former services	Following station
Merebene towards Gwabegar	Gwabegar Line	Baradine towards Wallerawang
