= Ulambie (Baradine County parish) =

- Coordinates: 30°01′0″S 148°07′0″E
- Country: Australia
- State: New South Wales
- Region: New England
- LGA: Walgett Shire
- Location: 691 km (429 mi) NW of Sydney; 279 km (173 mi) N of Dubbo; 186 km (116 mi) W of Narrabri; 117 km (73 mi) N of Coonamble; 136 km (85 mi) E of Brewarrina

Government
  - State electorate: Barwon
  - Federal division: Parkes
- Elevation: 133 m (436 ft)
- Postcode: 2832
- County: Baradine
- Mean max temp: 26.9 °C (80.4 °F)
- Mean min temp: 12.5 °C (54.5 °F)
- Annual rainfall: 480.6 mm (18.92 in)

Ulambie is a rural locality of Walgett Shire and a civil parish of Baradine County, New South Wales. Ulambie is on the Namoi River at 30°05′54″S 148°12′04″E between Walgett, New South Wales and Come By Chance.
