= Eric Rolls =

Australian farmer and environmentalist (1923–2007)

Eric Rolls AM
- Born: Eric Charles Rolls; 25 April 1923; Grenfell, New South Wales
- Died: 31 October 2007 (aged 84); Camden Haven
- Occupations: writer, environmentalist, farmer, historian
- Relatives: Joan Stephenson (wife); Elaine van Kempen (wife)
- Writing career
- Language: English
- Notable awards: Greening Australia Journalism Award Member of the Order of Australia; Captain Cook Bicentenary Award for Non-Fiction; C. J. Dennis Prize; The Age Book of the Year; John Franklin Award; Landcare Media Award; Braille Book of the Year Talking Book of the Year

Eric Charles Rolls AM (1923–2007) was an Australian writer.

== Life ==
Rolls was born in Grenfell, New South Wales in 1923, and died in Camden Haven in 2007. He attended the Sydney selective school of Fort Street High, before serving in the second world war in New Guinea, as a signaller. On his return from the war, he took up land in 1946 in the north-west of New South Wales (east of the Pilliga and later at "Cumberdeen", Baradine) and farmed and wrote, often spending long periods in Sydney, researching at the Mitchell Library.

He had two happy marriages, the first with Joan Stephenson and after her death in 1985, a second with Elaine van Kempen (1937–2019), whom he met when she came to work for him in 1985 as his research assistant, and married in 1988.

== Work ==
One of his most celebrated works is A Million Wild Acres of which Tom Griffiths (emeritus professor of history at the Australian National University) wrote:

"(Les) Murray considered A Million Wild Acres to be like an extended, crafted campfire yarn in which everyone has the dignity of a name, and in which the animals and plants have equal status with humans in the making of history: “It is not purely human history, but ecological history he gives us… one which interrelates the human and non-human dimensions so intimately.” Murray compared its discursive and laconic tone to the Icelandic sagas. Through his democratic recognition of all life, Rolls enchanted the forest and presented us with a speaking land, a sentient country raucous with sound."

Rolls' papers and sound recordings, including an interview with Hazel de Berg, are held by the National Library of Australia."Miss Strawberry's Purse" was his most popular verse.

== Publications ==
(incomplete)

=== Poetry ===
- 1967 – Sheaf tosser and other poems
- 1977 – The green mosaic : memories of New Guinea

=== Books ===
- 1981 – A million wild acres : 200 years of man and an Australian forest
- 1984 – The river : a chronicle of life on the land / illustrated by Marianne Yamaguchi.
- 1984 – They all ran wild : the story of pests on the land in Australia (13 editions)
- 1984/1998 – Celebration of the senses
- 1992/1993 – Sojourners : the epic story of China's centuries-old relationship with Australia : flowers and the wide sea
- 1996 – Citizens : flowers and the wide sea : continuing the epic story of China's centuries-old relationship with Australia
- 2002 – Visions of Australia : impressions of the landscape 1642–1910
- 2011 – A million wild acres : 200 years of man and an Australian forest/ foreword by Les Murray

== Eric Rolls Memorial Lecture ==
Funded by his widow, Elaine van Kempen, the Eric Rolls Memorial Lecture was inaugurated in 2010 as a biannual lecture.

2010: "Fire in 1788: The closest ally" by Bill Gammage

2012: "A Meander Down a River or Two: How Water Defines Our Continent and Its Future" by Richard Kingsford

2014: "The Landscape Behind the Landscape" by Nicholas Rothwell

2016: "Gifts from China" by Nicholas Jose

2018: "Mother Earth" by Bruce Pascoe

== Honours ==
- Member of the Order of Australia (AM), 1992
- Centenary Medal, 2001
