= Talluba (Baradine County parish) =

Talluba Parish
- Coordinates: 30°21′S 148°54′E
- Country: Australia
- State: New South Wales
- LGA: Narrabri Shire

Government
  - State electorate: Barwon, Tamworth
  - Federal division: Parkes

Population
  - Total: 273 (2006 census)
- Postcode: 2388
- County: Baradine County

Talluba Parish(Baradine County) is a civil parish of Baradine County, New South Wales.

The parish is on the Namoi River and the only town of the civil Parish is Pilliga, New South Wales.
