= Elongery, New South Wales =

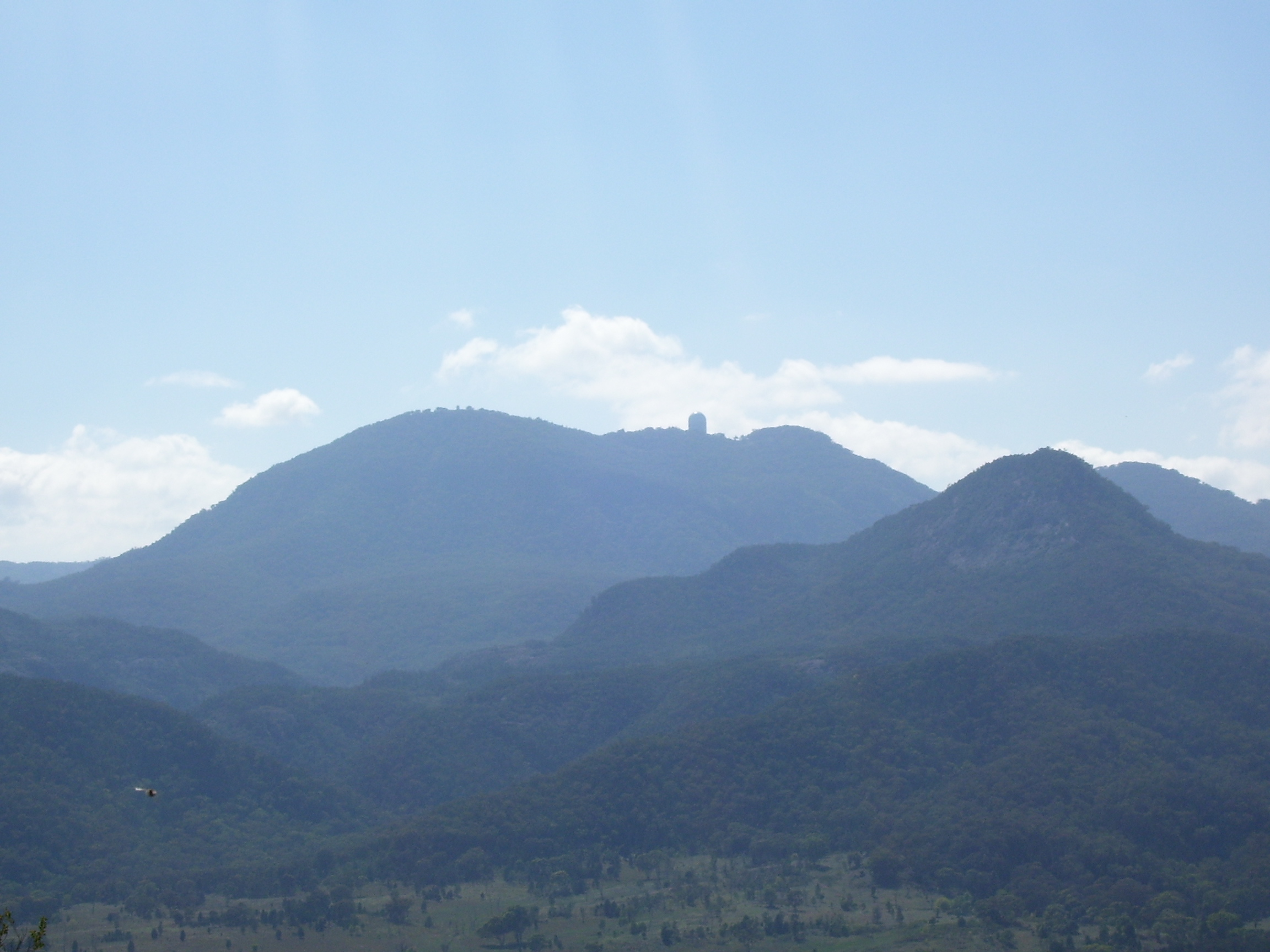
Elongerry Parish

Elongery, New South Wales is a bounded rural locality of Wurrumbungle Shire and a civil parish of Baradine County, New South Wales.

The main features of the parish is Warrumbungle National Park and the Anglo-Australian Telescope complex.
