= Merebene railway station =

Former railway station in New South Wales, Australia

Coordinates: 30°41′30″S 148°59′57″E

Merebene is a location on the now closed Gwabegar railway line in north-western New South Wales, Australia. A halt was located there between 1925 and 1971.

Preceding station	Former services	Following station
Gwabegar Terminus	Gwabegar Line	Kenebri towards Wallerawang
