= Richard Kingsford (ecologist) =

Australian ecologist

Richard Kingsford AO FRSN is an environmental/biological expert and river ecologist. Much of his work has been undertaken with the Murray-Darling Basin wetlands and rivers covering approximately 70 percent of the Australian continent. He is the director of the Centre for Ecosystem Science at the University of New South Wales School of Biological, Earth and Environmental Sciences, a member of the Australian Government’s Environmental Flows Scientific Committee.

Kingsford presented "A Meander Down a River or Two: How Water Defines Our Continent and Its Future" for the second Eric Rolls Memorial Lecture in 2012.

In 2019 the Australian Regional Council (ARC) appointed Kingsford as chief investigator in a team to develop a new international standard for the appraisal and reporting of the status of the most crucial wetlands worldwide.

== Honours and recognition ==
Kingsford has received the following awards:

- 2001: Eureka Award for his research on ecological values of rivers and impact of Australia’s water resource aridity
- 2007: Hoffman medal for his contribution to global wetland science
- 2008: Eureka Award for Promoting Understanding of Science
- 2015: Eureka Award (as a member of the IUCN Red List of Ecosystems team) for Environmental Research resulting in the establishment of a universal standard for assessing ecosystem risks
- 2019: Society for Conservation Biology’s Distinguished Service Award also relating to contributions to freshwater/ecosystem conservation
- 2020: Fellow of the Royal Society of New South Wales
- 2025: Officer of the Order of Australia, for "distinguished service to conservation biology, to environmental sustainability research, and to freshwater biodiversity and ecosystems governance"

== Publications ==
His most cited publication, Kingsford, Richard Tennant. "Ecological impacts of dams, water diversions and river management on floodplain wetlands in Australia." Australian Ecology 25.2 (2000): 109-127.m has been cited 985 times, according to Google Scholar.
