= Meit (Baradine County parish) =

Civil parish in Baradine County, New South Wales

Meit Parish is a civil parish of Baradine County, New South Wales.

Located at 30°25'54.0"S 148°49'04.0"E on the Pillager Road south of Pilliga, New South Wales, the parish is located on the border of the Pilliga Forest.
