= Weetaliba, New South Wales =

Weetaliba New South Wales
- Coordinates: 31°38′38″S 149°35′12″E
- Population: 50 (2016 census)
- Postcode(s): 2395
- Location: 422 km (262 mi) NW of Sydney; 140 km (87 mi) E of Dubbo; 84 km (52 mi) E of Dunedoo, New South Wales
- LGA(s): Warrumbungle Shire
- State electorate(s): Barwon
- Federal division(s): Parkes

Weetaliba is a village in the Warrumbungle Shire of New South Wales, Australia. At the 2016 census, Weetaliba had a population of 50.
