= Meite =

Meite or Meité is a surname. Notable people with the surname include:

- Soualiho Meïté (born 1994), French footballer
- Abdoulaye Méïté (born 1980), French born Ivorian former footballer
- Yakou Méïté (born 1996), French born Ivorian footballer currently playing for Championship side Cardiff City FC
- Amadou Meïté (1949–2014), sprinter from Côte d'Ivoire
- Ben Youssef Meïté (born 1986), sprinter from Côte d'Ivoire
- Ibrahim Meité (born 1976), Côte d'Ivoire sprinter who specializes in the 100 and 200 metres
- Maé Bérénice Méité (born 1994), French figure skater
- Mohamed Kader Meïté (born 2007), French born Ivorian footballer currently playing for Saudi Pro League team Al-Hilal
