= A Million Wild Acres =

1981 non-fiction book about the history of European settlement in Australia

A Million Wild Acres: 200 years of man and an Australian forest
- Author: Eric Charles Rolls
- Language: English
- Genre: Non-fiction
- Publisher: Nelson
- Publication date: 1981
- Publication place: Australia
- Media type: Print
- Pages: 465 pp.
- ISBN: 0170053024

A Million Wild Acres: 200 years of man and an Australian forest is a non-fiction book written by Eric Charles Rolls (1923–2007). It was first published in Melbourne by Thomas Nelson in 1981.

A Million Wild Acres is not just a regional history of what is now known as the Pilliga forest, but also a history of European settlement in Australia.

== Contents ==
1. Explorers and Livestock: Setting up the Board
2. The First Moves: A Difficult Game
3. The Squatters: The Rules are Ignored
4. Licences to Depasture Beyond the Limits: A New Game to New Rules
5. Runholders and Selectors: The Rules are Modified
6. The Forest Takes Over: The Game Ends
7. The Breelong Blacks: A Sinister Comedy
8. Timber and Scrub
9. Timbergetters and Scrub Dwellers: A Different Game
10. Mud Springs and Soda Plains
11. Animal Life: Insects, Reptiles and Others
12. Animal Life: The Mammals
13. The Animals: The Birds
14. Wood Chips and International Airports: A Businessmen's Game

== Reception ==
The book won The Age Book of the Year (1981), and Talking Book of the Year.

This will be seen as one of the great books about Australia. Eric Rolls gives the history of the forest the laconic power of an extended campfire yarn, spiced with the personal vision that comes from a lifetime of acute observation

— Historian, Professor Weston Bate

== Notes ==
- https://www.abc.net.au/radionational/programs/the-history-listen/eric-rolls-and-the-pilliga/10594212
- Watermark Literary Society
- Wyndham, Susan (2 November 2007). "Author Rolls dies aged 84". Sydney Morning Herald.
- Hanley, Penelope. Creative lives: personal papers of Australian writers and artists.
- Mosman Readers: Eric Rolls - A Million Wild Acres. 26/01/2009
- Rolls later qualified this book's debated overall position on Australian tree densities and land clearing.

=== References ===
- Rothwell, Nicholas; Barclay, Paul; Coombe, Ian (6 November 2014). "What lies beyond us? The literature of landscape". ABC.
