= Pilliga forest =

Woodland in New South Wales, Australia

Coordinates: 30°45′35″S 149°17′48″E

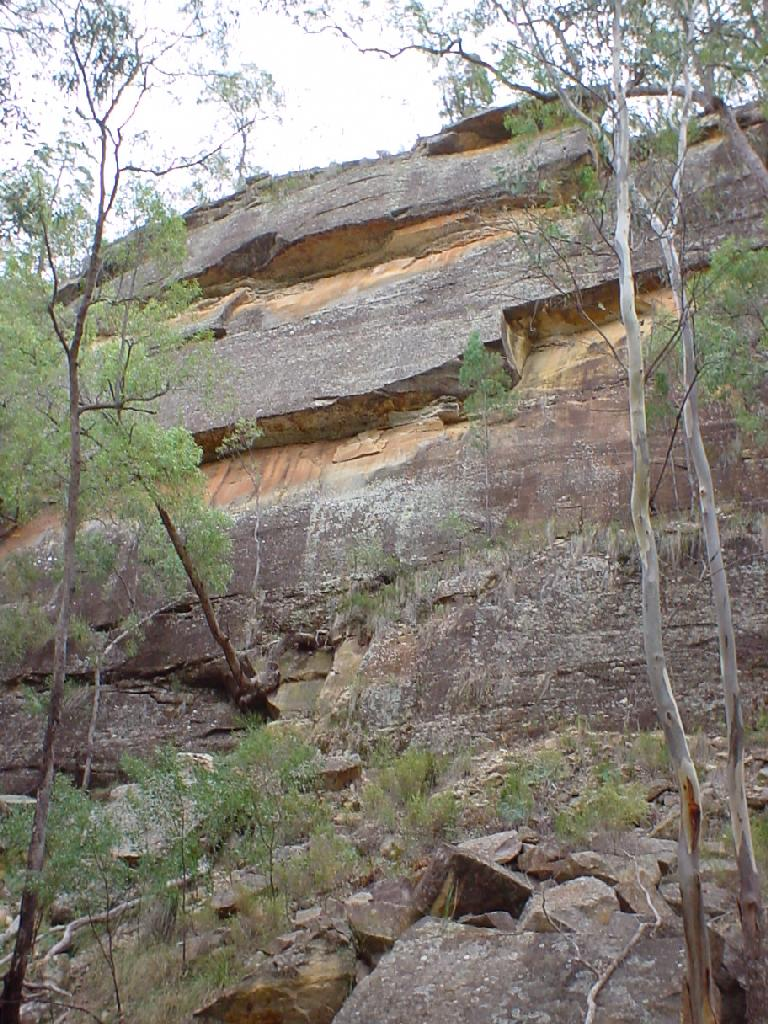
Dandry Creek Gorge in the south of the Pilliga

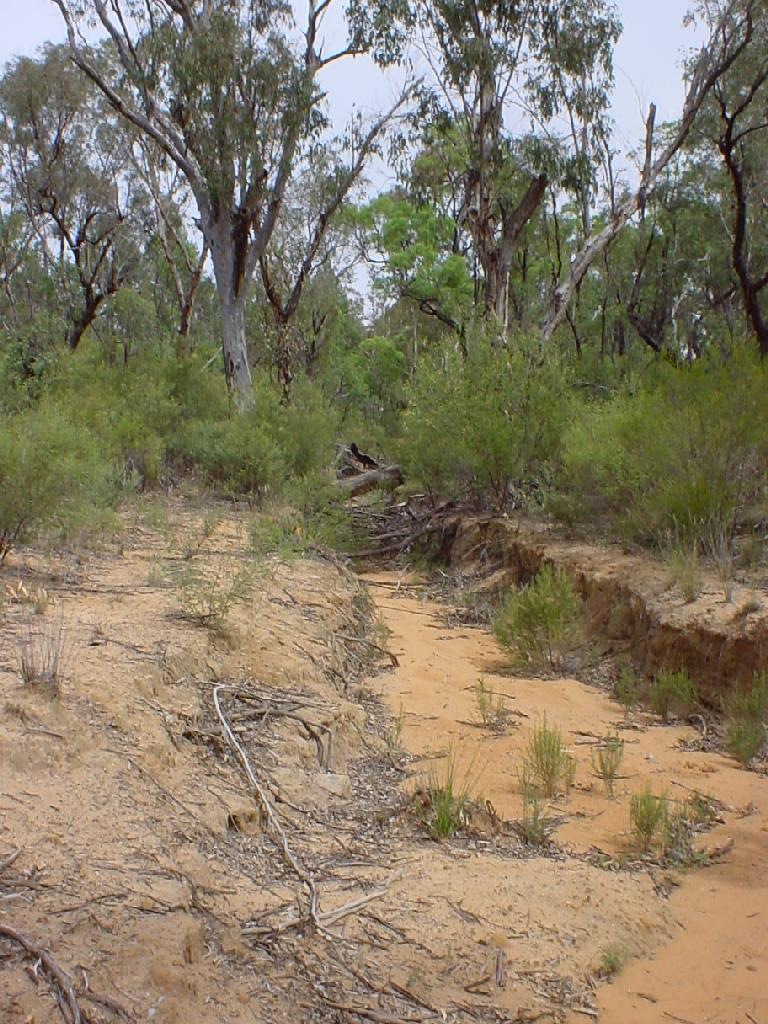
Typical sandy creek in the Pilliga

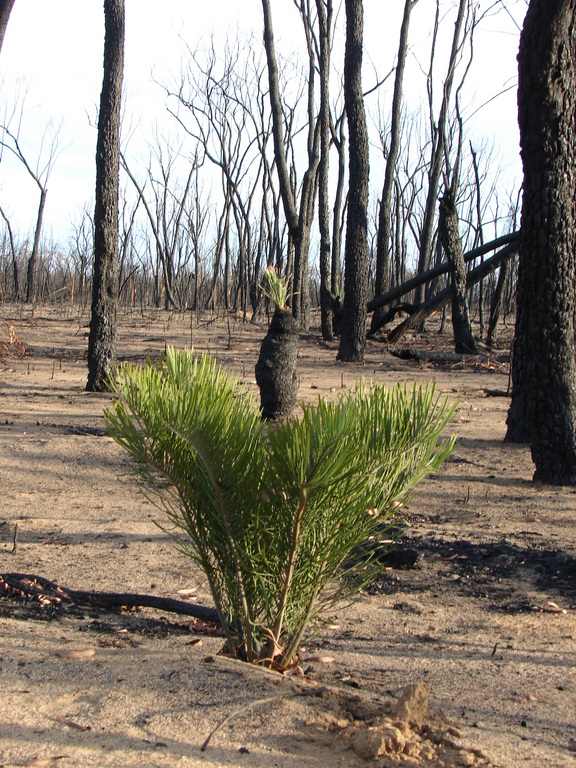
Many plants are adapted to fire

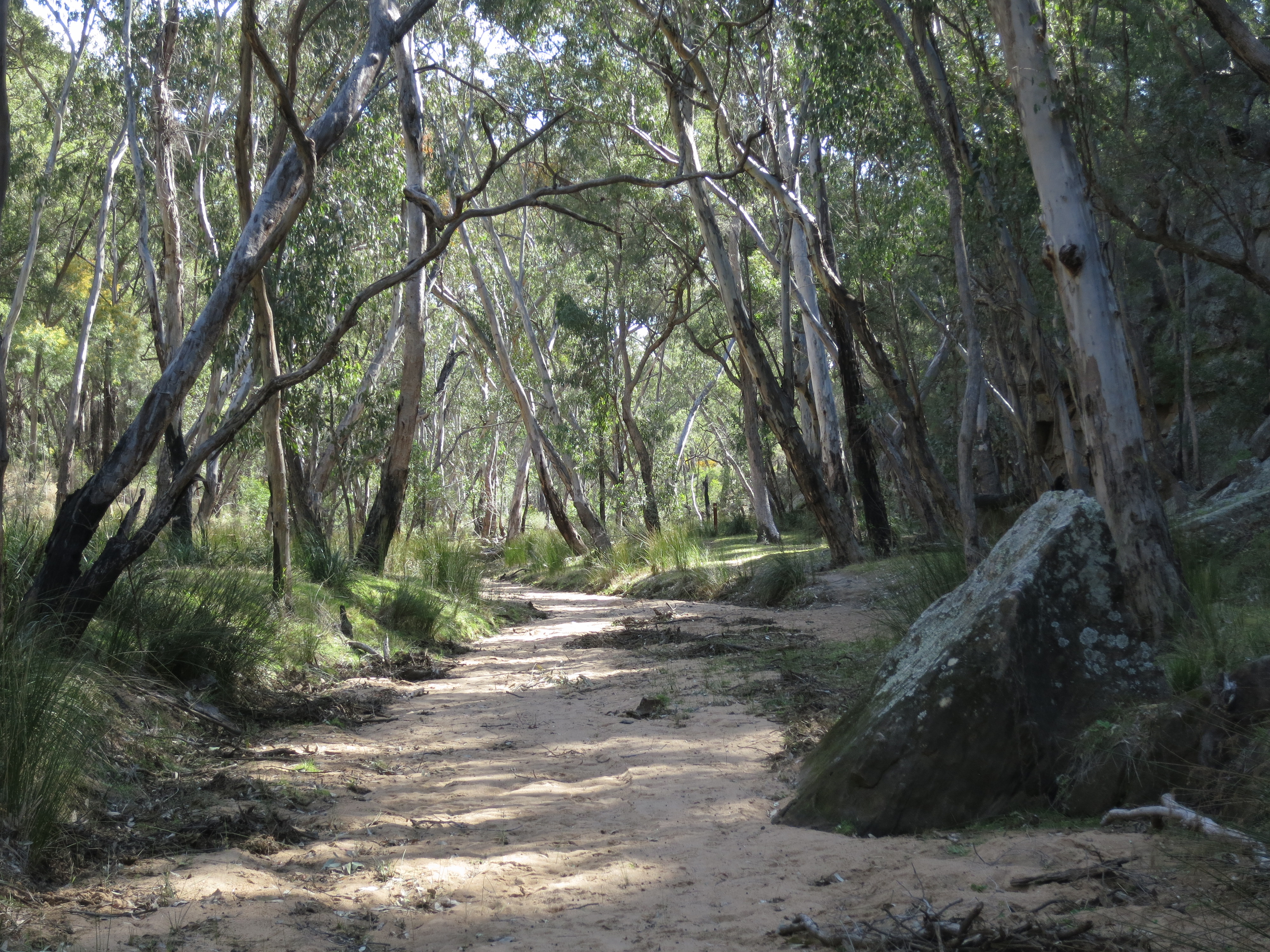
Creek in Dandry Gorge

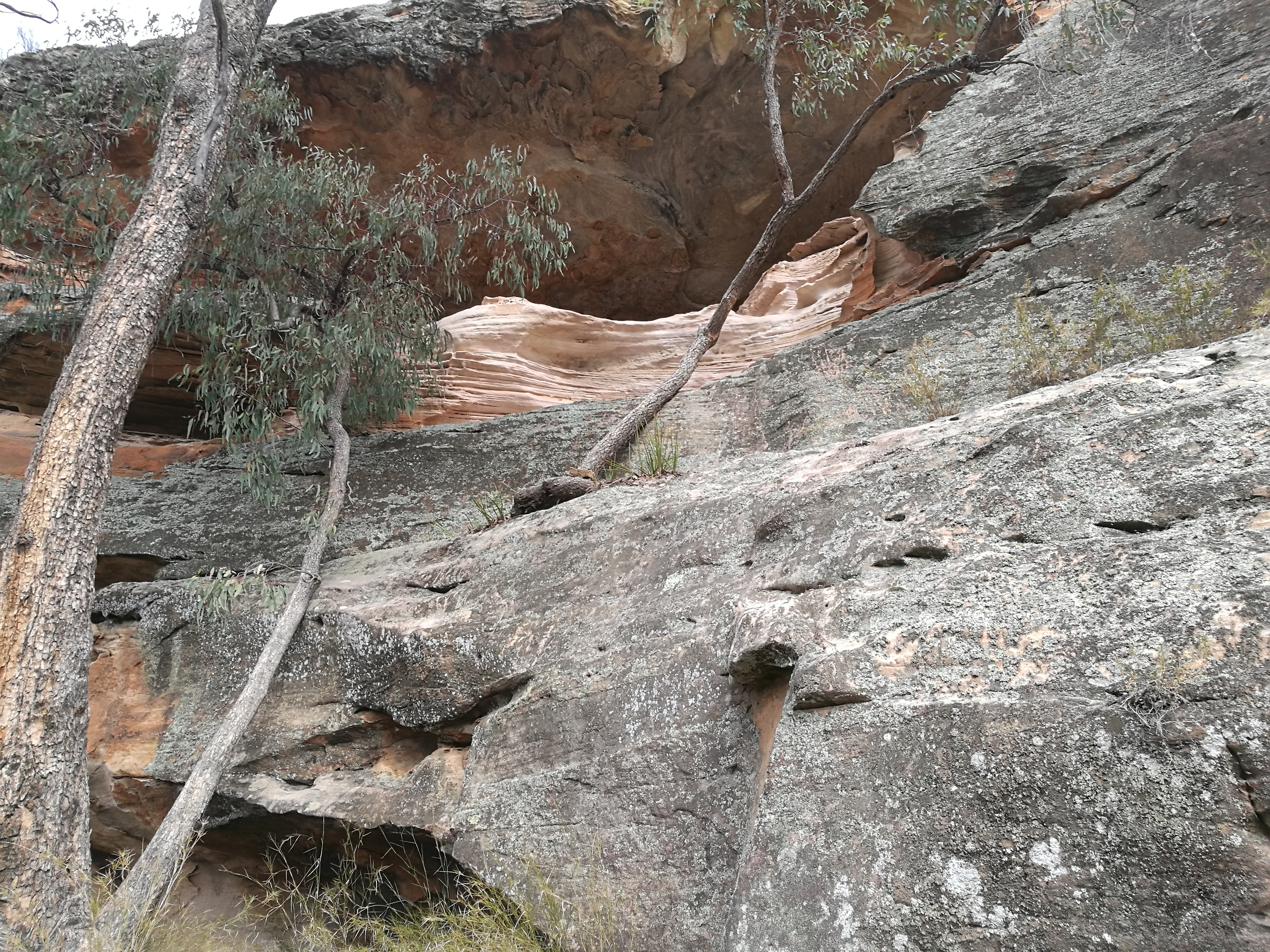
The Sandstone Caves, Pilliga Nature Reserve

The Pilliga Forest, sometimes known as the Pilliga Scrub, constitutes over 5,000 km^{2} of semi-arid woodland in temperate north-central New South Wales, Australia. It is the largest such continuous remnant in the state. The forest is located near the towns of Baradine and Narrabri and the villages of Pilliga and Gwabegar.

Most land within the Pilliga is in crown tenure, either as State Forest (2,416 km^{2}), Nature Reserve, State Conservation Area or National Park (2,770 km^{2}).

== History ==
Author Eric Rolls wrote a historic account of the Pilliga called A Million Wild Acres, which gives an insight into the history of the region. One of Rolls' most-cited conclusions is that the forest used to be an open woodland forest and that European influence has enabled the cypress pine to dominate. However, many scientific authors now disagree with much of Rolls' analysis, quoting historical records from as early as the 1870s which suggest that the plant communities in the scrub have not undergone the level of alteration that Rolls suggests. However most of his history of the region is uncontested and his book remains an invaluable document for understanding the region.

== Environment ==
=== Geology ===
The geology of the area is dominated by Pilliga sandstone, a coarse red to yellow Jurassic sandstone containing about 75% quartz, 15% plagioclase and 10% iron oxide, although local variations in soil type do occur. Sandstone outcrops with basalt-capped ridges are common in the south, while the Pilliga outwash areas in the north and west are dominated by alluvium from flooding creeks. Gilgais occur in some areas. In the west "sand monkeys" (abandoned creek beds) are common. In the east is a heavily eroded sandstone mountain range, visible in outcrops such as those around Gin's Leap between Baan Baa and Boggabri.

=== Flora and fauna ===
The forest contains at least 900 plant species, including some now widely grown in cultivation, as well as many threatened species. Some areas of the forest, particularly in the western Pilliga, are dominated by cypress-pine (Callitris spp.). However, there are a variety of distinct plant communities in the forest, some of which do not include Callitris, such as mallee and heathland. Another prominent sub-canopy genus are the she-oaks, while eucalypts dominate the canopy throughout the forest.

Fauna recorded from the Pilliga Nature Reserve include at least 40 native and nine introduced mammals, 50 reptiles and at least 15 frogs. Squirrel gliders, koalas, rufous bettongs and Pilliga mice are present.

A 4,909 km^{2} tract of land, including the forest and the nearby Warrumbungle National Park, has been identified by BirdLife International as an Important Bird Area (IBA) because it supports populations of painted honeyeaters and diamond firetails. It also experiences irregular occurrences of endangered swift parrots and regent honeyeaters, and near threatened bush stone-curlews. Other declining woodland birds present in good numbers include barking owls, glossy black-cockatoos, grey-crowned babblers, speckled warblers, brown treecreepers, hooded robins and turquoise parrots.

=== Fires ===
Fire plays a major role in the ecology of the forest with many plant species depending on fire to regenerate. However, in unfavorable conditions fire can be extremely intense, spread very quickly and threaten nearby properties as well as laying waste to entire ecosystems. If intense fires occur less than 15 years apart there can be a loss of plant and animal biodiversity. The magnitude of historical Pilliga bushfires correlates extremely well with the El Niño Southern Oscillation phenomena, with El Niño (dry) years having the most severe fires.

In 1997 a major fire burned close to 1,435 km^{2} of the forest. An extremely dry winter and spring in 2006 saw a number of large fires develop, including the Pilliga 4 Fire in November/December which burned out 740 km^{2} on just its first day.

== Access and attractions ==
Towns in the area include Narrabri, Pilliga, Gwabegar, Baradine, Coonabarabran, Boggabri and Baan Baa. There is an extensive network of roads throughout the scrub, many of which are former forestry roads. The forest once supported a large forestry industry in the surrounding towns (harvesting mostly cypress pine and ironbarks) however this has been greatly scaled back since 2005 when much of the forest was set aside for environmental conservation by the NSW government.

There are many attractions in the forest, including:

- Sculptures in the Scrub: A series of Sculptures along the Dandry Gorge
- Salt caves: shallow sandstone caves in the middle of the Pilliga. There is also a public fire tower located at Salt Caves.
- Sandstone Caves Walking Track: Pilliga Nature Reserve
- Dandry Creek Gorge: sandstone cliff toward the south of the Pilliga
- Pilliga Pottery: off the highway north of Coonabarabran
- Bird-watching: many species of birds occur in the forest; the Baradine Visitor's Centre has information leaflets

== Gallery ==
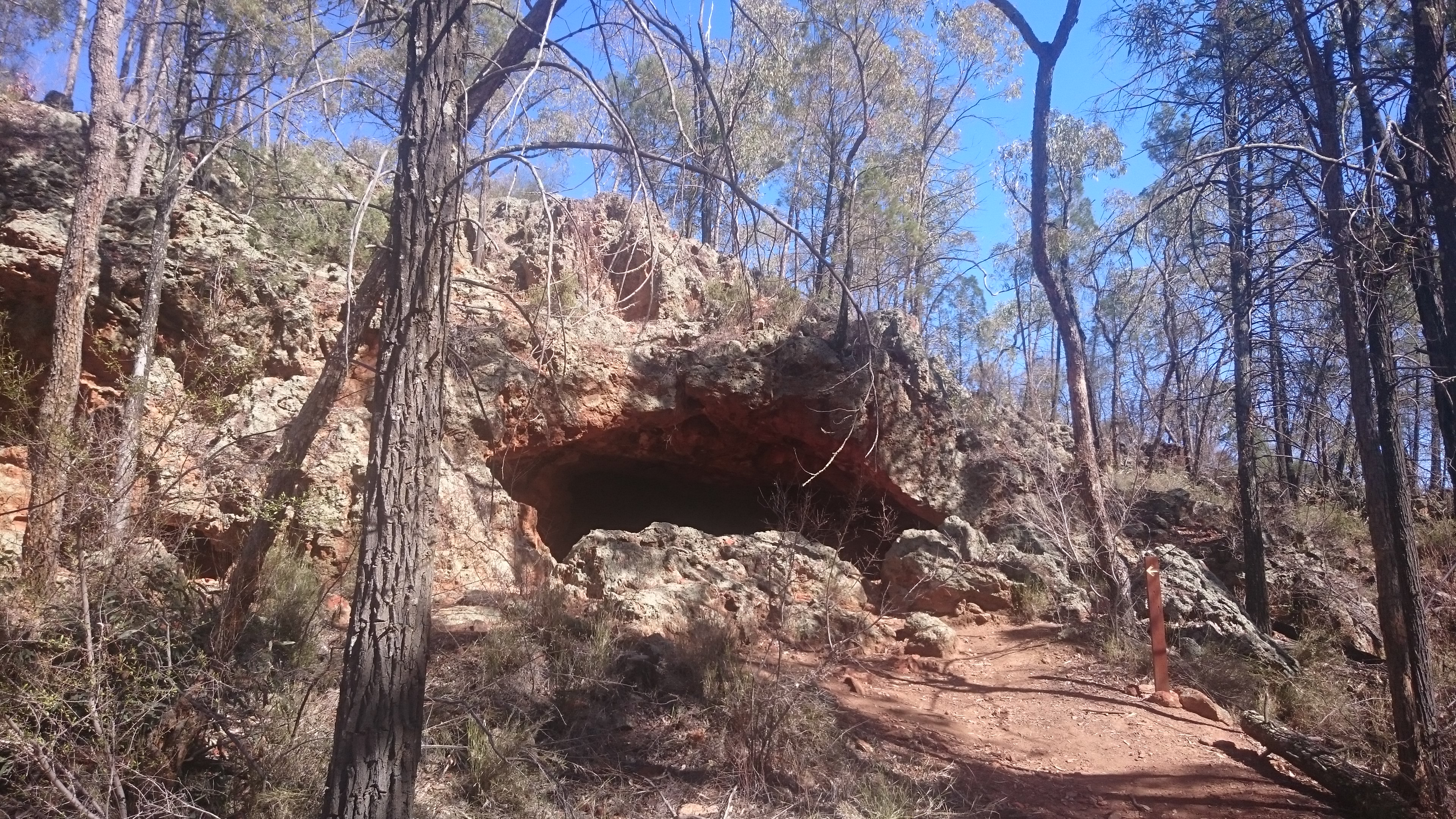
Salt cave

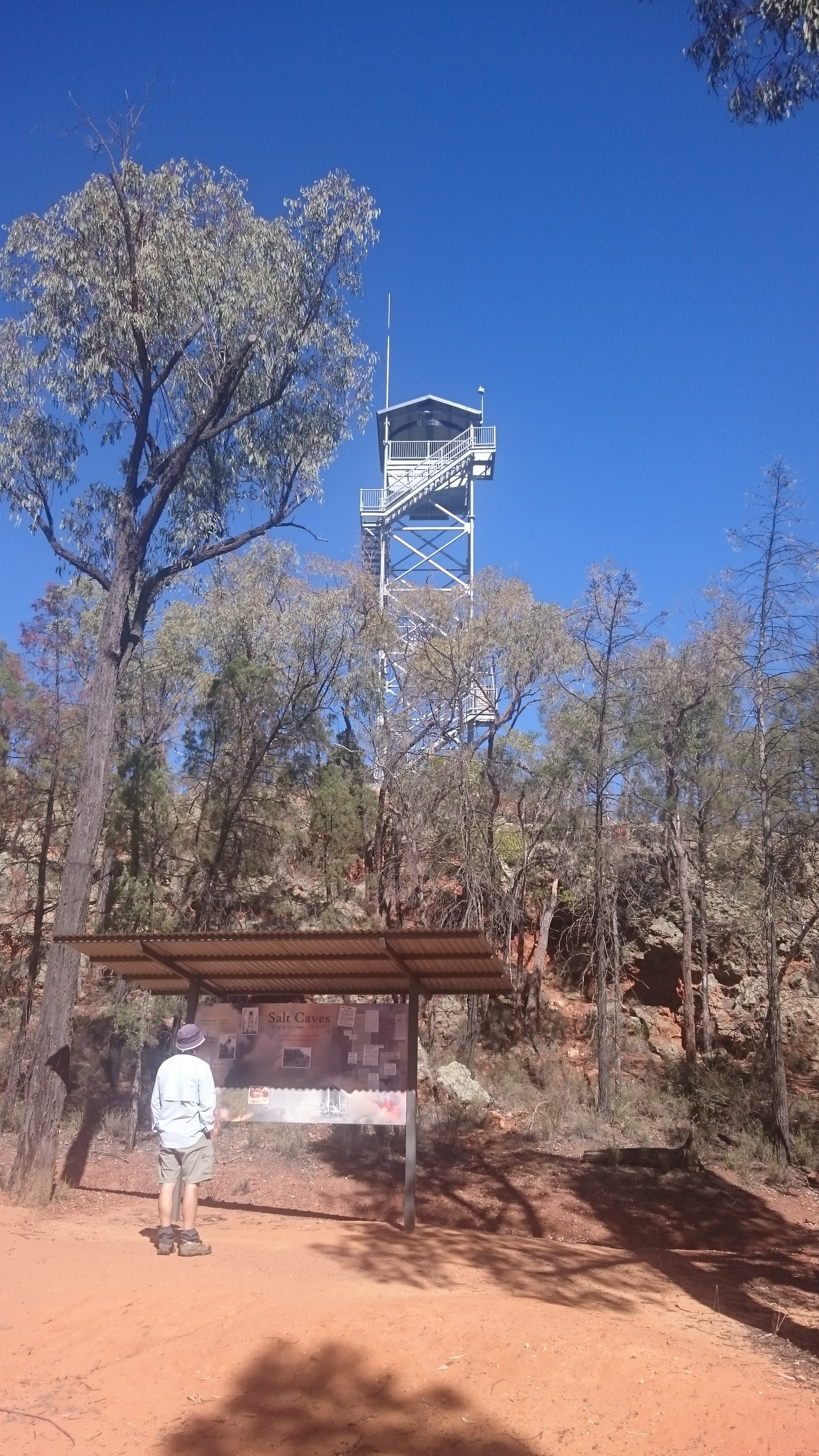
Fire tower

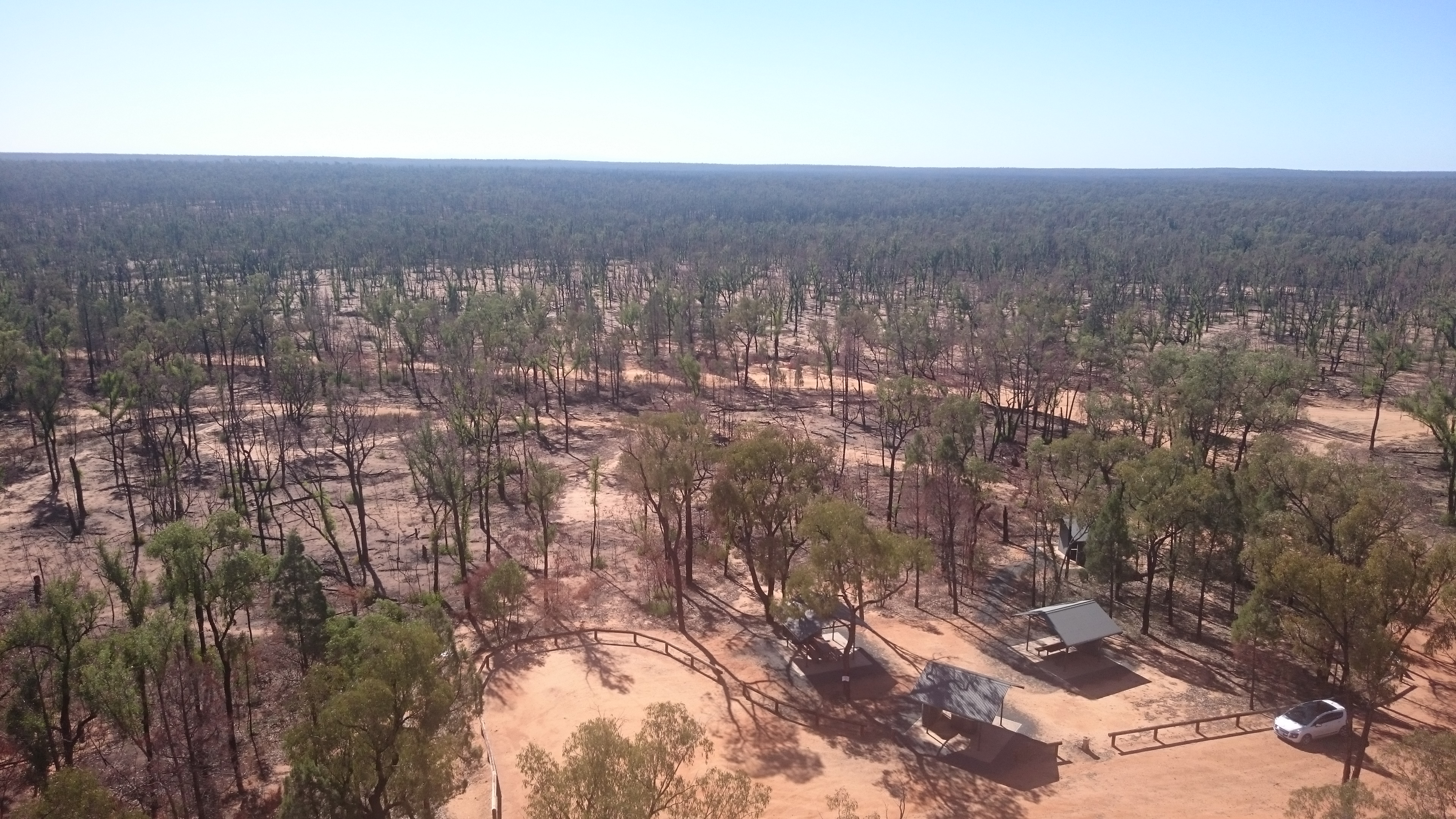
View from the fire tower

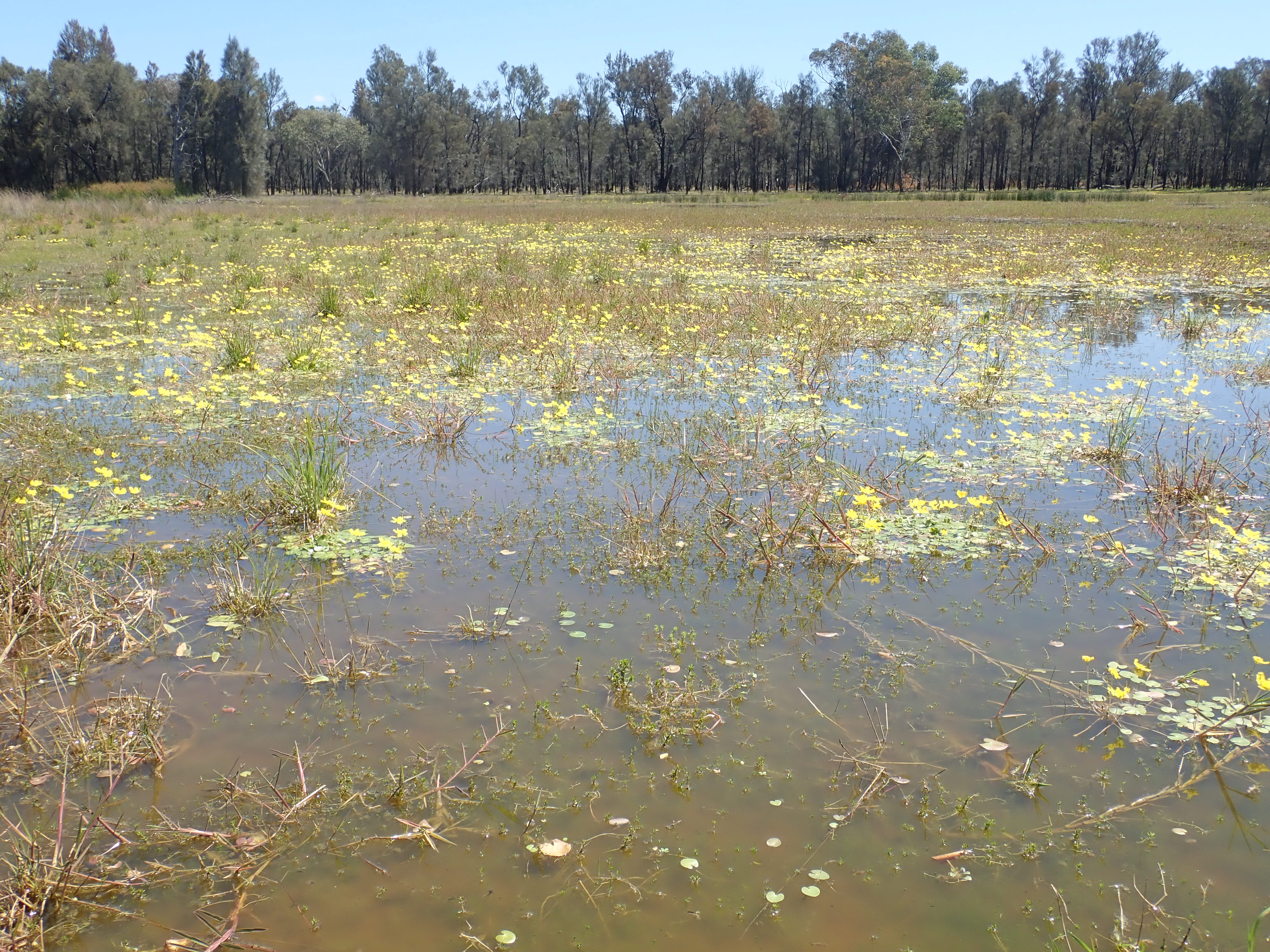
Intermittent wetland in Pilliga National Park

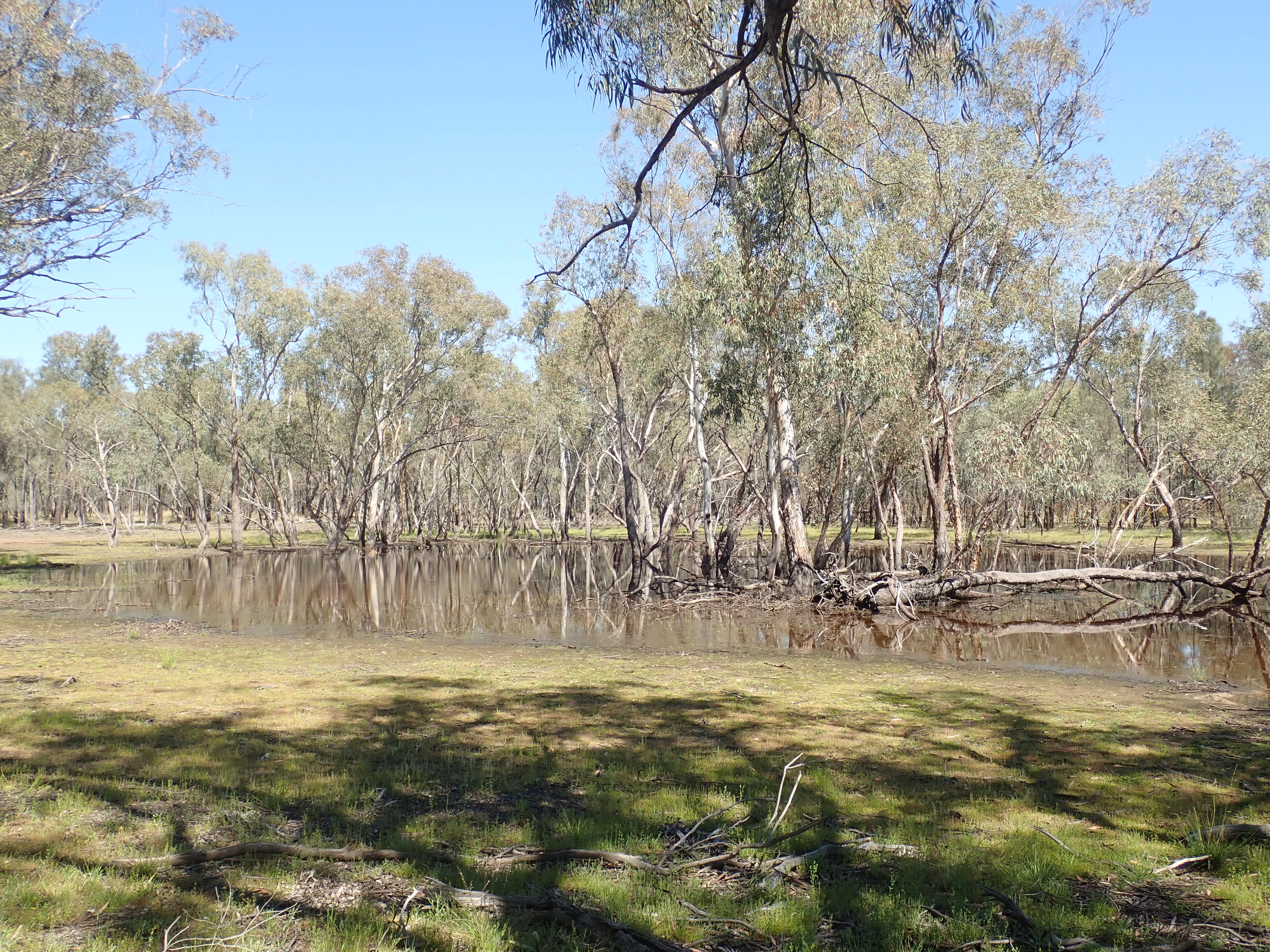
Intermittent wetland in Pilliga National Park

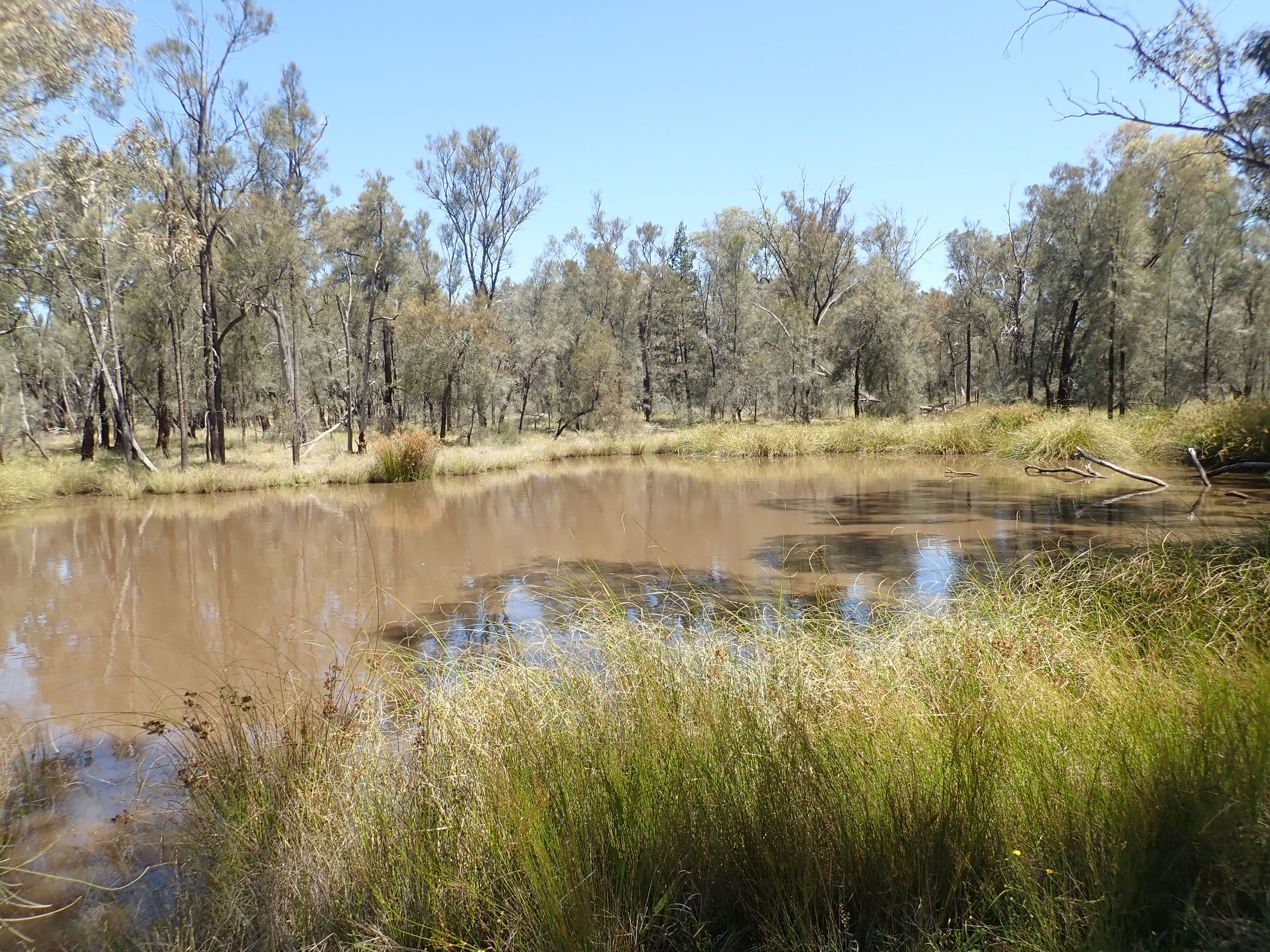
Intermittent wetland in Pilliga National Park

== See also ==
- Forests of Australia
