= Gwabegar =

Gwabegar New South Wales
- Coordinates: 30°37′S 148°59′E
- Population: 344 (2011 census)
- Postcode(s): 2356
- Location: 625 km (388 mi) NW of Sydney; 238 km (148 mi) N of Dubbo; 108 km (67 mi) SW of Narrabri; 75 km (47 mi) NE of Coonamble
- LGA(s): Narrabri Shire
- State electorate(s): Barwon
- Federal division(s): Parkes

Gwabegar (/ˈwɒbɪɡər/) is a town in North Eastern New South Wales, Australia. The town is in the Narrabri Shire local government area, 625 kilometres (388 mi) north west of the state capital, Sydney. At the 2011 census, Gwabegar had a population of 344.

The town is in the middle of the largest naturally forming cypress pine (Callitris) forest in the Southern Hemisphere, the Pilliga forest. The timber industry was once the mainstay of the town with twelve sawmills operating, but they have been closed, leaving farming as the main source of income.

Goonanyah Post Office opened on 15 August 1912 and was renamed Gwabegar in 1924.

Gwabegar is the historical terminus of the Gwabegar railway line, which is now truncated to Binnaway. The now closed railway station opened in 1923.

Preceding station	Former services	Following station
Terminus	Gwabegar Line	Merebene towards Wallerawang
