= Gowen County =

Gowen
- Cadastral division
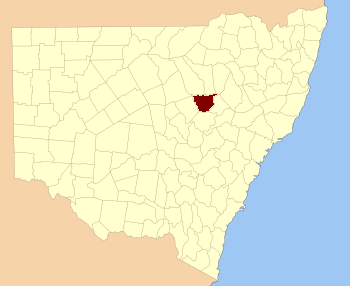
- Location in New South Wales
- Country: Australia
- State: New South Wales
Lands administrative divisions around Gowen
Leichhardt	Baradine	White
Ewenmar	Gowen	Napier
Ewenmar	Lincoln	Napier

Gowen County is one of the 141 cadastral divisions of New South Wales. It is located to the east of the Castlereagh River in the area to the east of Gilgandra, to Coonabarabran in the north-east. This includes land on both sides of the Newell Highway.

The origin of the name Gowen County is unknown.

== Parishes within this county ==
A full list of parishes found within this county; their current LGA and mapping coordinates to the approximate centre of each location is as follows:

Parish	LGA	Coordinates
Baby	Warrumbungle Shire	31°17′54″S 149°30′04″E
Balumbridal	Warrumbungle Shire	31°20′54″S 149°09′04″E
Bandulla	Warrumbungle Shire	31°43′54″S 149°08′04″E
Bearbong	Gilgandra Shire	31°38′54″S 148°57′04″E
Belar	Warrumbungle Shire	31°29′54″S 149°15′04″E
Biralbung	Gilgandra Shire	31°38′54″S 148°48′04″E
Bone Bone	Warrumbungle Shire	31°35′54″S 149°10′04″E
Boyben	Gilgandra Shire	31°46′54″S 148°52′04″E
Breelong	Gilgandra Shire	31°44′54″S 148°48′04″E
Burrendah	Gilgandra Shire	31°42′54″S 148°55′04″E
Caigan	Warrumbungle Shire	31°41′54″S 149°14′04″E
Callangoan	Gilgandra Shire	31°29′54″S 148°36′04″E
Caraghnan	Coonamble Shire	31°17′54″S 149°01′04″E
Cobbinbil	Coonamble Shire	31°18′54″S 148°39′04″E
Coonabarabran	Warrumbungle Shire	31°15′54″S 149°16′04″E
Cuttabulloo	Warrumbungle Shire	31°38′54″S 149°18′04″E
Deringulla	Warrumbungle Shire	31°20′54″S 149°14′04″E
Dilly	Gilgandra Shire	31°31′54″S 148°54′04″E
Eringanerin	Gilgandra Shire	31°41′54″S 148°42′04″E
Gowang	Warrumbungle Shire	31°22′54″S 149°01′04″E
Greenbah	Warrumbungle Shire	31°33′54″S 149°19′04″E
Gulargambone	Coonamble Shire	31°23′54″S 148°14′04″E
Gumin	Coonamble Shire	31°17′54″S 148°53′04″E
Gundi	Warrumbungle Shire	31°17′54″S 149°11′04″E
Kirban	Gilgandra Shire	31°31′54″S 149°04′04″E
Mundar	Gilgandra Shire	31°31′54″S 148°48′04″E
Naman	Coonamble Shire	31°20′54″S 149°00′04″E
Nandi	Warrumbungle Shire	31°14′54″S 149°13′04″E
Orandelbinia	Warrumbungle Shire	31°32′54″S 149°11′04″E
Piangula	Gilgandra Shire	31°38′54″S 149°02′04″E
Pibbon	Gilgandra Shire	31°34′54″S 149°04′04″E
Quandong	Coonamble Shire	31°18′54″S 148°46′04″E
Tannabar	Warrumbungle Shire	31°23′54″S 149°09′04″E
Tarambijal	Coonamble Shire	31°21′54″S 148°44′04″E
Terrabile	Gilgandra Shire	31°31′54″S 148°42′04″E
Timor	Warrumbungle Shire	31°16′54″S 149°07′04″E
Tonderburine	Coonamble Shire	31°21′54″S 148°52′04″E
Tooraweenah	Gilgandra Shire	31°27′54″S 148°54′04″E
Uargon	Gilgandra Shire	31°29′54″S 149°00′04″E
Ulamambri	Warrumbungle Shire	31°14′54″S 149°30′04″E
Ulungra	Gilgandra Shire	31°43′54″S 149°02′04″E
Urabrible	Warrumbungle Shire	31°19′54″S 149°17′04″E
Wallumburrawang	Gilgandra Shire	31°33′54″S 149°00′04″E
Wilber	Coonamble Shire	31°17′54″S 148°33′04″E
Windurong	Gilgandra Shire	31°27′54″S 148°40′04″E
Wingabutta	Warrumbungle Shire	31°29′54″S 149°11′04″E
Woorut	Warrumbungle Shire	31°18′54″S 149°04′04″E
Yalcogrin	Gilgandra Shire	31°37′54″S 148°41′04″E
Yarragrin	Warrumbungle Shire	31°40′54″S 149°08′04″E
Yarrawin	Warrumbungle Shire	31°24′54″S 149°15′04″E
Youlbung	Gilgandra Shire	31°27′54″S 148°51′04″E
