= Bearbong, New South Wales =

Bearbong
- Coordinates: 31°26′20″S 148°54′40″E
- Country: Australia
- State: New South Wales
- LGA: Gilgandra Shire
- Location: 486 km (302 mi) NW of Sydney; 108 km (67 mi) N of Dubbo; 43 km (27 mi) NE of Gilgandra

Government
  - State electorate: Barwon
  - Federal division: Parkes

Population
  - Total: 72 (SAL 2021)
- Postcode: 2817

Bearbong, New South Wales is a bounded rural locality of Gilgandra Shire and a civil parish of Gowen County, a county of New South Wales.

The parish is also known as Bearbung.

The Parish is on the Wallumburrawang Creek a tributary of the Castlereagh River, and the nearest settlement of the parish is Tooraweenah, New South Wales to the north.

The parish is on the traditional lands of the Weilwan.
