= Cobbinbil, New South Wales =

Cobbinbil
- Coordinates: 31°20′S 148°28′E
- Country: Australia
- State: New South Wales
- LGA: Coonamble Shire Council
- Location: 382 km (237 mi) NW of Sydney; 102 km (63 mi) N of Dubbo; 43 km (27 mi) S of Coonamble

Government
  - State electorate: Barwon
  - Federal division: Parkes
- Postcode: 2828
- County: Gowen

Cobbinbil Parish, New South Wales is a bounded rural locality and a civil parish of Gowen County, New South Wales.

The parish is on Cobbinbil, Baronesse and Gulargambone Creeks west of Gulargambone.

The parish is on the traditional lands of the Weilwan Aboriginal people.
