= Callangoan, New South Wales =

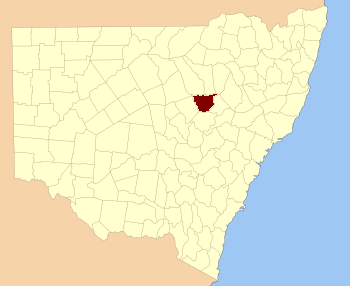
Gowen NSW.

Callangoan, New South Wales is a bounded rural locality of Coonamble Shire, and a civil parish of Gowen County, a county of New South Wales.

The parish is on the Castlereagh River midway between Gulargambone and Gilgandra.

The main feature of the economy of Callangoan is agriculture.

The parish is on the traditional lands of the Weilwan Aboriginal people.
