= Youlbung, New South Wales =

Youlbung
- Coordinates: 31°26′20″S 148°54′40″E
- Country: Australia
- State: New South Wales
- LGA: Gilgandra Shire
- Location: 486 km (302 mi) NW of Sydney; 108 km (67 mi) N of Dubbo; 43 km (27 mi) NE of Gilgandra

Government
  - State electorate: Barwon
  - Federal division: Parkes
- Postcode: 2817

Youlbung, New South Wales is a bounded rural locality of Gilgandra Shire and a civil parish of Gowen County, a cadastral division of New South Wales.

The parish is on the Terrebilie Creek and the nearest settlement of the parish is Tooraweenah, New South Wales to the south. The parish is on the traditional lands of the Weilwan Aboriginal people.
