= Kirban =

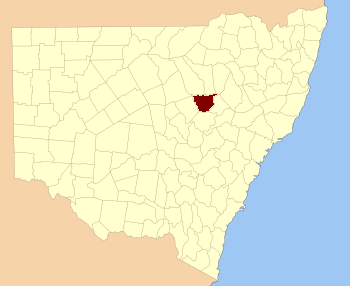
- Gowen NSW
- Interactive map of Kirban

Kirban is a bounded rural locality of Gilgandra Shire and a civil parish of Gowen County, New South Wales.

== Location ==
The Parish is on the Wallumburrawang Creek a tributary of the Castlereagh River, and the nearest settlement of the parish is Tooraweenah, New South Wales to the west.

== History ==
The parish is on the traditional lands of the Weilwan Aboriginal people. The parish was named for The Kirban run established in the 19th century.
