= Dilly, New South Wales =

Dilly Parish
- Coordinates: 31°26′20″S 148°54′40″E
- Country: Australia
- State: New South Wales
- LGA: Gilgandra Shire
- Location: 486 km (302 mi) NW of Sydney; 108 km (67 mi) N of Dubbo; 43 km (27 mi) NE of Gilgandra

Government
  - State electorate: Barwon
  - Federal division: Parkes
- Postcode: 2817

Dilly Parish, New South Wales is a bounded rural locality of Gilgandra Shire and a civil parish of Gowen County, a cadastral division of New South Wales.

The Parish is on the Wallumburrawang Creek a tributary of the Castlereagh River, and the nearest settlement of the parish is Tooraweenah, New South Wales to the north.

The parish is on the traditional lands of the Weilwan Aboriginal people.
