= Naman, New South Wales =

Civil parish in New South Wales, Australia

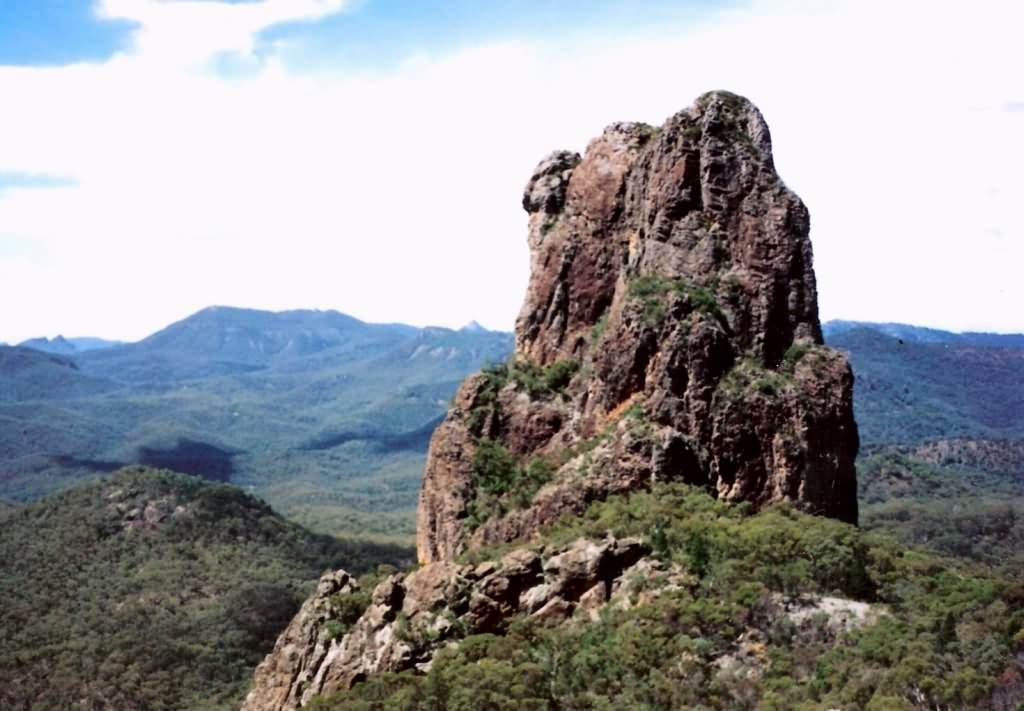
- Crater Bluff, Naman Parish

- Coordinates: 31°26′20″S 148°54′40″E
- Country: Australia
- State: New South Wales
- LGA: Cooonamble Shire
- Location: 486 km (302 mi) NW of Sydney; 108 km (67 mi) N of Dubbo; 43 km (27 mi) NE of Gilgandra

Government
  - State electorate: Barwon
  - Federal division: Parkes
- Postcode: 2817

Naman, New South Wales is a bounded rural locality of Coonamble Shire and a civil parish of Gowen County, New South Wales.

The Parish is on the Tunderbrine Creek a tributary of the Castlereagh River and the nearest settlement of the parish is Tooraweenah, New South Wales to the south.

The parish is on the traditional lands of the Weilwan Aboriginal people.
