= Uargon, New South Wales =

Uargon
- Coordinates: 31°26′20″S 148°54′40″E
- Country: Australia
- State: New South Wales
- LGA: Gilgandra Shire
- Location: 486 km (302 mi) NW of Sydney; 108 km (67 mi) N of Dubbo; 43 km (27 mi) NE of Gilgandra

Government
  - State electorate: Barwon
  - Federal division: Parkes
- Postcode: 2817

Uargon, New South Wales is a bounded rural locality of Gilgandra Shire and a civil parish of Gowen County, New South Wales.

The Parish is on the Uargon Creek and the nearest settlement of the parish is Tooraweenah, New South Wales to the south.
