= Woorut, New South Wales =

Woorut, New South Wales is a bounded rural locality of Warrumbungle Shire and a civil parish of Gowen County, New South Wales.

The parish is on the Castlereagh River.

The northern part of the Parish in Warrumbungle National Park. Woorut Parish is near the Siding Spring Observatory.

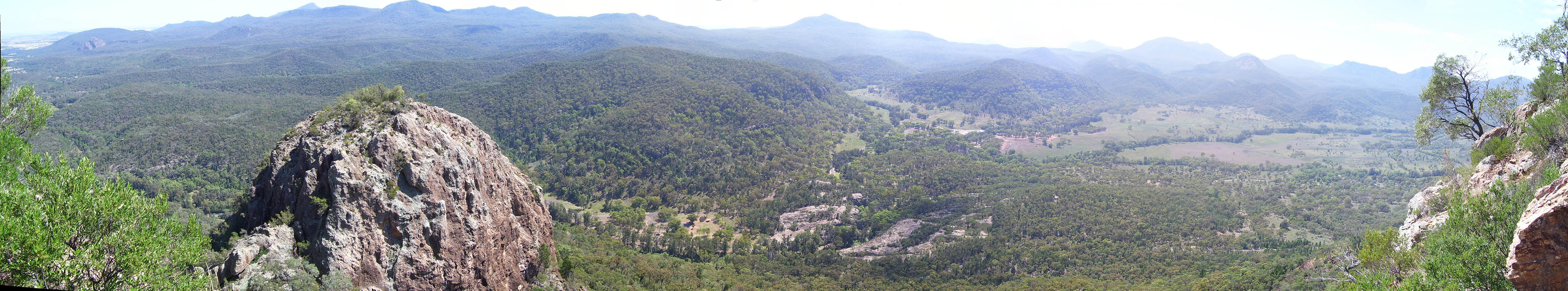
Warrumbungles view from Split Rock

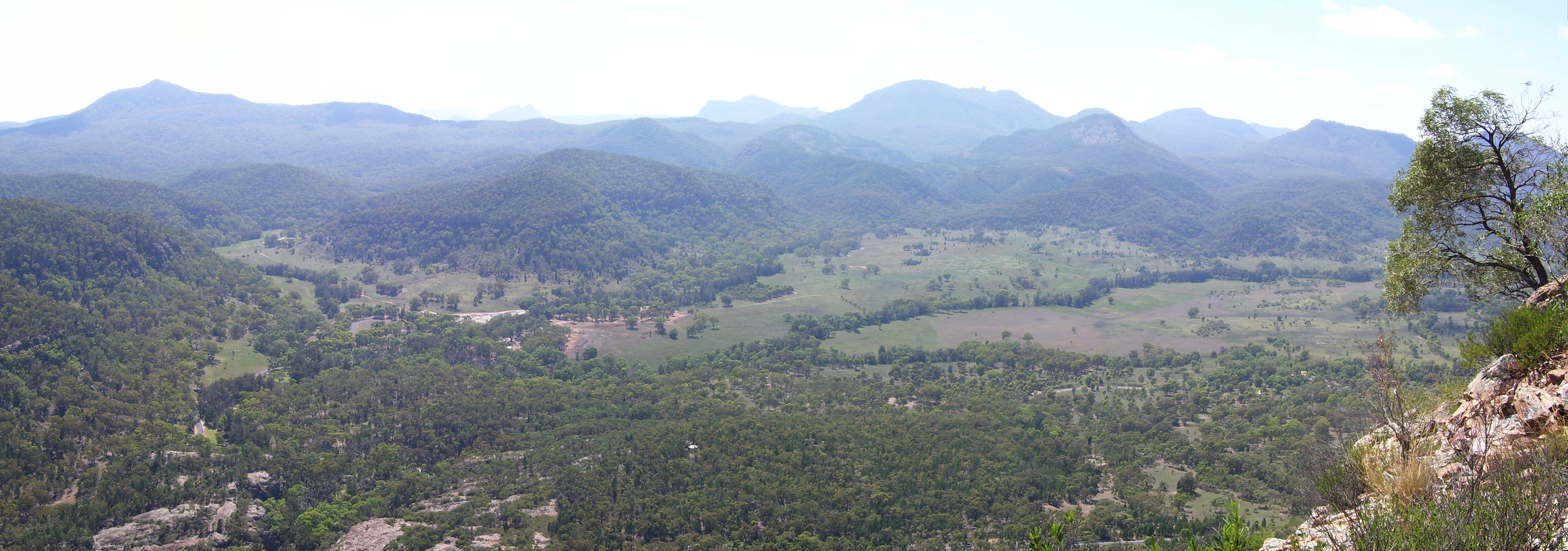
Warrumbungles view from Split Rock

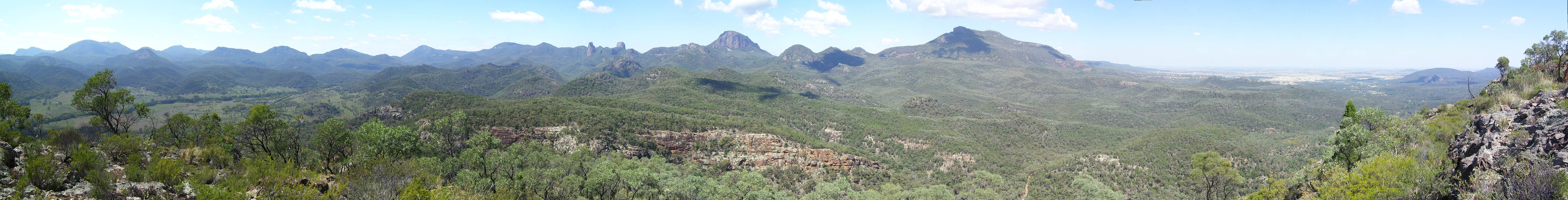
Warrumbungles view from Split Rock
