= Wilber, New South Wales =

Wilber Prish
- Coordinates: 31°20′S 148°28′E
- Country: Australia
- State: New South Wales
- LGA: Coonamble Shire Council
- Location: 382 km (237 mi) NW of Sydney; 102 km (63 mi) N of Dubbo; 43 km (27 mi) S of Coonamble

Government
  - State electorate: Barwon
  - Federal division: Parkes
- Postcode: 2828
- County: Gowen

Wilber Parish, New South Wales is a bounded rural locality of Coonamble Shire and a civil parish of Gowen County, New South Wales.

The only town of the parish is Gulargambone.

The Parish is on the banks of the Castlereagh River and the main settlement of the parish is Gulargambone, New South Wales.
