= Caraghnan, New South Wales =

Caraghnan Parish, New South Wales is a bounded rural locality in Coonamble Shire and a civil parish of Gowen County, New South Wales.

The parish located at 31°17′54″S 149°01′04″ is in the Warrumbungle National Park.

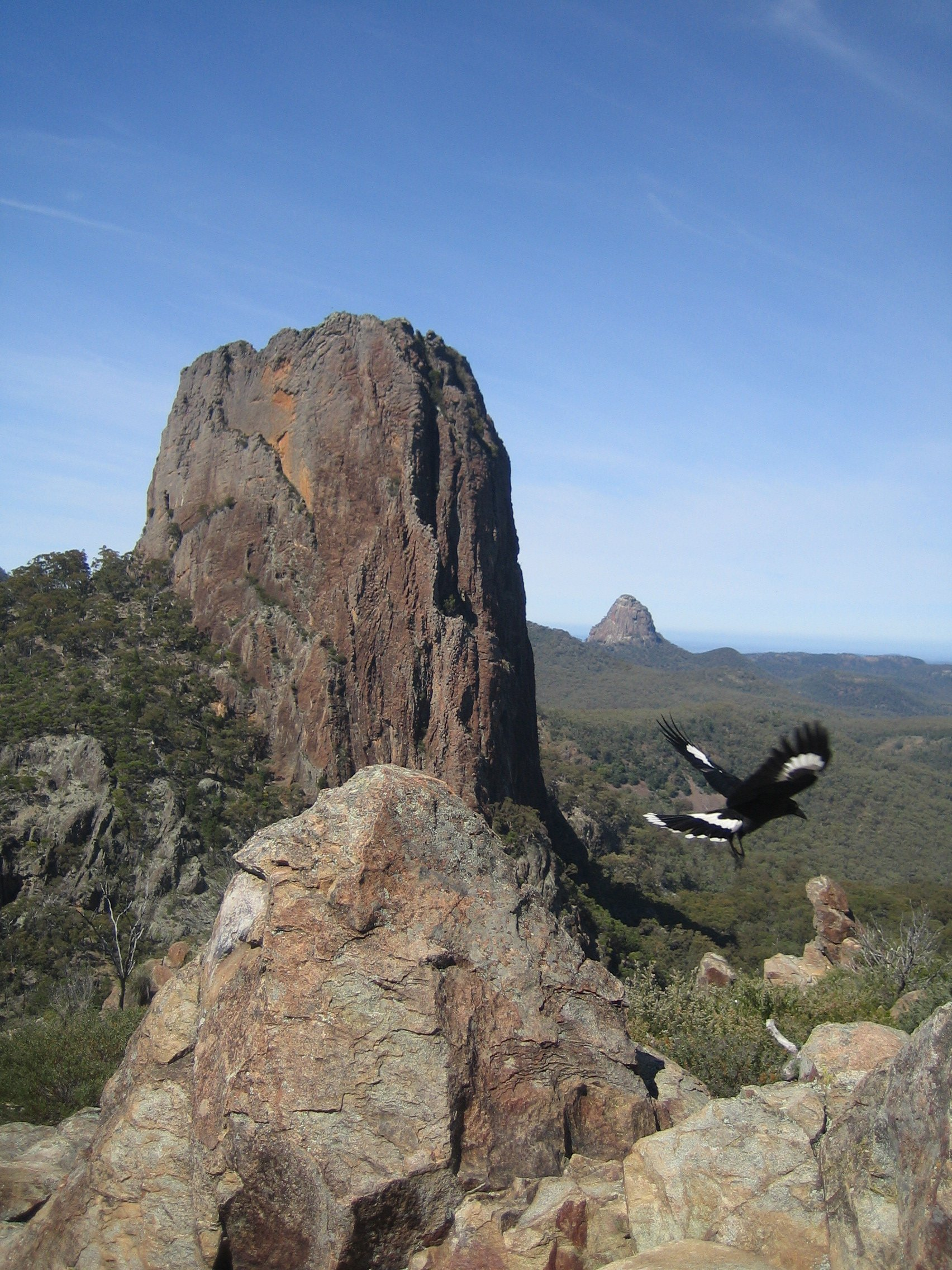
Warrumbungle Ranges, New South Wales

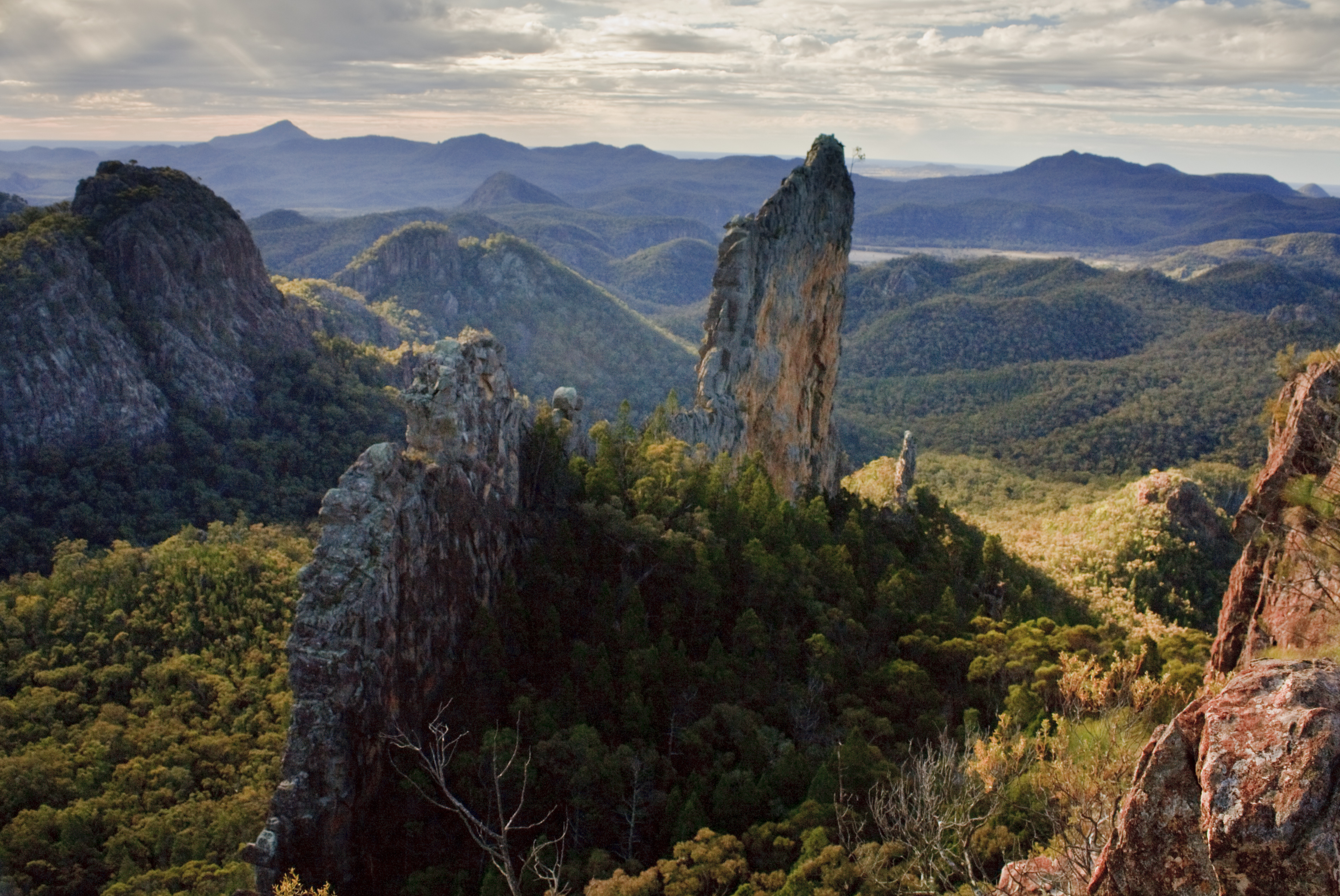
Warrumbungle breadknife

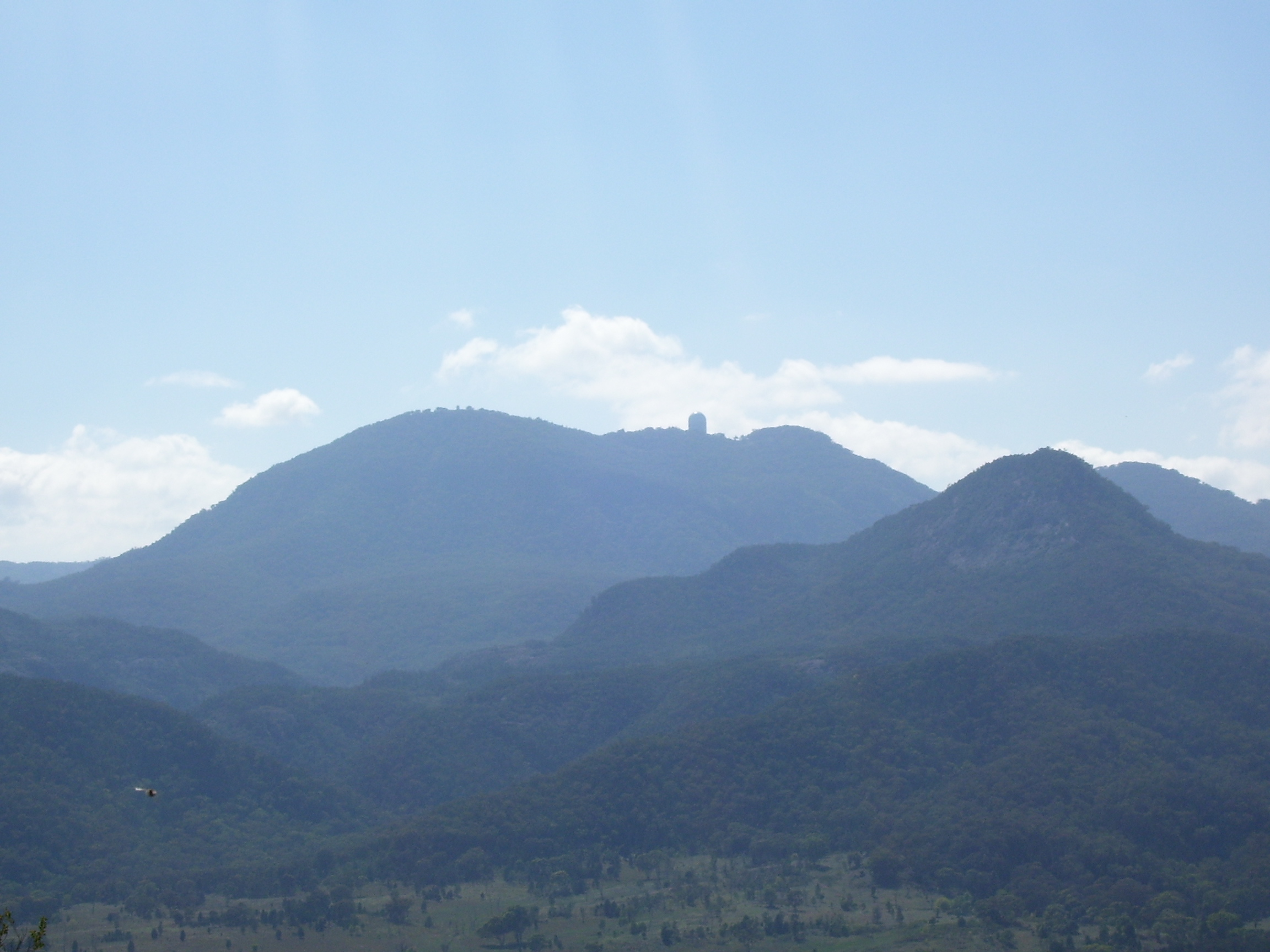
Siding Spring from Belougery Split Rock
