= Orandelbinia, New South Wales =

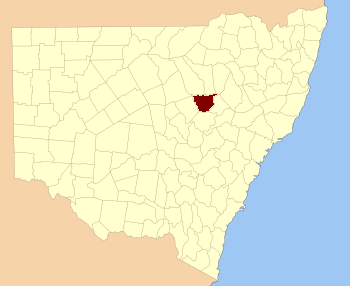
Gowen NSW.

Orandelbinia is a bounded rural locality of Warrumbungle Shire and a civil parish of Gowen County, New South Wales.

Orandelbinia, New South Wales is located at 31°32′54″S 149°11′04″E.

== History ==
Before European settlement the Weilwan were the traditional custodians of Orandelbinia parish.

The parish of Orandelbinia was based on the Orandelbinia Run established in the 19th century.
