= Boyben, New South Wales =

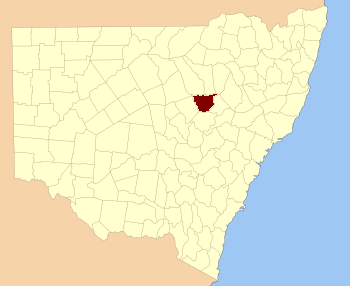
Gowen NSW.

Boyben, New South Wales is a bounded rural locality of Gilgandra Shire and a civil parish of Gowen County, a county of New South Wales.

The Parish is on the Castlereagh River, east of Gilgandra, New South Wales to the west. The main economic activity of the parish is agriculture.

The parish is on the traditional lands of the Weilwan.
