= Wingadee Shire =

Former local government area in New South Wales, Australia

Wingadee Shire New South Wales
- Established: 7 March 1906
- Abolished: 1 May 1952
- Council seat: Coonamble
- Region: Orana

Wingadee Shire was a local government area in the Orana region of New South Wales, Australia.

Wingadee Shire was proclaimed on 7 March 1906, one of 134 shires created after the passing of the Local Government (Shires) Act 1905.

The shire office was in Coonamble. Towns and villages in the shire included Gulargambone and Quambone.

Wingadee Shire amalgamated with the Municipality of Coonamble to form Coonamble Shire on 1 May 1952.
