= Gulargambone Parish, New South Wales =

Gulargambone Parish
- Town
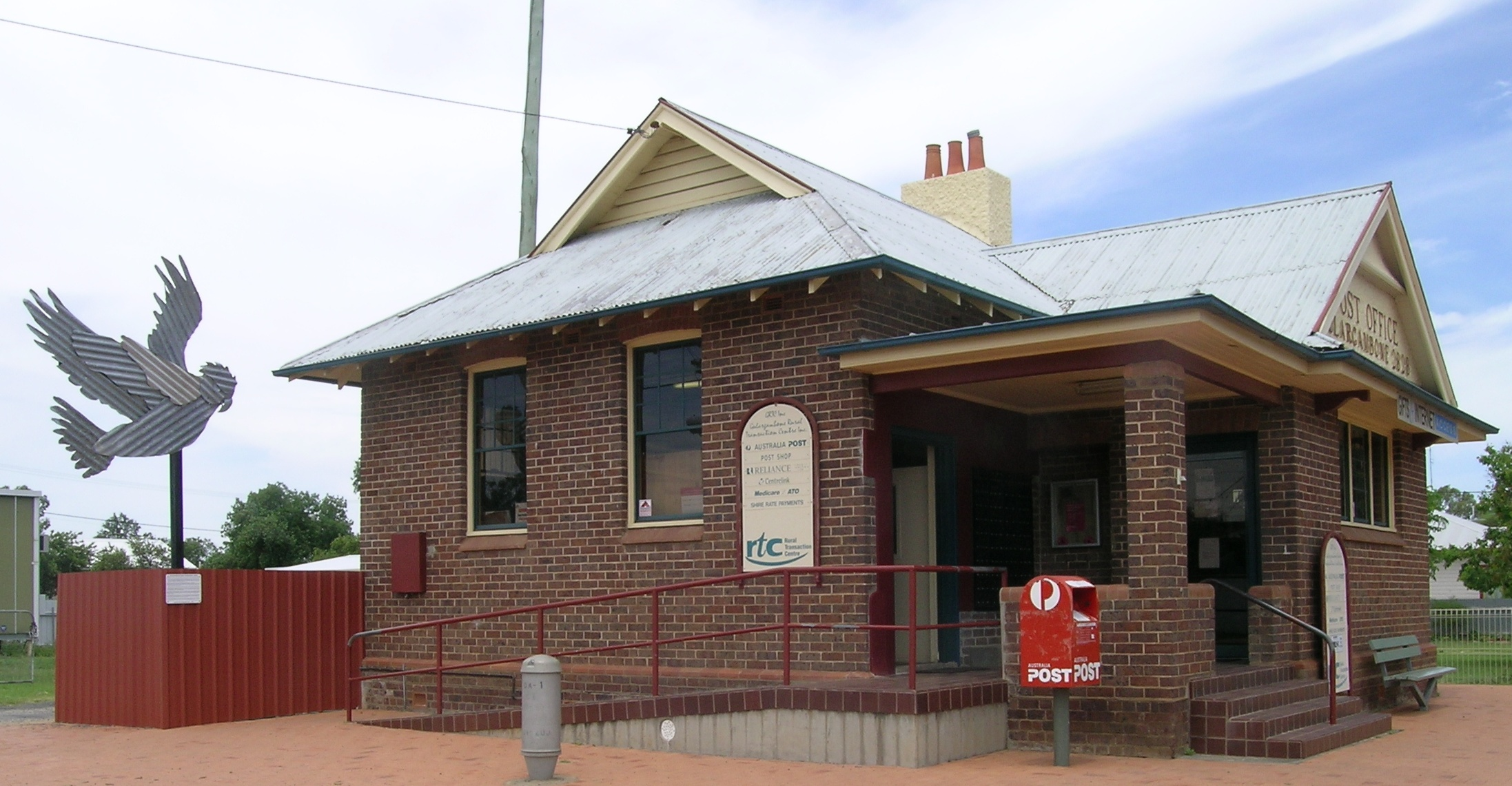
- One of the many sculptured galahs and the post office, Gulargambone

- Coordinates: 31°20′S 148°28′E
- Country: Australia
- State: New South Wales
- LGA: Coonamble Shire Council
- Location: 382 km (237 mi) NW of Sydney; 102 km (63 mi) N of Dubbo; 43 km (27 mi) S of Coonamble

Government
  - State electorate: Barwon
  - Federal division: Parkes

Population
  - Total: 395 (2011 census)
- Postcode: 2828
- County: Gowen

Gulargambone Parish, New South Wales is a bounded rural locality of Coonamble Shire and a civil parish of Gowen County, a cadastral division of New South Wales. The only town of the county is Gulargambone.

The Parish is on the banks of the Castlereagh River and the main settlement of the parish is Gulargambone, New South Wales.
