= Burrendah, New South Wales =

Burrendah
- Coordinates: 31°42′0″S 148°40′0″E
- Country: Australia
- State: New South Wales
- LGA: Gilgandra Shire
- Location: 460 km (290 mi) from Sydney; 66 km (41 mi) from Dubbo

Government
  - State electorate: Barwon
  - Federal division: Parkes
- Elevation: 282 m (925 ft)
- Postcode: 2827
- Mean max temp: 24.7 °C (76.5 °F)
- Mean min temp: 9.9 °C (49.8 °F)
- Annual rainfall: 557.2 mm (21.94 in)

Burrendah, New South Wales is a bounded rural locality of Gilgandra Shire and a civil parish of Gowen County, a county of New South Wales.

The Parish is on the Wallumburrawang Creek a tributary of the Castlereagh River, and the nearest settlement of the parish is Gilgandra, New South Wales to the west. The main economic activity of the parish is agriculture.

The parish is on the traditional lands of the Weilwan Aboriginal people.
