= Terrabile, New South Wales =

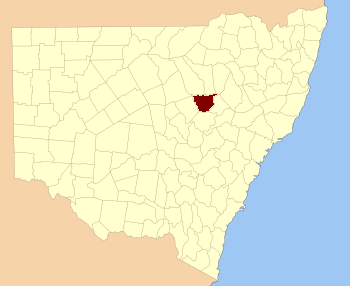
Gowen NSW.

Callangoan, New South Wales is a bounded rural locality of Gilgandra Shire, and a civil parish of Gowen County, a county of New South Wales.

The parish is on the Castlereagh River midway between Gulargambone and Gilgandra.

A settlement called Curbin was planned at the confluence of the Castlereagh River and Terrabile Creek, but it never developed. The main feature of the economy of the locality is agriculture.
