= Balumbridal, New South Wales =

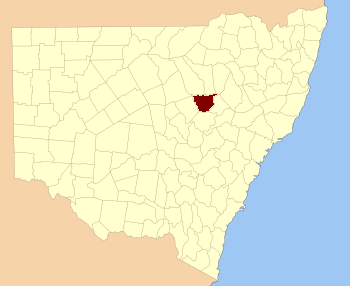
Gowen NSW.

Balumbridal is a bounded rural locality and a civil parish of Gowen County, New South Wales.

Balumbridal is midway between Tooraweenah and Coonabarabran, in Warrumbungle Shire located at 31°20′54″S 149°09′04″E. and is on Belar Creek, a tributary of the Castlereagh River.
