= Timor Parish, New South Wales =

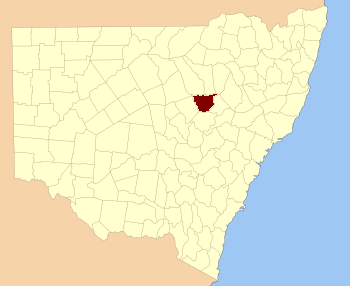
Gowen NSW.

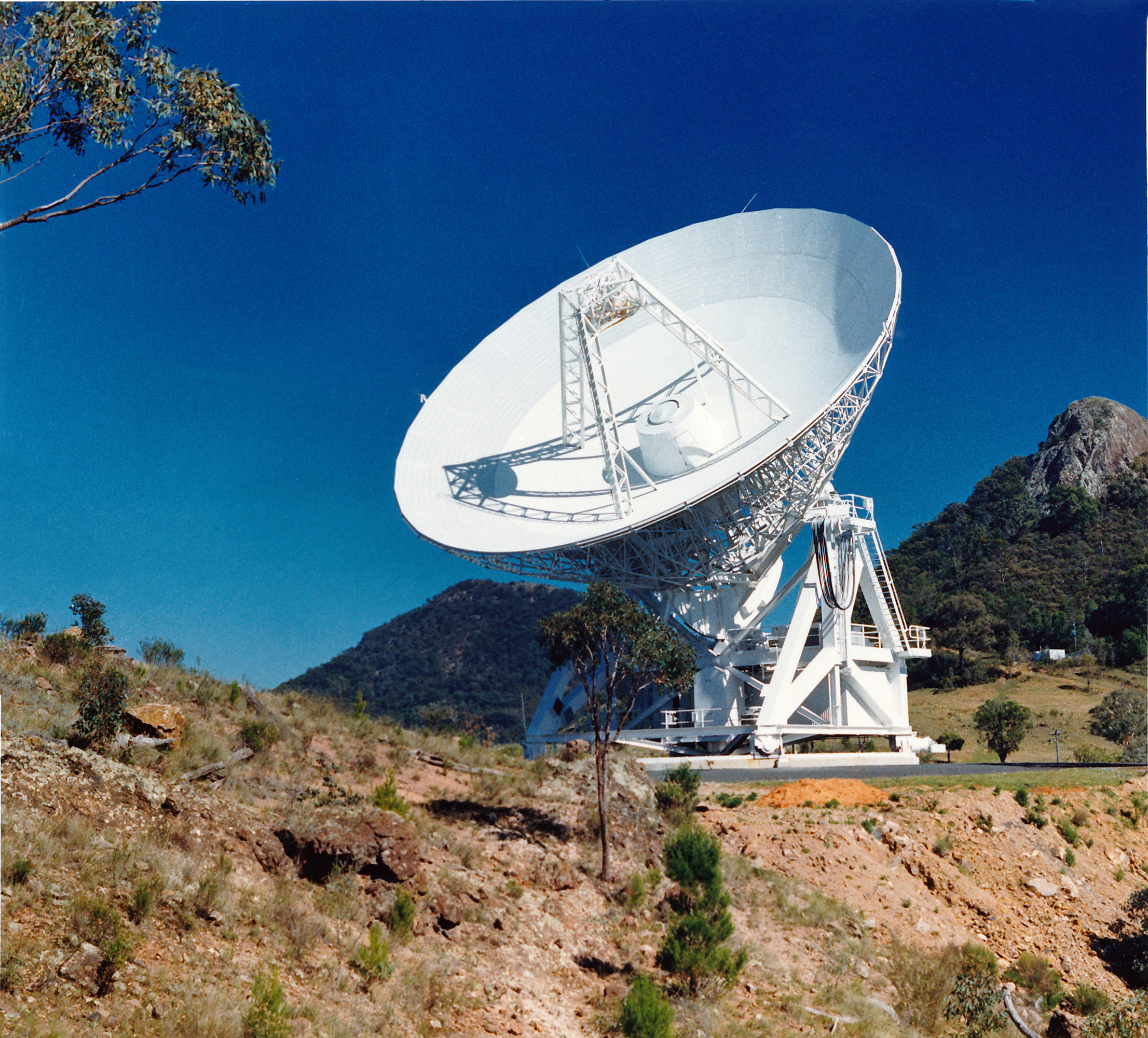
Mopra radio telescope Timor Parish.

Timor Parish is a civil parish of Gowen County, in the central north of New South Wales.

== Location ==
Timor Parish is on the headwaters of the Castlereagh River. The topography is dominated by Shawns Creek, the Castlereagh River, Warrumbungle National Park and the Nandi Hills. The nearest town of Timor Parish is Coonabarrabran.

The Warrumbungle Mountains are the remains of three ancient long extinct volcanoes and Timor Rock, a dominant feature of the parish is the remain of the volcanic plug of one of them.

== Economy ==
Much of the economy is agriculture based, though a large portion of the observatory is derived from Astronomy due to the presence of the Anglo-Australian Telescope (AAO) in the adjoining parish, and several private observatories making use of the dark sky protection for the AAO. The Mopra Radio Teliscope is in the parish.

Tourism is also a large feature of the economy. A large portion of the Warrumbungle National Park is also in the parish.
