= Caigan, New South Wales =

Rural locality and civil parish in Australia

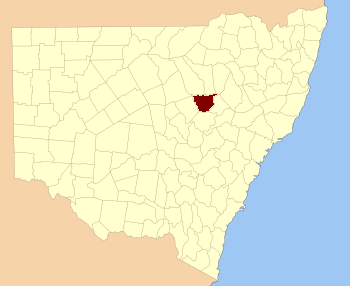
Gowen NSW.

Caigan, New South Wales is a bounded rural locality and civil parish of Gowen County, New South Wales.

Caigan Parish is on the opposite side of the Castlereagh River from the railway siding of Neilrex, New South Wales. The nearest town is Mendooran and the economy is based in agriculture.

The parish is on the traditional lands of the Weilwan Aboriginal people.
