= Yalcogrin, New South Wales =

Yalcogrin
- Coordinates: 31°42′0″S 148°40′0″E
- Country: Australia
- State: New South Wales
- LGA: Gilgandra Shire

Government
  - State electorate: Barwon
  - Federal division: Parkes
- Postcode: 2827
- Mean max temp: 24.7 °C (76.5 °F)
- Mean min temp: 9.9 °C (49.8 °F)
- Annual rainfall: 557.2 mm (21.94 in)

Yalcogrin is a bounded rural locality of Gilgandra Shire and a civil parish of Gowen County, New South Wales, Australia.

Yalcogrin is located at 31°37′54″S 148°41′04″ outside of Gilgndra township.
