= Urabrible, New South Wales =

Urabrible
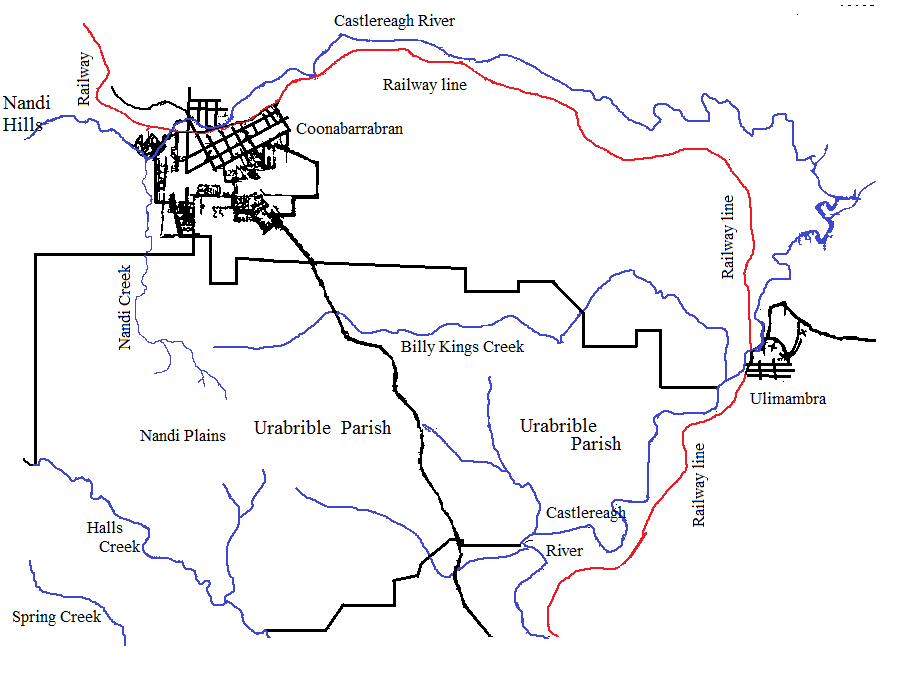
- Sketch Map of Urabrible Parish (NSW)

- Coordinates: 31°15′S 149°16′E
- Country: Australia
- State: New South Wales
- Postcode: 2357

Urabrible, New South Wales is a rural locality of Warrumbungle Shire in northern New South Wales and a civil parish of Gowen County, New South Wales.

Urabrible is centered on 31°19′54″S 149°17′04″E and is just south of Coonabarabran. The parish is bounded on the east by the Castlereagh River with the village of Ulamambri. The topography is dominated by Halls Creek and the Nandi Plains.
