= Baby, New South Wales =

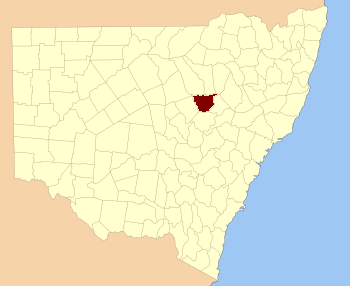
Gowen NSW

Baby, New South Wales is a bounded rural locality and a civil parish of Gowen County, in New South Wales.

Baby is in Warrumbungle Shire at 31°17′54″S 149°30′04″E on the Ulimambra Creek, a tributary of the Castlereagh River. The nearest town is the railway town of Ulimamambra.

The Baby State Forest and Baby Creek are named for the parish.
