= Cuttabulloo, New South Wales =

Cuttabulloo, New South Wales is a bounded rural locality and a civil parish of Gowen County, New South Wales.

Cuttabulloo is in Warrumbungle Shire located at 31°38′54″S 149°18′04″E on the Castlereagh River, on the opposite bank to Piambra Railway station.

The nearest town to the parish is Binnaway, New South Wales.
