= Greenbah, New South Wales =

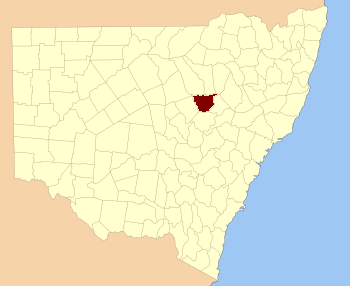
Gowen NSW.

Greenbah, New South Wales is a bounded rural locality in the Warrumbungle Shire and a civil parish of Gowen County, New South Wales.

Greenbah is located at 31°33′54″S 149°19′04″E on the opposite bank of the Castlereagh River from Binnaway, New South Wales.
