= Yarrawin, New South Wales =

Parish in New South Wales, Australia

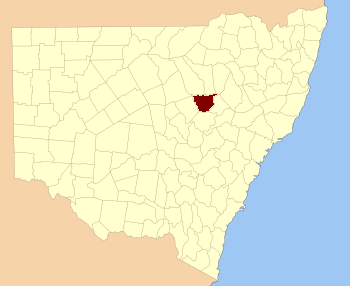
Gowen NSW.

Yarrawin, New South Wales is a bounded rural locality and a civil parish of Gowen County, New South Wales.

== Location ==
The parish is on the Castlereagh River, between Coonabarabran and Binnaway, New South Wales.

== History ==
Before European colonization the Weilwan were the traditional custodians of the parish. Yarrawin was named for the Yarragrin Run, established in the 19th century.
