= Belar, New South Wales =

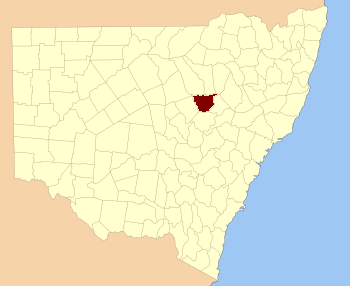
Gowen NSW.

Belar, New South Wales is a bounded rural locality of the Warrumbungle Shire and a civil parish of Gowen County, New South Wales. “Mobla” station near Binnaway is located at the south-east corner of Belar parish near the junction of Greenbah Creek with the Castlereagh River.

== Location ==
Belar parish is bounded by the Castlereagh River to the east and Greenbah Creek to the south, north-west of Binnaway.

== History ==
In 1873 it was recorded: "At Mobla a very neat bridge has been erected over the Greenbah Creek, just above its junction with the Castlereagh".
