= Nandi, New South Wales =

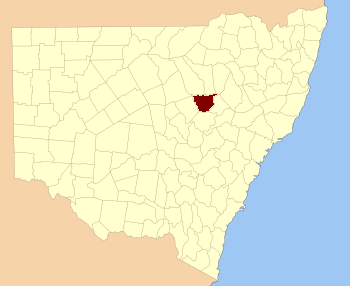
Gowen NSW.

Nandi Parish is a bounded rural locality and civil parish of Gowen County, in New South Wales.

== Location ==
The parish is on the headwaters of the Castlereagh River. The topography is dominated by Shawns Creek, the Castlereagh River and the Nandi Hills. The only town of Nandi Parish is Coonabarrabran.

== History ==
The traditional owners of the area were Kamilaroi people, and the last known large corroboree occurring there in 1848. In 2015 Nandi Common was NSW Government declared to be aboriginal land.

Much of the economy is agriculture based though a portion is derived from Astronomy due to the presence of the Anglo Australian Telescope in the adjoining parish. A portion of the Warrumbungle National Park is also in the parish.
