= Gundi, New South Wales =

Gundi, NSW
- Coordinates: 31°15′S 149°16′E
- Country: Australia
- State: New South Wales

Gundi, New South Wales is a bounded rural locality and civil parish of Gowen County, in New South Wales.

Gundi is in the Warrumbungle Shire located at 31°17′54″S 149°11′04″E. The Parish is adjacent to the town of Coonabarabran.
