= Pibbon, New South Wales =

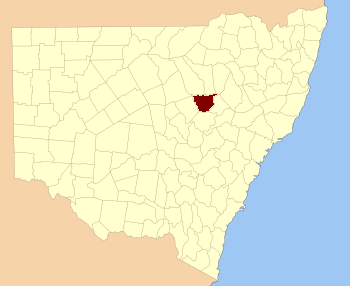
Gowen NSW.

Pibbon, New South Wales is a bounded rural locality and a civil parish of Gowen County, New South Wales.

Pibbon is in Gilgandra Shire located at 31°34′54″S 149°04′04″E and named for the Pibbon run established in the 19th century.
