= Eringanerin, New South Wales =

Eringanerin
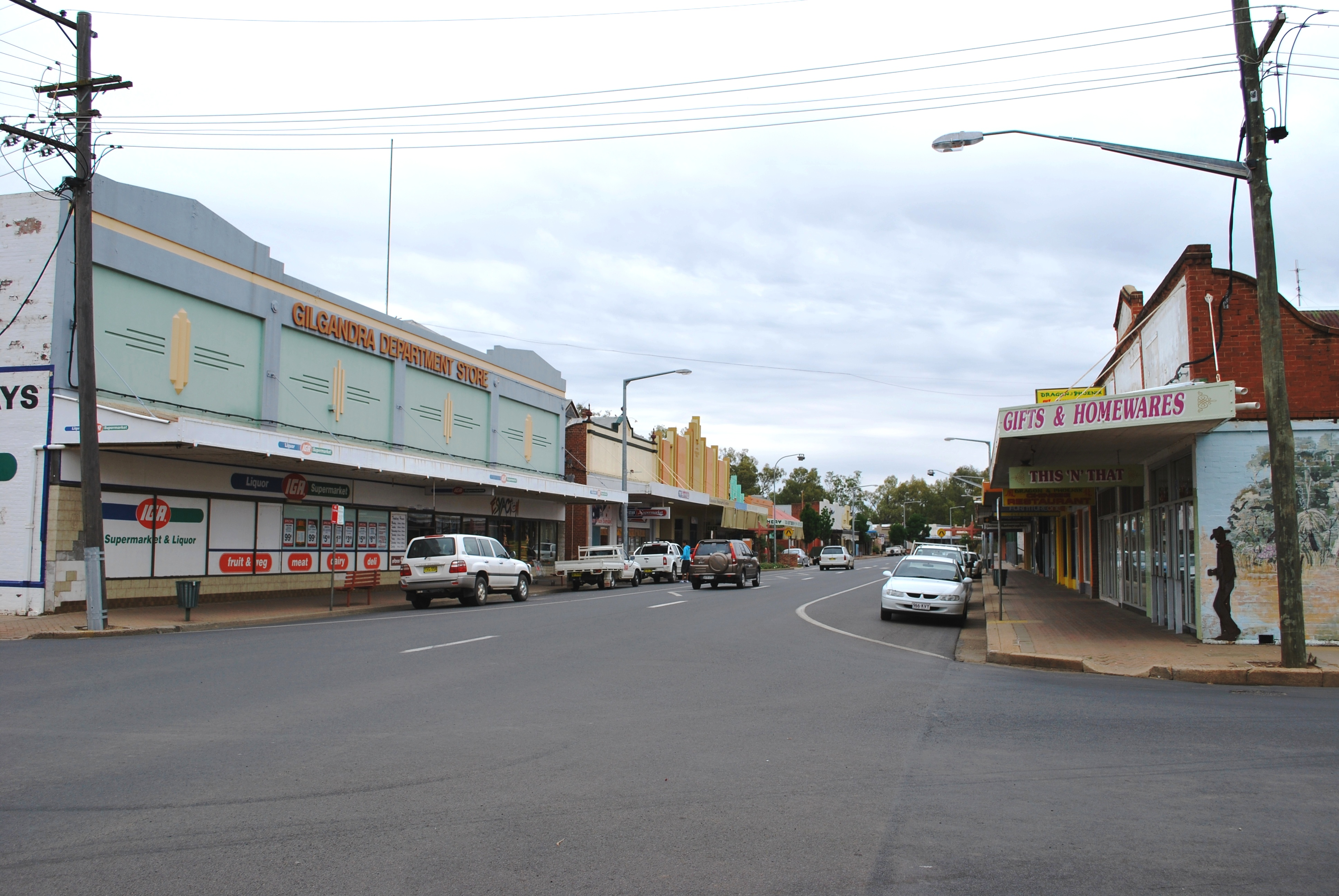
- The main street of Gilgandra Township

- Coordinates: 31°42′0″S 148°40′0″E
- Country: Australia
- State: New South Wales
- Region: Center West
- LGA: Gilgandra Shire
- Location: 460 km (290 mi) from Sydney; 66 km (41 mi) from Dubbo

Government
  - State electorate: Barwon
  - Federal division: Parkes
- Elevation: 282 m (925 ft)

Population
  - Total: 3,126 (2016 census)
- Postcode: 2827
- County: Gowen County
- Mean max temp: 24.7 °C (76.5 °F)
- Mean min temp: 9.9 °C (49.8 °F)
- Annual rainfall: 557.2 mm (21.94 in)

Eringanerin Parish, New South Wales is a bounded rural locality of Gilgandra Shire and a civil parish of Gowen County, New South Wales.

== Geography ==
The only town of the county is Gilgandra, seat of the shire.

The parish is on the Castlereagh River and Great Australian Basin and, specifically, over the Surat Sub-basin of the GAB.

== History ==
In 1888 Gilgandra township was proclaimed, and the first town blocks were sold in 1889 though as postal service (1867), school (1881) and court house (1884) were already established. The Council was constituted in 1906. During World War I, the so-called Coo-ee recruitment march to Sydney began here.
