= Bandulla, New South Wales =

Rural locality in New South Wales, Australia

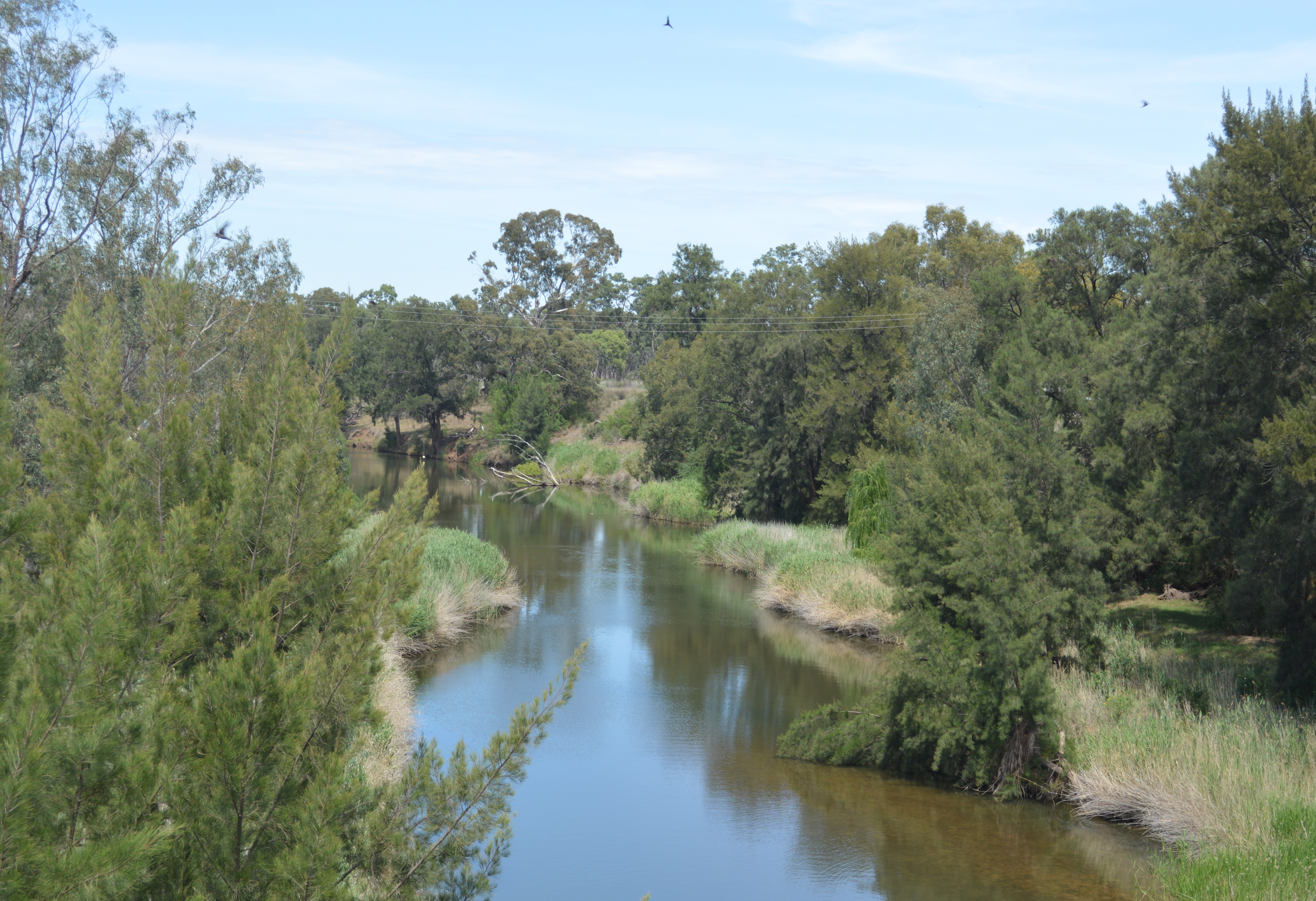
Castlereagh River at Bandulla, New South Wales

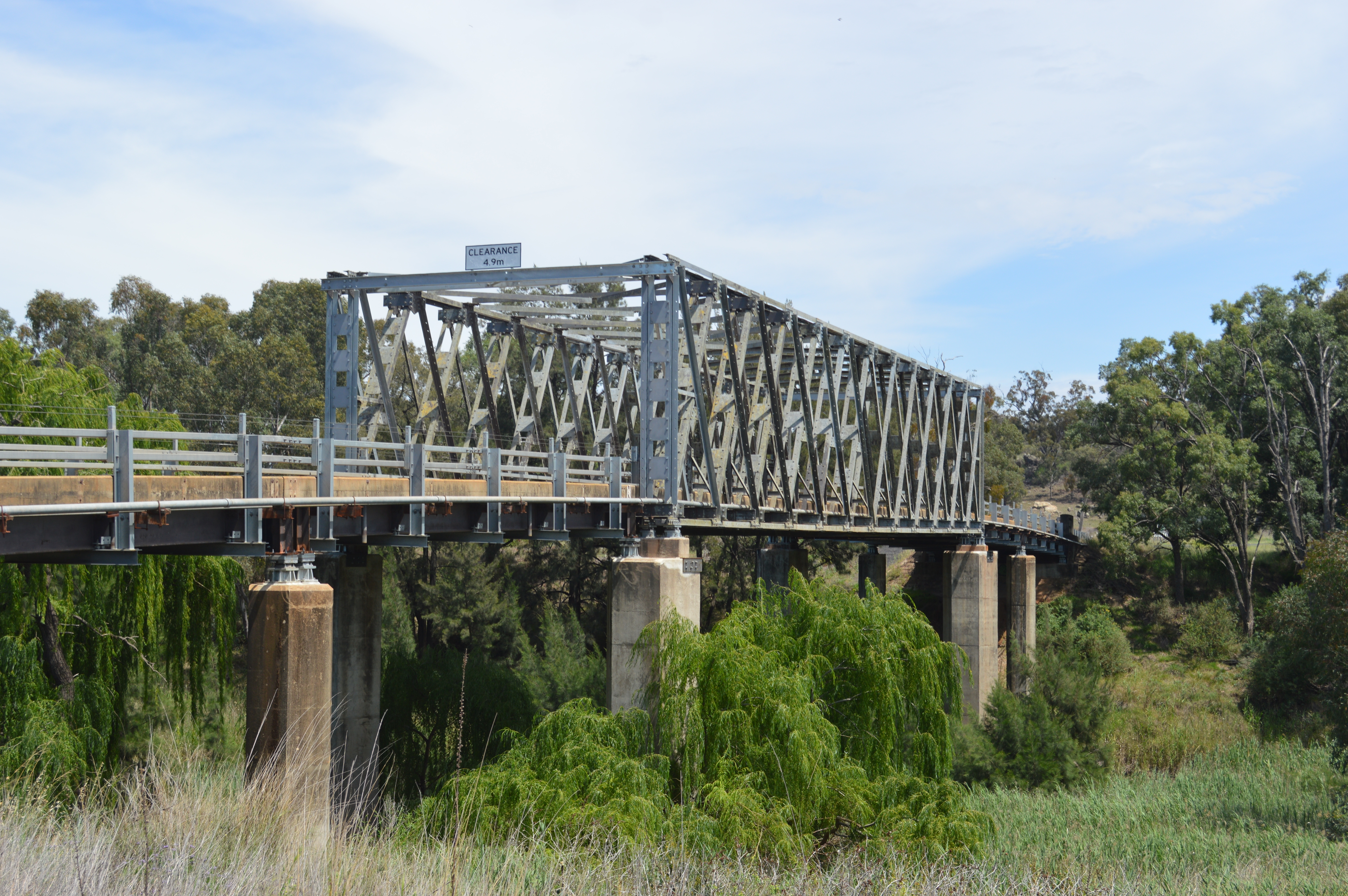
Bandulla from opposite bank at Mendooran

Bandulla, New South Wales is a rural locality and a civil Parish of Gowen County in central west New South Wales located at 31°49'11.7"S 149°07'04.2"E.

The civil parish is on the Castlereagh River and the town of Mendooran, New South Wales is on the opposite bank.

== History ==
The Bandulla, New South Wales was inhabited by the Wiradjuri tribe before white settlement. The first European to visit the area was surveyor John Evans who came as close as 10 kilometres in 1815. Two years later it was John Oxley's group that passed through the area while conducting one of the first inland expeditions.
