= List of local government areas in New South Wales =

This is a list of local government areas (LGA) of New South Wales in Australia.

As of 22 September 2022, there are 128 local government areas in New South Wales.

Local government area	Region	Area			Population				Density (people/km^{2})		References
Local government area	Region	km^{2}	sq mi	Rank	2016 census	Rank	2021 census	Rank	2021 census	Rank	References
City of Albury	Riverina	307	119	108	53,767	44	56,093	43	182.71	37	
Armidale Regional Council	New England	8,621	3,329	27	29,449	60	29,124	61	3.38	79	
Ballina Shire	Northern Rivers	484	187	93	41,790	50	46,296	49	95.65	40	
Balranald Shire	Riverina	21,693	8,376	7	2,287	126	2,208	126	0.10	123	
Bathurst Region	Central West	3,820	1,470	56	41,300	51	43,567	52	11.40	59	
Bayside Council	St George-Sutherland	50	19	115	156,058	17	175,184	17	3,503.68	12	
Bega Valley Shire	South Coast	6,279	2,424	37	33,253	57	35,942	58	5.72	69	
Bellingen Shire	Mid North Coast	1,602	619	81	12,668	84	13,253	81	8.27	64	
Berrigan Shire	Riverina	2,066	798	76	8,462	97	8,665	96	4.19	78	
Blacktown City Council	Western Sydney	247	95	104	336,962	2	396,776	1	1,606.38	21	
Bland Shire	Central West / Riverina	8,560	3,310	29	5,995	109	5,547	110	0.65	113	
Blayney Shire	Central West	1,525	589	82	7,257	100	7,497	100	4.92	72	
Blue Mountains, City of	Western Sydney / Blue Mountains	1,432	553	84	76,904	31	78,121	32	54.55	46	
Bogan Shire	Orana	14,611	5,641	12	2,692	124	2,467	124	0.17	121	
Bourke Shire	Orana	41,679	16,092	4	2,634	125	2,340	125	0.06	127	
Brewarrina Shire	Orana	19,188	7,409	8	1,651	128	1,356	128	0.07	126	
Broken Hill, City of	Far West	170	66	107	17,708	72	17,588	73	101.69	39	
Burwood Council	Inner West	7	2.7	130	36,809	55	40,217	55	5,745.28	4	
Byron Shire	Northern Rivers	567	219	92	31,556	58	36,116	57	63.70	45	
Cabonne Shire	Central West	6,026	2,327	38	13,386	80	13,766	79	2.28	86	
Camden Council	Macarthur / Western Sydney	201	78	105	78,219	29	119,325	24	593.66	27	
Campbelltown, City of	Macarthur / Western Sydney	312	120	99	157,006	16	176,519	16	565.77	28	
Canada Bay, City of	Inner West	20	7.7	122	88,015	27	89,177	29	4,458.85	7	
Canterbury-Bankstown, City of	Inner West / Western Sydney	72	28	113	346,302	1	371,006	2	5,152.86	6	
Carrathool Shire	Central West / Riverina	18,933	7,310	9	2,719	123	2,866	122	0.15	122	
Central Coast Council	Central Coast	1,681	649	79	327,736	3	346,596	3	206.18	36	
Central Darling Shire	Far West	53,511	20,661	2	1,833	127	1,725	127	0.03	128	
Cessnock, City of	Hunter	1,966	759	78	55,560	42	63,632	40	32.37	49	
Clarence Valley Council	Northern Rivers	10,441	4,031	18	50,671	45	54,115	45	5.18	70	
Cobar Shire	Orana	44,065	17,014	3	4,647	113	4,059	115	0.09	124	
Coffs Harbour, City of	Mid North Coast	1,175	454	87	72,944	33	78,759	31	67.03	44	
Coolamon Shire	Riverina	2,433	939	74	4,315	114	4,385	113	1.80	93	
Coonamble Shire	Orana	9,926	3,832	20	3,918	116	3,732	116	0.37	116	
Cootamundra-Gundagai Regional Council	Riverina	3,981	1,537	55	11,141	89	11,403	89	2.86	82	
Cowra Shire	Central West	2,810	1,080	68	12,460	85	12,724	86	4.53	75	
Cumberland City Council	Western Sydney	72	28	113	216,079	7	235,439	6	3,269.99	14	
Dubbo Regional Council	Orana	7,536	2,910	31	50,077	46	54,922	44	7.29	66	
Dungog Shire	Hunter	2,251	869	75	8,975	93	9,541	91	4.24	77	
Edward River Council	Riverina	8,881	3,429	25	8,851	95	8,456	98	0.95	107	
Eurobodalla Shire	South Coast	3,428	1,324	60	37,232	54	40,593	54	11.84	58	
Fairfield, City of	Western Sydney	102	39	110	198,817	11	208,475	13	2,043.87	20	
Federation Council	Riverina	5,685	2,195	41	12,777	83	12,899	83	2.27	87	
Forbes Shire	Central West	4,720	1,820	50	9,587	91	9,319	93	1.97	90	
Georges River Council	St George-Sutherland	38	15	117	146,841	19	152,274	19	4,007.21	9	
Gilgandra Shire	Orana	4,836	1,867	48	4,236	115	4,295	114	0.89	109	
Glen Innes Severn Council	New England	5,487	2,119	42	8,836	96	8,931	95	1.63	96	
Goulburn Mulwaree Council	Southern Tablelands	3,220	1,240	65	29,609	59	32,053	59	9.95	60	
Greater Hume Shire	Riverina	5,746	2,219	40	10,351	90	11,157	90	1.94	91	
Griffith, City of	Riverina	1,640	630	80	25,641	63	27,086	63	16.51	55	
Gunnedah Shire	New England	4,994	1,928	46	12,215	86	12,929	82	2.59	84	
Gwydir Shire	New England	9,453	3,650	22	5,258	112	4,910	112	0.52	114	
Hawkesbury, City of	Western Sydney	2,793	1,078	70	64,592	38	67,207	39	24.06	50	
Hay Shire	Riverina	11,326	4,373	16	2,946	121	2,882	121	0.25	118	
Hills Shire, The	Hills District	401	155	96	157,243	15	191,876	14	478.49	31	
Hilltops Council	Southern Tablelands	7,139	2,756	34	18,498	71	19,254	71	41.67	47	
Hornsby Shire	North Shore / Northern Suburbs	462	178	94	142,667	20	151,811	20	328.59	33	
Hunter's Hill, Municipality of	Northern Suburbs	6	2.3	131	13,999	79	13,559	80	2,259.83	19	
Inner West Council	Inner West	35	14	119	182,043	14	182,818	15	5,223.37	5	
Inverell Shire	New England	8,606	3,323	28	16,483	73	17,853	72	2.07	89	
Junee Shire	Riverina	2,030	780	77	6,295	104	6,415	103	3.16	80	
Kempsey Shire	Mid North Coast	3,380	1,310	63	28,885	61	30,688	60	9.08	63	
Kiama, Municipality of	Illawarra	258	100	102	21,464	67	23,074	67	89.43	41	
Ku-ring-gai Council	North Shore	86	33	111	118,053	22	124,076	23	1,442.74	22	
Kyogle Council	Northern Rivers	3,589	1,386	59	8,940	94	9,359	92	2.61	83	
Lachlan Shire	Central West	7,431	2,869	32	6,194	105	6,094	105	0.82	110	
Lake Macquarie, City of	Hunter	648	250	91	197,371	12	213,845	11	330	32	
Lane Cove, Municipality of	North Shore	11	4.2	126	36,051	56	39,438	56	3,585.27	11	
Leeton Shire	Riverina	1,167	451	88	11,168	88	11,452	88	9.81	61	
Lismore, City of	Northern Rivers	1,290	500	86	43,135	49	44,334	51	34.37	48	
Lithgow, City of	Central West / Blue Mountains	4,551	1,757	52	21,090	68	20,842	69	4.58	74	
Liverpool, City of	Western Sydney	306	118	100	204,326	9	233,446	7	762.89	25	
Liverpool Plains Shire	New England	5,086	1,964	45	7,687	99	7,551	99	1.48	98	
Lockhart Shire	Riverina	2,895	1,118	67	3,119	119	3,319	119	0.08	125	
Lord Howe Island		15	5.8	123	382	130	445				
Maitland, City of	Hunter	392	151	97	77,305	30	90,226	28	230.17	35	
Mid-Coast Council	Mid North Coast	10,053	3,881	19	90,303	26	96,579	27	9.60	62	
Mid-Western Regional	Central West	8,737	3,373	26	24,076	64	25,713	64	2.94	81	
Moree Plains Shire	New England	17,930	6,920	10	13,159	81	12,751	85	0.71	112	
Mosman Council	North Shore	9	3.5	128	28,475	62	28,329	62	3,147.67	17	
Murray River Council	Riverina	11,865	4,581	15	11,680	87	12,850	84	1.08	104	
Murrumbidgee Council	Riverina	6,880	2,660	36	3,836	117	3,353	118	0.49	115	
Muswellbrook Shire	Hunter	3,405	1,315	62	16,086	75	16,357	75	4.80	73	
Nambucca Shire	Mid North Coast	1,491	576	83	19,212	70	20,407	70	13.69	57	
Narrandera Shire	Riverina	4,117	1,590	53	5,853	110	5,698	108	1.38	100	
Narrabri Shire	North West Slopes / Northern Tablelands	13,031	5,031	13	13,084	82	12,703	87	0.97	106	
Narromine Shire	Orana	5,264	2,032	44	6,444	103	6,360	104	1.21	101	
Newcastle, City of	Hunter	187	72	106	155,411	18	168,873	18	903.06	24	
Northern Beaches Council	Northern Beaches	254	98	103	252,878	4	263,554	4	1,037.61	23	
North Sydney Council	North Shore	11	4.2	126	67,658	36	68,950	36	6,268.18	3	
Oberon Shire	Central West	3,659	1,413	58	5,301	111	5,580	109	1.52	97	
Orange, City of	Central West	285	110	101	40,344	52	43,512	53	152.67	38	
Parkes Shire	Central West	5,958	2,300	39	14,608	76	14,361	77	2.41	85	
Parramatta Council, City of	Western Sydney / Northern Suburbs	82	32	112	226,149	5	256,729	5	3,130.84	18	
Penrith, City of	Western Sydney	405	156	95	196,066	13	217,664	9	537.44	29	
Port Macquarie-Hastings Council	Mid North Coast	3,686	1,423	57	78,539	28	86,762	30	23.54	52	
Port Stephens Council	Hunter	979	378	89	69,556	34	75,276	35	76.89	42	
Queanbeyan–Palerang Regional Council	Southern Tablelands	8,960	3,460	23	56,027	41	63,304	41	7.06	67	
Randwick, City of	Eastern Suburbs	36	14	118	140,660	21	134,252	21	3,729.22	10	
Richmond Valley Council	Northern Rivers	3,051	1,178	66	22,807	66	23,565	66	7.72	65	
Ryde, City of	Northern Suburbs	41	16	116	116,302	23	129,123	22	3,149.34	16	
Singleton Council	Hunter	4,893	1,889	47	22,987	65	24,577	65	5.02	71	
Shellharbour, City of	Illawarra / South Coast	147	57	109	68,460	35	76,271	33	518.85	30	
Shoalhaven, City of	South Coast	4,567	1,763	51	99,650	24	108,531	25	23.76	51	
Snowy Monaro Regional Council	Snowy Mountains / Monaro	15,162	5,854	11	20,218	69	21,666	68	1.43	99	
Snowy Valleys Council	Riverina	8,960	3,460	23	14,395	77	14,891	76	1.66	95	
Strathfield, Municipality of	Inner West	14	5.4	124	40,312	53	45,593	50	3,256.64	15	
Sutherland Shire	St George-Sutherland	370	140	98	218,464	6	230,211	8	622.19	26	
Sydney, City of	Sydney CBD	25	9.7	120	208,374	8	211,632	12	8,465.28	1	
Tamworth Regional Council	New England	9,892	3,819	21	59,663	40	63,070	42	6.37	68	
Temora Shire	Riverina	2,802	1,082	69	6,110	106	6,034	106	2.15	88	
Tenterfield Shire	New England	7,332	2,831	33	6,628	102	6,810	102	0.93	108	
Tweed Shire	Northern Rivers	1,321	510	85	91,371	25	97,392	26	73.72	43	
Unincorporated Far West	Far West	93,300	36,000	1	698^{a}	129	1,016	129	0.01	129	
Upper Hunter Shire	Hunter	8,096	3,126	30	14,112	78	14,229	78	1.76	94	
Upper Lachlan Shire	Southern Tablelands	7,102	2,742	35	7,695	98	8,514	97	1.20	102	
Uralla Shire	New England	3,230	1,250	64	6,048	108	5,971	107	1.85	92	
Wagga Wagga, City of	Riverina	4,826	1,863	49	62,385	39	67,609	38	14	56	
Walcha Shire	New England	2,621	1,012	72	3,092	120	3,016	120	1.15	103	
Walgett Shire	Orana	22,336	8,624	6	6,107	107	5,253	111	0.23	120	
Warren Shire	Orana	10,760	4,150	17	2,732	122	2,550	123	0.24	119	
Warrumbungle Shire	Orana	12,380	4,780	14	9,384	92	9,225	94	0.74	111	
Waverley Council	Eastern Suburbs	9	3.5	128	66,812	37	68,605	37	7,622.78	2	
Weddin Shire	Central West	3,410	1,320	61	3,664	118	3,608	117	1.06	105	
Wentworth Shire	Riverina	26,269	10,143	5	6,794	101	7,453	101	0.28	117	
Willoughby, City of	North Shore	23	8.9	121	74,302	32	75,613	34	3,287.52	13	
Wingecarribee Shire	Illawarra / Southern Highlands	2,689	1,038	71	47,882	48	52,709	48	19.60	54	
Wollondilly Shire	Macarthur / Western Sydney	2,560	990	73	48,519	47	53,961	46	21.08	53	
Wollongong, City of	Illawarra	684	264	90	203,630	10	214,564	10	313.69	34	
Woollahra, Municipality of	Eastern Suburbs	12	4.6	125	54,240	43	53,496	47	4,458	8	
Yass Valley Council	Southern Tablelands / Riverina	3,999	1,544	54	16,142	74	17,281	74	4.32	76	

== See also ==
- Local government areas of New South Wales
- List of former local government areas in New South Wales
