= Yarragrin =

Yarragrin New South Wales
- Coordinates: 31°39′51″S 149°08′31″E
- Population: 47 (SAL 2021)

Yarragrin, New South Wales is a locality and civil parish of Warrumbungle Shire in New South Wales, Australia.

It is southwest of the town of Binnaway and 15 km (9 mi) south of Coonabarabran.

The parish was named for Yarragrin Run established in the 19th century.
