= Tannabar =

Locality in New South Wales, Australia

Tannabar, New South Wales is a bounded rural locality in New South Wales. The suburb is in the outskirts of the town of Coonabarabran in warrumbungle shire Gowan County, New South Wales.
