= Warrumbungle National Park =

National park in Australia

- IUCN category II (national park)
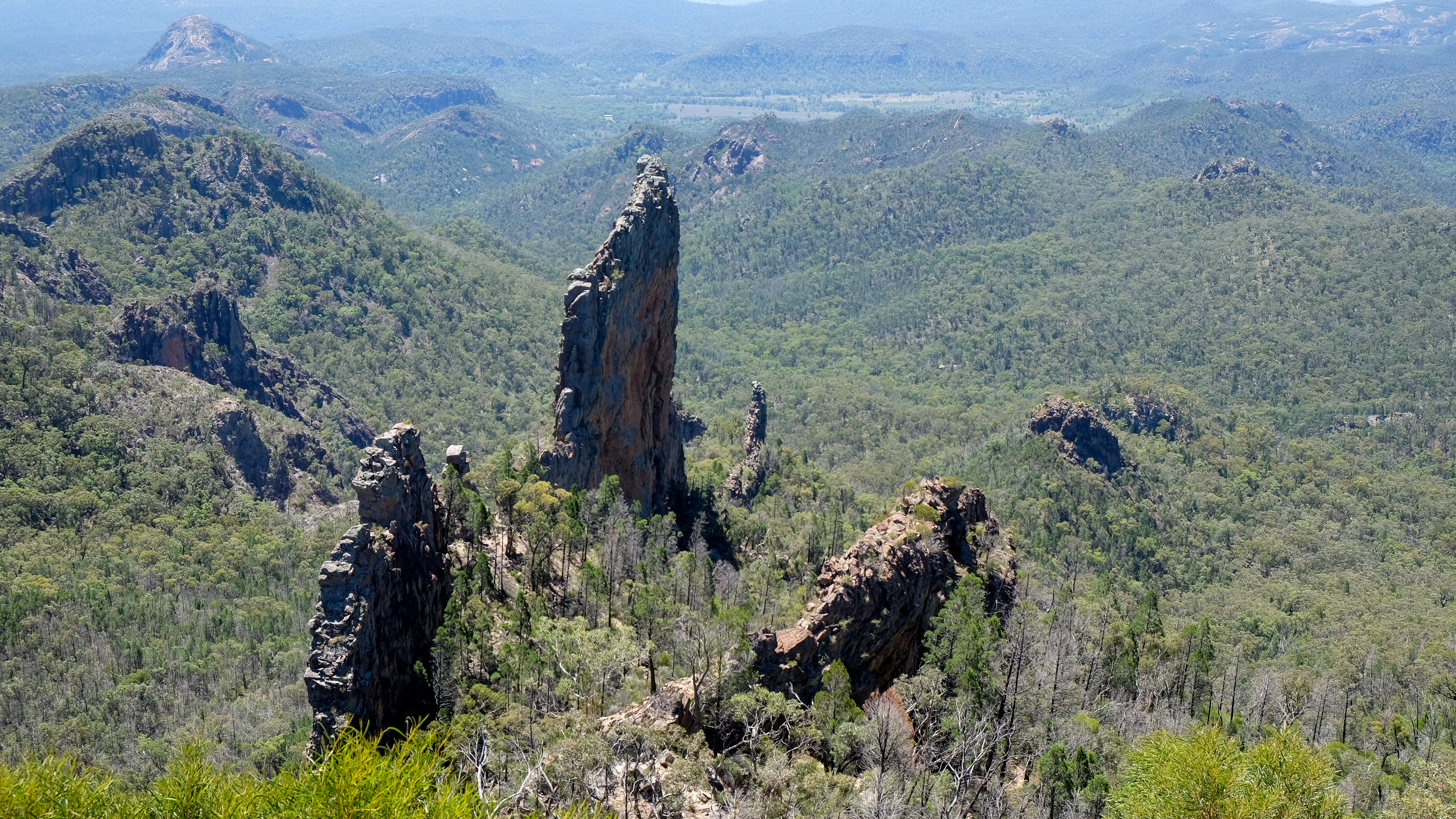
- The Breadknife

- Location within New South Wales
- Location: New South Wales
- Nearest city: Coonabarabran
- Area: 233.11 km^{2} (90.00 sq mi)
- Visitors: 35000 (in 2011)
- Governing body: National Parks and Wildlife Service (New South Wales)
- Website: Official website

Warrumbungle National Park is a heritage listed national park located in the Orana region of New South Wales, Australia. The national park is located approximately 550 kilometres (340 mi) northwest of Sydney and contained within 23,311 hectares (57,600 acres). The park attracts approximately 35,000 visitors per annum.

The national park is based on the geographical Warrumbungle Mountain Range, sometimes shortened to the Warrumbungles, and thus the park name is often heard in the plural. The park lies within the Pilliga Important Bird Area, so identified by BirdLife International because of its importance for a range of woodland bird species, many of which are threatened.

Warrumbungle National Park was added to the Australian National Heritage List in December 2006.

On 4 July 2016, the park was the first within Australia to be certified as a Dark Sky Park by the International Dark Sky Association.

== Access ==
The nearest towns to the park are Baradine, Coonabarabran, Coonamble, Gilgandra, Gulargambone, and Tooraweenah. Access via Coonabarabran to the east is by 27 kilometres (17 mi) of sealed road called the John Renshaw Parkway, built in 1966. Via Coonamble to the west, access is by a 57 kilometres (35 mi) long road with some gravel.

The park is contained within three local government areas: Warrumbungle Shire to the east, Gilgandra Shire to the south and Coonamble Shire to the west.

== Features ==
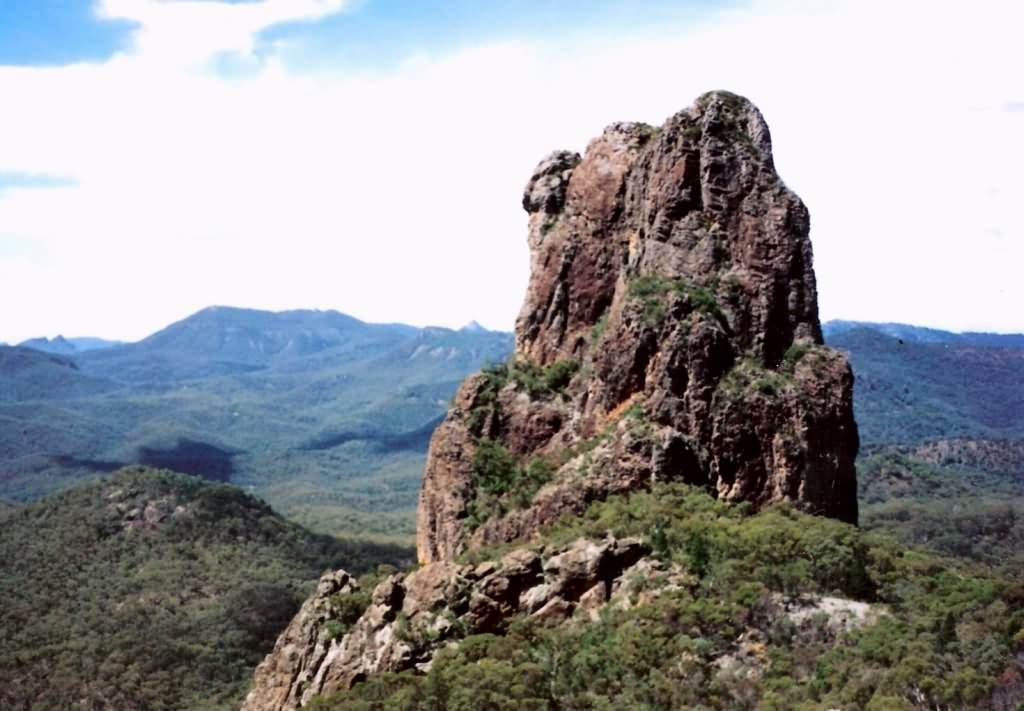
Belougery Spire

Located within the large area of temperate savanna grasslands the park incorporates the most spectacular part of the Warrumbungle mountains, a region of past volcanic activity with unusual lava formations. Some of the most well-known rock formations include Belougery Spire, Bluff Mountain, Mount Exmouth (tallest mountain in the park), The Breadknife, Split Rock, Fans Horizon and Crater Bluff.

There are many scenic bushwalks and both rock climbing and abseiling are popular. Though the park preserved habitat for koalas in the past, a massive 2013 fire decimated the koala population; none are thought to have survived.

Located immediately adjacent to the national park is the Siding Spring Observatory. The observatory, officially opened in 1965, was constructed on the boundary of the park partly because the park provided a light-free environment. This scientific facility consists of several internationally important telescopes and has considerable socio-economic importance to the local Coonabarabran community.

== Facilities ==
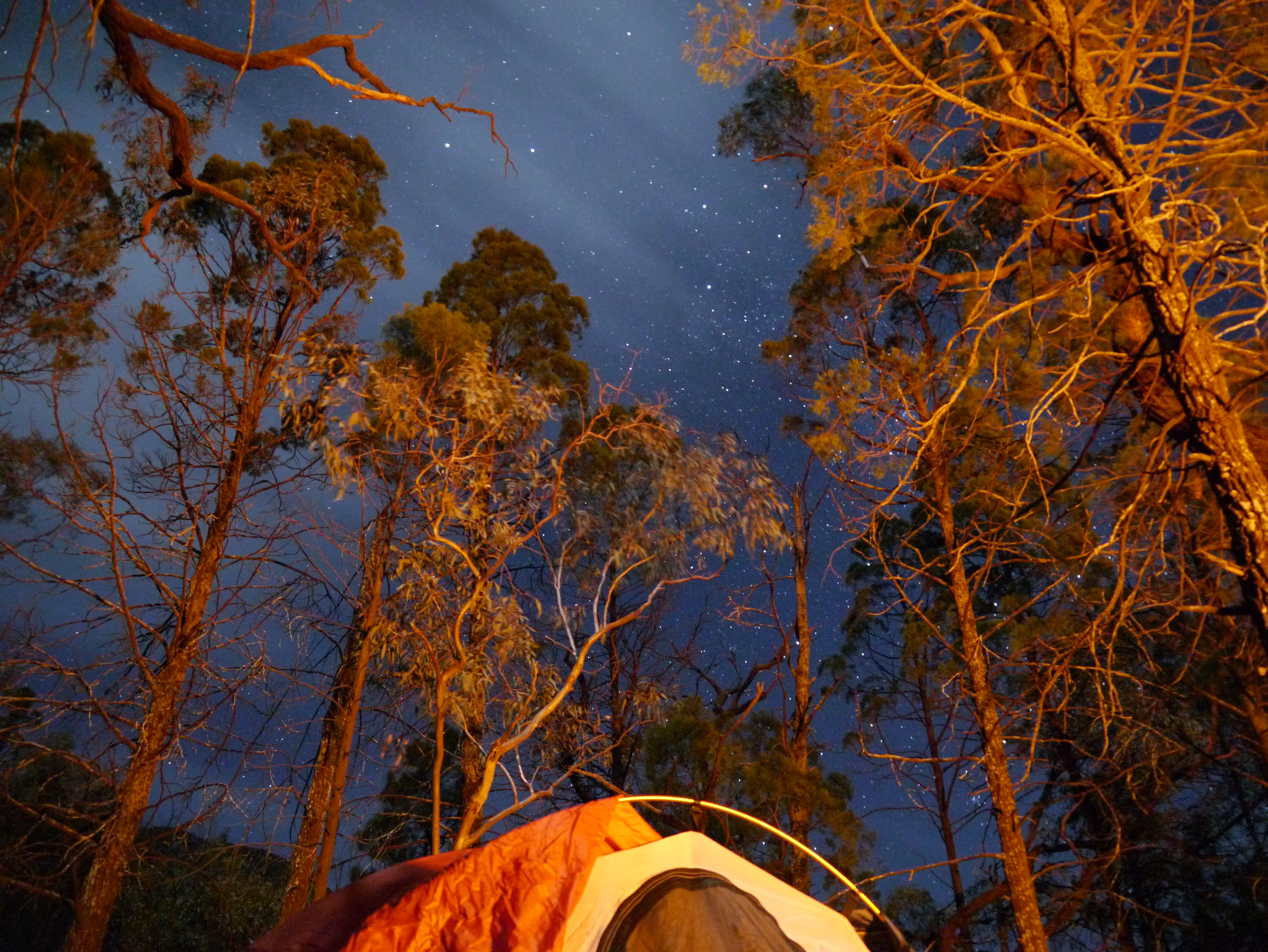
A view of the night sky at Dows Camp, one of the walk-in campsites in the National Park

There are four vehicle-based campsites and multiple walk-in campsites. All camping in the park is only permitted after obtaining a permit. There is a visitors’ centre for bookings and arranging access to hut and gated camping. The park also caters for large groups, eg school, club. There are free electric barbecues available however firewood is not supplied or to be collected within park grounds.

== History ==
A proposal to reserve the more scenic parts of the Warrumbungle Range as the Warrumbungle National Monument was first initiated by the National Parks and Primitive Areas Council in 1936. The area was first proclaimed as a reserve in 1953. In 1967 management of the park was signed over to the NSW National Parks & Wildlife Service. The construction of a network of walking tracks done by hand was headed by the parks first ranger, Carl Dow. The park was added to the list of the National Heritage in December 2006, in recognition of the park's importance as an extensive and spectacular geomorphological site with bold volcanic landforms that are unrivalled anywhere else in Australia; for its unique values as a transition zone between the arid western and wetter coastal zones; and its significance as an important refugium in inland south-east Australia.

== 2013 bushfire ==
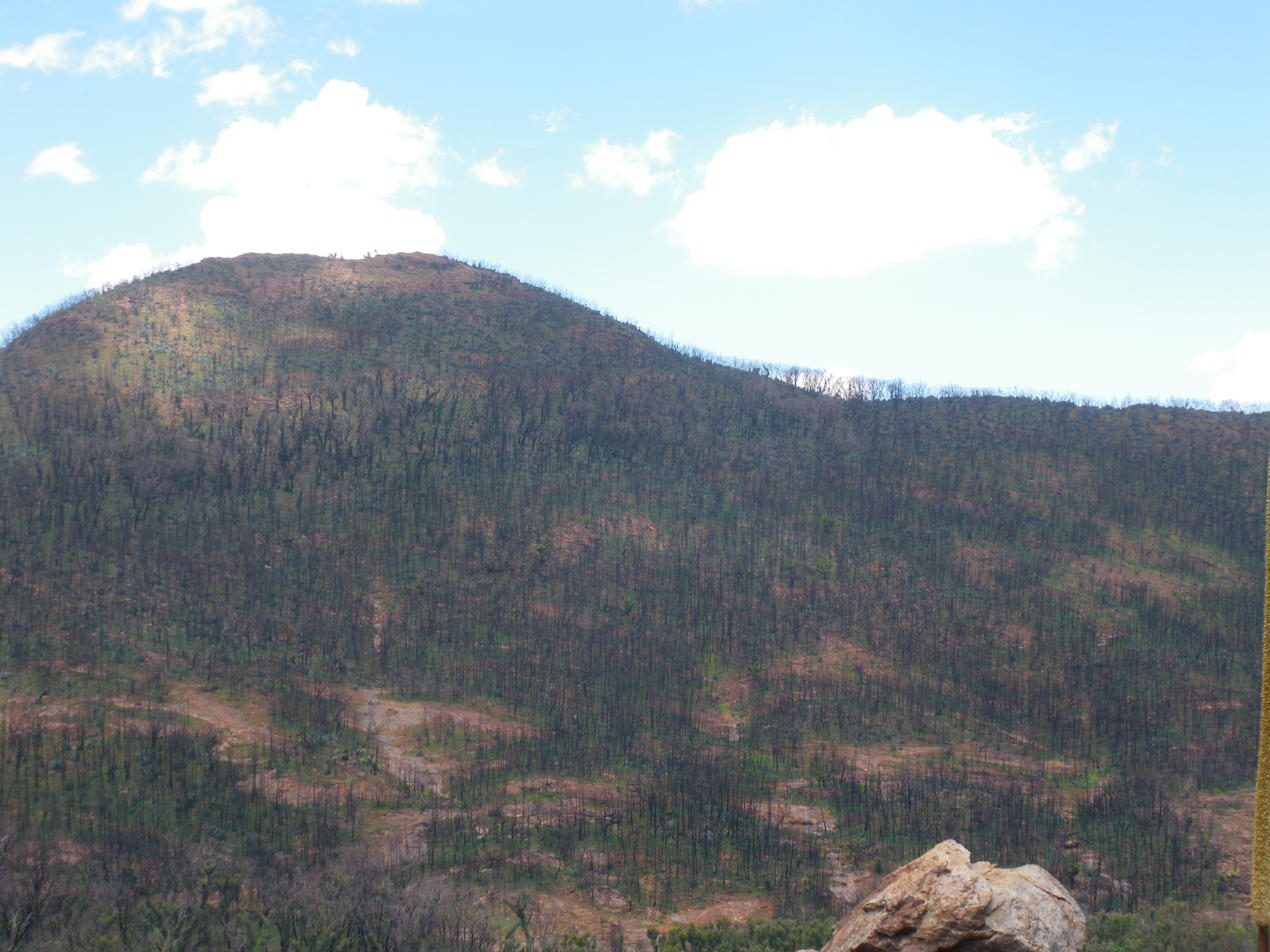
Warrumbungle National Park after January 2013 fire

In January 2013 about 80% of the national park was destroyed in a conflagration (thought to have been started by lightning) that burned much of the area surrounding the park as well as destroying dozens of homes. The visitor centre and museum were wiped out, as well as railings and viewing platforms throughout the park. The park was closed after the fire, but has since reopened after extensive remediation works.

== In popular culture ==
The national park was used as a filming location for the video for singer David Bowie's 1983 single "Let's Dance", centring on The Breadknife.

The Japanese anime "Adventures of the Little Koala" takes place within the shadow of The Breadknife.

== See also ==
- Protected areas of New South Wales
