= Quambone =

- Town
- Coordinates: 30°55′57″S 147°52′41″E
- Country: Australia
- State: New South Wales
- LGA: Coonamble Shire
- Location: 591 km (367 mi) NW of Sydney; 217 km (135 mi) NW of Dubbo; 56 km (35 mi) W of Coonamble

Government
  - State electorate: Barwon
  - Federal division: Parkes

Population
  - Total: 247 (2011 census)
- Postcode: 2831

Quambone is a locality in New South Wales, Australia. Quambone is in the Coonamble Shire local government area, 591 kilometres (367 mi) north west of the state capital, Sydney and 56 kilometres (35 mi) west of Coonamble.

The locality is centred at the junction of roads to Warren, Coonamble and Carinda. At the 2011 census, Quambone and the surrounding area had a population of 247.

Quambone is known as the gateway to the Macquarie Marshes Nature Reserve.

The name derives from a Ngiyampaa word, kuwaympuyan meaning 'having blood'.

It has a hotel/motel, general store and swimming pool, and a public school. It has regular Catholic and Anglican church services. The Quambone Library (operated by the Coonamble Shire) is famously referred to as the smallest library in New South Wales

Doug Moppett, a long-term member of the Parliament of New South Wales, lived at Quambone.
