= Gulargambone =

- Town
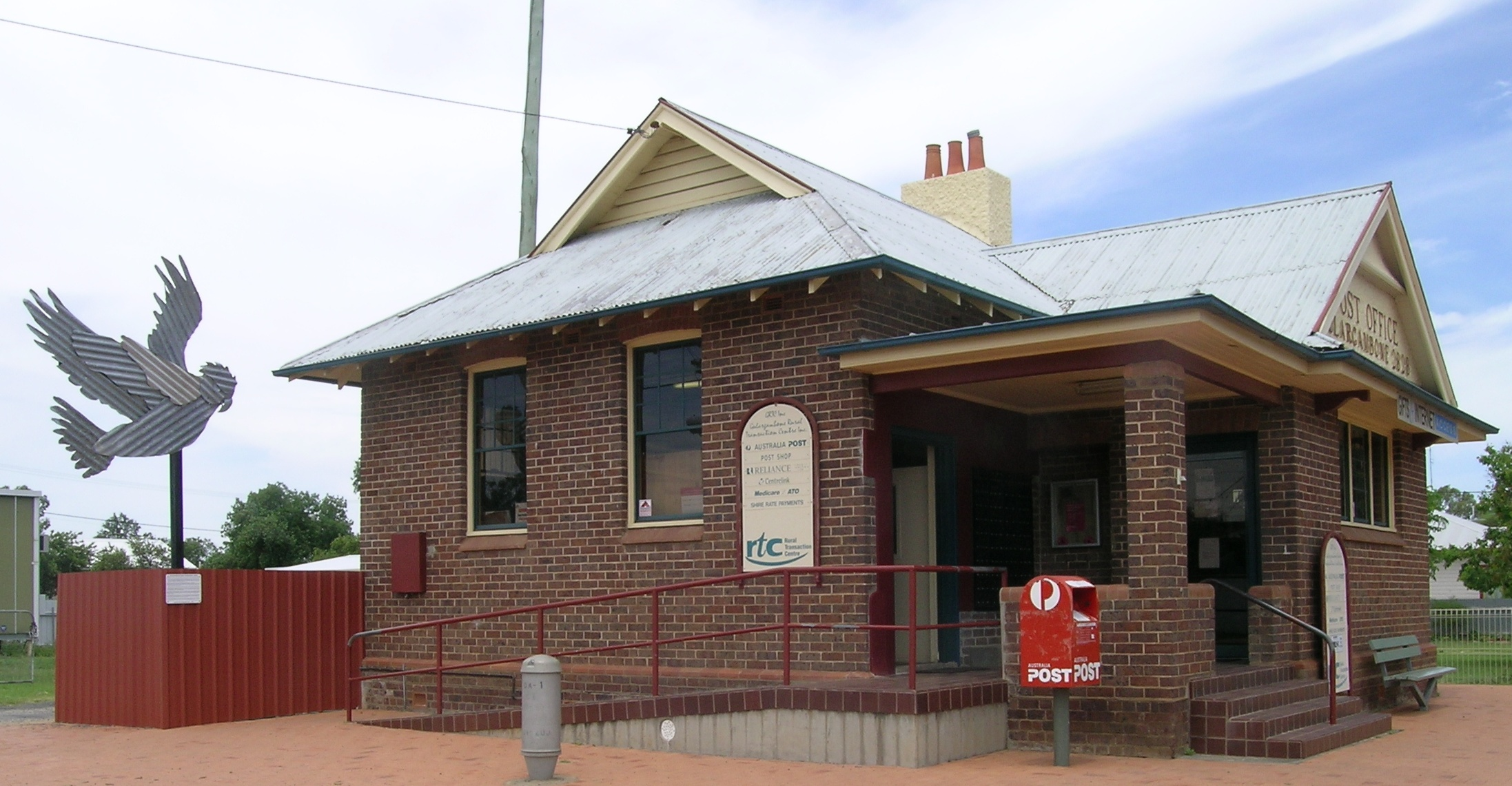
- One of the many sculptured galahs and the post office, Gulargambone

- Coordinates: 31°20′S 148°28′E
- Country: Australia
- State: New South Wales
- LGA: Coonamble Shire Council
- Location: 382 km (237 mi) NW of Sydney; 102 km (63 mi) N of Dubbo; 43 km (27 mi) S of Coonamble

Government
  - State electorate: Barwon
  - Federal division: Parkes

Population
  - Total: 400 (2016 census)
- Postcode: 2828
- County: Gowen

Gulargambone is a small town in the central-west plains of New South Wales, Australia, on the banks of the Castlereagh River, in Coonamble Shire. It is 382 km (and 490 km by road) north-west of Sydney. At the 2016 census, Gulargambone had a population of 400.

Its name is derived from the local Wiradjuri people's word for "Watering place of many birds" or Gillahgambone for "place of galahs". Gulargambone was first occupied by Europeans in the mid-19th century and gazetted as a village in 1883.

The town came to national attention in 2000, when the local government attempted to close down the post office, leading to the opening of the first community-owned post office in Australia, which has been followed by a number of other community-led initiatives. These include the improvement of the local hospital, creating a multi-purpose health centre, the opening of a new cinema and the transformation of the old cinema, Simmo's Bazaar, into 2828, the community centre, featuring a café and a gift shop. It has also adopted a town logo, the galah. This has led to Gulargambone becoming the model for self-sufficiency for other small towns in Australia. Gulargambone has won several awards since its revival and most importantly was awarded the 2005 NSW Tidy Towns State winner.

== Population ==
According to the 2016 census of population, 400 people were in Gulargambone.

- Aboriginal and Torres Strait Islander people made up 45.0% of the population.
- About 79.8% of people were born in Australia and 80.8% of people spoke only English at home.
- The most common responses for religion were Anglican 27.8% and no religion 26.8%.

== Transport ==
Driving by car from Sydney to Gulargambone is 490 km and takes about seven hours. Driving by car from Dubbo to Gulargambone is 114 km and takes roughly 1.25 hr.

NSW TrainLink operates coaches between Dubbo and Lightning Ridge, which stop at Coonamble Street, Gulargambone. The coach to Lightning Ridge stops daily at 15:45. The coach to Dubbo stops at 09:00 from Tuesday to Thursday, and 12:00 from Friday to Monday.

== Sport ==
Gulargambone has a rugby union club playing in the Western Plains Rugby Union competition called the Gulargambone Galahs. The town formerly had a rugby league club of the same name, who played in the Castlereagh League and made the 2004 Grand Final.

== Gallery ==
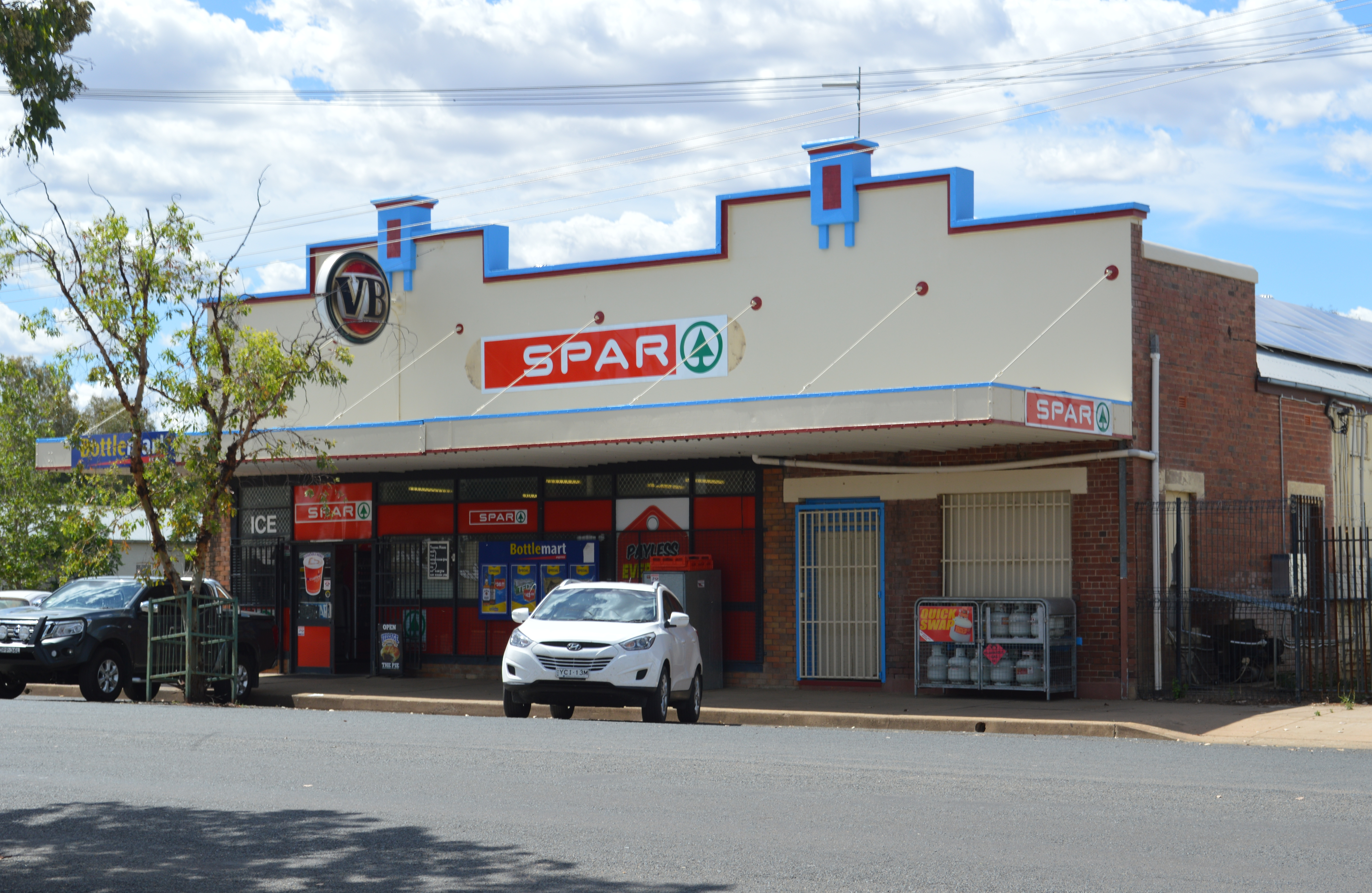
Gulargambone Spar Supermarket

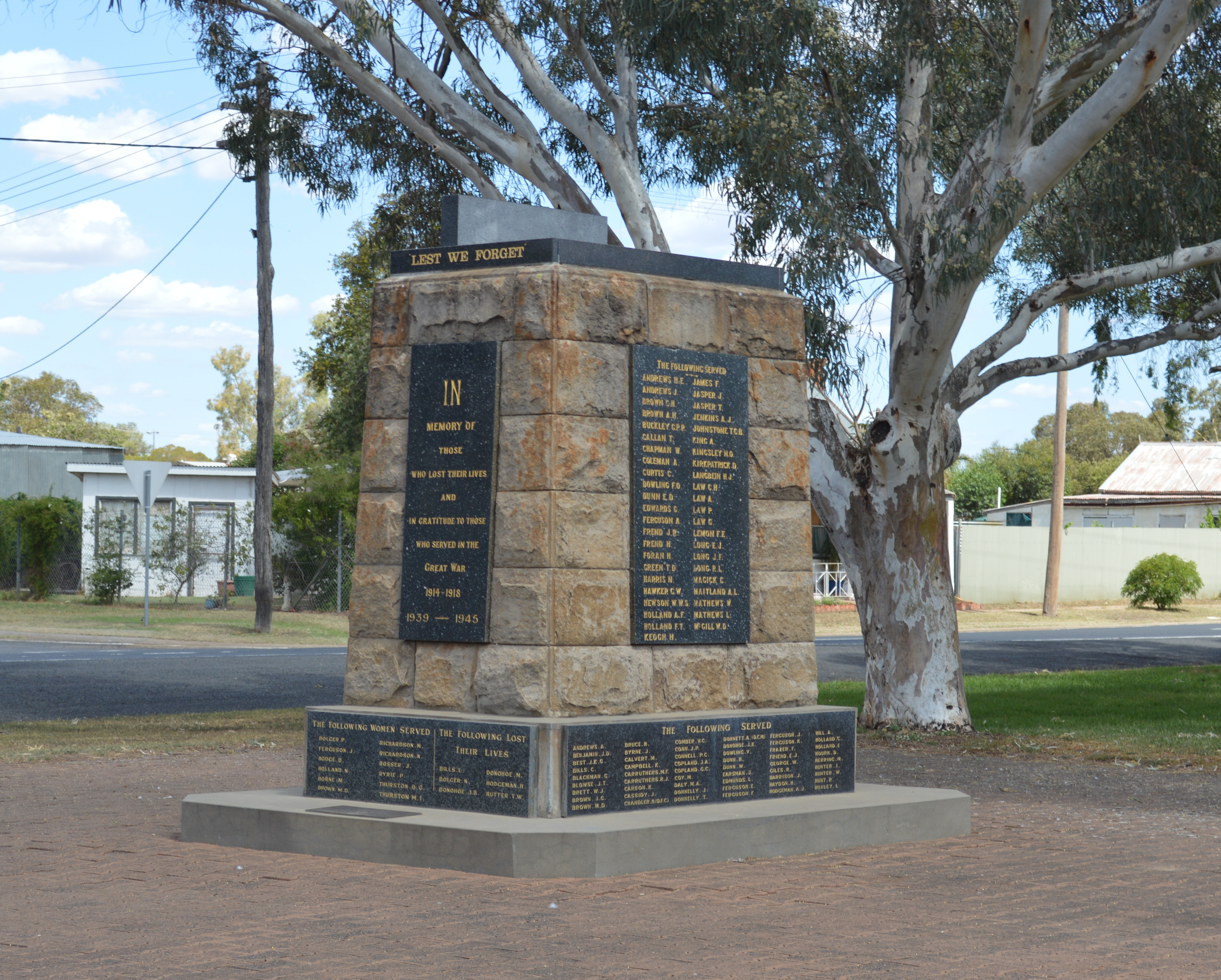
Gulargambone War Memorial

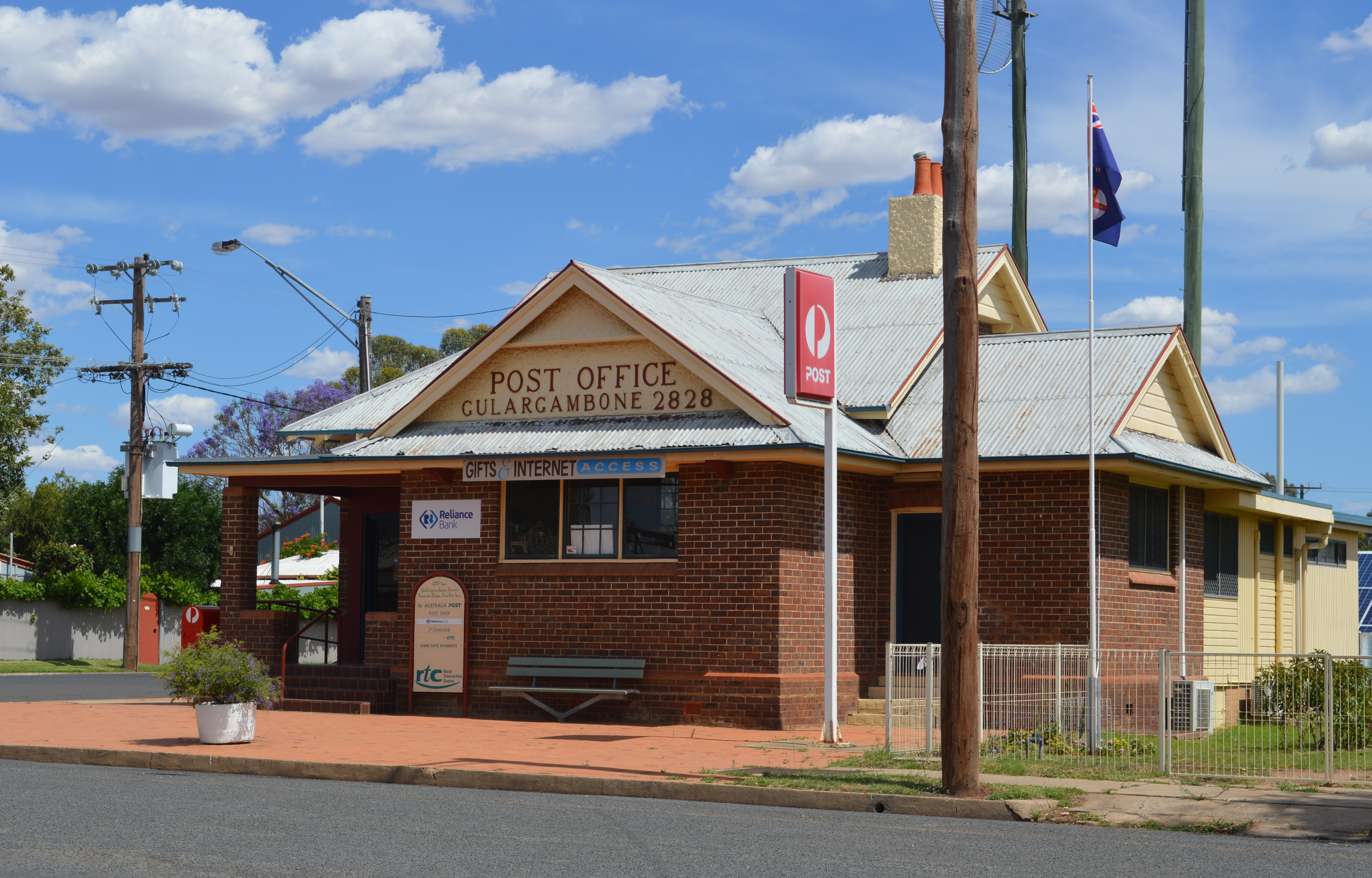
Gulargambone Post Office

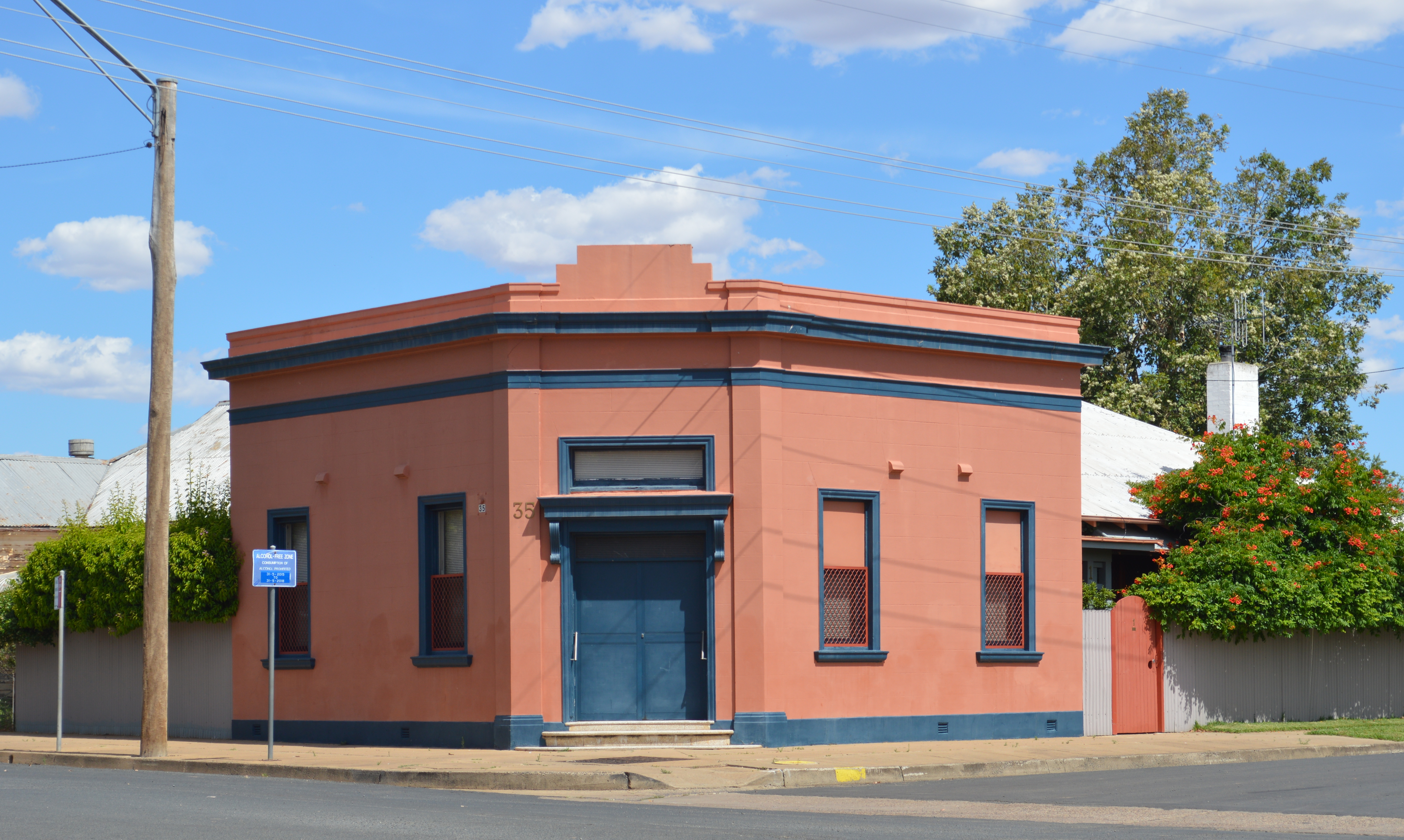
Gulargambone Bank of New South Wales Building

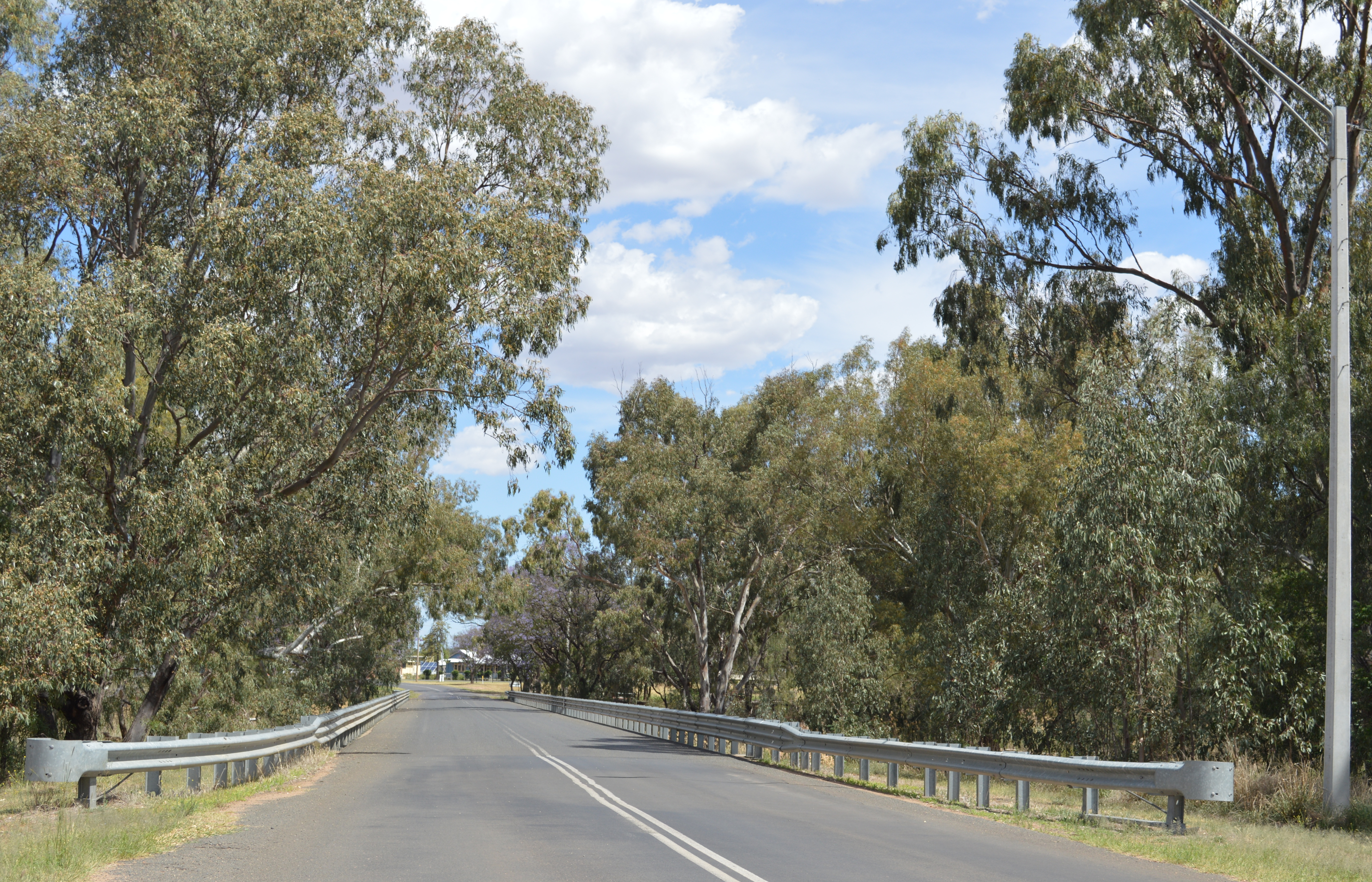
Gulargambone Castlereagh River Bridge

== Notable residents ==
- Peter Andren – independent parliamentarian
- Alexander Henry Buckley – First World War Victoria Cross recipient
- Harry Chandler – farmer at Gulargambone, pilot navigator with the RAAF stationed first in the Middle East, then Malta and finally in England and 1944 recipient of the Distinguished Flying Cross in WWII. Chandler was a crew member in a Lancaster on many tours out of England flown by RAAF pilot Frank Morris from the neighbouring town of Gilgandra, who was also a 1944 recipient of the Distinguished Flying Cross.
- Neil Lambell – grazier raised on "Weenya", Gulargambone, 1944 recipient of Distinguished Flying Cross in WWII
- Sam Irwin – current utility back for the rugby union club Uni-Norths Owls in the John I Dent Cup
- Alan Ridley – Australian Rugby League test player
