= Coonamble Shire =

- Local government area
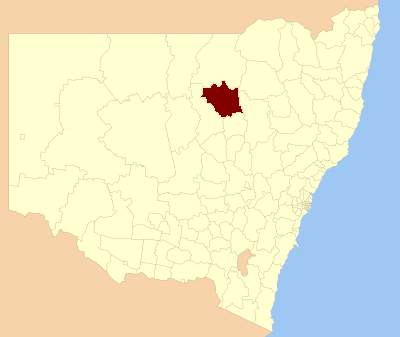
- Location in New South Wales

- Interactive map of Coonamble Shire
- Coordinates: 30°57′S 148°24′E
- Country: Australia
- State: New South Wales
- Region: Orana
- Established: 1 May 1952
- Council seat: Coonamble

Government
  - Mayor: Daniel Keady (Independent)
  - State electorate: Barwon
  - Federal division: Parkes

Area
  - Total: 9,926 km^{2} (3,832 sq mi)

Population
  - Total: 3,732 (2021 census)
  - Density: 0.37598/km^{2} (0.97379/sq mi)
- Website: Coonamble Shire
LGAs around Coonamble Shire
Brewarrina	Walgett	Narrabri
Warren	Coonamble Shire	Warrumbungle
Warren	Gilgandra	Warrumbungle

Coonamble Shire is a local government area in the Orana region of New South Wales, Australia. The Shire is located adjacent to the Castlereagh Highway and the Castlereagh River.

Coonamble Shire includes the towns of Coonamble, Gulargambone, and Quambone.

The mayor of Coonamble Shire Council is Daniel Keady.

== History ==
Local government in the area was first established with the Municipal District of Coonamble formed on 3 May 1880. Wingadee Shire was formed later, one of 134 shires proclaimed on 7 March 1906 following passing of the Local Government (Shires) Act 1905.

Coonamble Shire itself was formed on 1 May 1952 from the amalgamation of the Municipality of Coonamble with Wingadee Shire.

== Demographics ==
Selected historical census data for Coonamble Shire local government area
Census year		2011	2016	2021
Population	Estimated residents on census night	4,030	▼3,918	▼3,732
Population	LGA rank in terms of size within New South Wales	118th	▲116th	116th
Population	% of New South Wales population			
Population	% of Australian population			
Cultural and language diversity				
Ancestry, top responses	English			
Ancestry, top responses	Australian			
Ancestry, top responses	Italian			
Ancestry, top responses	Chinese			
Ancestry, top responses	Irish			
Language, top responses (other than English)	Italian			
Language, top responses (other than English)	Mandarin			
Language, top responses (other than English)	Cantonese			
Language, top responses (other than English)	Korean			
Language, top responses (other than English)	Greek			
Religious affiliation				
Religious affiliation, top responses	Catholic			
Religious affiliation, top responses	No religion			
Religious affiliation, top responses	Anglican			
Religious affiliation, top responses	Eastern Orthodox			
Religious affiliation, top responses	Buddhism			
Median weekly incomes				
Personal income	Median weekly personal income	A$		
Personal income	% of Australian median income			
Family income	Median weekly family income			
Family income	% of Australian median income			
Household income	Median weekly household income			
Household income	% of Australian median income			

== Council ==
=== Current composition and election method ===
Coonamble Shire Council is composed of nine councillors elected proportionally as a single ward. All councillors are elected for a fixed four-year term of office. The mayor is elected by the councillors at the first meeting of the council. The most recent election was held on 14 September 2024, and the makeup of the council is as follows:

Party	Councillors
Independents and Unaligned	9
Total	9

The current Council, elected in 2024, in order of election, is:

Councillor	Party	Notes
Daniel Keady	Independent	Mayor
Pip Goldsmith		
Paul Fisher	Independent	
Ahmad (Al) Karanouh		
Paul Wheelhouse	Independent	
Adam Cohen	Independent	
Karen Churchill	Independent	
Steve Butler	Independent	Deputy Mayor
Margaret Garnsey	Independent	

== Election results ==
=== 2024 ===
2024 New South Wales local elections: Coonamble
Party	Candidate	Votes	%	±%
Independent	Daniel Keady (elected)	330	16.2	+16.2
Independent	Pip Goldsmith (elected)	247	12.1	+12.1
Independent	Paul Fisher (elected)	227	11.1	+11.1
Independent	Ahmad (Al) Karanouh (elected)	205	10.1	−2.6
Independent	Paul Wheelhouse (elected)	186	9.1	+9.1
Independent	Adam Cohen (elected)	175	8.6	+0.3
Independent	Karen Churchill (elected)	156	7.7	−1.1
Independent	Steve Butler (elected)	156	7.7	+7.7
Independent	Margaret Garnsey (elected)	106	5.2	+5.2
Independent	Steven Smith	82	4.0	−5.1
Independent	Donna Norris	44	2.2	+2.2
Independent	Neil Fester	43	2.1	+2.1
Independent	William Landers	41	2.0	+2.0
Independent	Barbara Deans	30	1.5	−4.6
Independent	Melissa Skuthorp	11	0.5	+0.5
Total formal votes		2,039	95.2	
Informal votes		102	4.8	
Turnout		2,141	75.9	

== See also ==
- List of local government areas in New South Wales
