= Tooraweenah =

- Town
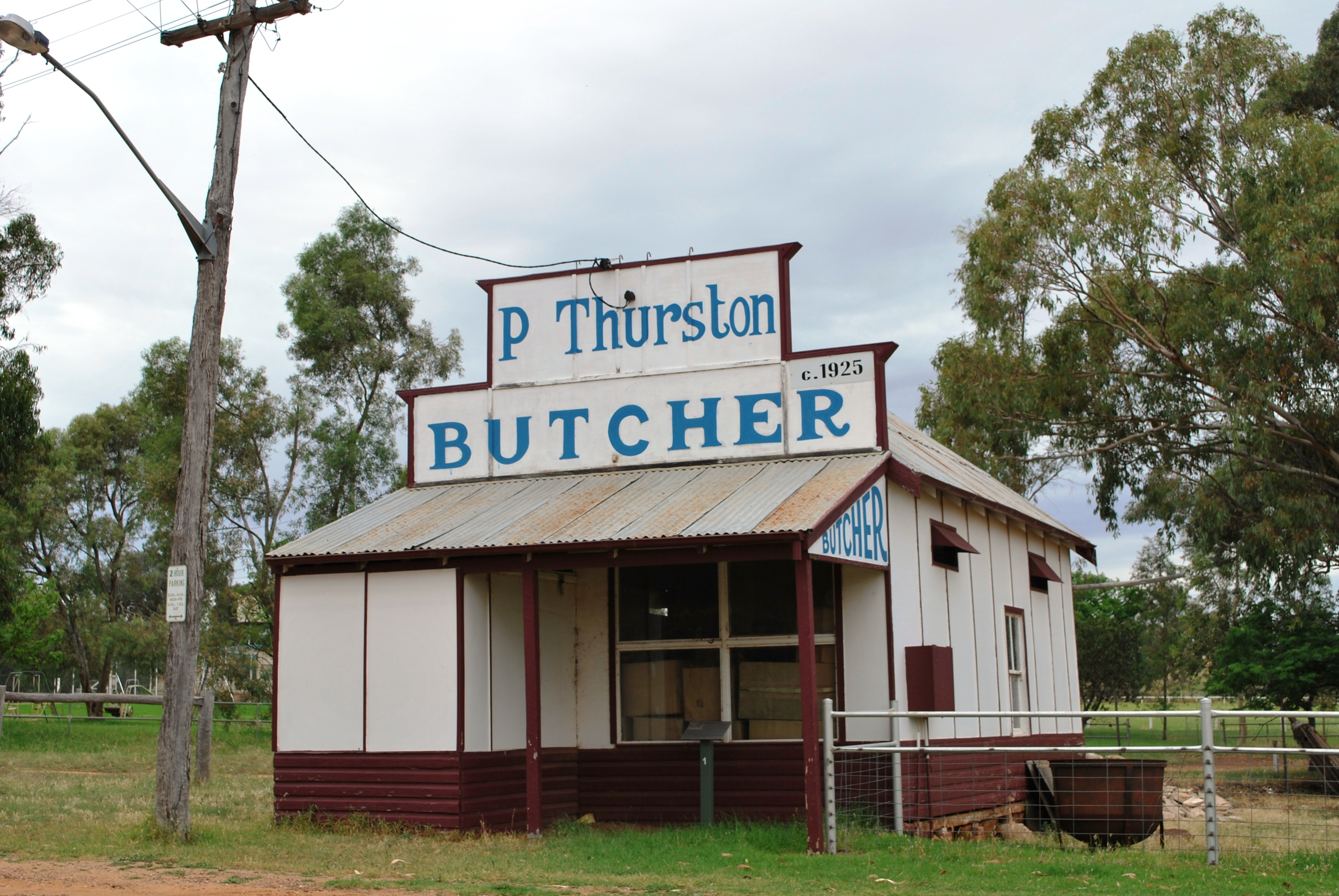
- Historic butcher shop

- Coordinates: 31°26′20″S 148°54′40″E
- Country: Australia
- State: New South Wales
- LGA: Gilgandra Shire
- Location: 486 km (302 mi) NW of Sydney; 108 km (67 mi) N of Dubbo; 43 km (27 mi) NE of Gilgandra

Government
  - State electorate: Barwon
  - Federal division: Parkes

Population
  - Total: 253 (2021 census)
- Postcode: 2817

Tooraweenah is a small village just off the Newell Highway about 44 km (27 mi) northeast of Gilgandra in the central west of New South Wales, Australia. At the 2021 census, Tooraweenah had a population of 253.

The land surrounding Tooraweenah is used for sheep, cattle, goat and emu grazing. There is broadscale grain cropping as well.

Tooraweenah is often the last stop for tourists on their way from Gilgandra to the Warrumbungle National Park.

== Services ==
- caravan park
- pub
- post office
- hardware and agricultural supply store
- community technology centre
- automotive repair and fuelling
- aerodrome

== Clubs ==
- tennis club,
- Lions Club,
- agricultural show society.
- Biddon-Tooraweenah Cricket Club

ABC Shield Premiers 2004/05, 2005/06, 2007/08, 2012/13, 2014/15, 2015/16, 2016/17, 2018/19

== Telecommunications ==
- a Telstra Remote Integrated Multiplexor (RIM) provides PSTN telephony and ISDN, and ADSL,
- ABC broadcast FM radio transponders at nearby Needle Mountain (including 105.5 MHz Classic FM, 106.3 MHz News Radio, 107.1 MHz Local Radio, and 107.9 MHz Radio National),
- a UHF CB repeater on Channel 1,
- an amateur radio repeater on 146.8 MHz.
