= Warrumbungle Shire =

- Local government area
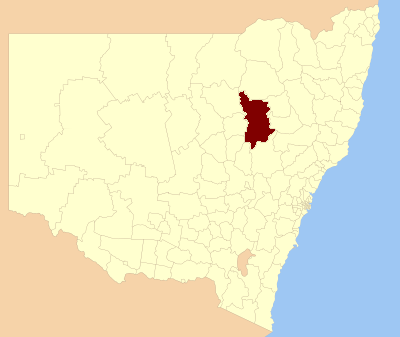
- Location in New South Wales

- Interactive map of Warrumbungle Shire
- Coordinates: 31°15′S 149°16′E
- Country: Australia
- State: New South Wales
- Region: Orana
- Established: 2004
- Council seat: Coonabarabran

Government
  - Mayor: Denis Todd (Unaligned)
  - State electorate: Barwon
  - Federal division: Parkes

Area
  - Total: 12,380 km^{2} (4,780 sq mi)

Population
  - Totals: 9,384 (2016 census); 9,399 (2018 est.)
  - Density: 0.7580/km^{2} (1.9632/sq mi)
- Website: Warrumbungle Shire
LGAs around Warrumbungle Shire
| Coonamble | Narrabri | Gunnedah & Tamworth |
| Gilgandra | Warrumbungle Shire | Liverpool Plains |
| Dubbo | Dubbo | Upper Hunter |

The Warrumbungle Shire is a local government area in the central western region of New South Wales, Australia. The Shire is traversed by the Newell Highway. The Warrumbungle mountain range and Warrumbungles National Park are major tourist attractions for the Shire. Its seat is located in Coonabarabran, a town in the southwest.

The mayor of Warrumbungle Shire Council is Kathryn Rindfleish, who is unaligned with any political party.

The Warrumbungle Shire local government area sits on Gamilaraay land to the north-east, Wiradjuri land to the south, and Weilwan land to the west.

== Main towns and villages ==
The Shire incorporates the towns of Binnaway, Coolah, Coonabarabran, Dunedoo, Baradine and Mendooran.

== Heritage listings ==
The Warrumbungle Shire has a number of heritage-listed sites, including:

- Coolah, 74 Binnia Street: Old Police Station and Courthouse
- Coonabarabran, Oxley Highway: Burra Bee Dee Mission
- Dunedoo, Wallerawang-Gwabegar railway: Dunedoo railway station
- Kenebri, Old Wooleybah Road: Wooleybah Sawmill and Settlement

== Demographics ==
Selected historical census data for Warrumbungle Shire local government area
| Census year | | 2011 | 2016 | 2021 |
|---|---|---|---|---|
| Population | Estimated residents on census night | 9,588 | ▼9,384 | ▼9,225 |
| Population | LGA rank in terms of size within New South Wales | 93rd | ▲92nd | ▼94th |
| Population | % of New South Wales population | 0.14% | ▼0.13% | ▼0.11% |
| Population | % of Australian population | 0.04% | 0.04% | 0.04% |
| Cultural and language diversity | | | | |
| Ancestry, top responses | English | | 30.8% | ▲40.6% |
| Ancestry, top responses | Australian | | 36.3% | ▲41.6% |
| Ancestry, top responses | Scottish | | 7.7% | ▲9.1% |
| Ancestry, top responses | Irish | | 7.6% | ▲9.9% |
| Ancestry, top responses | Australian Aboriginal | | | ▲9.8% |
| Language, top responses (other than English) | German | 0.3% | 0.3% | ▼0.2% |
| Language, top responses (other than English) | Filipino | n/c | n/c | ▲0.2% |
| Language, top responses (other than English) | Tagalog | n/c | n/c | ▲0.2% |
| Language, top responses (other than English) | Italian | n/c | ▲0.1% | 0.1% |
| Language, top responses (other than English) | Malayalam | n/c | ▲0.1% | 0.1% |
| Religious affiliation | | | | |
| Religious affiliation, top responses | No religion | 14.4% | ▲20.6% | ▲26.2% |
| Religious affiliation, top responses | Anglican | 36.3% | ▼30.7% | ▼25.6% |
| Religious affiliation, top responses | Catholic | 23.7% | ▼21.8% | ▼20.5% |
| Religious affiliation, top responses | Presbyterian and Reformed | 6.0% | ▼5.5% | ▼4.5% |
| Median weekly incomes | | | | |
| Personal income | Median weekly personal income | $380 | $479 | $559 |
| Personal income | % of Australian median income | 65.9% | ▲72.4% | ▼69.4% |
| Family income | Median weekly family income | $869 | $1,103 | $1,387 |
| Family income | % of Australian median income | 58.7% | ▲63.6% | ▲65.4% |
| Household income | Median weekly household income | $689 | $878 | $1,068 |
| Household income | % of Australian median income | 55.8% | ▲61.1% | ▲61.2% |

== Council ==
The Shire was created in 2004 by the amalgamation of Coolah and Coonabarabran Shire councils. Following amalgamation, the Shire was run by an administrator, until elections were held in March 2005.

=== Current composition and election method ===
Warrumbungle Shire Council is composed of nine councillors elected proportionally as a single ward. All councillors are elected for a fixed four-year term of office. The most recent election was held in 2021, and the makeup of the council is as follows:

The current Council, elected in 2021, is:

| Councillor | Party | Notes |
|---|---|---|
| Kathryn Rindfleish | Unaligned | |
| Jason Newton | Unaligned | |
| Zoe Holcombe | Unaligned | |
| Ray Lewis | Unaligned | |
| Debra Bell | Unaligned | |
| Dale Hogden | Unaligned | |
| Kodi Brady | Unaligned | |
| Denis Todd | Unaligned | |
| Naomi Taylor | Unaligned | |

The mayor is elected by the councillors every two years. At the last mayoral election held 21 September 2023, Cr Rindfleish was elected as mayor and Cr Newton elected as deputy mayor.

== Election results ==
=== 2024 ===
2024 New South Wales local elections: Warrumbungle
| Party | Candidate | Votes | % | ±% |
|---|---|---|---|---|
| Independent | Zoe Holcombe (elected) | unopposed | | |
| Independent | Ray Lewis (elected) | unopposed | | |
| Independent | Debra Ball (elected) | unopposed | | |
| Independent | Kathryn Rindfleish (elected) | unopposed | | |
| Independent | Dale Hogden (elected) | unopposed | | |
| Independent | Kodi Brady (elected) | unopposed | | |
| Independent | Denis Todd (elected) | unopposed | | |
| Independent | Naomi Taylor (elected) | unopposed | | |
| Independent | Jason Newton (elected) | unopposed | | |
| Registered electors | | | | |

== See also ==
- List of local government areas in New South Wales
