= Wayilwan =

Aboriginal Australian people of New South Wales

The Wayilwan (also rendered Weilwan or Wailwan; also known as Ngiyambaa Wayilwan and Ngemba Wayilwan) are an Aboriginal Australian people of the state of New South Wales. They are a clan of the Ngiyambaa (nee-yam-bar) nation.

== Name ==
The Wayilwan ethnonym is derived from their word for "no" in the Ngiyambaa language, (wayil/weil/wail).

Like other Ngiyampaa people such as the Wangaaypuwan, they also referred to themselves according to their home country.

== Language ==
The Wayilwan spoke the dialect of Ngiyambaa called "Ngiyambaa Wayilwan" and as such also called themselves "those who speak Ngiyampaa the Wayilwan way".

== Country ==
Wayilwan country covered 5,000 square miles (13,000 km^{2}), running along the southern bank of the Barwon River from Brewarrina to Walgett, and along Marra Creek and the Castlereagh, Marthaguy, and Macquarie rivers. Their southern frontier was at Quambone and in the vicinity of Coonamble.

== Social organisation ==
The Wayilwan were divided into kin groups, one of which is known: the Waiabara.

== Alternative names ==
- Ngemba (name of their language)
- Ngemba (name of their language)
- Ngiumba (name of their language)
- Ngiyambaa (name of their language)
- Ngiyambaa Wayilwan (those who speak Ngiyambaa the Wayilwan way)
- Waal-won
- Wahoon (misprint)
- Wailwan
- Wailwun
- Wali
- Waljwan
- Wallwan
- Weilwan
- Weilwun
- Wilawun
- Wile Wan
- Wilwan

== Sources ==
- Honery, Thomas (1878). "Wailwun Language and Traditions". Journal of the Anthropological Institute of Great Britain and Ireland. 7: 245–254. JSTOR 2841001.
- Tindale, Norman Barnett (1974). "Koamu (QLD)". Aboriginal Tribes of Australia: Their Terrain, Environmental Controls, Distribution, Limits, and Proper Names. Australian National University. ISBN 978-0-708-10741-6. Archived from the original on 3 July 2017.
