= Gilgandra Shire =

- Local government area
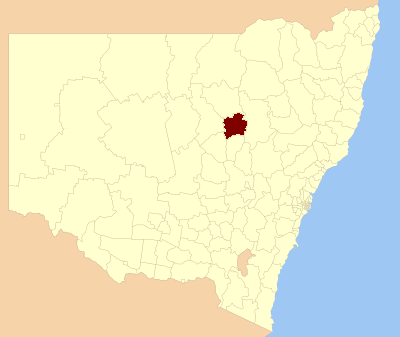
- Location in New South Wales

- Interactive map of Gilgandra Shire
- Coordinates: 31°42′S 148°41′E
- Country: Australia
- State: New South Wales
- Region: Orana
- Established: 1906
- Council seat: Gilgandra

Government
  - Mayor: Doug Batten (Independent)
  - State electorate: Barwon
  - Federal division: Parkes

Area
  - Total: 4,836 km^{2} (1,867 sq mi)

Population
  - Totals: 4,236 (2016 census); 4,226 (2018 est.)
  - Density: 0.87593/km^{2} (2.2686/sq mi)
- Website: Gilgandra Shire
LGAs around Gilgandra Shire
Warren	Coonamble	Warrumbungle
Warren	Gilgandra Shire	Warrumbungle
Narromine	Dubbo	Warrumbungle

Gilgandra Shire is a local government area in the Orana region of New South Wales, Australia. The Shire is located adjacent to the junction of the Newell, Oxley and Castlereagh highways and can be reached in about six hours by car from Sydney CBD. The Shire lies on the Castlereagh River and includes part of the Warrumbungles National Park. The shire was constituted in 1906.

The mayor of Gilgandra Shire Council is Doug Batten, an independent politician.

== Settlements and geography ==
Gilgandra Shire includes Gilgandra, Balladoran and Curban.

The geography of the Gilgandra Shire is very flat. The soil is composed mostly of sand, making it very porous and difficult to grow certain plants. The weather is hot and dry, reaching 40 °C (104 °F) for consecutive days during summer.

== Demographics ==
Selected historical census data for Gilgandra Shire local government area
Census year		2011	2016
Population	Estimated residents on census night	4,386	▼4,236
Population	LGA rank in terms of size within New South Wales	115th	115th
Population	% of New South Wales population		
Population	% of Australian population		
Cultural and language diversity			
Ancestry, top responses	English		
Ancestry, top responses	Australian		
Ancestry, top responses	Italian		
Ancestry, top responses	Chinese		
Ancestry, top responses	Irish		
Language, top responses (other than English)	Italian		
Language, top responses (other than English)	Mandarin		
Language, top responses (other than English)	Cantonese		
Language, top responses (other than English)	Korean		
Language, top responses (other than English)	Greek		
Religious affiliation			
Religious affiliation, top responses	Catholic		
Religious affiliation, top responses	No religion		
Religious affiliation, top responses	Anglican		
Religious affiliation, top responses	Eastern Orthodox		
Religious affiliation, top responses	Buddhism		
Median weekly incomes			
Personal income	Median weekly personal income	A$	
Personal income	% of Australian median income		
Family income	Median weekly family income		
Family income	% of Australian median income		
Household income	Median weekly household income		
Household income	% of Australian median income		

== Heritage listings ==
Gilgandra Shire has a number of heritage-listed sites, including:

- East Coonamble Road, Curban: Corduroy Road Ruin Historic Site
- Myrtle Street, Gilgandra: St Ambrose Church

== Council ==
=== Current composition and election method ===
Gilgandra Shire Council is composed of nine councillors elected proportionally as a single ward. All councillors are elected for a fixed four-year term of office. The mayor is elected by the councillors at the first meeting of the council. The most recent election was held on 4 December 2021.

Party	Councillors
Independents	9
Total	9

== Election results ==
=== 2024 ===
2024 New South Wales local elections: Gilgandra
Party	Candidate	Votes	%	±%
Independent National	Ashley Walker (elected 1)	376	15.4	+2.2
Independent	Madeline Foran (elected 2)	315	12.9	+12.9
Independent	Ian Freeth (elected 3)	298	12.2	+1.7
Independent	Paul Mann (elected 4)	288	11.8	−1.7
Independent	Doug Batten (elected 5)	249	10.2	−0.3
Independent	Nicholas White (elected 6)	222	9.1	+2.8
Independent National	Greg Peart (elected 7)	176	7.2	+0.8
Independent	Gail Babbage	174	7.1	−2.4
Independent	Brian Mockler (elected 9)	173	7.1	−0.4
Independent	Amber Bunter (elected 8)	163	6.7	−1.0
Total formal votes		2,434	95.5	−2.0
Informal votes		114	4.5	+2.0
Turnout		2,548	79.5	−1.1

=== 2021 ===
2021 New South Wales local elections: Gilgandra
Party	Candidate	Votes	%	±%
Independent	Paul Mann (elected)	337	13.5	
Independent National	Ashley Walker (elected)	328	13.2	
Independent	Ian Freeth (elected)	263	10.6	
Independent	Doug Batten (elected)	262	10.5	
Independent	Gail Babbage (elected)	238	9.6	
Independent	Noel Mudford (elected)	206	8.3	
Independent	Amber Bunter (elected)	193	7.7	
Independent	Brian Mockler (elected)	188	7.5	
Independent National	Greg Peart (elected)	160	6.4	
Independent	Helen Naef	160	6.4	
Independent	Nicholas White	157	6.3	
Total formal votes		2,492	97.6	
Informal votes		60	2.4	
Turnout		2,552	80.6	
