= Renewable Energy Zones =

Australian renewable energy scheme

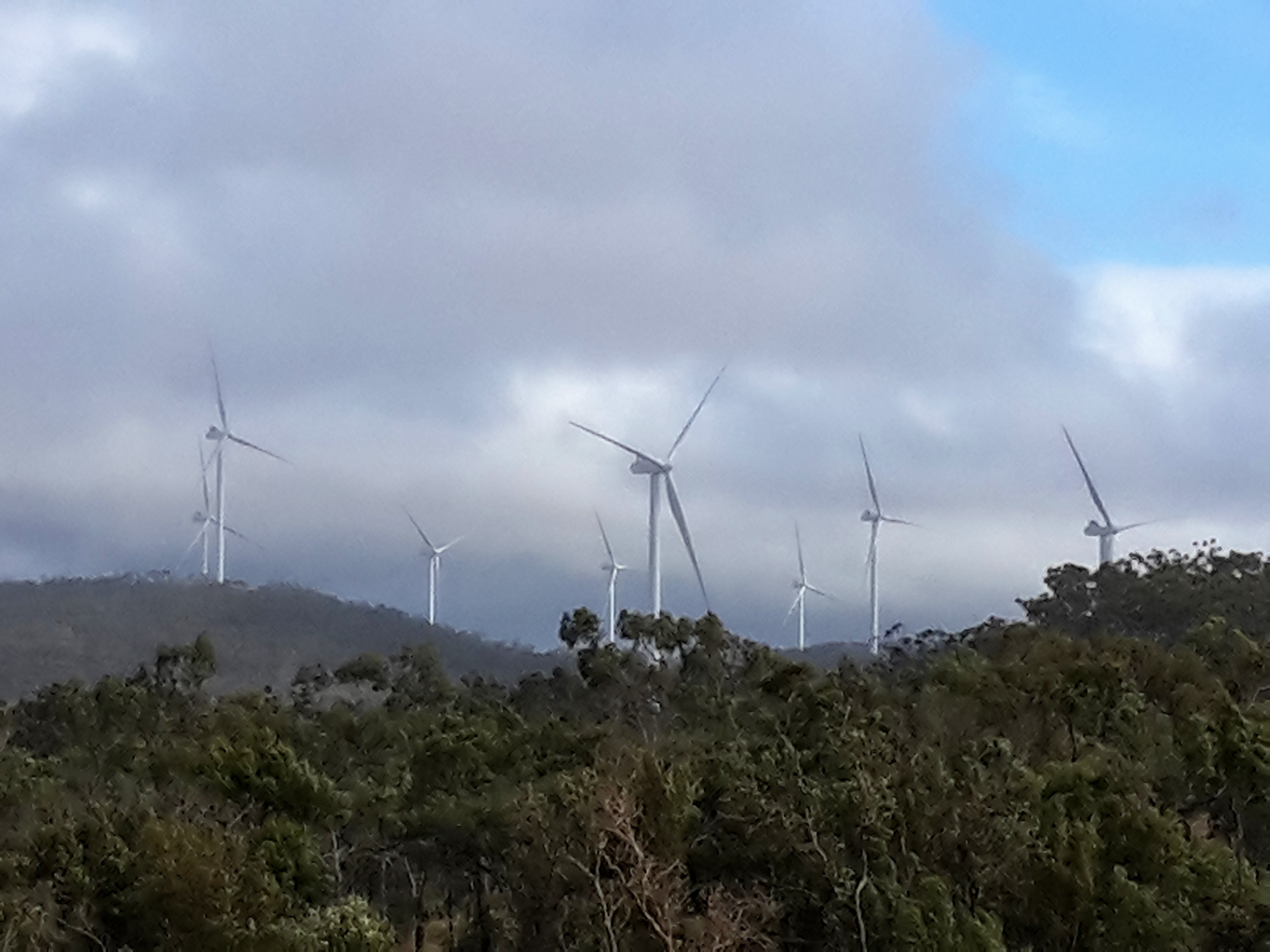
Wind farm in Mount Emerald, Far North Queensland. The Mount Emerald Wind Farm sits within the proposed Far North Queensland REZ.

Renewable Energy Zones (REZs) are areas designated by the Australian government for large-scale deployment of renewable energy infrastructure. The goal of REZs is to co-locate renewable energy infrastructure and investment within Australia's National Electricity Market (NEM), reducing the overall costs of electricity generation and transmission. The New South Wales government describes REZs as "the equivalent of modern-day power stations", combining generators, storage, and high-voltage transmission.

As of 2025, there are five announced renewable energy zones in New South Wales, six in Victoria, one in Tasmania, and twelve planned in Queensland. The Australian Energy Market Operator shortlisted a total of 43 potential REZs in its 2024 Integrated System Plan. Most renewable energy zones have been designed to host one or more types of renewable energy infrastructure, such as solar farms, wind farms, battery storage, or pumped hydropower. One of the primary goals of REZs is to coordinate the development of transmission infrastructure, taking advantage of the existing infrastructure associated with fossil fuel plants scheduled for decommission. The Australian Electricity Market Operator projects that Australia will need an additional 10,000km of transmission lines in order to support the transition to renewable energy.

Renewable energy zones have been controversial in many areas of regional Australia, with concerns ranging from a loss of agricultural land to fears of overdevelopment and damage to natural landscapes. Some Indigenous communities have opposed the use of their traditional lands for renewable energy infrastructure development. Developers and governments have attempted to assuage these concerns by offering payments to land owners and communities impacted by renewable energy projects.

== History ==
Following a restructuring of the Australian electricity market in the 1990s, transmission utilities began to play a responsive role to the introduction of new generation capacity. Australia's NEM adopted an 'open access' model that allowed electricity generators to negotiate access to any part of the network at any time. However, an influx of variable renewable energy starting in the 2010s placed pressure on Australia's electricity grid. Over 16,000 megawatts of renewable energy entered the NEM between 2016 and 2021, stretching network hosting capacity and degrading system strength. This led to generation curtailment and connection lags.

Renewable energy zones have long been discussed as a potential solution to the problem of network congestion. Locational coordination has been identified as a way to address the stress placed on network hosting capacity by an uncoordinated influx of renewable energy. The first major renewable energy zone was established in the Electric Reliability Council of Texas in the early 2000s. Additional efforts at coordinating renewable energy development in zones have taken shape in places that include North America, India, South Africa and the Philippines.

The term 'renewable energy zone' was first used in the Australian context in Queensland in 2016 to describe a set of policies to build up transmission and generation infrastructure in Far North Queensland. An integrated plan for renewable energy zones was recommended in the 2017 Independent Review into the Future Security of the National Electricity Market. In its 2018 Integrated System Plan, the Australian Energy Market Operator responded to this recommendation by assessing 34 candidate REZs and argued that REZs would "provide an effective, least-cost way to integrate new generation, storage, and transmission development". Renewable energy zones were also recommended in the 2019 Australian Infrastructure Audit, which argued that coordinating investment in REZs would lead to lower wholesale and network costs for users over time. The Australian Energy Market Commission released an initial discussion paper on the regulatory framework for renewable energy zones in October 2019.

In its most recent 2024 Integrated System Plan, the AEMO shortlisted 43 potential REZs. As of January 2025, New South Wales has announced five renewable energy zones, Victoria has announced six, Queensland has announced twelve, and Tasmania has announced one. While REZs are managed at the state level, several REZs are adjacent to one of the federal government's six announced offshore wind zones.

== Locations ==
=== New South Wales ===
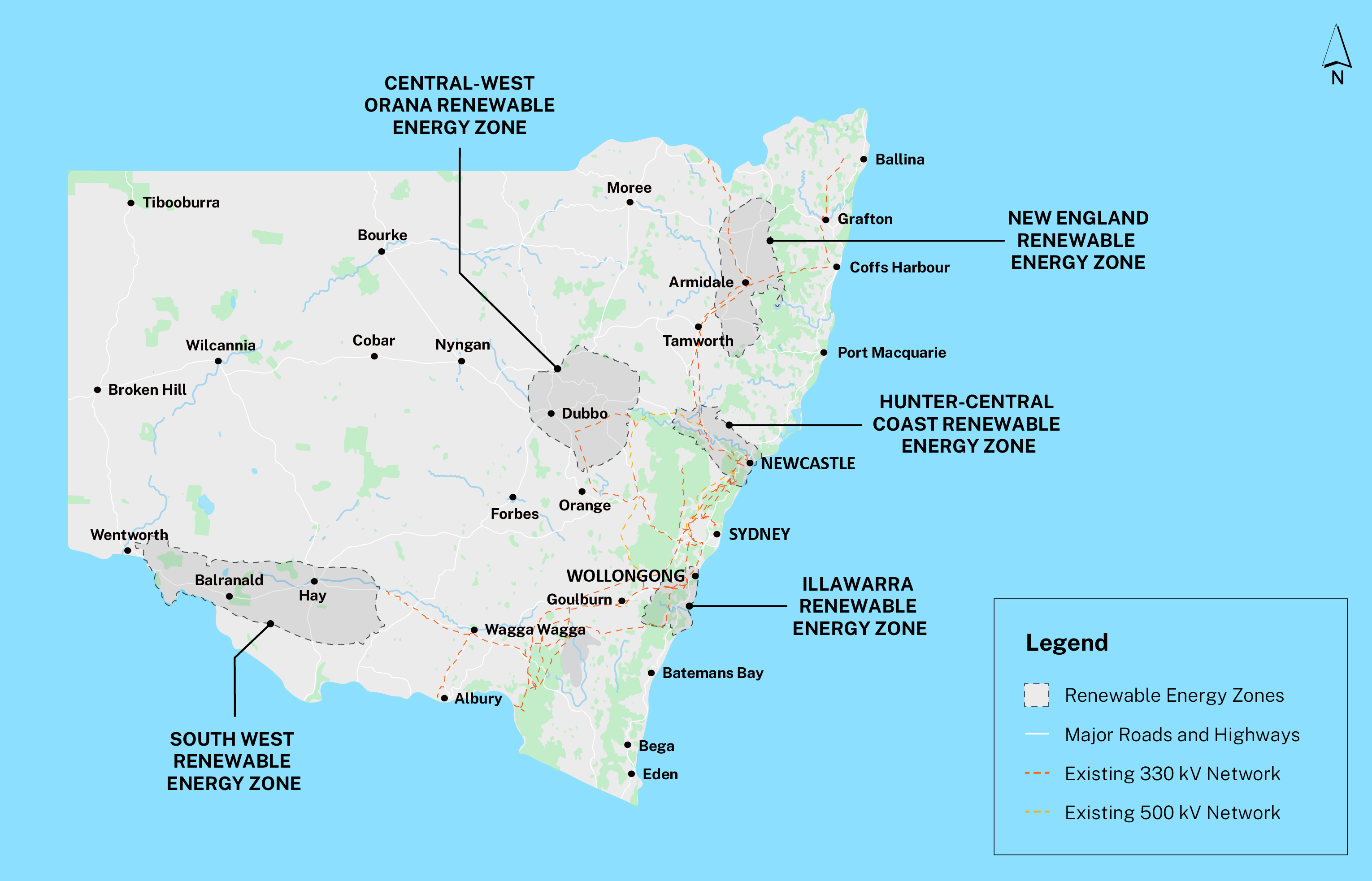
Map of REZs in New South Wales

As of 2025, New South Wales has announced five renewable energy zones: the Illawarra, Hunter-Central Coast, South-West, Central-West Orana and New England REZs. In June 2024 the Central-West Orana REZ, located in the region surrounding Dubbo, became the first REZ to win planning approval. The New South Wales Energy Infrastructure Roadmap, published in 2020, aims to add 12 gigawatts of renewable energy generation and 2 gigawatts of long-duration storage to the state's energy grid by 2030. The plan is expected to cost $32 billion by 2030.

In New South Wales, landowners in REZs are paid for hosting infrastructure, such as wind turbines and transmission lines, on their land. Landowners are expected to receive a total of $1.5 billion in lease payments by 2042. NSW offers land owners $200,000 over 20 years for each kilometre of transmission line they host, and more than $40,000 per wind turbine and $1500 per hectare of solar farm. In 2023, the New South Wales government announced an 'access fee' scheme that would charge renewable energy developers a minimum of $1700 per megawatt per year to be invested in community funds designated for health, housing, infrastructure, education and other projects in REZs.

==== Central-West Orana REZ ====
The Central-West Orana REZ is located in the Orana region of north-central New South Wales surrounding the town of Dubbo. In June 2024, the Central-West Orana REZ became the first REZ in Australia to win planning approval. Construction began in late 2024 and the REZ is expected to be operational by 2028. The REZ is expected to add 4.5 gigawatts of network capacity by 2028, with an intended total capacity of 6 gigawatts, and will bring $20 billion of investment and 5000 jobs to the region at its construction peak. The project involves 90 kms of 500 kV transmission lines and 150 kms of 330 kV transmission lines, connecting generators in the REZ to existing load centres in Sydney, Newcastle and Wollongong. The project will also involve the construction of energy hubs at Merotherie and Elong Elong, and a new switching station at Wollar. In 2025, AceRez ordered 7 synchronous condensers (syncon), 250 MVAR each, to supply grid stability for the zone.

The Central-West Orana REZ was strongly opposed by some members of the community. Of 398 submissions to the planning authority, 369 were objections and just 3 expressed support. Some objectors are from other states. Landowners have expressed concerns about the impact of new transmission lines on their properties, with some complaining that they were forced to negotiate "with a gun to their heads" due to the threat of compulsory acquisition. However, by June 2024, 97% of landowners had signed in-principle agreements to have their land acquired for the construction of transmission lines.

==== New England REZ ====
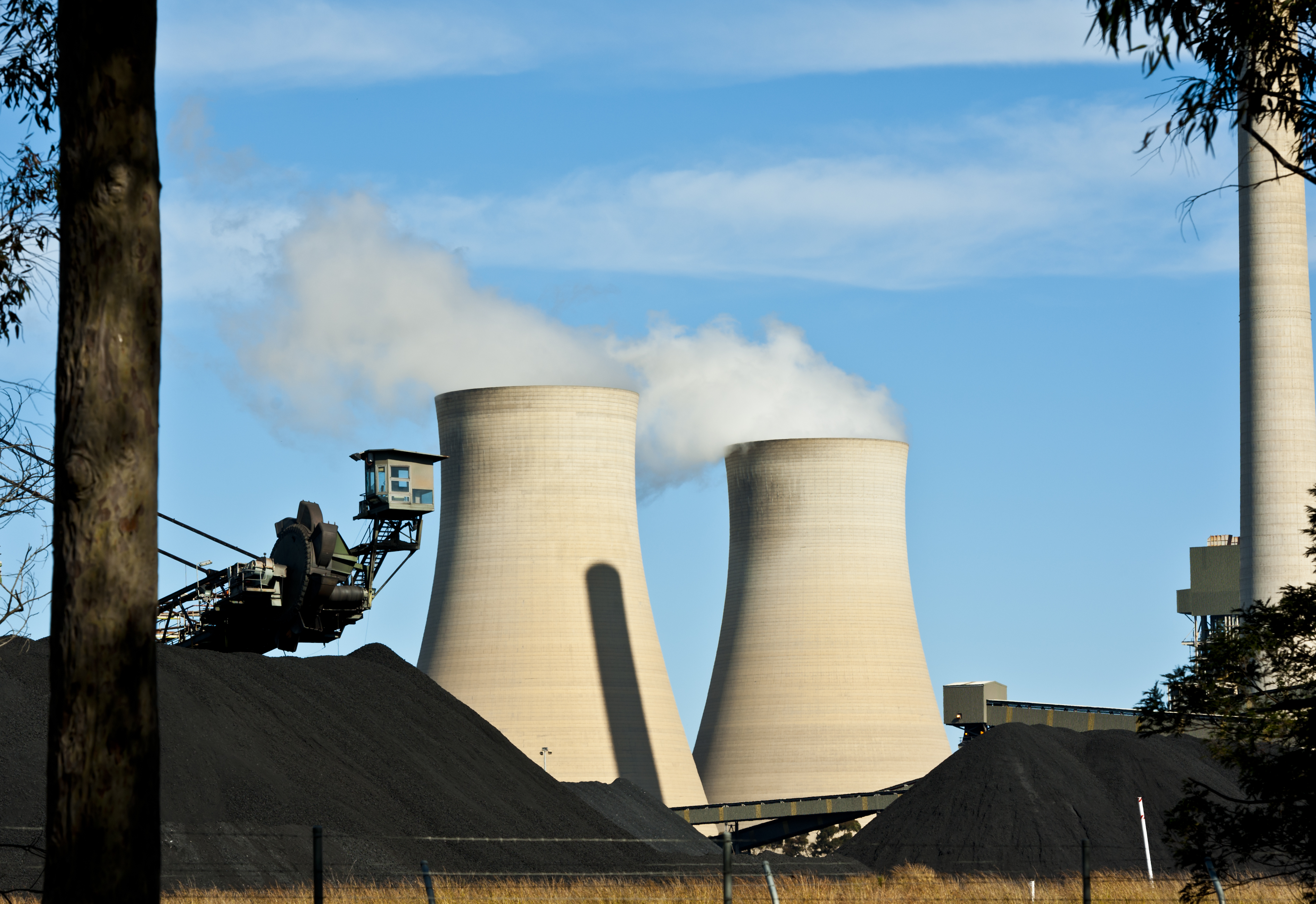
The New England REZ will involve the construction of a high-voltage transmission line to Bayswater Power Station, which is scheduled for decommission by 2033

The New England REZ is located in the Northern Tablelands region of New South Wales, centered on the town of Armidale. The REZ is expected to contribute 6 gigawatts of network capacity by 2033, and up to 8 gigawatts in total. The project will involve the construction of four energy hubs to bring together power from wind farms, solar farms and batteries across the REZ, and a transmission corridor to the existing power station at Bayswater. According to the New South Wales government's EnergyCo, the REZ is expected to deliver $10.7 billion in private sector investment and 2000 jobs in the region. A 1 GW battery is proposed for the REZ.

The project has been opposed by local state MP Brendan Moylan and federal MP Barnaby Joyce, both members of the National Party. The REZ has been controversial in the region, with some farmers expressing fears of lost land value and complaining of a lack of consultation. Ark Energy plans for a Doughboy Mountain Wind Farm near Armidale were scrapped in July 2024 after 9 land owners changed their minds about hosting wind turbines on their properties.

==== Hunter-Central Coast REZ ====
The Hunter-Central Coast REZ is located in the Hunter Region and encompasses Newcastle and its surrounds. The REZ is adjacent to the Commonwealth's Hunter offshore wind zone. The REZ is expected to add 1 gigawatt of network capacity and will take advantage of infrastructure associated with the region's historical role as a coal mining and electricity generation hub. A 2022 expression of interest process saw 40 gigawatts and more than $100 billion of interest, including 24 solar projects, 13 onshore and 7 offshore wind projects, 8 pumped hydro energy storage projects and 35 battery storage projects. In December 2024, Ausgrid was named the preferred network operator for the REZ. The development of wind farms in the region has seen strong opposition from some resident groups.

==== South-West REZ ====
The South-West REZ is located in south-western New South Wales surrounding the town of Hay. The renewable energy zone, announced in 2022, has a target of 3.98 gigawatts of grid capacity and 1 gigawatt of long-term storage. During the tender for access rights, bids for projects amounting to 15 gigawatts of capacity and 2 gigawatts of storage were received. An announcement on access rights is anticipated in February 2025. The renewable energy zone has reportedly received substantially less local opposition than the state's other REZs, and is expected to bring $2.8 billion in private investment to the region.

==== Illawarra REZ ====
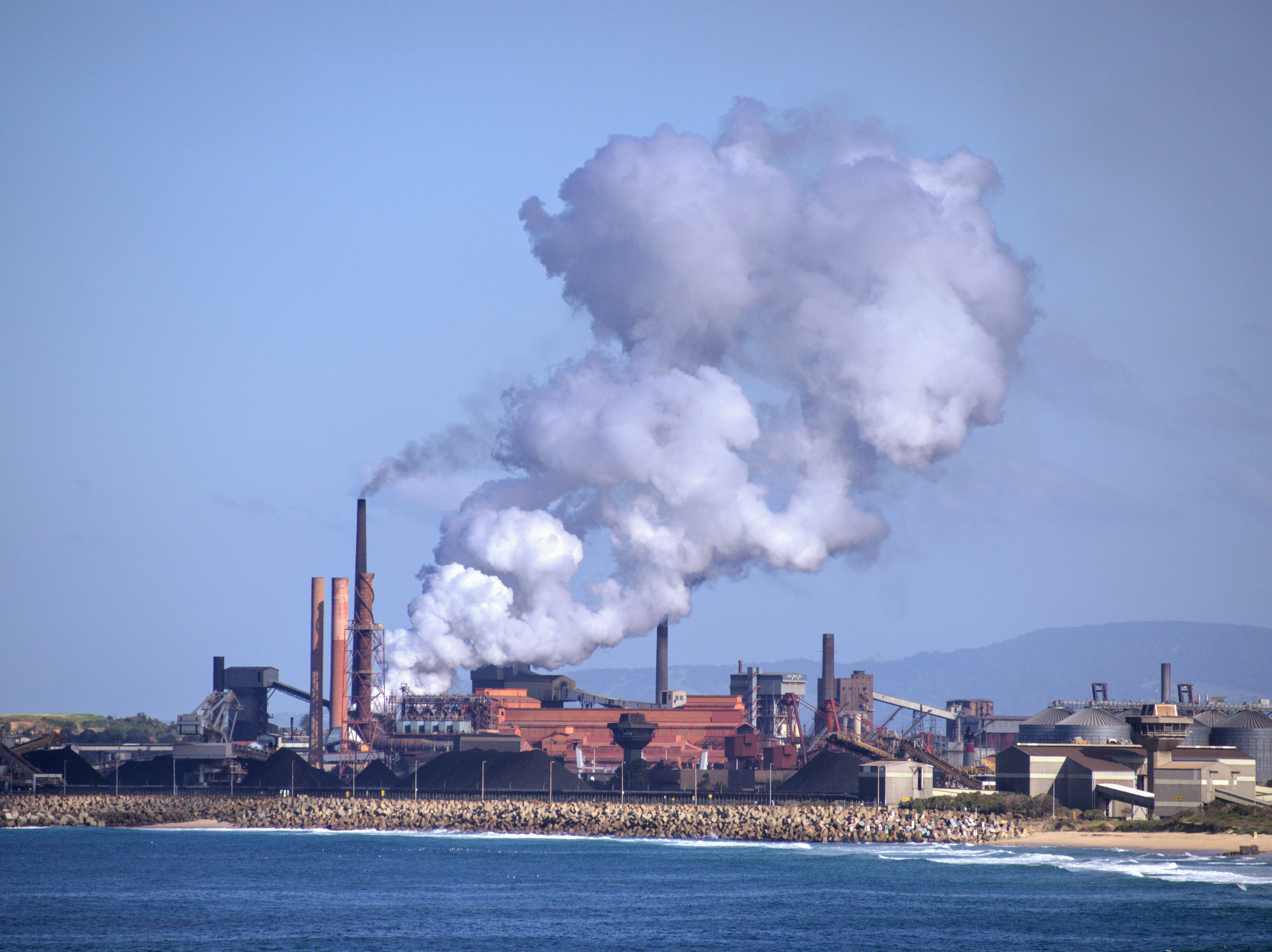
Renewable energy projects in the Illawarra REZ will help the steelworks in Port Kembla to transition to renewable energy

The Illawarra REZ is located in the Illawarra region, south of Wollongong. The region was declared New South Wales' fifth renewable energy zone in February 2023. The zone has been described as "unique" in that it will both produce and consume electricity, unlike other REZs located in more regional areas with little local demand for electricity. The Illawarra REZ will have a focus on offshore wind energy, taking advantage of existing port facilities built to support the coal and steel industries. It is expected to add at least 1 gigawatt of network capacity, with completion anticipated after 2030.

The REZ is connected to one of Australia's six Commonwealth offshore wind zones, which will cover an area of 1022 square kilometres located 20 kilometres off the coast. The offshore wind zone has been controversial and is opposed by the Coalition, with opponents claiming that offshore wind turbines are visually unappealing and will have a negative impact on the marine environment. This local opposition led to the circulation of a fake journal article claiming that the zone would kill 400 whales per year. The offshore wind zone was reduced to 1022 square kilometres from its original size of 1461 square kilometres and was moved further from the coast in response to these concerns. The offshore wind zone is anticipated to host up to 2.9 gigawatts of offshore wind capacity, and will support the large steel plant at Port Kembla.

=== Victoria ===
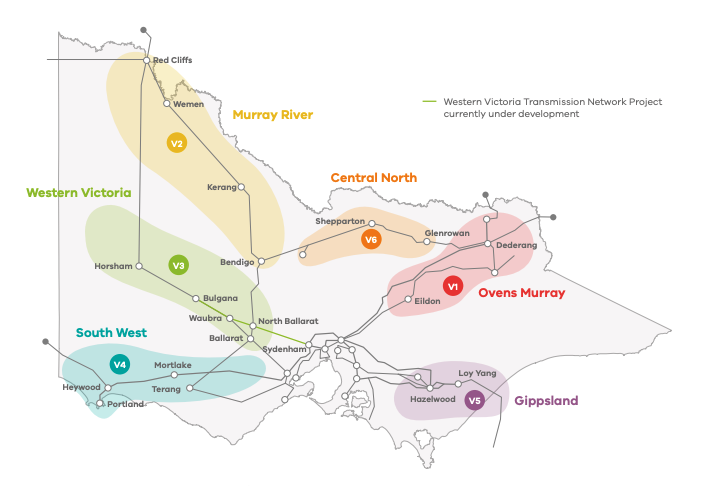
Map of REZs in Victoria

Victoria has announced six planned renewable energy zones: the South West Victoria, Western Victoria, Murray River, Central North Victoria, Ovens Murray and Gippsland REZs. In 2020, the Victorian government pledged $543 million to fund the REZ scheme, and in 2022 the federal government pledged an additional $1.5 billion. The Victorian government plans to use REZs to add up to 10 gigawatts of renewable energy capacity and up to 6.3 gigawatts of storage capacity by 2035. The REZs will be overseen by VicGrid, which will cap the projects that can be built in each REZ to minimise curtailment. Victoria's REZs are currently in the planning stage, with VicGrid in the process of mapping out the location of potential future wind farms, solar farms and transmission lines. The REZs will also be supported by the Melbourne Renewable Energy Hub located in Plumpton, which will include a 2.4 gigawatt battery set to be the largest in the Asia Pacific.

As in other states, Victoria's REZs have seen opposition from farmers and landowners concerned about the impact of renewable energy development. Many of these concerns have centred on the potential loss of agricultural land, as well as the visual effect of wind turbines and transmission lines. The Victorian government has initiated efforts to ensure that REZs maintain their "social license", including offering payments to affected communities and landowners.

Victoria's largest REZ will be the Gippsland REZ, located in the Gippsland region of south-eastern Victoria. The Gippsland REZ will connect to the federal government's Gippsland offshore wind zone. The offshore wind zone is expected to create 3000 construction jobs and 3000 operational jobs, and will add up to 10 gigawatts of renewable energy capacity upon completion. A second offshore wind zone is planned for the Southern Ocean, adjacent to the South West REZ. It will cover approximately 1000 square kilometres — having been scaled down from over 5000 square kilometres due to concerns from environmental groups — and will generate up to 2.9 gigawatts of wind energy.

=== Queensland ===
Queensland REZs
| Zone | REZ | Expected generation (MW) | Phase |
|---|---|---|---|
| Southern Queensland | Southern Downs | 2000–2600 | In flight |
| Southern Queensland | Western Downs | 2000–2600 | In flight |
| Southern Queensland | Wooloonga | 1800–2400 | Phase 2 |
| Southern Queensland | Darling Downs | 1600–2000 | Phase 2 |
| Southern Queensland | Tarong | 2000–2600 | Phase 3 |
| Central Queensland | Callide | 2000–2600 | Phase 1 |
| Central Queensland | Calliope | 1500–2000 | Phase 1 |
| Central Queensland | Isaac | 1400–1800 | Phase 2 |
| Central Queensland | Capricorn | 1400–1800 | Phase 2 |
| North and Far North Queensland | Far North Queensland | 500–700 | In flight |
| North and Far North Queensland | Collinsville | 1600–2000 | Phase 2 |
| North and Far North Queensland | Flinders | 2000–2400 | Phase 2 |

Queensland has identified twelve potential REZs across three zones. As of 2025, there are three in-flight REZ projects in Queensland: the Western Downs, Southern Downs and Far North Queensland REZs. These in flight REZ projects are being conducted under the existing National Electricity Rules, and may be converted to declared REZs in the future. Additional REZ projects under newly passed enabling legislation will be commenced in three phases, with phase 1 anticipated for the early-mid 2020s, phase 2 for the mid-late 2020s, and phase 3 for the early 2030s. The Queensland government plans to connect 22 gigawatts of renewable energy to the grid through its 12 REZs and anticipates that REZs will create 4000 direct construction jobs.

The Queensland government is currently in the process of conducting a number of REZ Readiness Assessments in consultation with communities. In September 2024, Queensland selected Powerlink Queensland as the state's REZ Delivery Body. The decarbonisation plan is expected to cost a total of $62 billion.

The projects anticipated as part of the REZ Roadmap include pumped hydropower projects in Borumba and Burdekin, green hydrogen hubs in Gladstone and Townsville, and new transmission lines, including the CopperString line from Townsville to Mount Isa. Fossil fuel power stations, including Kogan Creek Power Station, Tarong Power Station and Swanbank Power Station, will be converted into renewable energy hubs.

Queensland is also piloting Local Renewable Energy Zones in the towns of Townsville and Caloundra. This will involve the development of shared rooftop solar and battery energy storage systems that will allow households to transfer energy generated from rooftop solar into community batteries.

=== Tasmania ===
Tasmania's planned North West REZ will be the first renewable energy zone in the state. The REZ covers 115,000 hectares surrounding the city of Burnie. The REZ will involve the construction of transmission projects including the Marinus Link subsea cable, as well as a number of wind farms, including a 450 megawatt wind farm at Guildford, a 300 megawatt wind farm at Hellyer, and a proposed 900 megawatt wind farm at Robbins Island. It is also hoped that the REZ will support hydrogen exports from the state. The Tasmanian government hopes to use the Marinus Link cable to transmit excess renewable energy to mainland Australia, with a target of 200% renewable energy by 2040.

The REZ is also adjacent to a federal government offshore wind zone in the Bass Strait. The offshore wind zone will be supported by a renewable energy hub at the Bell Bay port within the REZ. It will span 7100 square kilometres and will be located at least 30km off the coast, after being scaled down from an original proposed size of 10,136 square kilometres, and will host up to 20 gigawatts of renewable energy. The zone is expected to create up to 12,000 construction jobs and 6000 ongoing operational jobs.

=== Projects ===
NSW Central-West Orana: Largest power plants planned
| Name | Commissioning date | Solar (MW) | Wind MW | Battery MWh / MW | Other | Location/coords | Refs |
|---|---|---|---|---|---|---|---|
| Liverpool Range | | | 1350 | | | 32°S 151°E | |
| Valley of the Winds | | | 919 | | | | |
| Sandy Creek | | 700 | | 1400 / 700 | | | |
| Spicers Creek | | | 700 | | | | |
| Birriwa | | 600 | | 1200 / 600 | | | |
| Tallawang | | 500 | | 1000 / 500 | | | |
| Cobbora | | 700 | | 1600 / 400 | | | |

== Criticism ==
One of the primary criticisms of renewable energy zones has been their impact on agricultural land. The impact of REZs on agriculture is disputed; some farmers argue that transmission lines and wind turbines have little impact on their operation, while others argue that renewable energy projects have seriously disrupted their farms and pose a threat to Australian agriculture. A 2024 survey conducted for lobby group Farmers for Climate Action found that a "silent majority" of farmers were in favour of renewable energy projects, but that their support was conditional on adequate consultation and project design considerations. Many farmers have expressed gratitude for the stable income provided by hosting renewable energy infrastructure, while others have complained of feeling threatened with compulsory acquisition or of being insufficiently consulted by developers. Both media reports and academic studies have found that REZs have the potential to "split" regional communities and create discord between supporters and opponents of renewable energy.

Critics of REZs have also pointed to the impact of large-scale renewable energy development on the environment. Opponents of offshore wind have argued that wind farms can have a negative impact on marine ecosystems, particularly on whales. Conservationists have also opposed REZ projects due to their impact on biodiversity. A number of wind farm projects in Queensland have involved land clearing and have been opposed by conservationists for their potential impact on threatened species. Some Indigenous groups have also opposed renewable energy projects on their traditional lands and have expressed frustration at a perceived lack of consultation.

Opponents of REZs have frequently criticised the size or scale of renewable energy infrastructure, as well as claiming that REZs have the potential to strain local infrastructure and services. Governments have attempted to respond to these concerns by establishing community benefit funds and emphasising local consultation in the development of REZs.
