= Corduroy Road Ruin Historic Site =

Historic road in New South Wales, Australia

- Location within New South Wales Location within Australia
- 31°26′37″S 148°32′07″E
- Location: East Coonamble Road, Curban, Gilgandra Shire, New South Wales, Australia

History
- Built: 1850–1923

Site notes
- Owner: Gilgandra Shire Council

New South Wales Heritage Register
- Official name: Corduroy Road Ruin Historic Site; Cobb & Co route
- Type: State heritage (archaeological-terrestrial)
- Designated: 5 October 2018
- Reference no.: 2015
- Type: Road
- Category: Transport - Land

Corduroy Road Ruin Historic Site is a disused road that forms part of a heritage-listed former stagecoach route in the rural locality of Curban, Gilgandra Shire, New South Wales, Australia. Built between 1850 and 1923. It is also known as Cobb & Co route. The property is owned by Gilgandra Shire Council. It was added to the New South Wales State Heritage Register on 5 October 2018.

== History ==
=== Settlement of the Curban area ===
The 1820s and 1830s in New South Wales were characterised by a push for new grazing lands beyond the Limit of Location established by Governor Darling. This was largely driven by growth in the colonial economy and increasing trade with Britain. The discovery of easy passes over the Liverpool Ranges opened paths for squatters to move mobs of cattle and sheep into the rich Liverpool Plains. As these groups were moving out of the Hunter Valley others were moving livestock northwest from the Lithgow and Bathurst regions to establish runs along the Castlereagh River.

Andrew Brown of Cooerwull, Bowenfels (at the western end of the Lithgow valley) is credited to be the first European to squat on the Castlereagh River which flows past Curban. Brown spent the years around 1830 scouting runs for himself and his employer, James Walker of Wallerawong. Around the same time squatters such as the Cox and Rouse brothers and representatives of William Lawson's extended family were moving into the region from the east and south. Brown and Walker's sheep were driven to their properties at Bowenfels and Wallerawang for shearing each year. It was easier in those times to move living animals than dead loads of wool. When Charles Darwin visited Walker's Wallerawong in 1836 he noted that: The sheep were some 15,000 in number, of which the greater part was feeding under the care of different shepherds, on unoccupied ground, at the distance of more than a hundred miles, and beyond the limits of the colony.

The general pattern of these early incursions into the region appears to have involved the identification of suitable pastures and the movement of cattle or sheep into the areas identified. Convict labourers, indentured servants or employees were left in small groups in isolated situations to tend the herds and flocks. By all accounts they generally lived in miserable circumstances deprived of decent food and in constant fear of attacks by Gamilaraay or Wiradjuri groups, or bushrangers who had moved beyond the reach of the law. During the 1830s cattle driven out from Mendooran were being departures along the Castlereagh River.

Governor Brisbane's mounted police kept some order, although often squatters and their servants often took the law into their own hands. A few punitive military expeditions had been mounted on the fringes of the region to establish the rule of British law. These had included Morisset's expedition against the Wiradjuri around Mudgee and the upper Macquarie in 1824 and Nunn's 1836 military expedition to the Gwydir and Namoi.

Policing of the frontier was taken over in the 1830s by the feared and hated Border Police. In 1836 Governor Bourke established regulations, which legalised squatting beyond the limits of the Nineteen Counties. The ensuing period, which coincided with the height of the economic boom of the 1830s, saw the consolidation of many landholdings around the Castlereagh. By 1836/37 licences were issued for stations along the river in the vicinity of the present-day Gilgandra, Curban, Armatree and Gulargambone. Richard Rouse at Mundooran, Thomas Perrie at Breelong, James Bennett at Bearbong and Curban, Lowes at Carlganda and Yalcogreen, John Hall at Calingoingong were all early settlers.

Another early pioneer to the area was Andrew Brown of Cooerwull, Bowenfels (at the western end of the Lithgow valley) who is thought to be the first European to squat on the Castlereagh River. In the 1830s Andrew Brown was in this area looking for land for both himself and his employer, James Walker of Wallerawong eventually establishing stations known as Yarragrin, Gundy, Bidden, Mogie Melon, Wallumburawang, Tooraweenah and Nullen. Records indicate that John Jude and John Hall were the first people to hold licences to departure stock on the Castlereagh River downstream from Mendooran. They lodged their application for a licence on 31 December 1836 with the description "Carlingangong North Western beyond Wellington Valley". By 30 September 1839 John Jude acquired a licence for the adjoining area called Armatree.

Accounts of the murder of dairyman Abraham Meers at John Hall's Carlingoengoen Station on 6 August 1839 confirms that Hall's holdings were well established by this time. When John Jude died in 1866 he left Armatree, New Armatree and Willancorah to his son Page Otto Jude. "Page Jude had already acquired Illumurgalia West and Illumurgalia East from Andrew Brown of Cooewull in 1864". Alexander McGregor had taken up Merrigal on the western side of the Castlereagh in 1845. His grandsons "held large tracts of land from Armatree to Collie".

=== Transport routes and Cobb & Co. ===
Transport routes linking European settlements in the region generally followed watercourses and a number of tracks were developed along both sides of the Castlereagh River. One of the main connections between Gilgandra and the outside world followed the Castlereagh River from Mendooran. This route was followed by wool drays on their way to the coast. It passed through Eringanerin and traversed the eastern side of the river to Coonamble. In the Armatree (Curban) district this road traversed the western boundary of Page Jude's Illumurgalia East Run.

As Cobb & Co expanded their coaching routes across New South Wales the company obtained a growing number of mail contracts. Between 1874 and 1880 they established twice-weekly mail services linking Gilgandra to Dubbo and a service from Gulgong to Gilgandra via Cobbora and Mendooran then on to Curban, Gulargambone and Coonamble. The Coonamble service was later increased to three days per week. Coach drivers included James Brown, Paddy Murray and William Walden. The road carrying the coach route was identified on the map of the Parish of Callangoan prepared by the Department of Lands in 1880. Cobb and Co services along the East Coonamble road through Curban ceased in 1898, but others continued the coach run, including Bill Rowley, Adam Nolan, and one of the last official mail coach services in the region was on this road and was run by W. Hogan until 1923.

=== Travelling the coach routes ===
An account of the NSW Minister for Public Works, James Henry Young's visit to the region in September 1897, described the difficulties faced by those traversing the black soil plains along the Castlereagh: By the time the travellers had made a little further progress towards Dubbo it was sunset -which, by the way, is generally a sight worth seeing on the plains to the west - and it was soon apparent that a lively, or at least a dreary, time was in store. The rains which had fallen in the morning lay in large pools stretching out in all directions as far as, in the rapidly approaching night, the eyes could reach. But the driver of an inland coach has a way of picking out his road which seems almost mysterious. He drives a little distance from it at times, picks out a new track, dodges between trees whose proximity to one another is just sufficient to allow the wheels of his coach to pass between, and he only rarely lodges his passengers in one of those slushy, spongy patches which country people refer to indifferently as "bog," but which give rise to unpleasant apprehensions in the minds of benighted travellers accustomed to city thoroughfares. "Are ye bogged?" sang out the trooper, as the Ministerial coach sank nearly up to the axles in one of these treacherous portions of the NSW Government road. "I'll git out all right," the driver replied; and he shouted to his struggling team, and swung round his whip with a succession of sharp cracks until the coach was dragged to a place of comparative safety. It was in endeavouring to avoid a bog and pass between soma shrubbery that one of the front wheels of the coach struck a tree which could not be discerned in the darkness. The outlook was not reassuring. Creeks, rivers, and pools of stagnant water ahead were reported to those who inundated the driver with queries as to "How long will it last?" "When shall we get there?" 'Won't we miss the Sydney train?" The only assurance that was forthcoming was that the party would " Git there fust". Armatree Plains were reached in due course, and were crossed at a pretty uniform speed of one mile an hour.

The country here differs in configuration but little from the surrounding plains, and its designation is only comprehensible as specifying a part of the whole. Several times whilst crossing little streams a couple of feet in depth it seemed that the horses were going to fail, but the rough experience of travellers did not embrace so unromantic an episode. When the party had to leave the coach in times of difficulty there was sufficient dry land within access to allow of the swampy patches to be avoided.

=== Corduroy Roads ===
While noting the "slushy, spongy patches" on the coach route between Gulargambone and Dubbo (which includes Curban) the above newspaper report noted that the geology of the region, and unavailability of stone made the cost of constructing macadamised roads prohibitive. The only practical method of stabilising boggy sections of road was considered to be corduroy. Corduroy was a practical solution as large quantities of cypress logs were available for this purpose. The cost of Corduroy Roads was estimated to be A£800 per mile.

It was common practice to lay sections of corduroy road in the Central West to provide an all-weather surface on boggy sections of the black soil plains, also over very sandy sections of road, and creek or river crossings. Corduroy involved the placement of small cut logs or saplings side by side across the direction of travel to provide a relatively stable, if rather bumpy, surface for the mail coaches. In his memoir of pastoral work in western New South Wales Duke Tritton recounted an uncomfortable journey across a section of corduroy road located east of the Bourbah Hotel. He noted that four or five miles on from the hotel "the road ran through a cypress pine forest. It was like driving through a tunnel with the tops of the trees meeting overhead." The road through the forest had been corduroyed with cypress logs about nine inches in diameter to stabilise a very sandy section. 'Had the upper side been squared, it would have made a good job, but the logs had been left round and it made the surface incredibly rough. The bump, bump, bump, was hard on the nerves and it was a great relief when we bumped for the last time. The horses could travel only at a slow walk and it took over an hour to negotiate the four miles".

A description of travelling on a corduroy road near Wyong was obtained in an oral history interview in 2010 "when I was a kid I can remember bouncing over it in the sulky cart to town. My father was a bullocky teamster with a wagon and when they used to take the logs and that to Wyong on the big wagons they used to bog in that feature where they put those logs in".

Corduroy roads are a technique that have been used in Europe since Roman times, and into the 20th century, most notably during WWI and WWII. Corduroy roads have their origin in the European Neolithic wooden trackways that were laid down on the surface of bogs to enable people to walk across, some of which are 4,600 years old.

=== The Corduroy Road Curban Historic Site near Curban ===
This corduroy road was possibly originally built or re-made by Charles Law, owner of the nearby Wattle Park selection. Charles Law arrived in New South Wales with his parents at the age of two with his parents. The family settled in the Braidwood district and, after finishing his schooling Charles headed north to fossick for gold. Having worked at Gulgong and Hill End he drifted to the Gulargambone district where he worked as a fencer and well sinker. He married Elizabeth Ann Knight of Cassillis and the couple settled in the Armatree area. Law apparently continued to contract for civil works while operating his Wattle Park selection. In 1901 Law took up several pastoral blocks on the eastern side of the Travelling Stock Route. Nearby property surrounding the Travelling Stock Route was taken up by William Blowes in 1906. Law and Blowes were connected by marriage when William Blowes Junior married Mary Law at Wattle Park.

In 1905 this section of road was noted as "bog": "The drivers had a rough time passing Armatree, the roads being boggy". Sections of corduroy were still being added in 1905: "Public Works Dept. acknowledging receipt of letter asking that the river be corduroyed on the road to Curban". Following the establishment of Gilgandra Shire Council in 1906 the Council apparently took up responsibility for maintenance of the road between Curban and Armatree. In his report to Council of 5 August 1910 the Shire Engineer noted that he had inspected a corduroy crossing at Curban. The Engineer also recommended repairs to the road between Curban and Coonamble. In 1915 an article describing a "motor car" trip from Coonamble to Gilgandra, passing through Armatree and Curban, notes "the Gular-Coonamble soils may be described generally as black and heavy, and the corduroy roads remind us of the difficulties of negotiating these saltbush plains in wet weather. Travelling is now easy, but one shudders to contemplate what it must be in a rainy season, and we can in some measure estimate the tardiness and the irksomeness of traffic in the pre-railway days for the coaches and teams".

During the 1960s much of the corduroy road was lifted and trucked to Dubbo to provide fuel for brick kilns.

== Description ==
The Corduroy Road Historic Site remains are located on the East Coonamble Road, 12 kilometres (7.5 mi) northwest of the small village Curban and 27 kilometres (17 mi) northwest of Gilgandra. While the exact extent of the corduroy road cannot be determined, it is possible that it originally extended across current freehold properties that run adjacent to the East Coonamble Road. The Corduroy Road Historic Site is located in a road reserve situated between a Travelling Stock Reserve and Pastoral Properties, developed sometime between 1800 and 1895. The corduroy road is adjacent to and runs parallel with the current East Coonamble Road approximately five kilometres (three miles) from the small village of Curban.

The Corduroy Road Ruin Historical Site comprises approximately 200 metres (660 ft) of cypress pine logs laid across the direction of travel of the road. The northern end of the section is marked by the remains of a former gateway of cypress pine posts and located at the eastern side is another hardwood mile wood post.

Corduroy roads were built when there was a need to move vehicles with goods or passengers through marshy, boggy, low-lying lands, including creek crossings, and either sandy or muddy boggy areas. To build the roads people would chop down small trees, about 20 to 25 centimetres (8 to 10 in) in diameter, cutting the branches off and laying the trees vertical to the roadway. These roads were usually built in small runs, through the boggy areas of an otherwise more solid road.

=== Condition ===
As at 18 October 2017, the Site is generally in sound condition, however heavy grass growth in wet seasons is a potential threat to the site. In 2017 a wet season had resulted in dense and high grass growth, which made it difficult to see the full extent of the road. This was also the case in 2013 when the heritage advisor took photos (nomination form). However, earlier and unfortunately undated photos in the Gilgandra Library were taken during drought conditions and the entire section of road is exposed and clearly visible.

The remnants of the Corduroy Road Ruin Historical Site are also incomplete with many logs either missing or disturbed. The logs used were cypress pines, a species that would have been in plentiful supply at the time in the local area. There is some deterioration of the wood occurring owing to wet conditions, contact with the ground, and exposure to the sun, wind and rain. The travelling stock reserve is not fenced off from the road reserve and stock may also occasionally provide a potential threat.

The site is considered to have medium archaeological potential.

=== Modifications and dates ===
The landscape and environment surrounding this section of road has gone through significant changes over the years particularly in relation to different land uses. There would have been many modifications made since the corduroy road was built, and presumably some logs would have been replaced when necessary but this is difficult to determine. The corduroy road was originally much longer, as in the 1960s much of the road was lifted and the logs trucked to Dubbo to provide fuel for brick kilns. It is unclear how long it was, but it was an unusually long section of corduroy road.

== Heritage listing ==
As at 25 May 2018, the Corduroy Road Ruin Historic site is of state heritage significance for its research potential as the largest surviving example of a corduroy road in New South Wales, and the only in-situ, visible and unburied large-scale example. The road provides rare evidence of colonial road making technology and has the potential to reveal more information about the purpose and history of the route, and has potential for discovery of historic artefacts discarded along the road by travellers.

The Corduroy Road Ruin Historical Site is of state heritage significance as an intact and rare survivor of the era of horse-drawn coach transport that ended with the construction of the Dubbo to Coonamble railway line. The site provides evidence of the development of early road networks, supply and communication routes in the Castlereagh district during the 19th century, and the means used by early settlers to cope with the poor road conditions during this period. The corduroy road is an example of the practical and inexpensive method employed to improve road conditions in a period when funding for road improvements in the central western districts of New South Wales was limited. It demonstrates a once common technique of road building which did not require specific engineering skills and utilised locally available cypress pine. The use of cypress pine logs reflects the once abundant natural resource of cypress pine, a termite resistance material, that was widely utilised for corduroy roads, building and fencing, in an area where stone material for roadmaking and building has limited distribution.

The corduroy road is of state heritage significance due to its association with Cobb & Co coaching tracks of the 19th century, this was once a part of a main route used by the legendary coaches from around 1872 to deliver mail and passengers from Dubbo and Mudgee via Gilgandra, Curban, Armatree, Gulargambone and Coonamble. This route also extended north to link NSW markets with the rapidly developing Central Western Queensland. Cobb & Co employees were pioneering coachmen, servicing the outback, braving the attacks of bushrangers, handling and breeding of many thousands of horses, in particular the "coach horses", a breed of horses that was developed for Australia's unique and harsh conditions. The stories of Cobb & Co, and the trails they ran, are a significant part of NSW and Australian history, folklore and culture, lending depth and character to the Australian image. The Corduroy Road also demonstrates the interrelationship of coaching and travelling stock routes, and early settlements in the Central West District.

Corduroy Road Ruin Historic Site was listed on the New South Wales State Heritage Register on 5 October 2018 having satisfied the following criteria.

The place is important in demonstrating the course, or pattern, of cultural or natural history in New South Wales.

The Corduroy Road Ruin Historic Site is of state significance as it is an intact remnant of the early days of road transport in the Castlereagh region. It is also a rare survivor of the era of horse-drawn coach transport that ended with the construction of the Dubbo to Coonamble railway line.

The site is important as it demonstrates the role such road and road making techniques had in opening the inland areas of NSW to the development of pastoralism, agriculture and settlement in the state, and linking NSW with rapidly developing Central Western Queensland.

With the growth of the Central West from the 1800s onwards there was a need to improve communication between communities and market access for farmers. The corduroy road is an example of the practical and inexpensive method employed to improve road conditions in a period when funding for road improvements in the central western districts of New South Wales was limited.

The site is important in demonstrating the example of a once common technique of road building which did not require specific engineering skills and was readily employed by local early settlers, farmers and residents as well as government funded road making, to overcome difficult conditions along supply and communication routes.

The historic site is also an important link in the coaching tracks of the 19th century and the early movement of stock to markets. The Corduroy Road also demonstrates the interrelationship of coaching and travelling stock routes, and early settlements in the Central West District of what was to become New South Wales.

The place has a strong or special association with a person, or group of persons, of importance of cultural or natural history of New South Wales's history.

The Corduroy Road Ruin Historic Site is of state significance due to its association with Cobb & Co as this was once a part of a main route used by the legendary coaches from around 1872 to deliver mail and passengers from Dubbo and Mudgee via Gilgandra, Curban, Armatree, Gulargambone and Coonamble. The inns or "changing stations" that serviced the routes were themselves important as the gathering places of community for refreshments, exchange of news, and for dropping off or picking up goods. Men of Cobb & Co were pioneering coachmen, servicing the outback, braving the attacks of bushrangers, handling and breeding many thousands of horses, in particular the "coach horses", a breed of horses that was developed for Australia's unique and harsh conditions. The stories of Cobb & Co, and the trails they ran, are a significant part of Australian history, folklore and culture, lending depth and character to our Australian image. The road from Dubbo to Coonamble, including the Corduroy Historic Site, was one of the last coach mail runs in NSW, ending in 1923.

The place has potential to yield information that will contribute to an understanding of the cultural or natural history of New South Wales.

The Corduroy Road Ruin Historic site is of state significance for its research potential as the largest example of a corduroy road surviving in New South Wales. These roads are rare evidence of colonial road making technology which have the potential to reveal more information about their purpose and history. The corduroy road remnant has the potential to provide information on the construction of corduroy roads to cross swampy or boggy ground in the 19th century, and has potential for discovery of historic artefacts discarded along the road by travellers. Other known corduroy roads in NSW survived because they are buried, this is the only known example that can be readily viewed in-situ.

The place possesses uncommon, rare or endangered aspects of the cultural or natural history of New South Wales.

The Corduroy Road Ruin Historic Site is of state significance as a rare surviving example of an intact 19th century corduroy road. It is the largest known remaining example of a corduroy road in NSW, and the only known example that can be readily viewed in-situ.

The place is important in demonstrating the principal characteristics of a class of cultural or natural places/environments in New South Wales.

The Corduroy Road Ruin Historic Site is of state significance as the physical evidence of corduroy road demonstrates the importance of early roads in the early settlement of the region, and in the supply of services to early settlers living outside of the major settlement areas.

Corduroy roads also demonstrate the early stages of timber-getting production in the district, which was important in the growth and stability of the early colony. The use of cypress pine logs reflects the once abundant natural resource of cypress pine, a termite resistant material, that was widely utilised for corduroy roads, building and fencing, and characterises the Central West of NSW.

== See also ==
- List of roads in New South Wales
