= Troy Junction–Merrygoen railway line =

Railway line in Australia

Coordinates: 32°15′00″S 148°37′00″E

Overview
- Status: Operational
- Owner: Australian Rail Track Corporation (lessee)
- Locale: Orana
- Termini: Troy Junction; Merrygoen
- Stations: 9 (all closed)

History
- Opened: 8 April 1918

Technical
- Track gauge: 1,435 mm (4 ft 8 1/2 in)
- Signalling: Train Order Working
- Train protection system: Train Management and Control System

The Troy Junction–Merrygoen railway line is a railway line in regional New South Wales, Australia. At its western end it links to Dubbo in the Central West–Orana, while at its eastern end in Merrygoen the line joins in to a cross-country link towards the Main Northern railway line in the Hunter Valley. This allows goods from the western part of the state such as grain to access the Port of Newcastle while bypassing Sydney.

In December 2025, a timber trestle bridge on the line over Beni Creek was destroyed in a bushfire, forcing grain traffic to be redirected temporarily. The Australian Rail Track Corporation reopened the railway line in May 2026 after completing a new concrete ballast top bridge over the creek.

== Junctions ==
At Troy Junction in Dubbo the railway line to Merrygoen branches off the Coonamble railway line.

At Merrygoen, the line joins the Gwabegar railway line.

== Stations ==
Passenger services are no longer provided.

- Boothenba
- Beni
- Barbigal
- Ballimore
- Muronbung
- Elong Elong
- Boomley
- Mendooran
- Merrygoen

== See also ==
- Rail transport in New South Wales
