= Captain Moonlight =

Captain Moonlight may refer to:

- Captain Moonlite, an Irish-born Australian bushranger
- A nickname for agrarian violence in Ireland; see Whiteboys
