= Elong Elong, New South Wales =

Elong Elong is a locality on the Golden Highway in New South Wales, Australia.

Elong Elong has several houses and a grain silo on the line from Dubbo to Binnaway. It is located between Ballimore and Cobbora. East of Elong Elong, the railway turns away from the Talbragar River and heads north through the forest to Mendooran.

According to the 2016 Australian census it has a population of 115 people.

== See also ==
- List of reduplicated Australian place names
