= Elong Elong =

Elong Elong may refer to:

- Jacques Elong Elong (1985–2025), Cameroonian football player
- Elong Elong, New South Wales, locality in New South Wales, Australia
