= Sam Poo =

Chinese bushranger

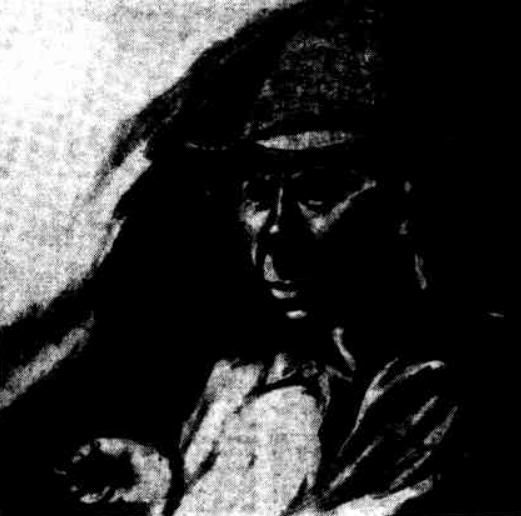
- A newspaper artist's impression of Sam Poo, created circa 1936 (more than 70 years after his death).
- Died: 19 December 1865; Bathurst, New South Wales
- Cause of death: Execution by hanging
- Other name: Cranky Sam
- Convictions: Shooting with intent to kill Wilful murder
- Penalty: Death sentence

Sam Poo (died 19 December 1865) was a Chinese bushranger in Australia who was active in New South Wales during early 1865. Poo emigrated to Australia in the early 1860s during the gold rush. Being an unsuccessful miner, he turned to bushranging. He robbed travellers on the Gulgong–Mudgee for several weeks. On 3 February 1865, Poo killed Senior Constable John Ward, who was looking for him. After the murder of Ward, the New South Wales Police organised a large-scale manhunt, which lasted two weeks and resulted in Poo being arrested and seriously injured during his arrest.

Poo was tried two times after his arrest. The first time on 10 April, he was tried for shooting with intent to kill at Aboriginal tracker Henry Hughes during his arrest and he was found guilty by the jury. The second time on 10 October, he was tried for the wilful murder of John Ward and he was again found guilty by the jury. He was sentenced to death and he was executed by hanging on 19 December 1865. Poo was fictionalised in David Martin's novel The Hero of Too (1965) and since has been a theme of a circus show, a children's novel and a planned feature film.

== Name and early career ==
Sam Poo was not his real name, as a Chinese equivalent for it does not exist. Robert Macklin suggests that it is either a derogatory nickname created by white settlers and used by the police or a slang rendering of similar syllables. Macklin also describes the first theory as the more likely one. Several newspaper articles in 1930s and 1940s have referred to a Chinese man who killed Constable Ward as "Li Hang Chiak", but none of the articles mention Sam Poo as Chiak's alternative name. (Note: See:) He was also nicknamed "Cranky Sam" and "Phantom Chinaman".

Sam Poo was a Chinese emigrant to Australia during the Gold Rush. He worked as a "hatter" (miner prospecting without a partner who would warn them of dangers) at Talbragar River between present-day Dunedoo and Mudgee in New South Wales. Being an unsuccessful miner, he turned to bushranging. He began practising pidgin-English, horse riding and shooting, using a tree stump as his target. His Chinese compatriots, who were scrupulously law-abiding, described him as a solitary character and said he was "no good".

He was armed with a shotgun and a pistol, and he would lie at a hideaway on the Gulgong–Mudgee road where he'd wait for pedestrians whom he threatened and demanded all their valuables. His victims were mostly Chinese but he also targeted white settlers. Several days prior to the killing of John Ward, Poo allegedly threatened a Mudgee woman, Elizabeth Golding, after speaking with her daughter. According to Golding, Poo said to her "if I cannot have my will of the girl, I will of you".

== Murder of John Ward and manhunt ==
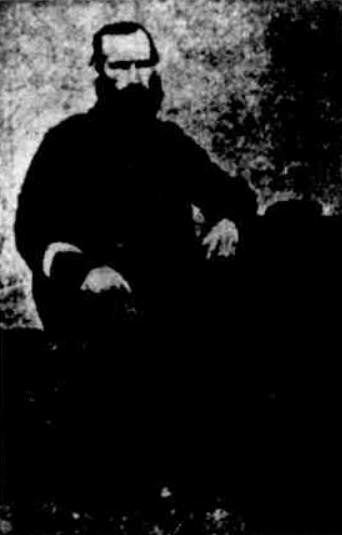
Senior Constable John Ward, who was murdered by Sam Poo

On 2 February 1865, Poo robbed a hut of a shepherd who was in the employment of farmer James Plunkett and later that day he threatened to shoot two stockmen if they didn't inform him of the topography of the locality. After these two events, locals sent for the police stationed at Denison Town who arrived at midnight. The next morning, Plunkett, Mr. S. E. Plumb, and the police set out to scour the bush for Poo but they were unsuccessful. When they returned at around midday, they found out that Poo had just visited a shepherd's hut a quarter of a mile from the head station. After receiving directions from the shepherd's wife, they proceeded their search towards Mudgee but they were again unsuccessful. At around 5 pm, they met two travellers who said that a bushranger addressed them in a threatening manner about 4 miles (6.4 kilometres) up the road. Travellers described him as a Chinaman with a revolver in the belt and gun on the shoulder. After riding 9 miles up the road, Plunkett and police officer Constable Todd found policeman John Ward heavily injured.

At 10 am on 3 February 1865, Senior Constable John Ward of the New South Wales Police Force stationed at Coonabarabran was returning home from a prisoner escort to Mudgee. He was informed by two men that an armed Chinese man was robbing travellers at a locality known as Barney's Reef. After a short search, Ward found Poo's camp and approached him. Poo ran off into the bush after Ward approached him and said "What are you doing — put down your gun." Poo replied "you policeman — me fire" and he shot Ward in the chest. Ward fired several shots back but he did not hit Poo. Shortly afterwards, Ward was found by Plunkett and Todd. Plunkett took Ward to Birriwa station where during the night arrived Doctor William King who treated him and had previously ridden 45 miles (72 kilometres) to reach him. Nevertheless, Ward died the next day at around 4:30 pm and was buried on the same day.

After Ward's death, a manhunt which a 1961 Sydney Morning Herald article described as "one of early Australia's biggest manhunts" ensued. On 18 February, Poo was tracked down by Aboriginal tracker Henry Hughes. Poo was at a gully 10 miles (16 kilometres) from Cobbora when he was found by constables M'Mahon and Burns. Poo fired at them and escaped to the scrub, where two policemen lost him. Afterwards, M'Mahon and Burns returned to Hughes and Senior Constable Todd, who had previously split to search for Poo along the river. Hughes soon found Poo and several shots were exchanged: a shotgun shot fired by Todd clipped Poo's head and neck. Burns then rushed to secure him. When Poo raised himself from the ground and tried to fire again, Burns hit him with the butt-end of his rifle, fracturing Poo's skull and smashing the stock to pieces. On the morning of 20 February, Poo arrived to a gaol in Mudgee where he received medical treatment.

== Trials and execution ==
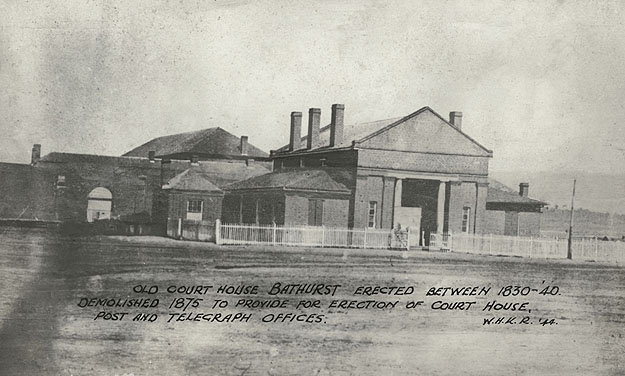
Old Bathurst Court House where Poo's trials took place

On 10 April, Poo was indicted on shooting at Henry Hughes with intent to kill. He did not answer the charge, remaining mute. The jury was then empanelled to try whether he was wilfully mute or unhappily so. After hearing of several witnesses, the jury retired for half an hour and brought a verdict of dumbness by malice. The judge decided that this was equivalent to plea of not guilty and another jury was empanelled. Crown prosecutor Edward Butler presented the case, the policemen involved in Poo's capture were heard as witnesses and the victim Hughes was also heard. In his testimony, Hughes said that Poo's shot hit the rim of his hat. After the hearings and presentation of evidence, the jury retired for a few minutes and returned a verdict of wounding with an intent to kill. Poo, being very weak and emaciated, was remanded for sentence.

Poo was tried for the murder of John Ward on 10 October 1865 at Bathurst Court House. He was charged with wilful murder and he was defended by court-appointed barrister, Joseph Innes, who pleaded him not guilty. Poo took no part in proceedings as he had little or no understanding of what was going on; according to The Sydney Mail, "ever since his apprehension [Poo] has been quite weak in intellect". The government interpreter Sing Shigh, who was tasked with translating evidence to the accused, did not understand Poo's southern dialect. After being presented with evidence and after hearing several witnesses, the jury retired for a short interval and returned a verdict of guilty and Poo was sentenced to death. Robert Macklin points out that no one placed Poo at the crime scene, no ballistic evidence that Poo's weapon fired the fatal shot was presented, and that Poo was too mentally weakened to stand a trial. Macklin concludes that what happened to Poo was "legal lynching".

On 19 December 1865, Poo was hanged at the Bathurst Gaol. Three Chinese prisoners were brought to watch the hanging alongside a dozen civilians who had gathered. According to Sydney Mail, Poo "appeared to be perfectly unconscious of his fate" and was clapping his hands at the door of his cell until his arms were pinioned by the executioners. He was then led to the gallows without speaking a word or raising his head. A different story of his execution is given in Great Bushrangers and Outlaws, a book about the history of bushranging published in 1974, which portrays Poo in a positive manner. In this version, Poo has last words, those being a request to a hospital warder that "he [does] not wish to see or speak to any of his countrymen".

== Legacy ==
=== In historical accounts ===
Historian Charles White wrote the first and the most influential account of Poo in his 1921 book Australian Bushranging: Captain Moonlite. Ronald Noonan criticises this account for anti-Chinese sentiment, noting that whenever referring to Poo's violence White uses the pejorative term "Chinaman". Next account of Poo is given by Robert Travers in his 1973 book Rogues' March: A Chronicle of Colonial Crime in Australia. In contrast to White's account, Travers depicts Poo as a moral avenger and as a traditional outlaw hero. Travers omits Poo's alleged threat to Elizabeth Golding and her daughter.

=== In popular culture ===
Sam Poo was raised from obscurity when he was fictionalised as Lam Yut Soon in David Martin's novel The Hero of Too (1965).

His life was dramatised for radio in The Shadow of Sam Poo (1930) and episodes of Outlawry Under the Gums (1933).

Since then, Circus Oz created a show about Poo in 1993, Christopher Stitt wrote a children's novel about Poo in 2003, and in 2014 Robert Macklin and Chinese-born film producer Cindy Jia Li teamed up to create Aodaliya Gold, a movie about Poo and in the same year the trailer for the movie was released. In 2015, film companies from Canberra, JIA Films and SilverSun Pictures partnered with Yuezhong Pictures from China to create Aodaliya Gold with the budget of $15 million. Sam Poo appears in two paintings by Mudgee artist, Michael Bourke in an exhibition 'A Brief History of Mudgee' held at Mudgee Arts Precinct in April 2022.
