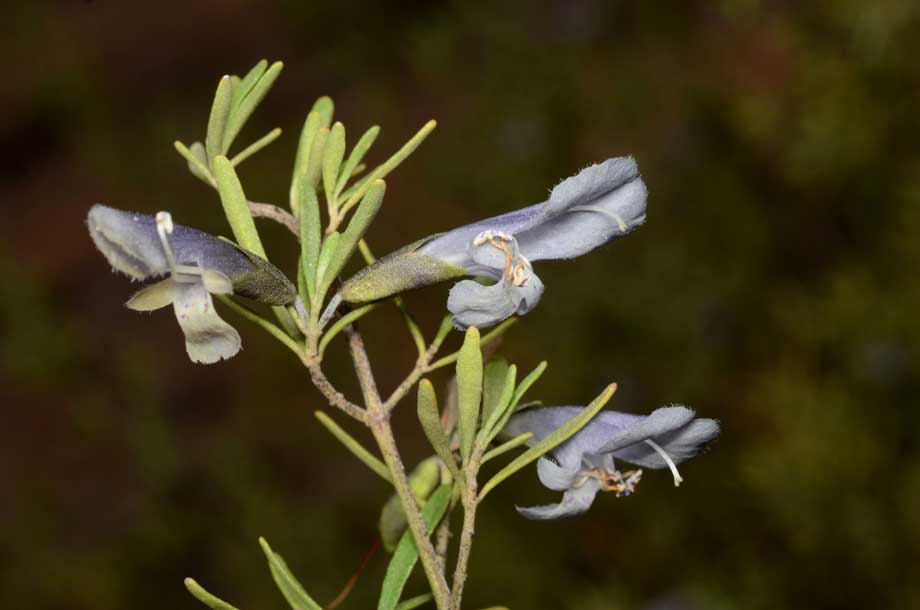
- Prostanthera ringens near Goondiwindi

Scientific classification
- Kingdom: Plantae
- Clade: Tracheophytes
- Clade: Angiosperms
- Clade: Eudicots
- Clade: Asterids
- Order: Lamiales
- Family: Lamiaceae
- Genus: Prostanthera
- Species: P. ringens

Binomial name
- Prostanthera ringens Benth.
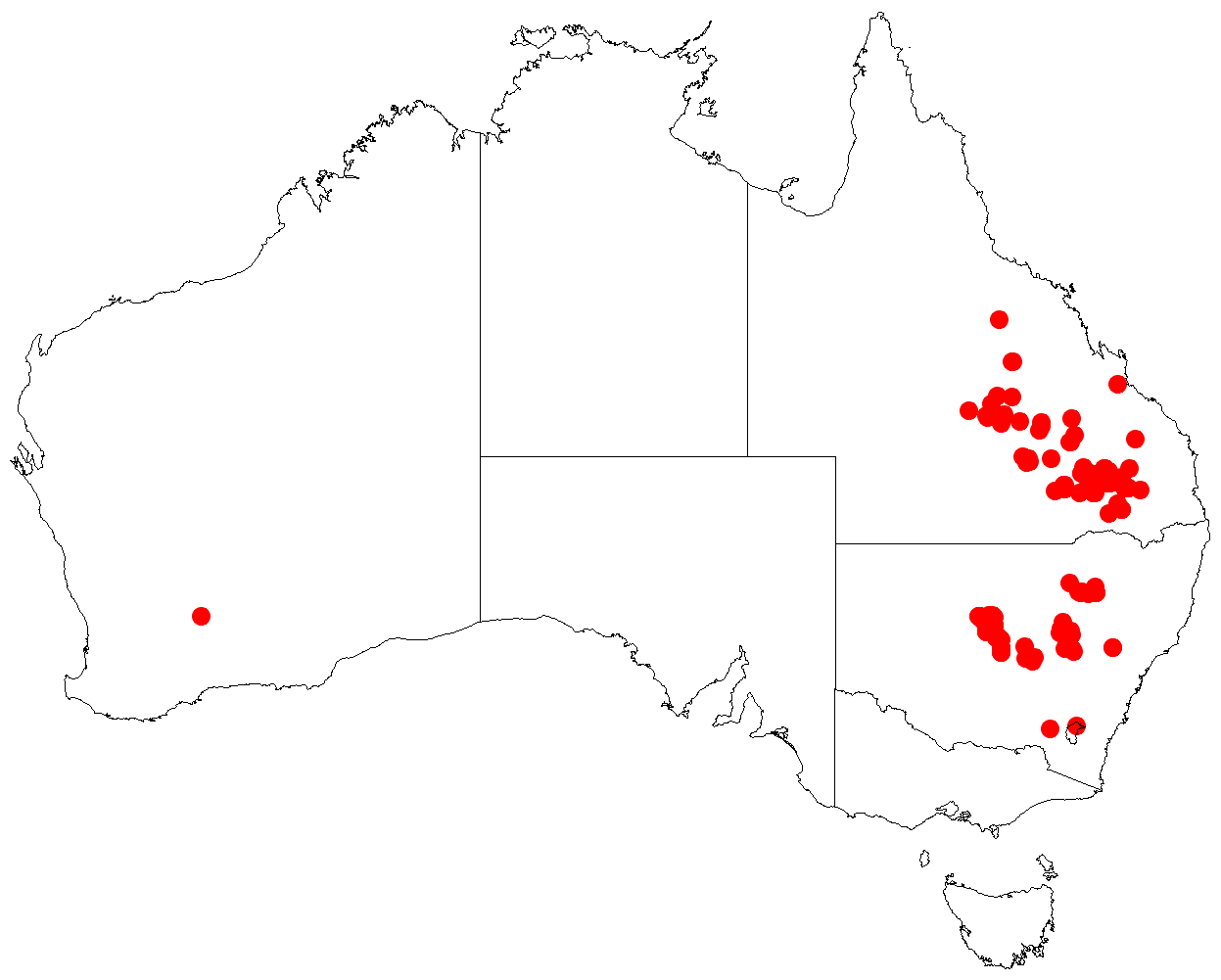
- Occurrence data from AVH

Synonyms
- Prostanthera lepidota C.T.White; Prostanthera rigens F.Muell. orth. var.

= Prostanthera ringens =

Gaping mint-bush

Species of flowering plant

Prostanthera ringens, commonly known as gaping mint-bush, is a species of flowering plant in the family Lamiaceae and is endemic to eastern Australia. It is a bushy shrub with four-sided, hairy, densely glandular branches, oblong or egg-shaped leaves and pale blue to greenish or yellow flowers arranged singly in leaf axils.

== Description ==
Prostanthera ringens is a bushy shrub that typically grows to a height of 2 m (6 ft 7 in) with four-sided, hairy, densely glandular branches. The leaves are egg-shaped to oblong, 6–15 mm (0.24–0.59 in) long and 2–6 mm (0.079–0.236 in) wide on a petiole up to 3 mm (0.12 in) long. The flowers are arranged singly in leaf axils with bracteoles about 1 mm (0.039 in) long at the base. The sepals are 6–8 mm (0.24–0.31 in) long forming a tube about 5 mm (0.20 in) long with two lobes about 2 mm (0.079 in) long. The petals are 14–23 mm (0.55–0.91 in) and pale blue to greenish or yellow, forming a tube about 10 mm (0.39 in) long.

== Taxonomy ==
Prostanthera ringens was first formally described in 1848 by George Bentham in Thomas Mitchell's Journal of an Expedition into the Interior of Australia.

== Distribution and habitat ==
Gaping mint-bush grows on rocky sandstone ridges, on stony hills and in forest on the western slopes and plains of New South Wales north from near Mendooran and in eastern central Queensland, including in the Darling Downs, Maranoa and Mitchell districts.

== Conservation status ==
Prostanthera ringens is classified as of "least concern" in Queensland under the Queensland Government Nature Conservation Act 1992.
