= The Shadow of Sam Poo =

1930 Australian radio play

- Genre: drama play
- Running time: 30 mins (9:03 pm – 9:33 pm)
- Country of origin: Australia
- Language: English
- Home station: 2BL
- Syndicates: ABC
- Written by: James J. Donnelly
- Original release: March 3, 1930

The Shadow of Sam Poo is a 1930 Australian radio play about bushranger Sam Poo by James J. Donnelly. It was the first in a series of plays about bushrangers. The play was a rare dramatisation of a Chinese Australia for the time. It was also one of the first Australian radio dramas, which gathered fame quickly

The play aired in March 1930 on the ABC and went for 30 minutes.

== Premise ==
The play follows Sam Poo, a Chinese man who becomes a bushranger in Australia.

== Cast ==
- Bryson Taylor
- James Donnelly
- Wilfrid Thomas
- Sam Jones
