= Robert Macklin =

Australian author and journalist (1941–2026)

- Born: Robert Victor Macklin; 1941 Brisbane, Queensland, Australia
- Died: 16 January 2026 (aged 84)
- Occupation: Author, journalist
- Education: Brisbane Grammar School; Australian National University
- Spouse: Wendy Macklin
- Children: 2

Website
- robertmacklin.com

Robert Victor Macklin (1941 – 16 January 2026) was an Australian author and journalist.

== Life and career ==
Robert Victor Macklin was born in Brisbane in 1941. He was educated at Ironside Primary School, Brisbane Grammar School and the Australian National University.

He began his writing career for The Courier-Mail in Brisbane, later moving to The Age in Melbourne, The Bulletin in Sydney and the Canberra Times in Canberra. In 1967 he became press secretary to the deputy prime minister, John McEwen, shortly before the death of Harold Holt, after which McEwen briefly became prime minister.

In 1974, while working in the Philippines at the Asian Development Bank, he began writing both fiction and non-fiction books, beginning with the novel The Queenslander. Awarded a Commonwealth Writer's Fellowship, he returned to Australia in 1975 and wrote The Paper Castle (1978) and Juryman (1980), adapted by MGM to the film Storyville (1994) starring James Spader and Jason Robards.

His non-fiction work includes Seven Cities of Australia, Dark Paradise, Norfolk Island: Isolation, Savagery, Murder, 100 Great Australians, The Secret Life of Jesus, Jacka VC: Australian Hero, Fire in the Blood: The epic tale of Frank Gardiner and Australia's other bushrangers, Bravest: How Some of Australia's Greatest War Heroes Won Their Medals, the memoir War Babies, Kevin Rudd: The Biography, My Favourite Teacher, The Great Australian Pie, One False Move, SAS Sniper (with Rob Maylor), Redback One, SAS Insider, Warrior Elite, Hamilton Hume - Our Greatest Explorer and Dragon & Kangaroo.

With Peter Thompson he co-authored The Battle of Brisbane, The Man Who Died Twice: The Life and Adventures of Morrison of China, Kill The Tiger, Keep Off the Skyline and The Big Fella: The Rise and Rise of BHP Billiton.

He was a graduate of the screen writing course of the Australian Film, Television and Radio School and wrote and directed documentary films in 32 countries of Asia and the South Pacific. With producer Andrew Pike he wrote the screenplay Barefoot on Australia's only Chinese bushranger, Sam Poo.

Married to Wendy Macklin, a well-known Canberra primary school teacher, he had two sons. He divided his time between Canberra and Tuross Head. He died on 16 January 2026 at the age of 84. He had opted for voluntary assisted dying after eight years of chronic obstructive pulmonary disease.

== Awards ==
Macklin's awards included the Blake Dawson Prize for Business Literature (with Peter Thompson) in 2009 and Canberra Critics Circle awards for One False Move, Dark Paradise and Hamilton Hume - Our Greatest Explorer.

== Works ==
- The Queenslander (Corgi, 1978)
- The Paper Castle (Collins, 1977)
- Juryman (1982)
- 100 Great Australians (Currey O'Neil, 1983)
- The Secret Life of Jesus (Pan Books, 1990)
- War Babies, A Memoir (Pandanus Books ANU, 2004)
- Fire in the Blood: The Epic Tale of Frank Gardiner and Australia's Other Bushrangers (2005)
- Jacka VC: Australian Hero (2006)
- Kevin Rudd - the biography (2007)
- Bravest: How Some of Australia's Greatest War Heroes Won Their Medals (2008)
- SAS Sniper With Rob Maylor (Hachette 2010)
- Dark Paradise - Norfolk Island - Isolation, Savagery, Mystery and Murder (Hachette, 2013)
- Redback One (Hachette 2014)
- SAS Insider (Hachette 2014)
- Warrior Elite - Z Force to the SAS; Intelligence Operations to Cyber Warfare (Hachette, 2015)
- Hamilton Hume - Our Greatest Explorer (Hachette 2016)
- Dragon & Kangaroo: Australia and China's shared history from the goldfields to the present day (2017)
- Castaway - the extraordinary survival story of Narcisse Pelletier, a young French cabin boy shipwrecked on Cape York in 1858 (Hachette, 2019)
- The Man Who Planted Canberra: Charles Weston and His Three Million Trees (National Library of Australia, 2025)

With Peter Thompson

- The Battle of Brisbane (2000)
- Morrison of China (2005)
- Kill the Tiger (2002, 2005)
- Keep off the Skyline (2004)
- The Big Fella - the rise and rise of BHP Billiton (2009)
- Operation Rimau (Hachette, 2015)
