= Outlawry Under the Gums =

- Wireless Weekly 2 Feb 1934
- Genre: drama series
- Running time: 30 mins (9:30 pm – 10:00 pm)
- Country of origin: Australia
- Language: English
- Home station: 2SM
- Written by: John Pickard
- Produced by: John Pickard
- Original release: 8 November 1933 – 18 July 1934
- No. of series: 1
- No. of episodes: 36 (est.)
- Sponsored by: Chateau Tanunda. Wines

Outlawry Under the Gums is a 1933 Australian radio series about bushrangers. It ran until 1934 and was produced by John Pickard.

The show was broadcast again in 1938.

Copies of the scripts are at the Pickard and Provo (John and Frank) papers at the University of California.

== Premise ==
According to advertising "Dealing as they will with one of the most colorful phases of Australian History — the era of those wild and dangerous but withal picturesque, ruffians who took to the Australian bush and became a race apart from civilised society — the Series will carry to listeners a vivid mental picture of the rare charm and the peculiar, lure of the Australian country-side; the rugged life of men and women under the gums; their rollicking ballads, their camp-fire yarns, their quaint bush lore; and most of all the stark drama of their struggles against the .bushranging outlaws who came, as fire and drought and flood, like evil, things from the Buslilands to prey upon them in their pioneering efforts."

== Episodes ==
1. 8 November 1933 - "The Kelly Gang, or The Gentlemen of Strathlogie" - Part one of seven
2. 15 November 1933 - Ned Kelly part two
3. 22 November 1933 - Ned Kelly part three
4. 29 November 1933 - Ned Kelly part four
5. 6 December 1933 - Ned Kelly part five
6. 13 December 1933 - Ned Kelly part six
7. 20 December 1933 - Ned Kelly part seven
8. 27 December 1933
9. 3 January 1934
10. 10 January 1934
11. 17 January 1934
12. 24 January 1934
13. 31 January 1934
14. 7 February 1934
15. 14 February 1934
16. 21 February 1934
17. 28 February 1934
18. 7 March 1934
19. 14 March 1934
20. 21 March 1934
21. 28 March 1934 - Thunderbolt part one
22. 4 April 1934 - "Thunderbolt" - part two
23. 11 April 1934 - Thunderbolt part three
24. 18 April 1934 - Thunderbolt part four
25. 25 April 1934
26. 2 May 1934
27. 9 May 1934 - The Governor Brothers was scheduled but was replaced by one on Frank Gardiner out of fear of offending Aboriginal Australians
28. 16 May 1934 - Frank Gardiner part two
29. 23 May 1934 - Frank Gardiner part three
30. 30 May 1934 - Frank Gardiner part four
31. 6 June 1934 - final episode on Frank Gardiner
32. 13 June 1934
33. 20 June 1934
34. 27 June 1934
35. 4 July 1934
36. 11 July 1934
37. 18 July 1934

=== Other subjects ===
- "Mad Dog Morgan" - part one to three
- Sam Poo
- "Captain Moonlite, or From Lay Preacher to Bushranger"
- "Ben Hall, or The Outlaws of the Weddin Range" - part one to six
- "The Clarke Brothers" - part one to four
- Captain Melville
- "Martin Cash & Co."
- John Donne
