= James Nesbitt (bushranger) =

Australian bushranger (1858–1879)

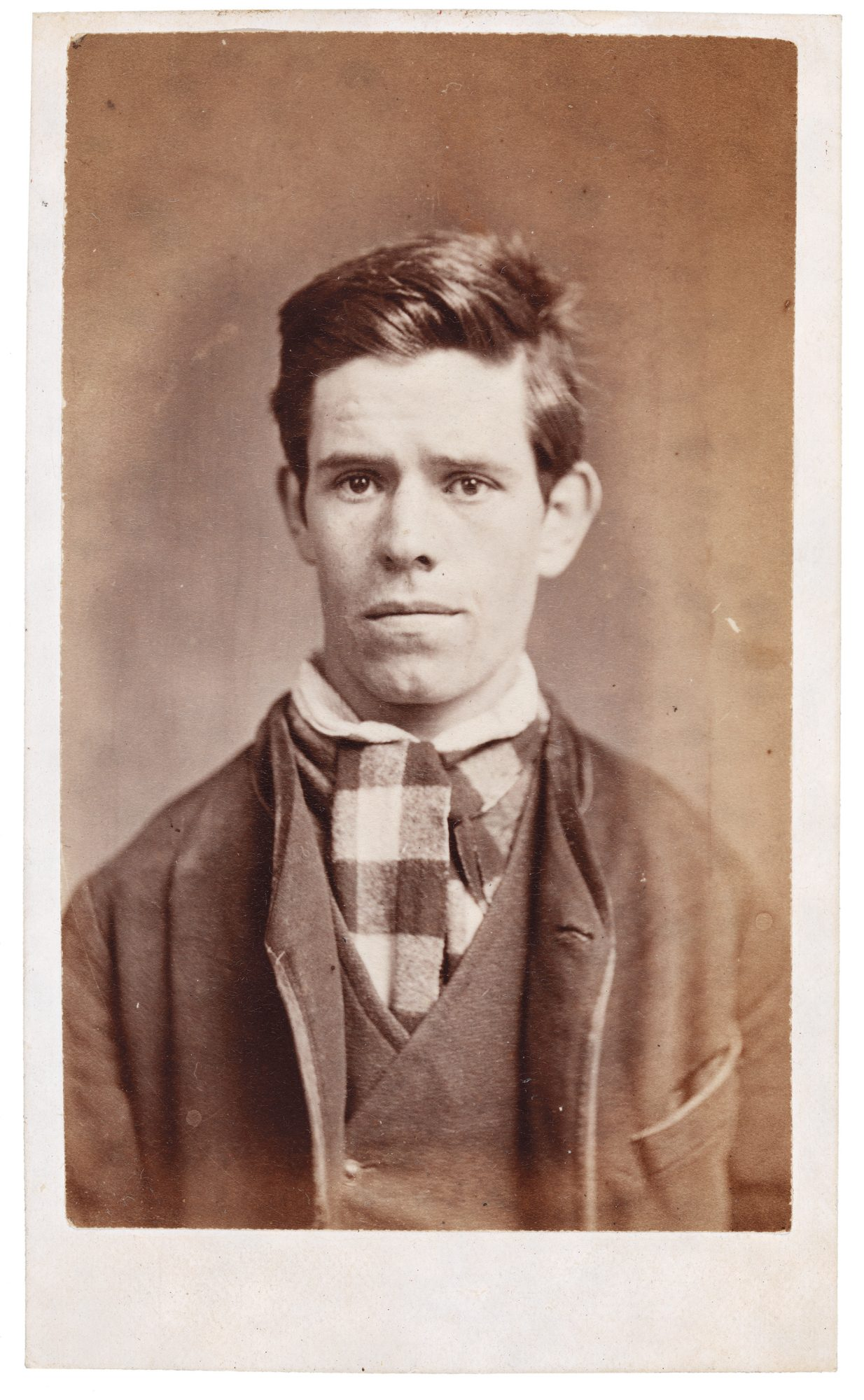
- Born: 27 August 1858
- Died: 17 November 1879 (aged 21)
- Resting place: Gundagai

James Nesbitt (27 August 1858 – 17 November 1879) was an Australian bushranger who was a member of the Wantabadgery Bushrangers led by Andrew George Scott, alias Captain Moonlite.

== Meeting Andrew George Scott ==
It is possible that Nesbitt was romantically involved with Andrew George Scott, the leader of the Wantabadgery Bushrangers.

Nesbitt met Scott while both were serving time in Pentridge Prison. Growing up in a poor household with an abusive father, Nesbitt turned to crime at a young age and had been in and out of jail for petty theft since he was a teenager. Little is known about their relationship in Pentridge except that a day was added to Nesbitt’s sentence for ‘taking tea to Prisoner Scott’. Scott was released from Pentridge after serving less than 7 years, his sentence being reduced from 10 for good behaviour. Nesbitt, who had been released a year before, waited for him at the gates. Together they moved into a rundown boarding house in Fitzroy.

== The Wantabadgery Bushrangers ==
In late October 1879, Andrew George Scott led a group of men out of Melbourne looking for work. This group included Nesbitt, 19-year-old Frank Johns, 22-year-old ex-con Thomas Rogan and young 15-year-old Augustus Warnecke. Later 18-year-old Graham Bennet joined their group. When no work was to be found, hunger and desperation got the better of them and they held up Wantabadgery Station, earning them the reputation as the Wantabadgery Bushrangers.

While they were holed up in the farmhouse of Edmund McGlede, the police found them, leading to a gunfight. Nesbitt was shot in the head. It was reported that Scott pulled Nesbitt into his arms and held him as he died, sobbing uncontrollably. Augustus Warnecke also died in the gunfight at the McGlede farm. One police officer, Constable Bowen, was mortally wounded in the gunfight; it is unknown who shot him but forensic evidence suggests it was not Scott or Nesbitt.
