= Borumba Dam Pumped Hydro Power Station =

Proposed pumped hydro energy storage system at Lake Borumba, Australia

The Borumba Dam Pumped Hydro Power Station is a proposed 2 GW / 48 GWh pumped hydro energy storage system at Lake Borumba, located in Imbil, south-west of Gympie in Queensland, Australia. First power is expected in 2033. A state-owned entity called Queensland Hydro is coordinating the project.

The land for the pumped hydro scheme was purchased by the Bjelke-Petersen state government following a Cabinet decision in August 1985. Plans for the scheme were announced in September 2022. The project is expected to cost $14.2 billion. Borumba Dam will be expanded for the project: a new higher dam wall is to be constructed downstream, close to the current dam. A second reservoir (31 gigalitres) is needed to be constructed at 200 m higher altitude than Borumba Dam.

A public consultation period is being undertaken from 14 February until 10 March 2025.

== See also ==
- List of pumped-storage hydroelectric power stations
- Renewable energy in Australia
