= CopperString =

CopperString is a proposed electricity connection between Townsville in North Queensland to Mount Isa in North-West Queensland, Australia. It will be approximately 840 to 1,000 kilometres (520 to 620 mi) long. It is expected to pass through the towns of Charters Towers, Pentland, Hughenden, Richmond, Julia Creek, and Cloncurry. It is a project of the Queensland Government to improve the affordability and availability of electricity in North and North-West Queensland. The eastern section (up to Hughenden) is expected to be completed by 2032, with the western section to Cloncurry and Mount Isa expected to be completed at a later date.

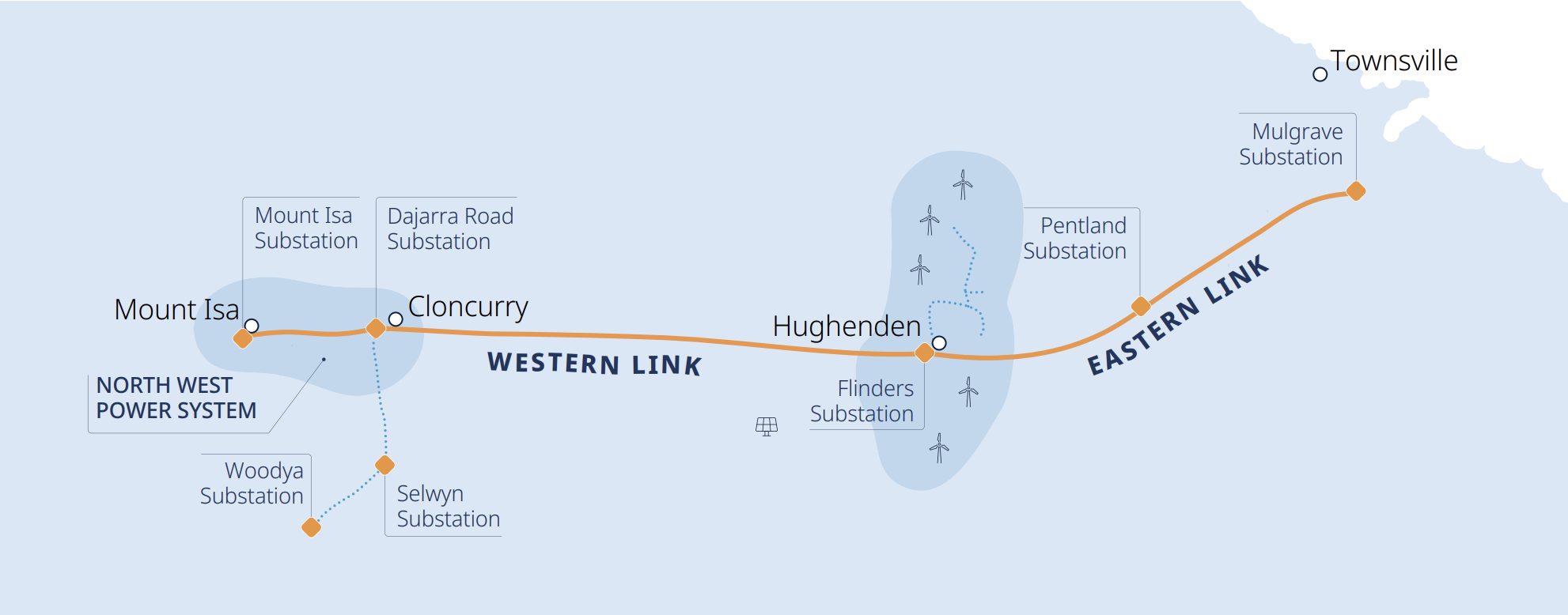
Map of the proposed CopperString electricity connection between Townsville and Mount Isa
