= Birriwa, New South Wales =

Birriwa
- Town
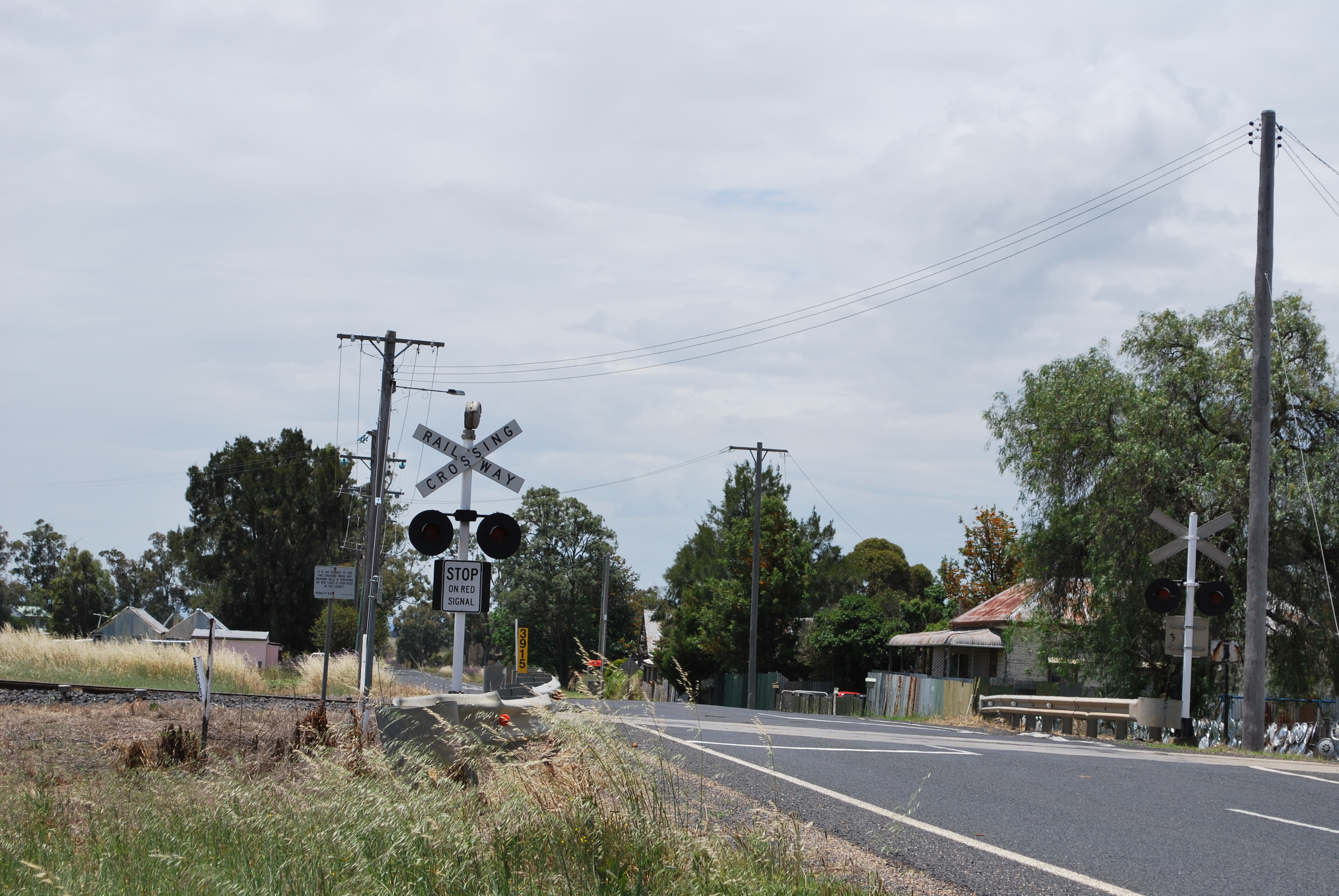
- Level crossing at Birriwa

- Coordinates: 32°07′13″S 149°28′01″E
- Country: Australia
- State: New South Wales
- LGA: Mid-Western Regional Council
- Location: 329 km (204 mi) NW of Sydney; 109 km (68 mi) E of Dubbo; 32 km (20 mi) N of Gulgong; 19 km (12 mi) S of Dunedoo

Government
  - State electorate: Orange
  - Federal division: Parkes

Population
  - Total: 45 (SAL 2021)
- Postcode: 2844

Birriwa is a locality in central New South Wales, Australia.

Birriwa is located on the Castlereagh Highway in the central west of New South Wales between Gulgong and Dunedoo.

The Gwabegar railway line came to Birriwa and a station was opened there in 1909. There is no longer a passenger service, but a large grain silo remains in operation where the railway line crosses the Castlereagh Highway at a level crossing.

The Chinese bushranger Sam Poo shot and killed policeman John Ward at Birriwa in 1865.
