= Captain Moonlite =

Australian bushranger (1842–1880)

Captain Moonlight
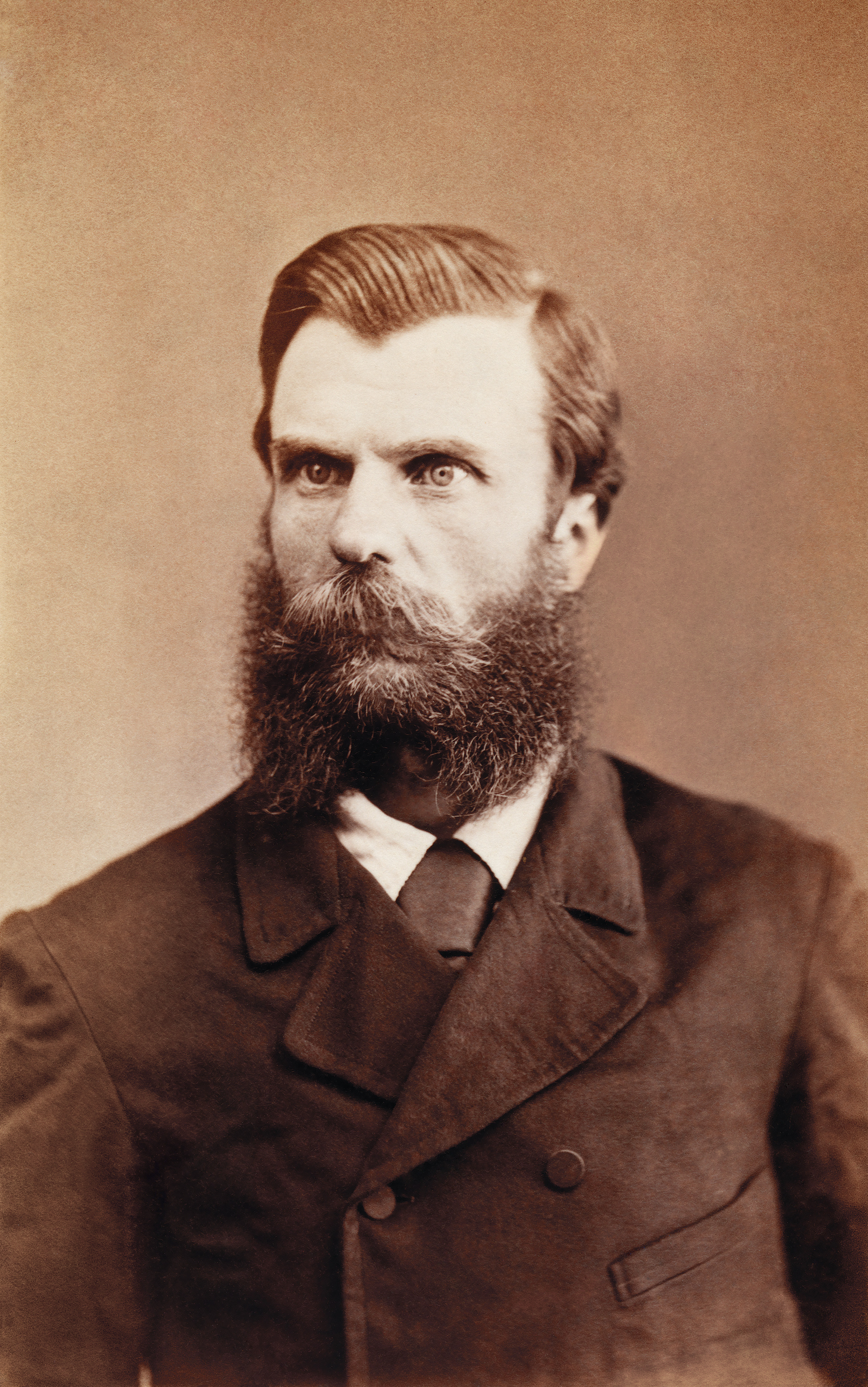
- Scott c. 1879
- Born: Andrew George Scott; 5 July 1842; Rathfriland, Ireland
- Died: 20 January 1880 (aged 38); Sydney, Australia
- Resting place: Gundagai
- Other names: Alexander Charles Scott; Captain Moonlight
- Occupations: Bushranger; public speaker; gold digger; bank robber; combatant
- Status: Executed by hanging
- Conviction: Murder
- Penalty: Death
- Accomplice: James Nesbitt

Andrew George Scott (5 July 1842 – 20 January 1880), also known as Captain Moonlite, though also referred to as Alexander Charles Scott and Captain Moonlight, was an Irish-born New Zealand immigrant to the Colony of Victoria, a bushranger there and in the Colony of New South Wales, and an eventual and current day Australian folk figure.

== Early life ==
Scott was born in Rathfriland, Ireland, son of Thomas Scott, an Anglican clergyman and Bessie Jeffares. His father's intention was that he join the priesthood, but Scott instead trained to be an engineer, completing his studies in London.

The family moved to New Zealand in 1861, with Scott intending to try his luck in the Otago goldfields. However, the New Zealand Wars intervened and Scott signed up as an officer and fought at the battle of Orakau where he was wounded in both legs. After a long convalescence Scott was accused of malingering, and court-martialed. He gave his disquiet at the slaughter of women and children during the siege as the source of his objection to returning to service.

In Melbourne, he met Bishop Charles Perry and, in 1868, he was appointed lay reader at Bacchus Marsh, Victoria, with the intention of entering the Anglican priesthood on the completion of his service. He was then sent to the gold mining town of Mount Egerton.

== Bushranging ==
On 8 May 1869, Scott was accused of disguising himself and forcing bank agent Ludwig Julius Wilhelm Bruun, a young man whom he had befriended, to open the safe. Bruun described being robbed by a fantastic black-crepe masked figure who forced him to sign a note absolving him of any role in the crime. The note read "I hereby certify that L.W. Bruun has done everything within his power to withstand this intrusion and the taking of money which was done with firearms, Captain Moonlite, Sworn." After this he went to the Maitland district, near Newcastle and was there convicted on two charges of obtaining money by false pretences for which he was sentenced to twelve and eighteen months' imprisonment. Of these concurrent terms, Scott served fifteen months, at the expiration of which time he returned to Sydney where, in March 1872, he was arrested on the charge of robbing the London Chartered Bank of Australia in Egerton and forwarded to Ballarat for examination and trial.

He succeeded in escaping jail by cutting a hole through the wall of his cell and gained entrance into the adjoining cell, which was occupied by another prisoner, who was as desirous of escaping as himself. Together they seized the warder when he came on his rounds, gagged him and tied him up. Making use of his keys, they proceeded to other cells, liberating four other prisoners, and the six men succeeded in escaping over the wall by means of blankets cut into strips, which they used as a rope. Scott was subsequently re-captured, and held safely until his trial. In July he was tried before judge Sir Redmond Barry at the Ballarat Circuit Court when, by a series of cross-examinations of unprecedented length conducted by himself after rejecting his counsel, he spread the case over no less than eight days, but was at last convicted, and sentenced to 10 years' hard labour. Despite some evidence against him, Scott claimed innocence in this matter until his dying day.

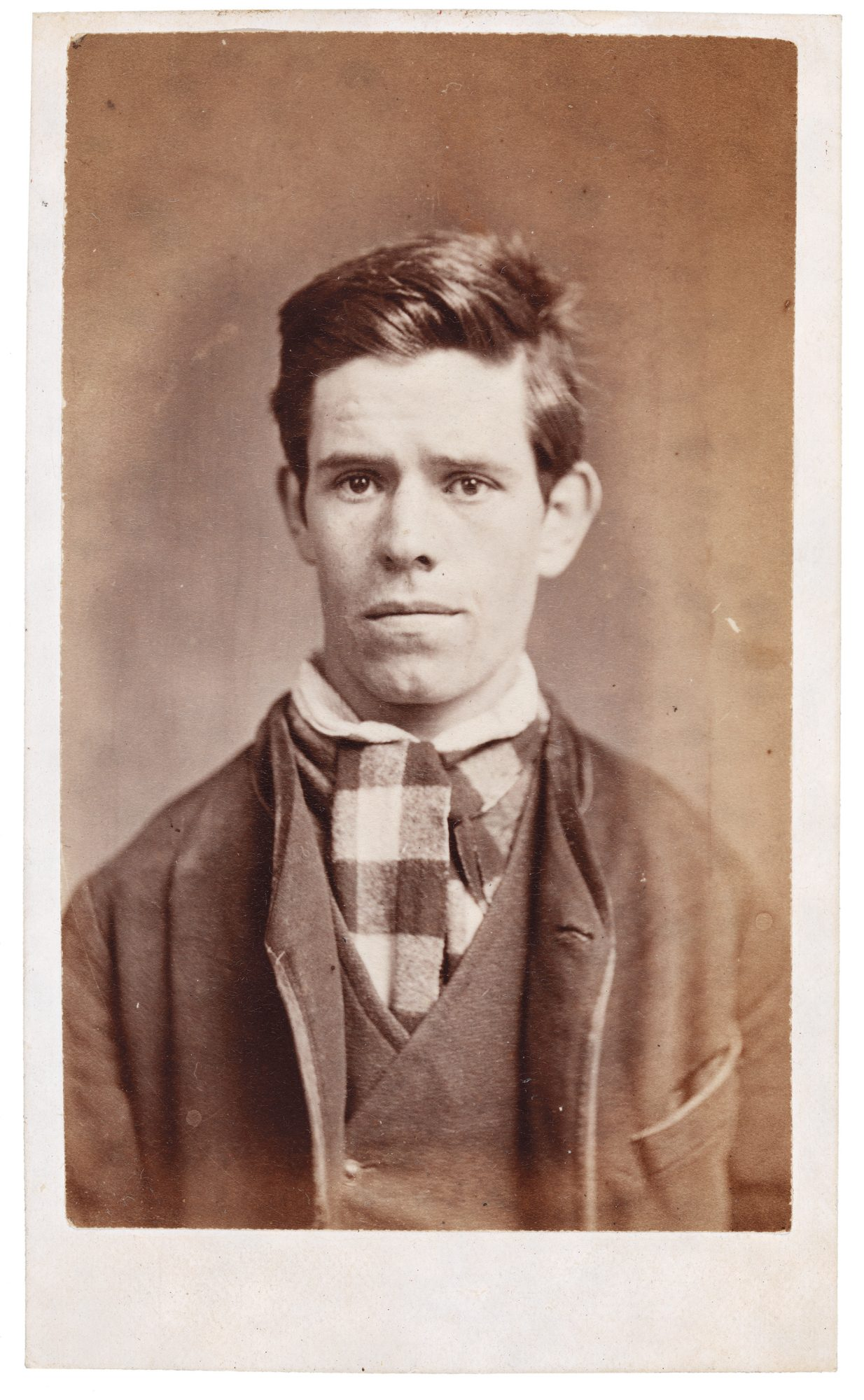
James Nesbitt

Scott only served two-thirds of his sentence of 10 years, was released from HM Prison Pentridge in March 1879 and after his release he made a few pounds by lecturing on the enormities of Pentridge Gaol. On regaining freedom, Scott met up with James Nesbitt, a young man whom he had met in prison. While some disagree on the grounds of speculation, he is considered by many to be Scott's lover and there is a significant primary source evidence that supports this reading. Scott's handwritten letters, currently held in the Archives Office of NSW, profess this love. While it is difficult to definitively claim the exact nature of Scott and Nesbitt's sexual practices, it can certainly be said that their relationship was an overtly romantic one. With the aid of Nesbitt, Captain Moonlite began a career as a public speaker on prison reform trading on his tabloid celebrity.

However this reputation came back to bite him. Throughout this period Scott was harried by the authorities and by the tabloid press who attempted to link him to numerous crimes in the colony and printed fantastic rumours about supposed plots he had underway.

At some time during this period Scott seems to have decided to live up to this legend and assembled a gang of young men, with Nesbitt as his second in command and the others being Thomas Rogan (21), Thomas Williams (19), Gus Wreneckie (15) and Graham Bennet (18). Scott met these young men through his lecture tours.

The gang commenced their careers as bushrangers near Mansfield, in Victoria. While travelling through the Kellys' area of operation, the gang were frequently mistaken for The Kelly Gang and took advantage of this to receive food and to seize guns and ammunition from homesteads. Inspecting Superintendent of Police John Sadleir claimed that Scott sent word to infamous bushranger and outlaw Ned Kelly, asking to join forces with him but Kelly sent back word threatening that if Scott or his band approached him he would shoot them down. Scott and his gang left Victoria in the later part of 1879, after operating there for a short time. They travelled north across the border into New South Wales to look for work, far from the police surveillance that stymied any opportunity of employment in Victoria. It was in the southern district of the New South Wales colony that they entered upon the full practice of their profession.

In one act they made themselves notorious. On Saturday evening, 15 November 1879 they entered the little settlement of Wantabadgery, about 45 km (28 miles) from Gundagai, and proceeded to "bail up" (confine and rob) all the residents.

== Capture ==
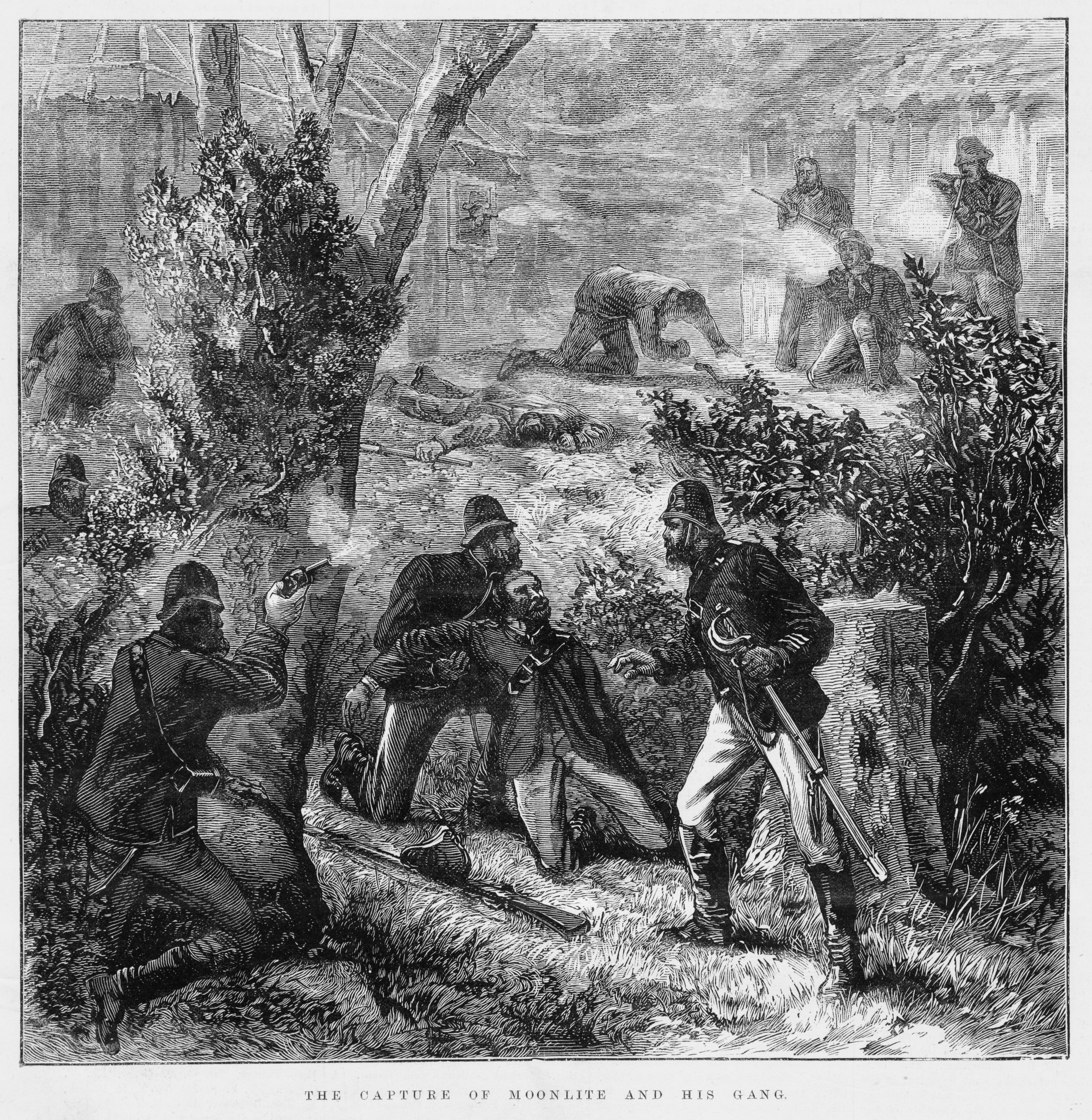
Capture of Captain Moonlite

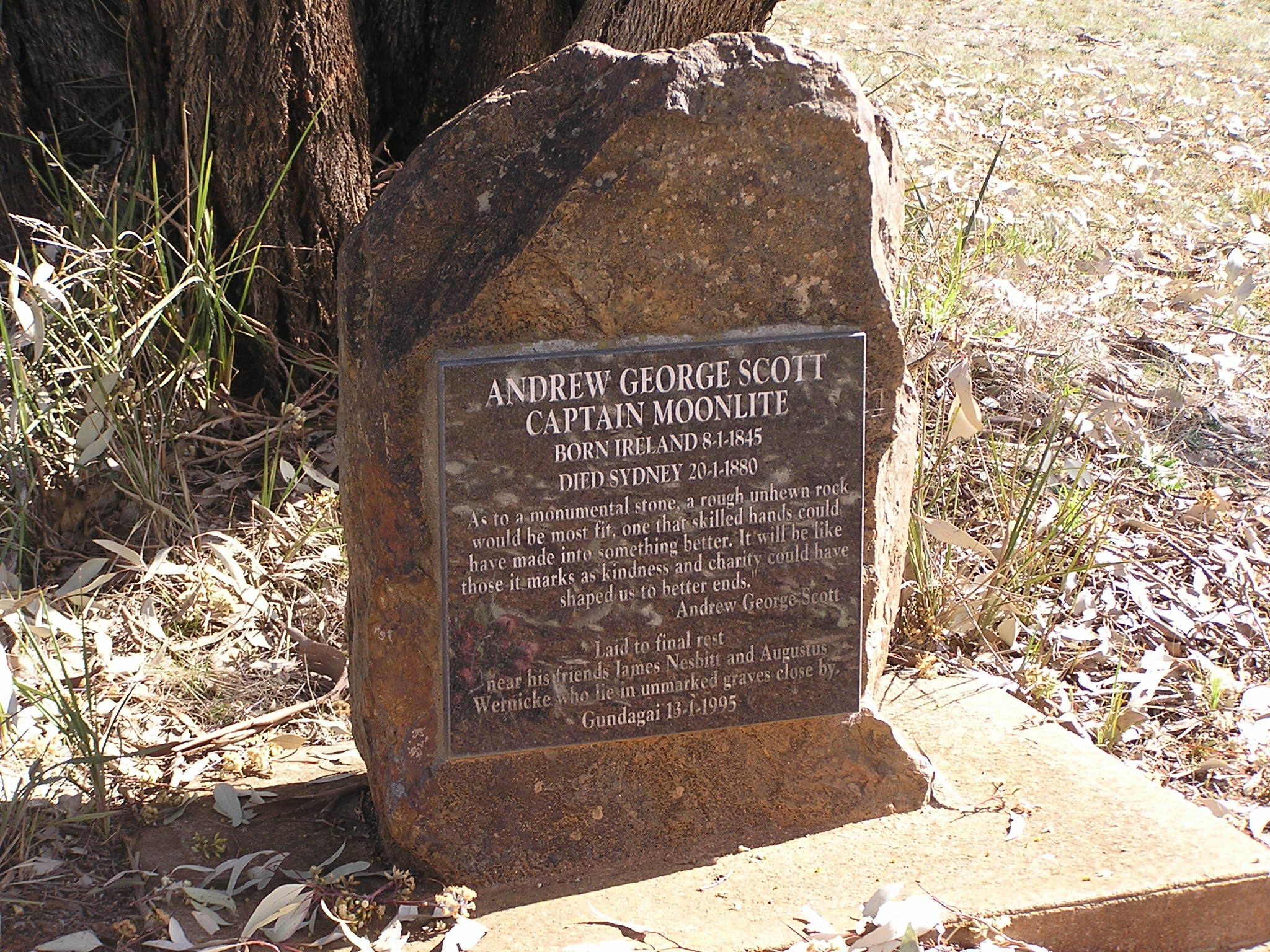
Headstone at Gundagai cemetery

Scott's gang held up the Wantabadgery Station near Wagga Wagga on 15 November 1879 after being refused work, shelter and food. By this stage they were on the verge of starvation, after spending cold and rainy nights in the bush and in Moonlite's words succumbed to "desperation", terrorising staff and the family of Claude McDonald, the station owner. Scott also robbed the Australian Arms Hotel of a large quantity of alcohol and took prisoner the residents of some other neighbouring properties- bringing the number of prisoners to 25 in total. One man, Ruskin, escaped in an attempt to warn others, but was caught and subject to a mock trial, the jury of his fellow prisoners finding him "not guilty". Another station-hand attempted to rush Scott but was overpowered.

A small party of four mounted troopers eventually arrived, but Scott's well armed gang captured their horses and held them down with gunfire for several hours until they retreated to gather reinforcements – at which point the gang slipped out. The gang then holed up in the farmhouse of Edmund McGlede until surrounded by a reinforcement of five extra troopers led by Sergeant Carroll.

As the boy Wreneckie was running from a fence to reach a better position, he was shot through the side, paralyzed from the waist down and mortally wounded. The police gradually advanced from tree to tree, and drove the remaining desperadoes into a detached back kitchen. Carroll led an assault upon the kitchen, and in this rally Constable Edward Webb-Bowen was fatally wounded, a bullet from one of the gang members entering his neck, and lodging near the spine. Recent investigation pointed to Wreneckie being the likely shooter while on the ground to Webb-Bowen's left, hitting him in the neck with a Colt revolver.

Nesbitt was also shot and killed, attempting to lead police away from the house so that Scott could escape. When Scott saw Nesbitt shot down and was distracted, McGlede took the opportunity to disarm the gang leader and with the other members wounded, or captured on attempting to flee, the fire fight came to a close. Rogan succeeded in escaping, but was found next day under a bed in McGlede's house. According to newspaper reports at the time, Scott openly wept at the loss of his dearest and closest companion. As Nesbitt lay dying, 'his leader wept over him like a child, laid his head upon his breast, and kissed him passionately'.

== Trial and execution ==
Scott was accused of firing the bullet that struck Webb-Bowen, which he denied. Witnesses confirmed that Scott was armed with a sniper rifle and the policeman had died from a bullet fired by a Colt's pistol. It was never discovered who used that weapon in the firefight, policeman or civilian, and it was not found afterwards. Scott was found guilty despite deflecting as much blame for the robbery from his companions as possible and the jury recommended mercy for three of them.

Scott and Rogan were hanged together in Sydney at Darlinghurst Gaol at 8 o'clock on 20 January 1880, on Scott's father's birthday. While awaiting his hanging Scott wrote a series of death-cell letters which were discovered by historian Garry Wotherspoon. Scott went to the gallows wearing a ring woven from a lock of Nesbitt's hair on his finger and his final request was to be buried in the same grave as his constant companion, "My dying wish is to be buried beside my beloved James Nesbitt, the man with whom I was united by every tie which could bind human friendship, we were one in hopes, in heart and soul and this unity lasted until he died in my arms." His request was not granted by the authorities of the time, but in January 1995, his remains were exhumed from Rookwood Cemetery in Sydney and reinterred at Gundagai next to Nesbitt's grave.

== In popular culture ==
His life was dramatised in:

- the 1906 stage play Captain Moonlite
- the 1910 film Moonlite
- the radio series Outlawry Under the Gums (1933)
- A fictionalised Moonlite appears in the short-lived television series Wild Boys, played by New Zealand-Australian actor Aaron Jeffery.

Also noted in the 1992 film Far and Away

In October 2017, the Australasian History television channel broadcast an episode about Captain Moonlite, showing evidence that Scott did not shoot Webb-Bowen, but that Wreneckie did.

A musical based on the death cell letters of A.G.Scott called Captain Moonlite was written by Australian Musical Theatre Composer, Jye Bryant in 2019 and premiered at Redcliffe Musical Theatre in August 2020 with follow-up seasons by Richmond Players Inc in 2023, Liverpool Performing Arts Ensemble in 2024 and Melville Theatre Company in 2026. Another musical based on Scott's life (also called "Captain Moonlite") was made by Gabriel Bergmoser with music by Dan Nixon. It was performed for the 2018 Midsumma Festival.

Visual Artist Todd Fuller's animation 'with whom I was united by every tie' centres around Captain Moonlight and was exhibited in the Sulman Prize, 2019.

The Zest Is History covered Captain Moonlite’s story in Season 1 Episode 11, in August 2020.

Moonlite is a secular oratorio for voices, percussion and viola, by composer Wally Gunn to lyrics by Maria Zajkowski. It was premiered by Variant 6, voices and Mobius Percussion in New York on 17 May 2019 and received its Australian premiere at the Fitzroy Town Hall on 26 July 2025.

== Folklore ==
There are references to Captain Moonlite having preached in towns including Bacchus Marsh, at this time he was acting as a lay preacher and there are references of him signing "religious books". These stories have been passed down through the generations. He was known to frequent the area of Blackwood and surrounds. On the way to Blackwood from Melbourne visitors pass the "Half built church" the tales go on to state that it was Captain Moonlite who stole the funds that were to be used to complete the building and therefore remains as a half built church as the population and funding declined. The half church still stands today.
