= Ballimore =

- Town
- Coordinates: 32°11′42″S 148°53′49″E
- Country: Australia
- State: New South Wales
- LGA: Dubbo Regional Council
- Location: 377 km (234 mi) NW of Sydney; 31 km (19 mi) NE of Dubbo

Government
  - State electorate: Dubbo
  - Federal division: Parkes

Population
  - Total: 240 (2021 census)
- Postcode: 2830

Ballimore is a small village in the Orana region of New South Wales, Australia. The name also refers to the surrounding rural locality. In the 2021 census, it recorded a population of 240 people.

The area now known as Ballimore lies on the traditional lands of Wiradjuri people.

Ballimore is located about 31 kilometres (19 mi) east of Dubbo on the Golden Highway. The village's site is located near the confluence of the Talbragar River and its tributary Ballimore Creek, being bordered on one side by the river and on another side by the Troy Junction–Merrygoen railway line. It was the construction of the railway, which led to the formation of the village. The village of Ballimore was proclaimed on 12 May 1916. Ballimore is likely named after the identically-named place in Argyll and Bute, Scotland.

From 1918 to 1975, Ballimore had a railway station. There is still a siding, silo, and grain loader there. The village also has a public school and a hotel.

There is a deposit of coal in the area, which has been mined in the past, beginning in the 1880s. The coal was suitable for steaming, but was not suitable for making town gas, and could not be used to make coke.

While boring to find coal, in 1887, a seam of coal was struck at a depth of 540 feet, but then artesian water was struck at a depth of 550 feet. The water was under enough pressure that it could flow in piping to around 30 feet above ground, at a rate of 1,000 gallons per hour. When the water was assessed, it was found to be high-quality mineral water. The predominating mineral content was sodium bicarbonate. From 1897, the source of mineral (soda) water was tapped, using deep bores in the area. It was sold under the brand name, 'Zetz-Spa', originally by the Zetz-Spa Proprietary Company and, from 1902, by Tooths.

An analysis of 'Zetz-Spa' naturally-effervesent mineral water, from 1902, gave the following values in grains per gallon: "Bicarbonate of soda, 287.901 grains per gallon; potash, 35.263 grains; lime, 18.604 grains; magnesia, 15.841 grains; iron, traces; manganese, traces; strontium, traces; lithium, traces; chloride of sodium, 7.012; sulphate of lime, 0.294; alumina, 0.112; siliceous substances, 1.0164."

In 1951, there were three mineral water bores; one operated by Tooths, another supplying Schwepps, and a third used for watering livestock. Tooth's continued to market 'Zetz-Spa' mineral water, until 1977.
