= Cobbora =

Village in New South Wales, Australia

Coordinates: 32°03′30″S 149°15′18″E

Cobbora is an almost defunct village in New South Wales, Australia. The name of the locality was also spelled Cobborah.

Cobbora was established where the original track from Mudgee to Mendooran crossed the Talbragar River. In the late 1800s, it had a police station and was considered to be the main locality on the Talbragar. Cobb & Co coaches travelled through Cobbora twice a week in 1876 to 1879. However, in 1910 the railway took a route via Dunedoo which bypassed Cobbora, and the village went into a terminal decline.

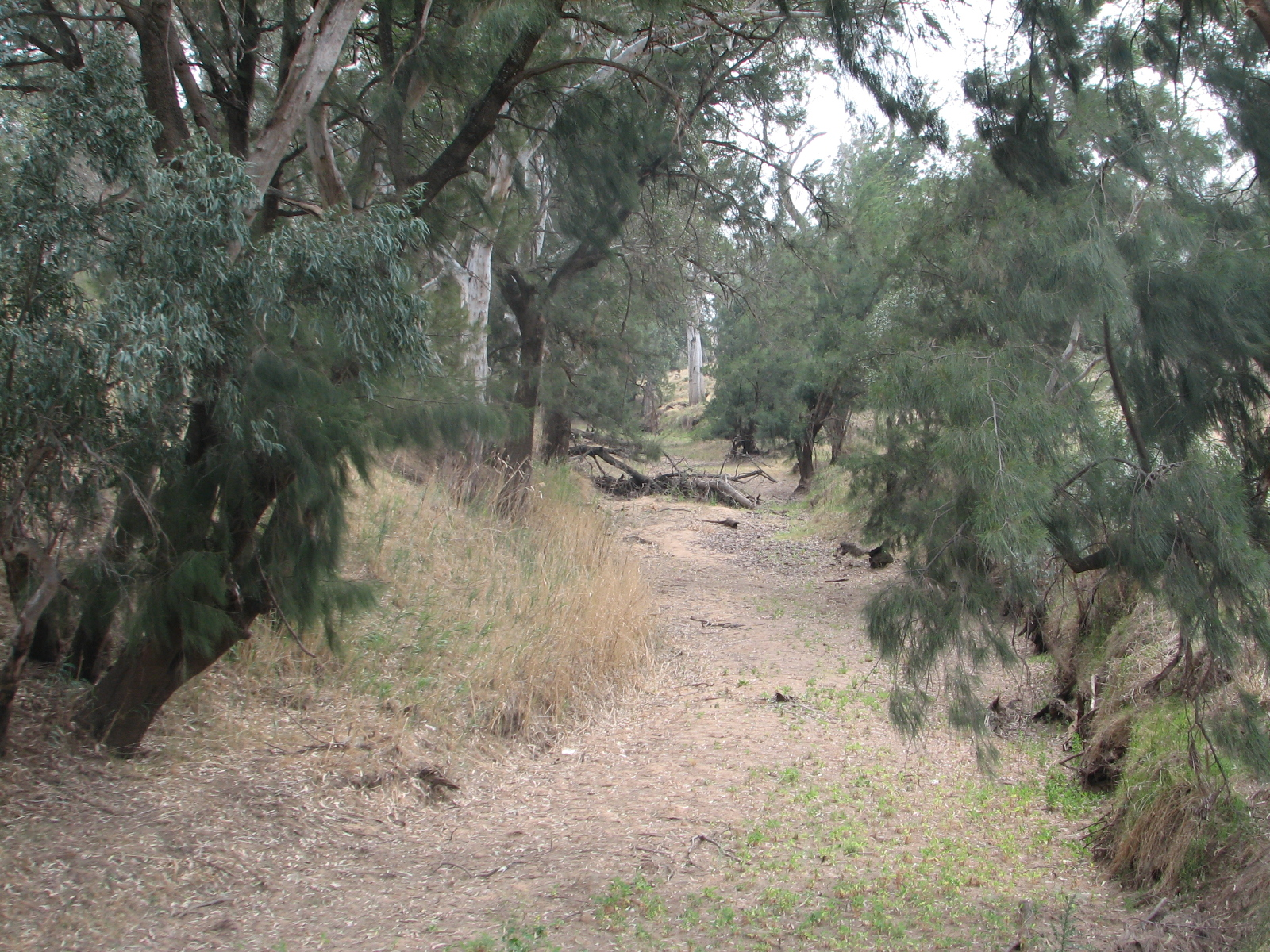
The Talbragar River at Cobbora

Cobbora is located adjacent to the Golden Highway about 15 kilometres west of Dunedoo.

Cobbora Shire was a former local government council area, which covered rural areas around Cobbora and Geurie with no significant towns. During a local government reorganisation, Cobbora Shire was abolished and parts of its area were added to several of the surrounding council areas.

== Planned coal mine ==
A coal mine is planned just outside the village of Cobbora.
