= Mendooran =

- Town
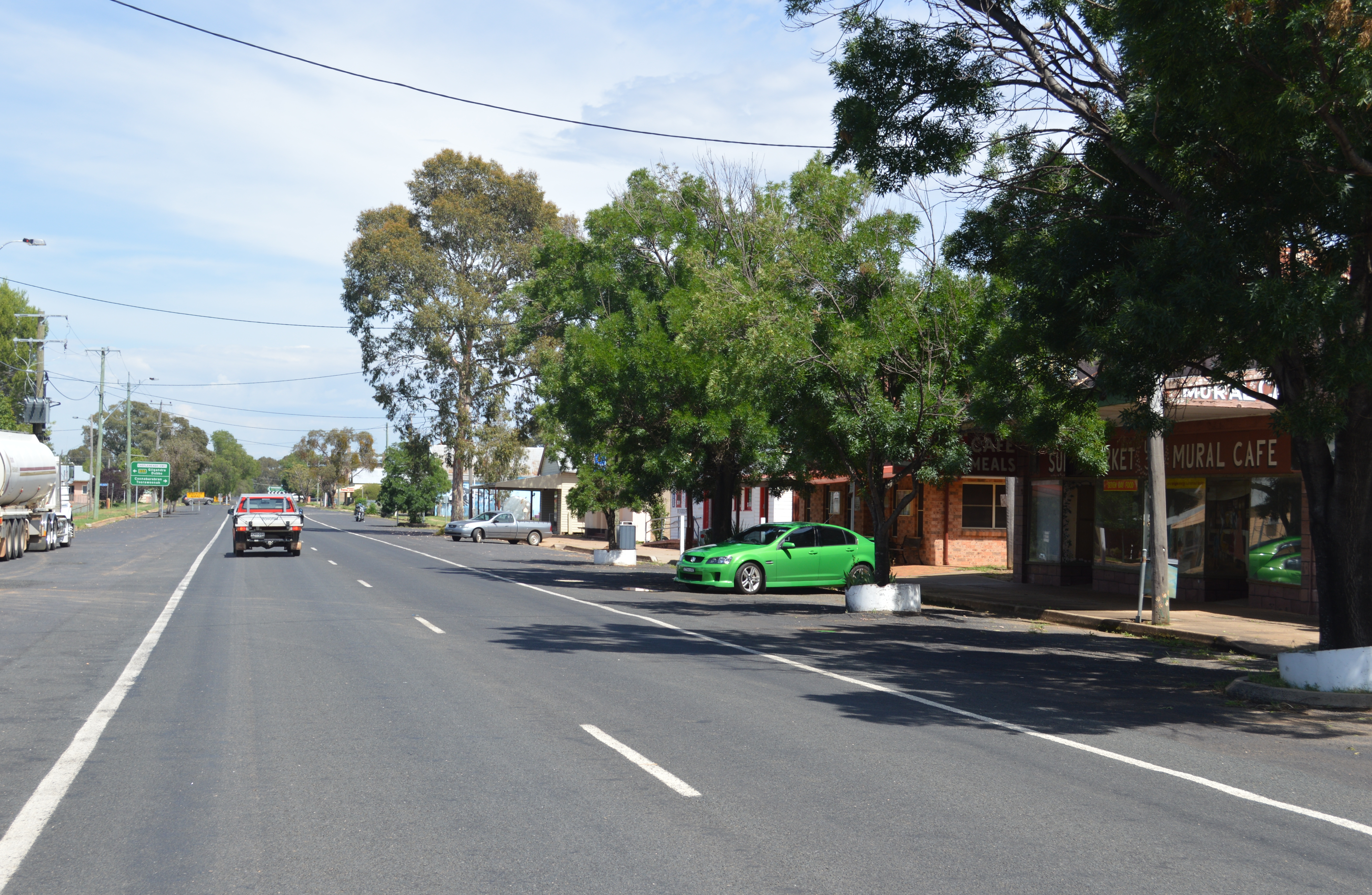
- Bandulla Street, the main street of Mendooran, 2017

- Coordinates: 31°48′S 149°07′E
- Country: Australia
- State: New South Wales
- LGA: Warrumbungle Shire
- Location: 75 km (47 mi) from Dubbo
- Established: 1834

Government
  - Federal division: Parkes

Population
  - Total: 275 (2021 census)
- Postcode: 2842

Mendooran (pronunciation: men-door-an) is a small town adjacent to the Castlereagh River in the Warrumbungle Shire of central western New South Wales, Australia. The town lies at an altitude of 271 metres above sea level, 348 kilometres west of Sydney, 75 kilometres from Dubbo and 71 kilometres southeast of Coonabarabran. At the 2021 census, Mendooran had a population of 275 people. The Castlereagh Highway also runs through the town, changing its name to Bandulla Street in the centre.

== History ==
The district was inhabited by the Wiradjuri tribe before white settlement. The first European to visit the area was surveyor John Evans who came as close as 10 kilometres from Mendooran in 1815. Two years later it was John Oxley's group that passed through the area while conducting one of the first inland expeditions. It is believed that the name derived from that of a local Aboriginal tribal leader named either "Mundo" or "Mundoo". Lucerne, wheat and sheep were established on the station in later years.

The small village grew in the 1860s on the old station near the bridge which passed over the Castlereagh River. As at 1866 there were 24 residents recorded in the area. The village was called Mundooran until the arrival of the railway around 1915 when the name was changed to Mendooran.

The John Bull Inn was erected to serve the passing traffic of the 1860s. A bridge was erected over the Castlereagh River in 1869 which increased the road traffic and contributed to local development. The town was laid out in 1881 with a school, police station and courthouse being built.

The Robertson Land Act of 1893 broke up the larger squatting runs and closer settlement then came about.

In February 2019 Mendooran was experiencing severe shortages of water and had been placed on level six water restrictions, the highest level of restrictions mandated in NSW.

Mendooran formerly had a rugby league team, the Mendooran Tigers, who competed in the Group 14 Rugby League competition.

The town is mentioned in Banjo Paterson's poem "The Travelling Post Office" (1894):

The roving breezes come and go, the reed beds sweep and sway,
The sleepy river murmurs low, and loiters on its way,
It is the land of lots o' time along the Castlereagh.
The old man's son had left the farm, he found it dull and slow,
He drifted to the great north-west where all the rovers go.
"He's gone so long," the old man said, "he's dropped right out of mind,
But if you'd write a line to him I'd take it very kind
He's shearing here and fencing there, a kind of waif and stray,
He's droving now with Conroy's sheep along the Castlereagh.
The sheep are travelling for the grass, and travelling very slow:
They may be at Mundooran now, or past the Overflow.

Today Mendooran (the spelling has changed since Paterson wrote the poem) is small and sleepy. It is a convenient stopover for people heading towards the Warrumbungles.

== Outdoor recreation ==
Since 2022, the Central West Bike Trail has become a popular activity that includes Mendooran as one of many local towns on the route.

The Central West Cycle trail links the major towns of Mudgee, Dubbo and Wellington and a handful of smaller ones including Gulgong, Dunedoo, Mendooran and Ballimore. The 400-kilometre loop has gained popularity among cyclists.

https://centralwestcycletrail.com.au/trail-description/

Accommodation in Mendooran is available but limited. As of 2025, accommodation options comprise a hotel, cottages, and a campground.

== Activities ==
Although a small country town, Mendooran operates less like a 'town' with large commercial hub, and more like a hamlet.

The Mendooran Races are held every September and attract crowds of over 500 people from surrounding towns. This influx of people brings benefits including increased patronage at the local Pub, Bowling Club and RSL, and also sees local accommodation providers benefit as well.

Mendooran hosts an annual Agricultural Show every year, the timing of which depends on which weekend is allocated by the NSW Show Society. Mendooran Annual Agricultural Show features equestrian events, pavilion, sheep and cattle, shearing display, tractor pull and novelty events for the adults and children including Iron Man or Woman and a tug-o-war.

Mendooran Show:

Showcasing a variety of equestrian events, pavilions, sheep and cattle displays, shearing demonstrations, tractor pulls, and entertaining novelty events for both adults and children—such as the Iron Man or Woman challenge and tug-of-war.

Mendooran Races:

Racing since 1856, including entertainment for the kids. Full bar and TAB facilities available on the day. Usually the first or second weekend in September.

Mendooran Art Preview:

The Mendooran Art Preview, held in October, offers a vibrant showcase of diverse artworks. Featuring local talents and captivating creations.

The nearby Castlereagh River offers opportunities for fishing for local species such as silverperch, yellow belly & catfish.
