= Toorawandi Parish (Napier County), New South Wales =

- Coordinates: 31°15′S 149°16′E
- Country: Australia
- State: New South Wales
- LGA: Warrumbungle Shire

Government
  - State electorate: Barwon
  - Federal division: Parkes
- Postcode: 2357
- Mean max temp: 23.7 °C (74.7 °F)
- Mean min temp: 7.4 °C (45.3 °F)
- Annual rainfall: 748.4 mm (29.46 in)

Toorawandi is a civil parish of Napier County in New South Wales.

The parish is on the junction of the Castlereagh River and Yallagal Creek and on the Ulamambri Creek. The only town of the parish is Ulamambri, New South Wales and the nearest main town is Coonabarabran.

The parish was on the now closed Gwabegar railway line with stations at Ulamambri, and Deringulla to the south.
