= Bungabah, New South Wales =

Bungabah is a civil parish of Napier County in New South Wales.

The parish is on the Gwabegar railway line, and the now closed Murrawal railway siding is in the parish.

Bungabah is on the Castlereagh River and the nearest town is Coonabarabran to the north.
