= Biamble, New South Wales =

Civil parish

Biamble is a civil parish of Napier County, New South Wales, that is located at 31°43′54″S 149°19′04″E. The civil parish is roughly equivalent to the rural locality of Neilrex in Warrumbungle Shire Council.

Biamble is on the Castlereagh River between Binnaway, New South Wales and Mendooran, New South Wales.

The Dubbo to Werris Creek railway line runs through the parish of Biamble and the former Neilrex station has now been removed, meaning the nearest freight station is now nearby Merrygoen and the nearest passenger service is Dubbo. Although the station has closed, the railway line remains part of the Intrastate Network managed by the Australian Rail Track Corporation.

== Notable people ==
- Gregory Macalister Mathews CBE FRSE FZS FLS (1876–1949), amateur ornithologist born in Biamble
