= Moorangoorang, New South Wales =

Moorangoorang is a rural locality and a civil parish of County of Napier in the central western part of New South Wales, Australia. The parish has three railway stations, Mooren, Borah and Pimbra.
