= Mendooran Parish, New South Wales =

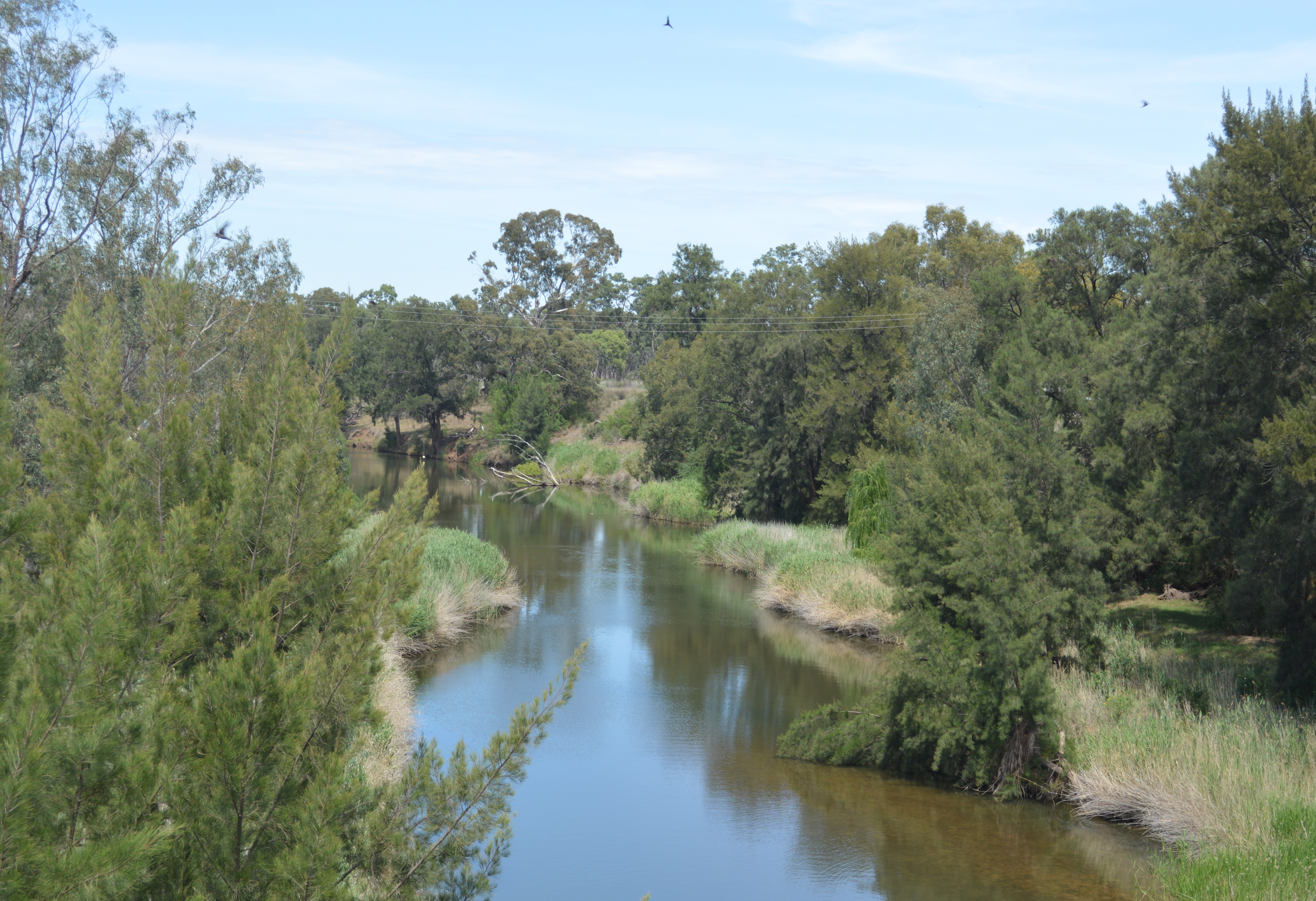
Castlereagh River, Mendooran Parish

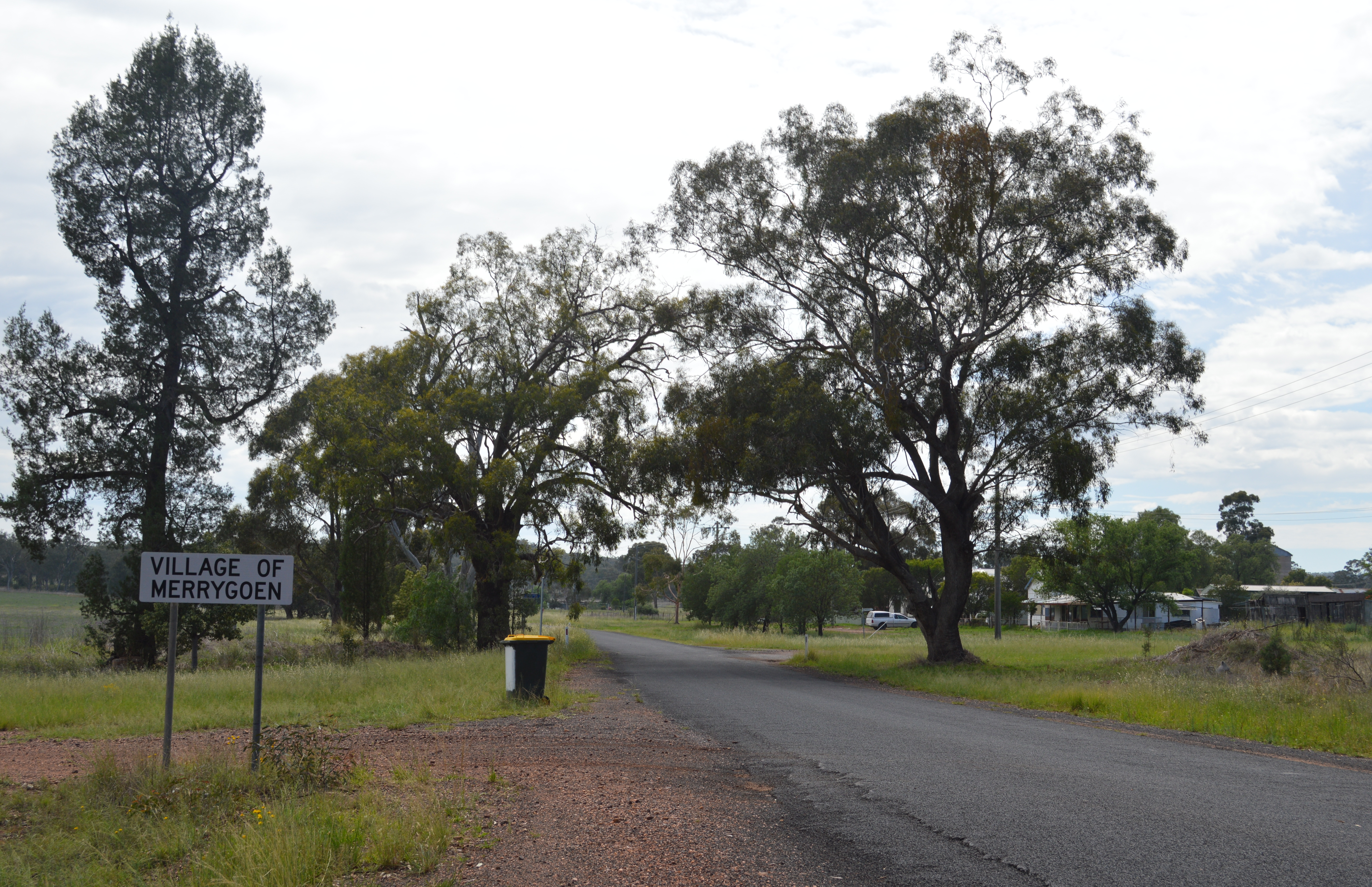
Merrygoen Town Entry Sign.

Mendooran Parish, New South Wales is a civil parish of Napier County, New South Wales.

The only towns of the parish are Mendooran, New South Wales and Merrygoen. The Parish is in the central western part of New South Wales, Australia, in Warrumbungle Shire.

On the northeastern side of the area is the Liverpool Range with the Coolah Tops National Park. Most of the region is agricultural with sheep and cattle raising and crops grown along the Talbragar River valley.

Mendooran Parish is on the Castlereagh River.
