= Binnaway Parish, New South Wales =

Binnaway Parish
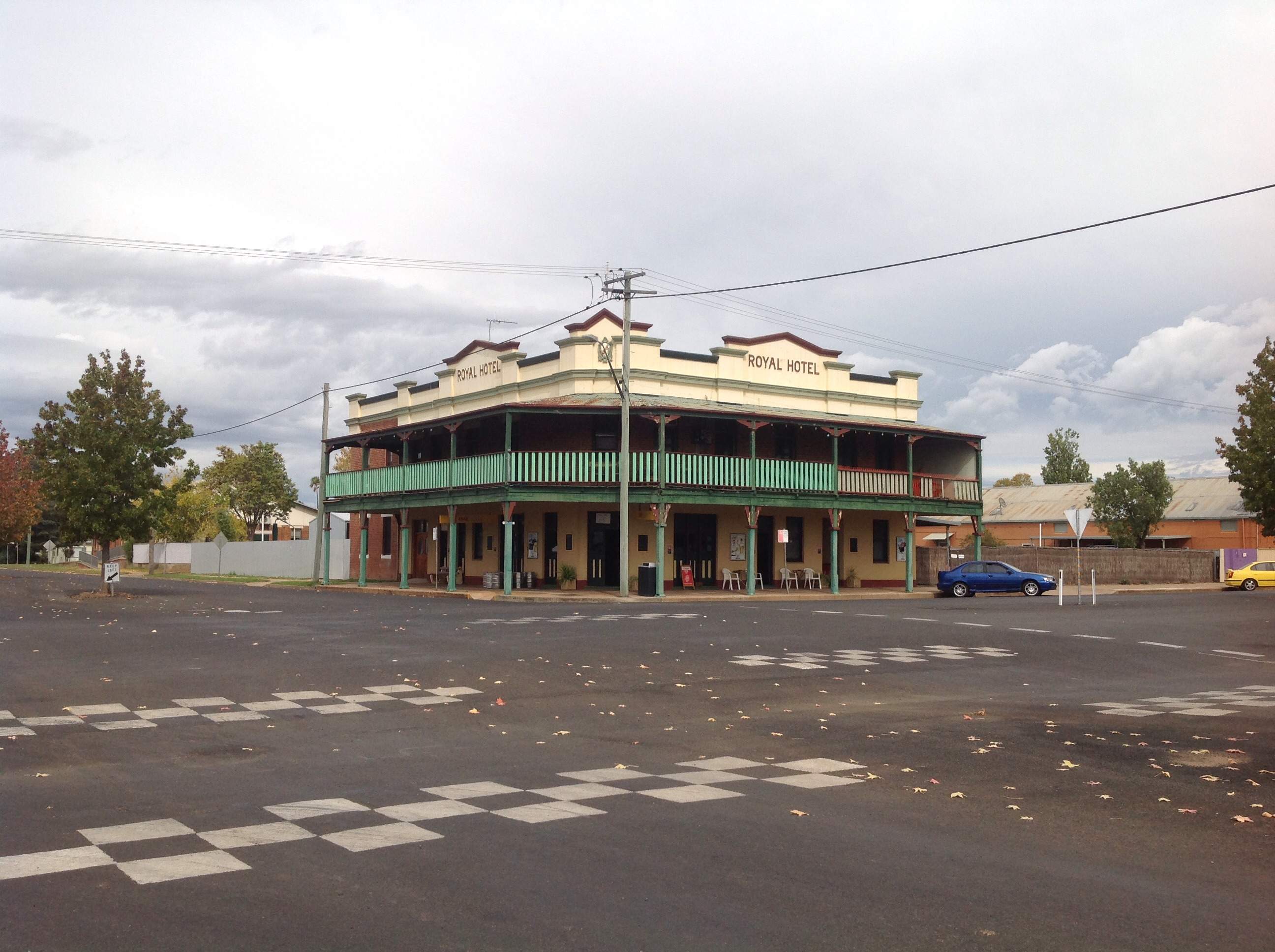
- Royal Hotel, Binnaway township

- Coordinates: 31°33′S 149°23′E
- Country: Australia
- State: New South Wales
- LGA: Warrumbungle Shire

Binnaway Parish is a civil Parish of Napier County, New South Wales, located on the Castlereagh River in central western New South Wales.

The parish is on the Gwabegar railway line. The only town of the parish is the railway junction of Binnaway, New South Wales and the economy of the parish is based on sheep.

The nearest man town is Coonabarabran to the north.
