= Murrawal, New South Wales =

Murrawal is a location on the now closed Gwabegar railway line in north-western New South Wales, Australia. A loop and loading bank station was located there between 1917 and 1972.

Murrawal is on the Castlereagh River in the Bungaba Parish, a civil parish of Napier County.

Preceding station	Former services	Following station
Deringulla towards Gwabegar	Gwabegar Line	Binnaway towards Wallerawang
