= Narangarie, New South Wales =

Narangarie is a civil parish of Napier County, New South Wales.

Narangarie is on the Gulgong Gold Fields and on the Talbragar River. The main settlement of the Parish is the town of Dunedoo, New South Wales.

Before European settlement Dunedoo and the surrounding area was occupied by the Gamilaroi and Wiradjuri peoples. Allan Cunningham was the first British explorer to the area in 1823 while travelling through Pandoras Pass over the Warrumbungle ranges to the Liverpool Plains.
