= Ulamambri, New South Wales =

Village in New South Wales, Australia

Ulamambri is a village in north-western New South Wales, Australia.

== Geography ==
Ulamambri is on the junction of the Castlereagh River and Ulamambri Creek, just south of the town of Coonabarabran, New South Wales. Ulamambri is in Toorawandi parish of Napier County, New South Wales. The parish is on the traditional lands of the Weilwan Aboriginal people.

== Railway ==
A railway station on the now closed Gwabegar railway line was located there between 1917 and 1976. The suburb of Ulamambri, adjoins Coonabarabran to the north west.

Preceding station	Former services	Following station
Coonabarabran towards Gwabegar	Gwabegar Line	Deringulla towards Wallerawang
