= Mumbedah, New South Wales =

Civil parish in New South Wales

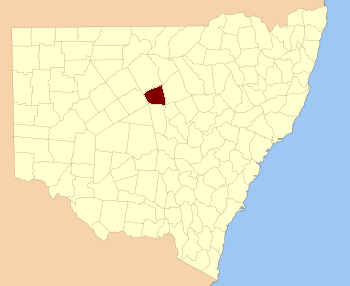
Napier County

Mumbedah is a civil parish, a creek and a hill in central New South Wales.

Mumbedah Parish is a civil parish of County of Napier, a county of the central western part of New South Wales, Australia in Warrumbungle Shire.

== History ==
Before European settlement the surrounding area was occupied by the Gamilaroi and Wiradjuri peoples. Allan Cunningham was the first British explorer to discover the area in 1823 while travelling through Pandoras Pass over the Warrumbungle ranges to the Liverpool Plains.
