= Lowe, New South Wales =

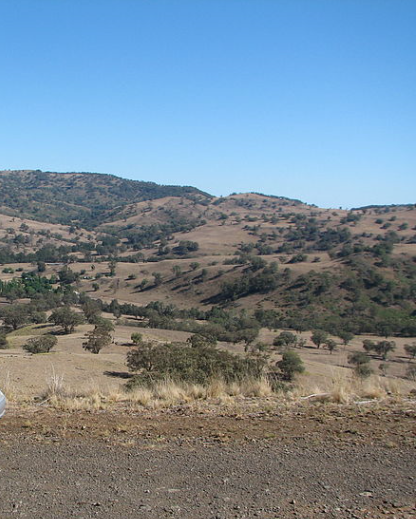
Lowe Parish, Napier County Landscape.

Lowe Parish is a civil Parish of Napier County, New South Wales.

The parish lies on the Coolaburragundy River, and its economy is based on agriculture.

== History ==
Before European settlement, the surrounding area was inhabited by the Gamilaroi and Wiradjuri peoples.

Allan Cunningham was the first British explorer to visit the area, in 1823 while travelling to Pandora's Pass (located within the parish) and across the Warrumbungle ranges to the Liverpool Plains.
