= Coolah Parish, New South Wales =

Coolah
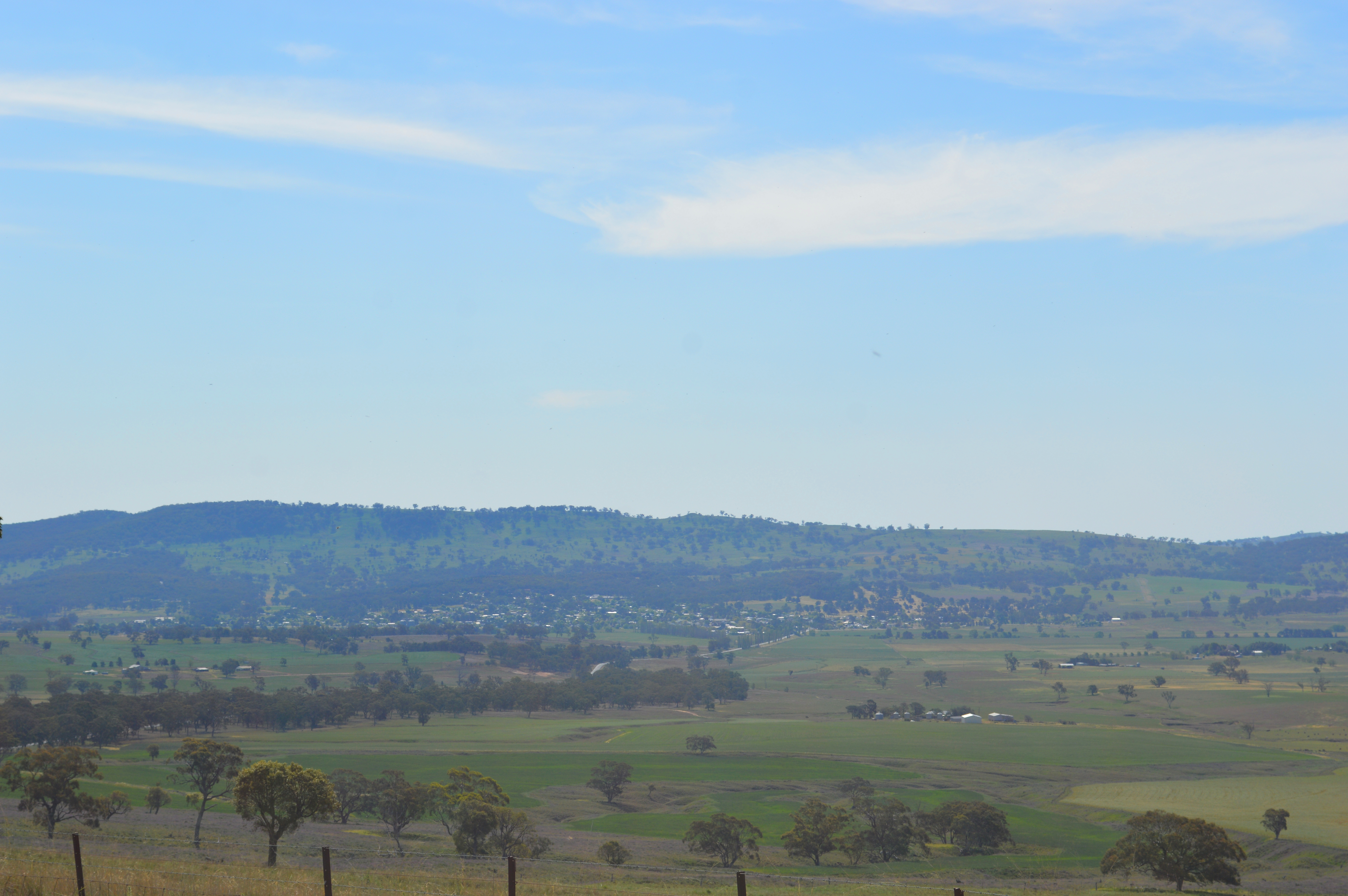
- Coolah Parish

- Coordinates: 31°50′0″S 149°43′0″E
- Country: Australia
- State: New South Wales
- LGA: Warrumbungle Shire
- Location: 370 km (230 mi) NW of Sydney; 136 km (85 mi) NE of Dubbo; 80 km (50 mi) NW of Merriwa

Government
  - State electorate: Barwon
  - Federal division: Parkes

Population
  - Total: 1,290 (2016 census)
- Postcode: 2843
- County: Napier County

Coolah Parish is a civil parish of the County of Napier, a county in the central western part of New South Wales, Australia in Warrumbungle Shire. The only town of the parish is Coolah, New South Wales and at the 2006 census, Coolah township had a population of 910.

== History ==
Before European settlement the area was occupied by the Gamilaroi and Wiradjuri peoples.

Allan Cunningham was the first British explorer to discover the area in 1823 while travelling Pandoras Pass over the Warrumbungle ranges to the Liverpool Plains. On the northeastern side of the area is the Liverpool Range with the Coolah Tops National Park. Most of the region is agricultural with sheep and cattle raising and crops grown along the Talbragar River and Coolaburragundy River valleys.

The town of Coolah, New South Wales is the main settlement of the parish.
