= Binnia, New South Wales =

Binnia is a civil parish of Napier County in New South Wales.

== History ==
Before European settlement the surrounding area was occupied by the Gamilaroi and Wiradjuri peoples. Allan Cunningham was the first British explorer to discover the area in 1823 while travelling through Pandoras Pass over the Warrumbungle ranges to the Liverpool Plains.
