= Deringulla, New South Wales =

Deringulla is a location in north-western New South Wales, Australia.

Deringulla is on the Castlereagh River.

A railway station on the now closed Gwabegar railway line was located there between 1917 and 1974.

Preceding station	Former services	Following station
Ulamambri towards Gwabegar	Gwabegar Line	Murrawal towards Wallerawang
