= Dunedoo railway station =

- Location within New South Wales Location within Australia
- 32°00′55″S 149°23′49″E
- Location: Gwabegar railway line, Dunedoo, Warrumbungle Shire, New South Wales, Australia

Site notes
- Owner: Transport Asset Manager of New South Wales

New South Wales Heritage Register
- Official name: Dunedoo Railway Station and yard group
- Type: State heritage (complex / group)
- Designated: 2 April 1999
- Reference no.: 1134
- Type: Railway Platform/Station
- Category: Transport – Rail

Dunedoo railway station

General information
- Location: Australia
- System: Regional rail
- Operator: NSW TrainLink
- Line: Gwabegar railway line
- Distance: 387.9 kilometres (241.0 mi) from Central

Other information
- Status: Closed

History
- Opened: 26 October 1910
- Closed: unknown
Location

The Dunedoo railway station is a heritage-listed closed railway station located on the Gwabegar railway line in Dunedoo, New South Wales, Australia. The building is also known as Dunedoo Railway Station and yard group. The property was added to the New South Wales State Heritage Register on 2 April 1999.

== Description ==
Buildings

The station building was completed in 1910 with a 70-metre (230 ft) station on the up side, with a timber skillion roof. Opposite were a loop line and a goods siding with a loading bank, goods shed and gantry crane. At the north end on the down side were servicing facilities consisting of a turntable, coal stage, and engine and carriage sheds. In 1935 silos and a silo siding were added. By 1965, the loco servicing facilities were gone. A detached corrugated iron out shed, W.C. and lamp room, was completed in 1910. A corrugated iron trike shed in also contained with the heritage site. The station building has been restored and painted. There is no platform in existence. It is believed that the platform will be restored. Layout consists of main line (platform road) and loop (silo road). Wheat silos are also in service.

Landscape

A row of peppercorn trees on the south side of site is located on the road corridor and is managed by Warrunbungle Shire Council.

== Heritage listing ==
Dunedoo represents a typical modest country station complex in good condition. It exhibits a range of structures not often seen in an homogeneous group. Its relationship to the main street of Dunedoo, the park and the commercial premises is strong, the railway complex forming an integral part of the townscape. The row of peppercorns along the edge of the park and the railway boundary screen the site allowing views of the structures from the town. They form an integral and important part of the complex and form the major vista from the town. The site is a good example of a single line station that has not been affected by duplication. The structures are typical of those used throughout the state from early in the century to about 1920. Being built all about the same time, it is an excellent example of a location that has not significantly altered or been extended. This occurred as the facilities provided were adequate for the relatively small community and the railway was constructed at around the peak development of the area.

Dunedoo railway station was listed on the New South Wales State Heritage Register on 2 April 1999 having satisfied the following criteria.

The place possesses uncommon, rare or endangered aspects of the cultural or natural history of New South Wales.

This item is assessed as historically rare. This item is assessed as architecturally rare. This item is assessed as socially rare.

== See also ==
- List of NSW TrainLink railway stations
