= Butheroo, New South Wales =

Civil parish of Napier County, New South Wales, Australia

Butheroo is a civil parish of Napier County, a county of central New South Wales.

Butheroo is on the Butheroo Creek.
