= Allison, New South Wales =

Rural locality in New South Wales, Australia

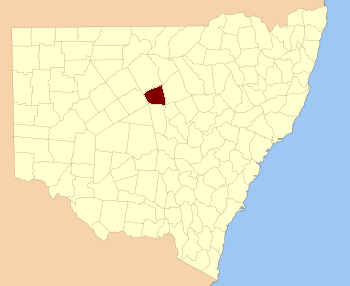
Napier County

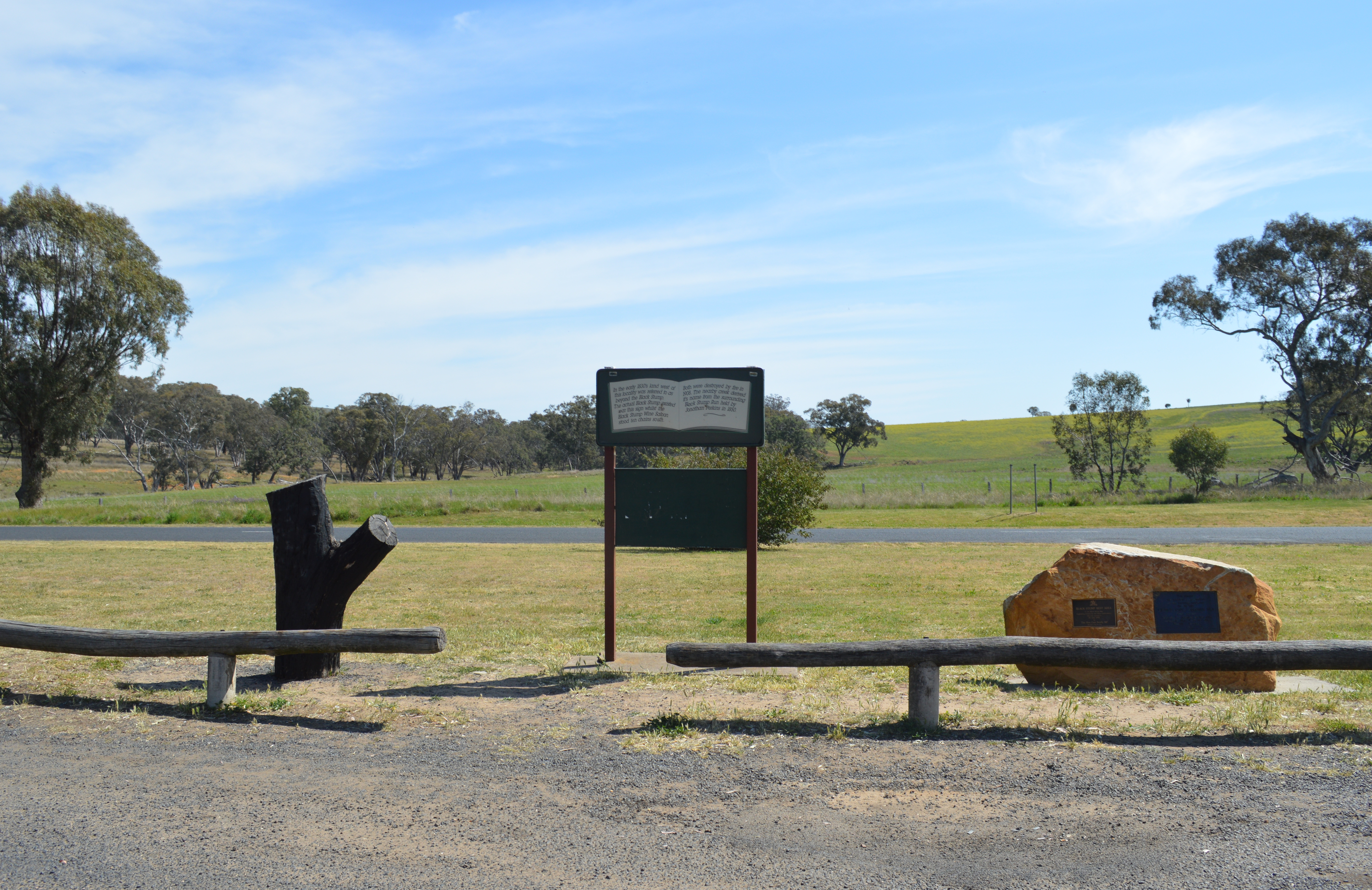
Coolah Black Stump

Allison Parish, New South Wales, is a rural locality of Warrumbungle Shire Council and a civil parish of Napier County a county of central western New South Wales.

The civil parish is located outside of Coolah, New South Wales, and by some accounts is the location of the proverbial Black Stump. During colonial times the Coolburragundy River was a boundary of the Nineteen Counties in the colony of New South Wales, Australia. Settlers were permitted to take up land only within the 19 counties due to the dangers in the wilderness. The stump in Allison parish being on the other side of the river from the civilized areas was therefore a colloquial marker for the beginning of the outback.
