= Piambra, New South Wales =

Coordinates: 31.6369°S 149.3730°E

Piambra is rural locality of Warrumbungle Shire Council and a civil parish of Napier County.

Piambra is also a location on the Gwabegar railway line in north-western New South Wales, Australia. A Railway station was located there between 1914 and 1974.

Preceding station	Former services	Following station
Binnaway towards Gwabegar	Gwabegar Line	Mooren towards Wallerawang
