= Gregory Mathews =

Australian amateur ornithologist

Gregory Mathews CBE FRSE FZS FLS
- Born: 10 September 1876; Biamble, New South Wales, Australia
- Died: 27 March 1949 (aged 72); Winchester, England
- Education: The King's School, Parramatta
- Known for: Bringing trinomial nomenclature into local taxonomy
- Scientific career
- Fields: Ornithology (amateur)
- Author abbrev. (zoology): Mathews

Gregory Macalister Mathews CBE FRSE FZS FLS (10 September 1876 – 27 March 1949) was an Australian-born amateur ornithologist who spent most of his later life in England.

== Life ==
He was born in Biamble in New South Wales the son of Robert H. Mathews. He was educated at The King's School, Parramatta.

Mathews made his fortune in mining shares and moved to England in 1902. In 1910, he was elected a Fellow of the Royal Society of Edinburgh. His proposers were William Eagle Clarke, Ramsay Heatley Traquair, John Alexander Harvie-Brown and William Evans.

== Ornithology ==
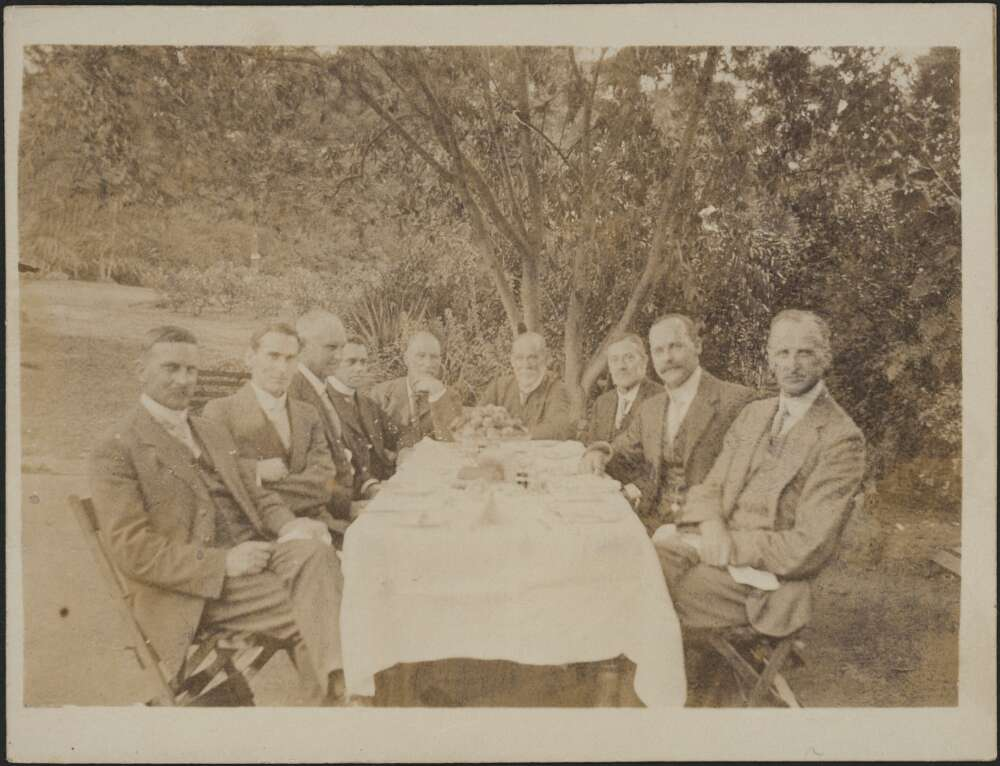
Meeting of Royal Australasian Ornithologists Union (RAOU) with members Dr J. Leach, L. Chandler, C. McLennan, C. Barrett, A.J. Campbell, Dudley Le Souef, T. Tregallas, Z. Gray, Gregory Mathews

Mathews was a controversial figure in Australian ornithology. He was responsible for bringing trinomial nomenclature into local taxonomy, however he was regarded as an extreme splitter. He recognised large numbers of subspecies on scant evidence and few notes. The extinct Lord Howe Pigeon was described by Mathews in 1915, using a painting as a guide. At the time, he named it Raperia godmanae after Alice Mary Godman.

His approach drew a hostile response from Archibald James Campbell, a leading Australian figure in ornithology at the time. He later began splitting genera. Dominic Serventy foretold that although a great many of these subspecies ceased to be recognised, future research would have to resort to the use of some of them if and when evidence supported their distinct status.

He was Chairman of the British Ornithologists' Club from 1935 to 1938. He was made CBE in 1939 for his services to ornithology.

Mathews described Malurus splendens musgravei, currently recognised as a subspecies of the splendid fairywren, in 1922, as a new species of bird.

In 1939, he was elected a Fellow of the Royal Australasian Ornithologists Union and served as its president from 1946–1947. Mathews built up a collection of 30,000 bird skins and a library of 5,000 books on ornithology. He donated his ornithological library to the National Library of Australia in 1939.

In 1939, Matthews donated a small collection of Aboriginal ethnographic items from Australia to the British Museum.

== Family ==
He married Mrs Marian Wynne, a widow. He died in Winchester on 27 March 1949.

== Publications ==
Mathews contributed numerous papers to the ornithological literature, especially on avian taxonomy and nomenclature, as well as founding, funding, editing and being the principal contributor to the journal The Austral Avian Record. Monographic or book-length works authored or coauthored by him include:

- 1908 – The Handlist of the Birds of Australia. (Based on A Handlist of Birds by Bowdler Sharpe).
- 1910–1927 – The Birds of Australia Witherby: London. (12 volumes, assisted by Tom Iredale).
- 1912 – The Reference List of the Birds of Australia. (Novitates Zoologicae, 18 January 1912).
- 1913 – A List of the Birds of Australia. Witherby: London.
- 1920 – The Name List of the Birds of Australia.
- 1921 – A Manual of the Birds of Australia. Volume I: Orders Casuarii to Columbae. Witherby: London. (With Tom Iredale. Only one volume published of a projected four).
- 1924 – The Check-List of the Birds of Australia. Witherby: London. (Comprising Supplements 1-3 of The Birds of Australia).
- 1925 – The Bibliography of the Birds of Australia. Witherby: London. (Comprising Supplements 4 and 5 of The Birds of Australia).
- 1927 – Systema Avium Australasianarum. a Systematic List of the Birds of the Australasian Region. BOU: London. (2 volumes).
- 1928 – The Birds of Norfolk and Lord Howe Islands and the Australian South Polar Quadrant. Witherby: London.
- 1931 – A List of the Birds of Australasia, Including New Zealand, Lord Howe and Norfolk Islands, and the Australasian Antarctic Quadrant.
- 1936 – A Supplement to the Birds of Norfolk and Lord Howe Islands to which is Added those Birds of New Zealand not figured by Buller. Witherby: London.
- 1942 – Birds and Books: the Story of the Mathews Ornithological Library. Verity Hewitt Bookshop: Canberra.
- 1943 – Notes on the Order Procellariiformes. (With Edward Hallstrom).
- 1946 – A Working List of Australian Birds, including the Australian Quadrant and New Zealand. Shepherd Press: Sydney.
