= Morven Parish, New South Wales =

Morven Parish is a civil parish of County of Napier, a county in the central western part of New South Wales, Australia.

The parish is in Warrumbungle Shire and the only town of the parish is Morven.
