= Neilrex, New South Wales =

Neilrex is a bounded rural locality in north-western New South Wales, Australia. A now-removed railway station on the Gwabegar railway line was located there between 1917 and 1974. Wheat silos and a siding remain in use.

Preceding station	Former services	Following station
Mooren towards Gwabegar	Gwabegar Line	Merrygoen towards Wallerawang
