= Napier County =

Napier
- Cadastral division
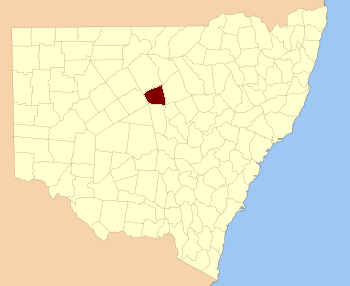
- Location in New South Wales
- Country: Australia
- State: New South Wales

Napier County is one of the 141 cadastral divisions of New South Wales.

Napier County is named in honour of Field Marshal Robert Cornelius Napier, First Baron Napier of Magdala (1810–1890).

== Parishes within this county ==
A full list of parishes found within this county; their current LGA and mapping coordinates to the approximate centre of each location is as follows:

Parish	LGA	Coordinates
Allison	Warrumbungle Shire Council	31°39′54″S 149°45′04″E
Biamble	Warrumbungle Shire Council	31°43′54″S 149°19′04″E
Binnaway	Warrumbungle Shire Council	31°31′54″S 149°27′04″E
Binnia	Warrumbungle Shire Council	31°41′54″S 149°48′04″E
Bullinda	Warrumbungle Shire Council	31°49′54″S 149°28′04″E
Bungabah	Warrumbungle Shire Council	31°29′54″S 149°23′04″E
Butheroo	Warrumbungle Shire Council	31°41′54″S 149°26′04″E
Carlisle	Warrumbungle Shire Council	31°42′54″S 149°33′04″E
Cookabingie	Warrumbungle Shire Council	31°27′54″S 149°36′04″E
Coolah	Warrumbungle Shire Council	31°54′54″S 149°39′04″E
Dalglish	Warrumbungle Shire Council	31°48′54″S 149°37′04″E
Gundare	Warrumbungle Shire Council	31°43′54″S 149°48′04″E
Lowe	Warrumbungle Shire Council	31°42′54″S 149°53′04″E
Malcolm	Warrumbungle Shire Council	31°47′54″S 149°31′04″E
Mendooran	Warrumbungle Shire Council	31°47′54″S 149°17′04″E
Merrygoen	Warrumbungle Shire Council	31°49′54″S 149°23′04″E
Moorangoorang	Warrumbungle Shire Council	31°41′54″S 149°22′04″E
Morven	Warrumbungle Shire Council	31°37′54″S 149°32′04″E
Mumbedah	Warrumbungle Shire Council	31°51′42″S 149°34′52″E
Napier	Warrumbungle Shire Council	31°35′54″S 149°46′04″E
Narangarie	Warrumbungle Shire Council	31°56′54″S 149°33′04″E
Neible	Warrumbungle Shire Council	31°34′54″S 149°40′04″E
Piambra	Warrumbungle Shire Council	31°36′54″S 149°28′04″E
Purlewaugh	Warrumbungle Shire Council	31°18′54″S 149°34′04″E
Queensborough	Warrumbungle Shire Council	31°42′54″S 149°39′04″E
Terrawinda	Warrumbungle Shire Council	31°24′54″S 149°30′04″E
Toorawandi	Warrumbungle Shire Council	31°22′54″S 149°23′04″E
Ulinda	Warrumbungle Shire Council	31°33′54″S 149°33′04″E
Yuggel	Warrumbungle Shire Council	31°21′54″S 149°33′04″E
