= Mooren, New South Wales =

Mooren is a location on the Gwabegar railway line in north-western New South Wales, Australia. A station was located there between 1917 and 1974.

Mooren is also in the civil parish of Moorangoorang.

Preceding station	Former services	Following station
Piambra towards Gwabegar	Gwabegar Line	Neilrex towards Wallerawang
