= Neible, New South Wales =

Civil parish of Napier County

Neible Parish, New South Wales is a civil parish of Napier County, a county located in central western New South Wales.
