= Napier Parish, New South Wales =

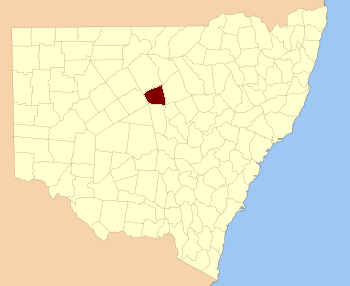
Napier County

Napier is a rural locality of Warrumbungle Shire Council and a civil parish of Napier County New South Wales. and is at 31°35′54″S 149°46′04″E.

Neible is in the Warrembungle Ranges on Oakey Creek. The now closed Oakey Creek Railway Station is within the parish.
