= Dunedoo =

- Town
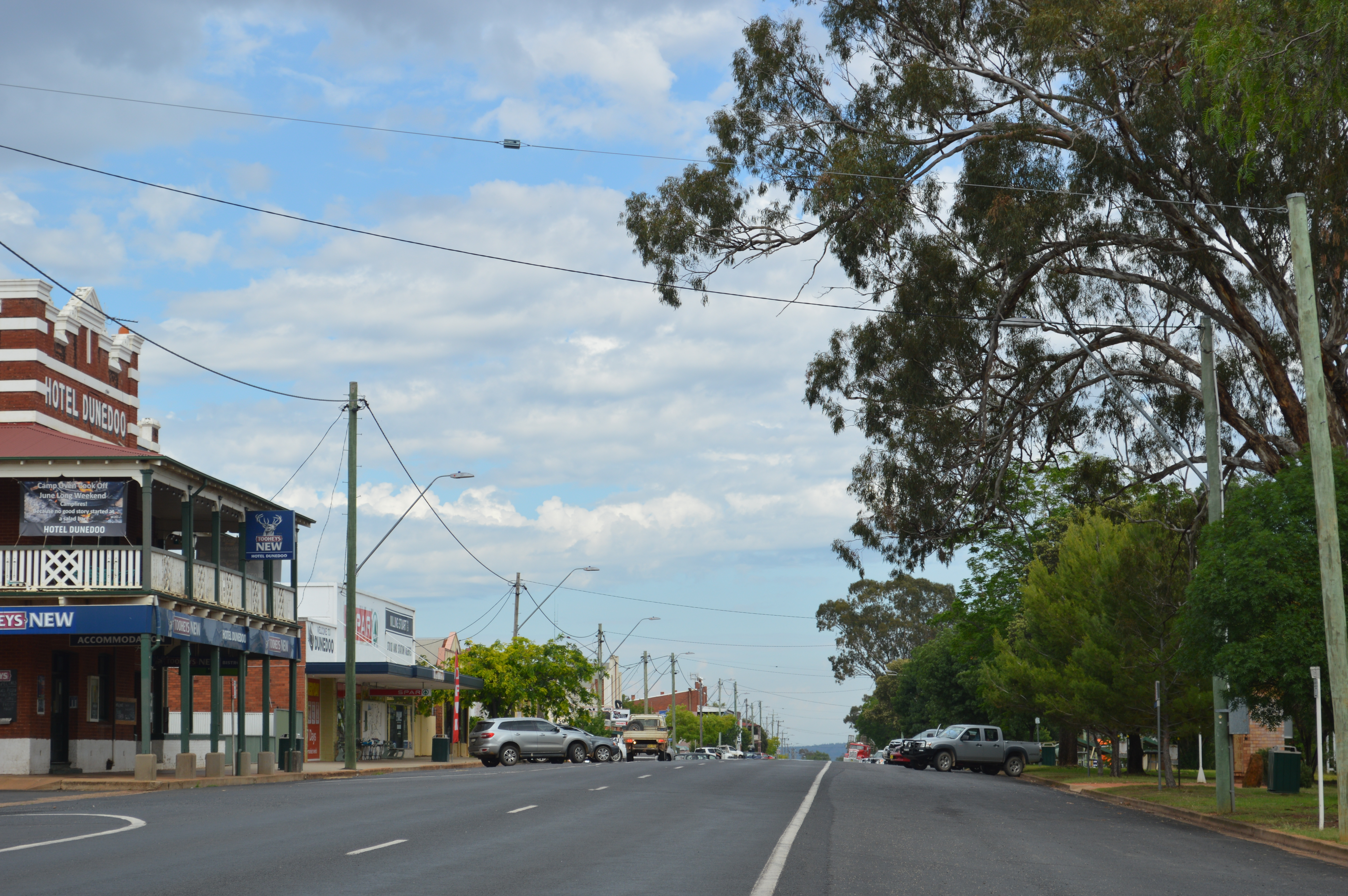
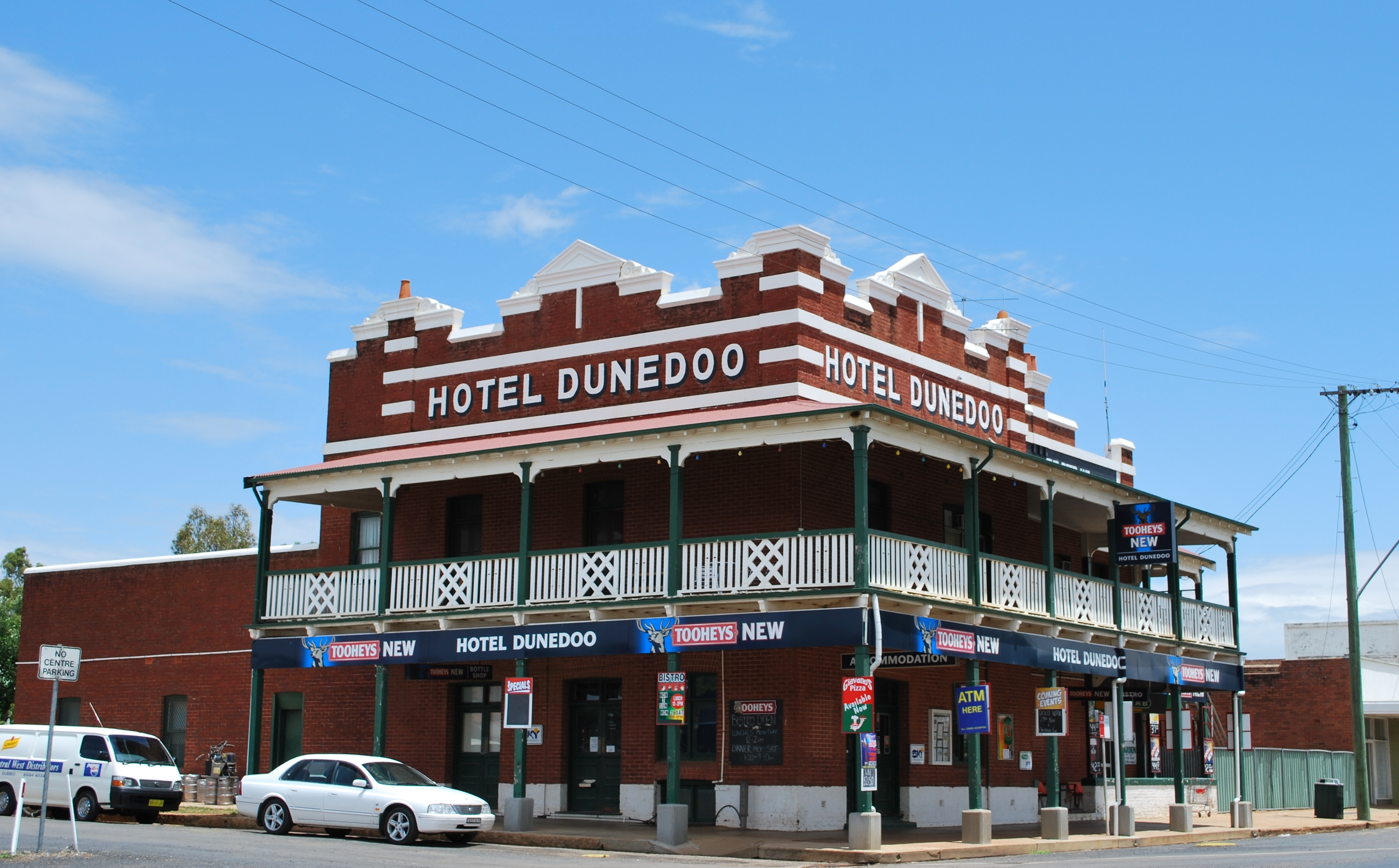
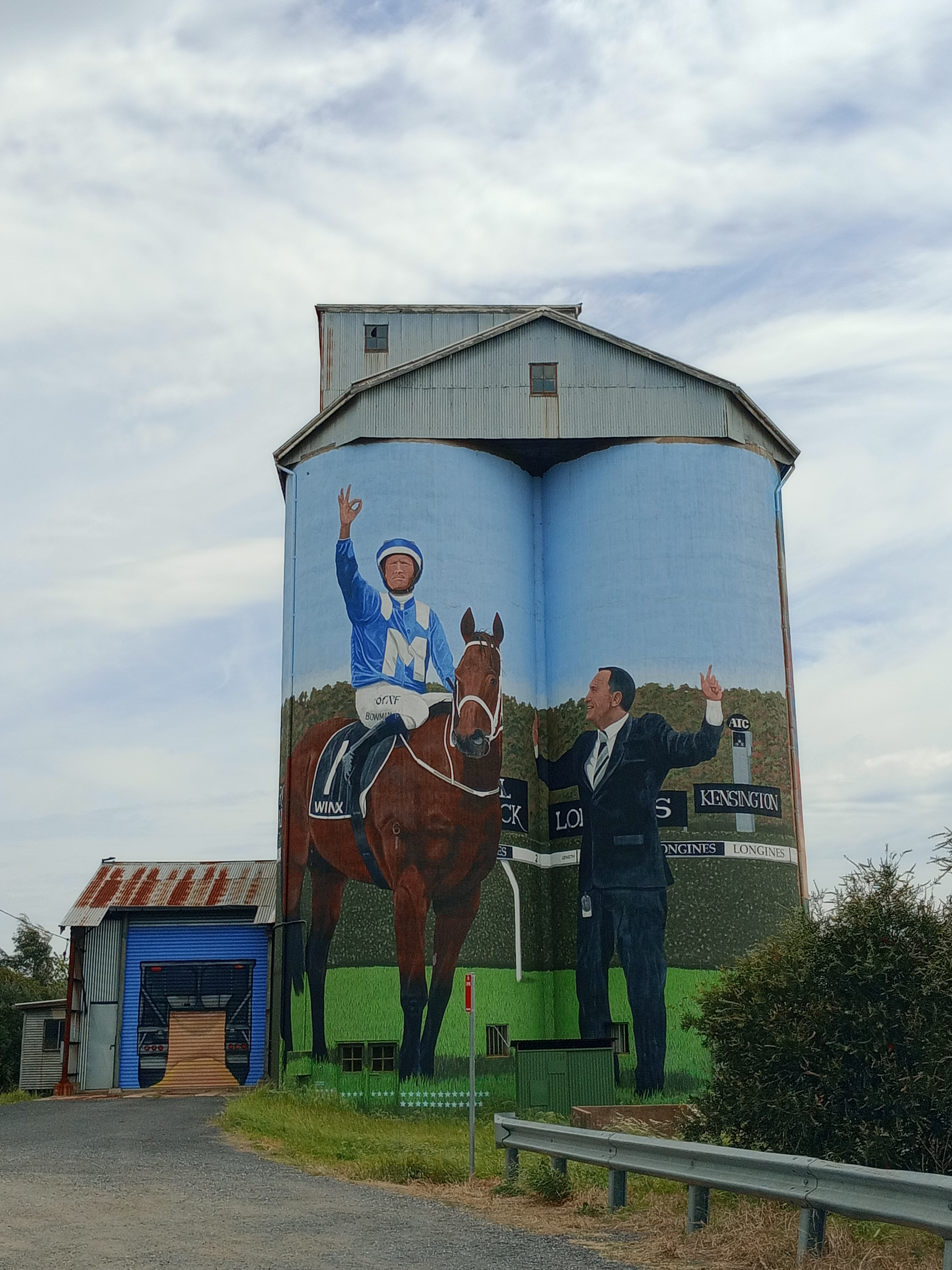
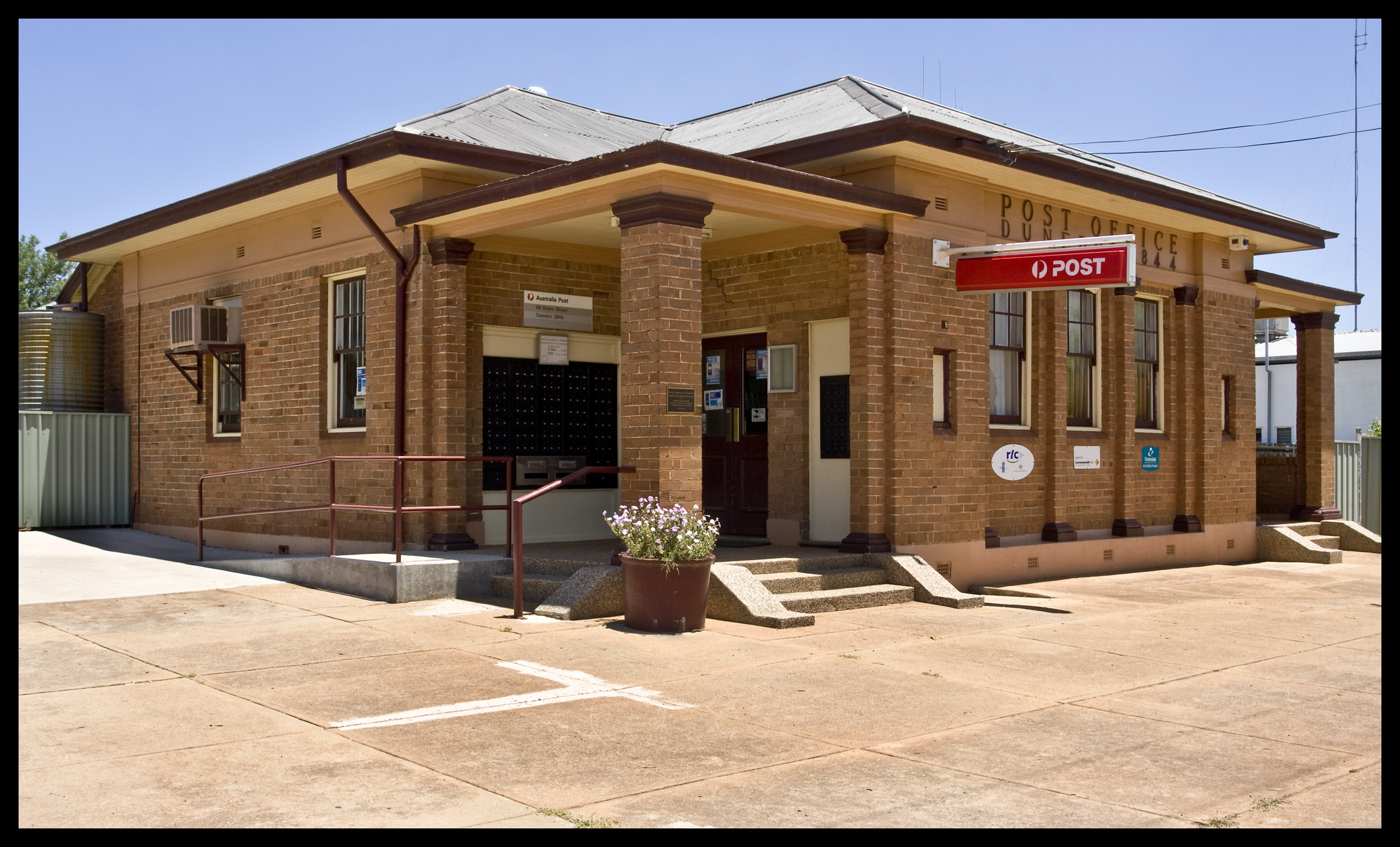
- The Castlereagh Highway Dunedoo Hotel A mural on the wheat silos Dunedoo Post Office

- Coordinates: 32°01′0″S 149°24′0″E
- Country: Australia
- State: New South Wales
- LGA: Warrumbungle Shire
- Location: 90 km (56 mi) from Mudgee; 100 km (62 mi) from Dubbo
- Established: 1840s

Government
  - State electorate: Upper Hunter
  - Federal division: Parkes
- Elevation: 399 m (1,309 ft)

Population
  - Total: 1,021 (2021 census)
- Postcode: 2844
- County: Bligh
- Mean max temp: 23.8 °C (74.8 °F)
- Mean min temp: 9.5 °C (49.1 °F)
- Annual rainfall: 614.2 mm (24.18 in)

Dunedoo (/ˈdʌniduː/ DUN-ee-doo) is a village of 1,021 inhabitants situated within the Warrumbungle Shire of central western New South Wales, Australia. Dunedoo is well known to Australian travellers due to its distinctive name (dunny is a colloquial Australian word for a toilet). The name is actually derived from a local Aboriginal word meaning 'swan', which are commonly found in the area's lagoons.

The town is located on the north-western edges of the Sydney basin.

== Geography and features ==
Dunedoo is located 399 metres (1,309 ft) above sea-level on the southern bank of the Talbragar River at the intersection of the Golden and Castlereagh Highways. It is a relatively isolated township with the two nearest rural centres of Mudgee and Dubbo situated approximately 90 kilometres (56 mi) to the south and 100 kilometres (62 mi) west respectively. It is due to this isolation that Dunedoo has many facilities not usually found in villages of this size. Dunedoo largely functions as a service centre to the surrounding district which focuses on the production of wheat, cattle, mixed farming, timber, lambs and wool. As with many wheat-growing centres of western New South Wales the village's skyline is dominated by a large silo. The Dunedoo silo has Winx on it. Dunedoo also features a hospital (Dunedoo War Memorial Hospital), two schools (a government administered combined primary and high school and a catholic primary school), a licensed hotel, a small commercial area, a small freight railway station as well as sporting and special event facilities. Dunedoo also features Catholic, Anglican and Presbyterian churches.

== History ==
Before European settlement Dunedoo and the surrounding area was occupied by the Gamilaroi and Wiradjuri peoples. Allan Cunningham was the first British explorer to discover the area in 1823 while travelling Pandoras Pass over the Warrumbungle ranges to the Liverpool Plains. Surveyors studied the area in 1832 followed by squatters who settled the region. The town was founded somewhere in the 1840s and was originally known as Bolaro and later as Redbank. Dunedoo remained a small village throughout the 19th century and the nearby town of Cobbora was considered to be the regional centre for many years. However, Dunedoo's population grew substantially after the construction of the Gwabegar railway line and the opening of passenger services in 1910. Bolaro Post Office opened on 1 November 1876 and was renamed Dunedoo in 1909.

The first half of the 20th century saw many of Dunedoo's residents fighting in both the first and second world wars, documented by the war memorial currently found in the town's park. The gradual loss of railway services in western NSW affected Dunedoo in the 1960s with the loss of passenger railway services, however freight trains still commonly use the line. Other services, such as the village's cinema, have also been lost over time.

In 2002, Dunedoo appeared in an ABC documentary entitled "A Loo with a View". Dunedoo is currently suffering the fate of many small regional towns of NSW in that its population is gradually decreasing. Many locals fear that the town will eventually be deserted and thus many creative ideas have been floated as possible methods of reversing the current trend. The Dunedoo District Development Group had proposed to build "The Big Dunny" in the hope of attracting tourists, as the Big Banana does for Coffs Harbour and big things in other parts of Australia. The documentary centred on "The Big Dunny" proposal, it was to have been a three-storey high building featuring five-star toilets, visitor centre, viewing platform, and even a radio station. Local shire councillor and farmer Frank Gaden was against it, reckoning it would be an embarrassment. Feasibility consultant Ian Farlow concluded it would, unfortunately, attract only 30 visitors a day which would not be enough to make it worthwhile, and proposed instead an environmentally friendly self-composting toilet block. The council decided against the latter and in the end nothing was built.

2005 saw the town incorporated into the newly created Warrumbungle Shire, formed from the previous Coolah and Coonabarabran Shires. The town was briefly divided over the prospect of joining Coonabarabran Shire with many preferring the town be incorporated into the Mudgee-based Mid-Western Regional Council.

== Heritage listings ==
Dunedoo has a number of heritage-listed sites, including:

- Wallerawang-Gwabegar railway: Dunedoo railway station

== Population ==
In the 2016 Census, there were 747 people in Dunedoo. 84.8% of people were born in Australia and 91.0% of people spoke only English at home. The most common responses for religion were Anglican 38.1%, Catholic 24.8%, No Religion 18.2%.

== Climate ==
Dunedoo's climate is on the drier end of a subtropical climate (Cfa), with a large difference between summer and winter.

Climate data for Dunedoo (1991–2020 averages, extremes 1965–present)
Month	Jan	Feb	Mar	Apr	May	Jun	Jul	Aug	Sep	Oct	Nov	Dec	Year
Record high °C (°F)	44.8 (112.6)	45.4 (113.7)	39.8 (103.6)	34.1 (93.4)	28.6 (83.5)	24.5 (76.1)	24.0 (75.2)	28.8 (83.8)	34.4 (93.9)	37.1 (98.8)	43.7 (110.7)	43.8 (110.8)	45.4 (113.7)
Mean daily maximum °C (°F)	33.1 (91.6)	31.7 (89.1)	28.7 (83.7)	24.9 (76.8)	20.1 (68.2)	16.4 (61.5)	15.8 (60.4)	17.9 (64.2)	21.7 (71.1)	25.5 (77.9)	28.7 (83.7)	31.3 (88.3)	24.7 (76.5)
Mean daily minimum °C (°F)	18.0 (64.4)	17.5 (63.5)	14.6 (58.3)	10.4 (50.7)	6.3 (43.3)	4.0 (39.2)	2.5 (36.5)	2.9 (37.2)	6.0 (42.8)	9.5 (49.1)	13.3 (55.9)	15.7 (60.3)	10.1 (50.2)
Record low °C (°F)	5.2 (41.4)	7.0 (44.6)	1.1 (34.0)	−2.2 (28.0)	−5.1 (22.8)	−6.7 (19.9)	−8.3 (17.1)	−6.7 (19.9)	−3.3 (26.1)	−1.7 (28.9)	0.5 (32.9)	1.2 (34.2)	−8.3 (17.1)
Average precipitation mm (inches)	69.6 (2.74)	64.3 (2.53)	52.6 (2.07)	41.5 (1.63)	44.4 (1.75)	44.5 (1.75)	46.9 (1.85)	40.8 (1.61)	42.5 (1.67)	52.6 (2.07)	54.7 (2.15)	62.7 (2.47)	617.2 (24.30)
Average precipitation days	6.2	5.7	5.0	4.6	6.3	7.3	7.9	7.2	6.7	7.0	6.7	6.6	77.2

== Sport and culture ==
Dunedoo features many sporting facilities including Robertson Oval (used for rugby league and netball). The Dunedoo Sports club has a 9-hole golf course and four grass tennis courts, as well as two squash courts. Touch football is also played there during the summer months on part of the golf course close to the club building. Dunedoo also has a lawn bowls club. Competitions are held regularly in each of these sports within the town.

Dunedoo Swans rugby league team play in the Castlereagh Cup rugby league and produced former St George and NSW centre Brian Johnston. Their uniform features the colours green and white.

Between 1957 and 1959, the Dunedoo Car Club held four motor racing meetings on a course located on the "Wargundy" property approximately 10 kilometres south-east of the town. The circuit was less than a mile in length, and originally was dirt with oil bonded into the surface, although later the Club paved several corners, with the intention of paving the whole circuit in the future. Unfortunately for the Club, as the circuit was in private property, it was not covered by any lease, and existed purely on the goodwill of the owner of "Wargundy". The owner withdrew the goodwill in 1959, and the circuit closed down.

Dunedoo is host to many festivals including the Dunedoo Bush Poetry Festival held annually in April by the Dunedoo District Development Group. The Dunedoo Show is held each February featuring carnival rides and several rodeo-themed events including whip-cracking and bull riding. The town also holds annual ANZAC Day marches and Christmas parades in the main street.

Dunedoo has a community radio station, Three Rivers Radio. It broadcasts continuously on a frequency of 96.1 MHz. Programs include Sport, Good Music Cafe, Jazz, Great Musicals, Hymns, Chatter Box (Dunedoo Central School on air each week), St Michaels School alternate weeks, Good music all the time including Frank Bourke's old time orchestra each week.

== See also ==
- Denison Town, nearby ghost town
