= Purlewaugh =

Locality in New South Wales, Australia

Purlewaugh is a locality in the Warrumbungle Shire, New South Wales, Australia.
