= Merrygoen =

Merrygoen New South Wales
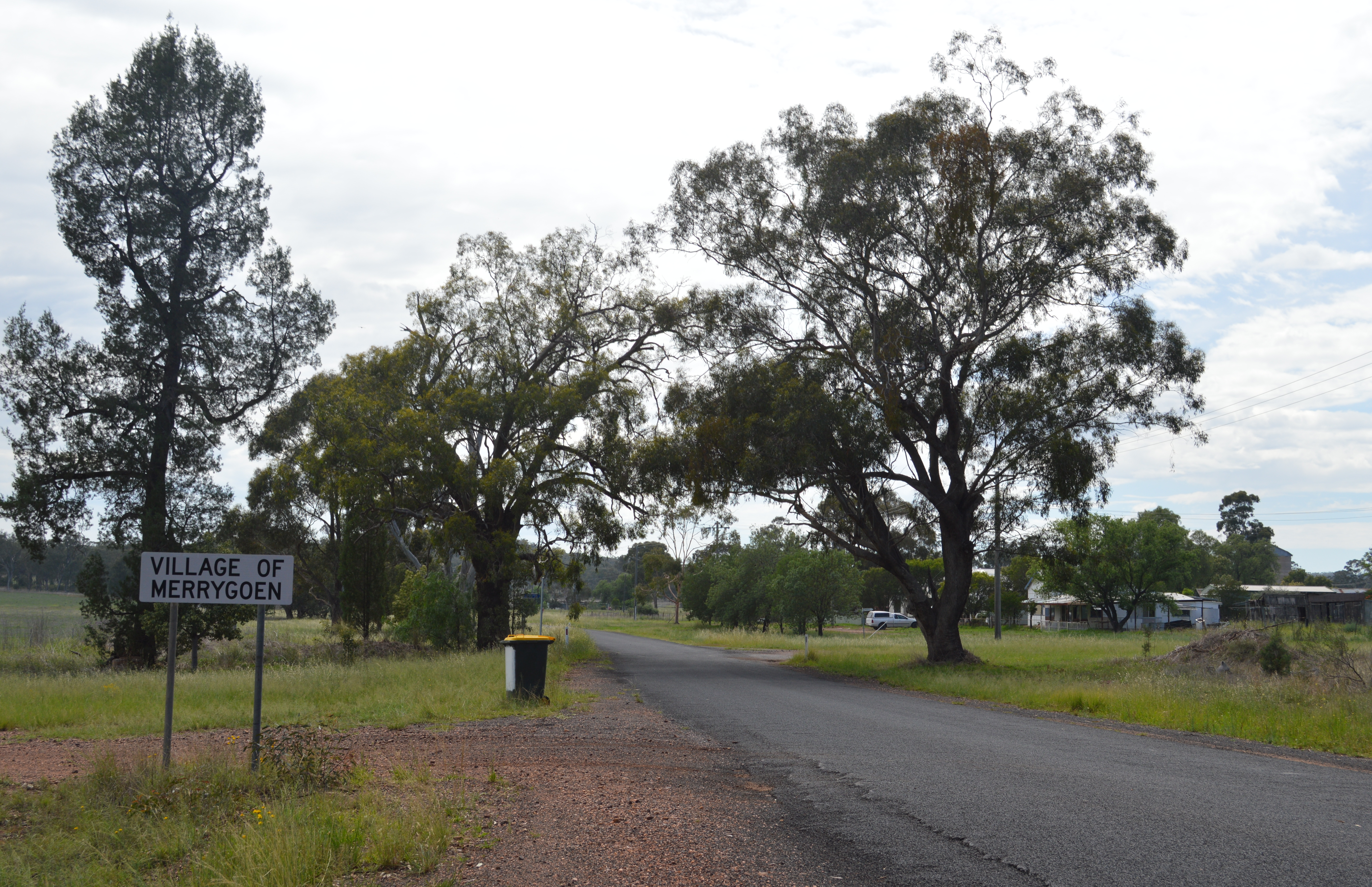
- Entering Merrygoen, 2017

- Coordinates: 31°49′31.8″S 149°13′51.6″E
- Population: 115 (2016 census)
- Postcode(s): 2831
- LGA(s): Warrumbungle Shire
- State electorate(s): Barwon
- Federal division(s): Parkes

Merrygoen is a small township in north-western New South Wales, Australia. The town is a junction point between railway lines to Troy Junction on the Coonamble railway line, and the Gwabegar railway line. The railway station is now closed, however wheat silos and several sidings remain in use. Merrygoen is in the Gap to Dubbo section of the Intrastate Network managed by the Australian Rail Track Corporation.

Merrygoen Post Office opened on 1 November 1879.

| Preceding station | Former services | Following station |
|---|---|---|
| Neilrex towards Gwabegar | Gwabegar Line | Wongoni towards Wallerawang |
| Boothejnba towards Troy Junction | Troy Junction–Merrygoen Line | Terminus |
