= Pandoras Pass =

- Brennans Gap; Pandora's Pass
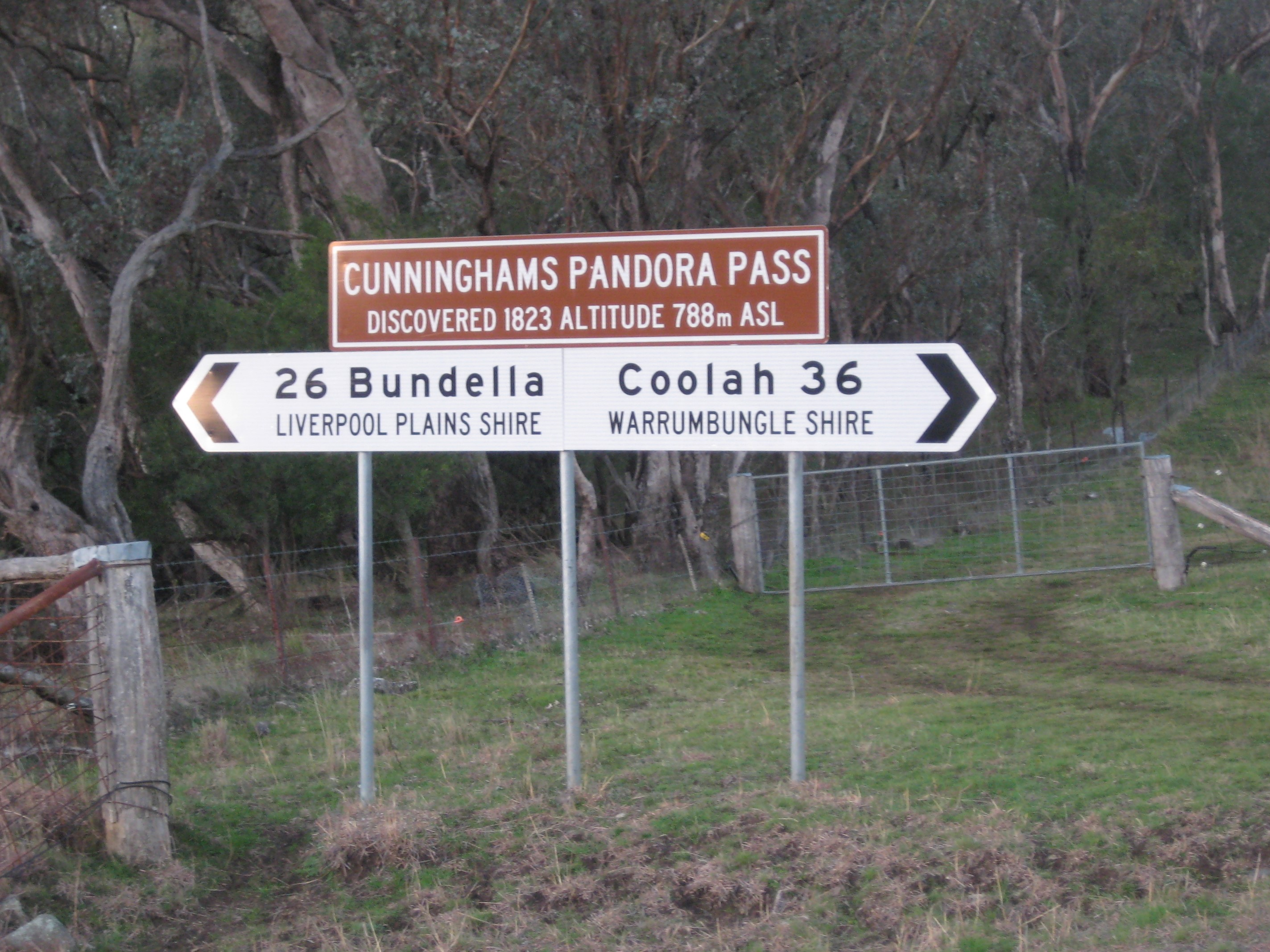
- Road sign on Pandoras Pass

- Location within New South Wales
- Elevation: 788 m (2,585 ft)
- Traversed by: Rockgedgiel to Pandoras Road

Location
- Location: Coolah Tops National Park, New South Wales, Australia
- Range: Warrumbungle Range, Great Dividing Range
- Coordinates: 31°43′S 149°55′E
- Topo map: Coolah 8834

The Pandoras Pass, also Brennans Gap and Pandora's Pass is a mountain pass across the Warrumbungle Range, a spur off the Great Dividing Range, located in the Coolah Tops National Park in northwestern New South Wales, Australia.

At an altitude of 788 metres (2,585 ft) above sea level, the pass provides a passage between Dunedoo and Coolah in the southwest and Premer and the Liverpool Plains in the north.

The area was first explored by Europeans in 1823 by the botanist and explorer Allan Cunningham. He discovered the pass on 9 June 1823 after searching for approximately 50 miles (80 km) from an easterly direction. The pass allowed an easy passage through the mountain range to the Liverpool Plains on the northern side of the mountain range. The exploration journey commenced from Bathurst in April 1823.

Today the pass is a lightly used gravel road with the main traffic through the mountain range passing through other routes, such as the New England Highway to the east and the Black Stump Way to the west.

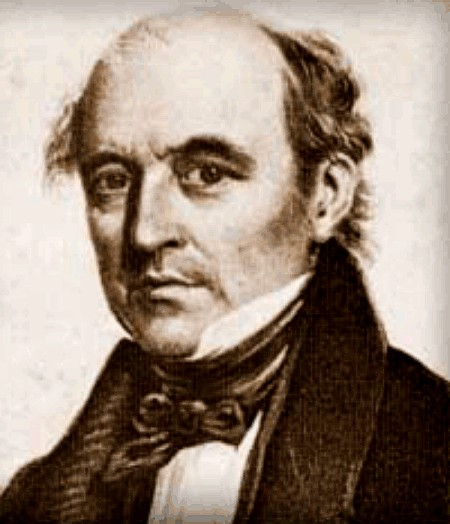
Allan Cunningham

== European discovery ==
After receiving Governor Brisbane's approval for the exploration Cunningham left Sydney on 31 March 1823, crossing the Nepean River on his way to Bathurst. Arriving at Bathurst he made final preparations for the journey and departed north on 15 April. He took with him five servants and "five strong packhorses" to carry their provisions. Cunninhams party passed through Dabee, now known as Rylstone, reaching the Goulburn River on 6 May 1823. Now the southern edge of the Liverpool Range was only 15 miles (24 km) to the north and he proceeded there. He reached Mount Macarthur (now Mount Moan) Cunningham now sought a passage through the range and decided to move east along the bottom of the range. After realising the range was becoming more difficult he "halted on the verge of a perpendicular ravine, being unable to advance another mile to the eastward by reason of the sharp water gullies between which lay steep ravines". He returned to Mount Moan, the fruitless journey east costing three weeks and three days. They proceeded north west again searching for a passage through the Liverpool Range. After a further six days Cunningham decided to mount the western range and take his bearings. The view he obtained filled him with delight; for, on looking round him and tracing the line of the main northern range, he saw a considerable depression in the range, and writes: "it was a very low back in the main ridge distant about 3 miles (4.8 km), and although limited, afforded me a clear view of the open plains north of this extensive barrier."

Cunningham named the pass Pandora's Pass, (now also known as Brennan's Gap) and that he "believed it would become the great route of communication between Bathurst and Hunter River and the Liverpool Plains." He returned via present day Mudgee to the town of Bathurst arriving there on 27 June 1823 after an arduous eleven weeks travelling.

== Etymology ==
In his diary Cunningham described the difficulties and many privations of finding this pass, and he says 'and in spite of these little evils - a hope at the bottom', he then names it Pandoras Pass. This is a reference to the Greek myth of Pandora's box, this myth refers to a vessel which contained all the evils of the world. When Pandora opened the jar, all its contents except for one item were released into the world. The one remaining item was hope.

=== Cunningham's diary ===
The following memorandum, written on parchment, was enclosed in a bottle, and buried under a marked tree in the Pandora Pass:

After a very laborious and harassing journey from Bathurst, since April last, a party, consisting of five persons, under the direction of Allan Cunningham, H.M. Botanist (making the sixth individual), having failed of finding a route to Liverpool Plains, whilst tracing the south base of the Barrier Mountains (before us north), so far as fifty miles to the eastward of this spot, at length upon prosecuting their research under this great mountain belt, in a westerly direction, reached this valley, and discovered a practicable and easy passage through a low part of the mountain belt, north by west from this tree, to the very extensive levels connected with the abovementioned plains, of which the southernmost of the chain is distant about eleven or twelve miles (by estimation), N.N.W. from this valley, and to which a line of trees has been carefully marked, thus opening an unlimited, unbounded, seemingly well-watered country, N.N.W., to call forth the exertions of the industrious agriculturist and grazier, for whose benefit the present labours of the party have been extended. This valley, which extends to the S.W. and W.S.W., has been named 'Hawkesbury Vale,' and the highest point of the range, bearing N.W. by W. from this tree, was called 'Mount Jenkinson,' the one a former title, and the other the family name of the noble earl whose present title the plains bear, and which, from the southern country, this gap affords the only passage likely to be discovered. The party in the earlier and middle stages of their expedition encountered many privations and local difficulties of travelling to, and in their return from the eastward; in spite, however, of these little evils, 'a hope at the bottom,' or, at this almost close of their journey, an encouragement induced them to persevere westerly a limited distance, and thus it was this passage was discovered. It has therefore been named 'Pandora's Pass.' Due east and west by compass from this tree, in a direct line (by odometrical admeasurement) were planted the fresh stones of peaches, brought from the colony in April last, with every good hope that their produce will one day or other afford some refreshment to the weary farmer, whilst on his route beyond the bourne of the desirable country north of Pandora's Pass. A like planting took place on the plains, twelve miles distance north at the last marked trees, with similar good wishes for their growth. A remarkably high mount above the pass east, being a guide to the traveller advancing south from the plains, has been named 'Direction Head.' The situation of this tree is as follows:--Latitude, observed on the 7th and 8th of June, 1832, 32 deg. 15 min. 19 sec. S; its longitude being presumed about 149 deg. 30 min. E. The party now proceed with the utmost despatch south for Bathurst. Buried for the information of the first farmer who may venture to advance so far to the northwards as this vale, of whom it is requested this document may not be destroyed, but carried to the settlement of Bathurst, after opening the bottle.

— Allan Cunningham's diary, 9 June 1823.

== See also ==
- List of mountain passes in New South Wales
