= Castlereagh River =

River in New South Wales, Australia

Coordinates: 30°12′S 147°32′E

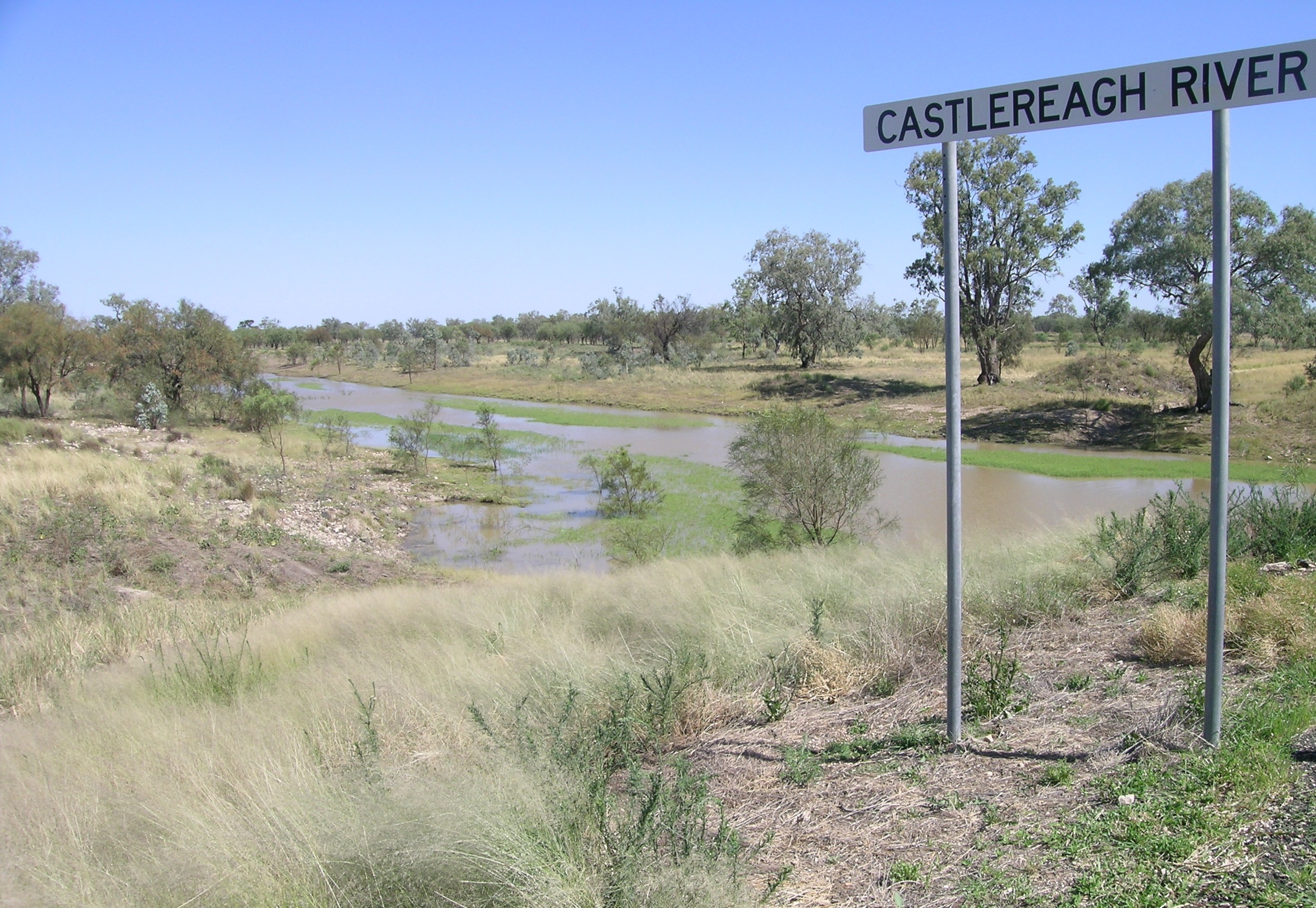
- The river seen from the Castlereagh Highway, south of Walgett, 2008
- Etymology: Lord Castlereagh
- Native name: Wallambangle

Location
- Country: Australia
- State: New South Wales
- Region: IBRA: Brigalow Belt South, Darling Riverine Plains
- District: Central West, Orana
- Municipalities: Warrumbungle, Gilgandra, Coonamble, Walgett

Physical characteristics
- Source: Warrumbungles
  - location: west of Coonabarabran
  - elevation: 630 m (2,070 ft)
- Mouth: confluence with the Macquarie River
  - location: west of Walgett
  - elevation: 121 m (397 ft)
- Length: 541 km (336 mi)

The Castlereagh River is located in the central–western district of New South Wales, Australia. It is part of the Macquarie-Castlereagh catchment within the Murray–Darling basin and is an unregulated river, meaning no dams or storage have been built on it to control flows.

On a map of NSW, the Castlereagh has a distinctive appearance among the north-western rivers: from upstream in the north at its confluence with the Macquarie River it extends southwards to a hook-shape, flattened-out at the base, which curves to the right (east and northwards) through to the tip of the hook in the Warrumbungle Mountains at the river's source.

The Castlereagh rises 20 km west of Coonabarabran in the heart of the Warrumbungle mountains at an elevation of about 850 metres. From its commencement upstream in the mountains the river initially flows east through the town of Coonabarabran. It then arcs round south and south-westerly to the village of Ulamambri, then south to Binnaway, and south-south-west to the small town of Mendooran which lies at the eastern side of the river's hook-shape. From there, the Castlereagh flows in a westerly direction at the flattened bottom of the hook and then turns north-westerly towards the town of Gilgandra.

From Gilgandra, it continues to run north-westerly across the plains through Gulargambone and Coonamble, then continuing across expansive plains, with no urban centres, where elevations are less than 200m, until it joins the Macquarie River at its uppermost reaches beyond the Macquarie Marshes. Its confluence with the Macquarie is about 65 km south-west of Walgett. Not far from the Castlereagh/Macquarie confluence the Macquarie itself joins the Barwon River about halfway between Walgett and Brewarrina.

Downstream from Gilgandra, the Castlereagh runs through alluvial plains, with alluvial soil that has been created from sediments being deposited over a long period of time by one or more rivers flowing down from highland regions. Groundwater is found in the alluvial sediments on the plains in the lower Castlereagh catchment and is generally associated with the ancient channel of the river. The Castlereagh has a very sandy bed throughout its course, with especially wide outer banks on the plains.

Charles Sturt, after travelling along the Castlereagh in 1828 from Coonamble to its junction with the Macquarie, noted that there was not one pebble or stone to be picked up in its bed, which was dry for the whole length he travelled.

Further upstream, the Castlereagh, Macquarie and Bogan rivers run "more or less parallel as they cross the plains, where creeks and streams break away from the main rivers, making connections between the Macquarie and the Bogan, the Macquarie and the Barwon, and the Castlereagh and the Barwon. As the waterways approach the Barwon River the interconnected streams, as well as lagoons and channels, support extensive flood-dependent woodlands and grasslands". In this extreme northern section of the catchment the floodplain between the Barwon and Castlereagh Rivers is intersected by Womat and Wanourie Creeks, which carry flows from the Barwon to the Castlereagh River during major floods.

Estimates of the length of the course of the Castlereagh River from its commencement to its mouth vary from 541 kilometres (336 mi), 549 km, and 566 km. Over its course it drops over 600 m.

== River flows ==
The Castlereagh River has a highly variable flow, and often has from very low flow to no flow at all. The sandy riverbed of the Castlereagh is frequently dry in many places. John Oxley's expedition of 1818 came across the Castlereagh near Coonamble running so high and fast that it was six days until water levels dropped sufficiently to allow the expeditionary party to cross. Ten years later Charles Sturt arrived in the same general area during a ravaging drought to find the Castlereagh dry, and continuing completely dry for miles on end downstream to its junction with the Macquarie River with only occasional waterholes to be found nearby.

Two claims are often anecdotally made about flows in the Castlereagh:

(i) Claim of the fastest flowing inland river in Australia.

(ii) Claim as an underground flowing river. In more recent times, it has also been called an "upside down river".

=== Flow velocity ===
The gradients of the upper reaches of the Castlereagh River and its tributaries are steep, located in the Warrumbungle Mountains and its foothills. In flood events, velocities can be dangerously high – a speed of 3 metres per second has been recorded at Coonabarabran. Additionally, the catchment area of the upper Castlereagh is criss-crossed with many streams and creeks flowing off the foothills, whose floodwater rushes with high velocity into the main river. Flow times downstream can vary greatly depending on the severity of flood. Flood peaks travelling between Coonabarabran and Gilgandra have been recorded taking as little as nine hours to travel the distance, and up to 47 hours. Usually in peak floods, the greater the water volume, the faster the travel times of the peak. However, the flattening of the terrain upstream of Coonamble results in decreased flow velocity (but means a greater area for the flow is needed to avoid flooding).

=== Underground flow ===
It is not correct that the Castlereagh River is an underground river (subterranean river) or an 'upside down' river. However, water that once was in the river bed on the surface does flow through the extensive sands under the riverbed. This water is therefore part of the underground soil, and is not separate from it as a truly underground river is separate from the soil. The fact of water existing under the riverbed was known by Europeans at least in the early part of the last quarter of the 1800s, if not before, as evidenced in statements given to the Water Conservation Commission Inquiry at Dubbo in 1885.

The below-ground sedimentary deposits in the area of the Great Artesian Basin are particularly good water stores (aquifers), and the highly permeable sediments below NSW's western flowing rivers create excellent aquifers. A theory of an extensive sub-artesian store of water was proposed by Mr James Samuels and published in the "Empire" of 27 and 28 August 1868, including a view that dry inland rivers would have water under the bed. Some pastoralists in western NSW paid attention and began to sink wells, often near rivers. This may have contributed to the idea of an underground flowing river in the largely empty above-ground Castlereagh.

The river contains wide alluvial sandbeds. Because the pore space between sand particles is large, water can easily move through the soil layer (i.e. the sand layer). This means the river's sandbeds can be described as highly permeable. (Permeability is measured by calculating the discharge rate at which water will be transported through the pore spaces of the material; the discharge rate being controlled by the hydraulic conductivity of the saturated material).

The Castlereagh River and the ground water of the Great Artesian Basin are highly connected. The water is not flowing as a separate and distinguishable underground river flow, but is moving initially through the permeable alluvial sandbeds and then through paleochannels to deeper groundwater aquifers.

The Castlereagh's alluvial sandbeds make up what is called the "hyperheic zone". This is the region of saturated sediment below, or adjacent to, a river where surface water and groundwater are actively mixing and exchanged. The movement of the groundwater in the Castlereagh through its alluvial sands is said to be a hyporheic process. In the Castlereagh, the further transit of surface water to the aquifers of the Great Artesian Basin is then enabled through the ancient paleochannels underlying the Castlereagh, and this water movement is a large-scale hyporheic process. (Hutchinson and Webster 1998).

== The Great Artesian Basin ==
The Castlereagh sits over the Great Artesian Basin (GAB) and within a re-charge area for the waters of the GAB (where the GAB waters are replenished from above ground). Areas of re-charge are divided into zones, called 'sources' and the Castlereagh River is within the Southern Recharge Groundwater Source. This source, together with the Eastern Recharge Groundwater Source, is characterised by better quality groundwater than other zones.

== Tributaries ==
The Castlereagh River is joined by dozens of minor tributaries in its journey towards the very upper Macquarie. The Major Rivers Database of NSW lists seventy streams, (including effluent streams that receive water from the river) of the Castlereagh.

On the upper reaches the most important tributaries, originating in the mountains or slopes, and joining the river before Ulamambri are: Shawn, Gundi, Billy Kings, Baby and Terrawinda Creeks. Above Binnaway are Jack Halls, Belar, Spring, Greenbah and Ulinda creeks, and between Binnaway and Mendooran are Chinamans, Greyholme, Piambra and Dinnykymine Creeks.

The section between Mendooran and Gilgandra has many creeks and waterways, and some of the tributaries are, from upper to lower section: Sand Creek and Borambil Creek, Wallumburawang Creek, Rocky Creek, Coondoomea Creek, Gidgenboyne Creek, Boyben Creek, Ryans Creek, Apple Tree Creek, Denmire Creek, Gum Creek, Sallabalah Creek, Rocky Creek; then Quandong Creek, Back Creek and Deep Creek near the area of Breelong, and Jumpers Creek just south of Gilgandra.

Between Gilgandra and Coonamble the tributaries are Ulamogo Creek joining the Castlereagh partway between Gilgandra and Curban, Terrabile Creek just near Curban, Gulargambone Creek at Gulargambone, Wilber Creek between Gulargambone and Combara, and Baronne Creek

At Coonamble, are Balagula Creek, Eurimie Creek and Warrena Creek. Downstream of Coonamble are Coolibah Creek, and Teridgerie Creek which rises in the Warrumbungles. The main tributaries on this section of river are Ulinda, Butheroo and Merrygoen creeks, as well as Kennedy's Creek and Duck Holes Creek further upstream near Wingadee.

== Aboriginal life on the Castlereagh ==
According to the colonial surveyor Thomas Mitchell in 1846, the original inhabitants called the river the Barr. The early Australian explorers named the river "The Castlereagh" (through explorer Oxley) only two hundred years ago in 1818.

River systems are fundamentally important to Aboriginal Australian people. As Professor Marcia Langton has described, the Aboriginal people's holistic view of the world creates connection to waterscapes as spiritual, social and jural spaces just as much as physical domains – just like the same principles that connect people to landscape. Established laws that come from the sacred ancestral past "allocate rights and interests among particular people, to water sources". These are "rights and responsibilities, according to religious principles." The Castlereagh River passes through hundreds of miles of country and several different nations of the Aboriginal people. Therefore, the rights regarding the Castlereagh may have been complex.

The source area of the river, from the Warrumbungles through to its down slopes area, encompassed the western edge of Kamilaroi /Gamilaraay country. The river's upper reaches around Mendooran and Gilgandra flow through the northern end of Wiradjuri country. Once past Gilgandra, the river flows into the area of the Wailwan people, across the plains and through to its lower reaches. Along the Castlereagh to around Coonamble, there was clearly overlap of these three groupings – Kamilaroi, Wiradjuri and Wailwan.

Europeans observed that, at Gilgandra near the long waterhole that existed on the Castlereagh, "the 'Coonabarabran' tribe (European-given name) of the Gamilaraay people camped on the eastern side of the river, and the Mole tribe of the Wiradjuri on the western side".

Evidence of Aboriginal culture was to be found all along the Castlereagh. Some caves in the Warrumbungle Ranges contain hand stencils, marked rocks and engravings. Rocks at Willow Vale in the Castlereagh River near the centre of Coonabarabran have grinding grooves on them.

=== Written record of Aboriginal people ===
The first European record of Aboriginal people along the Castlereagh came through the John Oxley exploration party of 1818. Waiting for waters in the Castlereagh near present-day Coonamble to recede, Oxley wrote on 27 July 1818 that "Natives appear to be numerous; their guniahs (or bark-huts) are in every direction, and by their fire-places several muscle-shells of the same kind as those found on the Lachlan and Macquarie Rivers were seen. Game (kangaroos and emus), frequenting the dry banks of the river, were procured in abundance." At the time, Oxley's party was camped at the banks of the Castlereagh River, and the spot is today marked with a memorial stone 2 km north of the town. After finally crossing the river on 3 August and heading easterly towards the Warrumbungle mountains, Oxley wrote the next day: "The natives appear pretty numerous: one was very daring, maintaining his ground at a distance armed with a formidable jagged spear and club, which he kept beating against each other, making the most singular gestures and noises that can be imagined: he followed us upwards of a mile, when he left us, joining several companions to the right of us. Emus and kangaroos abound, and there is a great diversity of birds, some of which have the most delightful notes, particularly the thrush."

Charles Sturt was leading a European exploring party in 1828 when he travelled along the Castlereagh from a point just near Coonamble all the way downstream to its junction with the Macquarie River, and thence to the Darling River. His record of his journey refers to several friendly encounters with different Aboriginal groups who gave his party assistance on these lower reaches. He found that they were generally in severe want because of drought, and considered that they were perishing from famine.

The exploratory journey of Oxley brought the area of the Castlereagh to the attention of pastoralists. The rich soils along the upper Castlereagh from Mendooran to Coonamble appealed to pastoralists for cattle raising and from the early 1830s Aboriginal people encountered Europeans moving into their country. Europeans were clearly present as early as 1832 at least (see "European history" below). So commenced a struggle for Aboriginal people to access resources as they once had, and to survive in their traditional way.

=== European impact on Aboriginal life ===
In a very short period – of possibly not more than a dozen years – the Aboriginal way of life on the Castlereagh was heavily curtailed. Written evidence in 1841 from pastoralist James Walker showed this, in his response to a circular from the Commissioner of Crown Lands enquiring about pastoralists' interactions with Aborigines. Walker lived at Wallerawang, near Lithgow, but held many pastoral licences over vast stations in the Castlereagh River area from Mendooran (where 'Pampoo' was located) to Coonamble. His response included a single, but telling, comment on the effect of European occupation on Aborigines: "... since stock was first taken out there [i.e. to the Castlereagh] we have abridged all their natural sources of existence."

Even prior to the 1840s some Aboriginal people were working for the pastoralists along the Castlereagh. In his written 1841 response, James Walker also reported that there were usually four or five Aborigines employed on his breeding herd station on the Castlereagh, and that "they milk the cows, bring them home in the evening &c and generally remain on the spot, performing many services which it would be almost impossible now to get white people to do." He also said that those employed on his stations perform valuable services "looking up stray cattle, and breaking in heifers to milk &c for which they received milk, flour and meat and occasionally tobacco, tea and sugar, they get all the food they require while they remain".

James Walker claimed that there were good relations with the Aboriginal people of the Castlereagh River: "... they like uncontrolled liberty and freedom, amongst themselves they appear to have few restraints, they are acute, intelligent and shrewd, and well disposed". Walker appears to take a benign approach to the Castlereagh Aboriginals, possibly because they caused him no problems as a pastoralist. But despite acknowledging that Europeans had "abridged all [Aborigines'] natural sources of existence", Walker expressed the convenient belief that "they appear satisfied to receive our food in exchange for services occasionally rendered us." This showed a spectacular lack of concern about the true effects of alienating Aborigines from their land. The Land Commissioner did not seek to interview the Aborigines themselves about what this really meant for them.

More early evidence of the Aborigines mixing and/or working with European shepherds and labourers at the Castlereagh came in 1840 from a ticket-of-leave man named William Jones who was then an umbrella maker in Sussex St, Sydney. Jones had agreed to be interpreter in the trial of a Wiradjuri man from the Lachlan River who was not charged under his own name but under the European nickname of "Neville's Billy". William Jones deposed that the language of the prisoner "was the same as that spoken on the banks of the Castlereagh River about three hundred miles from Sydney where he, Jones, had been for about eight years, and where he had learned the language."

In July 1848, surveyor George Boyle White was tracing the course of the Castlereagh. He noted in his diary that new young cypress trees were growing thickly in an area around Rouse's station ('Breelong') and before he'd got to Merritt's ('Eringanerin') and commented that if there wasn't a fire through there it would become a thick scrub in 20 years. It is possible White was observing the environmental effects of the Aborigines no longer being able to carry out periodic burning of the land as they once always had, so that even by 1848 the landscape was changing. He also recorded at another time that he had not seen any Aborigines along the way, although he did encounter some near Curban and at the Warrumbungle Mountains.

The incursion of European men to the Castlereagh resulted in many of them having relationships with Aboriginal women, whether welcomed or otherwise. This lead further to breakdown of Aboriginal traditional life and social cohesion, and often resulted in children for whom the European father might or might not have taken responsibility. The squatter John Jude was one such example. An ex-convict with a family in England, he had gone in the mid-1830s to the area of Armatree near the Castlereagh. In 1841 a local Aboriginal woman bore his daughter, named Eliza Jude, who was murdered in 1859 aged 18.

Aboriginal people continued working for the pastoralists along the Castlereagh through into the 1850s and 1860s, and this was shown with occasional references in the press. See for example "Jackey, a native lad of about seventeen" who was reported in 1852 to have "for years been in the service of Mr Fitzsimmons of 'Gora', Castlereagh River." 'Gora' station was at the foot of the Warrumbuungles, near Bugaldie.

Increasing pressure on the resources the Aboriginal people needed for their way of life made them more dependent on Europeans and exposed them to European vices. At the beginning of 1853 when a station worker was murdered by his wife near Curban at the Castlereagh, the hutkeepers and shepherds present had been drinking heavily, supplied by a "sly grog" seller but also present at a fireplace with the deceased were "two black gins lying at his feet and some blackfellows lying beside him".

Aboriginal people were camping along the river at the start of 1874 when the great flood came. At Gilgandra, an aboriginal woman and her young son were assisted by innkeeper Mrs Hannah Morris to flee their camp at the river bank as the water rose around them. Eventually, the people camped more permanently at Gilgandra at a place along the river near the race course. At Coonabarabran in 1894 Mary Jane Cain lobbied to have her ownership of her small 400-acre selection, called "Burra Bee Dee", recognised as a place for her people, and others freely moved there. At Gulargambone, the banks of the river became a semi-permanent camping place for Aboriginal people, but by 1892 it was gazetted as an Aboriginal Reserve under the Aborigines Protection Board.

Despite European occupation, the Aboriginal people of the Castlereagh did manage to keep some of their traditional practices and beliefs alive to the end of the C19th. R.H. Matthews, a government surveyor who worked for twenty years in north-west NSW and became a documenter of Aboriginal life and culture, recorded that "in 1893 there was a great gathering of the local Aboriginal people of the Castlereagh with the people of the Macquarie, the Bogan and the Barwon Rivers for a great initiation ceremony".

== European history ==
=== First contacts ===
The first non-Aboriginal person to encounter the Castlereagh River was George Evans travelling in 1818 with the exploration party of Surveyor-General John Oxley. George Evans was Oxley's assistant for the tour of exploration. The group had departed from Bathurst in May 1818, sent by Governor Macquarie to explore the Macquarie River. This expedition would follow the Macquarie River to a point where it was unable to keep tracking it any further, and so would turn east away from the Macquarie, finally ending up on the coast at Port Macquarie.

In early July, the party returned from the Macquarie Marshes to Mt Harris, 48 km (30 miles) N-NW of present-day Warren. Seemingly unable to further follow the course of the Macquarie, Oxley had to change his plans. He decided to send Evans ahead, with a small party, to scout a north-easterly route across the plains, and report back. Beginning on 8 July 1818, Evans would end up traversing a large loop, north-easterly then south-easterly, then westerly and back to his starting point. In the north-easterly direction, he first crossed the Castlereagh River around Combara, between Gulargambone and Coonamble. The party then continued on a shallower east-north-easterly direction until reaching the foothills of the Warrumbungle Mountains. From here, Evans turned south-westerly to head back to Oxley's encampment at Mt. Harris, travelling across 'an open plain, over which was rather better travelling than we had latterly experienced'. This route brought his party back to the Castlereagh River at a point south of his first crossing, in an area between the future villages of Armatree and Curban (10 miles apart). As he approached the Castlereagh River he described the country as 'low and wet', with the journey being 'dreadfully bad and marshy'. The country he was crossing over is today considered rich pasture and farming land, covering the areas known as Tonderbrine, the western side of Tooraweenah, the Yarrandale area and Hillside.

The scouting party got back to Oxley's encampment at Mt. Harris on 18 July 1818. On the same day, Oxley named the river in honour of the British Foreign Secretary, Lord Castlereagh, who had been in that role since 1812. The whole group then departed the following day for the river that George Evans had crossed, heading in the same north-easterly direction that Evans had taken. On 27 July 1818 they reached the Castlereagh, but the land they traversed to get there was flooded, whereas it had not been flooded two weeks earlier on Evans's scouting trip. The Castlereagh itself was running high, and they were not able to cross it for another six days.

Finally, on 2 August the river level had dropped sufficiently for the whole party to cross. The explorers continued to follow the south-easterly direction from their crossing Evans had taken two weeks before, to reach the Warrumbungles. However, now the party continued easterly through the Goorianawa Gap and eventually reached the coast.

=== Early pastoralist runs ===
From the 1830s, pastoralists began squatting on the Castlereagh, commonly moving north-westerly from the Mudgee area moving cattle onto land along the river, cared for by employed men who were often assigned convicts or ex-convicts. The area was at that time outside the official nineteen counties limits of settlement. This meant that pastoralists sending their stock westwards were technically squatting illegally, taking the land for free. In these early days it was mostly the established pastoralists who had access to land information through their friends and contacts in the highest government levels, and who had sufficient capital to own stock already, or buy more, and who were able to send animals and men up-country with supplies for long periods. By 1836, the government had realised that keeping settlement within specified areas (thereby limiting its own obligations) was a lost cause. It therefore established a system of pastoral licences requiring the payment of a licence fee and capping the size of individual pastoral 'runs' at 16,000 acres. Existing squatters overcame the size limitation by dividing their stations into different areas of 16,000 acres each.

Europeans were occupying the Castlereagh at least by early 1832. That year, Robert Lowe of Mudgee sent cattle to an area between Gilgandra and Curban on a run he named as "Yalcogrin", also fed by Ulomogo Creek, a tributary of the Castlereagh. In 1840, convict William Jones gave testimony in court that he had been on the Castlereagh River for eight years and learnt the language of the local people (Wiradjuri); if this was not an exaggeration then he had gone there in 1831 or 1832.

In 1834, Andrew Brown explored the area near the Warrumbungles for his employer James Walker of Wallerawang, with the assistance of local Aboriginal people, and established several cattle runs, having already established "Cuigan" up from Mundooran at least in 1836. In 1837 Brown applied for simply an area in northern district of Bligh at Big River. In 1837 Robert Bennett applied for "Brumbel' or 'Briamble" on 'Big River' and in about 1839, he occupied "Kirban" station (adjoining Robert Lowe's 'Yalcogrin') which became the present-day Curban area. In 1836, ex-convict John Jude took up "Carlingangong" or "Carlingoinggoing" with John Hall, and then applied for 'Armatree' in 1839. There was a flurry of licence applications in 1836 when squatting was legalised and individual runs were set at a maximum of 16,000 acres with the requirement that licence fees be paid. This indicates that at least some of the applicants were already operating in the region: from the area of Mendooran downstream, Richard Rouse applied for "Mundooran", and for Breelong, Thomas Perrie for Eringanerin (later held in 1848 by John Meritt), and James Bennett at "Bearbong" as well as Curban, Robert Lowe already had Yalcogrin, and applied for Carlganda and James Lowe in 1839 for "Warree" further down past Armatree, where Andrew Brown had yet another run "Illamurgalia". Gibson and Patterson established 'Canamble' run for James Walker's ownership in 1840. Cox Brothers and WC Wentworth also took up licences.

=== Ordinary life ===
The overseers or managers on the runs lived very frugally in simple huts. Settlements developed around river crossings, with an inn often established as a staging post for horses, and possibly a store. Post offices, often unofficial would be established, and became the point from which mail coaches left. Mails were to run once a week from Mudgee to Mendooran on the Castlereagh as from 1 January 1852. Mendooran was the oldest village on the Castlereagh, but did not officially become a gazetted town until 1859. It became an important centre, with Coonamble developing as the other large centre, and Curban an early village central to the locals while Gilgandra had not developed greatly before its bridge was built in 1878.

=== Mapping the Castlereagh ===
In 1848 a well regarded Surveyor, George Boyle White, 'traced' or mapped a large section of the Castlereagh from Binnaway to about Gulargambone. White had previously been employed by the government as a surveyor for twelve years, and had accompanied Surveyor-General Mitchell on an interior surveying expedition. White had a particular interest in surveying rivers and in 1847 Mitchell gave him a general remit to go over the mountains and "start the feature survey of that part of the colony", in order to "traverse the water courses and ranges that they may be charted." The first river he started on was the Castlereagh.

White reached his starting point by heading west from his home near Singleton via Cassilis and then NW up the Weetalibah Creek (now named Binnia Creek) till he reached the confluence of that creek with the river (noting that Henry Bailey's run of "Miangulliah" was opposite this point). He started surveying about five miles upstream from this confluence, on 19 June 1848, walking all the way along the Castlereagh. He had with him a small supporting party of men (carrying equipment, measuring with chains, setting up tents, preparing meals) and his teenage son, Henry. White marked and numbered trees each mile along the way. As he proceeded downstream, he noted the pastoral stations he came to, recording first that of Andrew Brown,(Caigan was on the Castlereagh near Binnaway, and Biamble adjacent to it nearer Mendooran) who supplied him with meat for the expedition, and then James Walker's old "Pampoo", followed by "Mrs Hassall's Banduleah" (actually 'Bundalla', on the northern side of the river).

== Floods ==
When John Oxley, Surveyor-General of NSW, got to the Castlereagh River, just near Coonamble, with his exploring party on 27 July 1818, it was running a banker on its inside banks. He wrote: "The river during the night had risen upwards of eight feet; and still continued rising with surprising rapidity, running at the rate of from five to six miles per hour, bringing down with it great quantities of driftwood and other wreck. The islands were all deeply covered, and the whole scene was peculiarly grand and interesting." Oxley's description could be applied to most of the many floods in the river over the following 200 years.

Floods in the Castlereagh are common. Rain in the Warrumbungles raises the water level in the river bed, and tributary streams sourced in the hills and slopes of the upper catchment pour more water downstream, with a fast flow created due to the steepness of the ranges. The townships of Binnaway, Mendooran and Gilgandra are inundated only in more severe flood events. Lower parts of Coonamble township have been inundated from time to time even in lesser floods. Flood levee banks have been erected on the upstream side of the town. Since 1870, (when there was an inundating flood at Coonamble), Coonabrabran township has been little affected by flooding. The worst floods since European occupation – having the greatest impact on human settlement and economic activity – were in 1874, and 1955.

In 1910 heavy floods caused flooding in Mendooran township and in July 1920, houses in low areas along the Castlereagh in Gilgandra township lying north and south of the commercial main strip were badly flooded, but the main street avoided inundation with the river peaking one foot below the height of the town's bridge. Townspeople in older areas were required by police to evacuate their homes for higher ground but they, too, avoided being flooded.

Recently, in January 2010, major flooding along the river inundated more than 400 rural properties. Fodder drops were needed and some livestock had to be moved.

=== 1874 flood ===
A devastating flood in January 1874 killed thousands of head of livestock, and damaged many buildings in Binnaway, Mendooran, Gilgandra and Coonamble. There had been incessant rain in the area of the Upper Castlereagh for three weeks (most of January) leading up to the day the river broke its banks. Over the same few days severe floods also occurred on other river systems: flooding on the Talbragar River at Dubbo was the worst experienced to that time, the town of Singleton was completely flooded, Maitland was flooded, as was Cassilis. On Saturday, 24 January, the Castlereagh River commenced rising rapidly, with rain falling heavily all day. During Sunday, 25 January the river continued rising and at Gilgandra on Monday 26th at 5 p.m. it had attained its full height. It was reported from Binnaway that the Castlereagh rose 28 feet in seven hours from 5am till twelve, and a great many sheep were lost in the area. At Mendooran, the townspeople took refuge in the loft of the stables at the Royal Hotel. The flood destroyed many of Binnaway's buildings.

At Coonamble, houses, stores, hotels and the public school were flooded. There was a "terrific current" in the flood waters and "it rushes by with a noise resembling the surging of the sea at a distance." People considered in any danger were rescued by boat or horseback. On the day of the flood, many settlers from the Coonamble area were in the town for land Appraisement Court hearings and the flood meant many of them could not leave for up to a week. At Gilgandra the flood broke the banks in the middle of the night and it was reported that, while it was "hard to tell the immense amount of damage done on the whole river, but what has occurred here is sufficiently disastrous". The inn owned and run by Mrs Hannah Morris had existed many years but had been newly re-built six months prior. It was completely washed away. All those at the inn got out as the waters were rising in the building, heading some distance to the police paddock located on a rise to the north of the village. The Johnstone family, newly arrived one week, were camped in their tents to take up the 'Castlereagh' run located on flats on the western side of the river immediately to the north of the small village of Gilgandra. They lost almost all their 800 sheep, most of their cattle and all their belongings, only saving themselves by climbing up a large native apple tree and tying their young children to its branches with ropes so they wouldn't fall in. Thirty years later Mrs Johnstone recalled the dreadful din of the water and the huge number of dead animals, parts of buildings, and fencing being carried downstream on the swirling floodwaters. At Ulomogo (then a very small village located between Gilgandra and Gulargambone) Mrs Goodal and her family, of the Ulomogo hotel, narrowly escaped but her manager, (surname said to be Newland) was drowned while returning to the hotel to collect items.

A poem about the flood on the Castlereagh was penned by a local person, (name of author not found). The poem was known and recited by locals for decades, and sometimes it was sung, as reported across different decades after the flood:

=== 1955 flood ===
The 1955 flood, in February, was the most severe in European history. This flood was due to extreme cyclonic weather conditions in northern Australia.

== See also ==
- List of rivers of Australia
