= Gwabegar railway line =

Railway line in New South Wales, Australia

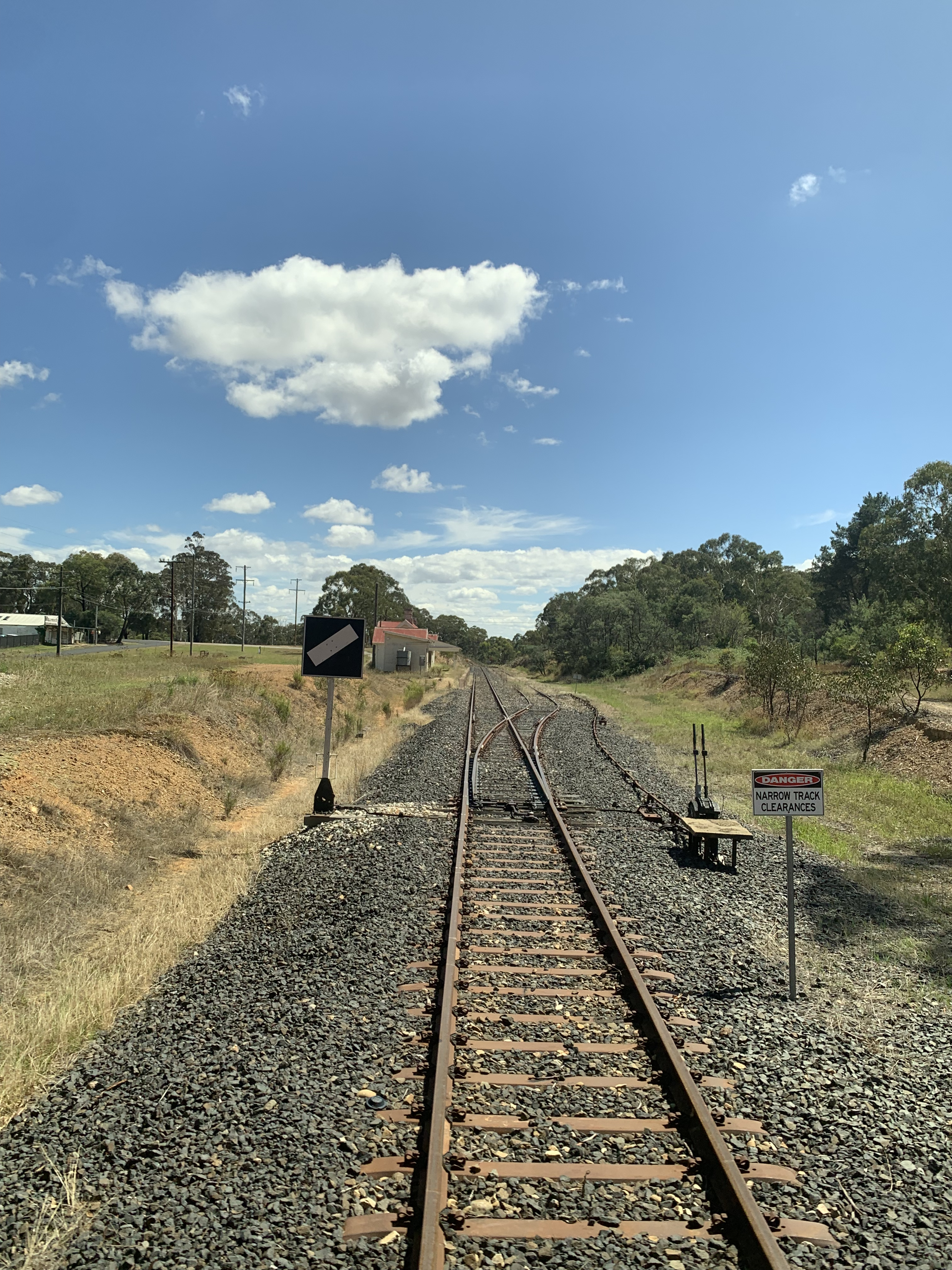
- The Gwabegar line through Clandulla

Overview
- Owner: Transport Asset Manager of New South Wales
- Termini: Wallerawang; Gwabegar

Service
- Operator(s): ARTC, UGL CRN

History
- Opened: 10 September 1923

Technical
- Line length: 431.7 km (268.2 mi)
- Track gauge: 1,435 mm (4 ft 8 1/2 in)
- Signalling: Train Order Working north of Baal Bone Junction
- Train protection system: Train Management and Control System north of Baal Bone Junction

The Gwabegar railway line is a railway line in the Central West and North West Slopes of New South Wales, Australia, which passes through the towns of Mudgee, Gulgong, Dunedoo, Coonabarabran and terminates at Gwabegar.

The section from Wallerawang to Capertee was opened on 15 May 1882; the section from Capertee to Rylstone on 9 June 1884; the section from Rylstone to Mudgee on 10 September 1884; the section from Mudgee to Gulgong on 14 April 1909; the section from Gulgong to Dunedoo on 28 November 1910; the section from Dunedoo to Binnaway on 2 April 1917; the section from Binnaway to Coonabarabran on 11 June 1917; and the section from Coonabarabran to Gwabegar on 10 September 1923.

Currently, the Gwabegar Line is operational between Wallerawang to Rylstone and between Gulgong and Binnaway. The line beyond Rylstone to Gulgong and from Binnaway towards the terminus at Gwabegar still remains booked out of use and rail traffic remains suspended.

The section of the line between Kandos and Rylstone was restored in 2018 to operate heritage trains between the two railway stations.

== Description ==
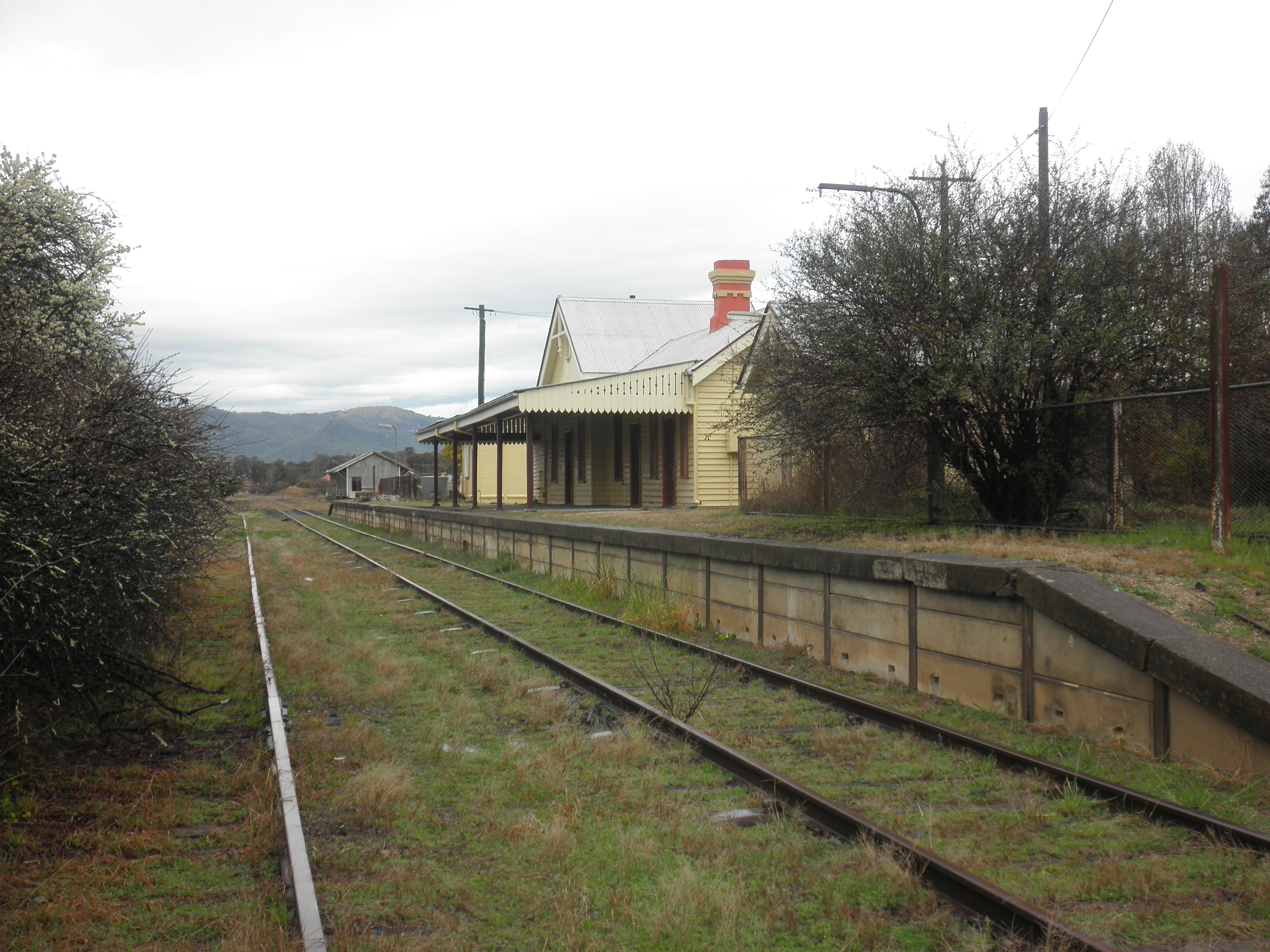
Rylstone railway station prior to its 2018 reopening

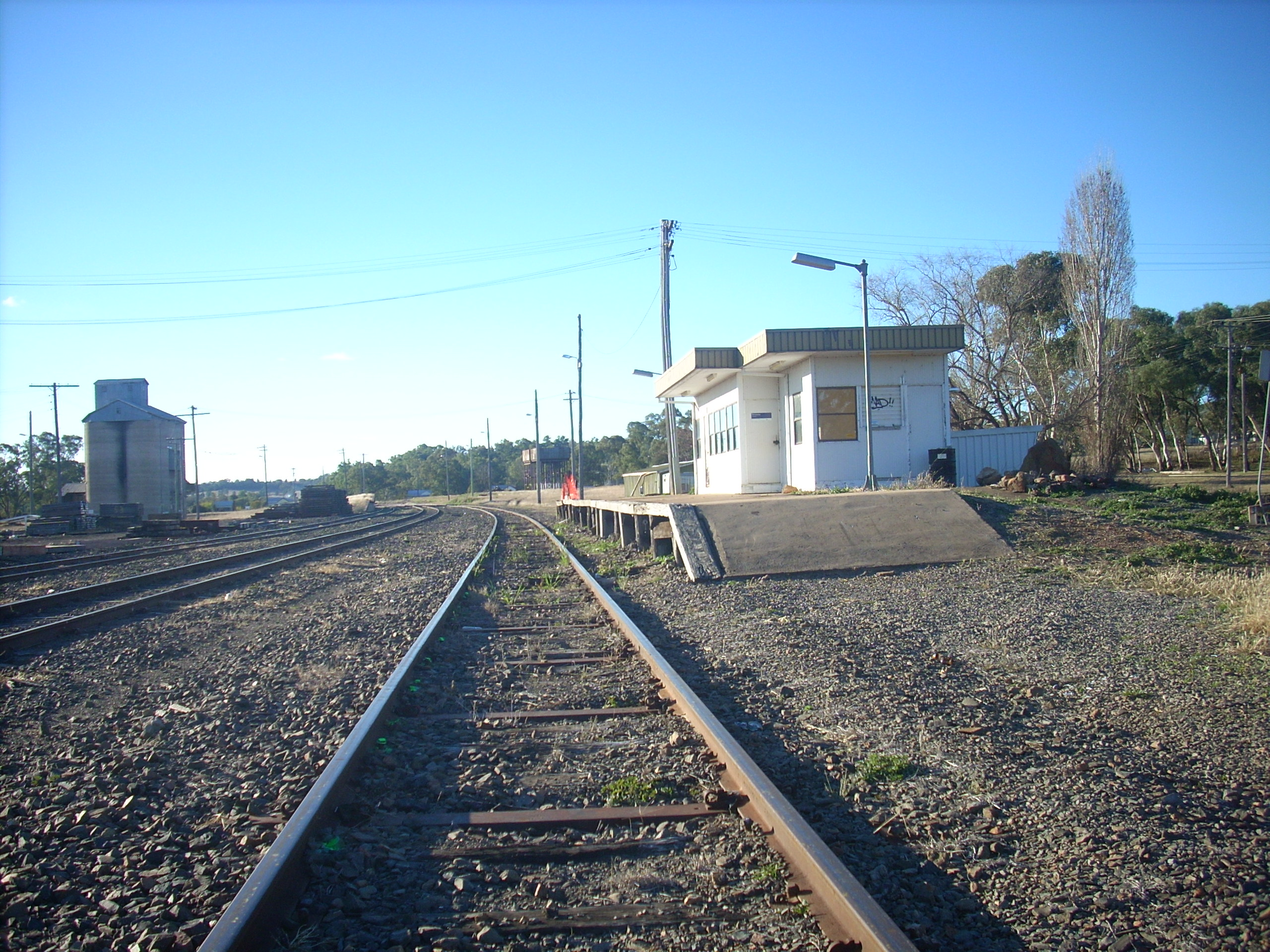
Binnaway station in 2011

The line branches from the Main Western line at Wallerawang and heads north through the towns of Kandos, Rylstone and Mudgee before reaching Gulgong, where there is also a junction to the Sandy Hollow to Gulgong Line.

For several years, the section between Kandos and Gulgong was used only for a monthly heritage train service, subject to heavy speed restrictions. The line had previously been closed from 2 March 1992 until 2 September 2000 but was reopened after repairs.

In May 2007, RIC announced that rail traffic between Kandos and Gulgong would be suspended from use effective 30 June 2007. Rail traffic on the Gwabegar Line was subsequently suspended north of Airly Colliery to Gulgong, however charter services were able to operate conditionally as far as Kandos and sometimes Rylstone. Rail traffic on the section between Binnaway and Gwabegar was suspended 28 October 2005 by the Rail Infrastructure Corporation (RIC) citing safety concerns arising from degraded infrastructure.

In February 2016, the section from Kandos to Rylstone was reopened for a heritage 660/720 class railcar trip from Lithgow.

On 24 October 2017 the NSW State Government announced that $1.1 million would be provided to reinstate an 8 km section of the Line between Kandos and Rylstone, enabling the Kandos Museum, Lachlan Valley Railway and Lithgow State Mines Railway to run tourist trains in the section. Refurbishment work, which includes replacing 3,500 old timber sleepers with long-life steel, commenced in 2018 and continued for several months. The restored section of the line was officially opened on 29 September 2018.

== Services ==
Primary traffic on the line today is coal trains from the Airly Colliery following the closures of the Baal Bone and Charbon collieries. Coal operations were initiated by the State Rail Authority at Baal Bone in July 1986 and at Charbon in December 1986. Charbon Colliery closed in 2015. Mining activities ceased at Baal Bone in 2011. The only remaining coal activity north of Wallerawang is at Airly Colliery.

Cement from Kandos Cement Works was a regular source of traffic until the work's closure in 2011.

Grain was formerly shipped from silos at locations such as Gwabegar, Baradine, and Bugaldie, on the now closed section of line north of Binnaway. Silos continue in use at locations such as Neilrex and Birriwa. The flour mill sidings at Gulgong are no longer connected to the line.

Passenger services from Lithgow to Gulgong via Mudgee were operated with 620/720 rail cars, then DEB sets until their replacement with coaches in the early 1980s.

Commencing in 2018, with the restoration of the Kandos-Rylstone section, Lachlan Valley Railway and Lithgow State Mine Railway regularly operate their heritage train services between Lithgow and Rylstone, with shuttles between Rylstone and Kandos.
