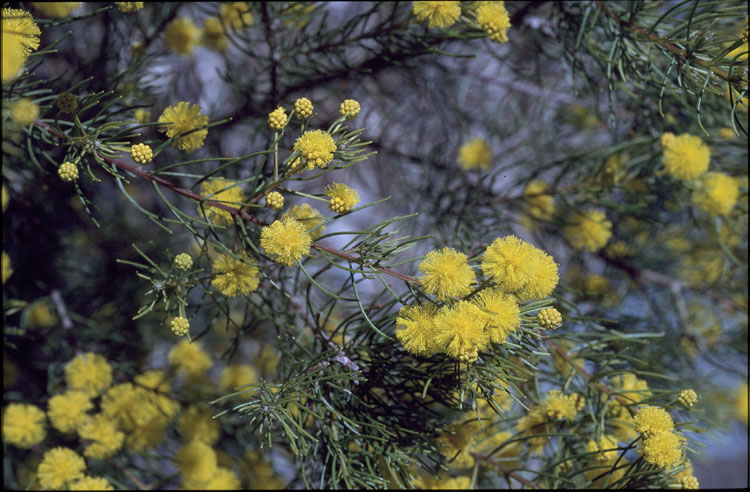
- In the Mount Annan Botanic Gardens

Conservation status
- Vulnerable (NCA)

Scientific classification
- Kingdom: Plantae
- Clade: Tracheophytes
- Clade: Angiosperms
- Clade: Eudicots
- Clade: Rosids
- Order: Fabales
- Family: Fabaceae
- Subfamily: Caesalpinioideae
- Clade: Mimosoid clade
- Genus: Acacia
- Species: A. hockingsii

Binomial name
- Acacia hockingsii Pedley
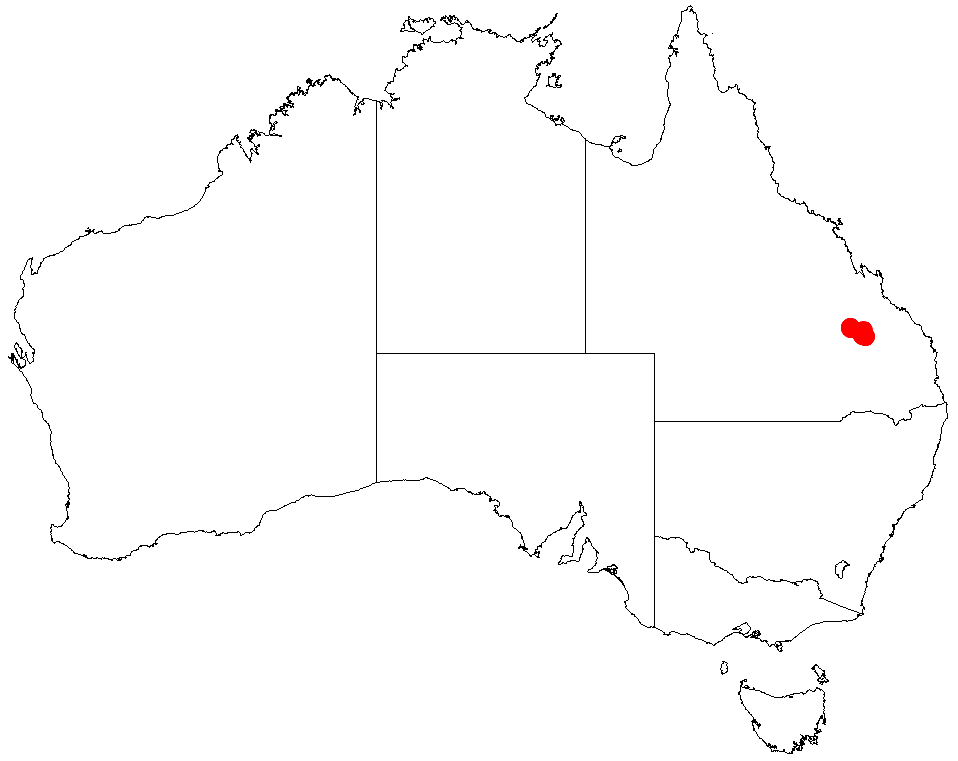
- Occurrence data from AVH

Synonyms
- Racosperma hockingsii (Pedley) Pedley

= Acacia hockingsii =

Hocking's wattle

Species of legume

Acacia hockingsii, also known as Hocking's wattle, is a species of flowering plant in the family Fabaceae and is endemic to a small area in the central highlands of Queensland, Australia. It is a rounded, glabrous shrub with ascending to erect, linear, slightly curved phyllodes, spherical heads of about thirty flowers, and narrowly oblong to linear, firmly papery pods.

== Description ==
Acacia hockingsii is a rounded, glabrous, somewhat sticky shrub that typically grows to a height of up to about 3 m (9.8 ft) and has reddish young shoots. Its phyllodes are ascending to erect, narrowly linear and slightly curved to slightly s-shaped, 60–100 mm (2.4–3.9 in) long and usually 2–3 mm (0.079–0.118 in) wide, narrowed towards the base with a linear gland usually 0.5–1.5 mm (0.020–0.059 in) long, 1.5–4 mm (0.059–0.157 in) above the pulvinus. The flowers are borne in a spherical head in axils on a peduncle 3–5 mm (0.12–0.20 in) long with about 30 deep golden yellow flowers. Flowering mostly occurs in September, and the pods are narrowly oblong to linear, firmly papery, up to 80 mm (3.1 in) long, 5–7 mm (0.20–0.28 in) wide and convex over the seeds. The seeds are oblong to egg-shaped, 2.5–3.5 mm (0.098–0.138 in) long.

== Taxonomy ==
Acacia hockingsii was first formally described in 1980 by Leslie Pedley in the journal Austrobaileya from specimens collected by Francis David Hockings in Isla Gorge in 1963. The specific epithet honours the collector of the type specimen.

This species belongs to the Acacia johnsonii group along with A. eremophiloides, A. gnidium and A. ixodes but can be distinguished by its longer phyllodes. Another member of the group, A. islana is also only found in Isla Gorge and but has much shorter phyllodes. It also resembles A. sabulosa.

== Distribution and habitat ==
Hocking's wattle is found in the central highland of Queensland, north of Taroom where it is found in shallow soils on sandstone in Eucalyptus woodland. It was formerly thought to be restricted to the Isla Gorgearea, but recently it has been found south of Isla Gorge near Wondekai Nature Reserve and another population has been found in Palmgrove National Park.

== Conservation status ==
Acacia hockingsii is listed as "vulnerable" under the Queensland Government Nature Conservation Act 1992.

== See also ==
- List of Acacia species
