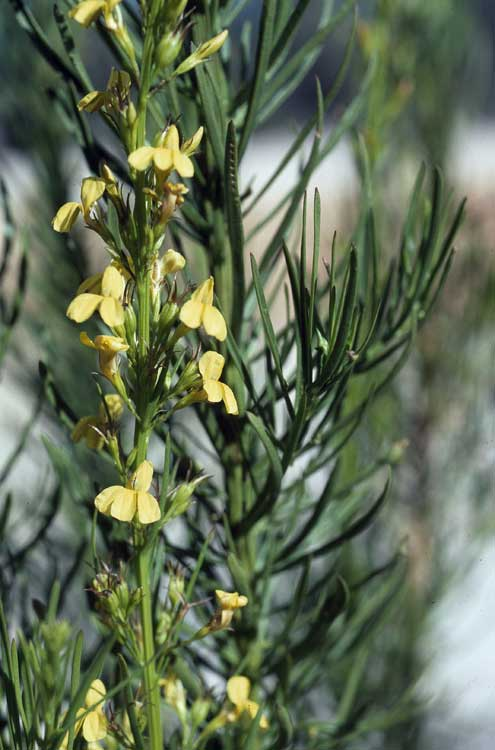
- Goodenia racemosa

Scientific classification
- Kingdom: Plantae
- Clade: Tracheophytes
- Clade: Angiosperms
- Clade: Eudicots
- Clade: Asterids
- Order: Asterales
- Family: Goodeniaceae
- Genus: Goodenia
- Species: G. racemosa

Binomial name
- Goodenia racemosa F.Muell.

= Goodenia racemosa =

Species of plant

Goodenia racemosa is a species of flowering plant in the family Goodeniaceae and is endemic to Queensland. It is an erect undershrub with linear or narrow oblong leaves and racemes of vivid yellow flowers.

== Description ==
Goodenia racemosa is an erect, mostly glabrous undershrub that typically grows to a height of up to 120 cm (47 in). The leaves on the stems are linear to narrow oblong, 35–60 mm (1.4–2.4 in) long and 2–10 mm (0.079–0.394 in) wide. The flowers are arranged in thyrses or racemes up to 150 mm (5.9 in) long with linear bracts mostly about 10 mm (0.39 in) long. Each flower is on a pedicel about 3 mm (0.12 in) long, and the sepals are linear, about 5 mm (0.20 in) long. The corolla is vivid yellow, 12–15 mm (0.47–0.59 in) long, the lower lobes 5–7 mm (0.20–0.28 in) long with wings 1.2–1.5 mm (0.047–0.059 in) wide. Flowering occurs from September to December and the fruit is a spherical to oval capsule, 4–5 mm (0.16–0.20 in) long.

== Taxonomy and naming ==
Goodenia racemosa was first formally described in 1859 by Ferdinand von Mueller in Fragmenta Phytographiae Australiae from specimens collected near the Burnett River.

In 1990, Roger Charles Carolin described G. racemosa var. latifolia and the name and that of the autonym are accepted by the Australian Plant Census:

- Goodenia racemosa var. latifolia Carolin has narrow oblong leaves 7–10 mm (0.28–0.39 in) wide;
- Goodenia racemosa F.Muell. var. racemosa has linear leaves about 4 mm (0.16 in) wide. The subspecies name (latifolia) means "wide leaf".

== Distribution and habitat ==
The latifolia variety grows in rocky situations in Isla Gorge and the autonym is found on the Carnarvon Range and Blackdown Tableland.

== Conservation status ==
Both varieties of G. racemosa are listed as of "least concern" under the Queensland Government Nature Conservation Act 1992.
