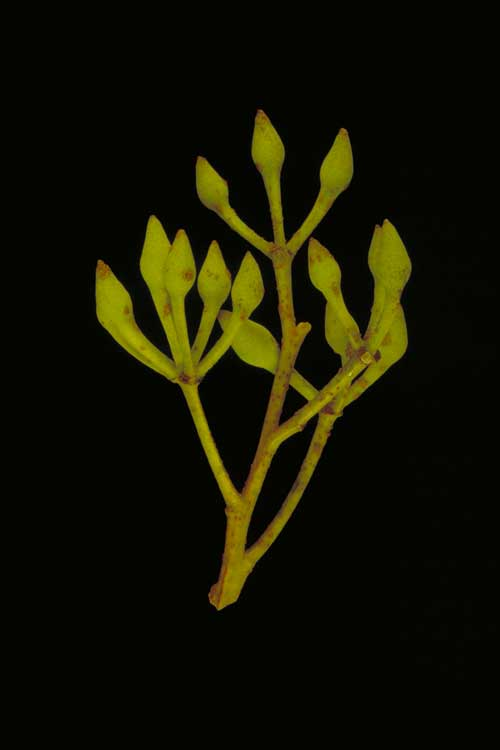
- Flower buds of Eucalyptus rubiginosa
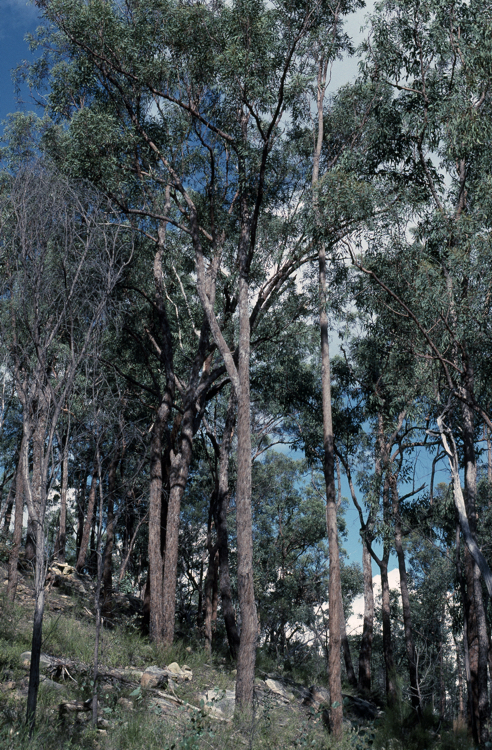
- Full tree

Scientific classification
- Kingdom: Plantae
- Clade: Tracheophytes
- Clade: Angiosperms
- Clade: Eudicots
- Clade: Rosids
- Order: Myrtales
- Family: Myrtaceae
- Genus: Eucalyptus
- Species: E. rubiginosa

Binomial name
- Eucalyptus rubiginosa Brooker

= Eucalyptus rubiginosa =

Species of eucalyptus

Eucalyptus rubiginosa is a species of tree that is endemic to Queensland. It has rough, fibrous bark, lance-shaped or curved adult leaves that are paler on the lower surface, flower buds in groups of nine or eleven, white flowers and cup-shaped or hemispherical fruit.

== Description ==
Eucalyptus rubiginosa is a tree that typically grows to a height of 15–20 m (49–66 ft) and forms a lignotuber. It has thick, rough, fibrous, reddish brown bark on the trunk and branches more than about 20 mm (0.79 in) thick. Young plants and coppice regrowth have narrow lance-shaped leaves that are dull green, paler on the lower surface, 100–150 mm (3.9–5.9 in) long and 15–30 mm (0.59–1.18 in) wide. Adult leaves are arranged alternately, dark green on the upper surface, paler below, lance-shaped or curved, 70–150 mm (2.8–5.9 in) long and 10–30 mm (0.39–1.18 in) wide tapering to a petiole 8–20 mm (0.31–0.79 in) long. The flower buds are arranged on the ends of branchlets in groups of nine or eleven on a branched peduncle 5–26 mm (0.20–1.02 in) long, the individual buds on pedicels 5–10 mm (0.20–0.39 in) long. Mature buds are oval, 8–11 mm (0.31–0.43 in) long and 4–7 mm (0.16–0.28 in) wide with a conical operculum. Flowering occurs between September and November and the flowers are white. The fruit is a woody cup-shaped or hemispherical capsule 6–9 mm (0.24–0.35 in) long and 9–12 mm (0.35–0.47 in) wide with the valves near rim level.

== Taxonomy and naming ==
Eucalyptus rubiginosa was first formally described in 1984 by Ian Brooker in the journal Australian Forest Research. The specific epithet (rubiginosa) is from the Latin word rubiginosus meaning "rusty red", referring to the colour of the bark of this tree.

== Distribution and habitat ==
This tree grows over sandstone in forest and woodland mainly between Bauhinia Downs and Theodore especially in the Isla Gorge National Park but also in the Barakula State Forest near Chinchilla.

== Conservation status ==
This eucalyptus is classified as "least concern" under the Queensland Government Nature Conservation Act 1992.

== See also ==
- List of Eucalyptus species
