= St Ambrose Church, Gilgandra =

St Ambrose Church
- Cooee Church; Church of St. Ambrose
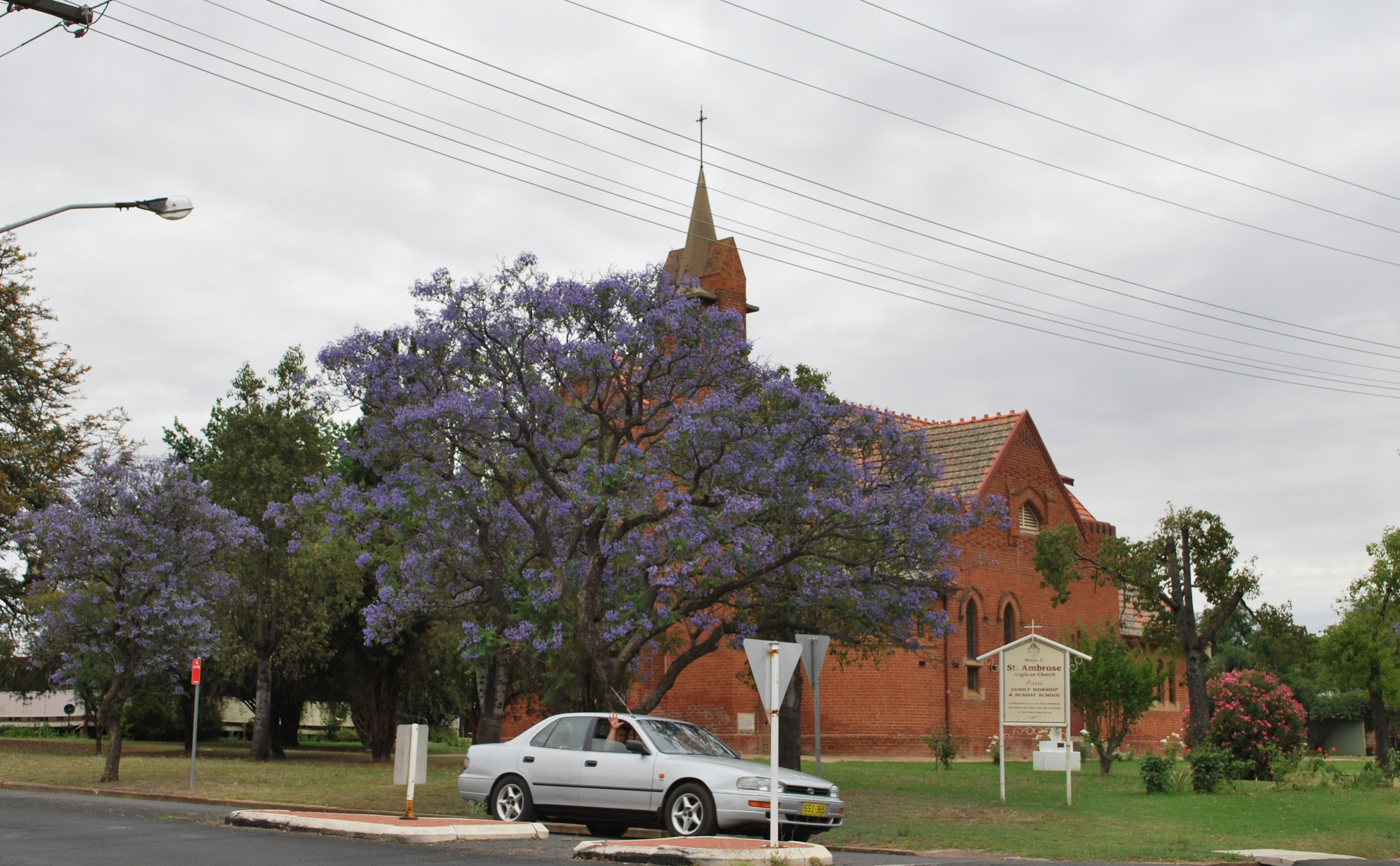
- St Ambrose Church, pictured in 2008

- Location in New South Wales
- 31°42′35″S 148°39′48″E
- Location: Myrtle Street, Gilgandra, Gilgandra Shire, New South Wales
- Country: Australia
- Denomination: Anglican
- Website: www.bathurstanglican.org.au/new-page-67

History
- Status: Church
- Founded: 22 November 1920
- Founder: Sir Walter Edward Davidson
- Dedication: Saint Ambrose
- Consecrated: 26 July 1922 by Bishop George Long

Architecture
- Functional status: Active
- Architect: Louis R. Williams
- Architectural type: Church
- Style: Federation Arts and Crafts
- Years built: 1921–1922

Administration
- Diocese: Bathurst
- Parish: Gilgandra

Clergy
- Rector: Rev. Canon Grahame Yager

New South Wales Heritage Register
- Official name: St. Ambrose Church; Cooee Church; Church of St. Ambrose; St Ambrose Church
- Type: State heritage (built)
- Designated: 28 January 2011
- Reference no.: 1853
- Type: Church
- Category: Religion
- Builders: J. D. Ryan

St Ambrose Church is a heritage-listed Anglican church at Myrtle Street, Gilgandra, Gilgandra Shire, New South Wales, Australia. It was designed by Louis R. Williams of North and Williams and built from 1921 to 1922 by J. D. Ryan. It is also known as Cooee Church and Church of St. Ambrose. The property is owned by the Anglican Property Trust Diocese of Bathurst. It was added to the New South Wales State Heritage Register on 28 January 2011.

The Church is currently closed due major structural cracking and instability.

== History ==
The foundation stone of St. Ambrose Church was laid by Governor of New South Wales, Sir Walter Edward Davidson, on 22 November 1920 with the words, "In the faith of Jesus Christ; in grateful memory of those who have served in the Great War, we place this foundation stone of a church to be built as a thank-offering for victory and peace." Governor Davidson in his speech alludes to the unique association the Church has with World War I. St. Ambrose owes its existence, in a part, to a peace thanks-giving gift of £1,200, made by parishioners of St. Ambrose Church, Bournemouth, England to the town of Gilgandra, which they judged to be "the town in the British dominions with the greatest record of achievements in the war".

After the close of World War I, parishioners of St. Ambrose Church in Bournemouth, grateful for the assistance England had received from the dominions in defending the British Empire, decided make a peace thanks-giving gift of £1,200 to the town in the Empire with a good church and wartime service record. The money was to be used to construct an Anglican church. Competition for the gift was well underway by the time that Bishop of Bathurst, George Long heard about the competition while in London. Bishop Long contacted the Bournemouth church authorities and persuaded them not to give their decision until Gilgandra's church and war-service record was placed before them.

Gilgandra had an impressive war-service record. The Gilgandra district had sent 250 volunteers, out of a district population of 4,500 to help with the war effort. Gilgandra was also famous for its association with Australia's first and largest recruiting snowball march, the Coo-ee March. The Coo-ee March had been organised by Gilgandra resident William (Bill) Hitchen, working in conjunction with Alex Miller, secretary of the local recruiting association, in response to calls for more volunteers to join the war effort.

By 1915 the flow of volunteers signing up to defend the Empire had slowed to a trickle as the setbacks at Gallipoli and the reality of 20th-century warfare began to hit home to the Australian population. The Coo-ee March, which was to start in Gilgandra and ended in Sydney, was intended as a recruitment drive. New recruits were to be called for, using famous bush call Coo-ee, at each town on route. On 10 October 1915, 30 Gilgandra men set off on the 320-mile (510 km) march to the cheers of a 3,000 strong crowd. The 30 men were joined by another 5 Gilgandra men on route.

The March took a month to reach Sydney and by the time the marchers arrived at their destination the numbers of recruits had swelled to 263. The Coo-ees received a tremendous welcome from Sydney-siders with thousands lining their route from Ashfield to The Domain. The success of the Coo-ee March inspired other "snowball" recruiting marches such as: The Waratahs who marched from Nowra to Sydney (120 recruits); the Kangaroos who marched from Wagga to Sydney (230 recruits); the Wallabies who marched from Narrabri to Newcastle (173 recruits); and the Kookaburras who marched from Toorweenah to Bathurst (93 recruits). The Kookaburra March, which took place in January 1916 was also organised by Bill Hitchen (along with his brother Richard).

The other condition set by Bournemouth church authorities, was that the recipient town had to have a good church record. Gilgandra, which was proclaimed a town in 1888, had a well established association with Anglican Church. Churches were active in Gilgandra in the 1880s and by 1897 the Protestant denominations had built a Union Church. Regular Anglican services were held in the town by the turn of the 20th century. Gilgandra's first Anglican church, The Church of the Resurrection, had been built in c. 1903 by public subscription and with the help of English parishes, which pledged to help support the work of the Brotherhood of the Good Shepherd (also known as the Bush Brothers). Priests from the Brotherhood of the Good Shepherd had served the Gilgandra district from 1902. The brotherhood regularly travelled to outlying villages and homesteads to administer the Anglican faith. In 1911 brothers based in Gilgandra served 4,000 Anglicans in a vast area between Moriguy to Gulargambone, Collie to Mendooran, and from Coboco Creek to the Warrumbungle Mountains.

Gilgandra was selected by the Bournemouth church authorities as the recipient of the peace and thanks-giving gift in December 1919. At the time the Bournemouth donation was received, Gilgandra's Anglican congregation was in the process of raising money for a new church, as the Church of Resurrection had fallen into disrepair. The Bournemouth gift together with the money already raised was not sufficient for the building that Gilgandra church authorities had in mind, and therefore before building of the new church could commence, a loan of A£2,000 had to be secured.

Plans for the new Church, which is styled after its English namesake, were drawn up in 1920 by architect Louis Reginald Williams from the Melbourne firm North and Williams. North and Williams specialised in church work. Louis Williams is regarded as one of Australia's foremost ecclesiastical architects. Demolition of the old church began in July 1921 and by September 1921 the builder, J. D. Ryan, had laid the foundations of the new Church.

St. Ambrose Church was consecrated by Bishop Long on 26 July 1922. It was dedicated after St. Ambrose, Bournemouth in recognition of the gift of A£1,200 and in memory of those who served in the Great War. The Church, which cost around A£5,200 to build, was left unfinished with two bays, a baptistery and porches to either side omitted from the western elevation, due to a shortage of funds. For the next sixty years St. Ambrose Church was under the supervision of the Bush Brothers. The last Bush Brother, Rev. John Green, left Gilgandra in 1963. Rev. Green was succeeded by Rev, Doug Peters, the first vicar to be appointed to the Parish.

Today, the St. Ambrose Church has become a focal point for commemorating the 1915 Coo-ee March. Every October during the Coo-ee Festival, a memorial service for the Coo-ees is held at the Church on the final day of the festival.

== Description ==
St. Ambrose Church is set in open park-like grounds on the corner of Myrtle and Wamboin Streets, near the southern entrance to the town of Gilgandra. The Federation Arts and Crafts Gothic styled Anglican church, was designed by Louis R. Williams (a key practitioner of the Inter War Gothic style of architecture) and exhibits a number of characteristics of Williams' style including:

- Numbers of small windows grounded dramatically under long concrete lintels;
- The use of flattened segmental arches;
- Imposing gabled roofs broken into irregular shapes at the extremities
- Avoidance of complete symmetry;
- Honesty of fabric, i.e. brick is always seen to be brick, concrete is always seen to be concrete (not represented as fake stone). Timber structural members are more solid than strictly necessary;
- The main elevation of the chancel (in the case of St. Ambrose, the south facade of the church) having windows placed at a height which allowed the congregation to focus on the rituals of worship, without the distraction of too much light in the sanctuary.

Exterior

From the exterior St. Ambrose Church is cruciform in shape. The exterior walls of the building comprise face brickwork with bands of patterned brickwork running cross the upper elevation of the south facade, bellcote and the facades of the transepts. The north and south elevations of the main body of the church, as well as the east and west elevations of transepts, are gabled. The roof cladding comprises glazed terra-cotta tiles.

The south elevation features thin diagonal buttresses that rise to enclose a blank arched recess containing a rose window. The rose window comprises a plain circular opening divided by a brickwork cross. Either side of the buttresses are median-height arched openings that give entry to spaces behind the canted interior walls of the chancel, where panelled doors open to admit summer breezes. Attached to the south-east corner of the south wall of the church, is a bellcote with sloped sides and a spire.

The north elevation of the Church is unfinished, only two of the proposed four brick bays were constructed. The additional bays (baptistery and porches to either side) were omitted due to a short fall in the building fund. Weatherboards were used (supposedly as temporary measure) to infill the area. Today the boards are covered by manufactured board stamped with a brick pattern. The cladding is punctuated by a centrally located door opening. Originally, the doorway was protected from the weather by timber porch with a lean-to-roof, but in 1975 the porch was replaced by a timber framed narthex clad in the same material as the north elevation. Above the narthex is a lancet window and directly above the window is a gable vent. A cantilevered hipped roof is attached to the northern gable end. The two side bays have median-height arched openings. The bay on the eastern half of the north elevation is punctuated by a door opening reached by a set of steps, while the opening in the west bay provides entry into an ambulatory aisle.

The eastern elevation is dominated by the east transept (the choir) and a semi-circular chapel. The east transept face is punctuated by: a door opening, above which are three narrow rectangular window openings; two lancet windows; and a small arched window (framed by "hanging" buttresses), that pierces the centre of the gable. The sweep of the gable roof is interrupted by short parapets on either side with mini-crenellations on top. The semi-circular chapel projects from the southern side of the east transept and dies into the side-wall of the chancel. Sunlight enters the chapel through the small rectangular shaped windows that run around the exterior wall of chapel just under the roof-line. The chapel has a conical shaped roof. The roof cladding comprises terra-cotta shingles.

The wide nave roof of the church comes low on the sides. On the east elevation, a single sweep of the roof takes in an arcade and ambulatory aisle. Light enters the eastern side of the nave through five lancet widows which pierce the east wall of the nave. On the west elevation the arcade is beyond the nave wall, creating a shade-pool. The western elevation of the Church is dominated by west transept (the vestry and organ loft). The west transept face has wing buttresses forming its outer edges and a broken gable with a half-hip projecting over a single long lancet window. Lower down the wall are two groups of narrow window openings, three each under a single concrete lintel.

Interior

From the exterior St. Ambrose church appears to be cruciform but this impression is contradicted by the assignment of the interior spaces. The low chancel arch (which rests on two massive piers) does not form part of a crossing but is in fact the entrance to the chancel and choir area.

The interior walls of the Church are bare-brick. The nave and chancel ceilings comprise timber boards and timber tie-beams support the roof. The lower half of the western nave wall is pierced by small, grouped windows which overlook an external ambulatory aisle enclosed by an arcade. An arcade on the eastern side of the nave opens into a low internal aisle.

The chancel is located in the south end of the Church with altar placed at the base of the south wall. The chancel is lit from above by clerestory windows in the east and west elevations. A large arch-headed opening - decorated with a wrought and cast iron rood screen - in the east chancel wall, provides a view into the choir area from the chancel. Access to the choir area is through a segmented arch-headed door opening. On the south side of the choir, is an arch-headed door opening that leads into the chapel, which comprises the transept plus the circular apse.

The west wall of the chancel is solid with the exception of an arch-headed door opening to the vestry, with a window opening, and an organ gallery opening corbelled out above. What appears to be the "west transept" from the exterior actually comprises two rooms on two levels. The vestry is located on the ground floor with the organ chamber above, although there is no pipe organ present.

The building and grounds were reported to be well maintained as at 15 July 2011, although structural issues relating to the inadequacy of the building's foundations continue to plague the building.

The building has a high degree of integrity.

== Heritage listing ==
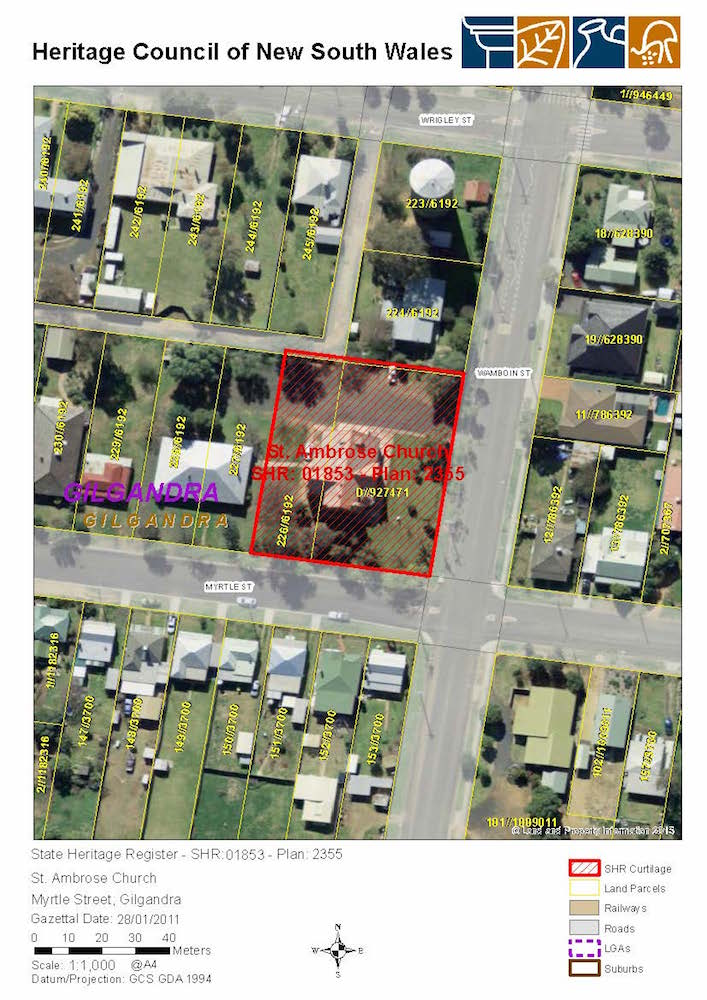
Heritage boundaries

St. Ambrose Church commemorates the town of Gilgandra's unique place in Australia's World War I history, as the place where Australia's first and largest "snow balling" recruitment march began. The Church was constructed using locally raised funds and a substantial peace and thanks-giving donation from the parishioners of St. Ambrose Church Bournemouth, England. The donation was awarded to Gilgandra (over other towns in the British dominions) due to the town's remarkable war service record which included the 1915 Coo-ee March. The substantial peace and thanks-giving donation given to Gilgandra for the construction of St. Ambrose Church, appears to be unique within NSW and Australia.

St. Ambrose Church was designed by prominent Melbourne architect Louis Reginald Williams (1890-1980). Williams is considered to be one of Australia's foremost ecclesiastical architects. St. Ambrose Church is a fine example of a relatively early Louis Williams church. The Church exhibits a number of characteristics of Williams' style. St. Ambrose Church is also a good representative example of the Inter-War Gothic style of architecture (c. 1915-c. 1940) of which Williams was a key practitioner.

St Ambrose Church was listed on the New South Wales State Heritage Register on 28 January 2011 having satisfied the following criteria.

The place is important in demonstrating the course, or pattern, of cultural or natural history in New South Wales.

St. Ambrose Church commemorates the town of Gilgandra's unique place in Australia's WW1 history, as the place where Australia's first and largest "snow balling" recruitment march began. The Church was constructed using locally raised funds and a substantial peace and thanks-giving donation from the parishioners of St. Ambrose Church Bournemouth, England. The donation was awarded to Gilgandra (over other towns in the British dominions) due to the town's remarkable war service record, which included the 1915 Coo-ee March. Today St. Ambrose Church is a focal point for commemoration of the Coo-ee March. The annual memorial service for the Coo-ees is held in the Church on the last day of the October Coo-ee Festival.

St. Ambrose Church is historically important at a local level, as the Anglican parish church of Gilgandra and the surrounding district since 1922. The site has hosted Anglican services since 1903.

The place has a strong or special association with a person, or group of persons, of importance of cultural or natural history of New South Wales's history.

St. Ambrose Church was designed by prominent Melbourne architect Louis Reginald Williams (1890-1980). Williams is considered to be one of Australia's foremost ecclesiastical architects and a key practitioner of the Inter War Gothic architectural style.

St. Ambrose Church is of local significance for its association with the work of the Brotherhood of the Good Shepherd (otherwise known as the Bush Brothers). The Bush Brothers supervised worship at the Church from its dedication in 1922 until the last Bush Brother left Gilgandra in 1963.

The place is important in demonstrating aesthetic characteristics and/or a high degree of creative or technical achievement in New South Wales.

St. Ambrose Church is fine example of a relatively early church designed by Louis Williams. The Church exhibits a number of characteristics of Williams' style:

- Numbers of small windows grouped dramatically under long concrete lintels;
- The use of flattened segmental arches;
- Imposing gabled roofs broken into irregular shapes at the extremities;
- Honesty of fabric, i.e. brick is always seen to be brick, concrete is always seen to be concrete (not represented as fake stone).Timber structural members are more solid than strictly necessary;
- Avoidance of complete symmetry; and
- The main elevation of the chancel (in the case of St. Ambrose, the south facade of the church) having windows placed at a height which allows the congregation to focus on the rituals of worship without the distraction of too much light in the sanctuary.

The place has strong or special association with a particular community or cultural group in New South Wales for social, cultural or spiritual reasons.

St. Ambrose Church is important to the Gilgandra community's sense of place. The history of the Church has become inextricably bound to the history of 1915 Coo-ee March, and as such the Church contributes to the Gilgandra community's sense of identity, as the place where Australia's first and largest "snow balling" recruitment march began. The Church is also important to the local community as memorial to all those who served in the Great War of 1914-1918.

St. Ambrose Church has a strong association with the Gilgandra district's local Anglicans. The Church has been a place of Anglican worship since 1922.

The place possesses uncommon, rare or endangered aspects of the cultural or natural history of New South Wales.

The substantial peace and thanks-giving donation given to Gilgandra for the construction of St. Ambrose Church appears to be unique within NSW and Australia.

The place is important in demonstrating the principal characteristics of a class of cultural or natural places/environments in New South Wales.

St. Ambrose Church with its: asymmetrical massing; face brickwork; steeply pitched roof; bellcote; rose/circular window; buttresses; crenellations; pointed arches; use of exposed timber roof trusses over large spans; traditional load-bearing masonry walls and reinforced concrete construction (concealed from view) demonstrates the principal characteristics of the Inter-War Gothic style of architecture (c. 1915-c. 1940).

== See also ==
- List of Anglican churches in New South Wales
