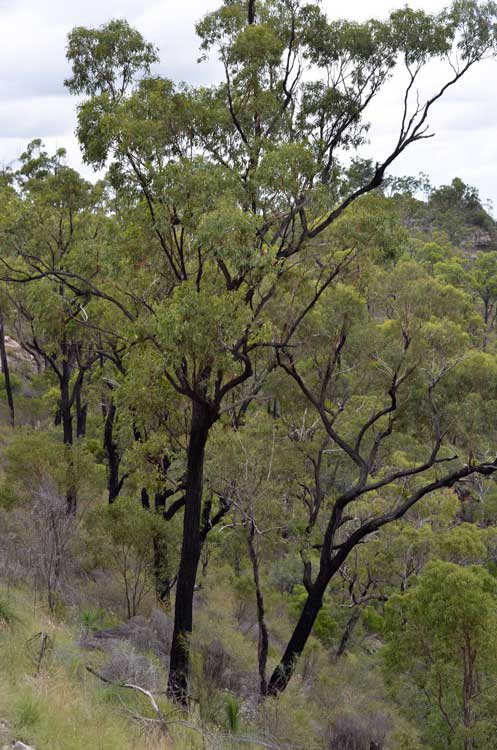
- Eucalyptus beaniana in Isla Gorge National Park

Conservation status
- Vulnerable (EPBC Act)

Scientific classification
- Kingdom: Plantae
- Clade: Embryophytes
- Clade: Tracheophytes
- Clade: Spermatophytes
- Clade: Angiosperms
- Clade: Eudicots
- Clade: Rosids
- Order: Myrtales
- Family: Myrtaceae
- Genus: Eucalyptus
- Species: E. beaniana

Binomial name
- Eucalyptus beaniana L.A.S.Johnson & K.D.Hill

= Eucalyptus beaniana =

Bean's ironbark

Species of eucalyptus

Eucalyptus beaniana , commonly known as the Bean's ironbark, is a small tree that is endemic to Queensland. It has rough, furrowed "ironbark" on the trunk and branches, dull green to bluish, lance-shaped to curved adult leaves, flower buds in groups of seven, white flowers and cup-shaped to conical fruit. It is only known from four locations in southern inland Queensland.

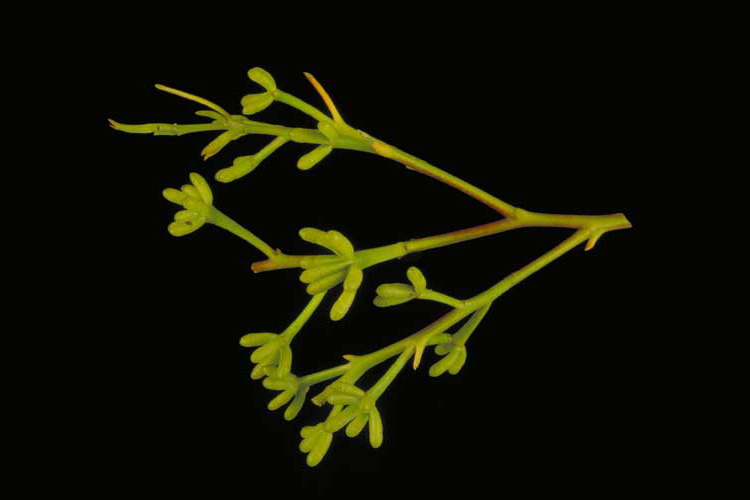
Flower buds

== Description ==
Eucalyptus beaniana is a tree that grows to a height of 10–15 mm (0.4–0.6 in) and forms a lignotuber. It has hard black "ironbark" on its trunk and larger branches. Branches thinner than about 5 mm (0.2 in) have smooth, brownish white bark. Young plants and coppice regrowth have leaves that are arranged alternately, linear, 55–90 mm (2–4 in) long and 4–6 mm (0.16–0.24 in) wide on a short petiole. Adult leaves are the same dull green to bluish colour on both sides, lance-shaped to curved, 70–130 mm (3–5 in) long and 9–23 mm (0.4–0.9 in) wide on a petiole 10–25 mm (0.4–1 in) long. The flower buds are arranged in group of seven, mostly on the ends of the branches. The groups are on a branched peduncle 5–11 mm (0.2–0.4 in) long, the individual flowers on a pedicel 3–5 mm (0.12–0.20 in) long. Mature buds are club-shaped to spindle-shaped or more or less cylindrical, 4–7 mm (0.16–0.28 in) long and 2–4 mm (0.079–0.16 in) wide. The operculum is about as long as, or slightly shorter than the floral cup and blunt conical to rounded. Flowering has been recorded in September and the flowers are white. The fruit is a woody, cup-shaped to conical capsule 4–6 mm (0.16–0.24 in) long, 3–6 mm (0.1–0.2 in) wide on a pedicel 2–7 mm (0.079–0.28 in) long with the valves level or slightly protruding.

Eucalyptus beaniana is closely related to E. taurina, but can be distinguished by the linear juvenile leaves and by larger amount of smooth bark on the branches.

== Taxonomy and naming ==
Eucalyptus beaniana was first formally described by Ken Hill and Lawrie Johnson in 1991 in the journal Telopea from samples collected near the Isla Gorge lookout carpark by Johnson and Anthony Russell Bean in 1984. The specific epithet (beaniana) honours Anthony Bean.

== Distribution and habitat ==
Bean's ironbark is found growing in shallow and sandy soils as part of woodland communities along with numerous other eucalypt species, on quartzose and sandstone ridges. It is known from only four locations in south-east Queensland, in the Isla Gorge National Park, near Taroom, Cracow and Mundubbera.

== Conservation ==
Eucalyptus beaniana is listed as "vulnerable" under the Australian Government Environment Protection and Biodiversity Conservation Act 1999 and under the Queensland Government Nature Conservation Act 1992.

== See also ==
- List of Eucalyptus species
