= Snowball marches =

Australian First World War recruitment drives

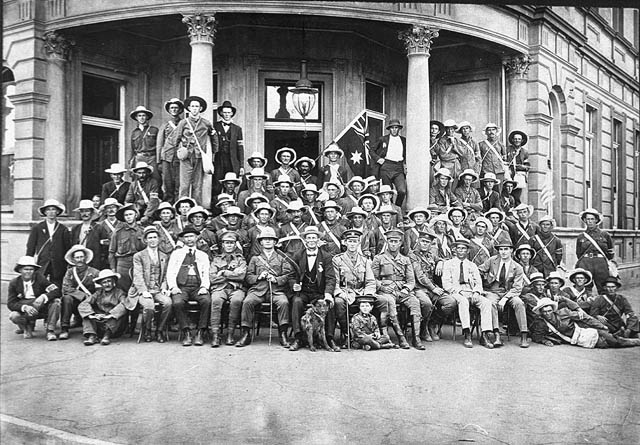
The Boomerangs at Forbes

During World War I, recruitment marches or snowball marches to state capital cities were a feature of volunteer recruiting drives for the Australian Imperial Force in rural Australia. Between October 1915 and February 1916, nine marches were held starting from various points; the most notable was the first march from Gilgandra, New South Wales, known as the Cooee march. The March of the Dungarees took place in south-eastern Queensland in November 1915. In 1918, in an effort to promote recruitment, another march was staged, but this was less spontaneous and the marchers in fact travelled by train.

The marches were called "snowball marches" in the hope that like a snowball rolling down a hill will pick up more snow, gaining more mass and surface area, and picking up even more snow as it rolls along, the marchers would also collect more marchers as they progressed to the recruiting depot.

== Background ==
The Australian Imperial Force was formed promptly on the declaration of World War I as a volunteer force; many men signed up immediately. From mid-June 1915 there was a substantial increase in recruitment, as state-based Parliamentary recruiting committees were formed and became active in towns, boroughs and shires. In June 1915 the Minister for Defence George Pearce set recruitment goals at 5,300 men per month in order to maintain the forces fighting at Gallipoli.

This target was exceeded in Victoria when 21,698 men enlisted in that month, the largest number from any state during the war. The campaign in New South Wales by contrast was disappointing for state leaders — especially so in light of interstate rivalry between the two neighbours. It was suggested by the Premier of New South Wales, William Holman, that one of the reasons New South Wales was not meeting the targets was because the military authorities were not ready to accept the men at the time they offered to enlist and told them to come back later.

In response to these embarrassing recruitment shortfalls, some New South Wales residents launched a series of snowball recruiting marches, which were intended to encourage men to enlist through the marchers' example. The first march was a locally based initiative led by the captain of the local Rifle Club in October 1915; eight other marches were known to have taken place over the next four months. Military authorities were initially ambivalent about the marches; they were not certain whether or not the men should march with rifles, when their pay would start, and who would clothe or feed them. Along the route however, local communities fed and housed the men, and the marches gained tremendous publicity. About 1,500 men marched in total, and they are credited by some sources with persuading anywhere from two to three times that number to enlist as a result.

== Marches in 1915 and 1916 ==
=== Cooee March ===
Twenty six men left Gilgandra on 10 October 1915 on the 'Cooee March', led by the captain of the local rifle club, William Thomas Hitchen. At each town on the route the marchers shouted "cooee" to attract recruits and held recruitment meetings. By the time they reached Sydney just over one month later on 12 November, the numbers had swelled to 263 recruits, marching a total of 320 miles (510 km) and being welcomed by large crowds along the way.

During the march, the Cooees were issued about 50 dungarees in Dubbo, Army greatcoats in Orange and some additional dungarees in Lithgow.

After the close of World War I, parishioners of St Ambrose Church in Bournemouth, England, grateful for the assistance England had received from the dominions in defending the British Empire, decided make a peace thanks-giving gift of £1,200 to the town in the Empire with a good church and wartime service record. The money was to be used to construct an Anglican church. Gilgandra was selected by the Bournemouth church authorities as the recipient of the peace and thanks-giving gift in December 1919 and the construction of St Ambrose Church in Gilgandra commenced in 1920.

=== The March of the Dungarees ===
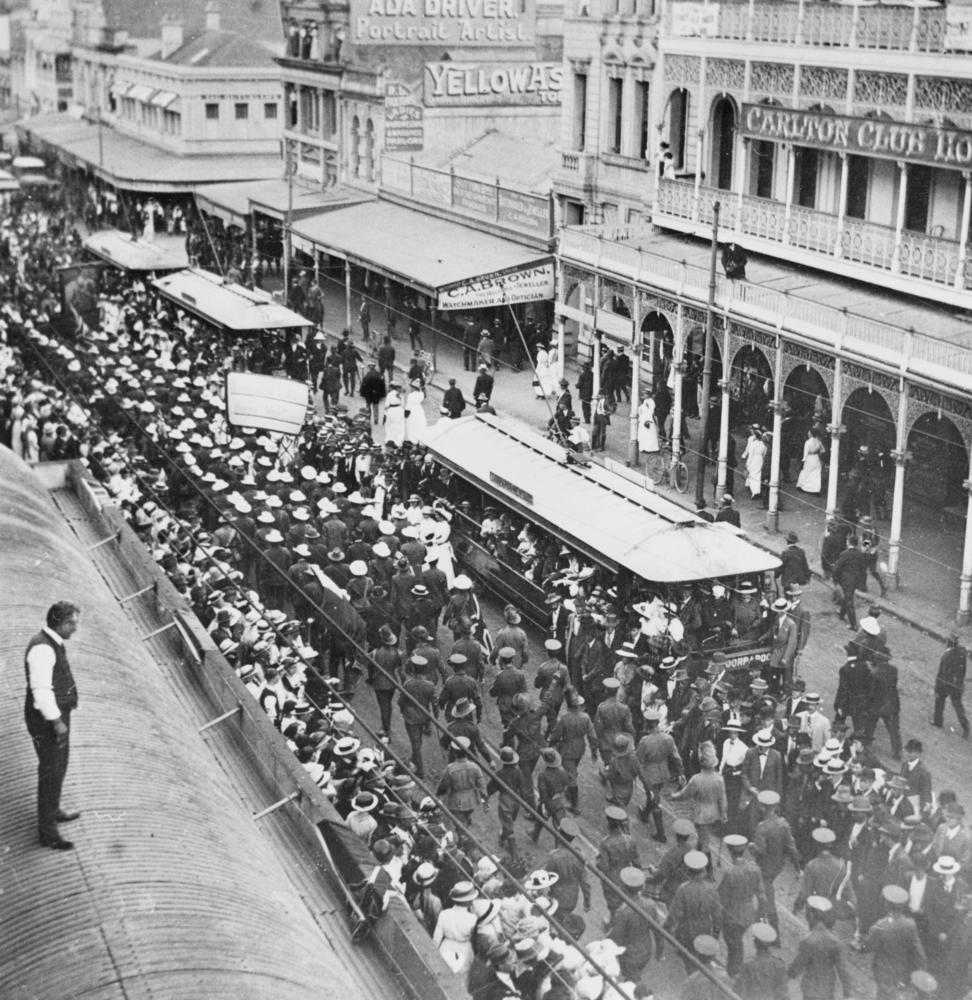
The March of the Dungarees along Queen Street, Brisbane, 1915

The March of the Dungarees in south-east Queensland started with 28 men leaving Warwick on 16 November 1915. Their march followed the Southern railway line, making its way through Allora, Clifton, Greenmount, Cambooya, Toowoomba, Helidon, Gatton, Laidley, Rosewood, Ipswich and Oxley. The 270 kilometre march ended in Brisbane with 125 recruits.

=== Waratahs ===
Men marched from the South Coast: Nowra, Bomaderry, Meroo, Berry, Gerringong, Kiama, Jamberoo, Albion Park, Dapto, Unanderra, Port Kembla, Wollongong, Balgownie, Corrimal, Woonona, Bulli, Thirroul, Coledale, Scarborough, Stanwell Park, Helensburgh, Heathcote, Sutherland, Hurstville, Kogarah, Rockdale, arriving at The Domain. The contingent included men from Jervis Bay and Kangaroo Valley even though these towns were not on the route. The Waratahs entered camp at Liverpool on 17 December 1915.

=== Kangaroo March ===
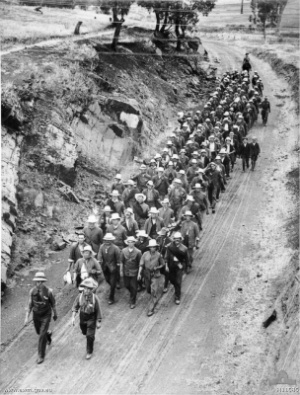
Kangaroo March near Wallendbeen, New South Wales

Eighty-eight potential soldiers left Wagga Wagga on 1 December 1915. They marched via Harefield, Junee, Illabo, Bethungra, Cootamundra and Wallendbeen. At Wallendbeen on 9 December, the Governor-General addressed the marchers. After Wallendbeen, they marched via Nubba to Murrumburrah and the next day they were at Harden. They then marched through Galong, Binalong and Bowning to Yass. From Wagga Wagga to Yass was a total of 132 miles, the march travelled at an average of 8.8 miles per day. As with other marches, the men were fed and feted by the local population; at Murrumburrah, for instance, donations included 114 puddings and 9 sheep to be baked gratis by the local bakers, 200 loaves of bread, 850 potatoes and 30 dozen eggs. They marched to Campbelltown via Goulburn. The Kangaroo recruits travelled from Campbelltown into Sydney by train arriving on 7 January 1916 with somewhere between 210 and 230 recruits. It had been decided that this recruitment drive would finish at Campbelltown so that a country contingent could be created.

There were reports of rowdy and drunken behaviour along the route by the marchers. The best known recruit from this march was John Ryan, who was awarded the Victoria Cross. The march finished at Campbelltown with over 220 recruits.

=== The Wallabies ===
'Maitlands Own' Battalion, the 34th, was formed from a core of men who had commenced a recruitment march at Narrabri on 8 December 1915 and finished in Newcastle on 8 January 1916. Forty-three men began the march and 281 miles later there were 265 new recruits.

A re-enactment of the march was held on the 75th anniversary in 1990/1991.

=== Men from Snowy River ===
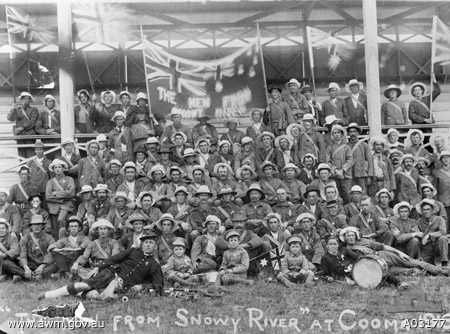
'Men from Snowy River' at Cooma

Following the successes of the 'Cooee' march in December 1915, 12 men set out from Delegate on 6 January 1916 to march the 220 miles to the nearest AIF Training Depot in Goulburn (currently the site of Goulburn High School). Marching under the 'Men from Snowy River' banner (now housed in the Western Front gallery at the Australian War Memorial), the recruitment march passed through the major regional centres of the Monaro, with civil receptions at Bombala, Cooma, Queanbeyan, Bungendore and Goulburn.

Although volunteers joined the 'Snowies' as they passed through smaller towns and villages, massive civil receptions at the larger centres celebratised the 'Snowy' recruits, which was intended to entice further 'eligibles' at the meetings to do likewise. Such was the case with recruit Timothy McMahon, who despite volunteering to march with the Men from Snowy River at Michelago, was employed by recruiting staff to dramatically 'volunteer' at several of these receptions in order to appeal to the patriotism of the crowd, and lure other volunteers into enlisting.

The Men from Snowy River recruitment march arrived in Goulburn on 28 January 1916 144 men strong. Despite the massive media attention the recruitment march received in the local press, the result of 144 recruits was disappointing to recruiting staff who had envisaged at least 200 men.

One recruit who did join the march was Ernest Albert Corey, a blacksmith from Nimmitabel. Corey later served with the 55th Battalion as a stretcher bearer, and is recognised as the only soldier in the British Empire to be awarded the Military Medal four times.

The majority of recruits who enlisted during the march later formed the 4th reinforcements of the 55th Battalion, AIF, all of which saw service on the Western front. Of the 144 men who enlisted in the march, 39 were later to be killed in action and 75 became casualties.

The Men from Snowy River recruitment march was revived during World War II when men retraced the original path of the 'Snowies', albeit diverting to Canberra. Both recruitment marches were commemorated by a reenactment of the march and a civil reception at the hall at Delegate in January 2006, on the 90th anniversary of the original Men from Snowy River march.

=== The Kookaburras ===
Twenty three men set out in January 1916 from Tooraweenah on a march to Bathurst to recruit men for service in World War I. Men were recruited from Coolah, Mendooran and Dunedoo, Binnaway, Merrygoen and Tucklan. En route, the Kookaburras are remembered for sleeping on the floor of the Capertee school. There is a veteran's plaque on the Tooraweenah village common.

=== North Coast Boomerangs ===
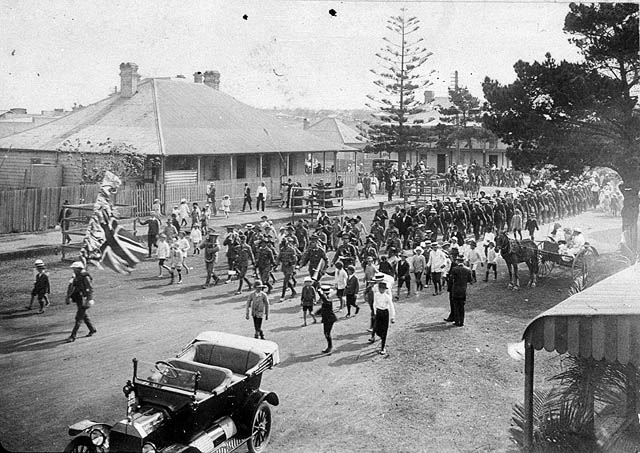
Arrival of "North Coasters" recruiting march in Port Macquarie

Twenty seven men left Grafton on 18 January 1916 and arrived at Maitland with 240 recruits. The march was accompanied by Bill Hitchen who had organised the original Snowball march of the Cooees.

=== Cane Beetles March ===
The Cane Beetles March was a snowball march in April 1916 in North Queensland, Australia, to recruit men into the Australian Imperial Force during World War I at a time when enthusiasm to enlist had waned after the loss of life in the Gallipoli campaign. The march began at Mooliba near Babinda with 4 men and ended in Cairns 60 kilometres later with 29 recruits.

=== Central West Boomerangs ===
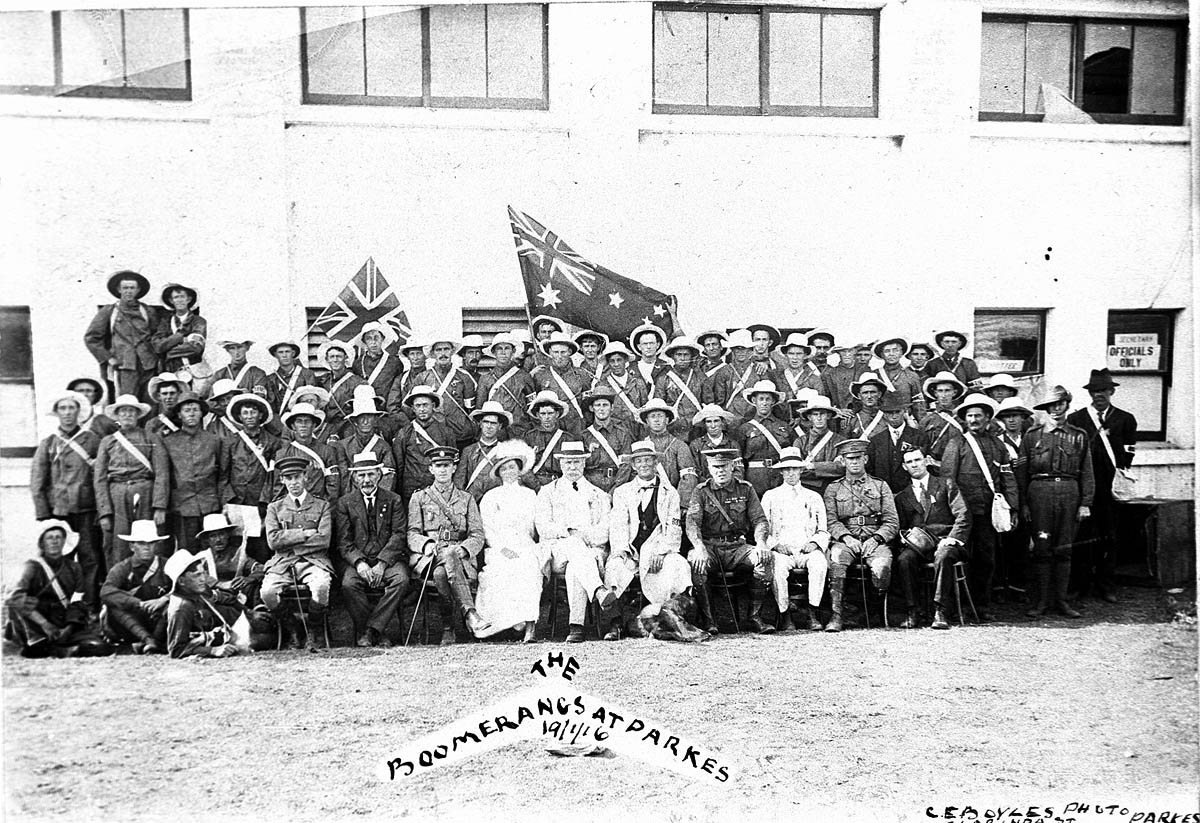
The Boomerangs at the Parkes showground on 19 January 1916, photographed with the Mayor and Mayoress

Seventy-one men left Parkes by train on 19 January 1916. They marched from Daroobalgie to Donaghey's Hill, and then on to Forbes, Yamma Station, Eugowra, Gooloogong, Canowindra, Billimari, Cowra, Woodstock, Lyndhurst, Carcoar, Blayney, Newbridge (to Georges Plains by train) and Perthville. They arrived in Bathurst with 202 recruits on 5 February 1916 at the same time as the Kookaburras from Tooraweenah and were given a combined reception. Each marcher was presented with a medallion in the shape of a boomerang, engraved with their name and town and the words "Come Back".

On the Light Horse memorial at Cowra, a plaque commemorates the re-enactment of the 1916 Boomerang march held in February 1999.

== Other possible marches ==
=== Casterton to Melbourne ===
A "snowball" march of recruits from Casterton, Victoria in the Western District to Melbourne, a distance of about 245 miles, was planned in 1916. It is not certain if this proceeded.

== 1918 marches ==
=== Southern March to Freedom ===
A 1918 recruitment march from Albury via Yass to Sydney. The march stopped at 12 towns but the 'marchers' travelled by train.

=== March to Freedom – Brisbane November 1918 ===
There was a 'march to freedom' recruiting march in Brisbane in November 1918.

=== Butler's 500 ‘Snowball March’ ===
The 1918 march, from Edithburgh, South Australia to Adelaide, raised 170 men just before the war's end. Colonel Charles Butler, who'd fought on the Western Front, volunteered to raise 500 fighting men, but despite an enthusiastic response only 170 men enlisted.
