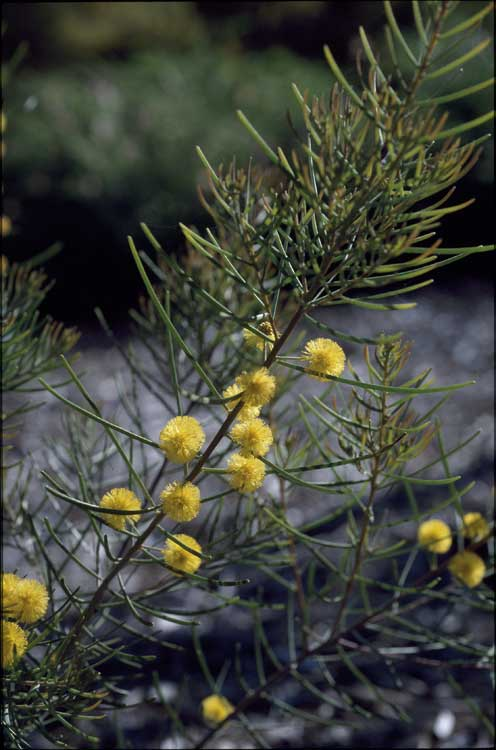
- In Mount Annan Botanic Garden

Conservation status
- Vulnerable (NCA)

Scientific classification
- Kingdom: Plantae
- Clade: Embryophytes
- Clade: Tracheophytes
- Clade: Spermatophytes
- Clade: Angiosperms
- Clade: Eudicots
- Clade: Rosids
- Order: Fabales
- Family: Fabaceae
- Subfamily: Caesalpinioideae
- Clade: Mimosoid clade
- Genus: Acacia
- Species: A. islana

Binomial name
- Acacia islana Pedley
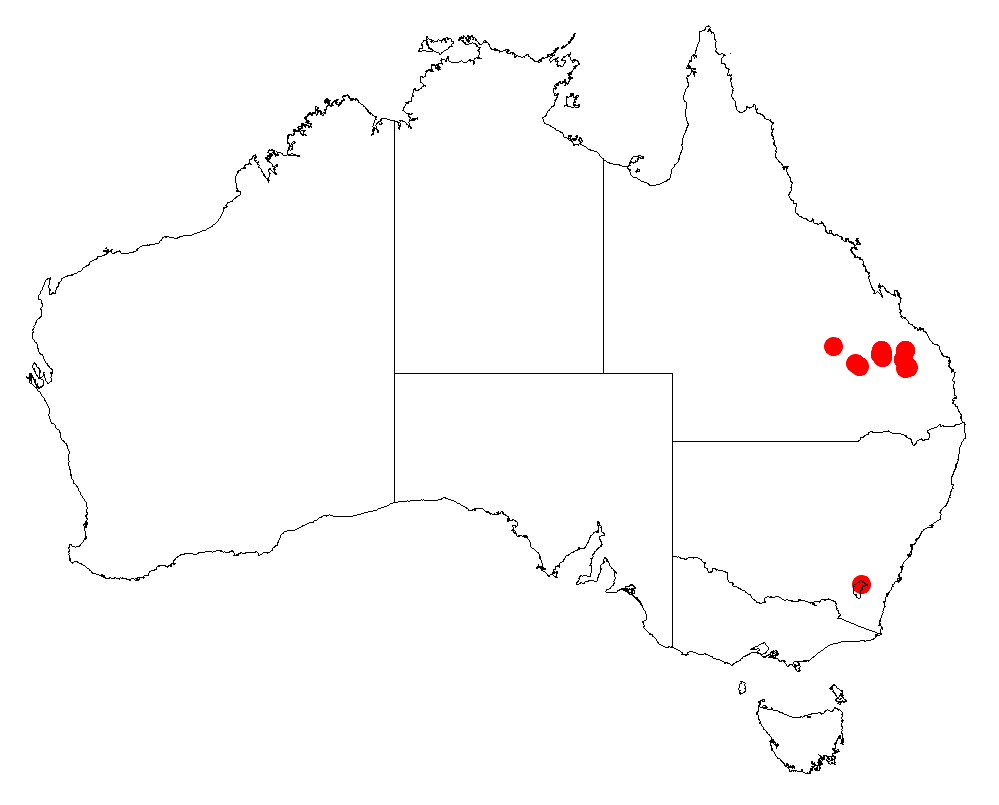
- Occurrence data from AVH

Synonyms
- Racosperma islanum (Pedley) Pedley

= Acacia islana =

Species of legume

Acacia islana is a species of flowering plant in the family Fabaceae and is endemic to Isla Gorge in Queensland, Australia. It is a spindly, open shrub with terete to subterete phyllodes, spherical heads of light golden yellow flowers and linear, firmly leathery pods.

== Description ==
Acacia islana is a spindly, open, glabrous shrub that typically grows to a height of 2–4 m (6 ft 7 in – 13 ft 1 in) and has ribbed, resinous branchlets. Its phyllodes are scattered, slender, some scattered in twos or threes, 1–20 mm (0.039–0.787 in) long and 0.3–0.5 mm (0.012–0.020 in) wide, abruptly constricted to a pulvinus about 0.2 mm (0.0079 in) long. The flowers are arranged in a spherical head in axils on a peduncle 7–13 mm (0.28–0.51 in) long, the heads with twenty to thirty light golden yellow flowers. Flowering occurs in August and September, and the pods are firmly leathery, up to 60 mm (2.4 in) long and 3–4 mm (0.12–0.16 in) wide. The seeds are oblong, 4.0–4.5 mm (0.16–0.18 in) long with an oblique aril.

== Taxonomy ==
Acacia islana was first formally described in 1980 by Leslie Pedley in the journal Austrobaileya from specimens collected in Isla Gorge in 1973.

== Distribution and habitat ==
This species of wattle is mainly restricted to Isla Gorge in central Queensland where it grows on sandstone in shallow soils in woodland, sometimes with Acacia hockingsii. It has also been recorded growing on basaltic soil in Carnarvon Gorge and in granitic soils in Expedition National Park and Precipice National Park where it is common.

== Conservation status ==
Acacia islana is listed as "vulnerable" under the Queensland Nature Conservation Act 1992.

== See also ==
- List of Acacia species
