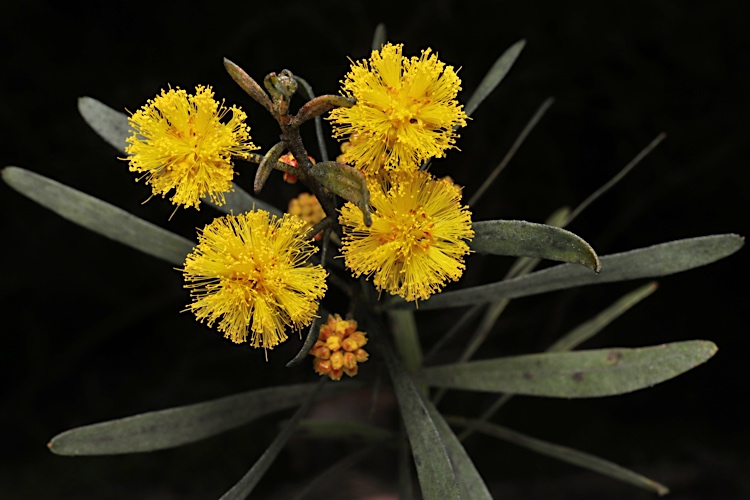
- In the Australian National Botanic Gardens

Scientific classification
- Kingdom: Plantae
- Clade: Embryophytes
- Clade: Tracheophytes
- Clade: Spermatophytes
- Clade: Angiosperms
- Clade: Eudicots
- Clade: Rosids
- Order: Fabales
- Family: Fabaceae
- Subfamily: Caesalpinioideae
- Clade: Mimosoid clade
- Genus: Acacia
- Species: A. ixodes

Binomial name
- Acacia ixodes Leslie Pedley
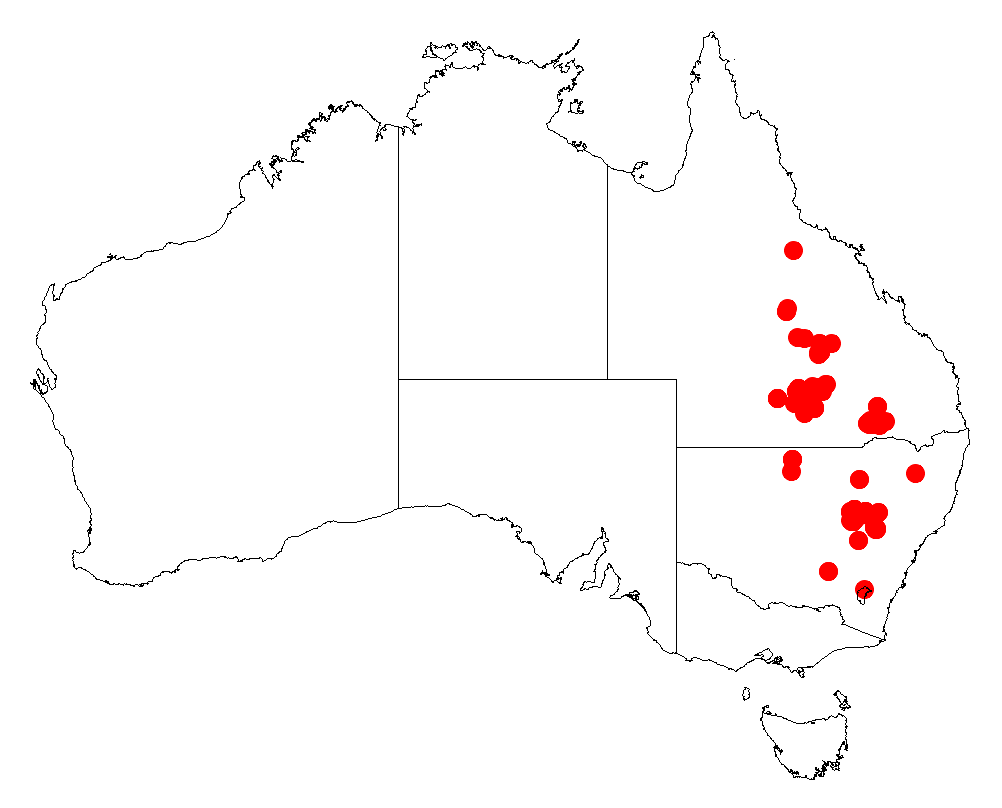
- Occurrence data from AVH

Synonyms
- Acacia gnidium var. latifolia Maiden & Betche; Racosperma ixodes (Pedley) Pedley

= Acacia ixodes =

Motherumbung

Species of legume

Acacia ixodes, commonly known as motherumbung, is a species of flowering plant in the family Fabaceae and is endemic to eastern Australia. It is a glabrous, bushy shrub or small tree with narrowly oblong to lance-shaped phyllodes with the narrower end towards the base, spherical heads of bright golden yellow flowers and firmly leathery, narrowly oblong to linear pods rounded over the seeds.

== Description ==
Acacia ixodes is a glabrous, slightly resinous, bushy shrub or small tree that typically grows to a height of 5–8 m (16–26 ft) and has slender branchlets. Its phyllodes are usually narrowly oblong to lance-shaped or narrowly lance-shaped with the narrower end towards the base, mostly straight, 20–50 mm (0.79–1.97 in) long and usually 3–6 mm (0.12–0.24 in) wide with a thickened point on the tip. The midrib is not prominent and there is a minute gland 1–3 mm (0.039–0.118 in) above the pulvinus and another at the tip. The flowers are arranged in a spherical head in axils on a peduncle 5–12 mm (0.20–0.47 in) long, each head with 20 to 30 showy, bright golden yellow flowers. Flowering occurs from August to November, and the pods are narrowly oblong to linear, up to 60 mm (2.4 in) long and usually 5–8 mm (0.20–0.31 in) wide, firmly leathery and rounded over the seeds. The seeds are oblong to elliptic or egg-shaped, 3–4 mm (0.12–0.16 in) long with an oblique aril.

== Taxonomy ==
This species was first formally described in 1905 by Joseph Maiden and Ernst Betche, who gave it the name Acacia gnidium var. latifolia in Proceedings of the Linnean Society of New South Wales from specimens collected near Gilgandra by Richard Hind Cambage. In 1980, Leslie Pedley raised the variety to species status as A. ixodes in the journal Austrobaileya. The specific epithet (ixodes) is a reference to the sticky nature of new shoots and young phyllodes.

== Distribution and habitat ==
This species of wattle grows on sandy soils, often with Eucalyptus melanophloia and Callitris columellaris, from west of Charleville to north of Bungunya in southern inland Queensland and from Dubbo to Gilgandra and near Mendooran in central New South Wales, with older records from near Bourke.

== Conservation status ==
Acacia ixodes is listed as 'least concern' under the Queensland Government Nature Conservation Act 1992.

== See also ==
- List of Acacia species
