= Georges Plains =

Georges Plains New South Wales
- Coordinates: 33°31′00″S 149°31′00″E
- Population: 248 (2016 census)
- Postcode(s): 2795
- Location: 15 km (9 mi) SW of Bathurst
- LGA(s): Bathurst Region
- State electorate(s): Bathurst
- Federal division(s): Calare

Georges Plains is a locality in the Bathurst Region of New South Wales, Australia. It had a population of 248 people as of the 2016 census.

Georges Plains is located approximately 12 km south of Bathurst, via Perthville. Within the land of the Wiradjuri people the village of Georges Plains, named by European settlers in honour of King George III, was one of at least three Government stock stations established when the western side of the Macquarie was reserved for Government use.

European settlement in this area originally consisted of large pastoral grants and the village of Georges Plains was once a fully functioning township servicing the needs of the rural area. It is still possible to see the remnants of the shop and post office in the main street, the disused railway station still stands, and the old hotel is now a private residence.

Georges Plains Public School opened in April 1889 and closed in December 1973. It was half-time with Wimbledon from August 1894 to August 1899. The one-room school building burned down in 1973, and the school master's house is now a private home.

The long-closed gothic stone St John's Anglican Church, designed by Edward Gell and funded by local pastoralist Joseph Smith, dates from 1867. The Georges Plains Cemetery was originally the Anglican church cemetery; it was subdivided from the church in 1996 and is now maintained by the local council. The Georges Plains Hotel closed in 1999 and had its license transferred to a nightclub in Darling Harbour, Sydney.

It shares a Rural Fire Brigade station with nearby Perthville.

Television personality Grant Denyer lives on a property overlooking the village.

== Heritage listings ==
Georges Plains has a number of heritage-listed sites, including:

- Main Western railway: Georges Plains railway station
