= John Farragher =

Australian rugby league player (1957–2025)

Personal information
- Full name: John Wayne Farragher
- Born: 1 April 1957 Gilgandra, New South Wales, Australia
- Died: 1 November 2025 (aged 68) Penrith, New South Wales, Australia

Playing information
- Position: Prop
Club
Years	Team	Pld	T	G	FG	P
1978	Penrith Panthers	7	0	0	0	0

John Wayne Farragher OAM (1 April 1957 – 1 November 2025) was an Australian professional rugby league footballer who played in the 1970s. He played for the Penrith Panthers as a prop.

== Playing career ==
A Gilgandra junior, Farragher was graded by the Penrith Panthers in the 1977 season. Penrith coach Barry Harris gave Farragher his first grade debut in the 1978 season. He made his first grade debut in his side's 9−8 loss to the South Sydney Rabbitohs at Redfern Oval in round 4 of the 1978 season.

On 28 May 1978, in just his seventh appearance in the top grade, against the Newtown Jets at Henson Park in round 10 of the 1978 season, a collapsed scrum during the first half left him seriously injured. It was later revealed that he had dislocated his neck and damaged his spinal cord. Whilst surgery was able to correct the neck dislocation, he became a quadriplegic.

== Post playing ==
In the aftermath of his injuries, a trust fund was set up to provide Farragher with the financial support needed for the rest of his life. After extensive rehabilitation he returned to work at Panthers Leagues Club in 1982, taking on a role in public relations to greet and assist the club's members and guests. He continued to hold the role, with his charm, warmth and passion for the Panthers making him a popular and recognizable character among the club's patrons. In 2016, he was awarded the Medal of the Order of Australia for his services to rugby league.

Farragher died on 1 November 2025 following a cardiac arrest at Nepean Hospital at the age of 68.
