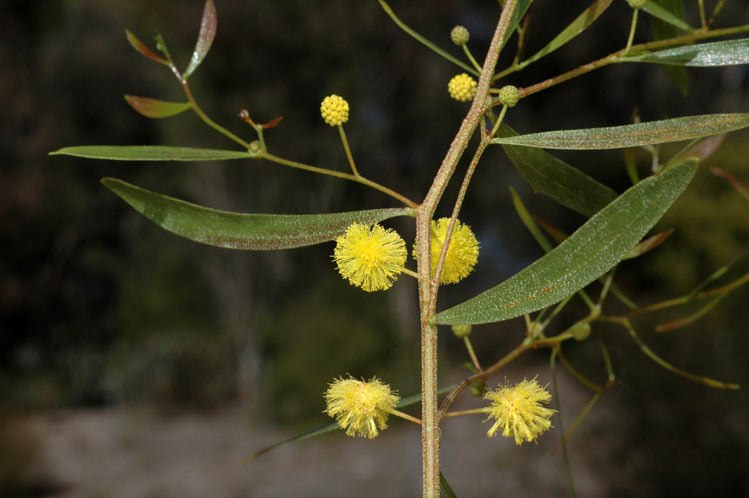
- In the Australian National Botanic Gardens

Scientific classification
- Kingdom: Plantae
- Clade: Tracheophytes
- Clade: Angiosperms
- Clade: Eudicots
- Clade: Rosids
- Order: Fabales
- Family: Fabaceae
- Subfamily: Caesalpinioideae
- Clade: Mimosoid clade
- Genus: Acacia
- Species: A. gnidium

Binomial name
- Acacia gnidium Benth.
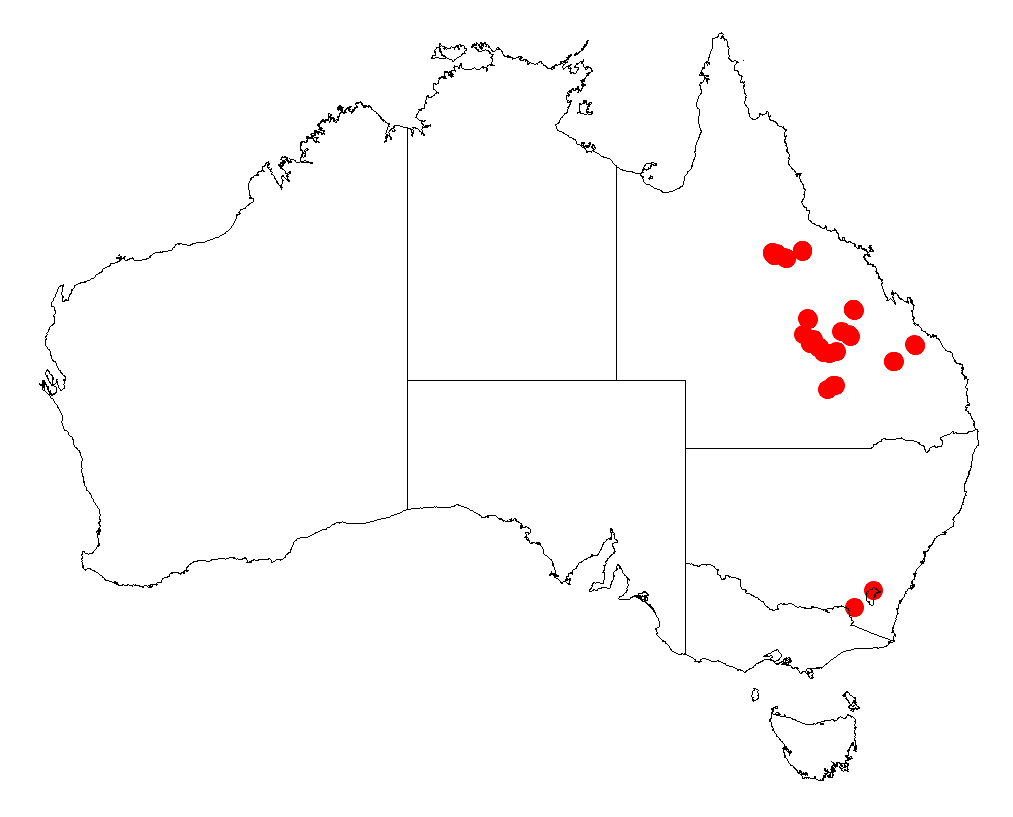
- Occurrence data from AVH

Synonyms
- Acacia gnidium Benth. var. gnidium; Racosperma gnidium (Benth.) Pedley

= Acacia gnidium =

Species of legume

Acacia gnidium is a species of flowering plant in the family Fabaceae and is endemic to Queensland, Australia. It is a dense, spreading glabrous shrub with narrowly linear phyllodes, spherical heads of golden yellow flowers and narrowly oblong, papery pods

== Description ==
Acacia gnidium is a dense, spreading, glabrous and fragrant shrub that typically grows to a height of up to 4 m (13 ft). The phyllodes are ascending to erect, narrowly linear, straight to slightly curved, 30–50 mm (1.2–2.0 in) long and 1–2 mm (0.039–0.079 in) wide with a short point near the end. The flowers are borne in a spherical head in axils, on a peduncle 5–12 mm (0.20–0.47 in) long, each head with 15 to 25 golden yellow flowers. The pods are papery and narrowly oblong, up to 60 mm (2.4 in) long, 5–6 mm (0.20–0.24 in) wide, and slightly rounded over the seeds and barely constricted between them.

== Taxonomy ==
Acacia gnidium was first formally described in 1864 by George Bentham in his Flora Australiensis from specimens collected "under sandstone hills near Mount Pluto" by Mitchell.

== Distribution and habitat ==
This species of wattle grows in rugged sandstone country and is found in scattered locations in Central Queensland from around Kroombit Tops National Park, Mount Pluto and Alpha station to west of Springsure and the Chesterton Range. It also occurs in north-central Queensland in the Peak Range and White Mountains.

== Conservation status ==
Acacia gnidium is listed as of "least concern" under the Queensland Government Nature Conservation Act 1992.

== See also ==
- List of Acacia species
