= Gilgandra, New South Wales =

Town in New South Wales, Australia

Gilgandra
- Town
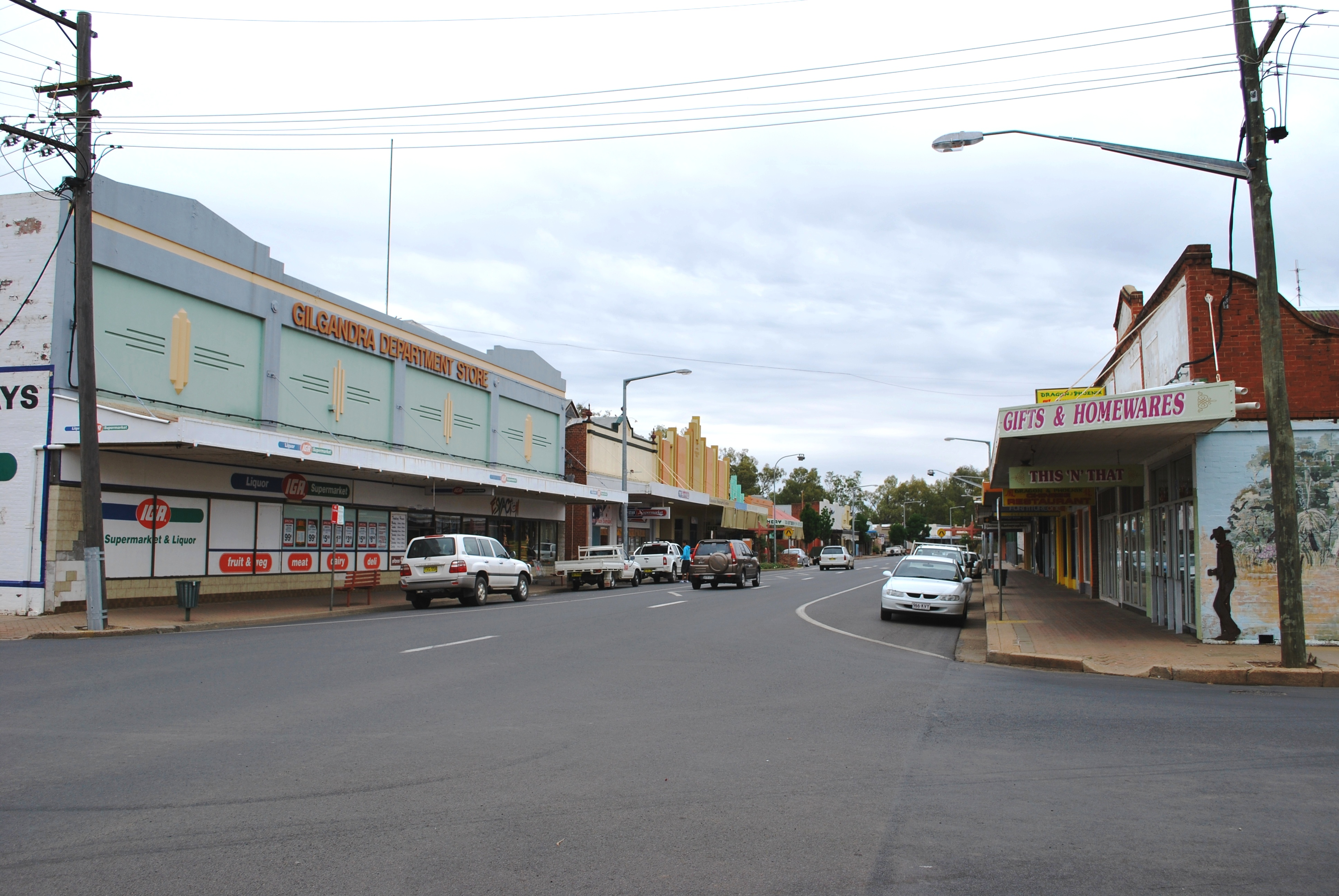
- The main street of Gilgandra, 2008

- Coordinates: 31°42′0″S 148°40′0″E
- Country: Australia
- State: New South Wales
- LGA: Gilgandra Shire
- Location: 460 km (290 mi) NW of Sydney; 66 km (41 mi) from Dubbo; 85 km (53 mi) E of Warren
- Established: 1888

Government
  - State electorate: Barwon
  - Federal division: Parkes
- Elevation: 282 m (925 ft)

Population
  - Total: 3,126 (2016 census)
- Postcode: 2827
- Mean max temp: 24.7 °C (76.5 °F)
- Mean min temp: 9.9 °C (49.8 °F)
- Annual rainfall: 566.3 mm (22.30 in)

Gilgandra is a country town in the Orana region of New South Wales, Australia, and services the surrounding agricultural area where wheat is grown extensively together with other cereal crops, and sheep and beef cattle are raised. The town is the administrative seat of the Gilgandra Shire.

Sited at the junction of the Newell, Oxley and Castlereagh highways, Gilgandra is located in a wide bend of the Castlereagh River, downstream from its source near Coonabarabran, directly downstream from Mendooran, and upstream from Gulargambone and Coonamble. It is 432 km north-west of Sydney (about six hours' driving time), and is located approximately half way along the inland route from Melbourne to Brisbane. It is known as the town of windmills and the home of the "Coo-ees", and is a gateway to the Warrumbungles National Park.

== Population ==
Historical population
Year	Pop.	±%
1954	2,032	—
1961	2,245	+10.5%
1966	2,414	+7.5%
1971	2,555	+5.8%
1976	2,494	−2.4%
1981	2,700	+8.3%
1986	2,713	+0.5%
1991	2,890	+6.5%
1996	2,822	−2.4%
2001	2,721	−3.6%
2006	2,679	−1.5%
2011	2,664	−0.6%
2016	2,595	−2.6%
2021	2,417	−6.9%
Source: Australian Bureau of Statistics data.

At the 2016 census, the population of Gilgandra township was 2,600. In the wider Gilgandra area, the population was 4,300, with 96.4% Australian-born and 13.8% identifying as Aboriginal. The largest category of employment was Agriculture and Forestry, which involved 28.6% of the population.

== Castlereagh Waterhole ==
The name Gilgandra came from Aboriginal word for the area, and means "long waterhole". The water level in the Castlereagh River is variable and the wide, sandy riverbed is frequently dry, or is reduced to a small stream. However, there was a large permanent waterhole in the river, 100 yards (91 m) long and 12 feet (3.7 m) deep, near where the township developed, and for many years subsequently. It was the source of the town's name.

== Windmills and artesian water ==
Gilgandra is situated above the subterranean water of the Great Artesian Basin (GAB) and, specifically, over the Surat Sub-basin of the GAB. Artesian water occurs where porous rocks below the surface, called aquifers, store and carry water underground. When bores are sunk to reach the aquifers, windmills can draw the water to the surface to be stored in tanks. Well over a hundred years ago, windmills were being used by townspeople to access Gilgandra's fresh, drinkable artesian water for their households, and by farmers to obtain water for their stock. Windmills were being advertised in the first Gilgandra newspapers in 1905, with several local people selling and installing them, including plumber Bill Hitchen, later famous for organising the 1915 Cooee march. From the early twentieth century, locals and others referred to Gilgandra as a "town of windmills", and many references to that can be found.

In 1948, it was reported that there were over 300 windmills in Gilgandra. Many can still be seen dotted around the town but few are now in use. The Gilgandra Shire Council built a reticulated water supply in 1966, reducing reliance on private windmills. The council draws on artesian water, operating a network of nine bores to supply water to Gilgandra. In 2016 Gilgandra had the largest single annual licensed entitlement to water from the Great Artesian Basin of any shire council in NSW, at 2,020 megalitres.

== History ==
Before the European squatters took up pastoral runs in the 1830s, the Gilgandra region was home to three Aboriginal language groups: the Gamilaraay, Wiradjuri and Wayilwan. According to archaeological evidence cited in the Warrumbungle National Park guidebook, indigenous groups are believed to have lived to the east of Gilgandra for at least 25,000 years, and in the Warrumbungle Ranges, 70 kilometres to the north, for about 17,000 years.

Gilgandra was proclaimed as a town in 1888, and the first town blocks were sold in 1889. While that was an impetus to growth, the area had been settled by a Europeans for many years before that. Gilgandra's Post Office was formally established in 1867, a local school had opened in 1881, and the first hearings were held in the Gilgandra court house in 1884. The Gilgandra Shire was constituted in 1906.

On 20 July 1900, an indigenous man, Jimmy Governor, murdered four members of the Mawbey family, and the children's governess, at their farming property just east of Gilgandra, in the area of Breelong. He was working as a fencing contractor for Mr Mawbey. The story of the murders received great publicity at the time. It was revived 1972 as the basis of a fictional work by Thomas Keneally, The Chant of Jimmie Blacksmith.

During World War I, a recruitment march to Sydney began in Gilgandra, known as the Coo-ee March. The men who enlisted on the way became known locally as "Coo-ees". The march was given its name because the marchers shouted the old bush call of "cooee" at each town along their journey to attract recruits. Twenty-six men left Gilgandra on 10 October 1915. At each town on the route, the marchers were feted and a recruitment meeting was held. By the time they reached Sydney, just over one month later on Friday 12 November 1915, the number of recruits had swelled to 263. They were welcomed on arrival in Sydney with huge crowds lining George Street near the Town Hall to welcome them and an official address given to them by the Minister for Works representing the Premier of New South Wales.

in 1919, as a peace thanksgiving, parishioners of St Ambrose Church in Bournemouth, England, grateful for the assistance England had received from the Dominions in defending the British Empire, decided to gift £1,200 to the town in the Empire with a good church and wartime service record. Gilgandra was chosen and the money funded the construction of St Ambrose Church, Gilgandra, which commenced in 1920.

== Climate ==
Gilgandra experiences a humid subtropical climate (Köppen: Cfa), with hot summers and cool winters. Rainfall is low throughout the year, with a slight peak in summer from thunderstorm activity.

Climate data for Gilgandra (Chelmsford Ave, 1915–1975 [incomplete], rainfall 1889–2025) 282 metres (925 ft) AMSL
Month	Jan	Feb	Mar	Apr	May	Jun	Jul	Aug	Sep	Oct	Nov	Dec	Year
Record high °C (°F)	45.8 (114.4)	43.9 (111.0)	39.4 (102.9)	36.7 (98.1)	31.7 (89.1)	27.2 (81.0)	23.9 (75.0)	28.9 (84.0)	35.0 (95.0)	37.5 (99.5)	43.3 (109.9)	42.8 (109.0)	45.8 (114.4)
Mean daily maximum °C (°F)	33.1 (91.6)	32.2 (90.0)	29.8 (85.6)	24.8 (76.6)	20.0 (68.0)	16.4 (61.5)	15.6 (60.1)	17.2 (63.0)	21.0 (69.8)	25.2 (77.4)	29.0 (84.2)	31.9 (89.4)	24.7 (76.4)
Mean daily minimum °C (°F)	17.3 (63.1)	17.4 (63.3)	14.6 (58.3)	10.3 (50.5)	6.1 (43.0)	3.9 (39.0)	2.5 (36.5)	3.4 (38.1)	5.9 (42.6)	9.4 (48.9)	12.6 (54.7)	15.9 (60.6)	9.9 (49.9)
Record low °C (°F)	4.4 (39.9)	4.4 (39.9)	2.2 (36.0)	−2.8 (27.0)	−5.6 (21.9)	−6.1 (21.0)	−6.7 (19.9)	−6.1 (21.0)	−4.4 (24.1)	−1.7 (28.9)	0.6 (33.1)	3.9 (39.0)	−6.7 (19.9)
Average precipitation mm (inches)	63.8 (2.51)	52.9 (2.08)	49.4 (1.94)	40.1 (1.58)	42.0 (1.65)	45.9 (1.81)	42.6 (1.68)	39.3 (1.55)	40.1 (1.58)	47.3 (1.86)	49.1 (1.93)	54.0 (2.13)	566.5 (22.3)
Average precipitation days (≥ 1.0 mm)	4.4	4.0	3.9	3.2	3.9	5.0	4.9	4.4	4.2	4.5	4.4	4.3	51.1
Source: Australian Bureau of Meteorology (Note: A maximum temperature of 36.1 °C (97.0 °F) was recorded in Gilgandra on 30 July 1961, but this temperature is noted as being "wrong" in a reference work on temperature extremes. It also does not appear in the Bureau of Meteorology's official extremes list for July in New South Wales, where the highest temperature is listed as 31.8 °C (89.2 °F). The given value for the highest maximum temperature for July in the table of 23.9 °C (75.0 °F) on 22 July 1946 is thus derived from a table of highest maximum temperatures for each month from the Bureau of Meteorology, excluding the 1961 temperature.)

== Heritage listings ==
Gilgandra has a number of heritage-listed sites, including:

- Myrtle Street: St Ambrose Church

== Attractions ==
=== Sport and recreation ===
Gilgandra has many sporting facilities. Local clubs support participation and arrange training and competitions.

The most popular sport in Gilgandra is rugby league. The Gilgandra Panthers rugby league team play in the Castlereagh Cup and have won the competition on six occasions, with the most recent being in 2018. They also won five premierships in the Group 14 competition which ran from 1949 until 2000, and won a Group 11 title in 1989 during their short stint in that competition.

Gilgandra's public swimming pool is located next to the town's main park and is open across the warmer months from October to end March. Learn-to-swim and exercise classes are held here. Set in lovely grassed grounds, the tiled pool was opened in October 1939 and is 33m long. There is also a children's play pool with good sun protection over. Grassed tennis courts are located on a corner opposite the swimming pool (corner Castlereagh and Willie Sts).

A 9-hole public golf course, with grass greens and a licensed club-house, is located on Racecourse Rd over the bridge from the main part of the town. Golf competitions are held regularly. The golf course is situated entirely within the town's horse racing track.

The town has a race course for horse racing, situated on Racecourse Road, where the Gilgandra Jockey Club arranges race meetings during the year, including the Gilgandra Cup held each January. The race course is picturesque with the town's golf fairways and greens inside the boundary of the track.

There is a youth club, which has squash courts, basketball courts, and an indoor area. A fitness centre operates out of the facility.

There are two main grassed recreation grounds where many different team and club sports are played (cricket, rugby league, football, Little Athletics). The town's original oval is located in Eiraben St and the Ernie Knight Oval is on Warren Rd.

Gilgandra Speedway is a popular track in the district where regular motor (car) racing events are held in many divisions. It is run by Gilgandra District Speedway Club which has hosted both state and national titles here at different times. The track is well fenced and is lit for night racing. It is located on the Newell Highway 4 km south of the township (direction of Dubbo).

=== Tourist attractions ===
The tourist information centre is located in the Cooee Heritage and Visitor Information Centre, at the south end of the town, on the Newell Highway. Coming from the direction of Dubbo, it is on the right-hand-side just after the grain silos and railway track crossing. Coming from Coonabarabran, Coonamble or Mendooran directions, it is along the river bank on the left-hand-side.

The Cooee Heritage and Visitor Information Centre houses several museums and galleries. The Gilgandra Art Gallery exhibits local and visiting artists in a range of mediums, and exhibitions are regularly changed. Aboriginal artefacts and ancient fossils and shells are displayed in the Joy Trudgett Gallery. Family history, including details of Gilgandra locals who enlisted in WW2, is on display in the Allan Wise Gallery where exhibitions are also regularly changed.

The Gilgandra Rural Museum displays and preserves an extensive collection of local farming equipment, and agricultural plant and machinery. It was established, and is run, by the volunteers of the Gilgandra Historical Society. The Museum is situated just along from the Cooee Heritage and Visitor Information Centre on the Newell Highway at the edge of Gilgandra and can be identified by a large display windmill outside. Particularly interesting large items include the Howard Rotary Hoe (a version of a cultivator) which was invented at Gilgandra, a Ridley Stripper, and a Ruston & Proctor Steam Traction Engine.

Windmill Walk commences at the Rural Museum and meanders along the Castlereagh River to the town centre. Picnic spots and BBQ facilities are located along the way.

The Gilgandra Native Flora Reserve is 8.5 ha of remnant bushland which features many plant species. The local wildflowers in the reserve are best seen from September to November. There are picnic and barbecue facilities.

Gilgandra has a privately owned observatory open to the public from Wednesday to Sunday.

Hitchen House Museum is set up in the house once owned and lived in by Bill Hitchen, who was the driving force for the Cooee March. Displays in the museum tell the story of the Cooee March. There is a good array of WWI memorabilia in the museum.

The Cooee March memorial is a stone cairn marking the spot in Bridge Street where local men commenced the Cooee March on 10 October 1915. A nearby wall mural contributes to the memorial. Recruitment marches like this were called Snowball marches, and sprang up elsewhere in NSW following the example of the Cooee March. The men assembled here in October 1915 to begin their recruitment drive by themselves marching to Sydney.

There is a community radio station WARFM, which is on 98.9FM, broadcasting a wide range of programs.

=== Annual events ===
- January – The Gilgandra Cup is a horse race run over 1600m at the Gilgandra Race Course. It is held in January each year during the annual two-day horse racing Gilgandra Cup Carnival, and is run by the Gilgandra Jockey Club. In 2018 the total prizemoney for the Gilgandra Cup was $35,000.
- April or May – The Gilgandra Show is an agricultural show held in April or May each year at the Gilgandra Showground at the western end of town on Warren Rd. It is run by the Gilgandra Show Society. In 2018 it was held on Friday 20th and Saturday 21 April. The annual show is a gathering point for the local community with displays of livestock, agricultural products and farm machinery, as well as ring events and equestrian competitions, woodchopping competitions, fun entertainment such as sideshows and rides, and food and drink stands.
- April – Senior Citizens Week and awards.
- October Long Weekend – Gilgandra Cooee Festival. Gilgandra organises a fun weekend festival of activities and entertainment for townspeople and visitors for many years on the October long weekend. There is a main street parade. On one day there is entertainment in the town park with wood chopping, stalls, rides, buskers, games competitions, and the coo-ee calling competition. There are sporting competitions such as golf. Live entertainment is offered in the evenings.

== Shops and services ==
=== Retail ===
Miller Street is the main street with a full offering of retail stores. Target Country closed its Gilgandra branch on 6 July 2019. However, the main street has a range of grocery providers with a bakery and a butcher and a grocery / liquor store. Farmers, and the community's hardware needs, are met by timber retailers, farm suppliers and farm machinery suppliers, and grain and timber stores as well as hardware store in the main street.

=== Professional services ===
Several different financial/legal professional services firms operate in the town, from two private legal firms, to an insurance broker, three accountants and business services firms. There is a combined real estate/stock & station agency.

=== Community and health services ===
- Medical – The Gilgandra Medical Centre is a one-stop centre for doctors' and other health services in the town. The town's GPs run their own independent practices but operate out of the medical centre. Appointments for visiting dentist and optometrist services are also made here. The centre was established as part of Rural and Remote Medical Services. The town has a large, modern pharmacy/chemist shop located in the main street.
- Hospital – Gilgandra's hospital is a modern, purpose-built 'Multi Purpose Health Service' with 31 beds situated in Chelmsford Avenue. It provides acute and sub-acute, emergency, and residential aged care. It also provides visiting practitioners and clinicians for allied health services. The nearest major referral hospital is only 40 minutes’ drive away at Dubbo.
- Aged Care – Retirement village and hostels. The Cooee Lodge Retirement Village situated next to the town's hospital facility offers detached retirement units for independent living, and a 40-bed hostel with an additional 10-bed special care wing. The Jack Towney Hostel is a separate 13-place Aboriginal and Torres Strait Islander Aged Care facility with 24-hour support staff.
- Community / Disability services – A Community Care Centre is located in the main street, run by NSW's Home and Community Care Program. It has an Aged Care Assessment Team, and clients are the frail, frail aged, and people with a disability.
- Orana Lifestyle Directions provides support services for people with intellectual disability who live in group homes within Gilgandra, while Carlginda Enterprises provides employment for people with disability and offers training for employment.

=== Education services ===
There are two primary schools and a public high school, all co-educational:

- Gilgandra Public School educates children from Kindergarten to Year 6 with around 190 pupils. It opened in October 1881, with centenary celebrations in 1981.
- St Joseph's Primary School is a Catholic systemic school from years K–6 with approximately 200 pupils. Founded in 1909 by the Sisters of St. Joseph from the Bathurst Diocese, it is now run by lay teachers.
- Gilgandra High School educates approximately 230 local teenagers from Year 7–12.

A Technical College (TAFE) campus offers vocational training in a range of trade and industry specific areas, such as business administration, and digital photography.

For the Under-5's, there is a professionally run community pre-school, and a private early childcare business also offers a pre-school program in addition to long day care.

=== Religious services ===
Like many towns in western NSW, Gilgandra has an array of churches offering services supporting their congregations. Many of these have their own web page with details of the times of their church services. The various churches are:

- Catholic – St Joseph's Church in Wrigley St. The Catholic community also runs St Joseph's primary school. The Sisters of St. Joseph are also represented at a convent located next to the church. A St Vincent de Paul centre, with a Vinnie's shop staffed by volunteers, is open daily and is located in Wamboin St between Warren Rd and Myrtle St.
- Anglican – St Ambrose Church on the corner of Myrtle and Wamboin Streets. The Anglican Minister's manse is located next door to the church.
- Uniting Church – corner Wamboin and Myrtle Streets.
- Presbyterian – at 42 Myrtle Street.
- Lutheran – located on the Newell Highway.
- Assemblies of God – New Life Centre, 74 Warren Road.
- Australian Indigenous Ministries (AIM) – 89 Wrigley St.
- Heartland Church – 44 Miller Street.

== Notable people ==
=== Civic minded ===
- Gerald Colin McKellar (1903–1970), farmer and politician, was born on 29 May 1903 at Gulgong, New South Wales, second child of native-born parents Gerald Murdoch McKellar, a carrier who turned his hand to farming, and his wife Margaret Jane, née Travis. Educated at Gilgandra and prominent in farming organizations, McKellar was a director (1951–1959) of the Dubbo Pastures Protection Board and a councillor (1960–1964) of the New South Wales Sheepbreeders' Association. He also chaired Gilgandra Newspapers Pty Ltd for two years. Committed to the Country Party, he led its Lawson and Castlereagh electorate councils for two decades before becoming chairman (1957) of the New South Wales division. In 1958 he was elected to the Senate. He was also Chairman of Committees including federal party's rural finance committee and Deputy President of the Senate from 1952–1964 and Minister for Repatriation from 1964–1970. The suburb McKellar in the ACT (2617) is named after him.
- Jim Curran (1927–2005), Gilgandra-born and raised, he was the local member for the Castlereagh electorate in NSW State Parliament from 1980 to 1981. Prior to that he had been very involved in the Gilgandra branch of the NSW Labor party in capacity as Secretary and then President for many years.
- William Thomas Hitchen (1864–1916), was a Gilgandra plumber and the Captain of the Gilgandra rifle club when WW1 commenced. He proposed the concept of a recruiting march from Gilgandra to Sydney, and was instrumental in making this a reality by organising the Cooee March which commenced in October 1915 from Gilgandra. Hitchen himself enlisted for the march and was shipped with troops to England. However, he died in England in 1916, not having seen active service.
- Ernie Knight (1943–1995), an Indigenous Australian, who worked for Gilgandra Shire Council for the thirty years of his working life, diligently and loyally maintaining the town's parks, gardens and recreational grounds. The Railway Oval was renamed in his memory in November 1995 as 'Ernie Knight Oval'.
- Tony McGrane (1946–2004), was Mayor of Gilgandra for 16 years. He then moved 40 miles south to Dubbo and became Mayor of Dubbo for eight years from 1991 until early 1999 when he ran as an independent for the seat of Dubbo. He won the seat of Dubbo, formerly considered a safe Country Party seat, by 24 votes from the Country Party. From 27 March 1999 until 15 September 2004 McGrane was then the member for the Dubbo electorate in the NSW State Parliament. Tony McGrane died in office on 15 September 2004.

=== Inventors ===
- Arthur Clifford Howard, known as "Cliff", (1893–1971), inventor of the rotary hoe (a version of a cultivator), whose father John Howard moved in 1908 from Crookwell to a property named "Mountain View" at Biddon near Gilgandra. In 1912 when his father introduced a steam tractor engine to his farm Cliff Howard had the idea of applying the tractor's power to blades that would turn the soil instead of compacting it as a pulled plough did. In 1912 Howard created and tested the prototype of his invention on "Mountain View", leading to his patenting the rotary hoe in 1919.

=== Pioneers ===
- Hannah Morris (1829–1911), pioneer of Gilgandra, resided in the area from 1852, innkeeper and landowner, and driving figure in establishing Gilgandra township.

=== Sportspeople ===
- Bob Foran (1938–2018), Gilgandra-born and raised horse trainer, owner and race caller. Bob's father, Vic Foran, was a well known Gilgandra horse trainer as was, in turn, Vic's own father – Jim Foran. Bob himself was widely known across the western NSW racing region, and in January 2015 reached the incredible milestone of calling his 60th Gilgandra Cup.
- John Farragher, OAM, (1957–2025), Gilgandra-born and raised rugby league player who attended Gilgandra High School and played rugby league for Gilgandra. He was selected for the Western Districts rugby league team in 1977. In 1978 he commenced playing First Grade rugby league with Penrith Panthers, aged 21. In May the same year, John was playing in prop position in only his seventh game with the Penrith club, when the scrum collapsed and John, underneath the collapse, became quadriplegic. Following his extensive rehabilitation efforts, Penrith Panthers employed John in a public relations capacity and he has been a familiar face at the door greeting and assisting visitors to the club for many years since. John was awarded an OAM in 2016 for services to rugby league and to the Penrith community.
- Johnny King (b.1942), rugby league winger from 1960 for twelve years with St George's First Grade side in the NSW Rugby League competition, whose first seven years with the club were on the winning grand final side, and who represented Australia fifteen times. Johnny King was born and raised in Gilgandra, the son of Cec King, a local mechanic, and was a Gilgandra jeweller's apprentice when he left for Sydney at the age of 16.
- Don O'Connor (b.1958), Gilgandra-born and raised cricketer played for Tasmania and for South Australia in the interstate Sheffield Shield competition 1981–1990.

=== War heroes WWI ===
- Herbert Foran (1893–1973), born in the Gilgandra area to grazier Thomas Foran and his wife Sarah (Green), he was raised by his parents on "New Berida" with nine siblings, and was farming there when he enlisted early in WW1. Herb Foran was awarded the French Medaille Militare in 1918.
- Leslie Greenleaf (1899–1980) was a recent British immigrant who was working on 'Dick's Camp' Collie when he enlisted in October 1915 for WW1, aged only 17, as one of the original Coo-ee marchers setting out from Gilgandra. He was awarded the Military Medal for action in March–April 1918 at Villiers-Bretonneux, France. Leslie Greenleaf was the last survivor of the original 35 men who commenced the Coo-ee march at Gilgandra.
- Thomas Henry Turvey (1893–1965) was born at Gulgong where his grandfather Frederick Turvey had settled after being transported on the "Charles Kerr" arriving NSW in 1837. Thomas Turvey was raised at Gilgandra when his parents, Thomas Isaac Turvey (1867–1950) and wife Mary, bought "Cedar Side" at Gilgandra. He was working at Gilgandra when he joined the Coo-ee March in October 1915 as one of the original 35 men commencing the march. His WWI military record shows that he signed up along the way on 4 November, aged 22, and was enlisted at Lawson in the Blue Mountains on 7 November. Tom Turvey was awarded the Military Medal for action in February 1917 at Guedecourt, France. This was "for bravery in the field". Turvey returned to Gilgandra during the 1940s and later moved to Sydney.

=== War heroes WWII ===
- Malcolm Foran DFC (1922–1979), son of Herbert Foran (See 'War Heroes WW1) and Grace, née Deans, Malcolm was Gilgandra-born and raised, and was a bomber pilot in the Royal Australian Air Force serving in England in WWII. He was awarded the Distinguished Flying Cross in 1944.
- Allan Donald McKellar (1917–1975), Gilgandra-born, son of Gerald Murdoch McKellar (d. March 1949) and Margaret, née Travis. Alan McKellar was a bomber pilot in the Royal Australian Air Force who served in England in WWII, and in mid 1944 received the King's Commendation for Valuable Service in the Air. Allan's father had purchased Gilgandra's "Eringanerin" property in 1907. Allan was farming on "Eringanerin" when he married Miss Lorraine Lucas of Gilgandra in 1940, and when he enlisted later the same year. He took over the running of the property on his return.
- Rawdon Middleton VC (1916–1942), was known as Ron Middleton and was the elder son of Frank Middleton and his wife Faith, née Miller. He was raised at Gilgandra as a teenager, became a bomber pilot in the Royal Australian Air Force in 1942, serving in WWII, and was posthumously awarded the Victoria Cross.
- Frank Morris VCF, raised at Balladoran near Gilgandra, bomber pilot in the Royal Australian Air Force serving in England during WWII, awarded the Distinguished Flying Cross in 1944. Frank Morris was the son of Welsh immigrants, Robert and Mary Morris, who settled first at Curban by 1911 and then at Balladoran on a property they named "Garthowen". Frank's mother died in 1938, before he enlisted, leaving him with three surviving brothers and three surviving sisters in addition to his father.
