= Cooee =

Shout used in Australia to get attention

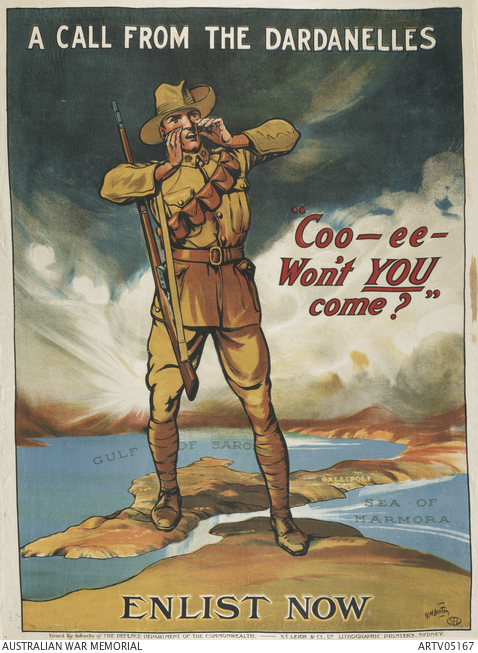
Australia World War I recruitment poster depicts an Australian soldier in the Dardanelles using the "Coo-ee" to summon reinforcements from Australia, 1915

Cooee! (/ˈkuːiː/) is a shout that originated in Australia to attract attention, find missing people, or to indicate one's own location. When done correctly—loudly and shrilly—a call of "cooee" can carry over a considerable distance. The distance one's cooee call travels can be a matter of competitive pride. It is also known as a call of help, distinct amongst the natural sounds of the bush.

The word "cooee" originates from the Dharug language of Aboriginal Australians in the Sydney area. The call was used by Aboriginal people to communicate with another person at a distance. 'Coo-ee' was typically expressed as a long loud call ending on a shrill rising inflection on the 'ee'. The call was later adopted by the colonial settlers and was widely used as a signal, especially in the bush. It means "come here" and has now become widely used in Australia as a call over distances.

== History and usage ==
As cooee is of Aboriginal origin, it is likely to have been in use by some Aboriginal peoples for many thousands of years.

The first recorded reference to the Aboriginal 'coo-ee' call is in the papers of Daniel Southwell, an officer of the Royal Navy and member of the crew of HMS Sirius that sailed with the First Fleet to Australia. He kept a journal and corresponded with his mother and uncle during his period in Sydney from 1788 to March 1791. Southwell's letters had many references to the Aboriginal people of the Port Jackson district and included a brief vocabulary of their language. In his papers Southwell listed the verb 'to come' as "Coo-sé, Cō-cé, Cō-eé, Cō-é".

Francis Barrallier, during his expedition in 1802, recorded the local Aboriginal people using the 'cooee' call near what is now Oakdale, New South Wales.

The explorer Thomas Mitchell, recording an incident in 1832 where one of his men came unexpectedly upon a native camp, wrote that "his debut [was] outrageously opposed to their ideas of etiquette, which imperatively required that loud cooeys should have announced his approach before he came within a mile of their fires." He further explained in a footnote, that a cooey was "The natives' mode of hailing each other when at a distance in the woods. It is so much more convenient than our own holla, or halloo, that it is universally adopted by the colonists of New South Wales."

Mitchell's observation indicates that the use of Cooee was not confined to the coast and mountains near Sydney, but was used more widely, by Aboriginal peoples, and by the 1830s was also widely used by the settler colonists.

Author and missionary to Tasmania, Reverend John West, reported in 1852 that "cooey" was "not unknown in certain neighbourhoods of the metropolis" (i.e., London).^{[A]} In 1864, an English slang dictionary reported: "Cooey, the Australian bush-call, now not unfrequently heard in the streets of London". One of Sir Arthur Conan Doyle's Sherlock Holmes mysteries hinges on the use of "cooee". "The Boscombe Valley Mystery", first published in 1891, is solved partly because, unlike everyone else, Holmes recognises the call as one commonly used among Australians. In 1917, the Anglo-Welsh poet Edward Thomas used "coo-ee" as the parting word with his wife Helen, on leaving for the Western Front from which he never returned; a fact commemorated at a 2014 Remembrance service in Glasgow.

The expression "within cooee" has developed within Australian as slang for "within a manageable distance". It is often used in the negative sense (i.e., "you're not even within cooee", meaning not close to or, a long way off). Another example would be: "They realised they were lost and there was no-one within cooee". It is also used in the abstract (e.g., "How much do you think they spent redoing this place?" "Oh, I don't know, five thousand dollars?" "You're not even within cooee—twenty-five thousand!").

The word cooee has become a name of many organisations, places and even events. Perhaps the most historic of these was the Cooee March during the First World War. It was staged by 35 men from Gilgandra, New South Wales, 766 km (476 mi) northwest of Sydney, as a recruiting drive after enthusiasm for the war waned in 1915 with the first casualty lists. They marched to Sydney calling "Cooee!" to encourage others to come and enlist. A poster read "Coo-ee – Won't you come?". When they reached Sydney on 12 December, the group had grown to 277. To this day, Gilgandra holds a yearly Cooee Festival in October to commemorate the event. Other Cooee Festivals occur across Australia.

Richard White indicates the important means of demonstrating Australian nationality with the call taking on a consciously nationalistic meaning. He also documents its spread through the Empire, to New Zealand and South Africa.

== Notes ==
A.John West (1852), The History of Tasmania – Volume II, Launceston, Tasmania: Henry Dowling (publisher), page 92. The full reference: "Like the natives of New South Wales, [the Tasmanian Aborigines] called to each other, from a great distance, by the cooey; a word meaning "come to me." The Sydney blacks modulated this cry, with successive inflexions; the Tasmanian uttered it with less art. It is a sound of great compass. The English, in the bush, adopt it: the first syllable is prolonged; the second is raised to a higher key, and is sharp and abrupt." [Footnote 35] "A female, born on this division of the globe, once stood at the foot of London bridge, and cooeyed for her husband, of whom she had lost sight, and stopped the passengers by the novelty of the sound; which, however, is not unknown in certain neighbourhoods of the metropolis. Some gentlemen, on a visit to a London theatre, to draw the attention of their friends in an opposite box, called out cooey; a voice, in the gallery, answered – 'Botany Bay!'"
