= Georges Plains railway station =

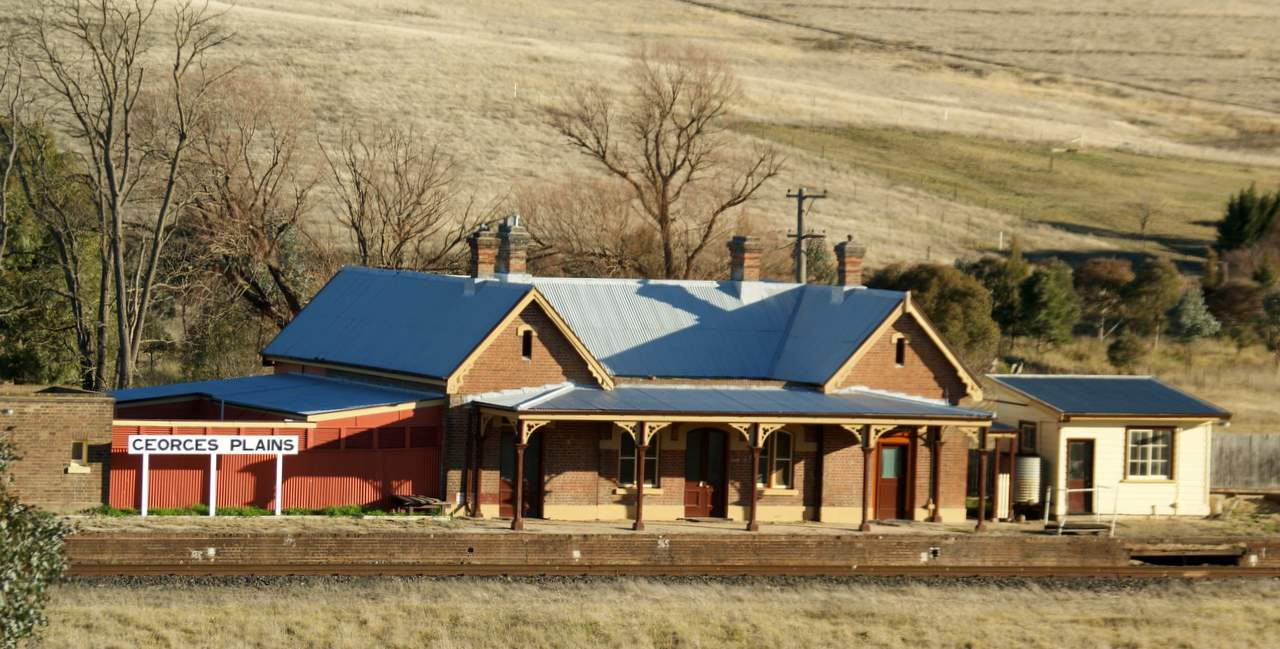

- Location within New South Wales Location within Australia
- 33°30′49″S 149°31′20″E
- Location: Main Western railway, Georges Plains, Bathurst Region, New South Wales, Australia

Site notes
- Owner: Transport Asset Manager of New South Wales

New South Wales Heritage Register
- Official name: Georges Plains Railway Station group
- Type: State heritage (complex / group)
- Designated: 2 April 1999
- Reference no.: 1147
- Type: Railway Platform/Station
- Category: Transport – Rail

Georges Plains railway station is a heritage-listed disused railway station located on the Main Western railway at Georges Plains, New South Wales, Australia. The former railway station was added to the New South Wales State Heritage Register on 2 April 1999. It is now a private residence.

== History ==
The station opened on 1 November 1876. Its date of closure is unknown.

== Description ==
The brick station building is a type 1, sub-type 2 building dating from 1876.

The platform faces are made of brick. The dock platform also survives.

The timber, skillion roofed signal box dates from 1913.

The platform signs and some station plantings are also within the heritage listing.

There is also a timber shed within the station precinct.

The station was reported to be in fair to good condition in 2005, with some loose roofing iron observed.

== Heritage listing ==
It is one of 6 similar structures to survive in an intact form, all of which had variations in expression and detail. Although the station building has been extended and minor changes have been made to the site it is a relatively intact small country station in good condition with an overall historic and visual unity that enhances its significance. The structures form, with the nearby classified Anglican church, a strong visual statement in the landscape and townscape particularly when viewed from the level crossing to the north.

Georges Plains railway station was listed on the New South Wales State Heritage Register on 2 April 1999 having satisfied the following criteria.

The place possesses uncommon, rare or endangered aspects of the cultural or natural history of New South Wales.

This item is assessed as historically rare. This item is assessed as scientifically rare. This item is assessed as arch. rare. This item is assessed as socially rare.

== See also ==
- List of disused regional railway stations in New South Wales
