= Isla Gorge National Park =

National park in Australia

- IUCN category II (national park)
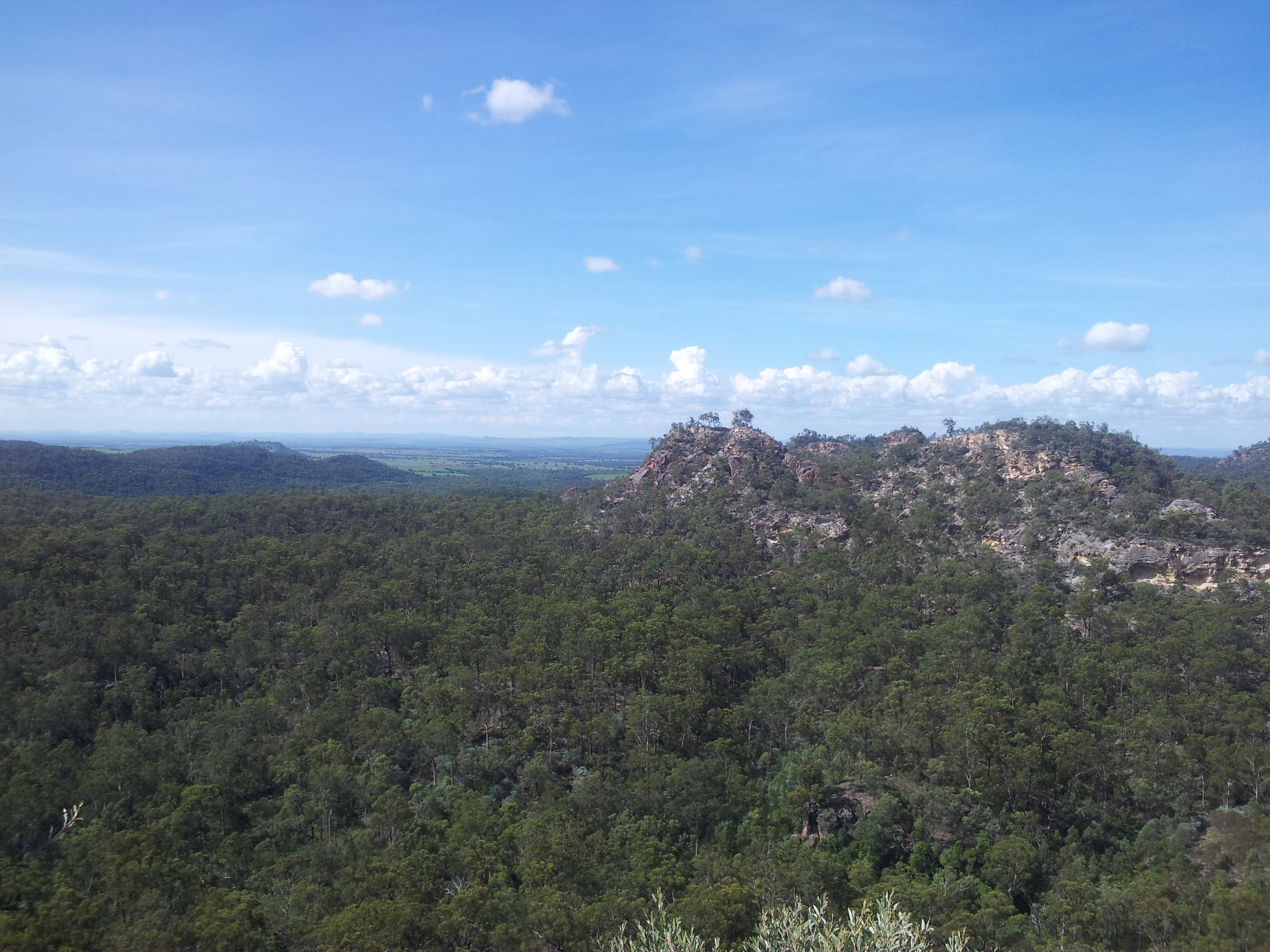

- Location within Queensland
- Location: Queensland
- Coordinates: 25°10′10″S 149°56′42″E
- Area: 78.5 km^{2} (30.3 sq mi)
- Established: 1964
- Governing body: Queensland Parks and Wildlife Service
- Website: Official website

Isla Gorge is a national park in Queensland, Australia, 415 km northwest of Brisbane, gazetted in 1964. It contains a rest area with toilets and a camping area, situated along the Leichhardt Highway just south of Theodore.

The national park is upon the traditional Aboriginal lands of the Kongabulla Clan of Iman country, the carpet snake people, and Wulli Wulli country.

The north-western section was expanded in 1990 to include the hand-laid rock road which once ran from Rockhampton to Roma as part of the wool run.

== See also ==
- Protected areas of Queensland
