= Murchison County =

Murchison New South Wales
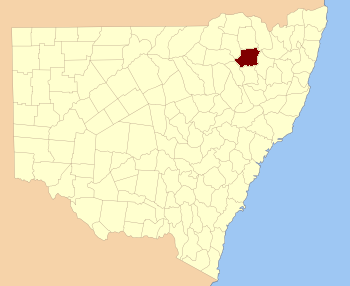
- Location in New South Wales
Lands administrative divisions around Murchison:
Courallie	Burnett	Arrawatta
Jamison	Murchison	Hardinge
Nandewar	Darling	Hardinge

Murchison County is one of the 141 cadastral divisions of New South Wales, Australia.

Murchison County is named in honour of Sir Roderick Impey Murchison (1792–1871) First Baronet and geologist.

== Parishes ==
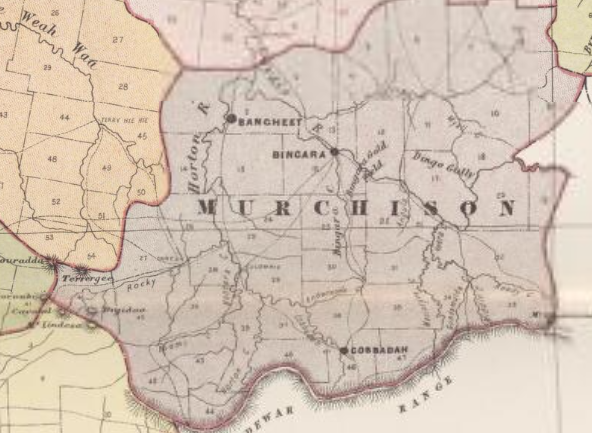
Murchison_County_(NSW)_Map_1886

A full list of parishes found within this county; their current LGA and mapping coordinates to the approximate centre of each location is as follows:

Parish	LGA	Coordinates
Anderson	Gwydir Shire	30°07′54″S 150°33′04″E
Austen	Gwydir Shire	29°59′54″S 150°21′04″E
Bangheet	Gwydir Shire	29°48′54″S 150°30′04″E
Bingara	Gwydir Shire	29°51′54″S 150°32′04″E
Boomi	Moree Plains Shire	30°12′54″S 150°18′04″E
Capel	Gwydir Shire	30°08′54″S 150°40′04″E
Caroda	Moree Plains Shire	29°59′54″S 150°15′04″E
Cobbadah	Gwydir Shire	30°14′54″S 150°34′04″E
Crawley	Gwydir Shire	30°14′54″S 150°28′04″E
Currangandi	Gwydir Shire	30°09′54″S 150°20′04″E
Delingera	Gwydir Shire	29°43′54″S 150°39′04″E
Delungra	Inverell Shire	29°36′54″S 150°45′04″E
Derra Derra	Gwydir Shire	29°52′24″S 150°30′04″E
Dingo	Gwydir Shire	29°52′54″S 150°50′04″E
Dinoga	Gwydir Shire	30°00′54″S 150°34′04″E
Drummond	Gwydir Shire	30°06′54″S 150°45′04″E
Dumboy	Gwydir Shire	29°39′54″S 150°41′04″E
Dunnee	Gwydir Shire	30°10′54″S 150°30′04″E
Durham	Gwydir Shire	29°48′54″S 150°44′04″E
Eulowrie	Gwydir Shire	30°03′54″S 150°07′04″E
Evans	Gwydir Shire	29°52′24″S 150°42′04″E
Furber	Gwydir Shire	29°56′54″S 150°51′04″E
Glass	Gwydir Shire	29°43′54″S 150°20′04″E
Gouron	Gwydir Shire	29°59′54″S 150°40′04″E
Gum Flat	Inverell Shire	29°43′54″S 150°59′04″E
Gundamulda	Gwydir Shire	30°14′54″S 150°45′04″E
Hall	Gwydir Shire	30°04′54″S 150°34′04″E
Horton	Gwydir Shire	30°11′54″S 150°24′04″E
Keera	Gwydir Shire	30°01′54″S 150°45′04″E
King	Gwydir Shire	30°04′54″S 150°28′04″E
Lindesay	Gwydir Shire	30°18′54″S 150°21′04″E
Little Plain	Inverell Shire	29°48′54″S 150°54′04″E
Macintyre	Gwydir Shire	30°04′54″S 150°41′04″E
McKinnon	Gwydir Shire	30°06′54″S 150°50′04″E
Mehi	Gwydir Shire	29°59′54″S 150°57′04″E
Milroy	Gwydir Shire	29°49′54″S 150°34′04″E
Munro	Gwydir Shire	30°01′54″S 150°50′04″E
Myall	Gwydir Shire	29°49′54″S 150°39′04″E
Paleroo	Gwydir Shire	30°06′54″S 150°08′04″E
Pallal	Gwydir Shire	29°59′54″S 150°26′04″E
Piedmont	Gwydir Shire	30°14′54″S 150°40′04″E
Pringle	Gwydir Shire	30°04′54″S 150°16′04″E
Rider	Gwydir Shire	29°51′54″S 150°19′04″E
Rusden	Gwydir Shire	30°13′54″S 150°13′04″E
Stag	Inverell Shire	29°47′54″S 150°50′04″E
Tange	Gwydir Shire	29°56′54″S 150°30′04″E
Turrawarra	Inverell Shire	29°41′54″S 150°40′04″E
Wyndham	Gwydir Shire	29°43′54″S 150°33′04″E
