= Bingara Shire =

Former local government area in New South Wales, Australia

Coordinates: 29.883°S 150.560°E

- Local government area
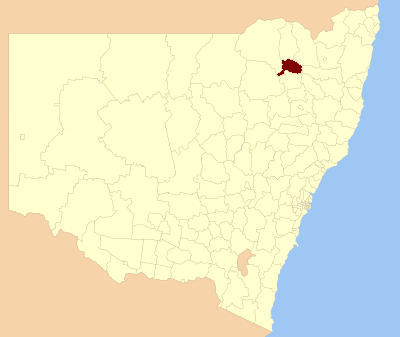
- Location within New South Wales

- Country: Australia
- State: New South Wales
- Region: New England
- Established: 1 January 1944
- Abolished: 17 March 2004
- Council seat: Bingara

Area
  - Total: 2,853.7 km^{2} (1,101.8 sq mi)

Population
  - Total: 2,029 (2004)
  - Density: 0.71101/km^{2} (1.8415/sq mi)
LGAs around Bingara Shire
Moree Plains	Yallaroi	Inverell
Moree Plains	Bingara Shire	Guyra
Narrabri	Barraba	Uralla

Bingara Shire was a local government area located in the New England region of New South Wales, Australia, about 150 kilometres (93 mi) north of Tamworth via Fossickers Way. The Shire, administered from the town of Bingara covered an area of 2,853.7 square kilometres (1,101.8 sq mi), and existed as a local government entity from 1906 until 2004, when it was amalgamated with Yallaroi Shire and part of Barraba to form the Gwydir Shire.

== History ==
After a petition by locals, the Bingara Municipality was established in the early 1890s to service the town, which at the time had a population of around 750. John Byrnes was chosen as the municipality's first mayor. With the passage of the Local Government Act 1906, which established shires all over New South Wales, the Gwydir Shire was gazetted to serve the surrounding district on 6 March 1906, and Byrnes was elected its first president.

On 17 December 1943, the Bingara Municipality and Gwydir Shire were amalgamated by proclamation into the new Bingara Shire, despite protests from both councils.

On 17 March 2004, Bingera Shire was abolished and merged with the Yallaroi Shire and part of Barraba to form a new Gwydir Shire.

== Towns ==
- Bingara
- Bangheet
- Caroda
- Dinoga
- Elcombe
- Gineroi
- Keera
- Myall Creek
- Pallal
- Riverview
- Upper Bingara

== Population ==
Year	Population
1921	2,637
1933	3,237
1947	2,862
1954	2,940
1961	2,851
1966	2,744
1971	2,486
1976	2,245
1981	2,264
1986	2,290
1991	2,133
1996	2,080
2001	2,002
