= John Henry Fleming =

Ringleader of the Myall Creek Massacre

John Henry Fleming (27 March 1816 – 20 August 1894) was an Australian-born squatter and stockman, who is best known as being the ringleader of the 1838 Myall Creek massacre which resulted in the murder of at least twenty-eight unarmed members of the Wirraayaraay people, Indigenous Australians who spoke a Gamilaraay language.

== Early life ==
Fleming was born in 1816 to parents Henry Fleming and Elizabeth Hall. The Halls and the Flemings were some of the first British families to take up land in the Hawkesbury River region of the British colony of New South Wales. Although Fleming's father was a significant landowner along the Hawkesbury, he also had many convictions for assault and liquor offences.

Fleming's brother, Joseph Fleming, was a squatter pastoralist who in 1830 received a grant of land at Central Macdonald to the north of the Hawkesbury. Fleming's uncle was Thomas Simpson Hall, also a notable squatter pastoralist in the northern regions of the colony. The Fleming brothers were very close to Hall, who had been instrumental in establishing the Hall family's Dartbrook and Gundebri properties in the Upper Hunter River region.

== Frontier pastoralist ==
In the mid-1830s, Hall with the help of the Fleming brothers, expanded his family's pastoral assets by appropriating large segments of land along the upper Namoi River at Cuerindi and Mundowey, near the modern day town of Manilla. Aboriginal resistance to the actions of Hall and the Flemings was fierce. In 1836, Hall moved further north, establishing the Bingara leasehold on the Gwydir River. Hall participated in frontier conflict with the local Aboriginal people while taking this land, receiving a spear wound while battling with the local "blacks".

In 1837, Fleming with his brother, took up land on the Mehi River naming their run 'Mungie Bundie'. Hall, continuing his close association with his nephews, took up a neighbouring run which he called 'Weebollabolla'. These holdings were located only a few miles from what is now the modern day town of Moree. Brutal frontier conflict with the local Gamilaraay people around 'Mungie Bundie' followed their arrival. Fleming was left in charge of the run, and became known for going out armed "after the blacks".

== Myall Creek massacre ==
In early June 1838, Fleming, armed and mounted on his horse, was conducting a punitive expedition against the local Aborigines from his 'Mungie Bundie' property. He headed eastward, forming a gang of eleven other vigilantes along the way. These men were Edward Foley, who was an assigned servant and stockman of Fleming's at 'Mungie Bundie'; James Oates, an assigned servant of Thomas Simpson Hall at Bingara; and nine other stockmen from nearby cattle stations including John Russell, George Palliser, John Johnston, Charles Kilmeister, William Hawkins, James Parry, James Lamb, John Blake and Charles Toulouse.

Fleming's gang arrived at the Myall Creek property held by Henry Dangar, where they heard that a large number of Aboriginal people were camped. They rode up to the station huts beside which a group of approximately thirty-five Aboriginal people were camped. They were part of the Wirraayaraay (also spelled 'Weraerai') group who belonged to the Kamilaroi people. They had been camped at the station for a few weeks after being invited by one of the convict stockmen, for protection from the gangs of marauding stockmen who were roaming the district slaughtering any Aboriginal people they could find. They were therefore well known to the whites. Most of them had been given European names such as Daddy, King Sandy, Joey, Martha and Charley. Some of the children spoke a certain amount of English. When the stockmen rode into their camp they fled into the convict's hut pleading for protection.

Fleming, being the only free man of the group, was clearly identified as the leader of the gang and, with the help of John Russell, he tied the Aboriginal people together on a long tether rope and led them away. They took them to a gully on the side of the ridge about 800 metres to the west of the station huts. There they slaughtered them all except for one young girl named Hippita of about seven years of age, whom they kept with them for "lascivious purposes". The approximately 28 people they murdered were largely women, children and old men. Ten younger men were away on a neighbouring station cutting bark. Most of the people were slaughtered with swords.

The children were beheaded while the men and women were forced to run as far as they could between the stockyard fence and a line of sword-wielding stockmen who hacked at them as they passed. After the massacre, Fleming and his gang rode off looking to kill the remainder of the group, who they knew had gone to a neighbouring station. On the party's return to Myall two days later, Fleming ordered the dismembering and burning of the corpses before resuming the search for the remaining people, who had gone to Peter MacIntyre's station at Keera, 30 kilometres to the south-east. Here another massacre of up to 16 Aboriginal people was reported, probably committed by Fleming and his stockmen. After several days of heavy drinking, Fleming's gang dispersed.

== Flees from arrest ==
When the manager of Myall Creek, William Hobbs, and the overseer of a neighbouring station, Thomas Foster, discovered the approximately twenty-eight bodies, they decided to inform a local squatter Frederick Foot. Foot reported the massacre to the Governor of New South Wales, George Gipps. Supported by the Attorney General, John Plunkett, Gipps ordered Police Magistrate Edward Denny Day at Muswellbrook to investigate the massacre.

Day thoroughly investigated the area despite the bodies having been removed from the massacre site where only a few bone fragments remained. He arrested eleven of the twelve perpetrators. The only one to escape was the only free man involved, the leader, John Henry Fleming. Day issued an arrest warrant for Fleming, noting that Fleming had been previously involved in other similar attacks against Aboriginal people. A reward of £50 was offered for Fleming's capture.

Fleming fled from the Gwydir region, with stories arising of him riding 350 miles in three days. He rode south, briefly changing horses at his uncle's property of Dartbrook, before heading to Morpeth where his horses were later found. Legends of Fleming then boarding a ship for Van Diemen's Land where he hid out have been shown to be false, a story invented to mask his true whereabouts. It is generally now accepted that in the months following the massacre Fleming was protected by his strong family connections in the Hawkesbury region, maintaining a low-profile probably residing at the Fleming stronghold of Central Macdonald.

== Allowed to live a normal life ==
Despite seven members of his gang later being found guilty at trial and hanged for the killings at Myall Creek, and despite the reward for his capture still being active, Fleming was soon able to come out of hiding and live a normal life, seemingly without any fear of arrest. In 1840, less than two years after the massacre, Fleming was able to marry Charlotte Dunstan, the daughter of respected colonist David Dunstan, in a public ceremony at Wilberforce. This is further remarkable when considering that one of the seven gang-members hanged was his own servant Edward Foley, while another was James Oates, the servant of his uncle Thomas Simpson Hall.

Fleming's freedom was protected by the fact that his brother, Joseph Fleming, had also returned to the Hawkesbury region where he was appointed in 1840 to the role of district chief constable of the police force even though his sibling was still a high-profile wanted felon.

Fleming was also able to continue to maintain his pastoral interests, owning considerable amounts of livestock on northern frontier leaseholds associated with his brother. It has been postulated that Fleming also continued to work as a stockman on his brother's northern properties, particularly at Talavera, near Surat, where there was bloody conflict with the local Aboriginal population.

== Later life and death ==
In his later years, Fleming was strongly associated with his local Church of England parish at Wilberforce. He became church warden and a committee member of the Hawkesbury Benevolent Society. In 1882, he became a Justice of the peace, despite a member of parliament, Joseph Palmer Abbott, raising the issue of Fleming's involvement in the Myall Creek massacre.

Fleming died, childless, in 1894 and was buried in the Church of England cemetery next to St John's Church in Wilberforce.
