= Keera, New South Wales =

Locality in New South Wales, Australia

Keera New South Wales
- Coordinates: 29°59′45.45″S 150°46′52.68″E
- Population: 45 (2016 census)
- Established: 1837
- Postcode(s): 2404
- Location: 510 km (317 mi) N of Sydney; 139 km (86 mi) N of Tamworth; 20 km (12 mi) SE of Bingara
- LGA(s): Gwydir Shire
- State electorate(s): Northern Tablelands
- Federal division(s): New England

Keera is a locality on the upper Gwydir River in Murchison County in the New England region of New South Wales, Australia. The nearest town is Bingara which is approximately 20km to the north-west.

== Geography ==
Keera is located on the junction of the Gwydir River and Keera Creek, and includes the hilly region extending south along the Keera and MacIntyre Creeks.

== History ==
Keera is on the lands of the Wirraayaraay people who lived in the Gwydir region. They had similar customs and culture to the neighbouring Gamilaraay group of Aboriginal Australians.

British colonisation of Keera began in 1837 with the arrival of Richard Wiseman, who established two cattle stations, later known by the names Cooringoora and Keera. Wiseman neglected to staff Keera, and within the year it was occupied by Alexander Campbell who formed a pastoral property on behalf of his employer, Peter MacIntyre. For the next few years Keera was simply known as 'MacIntyre's station'.

In June 1838, a vigilante gang of horsemen led by John Henry Fleming killed around 28 Aboriginal people at the nearby Myall Creek station in what has become known as the Myall Creek massacre. In the days after the massacre, Fleming's group came to 'MacIntyre's station' to kill Aborigines who had escaped the initial massacre. Reports indicate that around 10 more people were murdered by the gang at MacIntyre's, including an Aboriginal boy who was shot in the back.

In 1839, MacIntyre sold the run to Allan Macpherson, son of the chief bureaucrat in the colonial Government of New South Wales, William Macpherson. It was Macpherson who named the property 'Keera', probably a corruption of the local Aboriginal word gireye meaning crayfish.

From the late 1840s, Macpherson became involved in expanding his property interests into the northern frontier regions. He attempted to establish the Mount Abundance leasehold near what is now the town of Roma, Queensland, but strong Aboriginal resistance caused him to abandon the project and return to Scotland.

In 1858, Macpherson returned to Australia and sold Keera to Donald Munro, a Scottish storekeeper from Moree. The Munro family became prominent pastoralists in the area after the 1874 purchase of the 'Weebollabolla' property from the family of Thomas Simpson Hall. In 1887, Keera was sold off to Thomas Cook of Turanville, with Donald Munro's son Hugh R. Munro being retained as partner and manager of the property. Hugh R. Munro later bought Keera outright and expanded the family's pastoral business interests into the frozen beef and horse-racing industries. In 1926, Donald's grandson, Hugh Gordon Munro, established the Booroomooka Angus Stud at Keera, which today remains in operation under the Munro family. The wife of Hugh Gordon Munro, Grace Emily Munro, founded the Country Women's Association in 1922.

== Demographics ==
In 2016, the population of the Keera region was around 45 people.
