= Gwydir Shire (former) =

Former local government area in New South Wales, Australia

- Local government area
- Country: Australia
- State: New South Wales
- Region: New England
- Established: 7 March 1906
- Abolished: 1 January 1944
- Council seat: Bingara

Gwydir Shire was a local government area in the New England region of New South Wales, Australia.

Gwydir Shire was proclaimed on 7 March 1906, one of 134 shires created after the passing of the Local Government (Shires) Act 1905.

The shire offices were based in Bingara.

The Shire was amalgamated with the Municipality of Bingara to form Bingara Shire on 1 January 1944.
