= Myall Creek massacre =

1838 killing of Indigenous people in New South Wales

Coordinates: 29.7813°S 150.7127°E

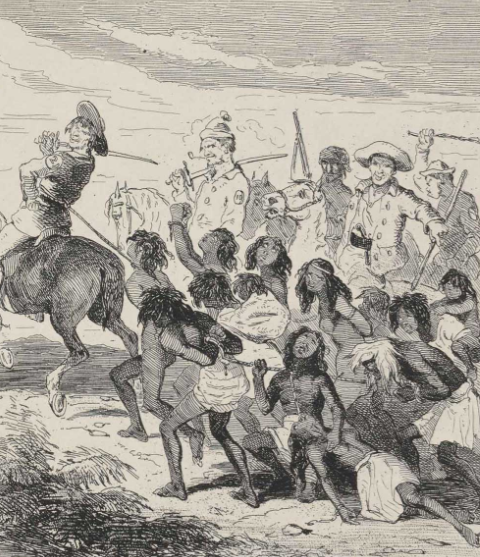
- Date: 10 June 1838; 188 years ago
- Location: Myall Creek, New South Wales, Australia
- Outcome: 7 perpetrators executed; 4 accused acquitted; the accused leader never arrested
- Deaths: 28+
- Accused: John Henry Fleming and 11 assigned convicts
- Convicted: Charles Kilmeister, James Oates, Edward Foley, John Russell, John Johnstone, William Hawkins, and James Parry

The Myall Creek massacre was the killing of at least 28 unarmed Aboriginal people in the Colony of New South Wales by eight colonists on 10 June 1838 at the Myall Creek in the north of the colony. Seven perpetrators were convicted of murder and hanged.

This was one of the few alleged massacres of Aboriginal people to have been proven in court. After two trials, seven perpetrators of twelve accused were found guilty of murder and sentenced to death by hanging. Four men were never retried on additional charges following their acquittal in the first trial. The leader of the perpetrators, free settler John Henry Fleming, evaded arrest and was never tried. The trials and guilty verdicts sparked extreme controversy within New South Wales settler society.

== Description of the massacre ==
In the 1830s white settlers were expanding into the northern area of the colony of New South Wales (New England), near the Gwydir River, the traditional lands of the Kamilaroi people. These colonists ran livestock and cultivated crops which led to competition for resources. The Aboriginal people resisted, sometimes attacking livestock or settlers, and there was violence on both sides.

John Henry Fleming, a free man from Mungie Bundie Run near Moree, gathered a group of armed men to respond. They consisted of eleven stockmen, both former convicts and assigned convicts (who were essentially indentured workers to employers). Ten were white Europeans and one, John Johnstone, was a black African. They arrived by horseback at Henry Dangar's Myall Creek station in New England on 9 June 1838.

A group of approximately thirty-five Aboriginal people were camped near the huts of the station. They were part of the Wirraayaraay (also spelled 'Weraerai') group who belonged to the Kamilaroi people. They had been invited a few weeks before by Charles Kilmeister (or Kilminister), one of the convict stockmen, to camp at the station for safety and protection from the gangs of marauding stockmen in the district. These whites were slaughtering any Aboriginal people they could find.

These Aboriginal people had previously been camped peacefully at Peter MacIntyre's station at Keera for a few months. They were well known to the whites. Most of them had been assigned such English names as Daddy, King Sandy, Joey, Martha and Charley. Some of the children already spoke a certain amount of English.

When the stockmen rode into their camp, the Wirraayaraay fled to Kilmeister's hut pleading for protection.

George Anderson, the station hut keeper, asked the white men what they were going to do with the Aboriginal people. John Russell said they were going to "take them over the back of the range and frighten them". The stockmen entered the hut, tied the Aboriginal people to a long tether rope and led them away.

The stockmen took the group to a gully on the side of the ridge about 800 m (2,600 ft) to the west of the station huts. There they killed them all except for one woman, who they kept with them and gang raped for the next couple of days. The 28 corpses found at the site were mostly women, children, and old men. Ten younger men were away on a neighbouring station, having been hired to ring-bark trees. Apparently most of the people were slaughtered with swords. George Anderson, who refused to join the massacre, said he heard only two shots. Unlike Anderson, Charles Kilmeister joined the slaughter.

Testimony was later given at trial that the stockmen had beheaded the children. They forced the men and women to run as far as they could between the stockyard fence and a line of sword-wielding stockmen, who hacked at them as they passed. After the massacre, Fleming and his gang rode off looking to kill the men who they knew had gone to the neighbouring station.

Those Aboriginal men returned to Myall Creek that night and left after being warned that the killers would be returning. When the whites returned to Myall two days later, they dismembered and burnt the bodies before resuming the search for the remaining people.

The ten Wirraayaraay had gone to MacIntyre's station at Keera, 30 kilometres to the south-east. There between 10 and 20 Aboriginal people were soon reported as murdered and their bodies were burned on a large fire. Many suspect this massacre was committed by the same stockmen as at Myall Creek. After several days of heavy drinking, the party dispersed.

When William Hobbs, the manager of Myall Creek station, returned several days later and discovered the bodies, he counted up to twenty-eight (as they were beheaded and dismembered, he had difficulty determining the exact number). He decided to report the incident but Kilmeister initially talked him out of it. Hobbs discussed it with a neighbouring station overseer, Thomas Foster. He told squatter Frederick Foot, who rode to Sydney to report it to the new Governor, George Gipps. Supported by Attorney General John Plunkett, Gipps ordered Police Magistrate Edward Denny Day at Muswellbrook to investigate the massacre.

Day conducted a thorough investigation although the bodies had by then been removed from the massacre site, and only a few bone fragments remained. He arrested eleven of the twelve perpetrators. The only one to escape was John Fleming, the leader and only free man. George Anderson was crucial in identifying the arrested men. He had initially refused to name any but, after learning that the massacre had been planned more than a week earlier to coincide with the absence of Hobbs, he agreed to identify the killers to the magistrate.

== Trials ==
Beginning on 15 November 1838, the case was heard before the Chief Justice of New South Wales, James Dowling. The accused were represented by three of the colony's foremost barristers, William Foster, William à Beckett and Richard Windeyer, paid for by an association of landowners and stockmen from the Hunter Valley and Liverpool Plains region. Henry Dangar, the owner of the Myall Creek station, was among those supporting the defence.

This secret group called themselves The Black Association. They were led by a local magistrate, who apparently used the influence of his office to gain access to the prisoners in Sydney. He told them to "stick together and say nothing". Not one of the eleven accused gave evidence against their co-accused at the trial. Governor Gipps attributed their silence to the magistrate's influence.

=== First trial ===
R. v. Kilmeister (No. 1) – The station hutkeeper, George Anderson, was the only white witness and key for the prosecution, conducted by Attorney General Plunkett and Roger Therry as his junior counsel. He told the court how the eleven men had tied the victims together, and led them away. He also said that Edward Foley, one of the perpetrators, had shown him a sword covered with blood. Anderson's testimony was supported by William Hobbs and Magistrate Day, who had conducted the police investigation. The defence's case rested solely on the argument that the dismembered bodies could not be identified accurately.

Justice Dowling advised the jury that the law made no distinction between the murder of an Aboriginal person and the murder of a European person. The jury, after deliberating for twenty minutes, found all eleven men 'not guilty.' A letter to the editor of The Australian on 8 December 1838 alleged that one of the jurors had said privately that although he considered the men guilty of murder, he could not convict a white man of killing an Aboriginal person, he purportedly said:

"I look on the blacks (said this enlightened and philanthropic juror) as a set of monkeys and the sooner they are exterminated from the face of the earth the better. I would never consent to hang a white man for a black one. I knew well they were guilty of murder, but I, for one, would never see a white man suffer for shooting a black"

The letter writer said he did not hear these statements directly, but had spoken to a second man who told him he had heard a juror say it. The letter writer continued, "I leave you, Sir, and the community to determine on the fitness of this white savage to perform the office of a juryman under any circumstance".

=== Second trial ===
R. v. Kilmeister (No. 2) – Attorney-General Plunkett requested the judge to remand the prisoners in custody awaiting further charges from the same incident. Although all eleven were remanded in custody, only seven faced a second trial. The second trial was held on 27 November. Only 28 of the 48 men called up for jury service turned up. Later it was learned that the Black Association had intimidated many into staying away.

The trial started on 29 November under Justice Burton. Anderson, who had been the key witness at the first trial, testified again. He told the court:

While Master was away, some men came on a Saturday, about 10; I cannot say how many days after master left; they came on horseback, armed with muskets and swords and pistols; all were armed ... the blacks, when they saw the men coming, ran into our hut, and the men then, all of them, got off their horses; I asked what they were going to do with the blacks, and Russel said, "We are going to take them over the back of the range, to frighten them".

Anderson testified that the Aboriginal people in the hut had cried out to him for assistance. He said two women were left behind at the huts, one "because she was good-looking, they said so". He said that a young girl who had been left behind attempted to follow her mother (who was tied up with the others). Anderson took her back to he hut. He said two young Aboriginal boys escaped by hiding in the creek. Anderson also testified about the perpetrators' return and the burning of the bodies.

I [Anderson] saw smoke in the same direction they went; this was soon after they went with the firesticks ... Fleming told Kilmeister to go up by-and-by and put the logs of wood together, and be sure that all [of the remains] was consumed ... the girls they left, and the two boys, and the child I sent away with 10 black fellows that went away in the morning ... I did not like to keep them, as the men might come back and kill them.

Anderson said he wanted to speak the whole truth at the second trial. He also said he did not seek to be rewarded for testifying, rather he asked "only for protection". The trial continued until 2 am on 30 November, when the jury found the seven men guilty. Initially, the foreman had stated that the men had been found 'not guilty'. However, one juror immediately rose and stated that there had been a mistake. They had only acquitted the defendants on separate charges. However, they had found the men guilty of the murder of a single six-year-old Aboriginal child whose name was unknown. According to the indictment, the murder had been committed "by shooting with a pistol, cutting with a sword, and beating, casting into a fire, and keeping the child there until death ensued".

On 5 December, all of the defendants were sentenced to death by hanging. At sentencing, Justice Burton gave a speech. A reporter present summarized what Burton, who teared up as he spoke, said.

This is not a case where any provocation has been given, which might have been pleaded in excuse for the deed...

The murder was not confined to one man, but extended to many, including men, women, children, and babies hanging at their mothers' breasts, in numbers not less than 30 human souls — slaughtered in cool blood. This massacre was committed upon a poor defenceless tribe of Blacks, dragged away from their fires at which they were seated, resting secure in the protection of one of the prisoners. Unsuspecting harm, they were surrounded by a body of horsemen, 12 or 13 in number, from whom they fled to the hut, which provided the mesh of destruction. In that hut the prisoners, unmoved by the tears, groans, and sighs, bound them with cords — fathers, mothers, and children indiscriminately – and carried them away to a short distance, when the scene of slaughter commenced, and stopped not until all were exterminated, with the exception of one woman.

I do not mention these circumstances to add to the agony of that moment, but to portray to those standing around the horrors which attended this merciless proceeding, in order, if possible, to avert similar consequences hereafter.

It appears that extraordinary pains have been taken by the prisoners, or by some persons deeply interested in the concealment of their crime, to prevent the murder from coming to light. But, it has pleased Almighty God to conduct a person to that heap of human remains, to be a witness of the scene, before the heap was taken away bit by bit, as it evidently had been, to remove every vestige of the murder.

The crime was, however, committed in the sight of God, and the blood of the victims cries for vengeance.

The sentence was ratified by the Executive Council of New South Wales on 7 December. Governor Gipps later reported that no mitigating circumstances could be shown for any of the defendants, and it could not be said that any of the men were more or less guilty than the rest.

As the execution date for the convicts drew closer, public outrage over the trials increased. Editorials in The Sydney Morning Herald openly advocated genocide. One writer claimed that the executions would be "nothing short of legal murder" and would "incite an actual war of extermination" against the natives if carried out. The paper also attacked Gipps's sympathies for the Aboriginal people.

"Are the white settlers and their servants to be protected against the outrages of the blacks? Are blacks to be hanged for murder as well as whites? And if so, what steps have been taken to apprehend and hang the scores of black murderers who have shed the blood of white British subjects?"

The Herald listed examples of alleged Aboriginal crimes, before continuing:

"Are all these outrages to be enveloped in obscurity—is all this blood to be unavenged, and yet white men to be hanged for slaying blacks, perhaps in self-defence, perhaps in retaliation for injuries previously sustained? No attempt has been made, by means of a properly organized force on the frontiers of the Colony, to keep the blacks in subjection, by means, simply, of intimidation."

In fact, the British had carried out punitive actions against Aboriginal people since the 1790s, and the lawyers for the defendants had never claimed self-defence.

Gipps refused to grant clemency in the case. The seven men, Charles Kilmeister, James Oates, Edward Foley, John Russell, John Johnstone, William Hawkins and James Parry, were executed early on the morning of 18 December 1838 at Darlinghurst Gaol. Following the executions, Henry Keck, the chief of the prison, said all of the convicts had confessed.

"Sir, in compliance with your suggestion to me yesterday, respecting the seven men executed on Tuesday morning, I have the honour to inform you, that frequently, during their confinement here, they each and all, at different times, acknowledged to me their guilt; but implied, that it was done solely in defense of their masters' property, that they were not aware that in destroying aboriginals they were violating the laws, or that it could take cognizance of their having done so, as it had (according to their belief) been so frequently done in the colony before."

The four remaining accused, Blake, Toulouse, Palliser and Lamb, were remanded until the next session to allow time for the main witness against them, an Aboriginal boy named Davey, to be prepared in order to take a Bible oath. It has been claimed that according to missionary Lancelot Edward Threlkeld, Henry Dangar had arranged for Davey "to be put out of the way", and he was never seen again. With Davey unable to be located, the government released the four suspects in February 1839.

But, Threlkeld made no such statement regarding Dangar. What Threlkeld wrote about Davey's whereabouts at the time was:

... for Mr Arndell, who was here last week, states that on his recent return from the Gwyder he was informed by a Gentleman that Davey was put out of the way, but whether with his throat cut, or only hid, could not be ascertained.

Further, when the remaining four accused came before the Court on 14 February 1839, Attorney General Plunkett informed the Court:

... [Davey] had been under the tuition of a competent person for two months, but it was now reported to [the Attorney General] that he was not so far instructed as to be a competent witness, and it was quite uncertain when he would be; and he [the Attorney General] did not think he should be doing his duty in risking public justice by prosecuting the case without his evidence.

...

I cannot proceed with the trial with any hope of success without [Davey's] evidence ....

According to Plunkett, in mid-February 1839 Davey was alive and "under tuition", however, Plunkett could not proceed with the case against the remaining accused because of the uncertainty surrounding the time it would take to complete that tuition. It was for this reason that the accused were discharged.

I have just returned from seeing the seven men all launched into eternity at the same moment it was an awful sight and has made me feel quite sick – I shall never forget it.

— J. H. Bannatyne, Letter from J. H. Bannatyne to Other Windsor Berry Esq. relating to the Myall Creek Massacre, 17 December 1838

== Subsequent events and responses ==
=== 19th century ===
John Henry Fleming, the leader of the massacre, was never captured. He hid or was protected, either in the Hawkesbury district, on a relative's property inland from Moreton Bay, or in Van Diemen's Land (according to conflicting reports that remain unresolved). He later became a respected farmer, church warden and justice of the peace in the Hawkesbury district. John Blake, one of the four men acquitted at the first trial and not subsequently charged, committed suicide in 1852. One of his descendants believes he did so out of a guilty conscience.

The Myall Creek case led to significant uproar among sections of the population and the press, more so voiced in favour of the perpetrators. The Sydney Herald was particularly strident, declaring in October 1838 that "the whole gang of black animals are not worth the money the colonists will have to pay for printing the silly documents on which we have already wasted too much time". In November 1838 the paper's editorial said if Aboriginal Australians, referred to as the "filthy, brutal cannibals of New Holland" and "ferocious savages", attempt to destroy property or kill someone, "do to them as you would do to any white robbers or murderers — SHOOT THEM DEAD."

Not all newspapers or white settlers took the same view. The Australian published a poem by Eliza Hamilton Dunlop, "The Aboriginal Mother", on 13 December 1838, about a week after the seven men were found guilty, but several days before they were hanged. The poem expresses Dunlop's sorrow over the massacre and expresses sympathy for the Aboriginal people of Australia. Dunlop responded to criticism by the Sydney Herald, arguing on behalf of the poem and explaining why her views were correct.

The editorial in John Dunmore Lang's newspaper The Colonist on 12 December 1838 argued at length that "the murders... are, to a serious extent, chargeable upon us as a nation".

The Myall Creek massacre is often cited as the only massacre of its kind in colonial Australia for which white people were subsequently convicted and executed for killing Aboriginal people. But there was at least one case prior to Myall Creek in which whites were held responsible.

In 1820, two convicts, John Kirby and John Thompson, attempted to escape from the colony but were captured by local Aboriginal people and returned to Newcastle. A military party accompanied by two constables set out to meet them.

They saw Kirby stab Burragong (alias King Jack), whereupon he was felled by a waddy. Burragong initially appeared to recover, saying that he was murry bujjery (much recovered) and collected his reward of a "suit of clothing". However, he later complained of illness. Ten days after being wounded, he died from the stabbing.

Kirby and Thompson were both tried for "willful murder". All the European witnesses testified that "no blow was struck by any native" before Kirby attacked Burragong. Thompson was acquitted, but Kirby was found guilty and sentenced to death, with his body to be "dissected and anatomised".

The Myall Creek massacre was the latest of many massacres that took place in that district (the Liverpool Plains) around that time. As elsewhere in the colony, the Aboriginal people at times resisted the expanding invasion of their land by spearing sheep and cattle for food and sometimes attacking the stockmen's huts and killing the white men. In the Liverpool Plains district, some cattle had been speared and huts attacked, with two whites killed (allegedly by Aboriginal people). The squatters complained to Acting Governor Snodgrass, who sent Major James Nunn and about 22 troopers up to the district. Nunn enlisted the assistance of up to 25 local stockmen and together they rode around the district killing any Aboriginal people they came across. Nunn's campaign culminated in the Waterloo Creek massacre of 1838 at Waterloo Creek. Although no definitive historical records are available of the event, estimates of Aboriginal people murdered range from 40 to more than 100.

When Nunn returned to Sydney, many of the local squatters and stockmen continued the "drive" against the Aboriginal people, including the Myall Creek massacre. However, because of community outrage, Governor Gipps did not encourage further prosecutions after this. Neither the Waterloo Creek massacre nor the later McIntyre's Station massacre were prosecuted, although each was said to have resulted in a greater number of Aboriginal deaths.

In his book, Blood on the Wattle (1998), travel journalist Bruce Elder says that the successful prosecutions of the Myall Creek massacre resulted in pacts of silence among whites becoming a common practice to avoid sufficient evidence becoming available for future prosecutions. Two Sydney newspapers reported that poisoning Aboriginal people became more common, considered "much safer" for whites than outright attacks. Many massacres went unpunished due to these practices, as what is variously called a 'conspiracy' or 'pact' or 'code' of silence fell over the killings of Aboriginal people.

The Myall Creek massacre and the subsequent trial and hanging of some of the offenders had a profound effect on the "outside" settlers and their dealing with indigenous people throughout all sections the colonial Australian frontiers. The Sydney Herald and the spokesmen for the settlers in the remote districts of New South Wales and Victoria, frequently leading men such as William Wentworth, typically classified the trial and execution of the offenders as "judicial murder". Similar opinions were voiced years later in Queensland, the most populated section of the continent in terms of indigenous people, where it was the subject of numerous statements in the then newly separated parliament. In 1861, there was almost unanimous agreement that the prosecution and hanging in 1838 had been nothing less than '...judicial murder of white men in Sydney', as the government spokesman Robert Ramsay Mackenzie phrased it in his speech in the Legislative Assembly on 25 July, and that 'white troopers were "useless" as they could not be "acting against the blackfellows as they wished, lest an outcry should be raised against them, and they could be prosecuted for murder."' Arthur Macalister, spokesman for the opposition (later three times Premier of Queensland) agreed, equally using the term "judicial murder". The notion seemingly almost unanimously agreed to by the first Queensland parliament was that no white man should ever be prosecuted in Queensland for the killing of a black.

=== 21st century legacy ===
On 9 June 2023, ahead of the 185th anniversary of the massacre, The Sydney Morning Herald published an editorial that apologised for its part in "spreading racist views and misinformation while campaigning for the killers to escape justice". It said that its disapproval of the death sentence for the 7 of the 12 men involved was "not due to a lack of evidence or genuine doubts over the integrity of any legal process, but because the perpetrators were white and the dead black". It admitted that its coverage was out of step with other reporting at the time, and also apologised for other articles encouraging readers to kill Aboriginal people if they felt "threatened".

== Stockyard controversy ==
Over the years there has been some debate over the exact location of the massacre. An oral tradition developed among stockmen who worked on the Myall Creek station, many years after the massacre occurred, that it had happened in a stockyard to which the Wirrayaraay were led by the stockmen. Although this oral tradition is strongly held by some local descendants of the stockmen and others, there is no primary source evidence from the time to support the idea.

All the evidence collected by Police Magistrate Edward Denny Day and provided in evidence at the two trials contradicts the suggestion that it occurred in a stockyard. Witnesses William Hobbs, Thomas Foster, Andrew Burrowes and Edward Denny Day himself describe the massacre site without making any mention of a stockyard. Hobbs stated in evidence to the Supreme Court that the stockyard was close to the huts whereas the massacre site was "about half a mile from my house in a westerly direction". Historians dismiss the stockyard as the location of the massacre as a "bush myth".

== Memorial ==
Lyall Munro Snr, a descendant of victims of the massacre, worked long and hard toward getting a memorial erected to mark the event.

On 10 June 2000, a memorial to the victims of the massacre, 23 km (14 mi) north-east of Bingara at the junction of Whitlow and Bingara-Delungra Roads, was unveiled. It consists of a 600 m (2,000 ft) walkway, with seven oval-shaped granite boulders along the way, each with a plaque relating elements of the history, to a 14-tonne granite rock and plaque surrounded by a circle of crushed white granite and edged by stones from all around the state of New South Wales. It overlooks the site of the massacre. In 2001, a group of law students from the University of New England had an excursion to the site where they were welcomed by the Blacklock mob, who conducted a smoking ceremony. A ceremony is held each year on 10 June commemorating the victims. The memorial is maintained and funded by the Friends of Myall Creek, an Australian non-profit organisation made up of both Aboriginal and non-Aboriginal members.

The memorial was vandalised in January 2005, with the words "murder", "women" and "children" chiselled off, in an attempt to make it unreadable.

On 7 June 2008, some 172 years after the events, the Myall Creek Massacre and Memorial Site was included on the Australian National Heritage List. It was placed on the New South Wales State Heritage Register on 12 November 2010.

The site was again reported as vandalised on 24 September 2021. There was damage to buildings, sandstone steps and railings. A memorial plaque was also vandalised, but the committee was unsure if this was done by the same perpetrators. Co-chair of the national Friends of Myall Creek committee, Keith Munro, confirmed a racist slogan was scratched into the ground.

== Painting ==
Sydney artist Ben Quilty created a painting of the massacre, based on a Rorschach ink blot, a technique he had used in previous paintings, entitled Myall Creek Rorschach. He consulted Gamilaraay elders Aunty Sue Blacklock and Uncle Lyall Munro before commencing his sketches for the work.

A TV documentary, Quilty: Painting the Shadows, made by filmmaker Catherine Hunter and featuring this and other work by Quilty, was shown on ABC TV in November 2019.

== See also ==
- List of massacres in Australia
- List of massacres of Indigenous Australians
- Fall Creek massacre
