= Grace Emily Munro =

(1879–1964) a founder of the Country Women's Association

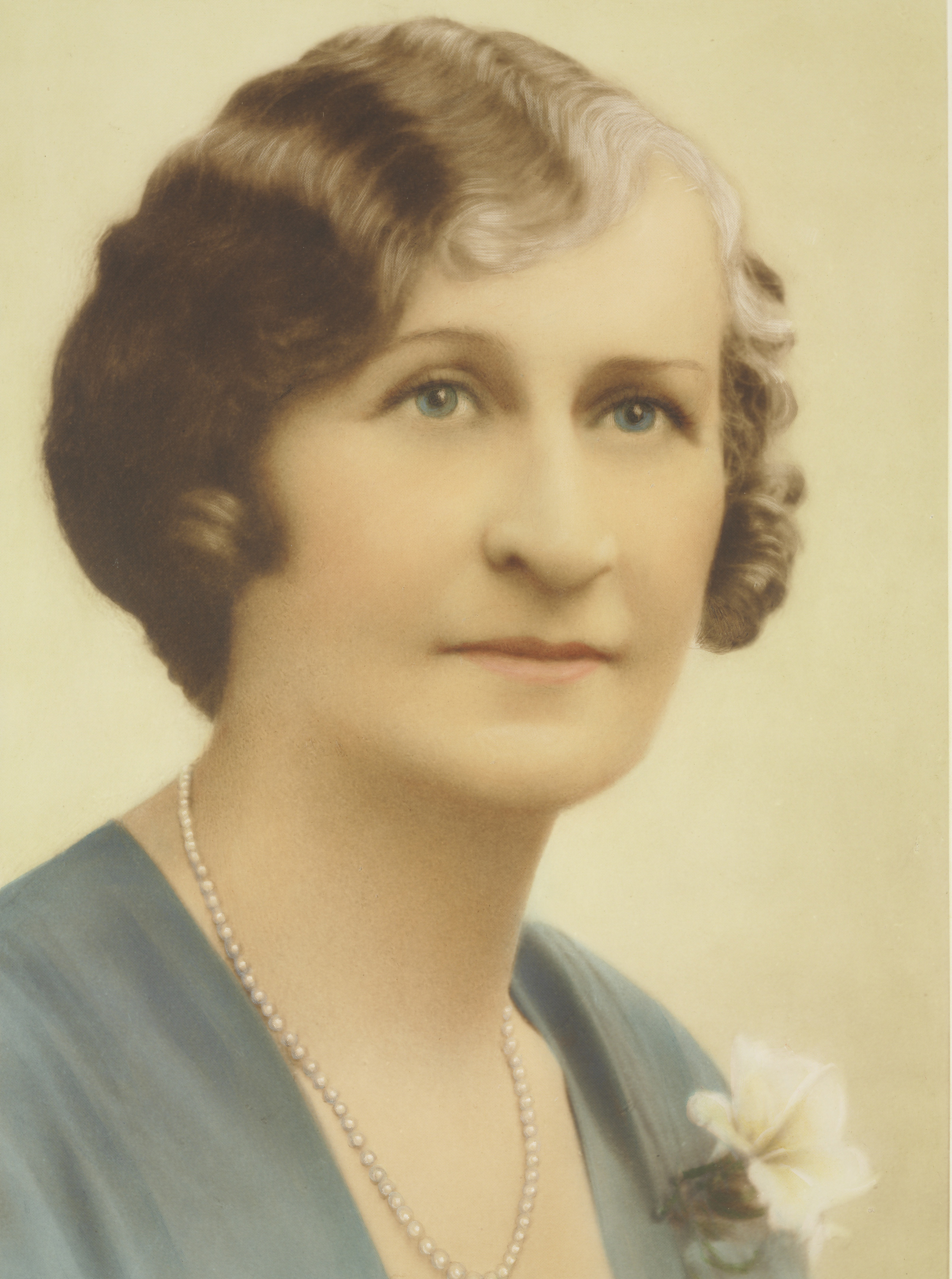
- Grace Emily Munro, founder of Country Women's Association of Australia, 10 April 1922.
- Born: Grace Emily Gordon; 25 March 1879; Warialda, New South Wales, Australia
- Died: 23 July 1964 (aged 85); Sydney, New South Wales, Australia
- Occupation: Charity worker
- Notable work: Founder of the Country Women's Association

Grace Emily Munro (née Gordon, 25 March 1879 – 23 July 1964) was an Australian World War One volunteer, charity worker, and founder of the Country Women's Association.

== Early life ==
Grace Emily Gordon was born on 25 March 1879 in Warialda, New South Wales, Australia, as the second of George Hollinworth Gordon's seven daughters. She received her education from a governess at Kambala, Sydney. Grace was an accomplished horsewoman, an exceptional needlewoman, and a knowledgeable gardener.

== World War One ==
Living mostly in Bellevue Hill during World War One, Munro held the position of Honorary Organizing Secretary of the Australian Army Medical Corps and worked for the Australian Red Cross Society. During the war, she became qualified in first aid, home nursing, and hygiene at St. John Ambulance Association under the training of Sister A. B. Perry. Munro helped organise facilities at the Sydney Showground for country volunteers and ran the post office there. She was also responsible for transporting the weekly supplies to army camps around Liverpool.

== Country Women's Association ==
In 1922, Munro held the first Country Women's Association (CWA) conference over three days during the Sydney Royal Easter Show and was subsequently elected as its president. She travelled throughout New South Wales and Queensland to help form branches of the association. By 1923, sixty-eight branches, seventeen restrooms for mothers and children, two seaside homes, and maternity centres in many towns had been established. She helped found a rest-room in Bingara in 1924 as well as the first country baby health centre in Moree. By 1926, when she retired due to illness, there were 100 CWA branches with a membership of 4,500.

== Other charitable works ==
Munro gave first aid classes after the war and was appointed a serving sister of the Order of St John of Jerusalem. In 1938, she was a member of the advisory board of New England University College at Armidale. She also became a member of Bingara Hospital Board and was the first woman to serve on a hospital board in rural NSW. Munro raised large sums of money for rest centres and holiday homes, which include the Australian Inland Mission's Aerial Medical Service, and the Red Cross and St John. Munro met with cabinet ministers to establish maternity wards in country hospitals and improved conditions in trains with railway refreshments rooms for women and children.

== Personal life ==
On 14 July 1898, Grace married 36-year-old Hugh Robert Munro of Keera station and they had three children together. Her youngest child died in 1911 while Grace was away in Sydney with another child who was having an emergency appendectomy. Because of this experience, Munro became determined to improve the conditions of and the availability of medical help for all women and children in the country.

Between 1911 and 1914 she travelled to cope with the loss of her child. She stayed with Hubert Murray in Papua New Guinea and sailed with him on his yacht to the Trobriand Islands and Fly River. She visited Tonga, Samoa, Fiji, Egypt, Europe, Kashmir, India, Burma, China, Japan, the Philippines, the Dutch East Indies, North America, South Africa, and the UK.

In 1928, she accompanied Brigadier General E A Wilson on his annual trip to Papua New Guinea's Sepik River. From 1952 onward, she made annual trips to the Great Barrier Reef and developed a large shell collection. In 1935, Munro received an O.B.E. The following year, she moved out of Keera and started developing properties in Scone and Bundara, and houses in Sydney's Eastern Suburbs.

Munro died in Sydney on 23 July 1964, aged 85, after suffering from a severe curvature of the spine. Her ashes were scattered over Keera.

== Commemoration ==
In November 2023 it was announced that Munro was one of eight women chosen to be commemorated in the second round of blue plaques sponsored by the Government of New South Wales alongside Kathleen Butler, godmother of Sydney Harbour Bridge; Emma Jane Callaghan, an Aboriginal midwife and activist; Susan Katherina Schardt; journalist Dorothy Drain; Pearl Mary Gibbs, an Aboriginal rights movement activist; and writer Charmian Clift.
