= Barraba Shire =

Former local government area in New South Wales, Australia

Coordinates: 30.395°S 150.568°E

Barraba Shire New South Wales
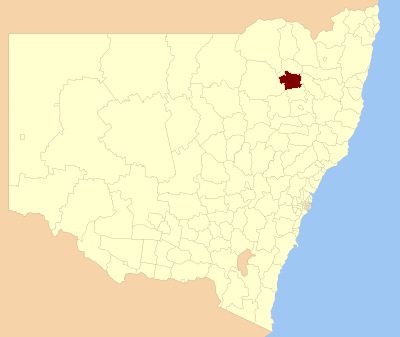
- Location within New South Wales
- Population: 2,185 (2004)
  - Density: 0.71203/km^{2} (1.8441/sq mi)
- Established: 1906
- Area: 3,068.7 km^{2} (1,184.8 sq mi)
- Council seat: Barraba
- Region: New England
LGAs around Barraba Shire:
Bingara	Bingara	Uralla
Narrabri	Barraba Shire	Uralla
Gunnedah	Manilla	Manilla

Barraba Shire was a local government area located in the New England region of New South Wales, Australia, about 90 kilometres (56 mi) north of Tamworth via Fossickers Way. The Shire, administered from the town of Barraba covered an area of 3,068.7 square kilometres (1,184.8 sq mi), and existed as a local government entity from 1906 until 2004, when it was split between two new LGAs, Gwydir Shire and Tamworth Regional Council.

== History ==
In 1897, a progress association was brought into being by local residents to advocate for the area and to manage infrastructure. With the passage of the Local Government Act 1906, which established shires all over New South Wales, the Barraba Shire was gazetted on 6 March 1906. As the town met the requirements for municipality status, it was separately gazetted as the Barraba Municipality on 19 May 1906. S. J. Lillis was elected the municipality's first mayor, while John Morrow became the first Barraba Shire president.

On 1 November 1953, the Barraba Municipality was abolished and the town came under the Shire's authority.

On 17 March 2004, Barraba Shire was abolished. 1,259.1 square kilometres (486.1 sq mi) (41%) of its area and 340 people in the Shire's north were transferred to the new Gwydir Shire, composed otherwise of the former Yallaroi and Bingara Shires. The rest, including the town of Barraba, was transferred to the new Tamworth Regional Council, formed from the former City of Tamworth and the Shires of Manilla, Nundle and most of Parry.

== Towns ==
- Barraba
- Banoon
- Cobbadah †
- Gulf Creek †
- Gundamulda †
- Ironbark
- Lindesay †
- Longarm
- Mayvale
- Red Hill
- Upper Horton †
- Woodsreef

† Transferred to Gwydir upon abolition.

== Population ==
Year	Population
1933	3,550
1947	3,088
1954	3,234
1961	2,952
1966	2,815
1971	3,035
1976	3,246
1981	2,933
1986	2,687
1991	2,467
1996	2,264
2001	2,136
