= Myall Creek Massacre and Memorial Site =

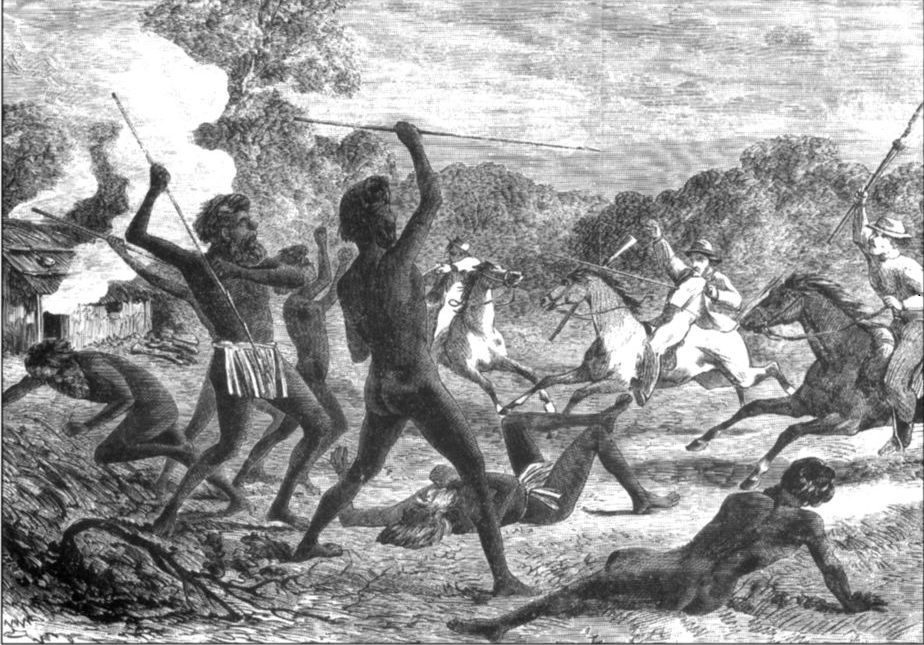
- Sketch of "Aboriginals fighting against the Europeans invading their natural homes", by Samuel Calvert

- Location within New South Wales Location within Australia
- 29.7792°S 150.7145°E
- Location: Bingara Delungra Road, Myall Creek via Bingara, Gwydir Shire, New South Wales, Australia

History
- Built: 1838–

Site notes
- Owner: Gwydir Shire Council; Land and Property Management Authority (LPMA)

New South Wales Heritage Register
- Official name: Myall Creek Massacre and Memorial Site; Myall Creek Massacre Area
- Type: state heritage (landscape)
- Designated: 12 November 2010
- Reference no.: 1844
- Type: Historic site
- Category: Aboriginal

Myall Creek Massacre and Memorial Site is the heritage-listed site of and memorial for the victims of the Myall Creek massacre at Bingara Delungra Road, Myall Creek, Gwydir Shire, New South Wales, Australia. The memorial, which was unveiled in 2000, was added to the Australian National Heritage List on 7 June 2008 and the New South Wales State Heritage Register on 12 November 2010.

== History ==
In the half century following the arrival of the First Fleet in 1788, a pattern of relations developed between Aboriginal people and European settlers that lasted into the 1900s. While the British Colonial Office instructed Arthur Phillip, the first Governor, to treat the Aboriginal population with goodwill and kindness, competition for resources and land following the expansion of European settlement invariably resulted in frontier conflict. Frontier violence posed a problem for the British administration because Aboriginal people and settlers were legally British subjects with the same rights and protection. Lack of resources and pressure from settlers however, made it increasingly difficult for the Administration to ensure the application of the rule of law.

The Myall Creek massacre in 1838, the subsequent court case and the hanging of seven settlers for the massacre of Aboriginal people, is pivotal in the development of the relationship between settlers and Aboriginal people. It is the first and last time that settlers were found guilty of, and hanged for, the killing of Aboriginal people on the frontier. It is the last time the Colonial Administration intervened to ensure the laws of the colony were applied equally to Aboriginal people and settlers involved in frontier killings. However, instead of setting a precedent that Aboriginal people could be protected under the law, Ryan (1980:20) states: the Myall Creek massacre and the ensuing cases had intensified the squatter's determination to have unfettered occupation of pastoral land. They were not prepared to wait while protectors rounded up the Aborigines, nor were they prepared to allow their stockkeepers to endure the full force of the law...for 1838 was the year that saw the final loss of control by government of pastoral expansion.

Colonial Administration's Response to Frontier Conflict

Aboriginal attacks on unarmed convicts were commonplace following the establishment of the settlement at Port Jackson in 1788. While some members of the Administration felt that the Aboriginal inhabitants of the area should be driven away and kept away by the judicious use of muskets, Governor Phillip attempted to establish friendly relations and trade. As a result of this policy, Phillip did not respond aggressively to the spearing of convicts by Aboriginal people. However, following the spearing and death of one of his servants in 1790, he authorised a punitive expedition against the "Botany Bay" tribe. He ordered the expedition to bring back two Aboriginal men to be hanged and the heads of a further ten Aboriginal men but it returned empty handed. Phillip never ordered another punitive expedition.

Phillip appears to have generally adopted a non-hostile approach to dealing with Aboriginal attacks. Conversely he ordered the flogging of settlers who took Aboriginal spears and nets or damaged Aboriginal canoes. Although Aboriginal witnesses to the floggings were horrified, Phillip used the floggings to demonstrate that settlers guilty of offences against Aboriginal people would be punished. In some cases he also provided compensation to Aboriginal people for their loss. However, following his departure in December 1792 all accommodation ended and the British Administration adopted a simpler solution: the unequal application of the law for settlers and Aboriginal people.

With the expansion of European settlement into the Hawkesbury and Hunter regions, frontier conflict intensified. This conflict was the result of competition for land which settlers required for crops and the grazing of sheep and cattle. Aboriginal people relied upon the same land for food and water. The initial response by the Administration was to dispatch troops to police the frontier, but the expanding area of land to be covered made this an increasingly difficult task. A lawless frontier environment soon existed where it was impossible to control the conflict between settlers and Aboriginal people. In response to this challenge the Administration ordered settlers to defend themselves and ordered Aboriginal people to stay away from European habitation. There is no evidence that Aboriginal people understood and agreed with these orders to stay away from European settlement as the conflict on the frontier continued.

Despite this, successive Governors in New South Wales adopted similar approaches to addressing frontier conflict. In 1796 Governor Hunter ordered settlers to "mutually afford their assistance to each other by assembling when ever any numerous bodies of natives are known to be lurking about the farms". By 1801 Governor King's orders were even more specific stating that the blacks were to "be driven back from settlers" habitations by firing at them'. In 1816 Governor Macquarie issued a proclamation stating that "No Aboriginal person is to appear armed within a mile of any settlement and no more than six Aboriginal people are allowed to lurk or loiter near farms".

During the 1830s individual colonies around Australia started to develop distinctive approaches to dealing with the issue of frontier violence. All of these approaches focused on removing Aboriginal people from the areas settled by Europeans. In New South Wales the practice of sending troops to suppress Aboriginal violence, often aided by settlers continued. This was evident in the Liverpool Plains district (the north-west frontier) following its initial settlement by Europeans in the late 1820s.

North-West Frontier in the 1820s and 1830s

Settlers from the Hunter Valley and Mudgee, in need of more pasture for their rapidly increasing flocks of sheep and herds of cattle, began arriving on the Liverpool Plains in c. 1826. At this time there were an estimated 12,000 Aboriginal people living in the district, mostly belonging to the Gamilaroi (also spelt Kamilaroi) language group but including other Aboriginal groups. The Gamilaroi people appear, from the very beginning, to have resisted European settlement. Surveyor William Gardner recorded how shortly after stations were formed on the Namoi River, local Aboriginal groups issued a formal challenge to the settlers to do battle. The stockmen however, refused to leave their barricaded hut. The war party responded by attacking the hut and attempted to remove the roof. The warriors were forced to retreat after numerous members of the party were killed by the sixteen heavily armed stockmen. The stockmen then followed the retreating party on horseback and "taught them they knew how to fight".

By 1837 settlers had pushed beyond the Peel and Namoi Rivers and taken up large tracts of land along the Gwydir or the "Big River" as it was then known. Local Gamilaroi groups resisted the alienation of their traditional lands almost immediately. The dispersed nature of the settlers stations enabled the Gamilaroi to easily isolate and attack stockmen and their livestock. In April 1836 two stockmen working for the Hall Brothers, were killed while forming a new station. In September and November of the following year two hutkeepers and two shepherds from the Bowman and Cobb stations were killed. Crown Land Commissioner Alexander Paterson reported back to Sydney in the second half of 1837 that stockmen on the Loder station, which was the westernmost station on the Namoi, were so afraid of raids by the Gamilaroi that they had abandoned their livestock to roam unattended in the bush.

Liverpool Plains settlers demanded military protection against Aboriginal attacks. In response to their demands, Lieutenant-Colonel Kenneth Snodgrass, Acting Governor of New South Wales sent a large Mounted Police party north to enquire into and repress the aggressions complained of. The Mounted Police party, led by Major Nunn and composed of around twenty troopers reached Liverpool Plains in January 1838. What occurred after they arrived remains unclear, but at Waterloo Creek, 50 kilometres southwest of what is now Moree, the Mounted Police encountered a large party of Aboriginal people camped alongside the Creek. In the ensuing melee a number of Aboriginal people were shot. The exact number of Aboriginal people killed in the melee is unknown but local squatters who visited site later, reported the number killed to be sixty or seventy. An eyewitness to the encounter testified that forty to fifty may have been killed. Rev Threlkeld in his mission report for 1838 stated that the number may have been as high as two or three hundred.

According to R. H. W. Reece in his book "Aborigines and Colonists," local tradition states that Nunn's party of Mounted Police was involved in at least one more large melee with local Aboriginal people before the party left the Plains. Major Nunn's Campaign (as it was known in the district) did not prevent further racial conflict. In March of that year two men working for Surveyor Finch were killed in the neighbouring district of New England, then in April a hutkeeper on the Gwydir was killed. In the following months stockmen from stations along the Gwydir River organised themselves into armed groups and scoured the country side in what is described by Reece as "a concerted campaign to get rid of all the Aborigines in the district." According to Reece this still known in local tradition as "The Bushwhack" or "The Drive". The Myall Creek Massacre took place in June of that year, on Myall Creek Station near the Gwydir River.

The Myall Creek Massacre

The escalating conflict between settlers and Aboriginal people on the frontier was one of the issues confronting Governor Gipps on his arrival in the New South Wales colony in 1838. Governor Gipps and the Colonial Secretary Lord Glenelg agreed that an important measure to prevent frontier conflict was to impress Aboriginal people with "the conviction that the laws of the colony will be equally administered for their protection from wrong and injury as for that of European settlers". The Myall Creek massacre provided Governor Gipps with an opportunity to demonstrate that the law could protect Aboriginal people through its equal application. When news of the incident was reported to him, Governor Gipps did not hesitate to order the perpetrators be brought to justice.

Once Governor Gipps was informed he gave instructions that Police Magistrate Day should proceed immediately to the scene of the tragedy with a party of mounted police to seek out the murderers. Day conducted a thorough investigation and apprehended eleven of twelve suspected Myall Creek murderers. The eleven men were arrested and tried for the murder of Daddy and an unknown Aboriginal

The twelve men responsible for the massacre included freed convicts and assigned convicts, led by John Fleming, the manager of the Mungie Bundie Station. The original party assembled at Bengari on a station owned by Archibald Bell before they set off and were joined by the remaining members somewhere along the Gwydir River. After spending the day unsuccessfully pursuing Aborigines the group came to the Myall Creek Station. They discovered approximately 30 Aborigines belonging to the Gamilaroi and Wirrayaraay peoples on the station, rounded them up and tied them together. When the station hand, George Anderson asked what they intended to do with the Aborigines he was told they were taking them over the back of the range to frighten them. A few minutes later the Gamilaroi and Wirrayaraay were led off and massacred. Two days later the men returned to burn the bodies. The impact of the massacre on the Gamilaroi and Wirrayaraay peoples was devastating. As one of the descendants whose great-great-great-grandfather survived the massacre states 'We didn't want to talk about it because of how dreadful it was I remember when we used to drive past that place. It just had a feeling about it that I can't explain'.

The Myall Creek massacre was marked by the unusual circumstance that one of the station hands who did not participate in the massacre, George Anderson, informed the station manager, William Hobbs, who reported the incident to the local magistrate. The reports by Anderson and Hobbs were not without danger, as the inquiry of magistrate Edward Day noted "[I] took George Anderson with [me], believing that [his] life would be in danger if he remained at Myall Creek".

In response to the charging of the eleven suspects settlers formed groups such as the "Black Association" to support the men charged with the murder. Papers such as the Sydney Herald protested against the trials. Charging the perpetrators of the massacre also stimulated the activism of religious and humanitarian groups who called for the execution of the perpetrators. These views were promoted through papers such as the Sydney Monitor and the Australian.

Upon being found not guilty, seven of the men were re-arrested and tried for the murder of an Aboriginal male named Charley. The second trial resulted in a guilty verdict and all seven men were sentenced to death. Governor Gipps later wrote that none of the seven attempted to deny their crime, though all stated they thought it extremely hard that white men should be put to death for killing blacks. On 18 December 1838, after all legal objections were exhausted and the Executive Council rejected petitions for clemency, the sentences were carried out.

John Plunkett, an Irish barrister, prosecuted in the two trials of the killers. Plunkett came to NSW in 1832 to take up the post of Solicitor-General. As a Catholic, he only became eligible for such an appointment in 1829 when the British Parliament removed most of the restrictions on members of that faith holding public office. In 1836 he became the colony's first Attorney-General but continued to carry out the duties of both positions. The colony was divided, often acrimoniously, between three groups - convicts, those who had been convicts but were now emancipated, and those who thought themselves superior because they had never been either. One of the most powerful sections of the community were the squatters, who had established large pastoral holdings in the north of the colony, one result of which was the complete disruption of local Aboriginal communities.

When the trial of the stockmen commenced, they had expensive defence counsel paid for by the local landowners from the Myall Creek area. The workings of criminal law in 1838 meant there could only be one victim in relation to any particular trial for murder, no matter how many accused had been charged. This presented problems of identification for the prosecution, particularly because one witness saw the Aborigines being led away and a different witness saw their largely burnt bodies. Plunkett was the subject of considerable public criticism for initiating the prosecution and the first trial resulted in not guilty verdicts. But this was where the one-victim rule played into Plunkett's hands. He chose a different victim for a second trial of seven of the stockmen, who again made no statements on their own behalf. This time the verdict was guilty, and, after an appeal was dismissed, all seven were hanged, despite public petitions and violent editorials demanding that the sentences be commuted. It is something of an irony that Plunkett himself was opposed to capital punishment.

Aftermath of the Trial

The hanging of the seven stockmen in 1838 for their part in the Myall Creek massacre caused controversy throughout the colony. It led to heightened racial tensions and hardened attitudes towards Aboriginal people. This was evident on the day of the execution when the Australian published a letter which said, "I look on the blacks as a set of monkies, and the earlier they are exterminated from the face of the earth the better. I would never consent to hang a white man for a black one" (The Australian, 18 December 1838).

While this was not the first time settlers were hanged for murdering Aborigines (see R v Ridgway, Chip, Colthurst and Stanley 1826, R v Kirby & Thompson 1820) it was the first time that settlers were found guilty of, and hanged for, the killing of Aboriginal people on the frontier. It is also the last time the Colonial Administration intervened to ensure the laws of the colony were applied equally to Aboriginal people and settlers involved in frontier killings.

Governor Gipps' public resolve to treat Aboriginal people equally never diminished, however the public response to the Myall Creek trial influenced his future decisions. The failure to re-try the remaining four men accused in the Myall Creek massacre and the continuing delays to the enquiry of Major Nunn's campaign highlight this. Governor Gipps indicates that one of the reasons for the delay into the enquiry was the settlers "very excited state in respect to the blacks" after the execution of seven men for their part in the Myall Creek massacre. Governor Gipps also was concerned that any action taken against Major Nunn would result in the military quitting their positions, leaving the frontier severely weakened.

Despite the guilty verdicts and the hanging of seven men that followed the Myall Creek trials, frontier violence between settlers and Aboriginal people did not diminish. Although the police and Aboriginal protectors investigated the frequent reports of violence towards Aboriginal people, settlers were rarely arrested and when they were, juries generally found them innocent of any crime. On the rare occasion when a settler was convicted for the murder of Aboriginal person, their sentence would generally be reduced.

Legacy and Reconciliation

The Myall Creek massacre was a landmark event because retelling the story continued to remind Australians about the mistreatment of Aboriginal people during the period of frontier conflict. During the 1800s several popular poems were written about the massacre including "Incantation Scene", "Weird Sisters" and "The Aboriginal Mother", the latter written by poet Eliza Dunlop was subsequently set to music. The events were also recounted in texts published in Australia and overseas. From 1920 to 1950 the Myall Creek massacre was less frequently discussed in texts although it did receive some attention.

In the early 1970s, the historian Charles Rowley described the Myall Creek massacre as one of Australia's horror stories that has "given us such as racist image overseas" and must be told if Australians are "to understand the real nature of the Aboriginal problem [and] the brutalizing forces that brought it into being". It was around this time that stories of the Myall Creek massacre returned to prominence in texts on Australian history to illustrate the conflict between Indigenous people and settlers on the frontier. The Myall Creek massacre was also included in specialised text on Indigenous history and frontier conflict to describe race relations in Australia and the way the Colonial Administration dealt with Indigenous issues. In the 1990s the New South Wales Board of Education included the Myall Creek massacre in its "Discovering Democracy Unit" which formed part of the curriculum for civics and citizenship education.

As well as playing an important role in educating people about Australian Indigenous history, the Myall Creek massacre also became part of Australia's reconciliation movement. In 1998 the Uniting Church in Australia held a conference on reconciliation at Myall Creek, which lead to the establishment of a Myall Creek Memorial Committee. This committee is made up of descendants of the Aboriginal people who survived the Myall Creek massacre, concerned locals and participants of the conference. One of the aims of this committee was to establish a memorial in recognition of the Myall Creek massacre. Lyall Munro Snr, a descendant of victims of the massacre, worked long and hard towards getting a memorial erected to mark the event.

In June 2000, after several years of work, the Committee opened the Myall Creek Memorial "in an act of reconciliation and in acknowledgement of the truth of our shared history". This memorial has brought together the descendants of the victims, survivors and perpetrators and each year a commemoration ceremony is held at the site. A Sydney Friends of Myall Creek has also been established to promote the significance of this site for all Australians. In recognition of the role that the memorial has played as a place of reconciliation, the Myall Creek memorial is a winner of the Australians for Native Title and Reconciliation's Judith Wright Reconciliation Prize.

A memorial service was held for the 170th anniversary of the massacre in 2008. This was attended by Federal Minister for Heritage, The Hon. Peter Garrett who announced the inclusion of the site on the National Heritage List (Australia's Living Heritage 1(3), Summer 2008–9, 8–9).

Each year on the June long weekend over 400 people from around Australia gather at the memorial to commemorate the massacre of 1838.

== Description ==
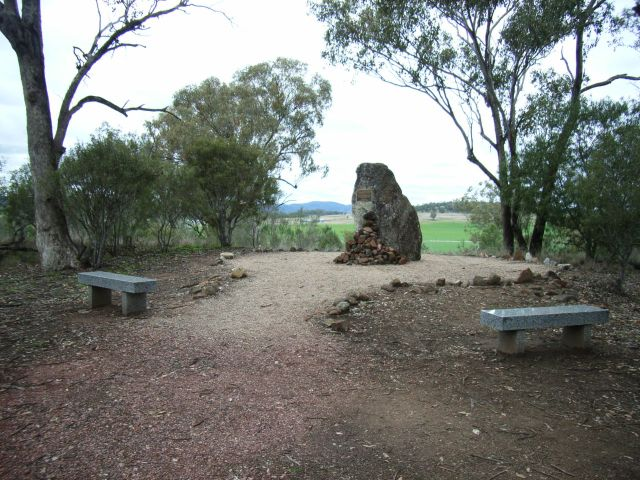
At the end of the walkway is the memorial set on a rise overlooking the site of the massacre

The Myall Creek massacre and memorial site is located on gently rolling slopes and small hills which have mostly been cleared and improved for grazing sheep and cattle. The area supports dry sclerophyll woodland species such as the White Box, Bimble Box, Red Gum, Scribbly Gum and various Ironbarks. The land is part of a Travelling Stock Route used by cattle to access the creek.

Two basalt blocks mark the beginning of the memorial walkway which is a 600-metre winding path in red gravel that leads through woodland and grasses. At various stages along the walkway there are seven oval shaped granite boulders which contain plaques with etchings and words in English and Gamilaroi. These plaques tell the story of the Myall Creek massacre. At the end of the walkway the memorial is set on a rise overlooking the site of the massacre between five spreading gumtrees. The memorial rock is a 14 tonne granite boulder with a simple plaque surrounded by a circle of crushed white granite, edged in by stones from all around the state of New South Wales.

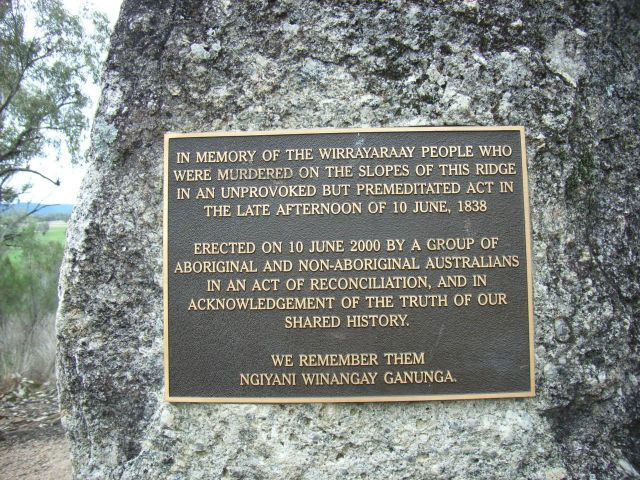
Bronze plaque commemorating the massacre

The Bronze Plaque on the memorial states:

In memory of the Wirrayaraay people who were murdered on the slopes of this ridge in an unprovoked but premeditated act in the late afternoon of 10 June 1838. Erected on 10 June 2000 by a group of Aboriginal and non-Aboriginal Australians in an act of reconciliation, and in acknowledgment of the truth of our shared history. We Remember them (Ngiyani winangay ganunga).

The area is mainly woodland with the Myall Creek Memorial being constructed of fire resistant granite and metal alloys.

The Myall Creek Memorial was opened in 2000. The memorial is managed by the Gwydir Shire Council and the Myall Creek Memorial Committee.

The memorial was vandalised in January 2005, with the words "murder", "women" and "children" chiselled off, in an attempt to make it unreadable.

The site was again reported as vandalised in September 2021. There was damage to buildings, sandstone steps and railings. A memorial plaque was also vandalised, but the committee was unsure if this was done by the same perpetrators. Co-chair of the national Friends of Myall Creek committee, Keith Munro, confirmed a racist slogan was also scratched into the ground.

== Heritage listing ==
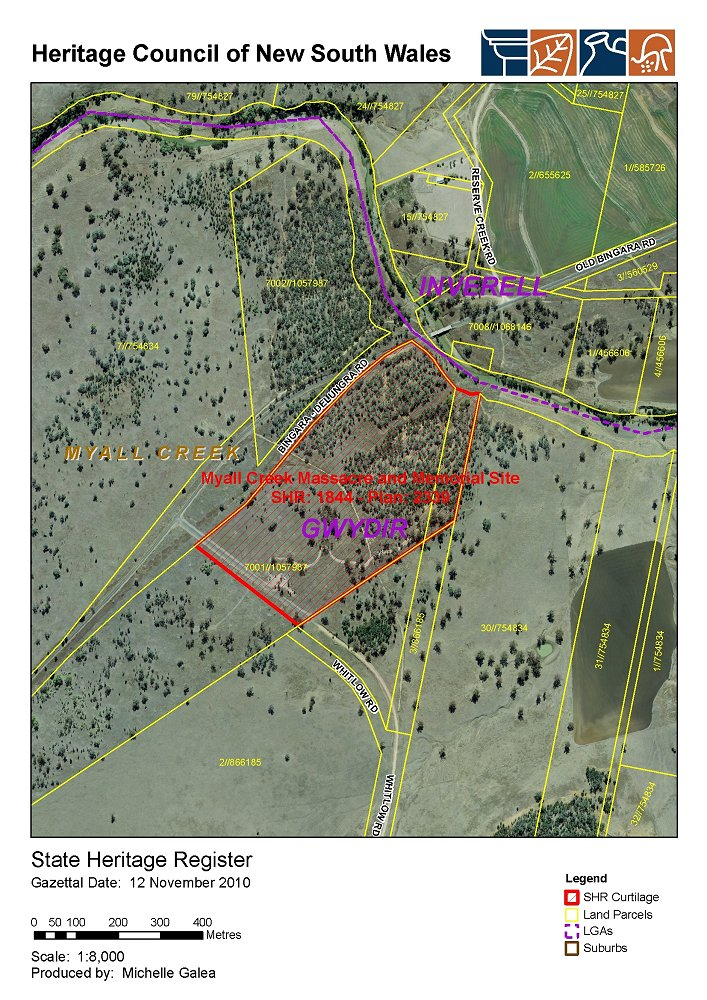
Heritage boundaries

The brutal massacre at Myall Creek of around 30 men, women and children of the Wirrayaraay and Gamilaroi peoples in June 1838, the subsequent court cases and the hanging of the seven settlers for their role in the massacre, was pivotal in the development of the relationship between settlers and Aboriginal people in NSW. It was the last attempt by the Colonial Administration to use the law to control frontier conflict between settlers and Aboriginal people. Instead of setting a precedent that Aboriginal people could be protected under the law, it hardened settlers' resolve to use whatever means were available to clear Aboriginal people from the land on the frontier.

The massacre at Myall Creek is a relatively rare instance in NSW, where the massacre of Aboriginal people (as a result of frontier violence) is well documented, and broadly speaking the massacre is representative of the violent conflict that took place in frontier areas between Aboriginal people and settlers. The massacre at Myall Creek is also a landmark event because accounts of the massacre, written from the 1850s to the present, have continued to remind Australians about the mistreatment of Aboriginal people during the period of frontier conflict.

The Myall Creek Massacre and Memorial Site is of high significance to the Wirrayaraay of Gamilaroi people, as the site of the brutal murder of their ancestors and for its ability to demonstrate the Wirrayaraay and Gamilaroi peoples experience of colonisation. The importance of site to the Wirrayaraay people is evidenced by their participation in the campaign to establish a memorial on the site of the massacre, and their continuing involvement in the management of site. Descendants of Aboriginal people who survived the massacre form part of the Myall Creek Memorial Committee, which co-manages the site.

The Myall Creek Massacre and Memorial Site is important to the local community as a symbol of reconciliation and a place of education. District schools and representatives of all the Shires in the region participate in the annual service held at the site. The Myall Creek Memorial is also a place of reconciliation for the descendants of both Aboriginal and non-Aboriginal people involved in Myall Creek massacre. In recognition of the role that the memorial has played as a place of reconciliation, the Myall Creek Memorial was the winner of the Australians for Native Title and Reconciliation's Judith Wright Reconciliation Prize, in 2003.

Myall Creek Massacre and Memorial Site was listed on the New South Wales State Heritage Register on 12 November 2010 having satisfied the following criteria.

The place is important in demonstrating the course, or pattern, of cultural or natural history in New South Wales.

The Myall Creek Massacre, the subsequent court cases and the hanging of seven settlers, played a pivotal role in the development of the relationship between settlers and Aboriginal people. In the half century following British settlement, the Colonial Administration stated on numerous occasions that Aboriginal people and settlers were equal before the law. However, juries regularly found settlers accused on killing Aboriginal people on the frontier not guilty. The Myall Creek massacre is important in the course of New South Wales' history as it was the last time the Colonial Administration intervened to ensure the laws of the colony were applied equally to Aboriginal people and settlers involved in frontier killings. The massacre at Myall Creek is also a landmark event because accounts of the massacre, written from the 1850s to the present, have continued to remind Australians about the mistreatment of Aboriginal people during the period of frontier conflict.

The place has a strong or special association with a person, or group of persons, of importance of cultural or natural history of New South Wales's history.

The Myall Creek Massacre and Memorial Site is associated with the brutal massacre in June 1838 of a group of men, women and children of the Wirrayaraay and Gamilaroi peoples by settlers. A group of around 30 Aboriginal people were camped peacefully on Myall Creek Station when twelve stockmen rode on to the station, rounded them up and tied them together, before leading them off to be massacred.

The place has strong or special association with a particular community or cultural group in New South Wales for social, cultural or spiritual reasons.

The Myall Creek Massacre and Memorial Site is of high significance to the Wirrayaraay of Gamilaroi people, as the site of the brutal murder of their ancestors and for its ability to demonstrate the Wirrayaraay and Gamilaroi peoples experience of colonisation. The importance of site to the Wirrayaraay people is evidenced by their participation in the campaign to establish a memorial on the site of the massacre, and their continuing involvement in the management of site. Descendants of Aboriginal people who survived the massacre form part of the Myall Creek Memorial Committee, which co-manages the site.

The Myall Creek Massacre and Memorial Site is important to the local community as a symbol of reconciliation and a place of education. District schools and representatives of all the Shires in the region participate in the annual service held at the site. The Myall Creek Memorial is also a place of reconciliation for the descendants of both Aboriginal and non-Aboriginal people involved in Myall Creek massacre. In recognition of the role that the memorial has played as a place of reconciliation, the Myall Creek Memorial was the winner of the Australians for Native Title and Reconciliation's Judith Wright Reconciliation Prize, in 2003.

The place possesses uncommon, rare or endangered aspects of the cultural or natural history of New South Wales.

The Myall Creek Massacre is a relatively rare instance in NSW where the massacre of Aboriginal people, as a result of frontier violence, is well documented. The substantial public record of the terrible events that took place at Myall Creek Station on the 10 June 1838 exists, largely because of the immediate reporting of the event, the investigation by officers of the law and the documentation of the event through the subsequent court cases.

The place is important in demonstrating the principal characteristics of a class of cultural or natural places/environments in New South Wales.

The expansion of pastoral frontiers in the Colony of New South Wales, was invariably accompanied by some degree of conflict between settlers and displaced Aboriginal peoples. During the years 1837 and 1846 the Colony experienced the worst racial clashes in its history. The massacre at Myall Creek is a well documented example of the mistreatment of Aboriginal people during this period.

== See also ==
- List of massacres in Australia
- List of massacres of Indigenous Australians
