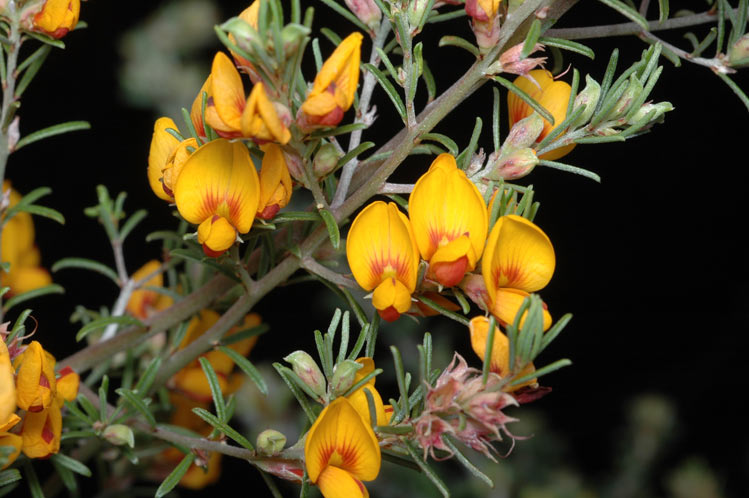
- In the Australian National Botanic Gardens

Scientific classification
- Kingdom: Plantae
- Clade: Tracheophytes
- Clade: Angiosperms
- Clade: Eudicots
- Clade: Rosids
- Order: Fabales
- Family: Fabaceae
- Subfamily: Faboideae
- Genus: Pultenaea
- Species: P. cinerascens

Binomial name
- Pultenaea cinerascens Maiden & Betche

= Pultenaea cinerascens =

Species of flowering plant

Pultenaea cinerascens is a species of flowering plant in the family Fabaceae and is endemic to central New South Wales. It is an erect to spreading shrub with narrow oblong to wedge-shaped leaves, and groups of yellow and red flowers.

== Description ==
Pultenaea cinerascens is an erect to spreading shrub with softly-hairy branches. The leaves are narrow oblong to wedge-shaped, 3–15 mm (0.12–0.59 in) long and 0.5–1.0 mm (0.020–0.039 in) wide with stipules 1–3 mm (0.039–0.118 in) long at the base and the edges rolled under. The flowers are arranged near the ends of the branchlets and are 7–12 mm (0.28–0.47 in) long on a pedicel 0.5–2 mm (0.020–0.079 in) long with hairy, linear bracteoles 1–3 mm (0.039–0.118 in) long at the base of the sepals. The sepals are 3–6 mm (0.12–0.24 in) long and hairy and the fruit is a flattened pod 6–7 mm (0.24–0.28 in) long.

== Taxonomy and naming ==
Pultenaea cinerascens was first formally described in 1905 by Joseph Maiden and Ernst Betche in the Proceedings of the Linnean Society of New South Wales from specimens collected near Warialda by John Luke Boorman in 1905. The specific epithet (cinerascens) means "becoming ash-grey".

== Distribution and habitat ==
This pultenaea grows in forest on sandstone between Coolatai and Parkes in central New South Wales.
