= Yallaroi Shire =

Former local government area in New South Wales, Australia

Coordinates: 29°17′06″S 150°24′50″E

- Local government area
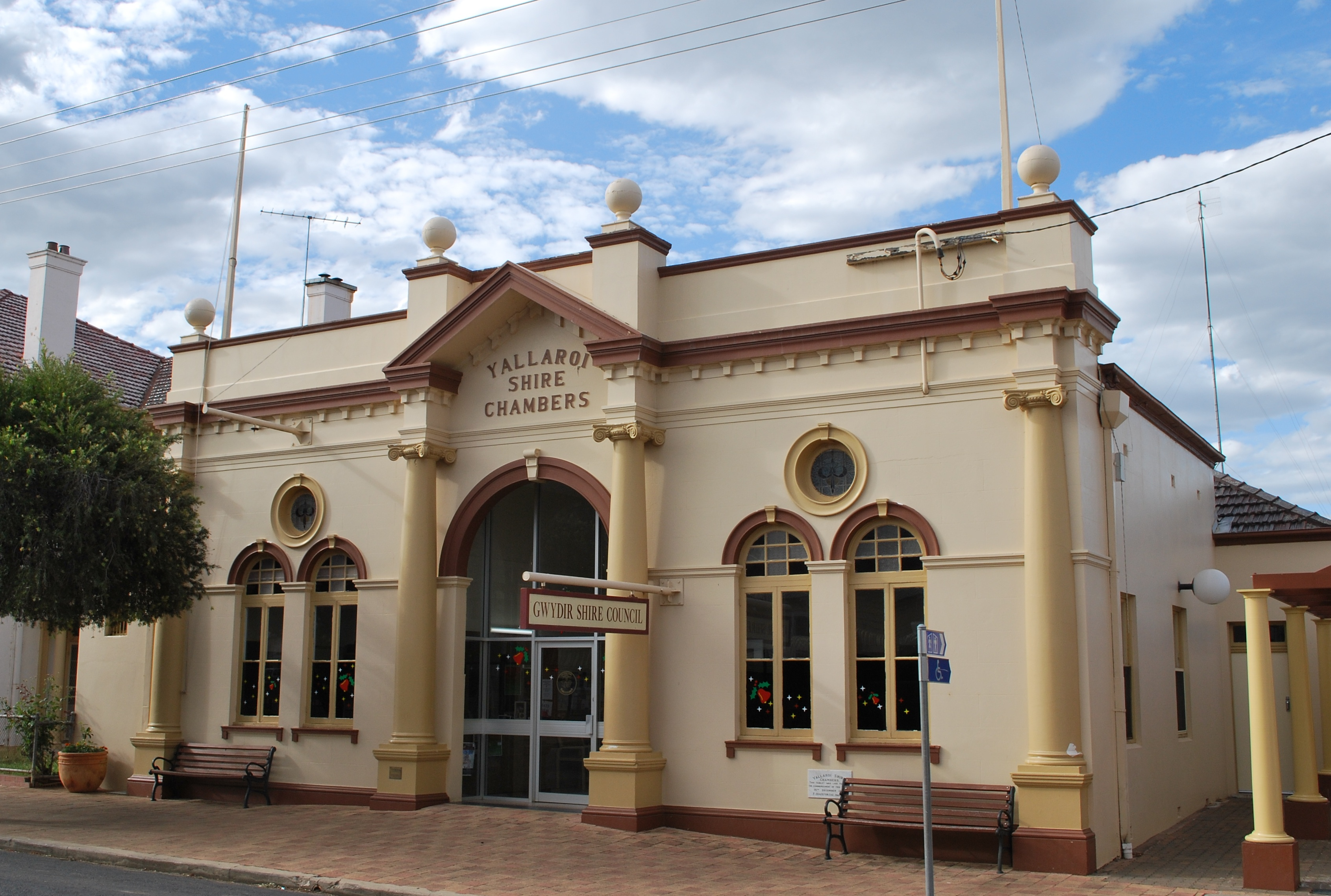
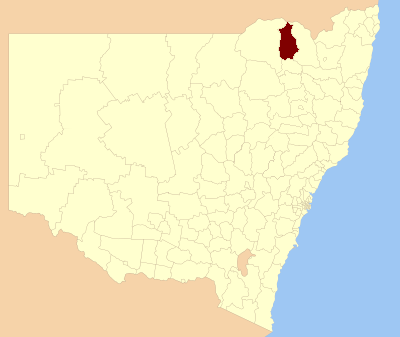
- Yallaroi Shire chambers, 2010 Location within New South Wales

- Country: Australia
- State: New South Wales
- Region: New England
- Established: 1906
- Abolished: 2004
- Council seat: Warialda

Area
  - Total: 5,340.1 km^{2} (2,061.8 sq mi)

Population
  - Total: 4,279 (2004)
  - Density: 0.80130/km^{2} (2.07535/sq mi)
LGAs around Yallaroi Shire
Moree Plains	Waggamba (Qld)	Inverell
Moree Plains	Yallaroi Shire	Inverell
Moree Plains	Bingara	Inverell

Yallaroi Shire was a local government area located in the New England region of New South Wales, Australia, about 100 kilometres (62 mi) south of Goondiwindi via Fossickers Way. The Shire, administered from the town of Warialda, covered an area of 5,340.1 square kilometres (2,061.8 sq mi), and existed as a local government entity from 1906 until 2004, when it was amalgamated with Bingara Shire and part of Barraba to form the Gwydir Shire.

== History ==
In August 1897, a public meeting was held in Warialda to consider "the desirableness of transferring the village into a municipality". The residents decided against the proposal at this time, but two years later, petitioned the Governor for a municipality with a population of more than 500 and an area of 6.25 square miles (16.2 km^{2}). The Warialda Municipality thus came into being on 30 March 1900. John Crane was elected its first mayor.

With the passage of the Local Government Act 1906, which established shires all over New South Wales, the Yallaroi Shire was gazetted to serve the surrounding district on 6 March 1906. On 29 December 1924, the Warialda municipality was absorbed into the shire.

On 17 March 2004, Yallaroi Shire was abolished and merged with the Bingara Shire and part of Barraba to form the Gwydir Shire.

== Towns ==
- Warialda
- Coolatai
- Copeton
- Crooble
- Croppa Creek
- Gravesend
- Mungle
- North Star
- Warialda Rail
- Yagobe
- Yallaroi

== Population ==
Year	Population
1921	3,228
1933	4,279
1947	3,669
1954	4,672
1961	4,588
1966	4,481
1971	4,302
1976	4,101
1981	3,947
1986	3,821
1991	3,540
1996	3,227
2001	3,124
