= Darling County =

Darling New South Wales
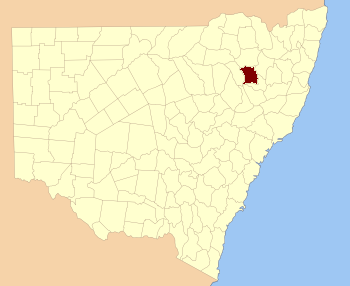
- Location in New South Wales
Lands administrative divisions around Darling:
Murchison	Murchison	Hardinge
Nandewar	Darling	Hardinge
Buckland	Parry	Inglis

Darling County is one of the 141 cadastral divisions of New South Wales. It includes Manilla and Barraba

Darling County was probably named after the seventh Governor of New South Wales Sir Ralph Darling (1775–1858).

== Parishes ==
A full list of parishes found within this county; their current LGA and mapping coordinates to the approximate centre of each location is as follows:

Parish	LGA	Coordinates
Alfred	Tamworth Regional Council	30°33′54″S 150°59′04″E
Baldwin	Tamworth Regional Council	30°51′54″S 150°34′04″E
Barraba	Tamworth Regional Council	30°24′54″S 150°34′04″E
Belmore	Tamworth Regional Council	30°23′54″S 150°29′04″E
Borah	Tamworth Regional Council	30°38′54″S 150°37′04″E
Borinde	Tamworth Regional Council	30°31′54″S 150°25′04″E
Cuerindi	Tamworth Regional Council	30°46′54″S 150°48′04″E
Darling	Tamworth Regional Council	30°20′54″S 150°55′04″E
Dinawirindi	Tamworth Regional Council	30°44′54″S 150°40′04″E
Dowe	Tamworth Regional Council	30°42′54″S 150°30′04″E
Eumur	Tamworth Regional Council	30°25′54″S 150°45′04″E
Fitzroy	Tamworth Regional Council	30°33′54″S 150°27′04″E
Fleming	Tamworth Regional Council	30°39′54″S 150°48′04″E
Gladstone	Tamworth Regional Council	30°29′54″S 150°37′04″E
Gulligal	Tamworth Regional Council	30°51′54″S 151°04′04″E
Hall	Tamworth Regional Council	30°45′54″S 150°58′04″E
Halloran	Tamworth Regional Council	30°47′54″S 150°54′04″E
Hobden	Tamworth Regional Council	30°33′54″S 150°30′04″E
Ironbark	Tamworth Regional Council	30°17′54″S 150°47′04″E
Keepit	Gunnedah Shire	30°53′54″S 150°30′04″E
Lowry	Tamworth Regional Council	30°36′54″S 150°52′04″E
Manilla	Tamworth Regional Council	30°49′54″S 150°43′04″E
Mundowey	Tamworth Regional Council	30°41′54″S 150°53′04″E
Namoi	Gunnedah Shire	30°49′54″S 150°29′04″E
Nandewar	Tamworth Regional Council	30°18′54″S 150°30′04″E
Nangahrah	Tamworth Regional Council	30°24′54″S 150°55′04″E
Newry	Tamworth Regional Council	30°29′54″S 150°36′04″E
North Barraba	Tamworth Regional Council	30°20′54″S 150°36′04″E
Rangiri	Tamworth Regional Council	30°36′54″S 150°30′04″E
Tarpoly	Tamworth Regional Council	30°34′54″S 150°38′04″E
Tiabundie	Tamworth Regional Council	30°21′54″S 150°38′04″E
Veness	Tamworth Regional Council	30°42′54″S 150°45′04″E
Warrabah	Tamworth Regional Council	30°27′54″S 151°00′04″E
Welsh	Tamworth Regional Council	30°29′54″S 150°50′04″E
Wilson	Tamworth Regional Council	30°35′54″S 150°43′04″E
Woodsreef	Tamworth Regional Council	30°24′54″S 150°47′04″E
