= Back Creek, New South Wales (Gwydir) =

Back Creek
- Suburb
- Coordinates: 30°7′42″S 150°16′11″E
- Country: Australia
- State: New South Wales
- Region: New England
- LGA: Gwydir Shire

Government
  - State electorate: Northern Tablelands
  - Federal division: New England

Population
  - Total: 20 (2021 census)
- Time zone: UTC+10 (AEST)
  - Summer (DST): UTC+11 (AEDT)
- Postcode: 2390

Back Creek is a small rural locality in the Gwydir Shire, part of the New England region of New South Wales, Australia.

At the 2021 census, the town recorded a population of 20.
