= Myall Creek, New South Wales =

Myall Creek New South Wales
- Coordinates: 29.7792°S 150.7145°E
- Population: 27 (2021 census)
- Postcode(s): 2403
- Location: 27.5 km (17 mi) ENE of Bingara; 115 km (71 mi) W of Glen Innes; 179 km (111 mi) N of Tamworth; 591 km (367 mi) N of Sydney
- LGA(s): Inverell Shire; Gwydir Shire
- State electorate(s): Northern Tablelands
- Federal division(s): New England
Suburbs around Myall Creek:
Gineroi	Delungra	Delungra
Bingara	Myall Creek	Gum Flat
Whitlow	Whitlow	Copeton

Myall Creek is a rural locality split between the local government areas of Inverell Shire and the Gwydir Shire in New South Wales, Australia. In the 2021 census, Myall Creek had a population of 27.

It is the site of the 1838 massacre of local Wirrayaraay people by whites. Afterwards, some of the offenders were prosecuted, convicted by a jury, and hanged. This is considered the first time that white settlers were prosecuted and executed for massacres against Aboriginal people.

== History ==
By 1837 European settlers had pushed beyond the Peel and Namoi rivers and taken up large tracts of land along the Gwydir River, or the "Big River" as it was then known. Local Gamilaroi groups almost immediately resisted the alienation of their traditional lands.

Because of the dispersed and isolated nature of the settlers stations, the Gamilaroi could easily attack stockmen and their livestock. In April 1836 two stockmen working for the Hall Brothers were killed while forming a new station. In September and November of the following year, two hutkeepers and two shepherds from the Bowman and Cobb stations were killed. Crown Land Commissioner Alexander Paterson reported to Sydney in the second half of 1837 that stockmen on the Loder station, which was the westernmost station on the Namoi, were so afraid of raids by the Gamilaroi that they had abandoned their livestock to roam unattended in the bush.

Liverpool Plains settlers demanded military protection against Aboriginal attacks. In response to their demands, Lieutenant-Colonel Kenneth Snodgrass, Acting Governor of New South Wales sent a large Mounted Police party north to investigate and repress such attacks. The Mounted Police party, led by Major Nunn and composed of around twenty troopers, reached Liverpool Plains in January 1838.

What occurred after they arrived remains unclear. At Waterloo Creek, 50 kilometres southwest of what is now Moree, the Mounted Police encountered a large party of Aboriginal people camped alongside the creek. In the ensuing melee they shot and killed a number of Aboriginal people in what became known as the Waterloo Creek massacre. The exact number of Aboriginal people killed in the melee is unknown. Local squatters who later visited the site, reported the number killed to be sixty or seventy. An eyewitness testified that forty to fifty may have been killed. Rev Threlkeld in his mission report for 1838 said that the number may have been as high as two or three hundred.

According to R. H. W. Reece in his book "Aborigines and Colonists" (1974), local tradition says that Nunn's party of Mounted Police was involved in at least one more large melee with local Aboriginal people before the party left the Plains. Major Nunn's Campaign (as it was known in the district) did not prevent further racial conflict. In March of that year two men working for Surveyor Finch were killed in the neighbouring district of New England; in April a hutkeeper on the Gwydir was killed. In the following months stockmen from stations along the Gwydir River organised into armed groups and scoured the country side in what is described by Reece as "a concerted campaign to get rid of all the Aborigines in the district." According to Reece, this was still known in local tradition as "The Bushwhack" or "The Drive". The Myall Creek Massacre took place in June 1838, on Myall Creek Station near the Gwydir River.

The twelve men responsible for the massacre included freed convicts and assigned convicts, led by John Henry Fleming, the only free man, manager of the Mungie Bundie Station. The original party assembled at Bengari on a station owned by Archibald Bell before they set off and were joined by the remaining members somewhere along the Gwydir River.

After spending the day unsuccessfully pursuing Aborigines, the group came to the Myall Creek Station. They discovered approximately 30 Aborigines belonging to the Gamilaroi and Wirrayaraay peoples on the station, rounded them up and tied them together. When the station hand, George Anderson, asked what they intended to do with the Aborigines, he was told they were taking them over the back of the range to frighten them. A few minutes later the group led away the Gamilaroi and Wirrayaraay and massacred them. Two days later the men returned to burn the bodies.

The effects of the massacre on the Gamilaroi and Wirrayaraay peoples was devastating. One descendant says that his great-great-great-grandfather survived the massacre, but his family never mentioned it. 'We didn't want to talk about it because of how dreadful it was I remember when we used to drive past that place. It just had a feeling about it that I can't explain'.

The Myall Creek massacre was marked by unusual circumstances. George Anderson, a station hand who did not participate in the massacre, told the station manager, William Hobbs, about it. (Hobbs had been away from the station.) He reported the incident to the local magistrate. Anderson and Hobbs risked their own safety in discussing the events. Magistrate Edward Day noted in his inquiry, "[I] took George Anderson with [me], believing that [his] life would be in danger if he remained at Myall Creek".

After eleven suspects were charged, some settlers formed groups such as the "Black Association" to support the defence of the men charged with the murder. Papers such as the Sydney Herald protested against the trials. When the suspects were charged, some religious and humanitarian groups called for the execution of the perpetrators. These views were promoted through papers such as the Sydney Monitor and the Australian.

A jury acquitted all the defendants. The Attorney General arrested seven of the men on additional charges, for the murder of an Aboriginal male named Charley. (There was insufficient evidence against the other four.) The jury found all seven men guilty, and they were sentenced to death. Governor George Gipps later wrote that none of the seven attempted to deny their crime, though all stated they thought it extremely hard that white men should be put to death for killing blacks. On 18 December 1838, after all legal objections were exhausted and the Executive Council rejected petitions for clemency, the sentences were carried out.

== Heritage listings ==
Myall Creek has a number of heritage-listed sites, including:

- Bingara Delungra Road: Myall Creek Massacre and Memorial Site
