= Copeton, New South Wales =

Copeton
- Suburb
- Interactive map of Copeton
- Coordinates: 29°53′07″S 150°55′56″E
- Country: Australia
- State: New South Wales
- Region: New England
- LGA: Gwydir Shire Inverell Shire

Government
  - State electorate: Northern Tablelands
  - Federal division: New England

Population
  - Total: 46 (2016 census)
- Time zone: UTC+10 (AEST)
  - Summer (DST): UTC+11 (AEDT)
- Postcode: 2404
- County: Hardinge
- Parish: Mayo

Copeton is a rural locality in the Gwydir Shire and Inverell Shire of New South Wales, Australia. There was once a mining village of the same name, originally called Boggy Camp. The locality is part forested and part cleared land, but a significant part of it is inundated by the waters of Lake Copeton, which formed following construction of Copeton Dam.

The mining village stood on the left bank of Copes Creek, where diamonds were mined. It had long become a ghost town by the time that its site was inundated by Lake Copeton. The village effectively ceased to exist officially with the resumption of its private landholdings, in 1971, and public lands, in 1972. The village's cemetery still exists and has been exposed at times when the water is at a low level.

There was a school in the locality from 1889 to 1965. Originally called Round Mountain, it was renamed Copeton in 1900.

At the 2016 census, the town recorded a population of 46.
