= Hardinge County =

Hardinge New South Wales
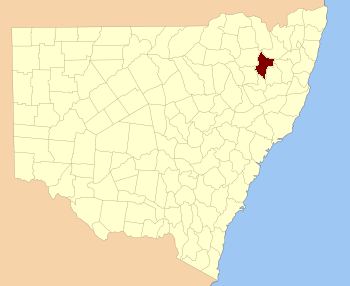
- Location in New South Wales
Lands administrative divisions around Hardinge:
Murchison	Arrawatta	Gough
Murchison	Hardinge	Clarke
Darling	Inglis	Sandon

Hardinge County is one of the 141 cadastral divisions of New South Wales.

Hardinge County was named in honour of Field Marshal, Sir Henry Hardinge (1785–1856).

== Parishes ==
A full list of parishes found within this county; their current LGA and mapping coordinates to the approximate centre of each location is as follows:

Parish	LGA	Coordinates
Abington	Uralla Shire	30°14′54″S 151°16′04″E
Aconite	Inverell Shire	29°52′54″S 150°56′04″E
Aston	Armidale Regional Council	29°59′54″S 151°03′04″E
Auburn Vale	Inverell Shire	29°48′54″S 151°00′04″E
Baker	Uralla Shire	30°21′54″S 150°58′04″E
Balala	Uralla Shire	30°39′54″S 151°22′04″E
Baldwin	Uralla Shire	30°31′54″S 151°05′04″E
Barlow	Uralla Shire	30°19′54″S 151°13′04″E
Buchanan	Armidale Regional Council	30°08′54″S 151°17′04″E
Bundarra	Uralla Shire	30°06′54″S 151°05′04″E
Cameron	Uralla Shire	30°18′54″S 150°59′04″E
Chapman	Uralla Shire	30°21′54″S 151°08′04″E
Chigwell	Armidale Regional Council	30°03′54″S 151°08′04″E
Clare	Inverell Shire	29°52′54″S 151°00′04″E
Clerk	Armidale Regional Council	30°00′54″S 151°26′04″E
Clerkness	Uralla Shire	30°08′54″S 151°10′04″E
Cooper	Uralla Shire	30°03′54″S 150°58′04″E
Copes Creek	Armidale Regional Council	29°59′54″S 151°16′04″E
Darby	Armidale Regional Council	29°59′54″S 151°09′04″E
Darbysleigh	Uralla Shire	30°12′54″S 151°03′04″E
Drummond	Uralla Shire	30°14′54″S 151°00′04″E
Elderbury	Armidale Regional Council	30°13′54″S 151°37′04″E
Everett	Armidale Regional Council	30°06′54″S 151°33′04″E
Honeysuckle	Uralla Shire	30°33′54″S 151°16′04″E
Laura	Uralla Shire	30°12′54″S 151°10′04″E
Mackenzie	Armidale Regional Council	30°04′54″S 151°35′04″E
Mayo	Armidale Regional Council	29°56′54″S 151°00′04″E
Moredun	Armidale Regional Council	29°59′54″S 151°30′04″E
Morse	Uralla Shire	30°32′54″S 151°22′04″E
New Valley	Armidale Regional Council	30°02′54″S 151°20′04″E
Nuandle	Uralla Shire	30°31′54″S 151°10′04″E
Ollera	Armidale Regional Council	30°04′54″S 151°28′04″E
Roumalla	Uralla Shire	30°35′54″S 151°13′04″E
Russell	Armidale Regional Council	30°17′54″S 151°21′04″E
Sandy Creek	Armidale Regional Council	30°17′54″S 151°28′04″E
Single	Armidale Regional Council	29°59′54″S 151°21′04″E
Skinner	Armidale Regional Council	30°09′54″S 151°28′04″E
St George	Armidale Regional Council	30°10′54″S 151°22′04″E
Stonybatter	Uralla Shire	30°26′54″S 151°05′04″E
Swinton	Armidale Regional Council	29°55′54″S 151°16′04″E
Tenterden	Armidale Regional Council	30°05′54″S 151°24′04″E
Tienga	Armidale Regional Council	30°02′54″S 150°01′04″E
Torryburn	Uralla Shire	30°24′54″S 151°15′04″E
Williams	Armidale Regional Council	30°13′54″S 151°27′04″E
Yarrowick	Uralla Shire	30°23′54″S 151°22′04″E
