= Waterloo Creek massacre =

Massacre of Australian Gamilaraay peoples 1837–1838

Coordinates: 29°47′36″S 149°27′12″E

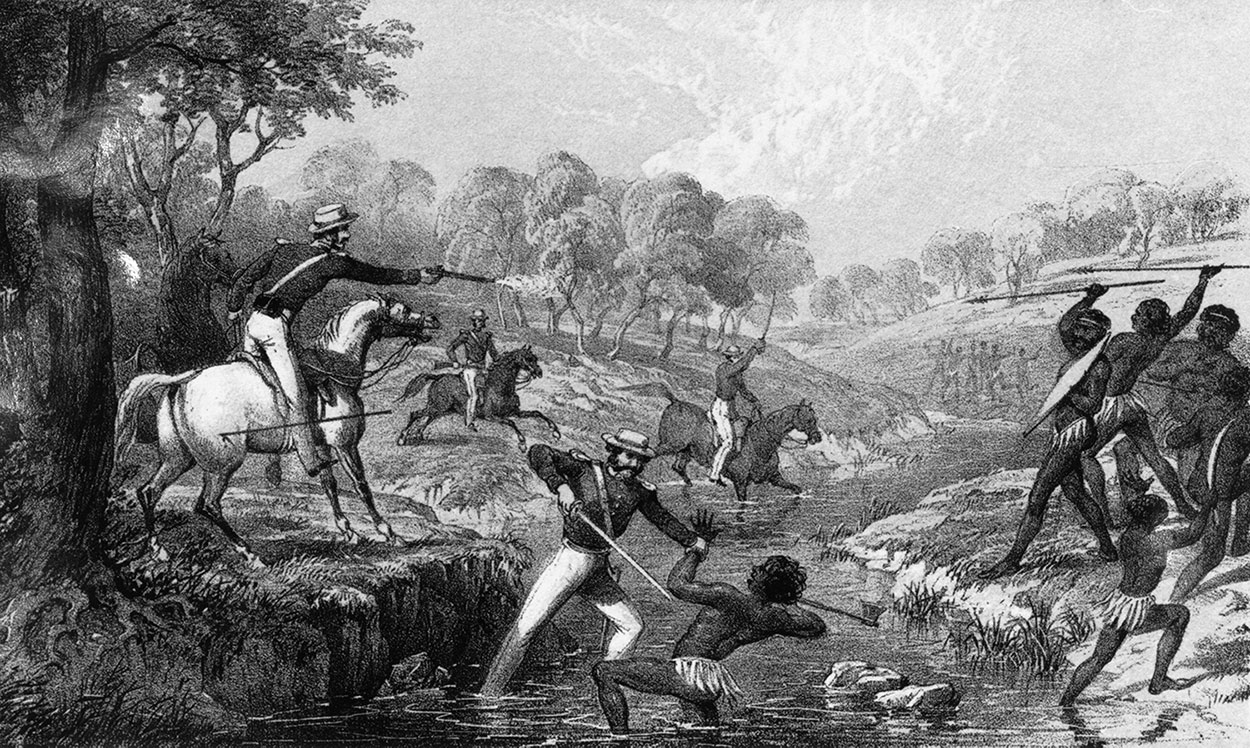
"Mounted Police and Blacks", an 1852 lithograph by W. L. Walton, depicting the killing of Aboriginal warriors at Slaughterhouse Creek by colonial police troopers.

The Waterloo Creek massacre (also Slaughterhouse Creek massacre) refers to a series of violent clashes between mounted settlers, civilians and Indigenous Gamilaraay people, which occurred southwest of Moree, New South Wales, Australia, during December 1837 and January 1838.

The Waterloo Creek Massacre site is listed on the New South Wales Heritage Register as a place of significance in frontier violence leading to the murder of Gamilaraay people.

The events have been subject to much dispute, due to wildly conflicting accounts by various participants and in subsequent reports and historical analyses, about the nature and number of fatalities and the lawfulness of the actions. Interpretations were made again during the Australian history wars which began in the 1990s.

== Events ==
A Sydney mounted police detachment was dispatched by acting Lieutenant Governor of New South Wales Colonel Kenneth Snodgrass, to track down the Namoi, Weraerai and Kamilaroi people who had killed five stockmen in separate incidents, on recently established pastoral runs on the upper Gwydir River area of New South Wales. After two months the mounted police, consisting of two sergeants and twenty troopers led by Major James Nunn, arrested 15 Aboriginals along the Namoi River. They released all but two, one of whom was shot whilst attempting to escape. The main body of Kamilaroi eluded the troopers, thus Major Nunn's party, along with two stockmen, pursued the Kamilaroi for three weeks, from present-day Manilla on the Namoi River north to the upper Gwydir River. On the morning of 26 January, in a surprise attack on Nunn's party, Corporal Hannan was wounded in the calf with a spear, where subsequently members of the Kamilaroi were killed. While one source puts the number of Kamilaroi fatalities at 4-5, there are other sources which say this number was closer to 40-50. The Aboriginals fled down the river as the troopers regrouped, rearmed and pursued them, led by the second-in-command, Lieutenant George Cobban. Cobban's party found their quarry about a mile down the river at a point now known as Waterloo Creek, where a second engagement took place. The encounter lasted several hours and no Aboriginals were captured.

=== Possibly disproportionate force ===
As there had been no declaration of martial law or other authorising legislation, the police lacked authority to use more than reasonable force proportionate to any risk to the safety of persons or property. Nobody at all had a licence to kill. The troopers may therefore have used disproportionate force on people who posed little or no risk. "There was a suspicion that the troopers might have acted as an ill-disciplined military force rather than as a regular police force."

== Official inquiry ==
On 5 March 1838, Nunn submitted a report on his expedition to the newly arrived Governor Gipps.

Within the following month the colony's Executive Council (the Colonial government constituted by the Governor and his advisers) accepted a recommendation of the Attorney General John Plunkett, that there be an official inquiry into the expedition, including the Aboriginal deaths.

The colonial government and the Colonial Office in England were both conscious of a need to extend the rule of law to Aboriginals as well as other "British subjects" in the Colony.

On 6 April 1838 the Executive Council decided to issue regulations in the form of a government notice announcing that there would be an inquiry (that is, a coronial inquiry) into the death of any Aboriginal at the hands of a Colonist in the same way as that held when the death of a Colonist occurred through violence or suddenly. The decision to publish this Inquiry notice was delayed, with the Executive Council deciding to defer publication until after "public excitement" (about the Myall Creek murderers' executions) had abated.

On 14 August 1838 the Legislative Council appointed a Committee of Inquiry into "the present state of Aborigines", to be presided over by the Anglican Bishop, William Broughton.

Gipps's own inquiry into the Nunn expedition was delayed. He claimed to be unable to produce eyewitness evidence from mounted police owing to demands on police attendance elsewhere, and he could not afford to alienate the police volunteers upon whom policing then depended.

Additionally, Colonists away from urban areas were tending to take the law into their own hands.

Some argue that there was a breakdown in law and order, affecting the capacity of the NSW Government to govern.

Although the Nunn inquiry was reactivated on 22 July 1839 at the Merton Courthouse, New South Wales, there were no convictions and the matter was dropped. The only eyewitness accounts of the fatal main engagement were provided by Lieutenant Cobban and Sergeant John Lee. Its outcome did not result in any further judicial proceedings.

Attorney General Plunkett was reluctant to prosecute any of Nunn's expeditionary force, due to the time delays, the unavailability of reliable evidence and popular opposition.

The Executive Council decided to take no further action. It accepted that the Aboriginal deaths at Waterloo Creek were the consequence of the police, led by a military officer, acting honestly even if mistakenly or unwisely, under orders and in execution of their duty, to repel an "aggressive attack" by Aboriginals.

=== Police statements ===
Lieutenant Cobban claimed he rode to the rear of the group and found a large cache of Aboriginal weapons in the bush and secured them. When he returned to the river, he admitted to seeing two Aboriginals being shot, trying to escape and believed that at most three or four Aborigines had been killed in the conflict.

Sergeant John Lee was with the main detachment of mounted police that pursued the Aboriginals into the river. He claimed that 40 to 50 Aboriginals were killed.

== Later historians' views ==
More recently, historians and other commentators have offered varying accounts of the site of the conflict and the number of casualties.

- R. H. W. Reece: The site was at the junction of the Slaughterhouse Creek and the Gwydir River, and 60 or 70 Aboriginals were killed.
- Lyndall Ryan: Sergeant Lee's estimate of 40 to 50 killed is the most reliable.
- Roger Milliss: 200-300 Gamilaraay people were killed around the site of Snodgrass Lagoon at the Lower Waters of Waterloo Creek.

== Site ==
On 25 June 2021, the Waterloo Creek Massacre site at 3837 Millie Road, Jews Lagoon was declared a site of state heritage significance as "a place of frontier conflict" and listed on the New South Wales State Heritage Register. The site is recognised as a significant place as a place of memorial for the Aboriginal community that honours the resistance and resilience of their ancestors. Located along the Waterloo/Millie Creek waterway the site has been largely degraded with only remnant vegetation including leopardwood, weeping myall, brigalow and silver-leaved ironbark.

== See also ==
- List of massacres of Indigenous Australians
