= Wirraayaraay =

Indigenous Australian people of New South Wales

The Weraerai (Wirraayaraay) were an indigenous Australian people of the state of New South Wales.

== Name ==
The Weraerai ethnonym was formed from their word for no, namely transl. wrh – transl. wirai/werai.

== Language ==
The Weraerai language, Wiraiari, is thought to belong to the Wiradjuri branch of the Wiradhuric languages with Robert M. W. Dixon stating that it may be a further dialect of the former.

== Country ==
Norman Tindale estimated their lands as extending over some 4,100 square miles (11,000 km^{2}), on the northern side of the Gwydir River from Moree to Bingara. It took in Yallaroi, and their northernmost extension ran to Warialda and Gilgil Creek, and from Inverell to north of Wallangra on the Macintyre River. Their western frontier was at Garah.

== Mythology and social rite of initiation ==
In one early report by the Reverend Greenway, the Weraerai were said to share much mythology with the Gamilaraay. Using European analogies, he described their supreme god as Baiame, creator of the murri (aboriginal people) who had an earthly regent called Turramūlan, whose name meant 'one-legged' since 'his locomotive instruments, or feet and legs, (were) in the form of an Indian yale, all on one side; hence his name, signifying 'one-legged'. His consort Muni Burribian was delegated with the task of initiating women into the domestic arts. Turramūlan's presence is summoned by the whirling of a bullroarer during the rites of initiation at a bora circle.

Soon the leaders appeared by a long train of aborigines in single file. They were all painted in red, yellow, and white figures, the white prevailing in stripes down their arms and thighs: each was girded with a specially constructed belt or girdle of opossum known as a ghūtūr, (Note: Many texts write this word as Ghooloor, but Greenway in his earliest account transcribed it as written here. Tindale counts among sources for the Weraerai two texts, one of which notes that Orion, known as Berriberri set out in pursuit of the Pleiades (Miai-miai) and cornered them in a mother-tree where they were transformed into yellow and white cockatoos. A more complete account, referred to by Tindale as relevant to the Weraerai, but with a different name for the pursuer (Werrinbah) was given by Greenway in another text. His attempts to capture them were blocked by Turum-bulum, a one-eyed, one-legged legendary figure associated with the Pole star. They called Orion's Belt, ghūtūr/ghooloorr, a girdle that covered his invincible boomerang. (Greenway 1901b, p. 168)) and fringed around by a sort of short kilt made of split opossum, native cat, and squirrel skins respectively, according to the totem to which they belonged. Their hair was dressed in various ways and well combed and greased, then frosted over with swandown or that of other birds, each had round their head under the hair, at the sides and back, a band netted closely and broad where it passed over the forehead, this is known as a ngooloomere (from the covering the forehead) this was of a great variety of colour amongst them. Each carried in his left hand a small packet of very fine ashes or white or grey earth dust, the enclosing material was of soft bark, this was struck by the right hand, thereby emitting some of the powder within, which floating in the air forms a misty cloud all over. The blows were given in solemn cadence chanted in a subdued voice by all, and added much to the real solemnity of the scene...they entered upon another prepared enclosure, in which lay an enormous representation of a serpent made of stuff mud or clay and branded across by yellow, red, and white adornments and bands...Round this figure the whole body marched in much the same style and manner as at their first entrance on the scene, but bending forward occasionally as at certain points fixed simultaneously with a sort of inclination of the body as if expressing reverence. The motions throughout were made with all the accuracy and precision of the most perfectly drilled troops or well taught dancers. When this function was completed and open space prepared there, they formed a square by regularly preserved ranks, and commenced a grand corroboree, moving in unbroken mass forward a space, then backward, then from left to right, then from right to left in one unbroken order, and with faultless precision as to time and manner, their voices and limbs.

== History of contact ==
The Weraerai were reportedly one of the tribes, including the Gamilaraay, that were killed during punitive expeditions that took place and peaked with the Waterloo Creek massacre of 1838.

== Alternative names ==
- Ginniebal
- Juwalarai
- Mooran Mooran (?)
- Waholari
- Walarai
- Walari
- Warlarai
- Wiraiarai, Weraiari
- Wirra:arai
- Wirri-Wirri
- Wolaroi, Woolaroi
- Wolaroo
- Wollen
- Wolroi

Source: Tindale 1974, p. 200

== Some words ==
- merri (domestic dog)
- euchie (wild dog)

== Sources ==
- Barlow, Harriott (1873). "Vocabulary of Aboriginal Dialects of Queensland". The Journal of the Anthropological Institute of Great Britain and Ireland. 2: 165–175. doi:10.2307/2841159. JSTOR 2841159.
- Bootle, F. J. E. (21 February 1899). "Aboriginal words and meanings". Science of Man. 2 (1): 3.
- Dixon, R. M. W. (2002). Australian Languages: Their Nature and Development. Vol. 1. Cambridge University Press. ISBN 978-0-521-47378-1.
- Greenway, C. C. (21 August 1901a). "Borah, "boohra," or "boorhung."". Science of Man. 4 (7): 117–118.
- Greenway, C. C. (22 November 1901b). "Berryberry, aboriginal myth". Science of Man. 4 (10): 168.
- Greenway, C. C. (27 December 1901c). "Constellation Pleiades—Mei-mei". Science of Man. 4 (11): 190–191.
- Greenway, Charles C. (1878). "Kamilaroi language and Traditions". The Journal of the Anthropological Institute of Great Britain and Ireland. 7: 232–274. doi:10.2307/2841001. JSTOR 2841001.
- Hewitt, James Francis Katherinus (1901). History and chronology of the myth-making age (PDF). J. Parker and Co.
- Honery, Thomas (1878). "Wailwun language and traditions". The Journal of the Anthropological Institute of Great Britain and Ireland. 7: 246–254. JSTOR 2841001.
- MacPherson, J. (1904). "Ngarrabul and other aboriginal tribes: distribution of tribes". Proceedings of the Linnean Society of New South Wales. 29: 677–684. doi:10.5962/bhl.part.20175.
- Mathews, R. H. (January 1898). "Initiation Ceremonies of Australian Tribes: Appendix Nguttan initiation ceremony". Proceedings of the American Philosophical Society. 37 (157): 54–73. JSTOR 983694.
- Mathews, R. H. (July–December 1903). "Languages of the Kamilaroi and Other Aboriginal Tribes of New South Wales". The Journal of the Anthropological Institute of Great Britain and Ireland. 33: 259–283. doi:10.2307/2842812. JSTOR 2842812.
- McGuire, J. (22 January 1901). "Linguistics. Wirradgerry tribe". Science of Man. 3 (12): 208–209.
- McGuire, J. (23 May 1902). "Aboriginal customs". Science of Man. 5 (4): 67–68.
- Richardson, T. J.(=T. L.?) (27 June 1904). "Corrections". Science of Man. 7 (5): 76–77.
- Thomas, W. N. (21 November 1900). "Linguistics—Wiraiari tribe". Science of Man. 3 (10): 166–167.
- Thomas, W. N. (21 March 1901a). "Linguistics—Wiraiari tribe". Science of Man. 4 (2): 26–27.
- Thomas, W. N. (22 April 1901b). "Linguistics—Wiraiari tribe". Science of Man. 4 (3): 44–45.
- Tindale, Norman Barnett (1974). "Weraerai (NSW)". Aboriginal Tribes of Australia: Their Terrain, Environmental Controls, Distribution, Limits, and Proper Names. Australian National University Press. ISBN 978-0-708-10741-6.
