= Bangheet, New South Wales =

Bangheet New South Wales
- Coordinates: 29°49′34″S 150°23′37″E
- Population: 37 (2021 census)
- Postcode(s): 2404
- LGA(s): Inverell Shire
- State electorate(s): Northern Tablelands
- Federal division(s): New England

Bangheet is a locality located in the Gwydir Shire of New South Wales.

== Demographics ==
As of the 2021 Australian census, 37 people resided in Bangheet, down from 41 in the 2016 census. The median age of persons in Bangheet was 56 years. There were fewer males than females, with 48.6% of the population male and 51.4% female. The average household size was 2 people per household.
