= Upper Horton, New South Wales =

Upper Horton New South Wales
- Coordinates: 30°08′S 150°26′E
- Population: 138 (SAL 2021)
- Postcode(s): 2347
- LGA(s): Gwydir Shire
- State electorate(s): Northern Tablelands
- Federal division(s): New England

Upper Horton is a small village and surrounding agricultural area located near the Horton River in northern New South Wales, Australia. The community of Upper Horton lies high in the Horton River Valley. It is accessed from the Fossickers Way with the turnoff 13 km (8 mi) north of Barraba and a journey of 19 km (12 mi) to the village.

The village does not have a school; people living in the area usually travel to Barraba for school. The Upper Horton district is included within the Gwydir Shire local government area.

The major event of the village is the very popular and highly regarded New Year’s Day Rodeo. The Upper Horton Post Office opened on 1 September 1899.
