= Dinoga, New South Wales =

Dinoga New South Wales
- Coordinates: 29°58′54″S 150°35′4″E
- Population: 61 (2016 census)
- Postcode(s): 2404
- Time zone: AEST (UTC+10)
  - Summer (DST): AEDT (UTC+11)
- LGA(s): Gwydir Shire
- Region: New England
- State electorate(s): Northern Tablelands
- Federal division(s): New England

Dinoga is a small rural locality in the Gwydir Shire, part of the New England region of New South Wales, Australia.

At the 2016 census, the town recorded a population of 61.
