= Pallal, New South Wales =

Pallal New South Wales
- Coordinates: 29°58′12″S 150°25′44″E
- Population: 83 (2016 census)
- Postcode(s): 2404
- Time zone: AEST (UTC+10)
  - Summer (DST): AEDT (UTC+11)
- LGA(s): Gwydir Shire
- Region: New England
- State electorate(s): Northern Tablelands
- Federal division(s): New England

Pallal is a small rural locality in the Gwydir Shire, part of the New England region of New South Wales, Australia.

At the 2016 census, the town recorded a population of 83.
