= Coolatai, New South Wales =

Coolatai New South Wales
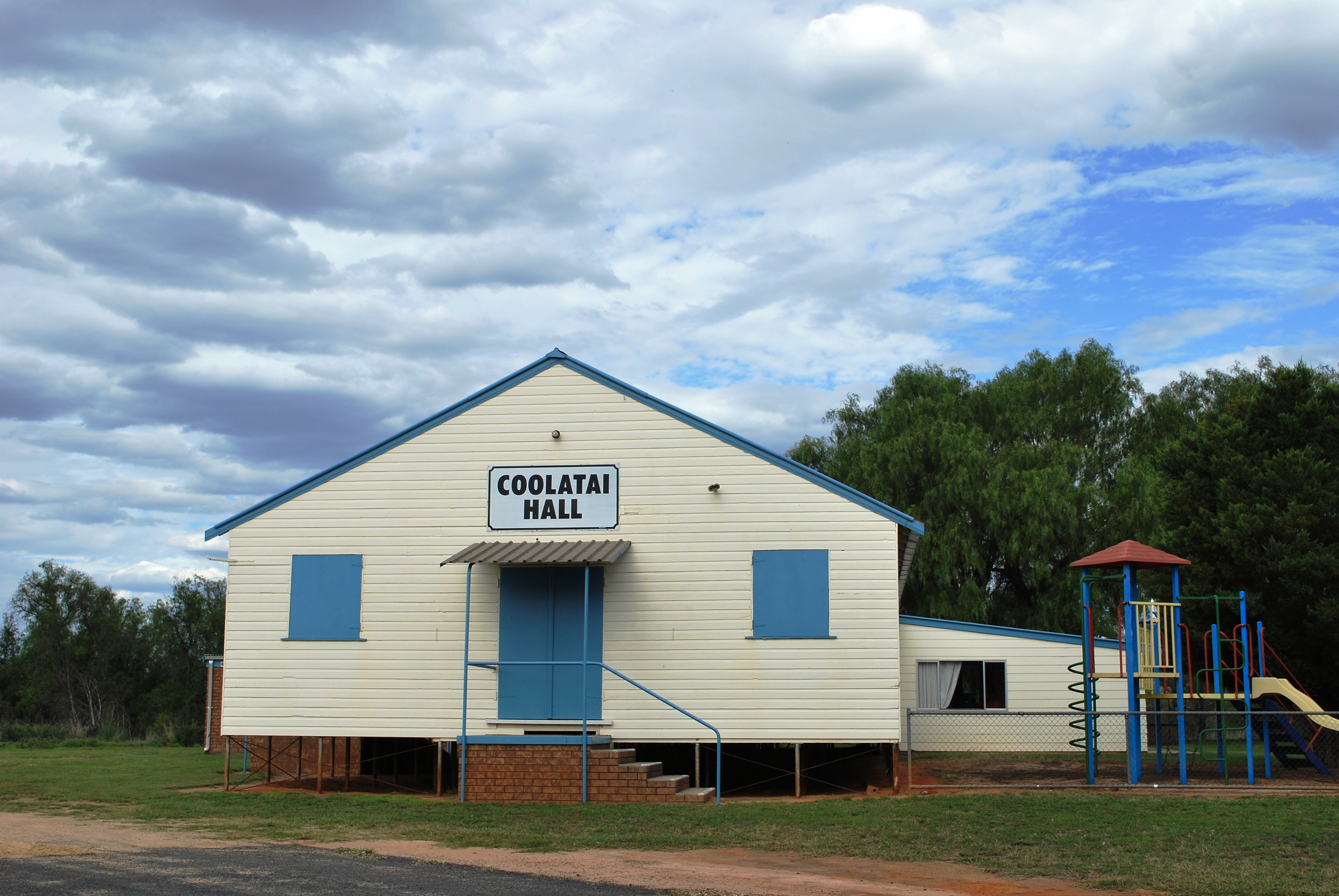
- Coolatai Hall

- Coordinates: 29°15′S 150°45′E
- Population: 99 (SAL 2021)
- Postcode(s): 2402
- Location: 615 km (382 mi) N of Sydney; 410 km (255 mi) SW of Brisbane; 117 km (73 mi) NE of Moree; 37 km (23 mi) N of Warialda
- LGA(s): Gwydir Shire
- State electorate(s): Northern Tablelands
- Federal division(s): New England

Coolatai is a town in the New England region of northern New South Wales, Australia. The town is located 615 kilometres (382 mi) north of the state capital, Sydney in Gwydir Shire local government area. At the 2006 census, Coolatai and the surrounding area had a population of 179.

Coolatai Post Office opened on 15 February 1898 and closed around 1980.
