= Gwydir Shire =

- Local government area
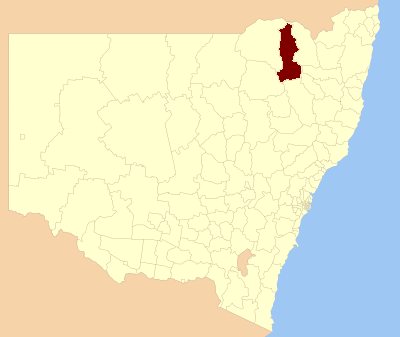
- Location in New South Wales

- Interactive map of Gwydir Shire
- Coordinates: 29°52′S 150°34′E
- Country: Australia
- State: New South Wales
- Region: New England
- Established: 17 March 2004
- Council seat: Bingara

Government
  - Mayor: Tiffany Galvin (Unaligned)
  - State electorate: Northern Tablelands
  - Federal division: New England

Area
  - Total: 9,452.8 km^{2} (3,649.7 sq mi)

Population
  - Total: 4,910 (2021 census)
  - Density: 0.5194/km^{2} (1.3453/sq mi)
- Website: Gwydir Shire
LGAs around Gwydir Shire
Moree Plains	Goondiwindi (Qld)	Inverell
Moree Plains	Gwydir Shire	Armidale
Narrabri	Tamworth	Uralla

Gwydir Shire is a local government area located in the New England region of New South Wales, Australia. The northern boundary of the Shire is located adjacent to the border between New South Wales and Queensland.

The Shire was established on 17 March 2004, when the Yallaroi, Bingara, and a northern portion of the Barraba shires were merged. The seat of the council is located in the major centre of the area in the town of Bingara. Other major towns include Warialda.

The mayor of the Gwydir Shire Council is Tiffany Galvin, who is unaligned with any political party.

== Towns and localities ==
The towns of Gwydir Shire include Warialda and Bingara, and the villages/localities include Back Creek, Bangheet, Caroda, Cobbadah, Coolatai, Copeton, Crooble, Croppa Creek, Dinoga, Elcombe, Gineroi, Gravesend, Gulf Creek, Gundamulda, North Star, Pallal, Riverview, Upper Bingara, Upper Horton, Warialda Rail, Yagobe, and Yallaroi. The locality of Myall Creek is split between Gwydir Shire (the southern part of the locality), Inverell Shire (the northern part of the locality) and Barraba is somewhat split between Tamworth Regional Council (The southern part of the locality) and Gwydir Shire (The northern part of the locality)

== History ==
The first local government in the Gwydir region was the Bingara Municipality, incorporated to serve the town of Bingara in early 1889. The town of Warialda followed on 30 March 1900.

With the passage of the Local Government Act 1906 (NSW), which established shires all over New South Wales, the Yallaroi, Gwydir (later Bingara) and Barraba Shires were gazetted on 6 March 1906. The Warialda and Bingara municipalities amalgamated into their respective shires on 29 December 1924 and 17 December 1943 respectively.

On 17 March 2004, the Yallaroi, Bingara and Barraba Shires were abolished. Yallaroi and Bingara were fully amalgamated into the newly formed Gwydir Shire, while Barraba was split between Gwydir, which received 1,259.1 square kilometres (486.1 sq mi) (41%) of its area and 340 people in the former shire's north, and the newly formed Tamworth Regional Council.

== Demographics ==
At the 2011 census, there were 4,965 people in the Gwydir local government area, of these 50.6 per cent were male and 49.4 per cent were female. Aboriginal and Torres Strait Islander people made up 3.8 per cent of the population which is marginally above both the national and state averages of 2.5 per cent. The median age of people in the Gwydir Shire was 45 years; higher than the national median of 37 years. Children aged 0–14 years made up 19.0 per cent of the population and people aged 65 years and over made up 22.6 per cent of the population. Of people in the area aged 15 years and over, 50.8 per cent were married and 11.1 per cent were either divorced or separated.

Between the 2006 census and the 2011 census the Gwydir Shire experienced negative population growth in both absolute and real terms. When compared with total population growth of Australia for the same periods, being 5.78 per cent and 8.32 per cent respectively, population growth in the Gwydir local government area was significantly lower than the national average. The median weekly income for residents within the Gwydir Shire was significantly below the national average.

At the 2011 census, the proportion of residents in the Gwydir local government area who stated their ancestry as Australian or Anglo-Saxon exceeded 92 per cent of all residents (national average was 65.2 per cent). In excess of 77 per cent of all residents in the Gwydir Shire nominated a religious affiliation with Christianity at the 2011 census, which was significantly higher than the national average of 50.2 per cent. Meanwhile, as at the census date, compared to the national average, households in the Gwydir local government area had a significantly lower than average proportion (2 per cent) where two or more languages are spoken (national average was 20.4 per cent); and a significantly higher proportion (96.7 per cent) where English only was spoken at home (national average was 76.8 per cent).

=== Selected historical census data ===
Selected historical census data for Gwydir Shire local government area
Census year		2006	2011
Population	Estimated residents on Census night	5,311	▼4,965
Population	LGA rank in terms of size within New South Wales		113th
Population	% of New South Wales population		0.07%
Population	% of Australian population	0.03%	▼0.02%
Cultural and language diversity			
Ancestry, top responses	Australian		37.4%
Ancestry, top responses	English		35.2%
Ancestry, top responses	Irish		8.3%
Ancestry, top responses	Scottish		8.0%
Ancestry, top responses	German		3.3%
Language, top responses (other than English)	German	0.1%	0.1%
Language, top responses (other than English)	Hindi	n/c	▲0.1%
Language, top responses (other than English)	Filipino	n/c	▲0.1%
Language, top responses (other than English)	Dutch	0.2%	▼0.1%
Language, top responses (other than English)	Irish	n/c	▲0.1%
Religious affiliation			
Religious affiliation, top responses	Anglican	45.1%	▼43.9%
Religious affiliation, top responses	Catholic	21.2%	▲21.3%
Religious affiliation, top responses	No religion	8.4%	▲11.9%
Religious affiliation, top responses	Presbyterian and Reformed	7.8%	▼7.4%
Religious affiliation, top responses	Uniting Church	5.1%	▼4.7%
Median weekly incomes			
Personal income	Median weekly personal income	A$328	A$387
Personal income	% of Australian median personal income	70.4%	▼67.1%
Family income	Median weekly family income	A$730	A$907
Family income	% of Australian median family income	62.3%	▼61.2%
Household income	Median weekly household income	A$612	A$726
Household income	% of Australian median household income	59.6%	▼58.8%

=== Historical population data ===
Populations for the Yallaroi and Bingara Shires (including municipalities) over time are listed below. Totals are not provided as it is difficult to quantify the component from Bingara Shire. Using the Australian Bureau of Statistics' time series data and census collection district figures for 2006, this component had a population of 591 in 1996, 447 in 2001 and 340 in 2006.

Year	Population (Yallaroi)	Population (Bingara)
1921	3,228	2,637
1933	4,279	3,237
1947	3,669	2,862
1954	4,672	2,940
1961	4,588	2,851
1966	4,481	2,744
1971	4,302	2,486
1976	4,101	2,245
1981	3,947	2,264
1986	3,821	2,290
1991	3,540	2,133
1996	3,227	2,080
2001	3,124	2,002

The census populations of the Gwydir Shire area were:

Year	Population	Reference
1996	5,898	
2001	5,573	
2006	5,311	
2011	4,965	

== Council ==
=== Current composition and election method ===
Gwydir Shire Council is made up of nine councillors elected proportionally as a single ward. All councillors are elected for a fixed four-year term of office. The mayor is elected by the councillors at the first meeting of the council. The most recent election was held on 4 December 2021.

== Election results ==
=== 2024 ===
2024 New South Wales local elections: Gwydir
Party	Candidate	Votes	%	±%
Independent	Tiffany Galvin (elected)	503	16.9	+1.6
Independent	1. Ravi Gill; 2. Adrian Willmot (elected)	428	14.4	
Independent	Sarah Crump (elected)	331	11.1	
Independent National	Mick Collins (elected)	316	10.6	
Independent	Sean Coleman (elected)	242	8.1	
Independent	Rachel Sherman (elected)	229	7.7	
Independent	John Bishton (elected)	206	6.9	
Independent	Marilyn (Mashy) Dixon (elected)	165	5.5	−4.5
Independent	Scot Crispin (elected)	156	5.2	
Independent	Lyndon Mulligan	140	4.7	−3.6
Independent	Stuart Dick	119	4.0	
Independent	Allan Reddan	100	3.4	
Independent	Sally-Anne Robertson	45	1.5	
Total formal votes		2,980	93.3	
Informal votes		214	6.7	
Turnout		3,194	82.9	

=== 2021 ===
2021 New South Wales local elections: Gwydir
Party	Candidate	Votes	%	±%
Independent National	John Coulton (elected)	617	21.0	
Independent	Tiffany Galvin (elected)	449	15.3	
Independent	Chris Matthews (elected)	381	13.0	
Independent	Marilyn Dixon (elected)	293	10.0	
Independent	David Coulton (elected)	262	8.9	
Independent	Lyndon Mulligan (elected)	245	8.3	
Independent	Jim (Curly) Moore (elected)	236	8.0	
Independent	Catherine Egan (elected)	200	6.8	
Independent	Geoffrey Smith (elected)	173	5.9	
Independent	Frances Young	84	2.9	
Total formal votes		2,940	95.7	
Informal votes		133	4.3	
Turnout		3,073	81.5	
Party total votes
Independent		2,323	79.0	
Independent National		617	21.0	
