= Bingara, New South Wales =

Bingara
- Town
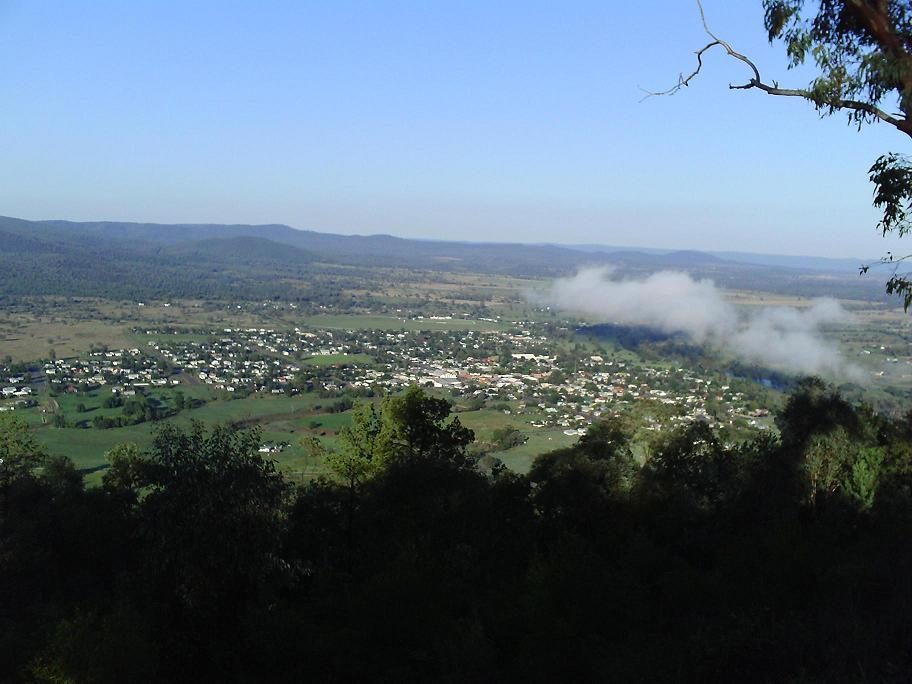
- View from HF Batterham Memorial Lookout

- Coordinates: 29°52′0″S 150°34′0″E
- Country: Australia
- State: New South Wales
- LGA: Gwydir Shire
- Location: 54 km (34 mi) W of Inverell; 141 km (88 mi) N of Tamworth; 449 km (279 mi) N of Sydney; 358 km (222 mi) SW of Brisbane
- Established: c.1840

Government
  - Federal division: New England
- Elevation: 296 m (971 ft)

Population
  - Total: 1,028 (UCL 2021)
- Postcode: 2404
- County: Murchison
- Mean max temp: 26.2 °C (79.2 °F)
- Mean min temp: 10.2 °C (50.4 °F)
- Annual rainfall: 741.0 mm (29.17 in)

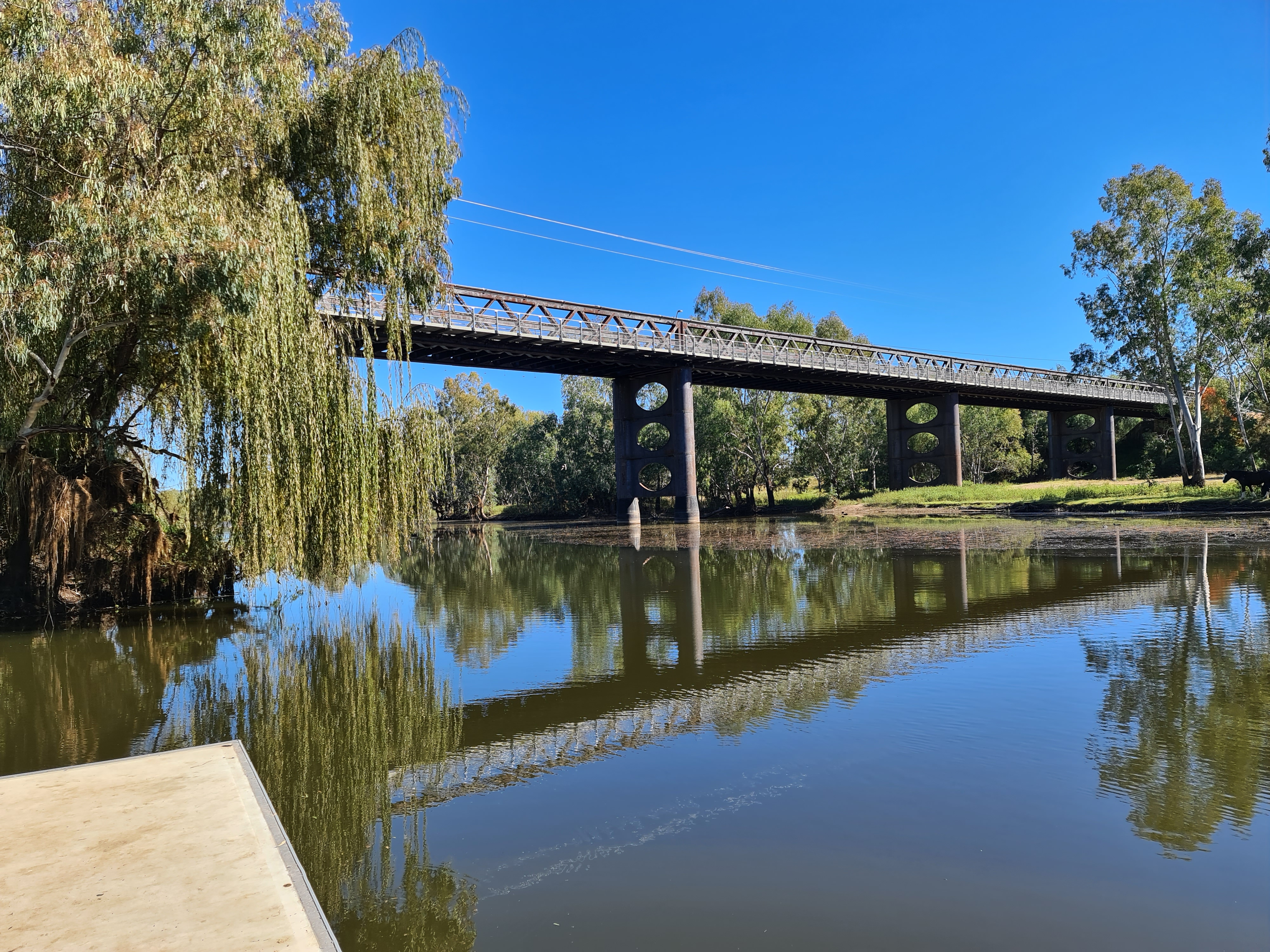
Bridge over Gwydir

Bingara (Gamilaraay for 'creek') is a small town on the Gwydir River in Murchison County in the New England region of New South Wales, Australia. Bingara is currently the administrative centre for the Gwydir Shire that was created in 2003. The Gwydir River is part of the Murray-Darling catchment area.

== Location ==
Bingara is located 141 km north of Tamworth, 54 km west of Inverell, 449 km north of Sydney and 358 km south west of Brisbane. Bingara is located very close to Myall Creek, the site of the massacre of 27 to 30 Indigenous Australians.

== History ==
Before British colonisation the Bingara region was within the country of the Wirraayaraay people.

In 1827, British explorer Allan Cunningham crossed the Gwydir River near Bingara. At the time he mistook the river to be the Peel River, but realised his mistake on his return journey.

British colonisation at Bingara began in 1836 with the arrival of the pastoralist squatter Thomas Simpson Hall. Hall established the Bingara leasehold as a sheep and cattle station. The local indigenous people initially resisted Hall's incursion and both Aboriginal and Europeans were killed in the resulting skirmishes. Hall himself received a spear wound to his head during one of these battles. A detachment of New South Wales Mounted Police under Sergeant John Temple were dispatched to the area and, accompanied by Hall's armed stockmen, exacted a "terrible retribution upon the blacks". The creek running through Bingara is named Hall's Creek after Thomas Simpson Hall.

The discovery of gold in 1852 brought prospectors to the area. In the 1880s, copper and diamonds were discovered also, causing a rapid development of the town. Bingara is one of the few places in Australia where diamonds have been found. In fact, Bingara was the largest producer of diamonds in Australia at that time. Bingara changed the spelling of its name from Bingera to Bingara in 1890. The first Bingera Post Office opened on 1 January 1853 and was renamed Upper Bingera in 1862 and closed in 1868. The second Bingera office opened in 1862 and was renamed Bingara in 1890.

== Heritage listings ==
Bingara has a number of heritage-listed sites, including:

- 74 Maitland Street: Roxy Theatre and Peters Greek Cafe Complex
- Bingara Delungra Road, Myall Creek: Myall Creek Massacre and Memorial Site

== Population ==
Historical population
Year	Pop.	±%
1921	1,014	—
1933	1,448	+42.8%
1947		—
1954	1,465	—
1961	1,485	+1.4%
1966	1,504	+1.3%
1971	1,401	−6.8%
1976	1,295	−7.6%
1981	1,257	−2.9%
1986	1,363	+8.4%
1991	1,231	−9.7%
1996	1,236	+0.4%
2001	1,172	−5.2%
2006	1,207	+3.0%
2011	1,093	−9.4%
2016	1,074	−1.7%
2021	1,028	−4.3%
Source: Australian Bureau of Statistics data.

According to the 2016 census of Population, there were 1,428 people in Bingara. 82.7% of people were born in Australia and 88.2% of people only spoke English at home. The most common responses for religion were Anglican 38.6%, Catholic 16.8% and No Religion 15.2%.

It is a popular site for retirement with 57% of the population aged 55 years and over, compared to the national average of 27.6% and a median age of 61. The median weekly household income for Bingara is $743 which is lower than the national median of $1,438.

== Sport ==
Bingara sporting life consists of the Bingara Bullets (rugby league), Gwydir River Rats (rugby union) and the Bingara District Cricket Association (cricket) with the representative team being Gwydir First XI. Notable sporting people include Andrew Hart (ex St George), sports broadcaster David Fordham, and Sydney jockey Adrian Robinson also originates from Bingara.

== Climate ==
Bingara has a humid subtropical climate (Köppen: Cfa, Trewartha: Cfak/Cfal), with hot summers and cool winters.

Climate data for Bingara Post Office, New South Wales, Australia (1878–present normals and extremes); 296 m AMSL
Month	Jan	Feb	Mar	Apr	May	Jun	Jul	Aug	Sep	Oct	Nov	Dec	Year
Record high °C (°F)	40.6 (105.1)	41.7 (107.1)	39.4 (102.9)	35.6 (96.1)	29.1 (84.4)	25.0 (77.0)	25.5 (77.9)	27.7 (81.9)	35.0 (95.0)	39.4 (102.9)	42.8 (109.0)	41.7 (107.1)	42.8 (109.0)
Mean daily maximum °C (°F)	33.6 (92.5)	32.8 (91.0)	30.8 (87.4)	26.7 (80.1)	22.1 (71.8)	18.1 (64.6)	17.7 (63.9)	19.1 (66.4)	23.2 (73.8)	26.9 (80.4)	30.3 (86.5)	32.9 (91.2)	26.2 (79.1)
Daily mean °C (°F)	25.9 (78.6)	25.1 (77.2)	22.8 (73.0)	18.4 (65.1)	14.2 (57.6)	10.9 (51.6)	10.0 (50.0)	11.3 (52.3)	14.6 (58.3)	18.6 (65.5)	22.0 (71.6)	24.7 (76.5)	18.2 (64.8)
Mean daily minimum °C (°F)	18.1 (64.6)	17.3 (63.1)	14.8 (58.6)	10.1 (50.2)	6.2 (43.2)	3.7 (38.7)	2.2 (36.0)	3.4 (38.1)	6.0 (42.8)	10.2 (50.4)	13.6 (56.5)	16.5 (61.7)	10.2 (50.3)
Record low °C (°F)	10.8 (51.4)	9.2 (48.6)	6.7 (44.1)	2.2 (36.0)	−3.3 (26.1)	−6.9 (19.6)	−6.7 (19.9)	−6.1 (21.0)	−1.7 (28.9)	0.0 (32.0)	3.3 (37.9)	5.7 (42.3)	−6.9 (19.6)
Average precipitation mm (inches)	90.9 (3.58)	86.1 (3.39)	64.0 (2.52)	40.5 (1.59)	48.4 (1.91)	49.9 (1.96)	50.4 (1.98)	43.5 (1.71)	45.5 (1.79)	64.8 (2.55)	71.8 (2.83)	80.0 (3.15)	735.8 (28.96)
Average precipitation days (≥ 1.0 mm)	6.1	5.5	4.9	3.4	4.0	4.7	4.8	4.4	4.5	5.6	5.9	6.4	60.2
Source: Australian Bureau of Meteorology (temperature, precipitation- 1878–present normals and extremes)

== Notable people ==
- Nate Butler (sheepdog handler)
- Andrew Cowper (air force officer)
- John Fordham (talent agent)
