= Gwydir =

Gwydir may refer to:

Australia

- Division of Gwydir, electoral division
- Gwydir by-election, 1989
- Gwydir Highway, New South Wales
- Gwydir River, New South Wales
- Gwydir Shire, New South Wales
- Gwydir Wetlands, New South Wales

United Kingdom

- Gwydir Castle, Conwy, Wales
- Gwydir Forest, Conwy, Wales
- Gwydyr House, Whitehall, London
- Gwydyr Mansions, Hove, East Sussex
- Gwydir Street, a residential terraced street constructed in 1863 in Cambridge
- Gwydir Cottage, a Grade II listed property in Sidmouth, Devon

== See also ==
- Baron Gwydyr, an extinct title in the Peerage of Great Britain
