= Mount Russell =

Mount Russell could mean:

- Mount Russell (Alaska), a significant peak of the Alaska Range southwest of Mount McKinley (Denali)
- Mount Russell (Antarctica), in the Queen Maud Mountains of Antarctica
- Mount Russell (California), a fourteener in the Sierra Nevada just north of Mount Whitney
- Mount Russell (Riverside County, California), a mountain in the Perris Block overlooking Lake Perris
- Mount Russell (British Columbia), a 1,740 m summit on Vancouver Island
- Mount Russell, New South Wales, Australia

== See also ==
- Russell Mountain
