= Tareelaroi Weir =

- Location of the Tareelaroi Weir in New South Wales
- Country: Australia
- Location: North West Slopes, New South Wales
- Coordinates: 29°26′46″S 150°01′53″E
- Purpose: Flood control
- Status: Operational
- Owner: State Water Corporation

Dam and spillways
- Type of dam: Weir
- Impounds: Gwydir River

Reservoir
- Total capacity: 2,500 ML (88×10^{6} cu ft)

The Tareelaroi Weir is a weir across the Gwydir River, located in the North West Slopes region of New South Wales, Australia. The principal purpose of the weir is to mitigate the flow of water, especially in times of peak flows. The impounded reservoir is also called the Tareelaroi Weir.

== Location and features ==
The Tareelaroi Weir is located 20 kilometres (12 mi) east of the town of Moree, and around 10 kilometres (6.2 mi) west of the village of Pallamallawa. The siting of the weir is downriver from the confluence of the Gwydir and Mehi Rivers. In times of major flooding, Tareelaroi Weir can be rendered useless as floodwater simply flows around it on the surrounding floodplain.

When full, Tareelaroi Weir reservoir holds 2,500 megalitres (88×10^{6} cu ft) of water.

Tareelaroi Weir is owned by the State Water Corporation of New South Wales. The reservoir is used for fishing and water-skiing; and is a popular picnic and barbecue location.
