= Mehi River =

River in New South Wales, Australia

Coordinates: 29°34′00″S 149°30′00″E

Mehi River Gwydir River, Meei River
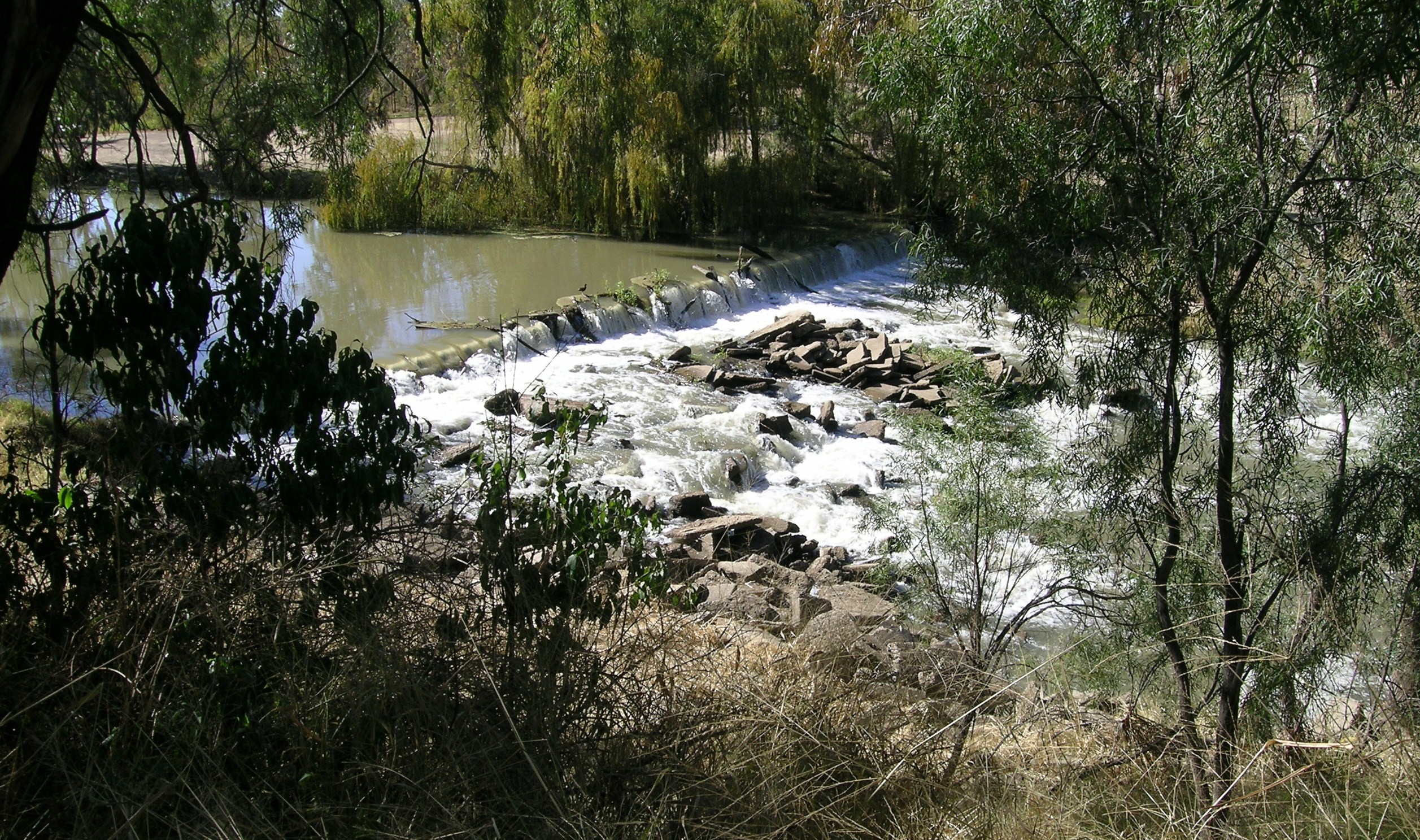
- Mehi River Weir at Moree

Location
- Country: Australia
- State: New South Wales
- Region: IBRA: Darling Riverine Plains
- District: Orana
- Municipalities: Moree Plains, Walgett

Physical characteristics
- Source: an offtake from the Gwydir River
  - location: near Pallamallawa
  - elevation: 227 m (745 ft)
- Mouth: confluence with the Barwon River
  - location: near Collarenebri
  - elevation: 145 m (476 ft)
- Length: 314 km (195 mi)

Basin features
- River system: Murray–Darling basin

The Mehi River is a perennial watercourse that is part of the Barwon catchment within the Murray–Darling basin, located in the Orana district of New South Wales, Australia.

The river rises from the Gwydir River west of Pallamallawa, and flows generally west and west-southwest, joined by eight minor tributaries, before reaching its confluence with the Barwon River near Collarenebri. It descends 82 metres (269 ft) over its 314-kilometre (195 mi) course.

== History ==
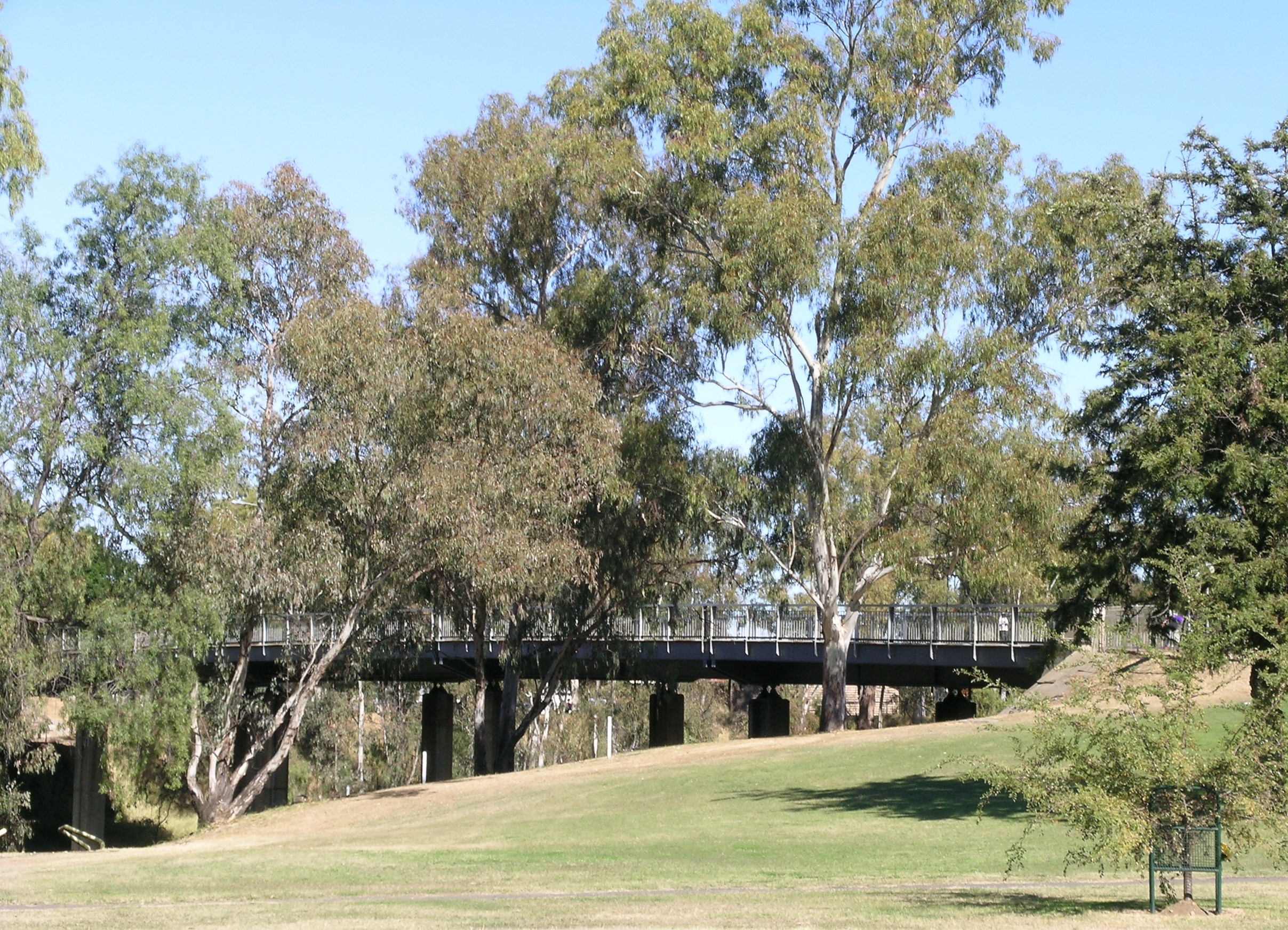
Mehi River Bridge at Moree

The river which branches off at the Tareelaroi Weir was previously known as the Gwydir River or Meei River. The Geographical Names Board of New South Wales officially named Mehi as the 160 kilometres (99 mi) tributary of the Gwydir River in 1975 ending years of confusion over the naming of this section.

In 1889 a timber bridge was erected over the Mehi River at Moree. Another bridge was built over Mehi River, Moree in April 1960. A bridge over the Mehi River, west of Moree, was completed in December 1995. A total of four bridges cross the Mehi River in Moree; two of these bridges are low-level and subject to flooding.

The area adjoining the river has numerous attractive riverside parks, golf links and reserves. The Mehi River jetty at Moree is a popular spot for water sports.

During 2008 plans were drawn up to install a fish passage at Moree which will open up a 300 kilometres (190 mi) "freeway" for native fish between Copeton Dam and Collarenebri. The Barwon River-Gwydir Catchment Management Authority has provided $175,000 to Moree Plains Shire Council to install a fish passage at the Moree Town Weir. The Mehi River and the Carole and Gil Gil creeks have been channelised to assist with delivery of water to the irrigation industry.

Native fish that are found in the Gwydir-Mehi river system include bony bream, Murray cod, spangled perch, golden perch, which are often known as yellowbelly and eel-tailed catfish.

=== Flooding ===
Moree has been flooded regularly over the years by the Mehi River. Recent major flooding reached a peak of 10.21 metres (33.5 ft), on 27 November 2011, on the Moree gauge, the 4th highest flood in the history of Moree. The highest ever flood was in February 1955 where the Mehi River reached a peak of 10.85 metres (35.6 ft) which left 800 buildings in northern Moree with flooding above floor level. The Gwydir Highway, too is subject to flooding of the Gwydir and Mehi Rivers (the highway is actually on an island in the middle of these two rivers near Collarenebri). Moree can also become isolated by road and rail when floods are high enough. Such was the case in the February 1971 floods when Moree was isolated for two weeks. Vast agricultural areas in the Mehi River floodplain become flooded in large floods. Some areas remained underwater for days, and in some cases, as long as a couple of weeks costing farmers thousands of dollars in ruined crops.

== See also ==
- Rivers of New South Wales
- List of rivers of Australia
