= Yagobie, New South Wales =

Railway station in New South Wales, Australia

Coordinates: 29°53′29″S 150°25′30″E

Yagobie is a locality on the Inverell railway line in north-western New South Wales, Australia. It was a site of a railway station and tank opened in 1900 and closed in 1975. The area takes its name from a cattle station established in 1844 and later subdivided. The Gwydir River flows through the area, and a low level road crossing was constructed in the late 1930s.

Preceding station	Former services	Following station
Biniguy towards Moree	Inverell Line	Gravesend towards Inverell
