= Biniguy, New South Wales =

Biniguy New South Wales
- Coordinates: 29°32′20″S 150°12′30″E
- Population: 147 (2011 census)
- Postcode(s): 2399
- Elevation: 246 m (807 ft)
- Location: 645 km (401 mi) NNW of Sydney; 39 km (24 mi) E of Moree
- LGA(s): Moree Plains Shire
- State electorate(s): Northern Tablelands
- Federal division(s): Parkes

Biniguy is a village in Moree Plains Shire of New South Wales in Australia. At the 2016 census, the village and surrounding area had a population of 147. The village is located on the Gwydir Highway approximately 40 km (25 mi) from Moree, the main service centre for the region and 645 km (401 mi) by road from the state capital Sydney. The village is prone to seasonal flooding; in February 2012 the entire village was evacuated by helicopter to Moree

A railway station was opened on 1 February 1900 with the first section of the Inverell branch, and operated until 3 December 1985, following the withdrawal of passenger trains on the line. The railway line was progressively closed, with the last section between Moree and Biniguy being listed as out of use in 1994. Today Biniguy is served by Monday to Saturday NSW TrainLink coach services to Grafton and Moree on alternate days. The village formerly had its own post office, general store and public school, however these facilities closed during the 1960s and 70s, with most community services now being provided in Moree.

The main employment industry in Biniguy is agriculture. There is a silo site operated by GrainCorp for the receiving and storage of grain located in the town, although this site was announced subject to closure in 2006 As of 2010, the silo is still operating and included in GrainCorp's network of receiving sites. The Trawalla Pecan Farm was established in 1965. It is operated by Stahmann Farms and is the largest pecan farm in the Southern Hemisphere, located on the banks of the Gwydir River, a few kilometres to the west of Biniguy.

Preceding station	Former services	Following station
Wubbera towards Moree	Inverell Line	Yagobie towards Inverell
