= Warialda railway station =

Former railway station in New South Wales, Australia

General information
- Location: Railway Pde, Warialda Rail NSW; Australia
- Coordinates: 29.5817°S 150.53910°E
- Elevation: 316 metres (1,037 ft)
- Line: Inverell railway line
- Distance: 740 km

History
- Opened: 25 November 1901
- Closed: 3 December 1985
Location

Warialda railway station is a disused railway station 6 kilometres (3.7 mi) SW of Warialda, New South Wales, Australia on the Inverell railway line 481 kilometres (299 mi) NNW of Sydney (740 kilometres (460 mi) by rail).
