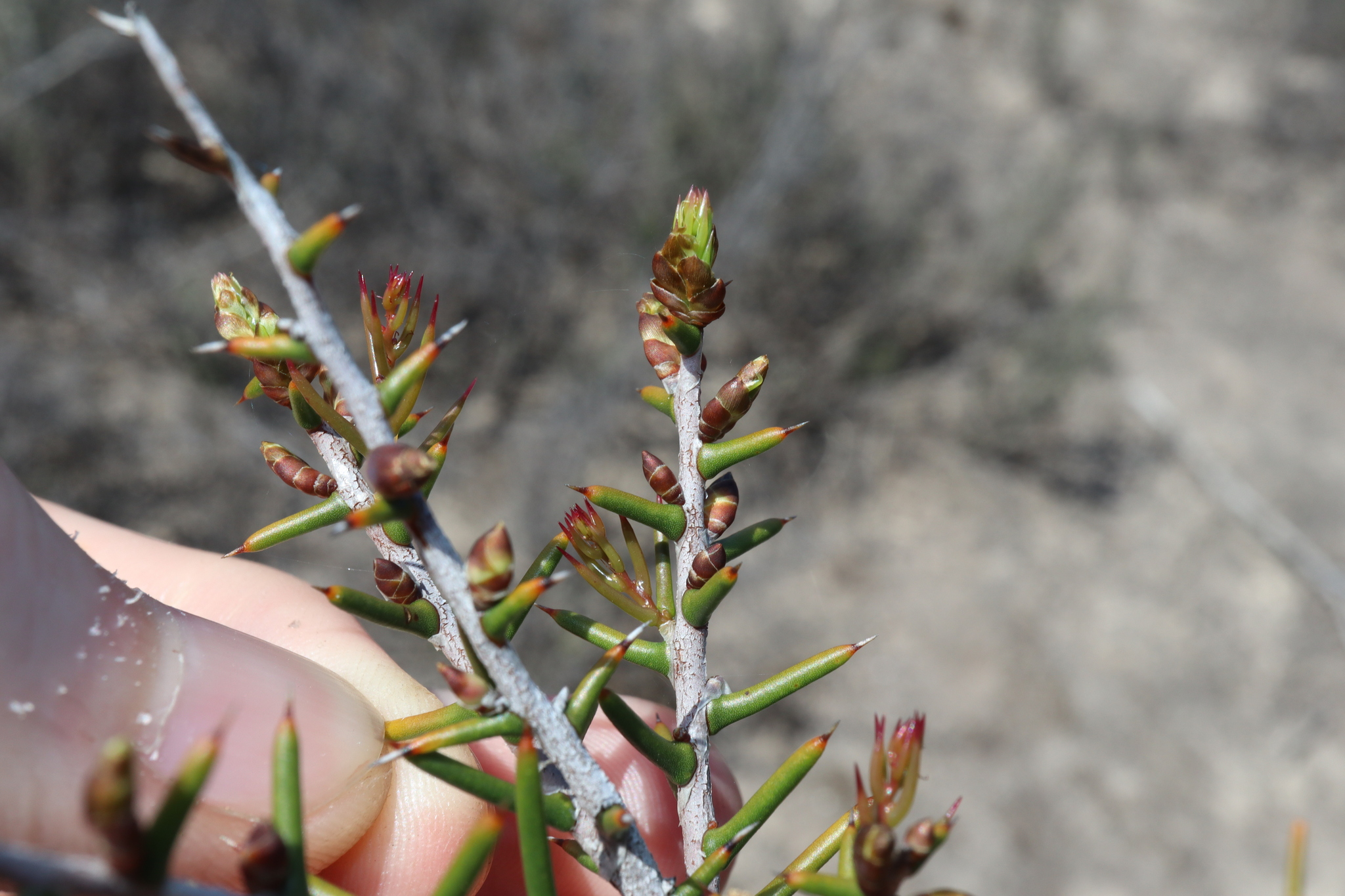

Scientific classification
- Kingdom: Plantae
- Clade: Tracheophytes
- Clade: Angiosperms
- Clade: Eudicots
- Clade: Rosids
- Order: Fabales
- Family: Fabaceae
- Subfamily: Caesalpinioideae
- Clade: Mimosoid clade
- Genus: Acacia
- Subgenus: Acacia subg. Phyllodineae
- Species: A. pachypoda

Binomial name
- Acacia pachypoda Maslin
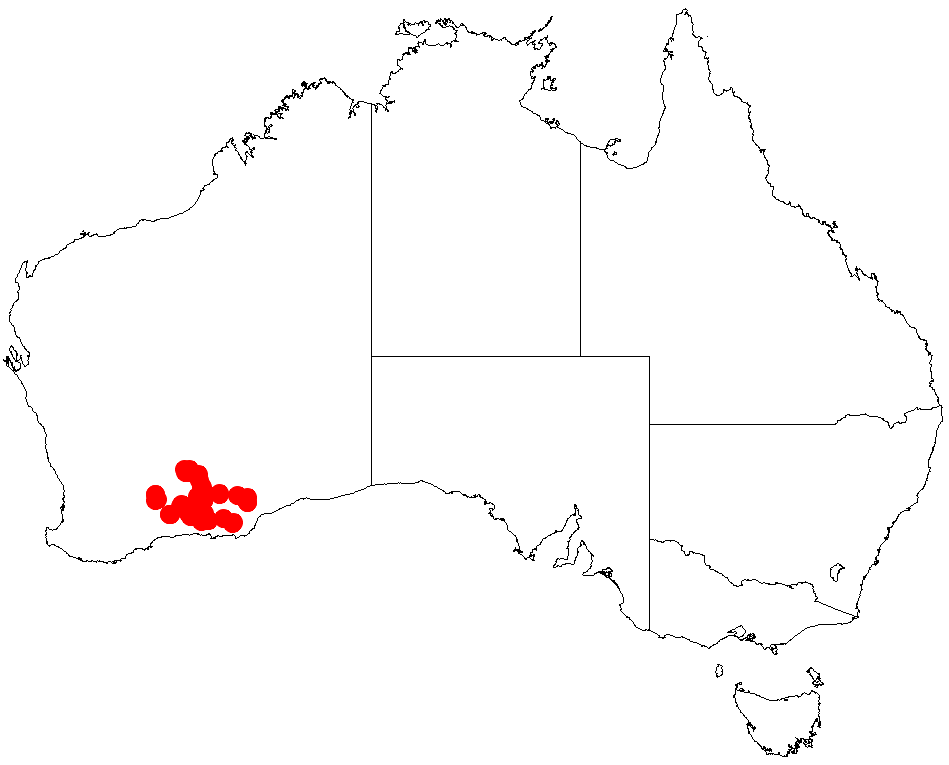
- Occurrence data from AVH

= Acacia pachypoda =

Species of legume

Acacia pachypoda is a species of shrub in the family Fabaceae. It is endemic to south western Australia.

== Description ==
The spreading and prickly shrub typically grows to a height of 0.3 to 0.7 metres (1.0 to 2.3 ft) that has glabrous branches with light grey coloured bark. The coarsely pungent branchlets are rigid, terete and have no ribbing. Like most species of Acacia it has phyllodes rather than true leaves. The pungent, rigid and green phyllodes are mostly patent with a length if 7 to 26 mm (0.28 to 1.02 in) and a diameter of about 1 mm (0.039 in). It blooms from August to September and produces cream-yellow flowers. The inflorescences occur in pairs of groups of three on a raceme with a length of around 1 mm (0.039 in). The spherical flower-heads contain around eight loosely packed cream coloured flowers. The seed pods that form after flowering have a linear shape with a length that is up to 5 cm (2.0 in) and a width of 2 to 3 mm (0.079 to 0.118 in). The dark brown coloured and crustaceous pods have longitudinally arranged seeds inside. The dark brown seeds have an oblong shape with a length of 3.5 to 4 mm (0.14 to 0.16 in) with a terminal white aril.

== Taxonomy ==
The species was first formally described by the botanist Bruce Maslin in 1974 as a part of the work Studies in the genus Acacia - Miscellaneous new phyllodinous species as published in the journal Nuytsia. It was reclassified as Racosperma pachypodum in 2003 by Leslie Pedley then transferred back to genus Acacia in 2006. A. pachypoda is closely related to Acacia castanostegia and similar in appearance to Acacia atrox. The specific epithet is taken from the Ancient Greek παχύς pakhús "thick" and πούς poús "foot".

== Distribution ==
It is native to an area in the eastern Wheatbelt and Goldfields-Esperance regions of Western Australia where it is commonly situated on low rocky hills and undulating plains growing in rocky clay or sandy or stony loam soils. It has a scattered distribution from around Coolgardie in the north west to around the Frank Hann National Park in the south and east out to around Fraser Range as a part of Eucalyptus woodland or Mallee scrubland communities.
