= Gravesend, New South Wales =

Gravesend
- Town
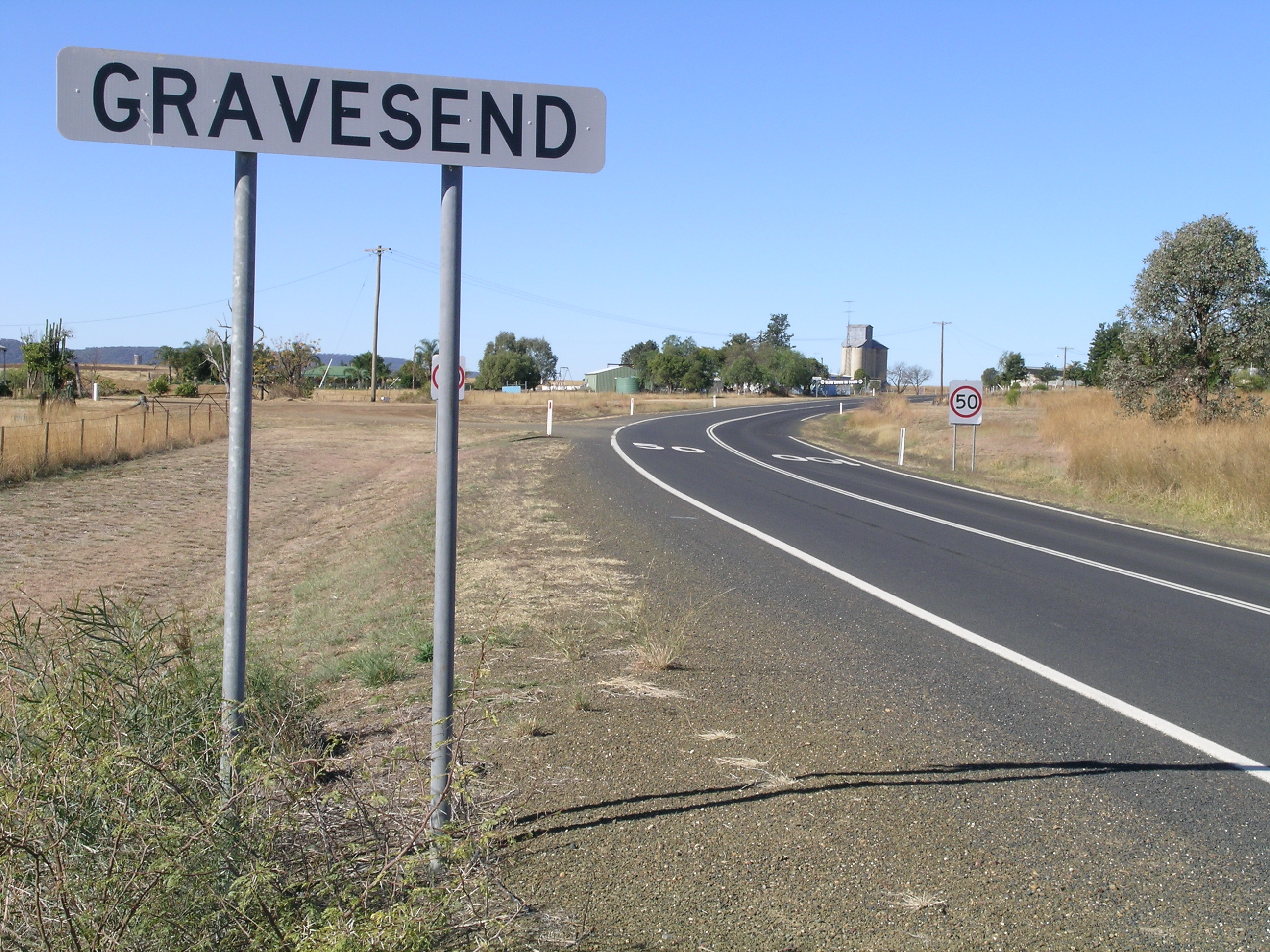
- Gwydir Highway, Gravesend

- Coordinates: 29°35′0″S 150°19′0″E
- Country: Australia
- State: New South Wales
- LGA: Gwydir Shire
- Location: 615 km (382 mi) N of Sydney; 521 km (324 mi) SW of Brisbane; 216 km (134 mi) N of Tamworth; 55 km (34 mi) E of Moree; 25 km (16 mi) W of Warialda

Government
  - State electorate: Northern Tablelands
  - Federal division: New England
- Elevation: 275 m (902 ft)

Population
  - Total: 299 (2021 census)
- Postcode: 2401
- County: Burnett

Gravesend is a village on the North West Slopes of New South Wales, Australia. The town is located 25 km west of Warialda on the Gwydir Highway near the Gwydir River and in the Gwydir Shire local government area, 615 kilometres (382 mi) north of the state capital, Sydney. At the 2021 census, Gravesend and the surrounding area had a population of 299. The village is situated at an elevation of approximately 275 metres (904 feet).

== History ==
Gravesend is located on the lands of the Gamilaraay and Wirraayaraay peoples.

The first recorded Europeans to the area was an exploration party led by botanist Allan Cunningham in May 1827.

Squatters then moved into the area and took up vast tracts of land to run sheep and cattle. These included Edward George Clerk, who established Clerkness in 1837, which extended from the Gwydir to the MacIntyre Rivers, and John Hoskinson, who owned Caraa.

In 1837 a massacre of up to 200 Indigenous people took place in the area. Conflict had worsened after Europeans carried out armed attacks on Gomeroi people to abduct women, which had resulted in the killing of livestock and five colonists by Gomeroi.

Henry Bingham, Commissioner for Crown Lands, wrote:

I am well informed those men armed themselves with Muskets and made a rush, on the camp of those Blacks in order to deprive them by force, of their women and in revenge for this they have fallen sacrifice to their own lawless conduct.

Missionary Lancelot Threlkeld wrote that the vigilantes "came upon the tribe, found some with the clothes of the murdered shepherds on their backs" and so set about killing them. It is believed Gravesend took its name from the hundreds of graves at the site of the massacre.

The town grew from a fettler's camp established on Gravesend station with the coming of the railway around 1900. Gravesend Post Office opened on 1 February 1900. The old railway bridge across the Gwydir River was transported from England.

With closer settlement a village developed and was officially named Gravesend in 1909. In the 1930s, Gravesend was the site of a research station breeding cactoblastis moths later released to eradicate a devastating prickly pear infestation. The surrounding area is given to agriculture production with sheep and cattle breeding, and the local wheat crops being taken a large silo complex being based in the village.

Today, Gravesend is serviced by a public school with approximately 30 students, post office, hotel, recreation and rodeo ground, community centre, District Nurse, a park with play equipment and a general store. The Gwydir River provides excellent fishing, camping, picnic, swimming and recreation areas. The official opening of the Historical Society Museum was held on 16 August 2008. An annual rodeo is held on the rodeo ground. The village also has a fishing club, sewing and quilting club, garden club, Pony Club and playgroup.

Preceding station	Former services	Following station
Yagobie towards Moree	Inverell Line	Syfield towards Inverell
