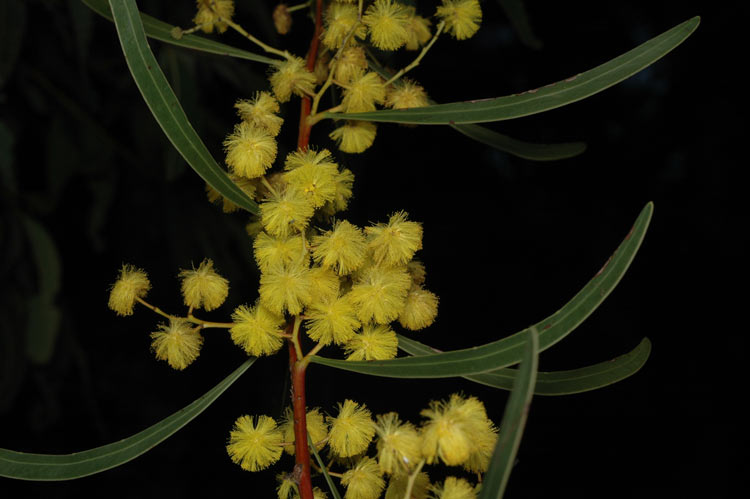
- In the Australian National Botanic Gardens

Scientific classification
- Kingdom: Plantae
- Clade: Tracheophytes
- Clade: Angiosperms
- Clade: Eudicots
- Clade: Rosids
- Order: Fabales
- Family: Fabaceae
- Subfamily: Caesalpinioideae
- Clade: Mimosoid clade
- Genus: Acacia
- Species: A. gladiiformis

Binomial name
- Acacia gladiiformis A.Cunn. ex. Benth.
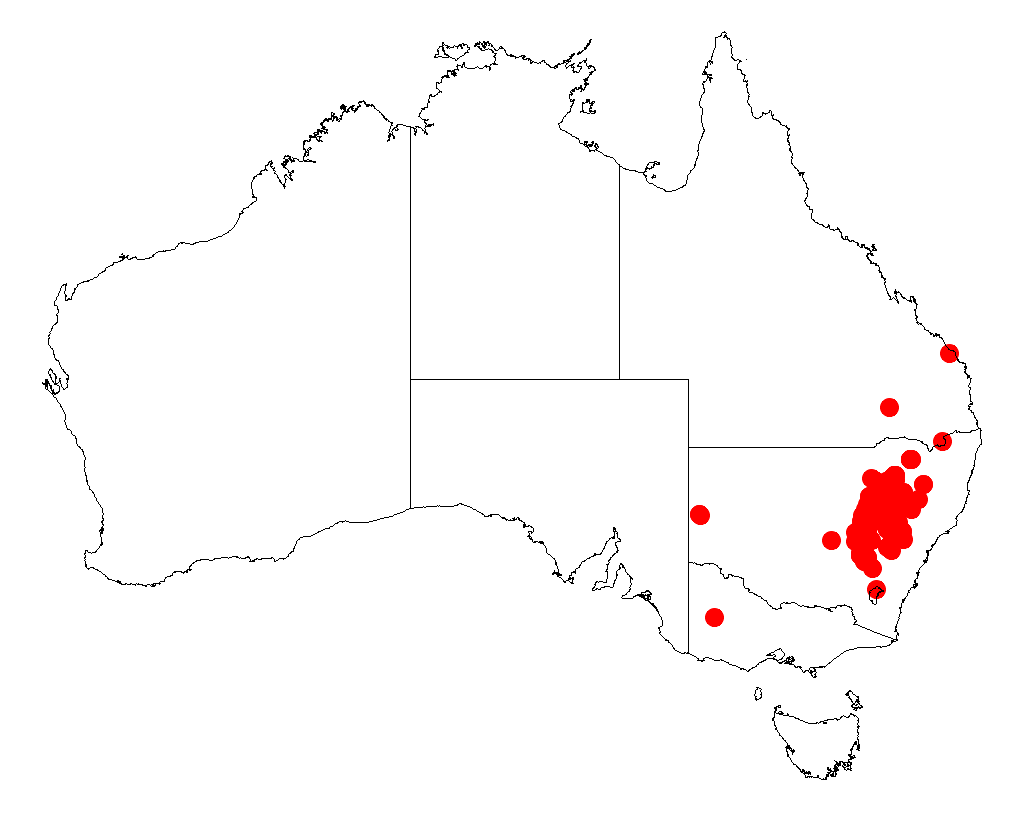
- Occurrence data from AVH

Synonyms
- "Racosperma gladiiforme" (A.Cunn. ex Benth.) Pedley

= Acacia gladiiformis =

Sword wattle

Species of legume

Acacia gladiiformis, commonly known as sword wattle or sword-leaf wattle, is a species of flowering plant in the family Fabaceae and is endemic to eastern Australia. It is an open, erect or spreading shrub with glabrous, reddish brown branchlets, narrowly lance-shaped phyllodes with the narrower end towards the base, spherical heads of golden yellow flowers and linear, thinly leathery pods rounded over the seeds.

== Description ==
Acacia gladiiformis is an open, erect or spreading shrub that typically grows to a height of 1–4 m (3 ft 3 in – 13 ft 1 in) and has glabrous, reddish brown branchlets. Its phyllodes are narrowly lance-shaped with the narrower end towards the base and more or less sickle-shaped, 70–150 mm (2.8–5.9 in) long and 6–12 mm (0.24–0.47 in) wide with a prominent midvein and edges. The flowers are borne in three to twelve spherical heads in racemes 20–60 mm (0.79–2.36 in) long on peduncles 3–6 mm (0.12–0.24 in) long. The heads are about 10 mm (0.39 in) in diameter, with 30 to 45 golden yellow flowers. Flowering usually occurs between June and October and the pods are linear, straight to slightly curved, 60–150 mm (2.4–5.9 in) long, 5–10 mm (0.20–0.39 in) wide, thinly leathery and raised over the seeds. The seeds are oblong to elliptic, 4–5 mm (0.16–0.20 in) wide with a club-shaped aril.

== Taxonomy ==
Acacia gladiiformis was first formally describedin 1842 by the botanist George Bentham from specimens collected by Allan Cunningham in Hooker's London Journal of Botany. The specific epithet it taken from the Latin word for sword in reference to the shape of the phyllodes.

== Distribution and habitat ==
Sword wattle is found on the tablelands and western slopes of the Great Dividing Range from Warialda to Cowra in New South Wales and in Queensland, where it grows in Eucalyptus forest and woodland in rocky soils over and around granite or sandstone.

== Conservation status ==
Acacia gladiiformis is listed as of "least concern" under the Queensland Government Nature Conservation Act 1992.

== See also ==
- List of Acacia species
