= The Warialda Watchman =

The Warialda Watchman, 12 January 1899

The Warialda Watchman was a weekly English-language newspaper published in Warialda, New South Wales, Australia. This newspaper was published by Alfred Wiskens from 12 January 1899 and is believed to have ceased publication in the same year. Some issues were published with supplements.

== History ==
Numerous newspapers were published in New South Wales during the nineteenth century. A wide range of public information sources, including newspapers, were produced to influence regional consciousness through the agenda of issues that they reported. A survey of New England newspapers, the region that includes Warialda, shows a geographical bias in news reporting.

== Digitisation ==
The paper has been digitised as part of the Australian Newspapers Digitisation Program of the National Library of Australia.

== See also ==
- List of newspapers in New South Wales
- List of newspapers in Australia
