= Vail Mountain =

Vail Mountain may refer to:

- Vail Mountain (Colorado)
- Vail Mountain (Missouri)
