= Melanie Dyer =

Australian singer and songwriter

- Origin: Mount Russell, New South Wales
- Genre: Country
- Occupations: Singer; songwriter
- Instrument: Vocals
- Years active: 2015–present
- Labels: UMA, ABC Music
- Website: melaniedyer.com.au

Melanie Dyer is an Australian singer and songwriter from Mount Russell, New South Wales. Her third studio album Daisies from Dirt released in October 2026 became her first to enter the ARIA Charts top 50.

== Early life ==
Dyer grew up on a family farm in Mount Russell, New South Wales. At 12 years of age, she front her first gig at a local pub. Throughout her teens, Dyer competed in several talent quests in the Tamworth scene.

== Career ==
=== 2012: The Voice ===
In 2012, Dyer auditions for The Voice (Australian TV series) season 1, where she performed "Domino". She failed to achieve a chair turn and was eliminated in the blind auditions. Before leaving the set however, Dyer was approached by a representative from Universal Music Australia who wanted to sign her. Thereafter, she was signed and began her country music career.

=== 2015–2016: Debut EP, Fresh and Between You & Me ===
In April 2015, Dyer released her debut EP . The title track spent several weeks in the CMC Top 50 alongside singles "Busy Doing Nothing" and "My Stupid Mouth" achieving Australian Country Music Airplay Chart Top 10.

In August 2017 Dyer released her debut album Fresh. The title track and "Save My Cents", achieved further CMC chart success. The title Top 10 finalist in the International Songwriting Competition in 2018.

In August 2021, Dyer announced she had signed with ABC Music. In September 2021 Dyer released her first single “Run of the Road” on the ABC Music label.

In March 2022, Dyer won the Country / Americana category for the APRA AMCOS Professional Development Awards and awarded a $10,000 prize.

In September 2022, Dyer released her second studio album, Between You & Me.

=== 2025–present: Move to Nashville and Daisies from Dirt ===
In 2025, Dyer relocated to Nashville, Tennessee. In October 2026, Dyer released Daisies from Dirt.

== Discography ==
=== Studio albums ===
List of Studio albums
Title	Album details	Peak chart positions
Title	Album details	AUS
Fresh	Released: August 2017; Label: Universal Music Australia; Formats: CD, digital download	–
Between You & Me	Released: September 2022; Label: Melanie Dyer / ABC; Formats: CD, digital download,	–
Daisies from Dirt	Scheduled: 23 October 2026; Label: Melanie Dyer / ABC; Formats: CD, digital download, streaming	23

=== Extended plays ===
List of extended plays
Title	Album details	Peak chart positions
Title	Album details	AUS
Lifetime	Released: April 2015; Label: Universal; Formats: digital download	

== Awards and nominations ==
=== APRA Awards ===
Since 1982 the APRA Awards are run by Australian Performing Right Association to recognise songwriting skills, sales and airplay performance by its members annually.

Year	Nominee / work	Award	Result	Ref.
2021	Most Performed Country Work	"Memphis T-Shirt" by Melanie Dyer ( Emily Doty, Melanie Dyer, Karen Kosowski)	Nominated	
2024	Most Performed Country Work	"Got it Good" by James Johnston (Michael De Lorenzis, Melanie Dyer, James Johnston, Michael Paynter)	Nominated	
2025	Most Performed Country Work	"Good Things" by Kaylee Bell (Kaylee Bell, Michael De Lorenzis, Melanie Dyer, Michael Paynter)	Nominated	
