= Warialda Standard =

Warialda Standard was a newspaper produced at Warialda, New South Wales. It covered news in the towns of Warialda, Bingara, Coolatai, Croppa Creek, North Star, Yetman, and Delungra. It merged with The Bingara Advocate to become Gwydir News in 2018.

Front page of The Warialda Standard and Northern Districts' Advertiser, 10 April 1900

== History ==
The Warialda Standard has been in publication since 1894 and is also known as The Warialda Standard and Northern Districts' Advertiser. In 1900, Robert Buist from the Warialda Standard was on the Committee of the New South Wales Country Press Association (NSWCPA). The Warialda Standard joined the NSWCPA in 1989. The current editor of the publication is Laura Carroll.

== Digitisation ==
The paper has been partially digitised as part of the Australian Newspapers Digitisation Program of the National Library of Australia.

== See also ==
- List of newspapers in New South Wales
- List of newspapers in Australia
