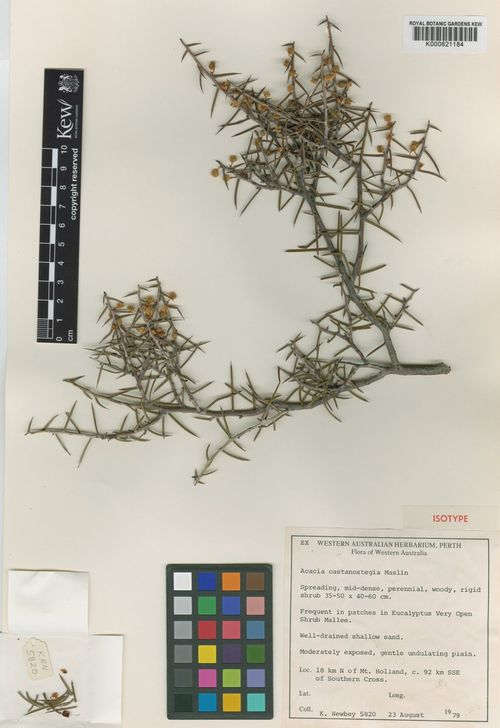

Scientific classification
- Kingdom: Plantae
- Clade: Tracheophytes
- Clade: Angiosperms
- Clade: Eudicots
- Clade: Rosids
- Order: Fabales
- Family: Fabaceae
- Subfamily: Caesalpinioideae
- Clade: Mimosoid clade
- Genus: Acacia
- Species: A. castanostegia

Binomial name
- Acacia castanostegia Maslin
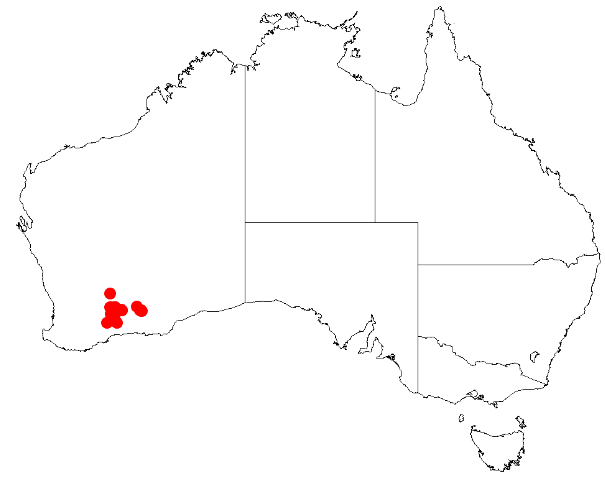
- Occurrence data from AVH

Synonyms
- Acacia aff. pachypoda [P43] (K.R.Newbey 5820); Racosperma castanostegium (Maslin) Pedley

= Acacia castanostegia =

Species of legume

Acacia castanostegia is a species of flowering plant in the family Fabaceae and is endemic to an area in the southwest of Western Australia. It is a dense, rounded, glabrous and prickly shrub with many branches, linear phyllodes, spherical heads of cream-coloured flowers, and linear to flattened, thinly leathery to thinly crust-like pods.

== Description ==
Acacia castanostegia is a dense, spreading, glabrous and prickly shrub that typically grows up to 50 cm (20 in) high, 60 cm (24 in) wide, has many branches and light grey bark. The branchlets are terete and have yellow ribs alternating with brown to light green and covered with a white loose surface. The phyllodes are linear, 11–29 mm (0.43–1.14 in) long, 1.0–1.5 mm (0.039–0.059 in) wide, straight or sometimes curved, rigid and sharply pointed. The flowers are arranged in a spherical head in axils, on a peduncle 3–4.5 mm (0.12–0.18 in) long. There are conspicuous, overlapping brown bracts at the base of the heads. Each head has 6 to 8 cream-coloured flowers. Flowering occurs from June to October, and the pods are linear, round to flattened in cross section, thinly leathery to thinly crusty, dark grey-brown 30–80 mm (1.2–3.1 in) long and 3.0–3.5 mm (0.12–0.14 in) wide with oblong, dark brown seeds 3.0–3.5 mm (0.12–0.14 in) wide with a creamy white, club-shaped aril.

This wattle species is closely related to Acacia pachypoda.

== Taxonomy ==
Acacia castanostegia was first formally described in 1999 by Bruce Maslin in the journal Nuytsia from specimens collected 18 km (11 mi) north of Mount Holland and 92 km (57 mi) south-south-east of Southern Cross by Ken Newbey in 1979. The specific epithet (castanostegia) means 'a chestnut brown shelter or cover', referring to the conspicuous brown bracts that enclose the young heads of flowers.

== Distribution and habitat ==
This species of wattle grows in sand and gravelly soils in woodland, open scrub and heath in scattered locations in the Coolgardie and Mallee bioregions of south-western Western Australia.

== Conservation status ==
Acacia castanostegia is listed as "not threatened" by the Government of Western Australia Department of Biodiversity, Conservation and Attractions.

== See also ==
- List of Acacia species
