= Delungra, New South Wales =

Delungra New South Wales
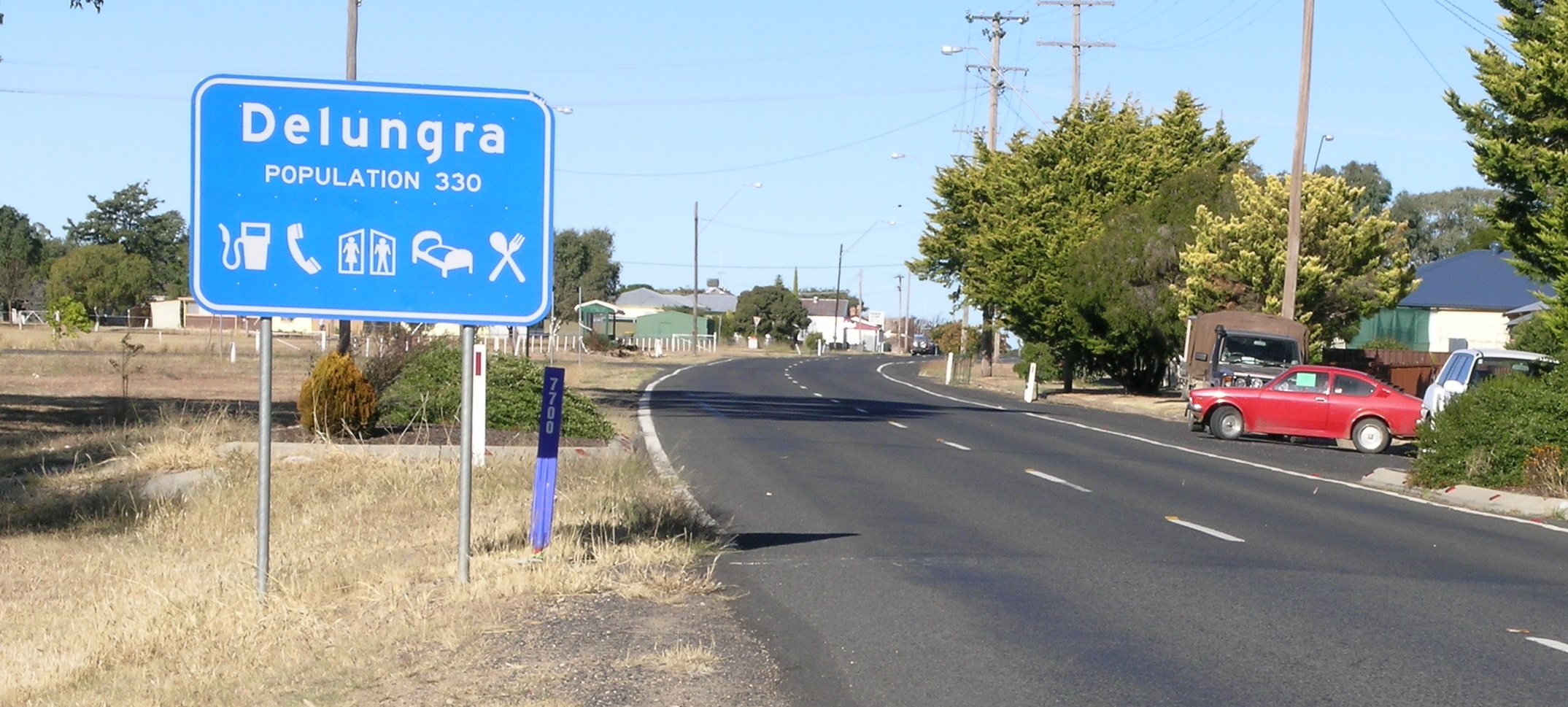
- Delungra

- Coordinates: 29°39′S 150°50′E
- Population: 647 (2016 census)
- Postcode(s): 2403
- Elevation: 602 m (1,975 ft)
- Location: 594 km (369 mi) N of Sydney; 466 km (290 mi) SW of Brisbane; 152 km (94 mi) NW of Armidale; 33 km (21 mi) W of Inverell; 43 km (27 mi) NE of Bingara
- LGA(s): Inverell Shire
- County: Burnett
- State electorate(s): Northern Tablelands
- Federal division(s): New England
Mean max temp	Mean min temp	Annual rainfall
?	?	709 mm 27.9 in

Delungra is a small town on the Gwydir Highway, 33 kilometres (21 mi) from Inverell and 43 kilometres (27 mi) from Bingara in Inverell Shire, New South Wales, Australia. At the 2016 census, Delungra and the surrounding area had a population of 647. The urban centre had a population of 285.

Delungra was incorporated as a town in 1907 and celebrated the centenary of the town combined with Australia Day celebrations in 2007. An earlier Reedy Creek Post Office was renamed Delungra on 11 June 1906.

in 2015, Delungra was named Australia's lowest-earning postcode by the Australian Taxation Office, with a mean taxable income of just $21,691.

Delungra has two horse events each year, with campdrafting in March, and a horse sports weekend in October.

A number of annual events also occur throughout the year such as an Australia Day parade on 26 January, a Christmas parade followed by carols by candlelight at Christmas time. On 25 April and the 11 November there are remembrance services for those that have died during times of war. Up until 2013, the Delungra salt flats held the Barwon Land Speed record competition every January. The current record is 45.35 km/h held by a donkey-drawn cart from the US.

While no temperature records are kept for Delungra, the Delungra Post Office has been keeping rainfall records since November 1924, and before that Gunnee Station (8 km north) kept records between 1879 and 1924. Below is annual rainfall statistics to 30 September 2011:

- Mean: 719.7mm
- High: 1,319.6mm (1879)
- Low: 388.6mm (1902)

The nearest automated weather stations are 30 km to the east at the Inverell Research Centre and 109 km to the west at the Moree Airport.

== Notable residents ==
- Betsy Rivers Jackes, Australian botanist and author. Born in Bingara but raised in Delungra
- Thelma Plum, singer and songwriter

Preceding station	Former services	Following station
Warialda towards Moree	Inverell Line	Mount Russell towards Inverell
