= Vail Mountain (Missouri) =

Summit in the US state of Missouri

Coordinates: 37°34′05″N 90°40′21″W

Vail Mountain is a summit in Iron County, in the U.S. state of Missouri. The summit has an elevation of 1,404 feet (428 m). Vail Mountain lies to the east of Russell Mountain, and Missouri Route CC (the road to the summit of Taum Sauk Mountain) passes just west of the summit. Routes 21 and 72 traverse the south spur of the mountain before heading south through Royal Gorge. The summit is about 3 miles (4.8 km) southwest of Arcadia and Ironton.

Vail Mountain has the name of the local Vail family.
