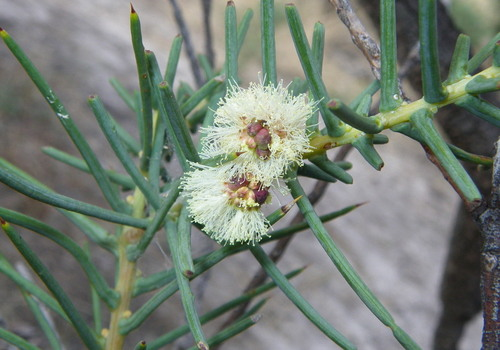
- On the Moree Plains

Conservation status
- Critically Endangered (NSWBCA)

Scientific classification
- Kingdom: Plantae
- Clade: Tracheophytes
- Clade: Angiosperms
- Clade: Eudicots
- Clade: Rosids
- Order: Fabales
- Family: Fabaceae
- Subfamily: Caesalpinioideae
- Clade: Mimosoid clade
- Genus: Acacia
- Species: A. atrox

Binomial name
- Acacia atrox Kodela
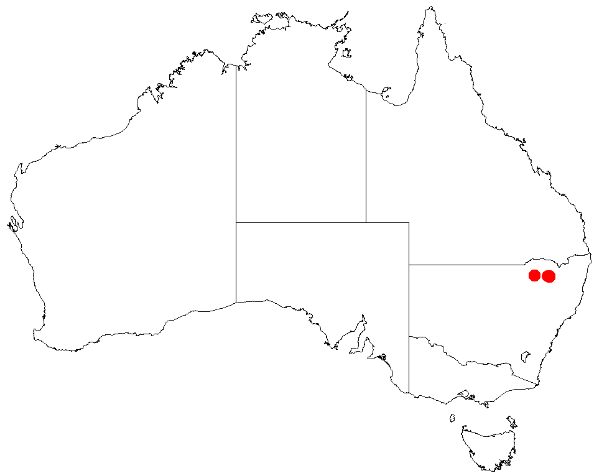
- Acacia atrox occurrence data from Australasian Virtual Herbarium

Synonyms
- Acacia atrox Kodela nom. inval.; Acacia sp. Myall Creek (Millar s.n. 25 May 2000); Racosperma atrox (Kodela) Pedley

= Acacia atrox =

Myall Creek wattle

Species of legume

Acacia atrox, commonly known as Myall Creek wattle, is a species of flowering plant in the family Fabaceae and is endemic to a small area in New South Wales. It is a dense, small shrub or tree that often forms suckers with sharply-pointed, more or less rigid, terete phyllodes, cream-coloured to pale yellow flowers arranged in a spherical head of 17 to 41 in axils.

== Description ==
Acacia atrox is a small shrub or tree that has a dense and multi-branched habit, typically grows to a height of 2–4 m (6 ft 7 in – 13 ft 1 in) and is able to spread and create thickets by suckering. Its phyllodes are sessile, cylindrical or 4-angled in cross section, 15–50 mm (0.59–1.97 in) long and 0.7–1.5 mm (0.028–0.059 in) wide with four to eight longitudinal veins and tapered to a sharply-pointed tip. The flowers are borne in spherical heads in a raceme with one or two branches on a peduncle 5–32 mm (0.20–1.26 in), each head 5–11 mm (0.20–0.43 in) wide containing 17 to 41 cream to pale yellow flowers. Flowering occurs from March to July, but fruit and seeds have not been recorded.

== Taxonomy ==
Acacia atrox was first formally described in 2001 by the botanist Phillip Gerhard Kodela in the journal Telopea from specimens collected on Myall Creek Station about 18 km (11 mi) south of Delungra in 2000. The specific epithet (atrox) means 'cruel, fierce, harsh, horrible, savage, or terrible', referring to the character of the plant, created by the prominent, sharply-pointed foliage.

In 2012, Lachlan Copeland and Phillip Kodela described Acacia atrox subsp. planiticola in a later edition of the journal Telopea, and its name, and that of the autonym are accepted by the Australian Plant Census:

- Acacia atrox Kodela subsp. atrox (the autonym) has the base of the phyllodes 2–6 mm (0.079–0.236 in) long with the tip 1.5–3.5 mm (0.059–0.138 in) long with 17 to 41 flowers in heads 5–11 mm (0.20–0.43 in) in diameter. Flowering has been recorded in May and July.
- Acacia atrox subsp. planiticola Kodela & L.M.Copel. has the base of the phyllodes 1.0–2.2 mm (0.039–0.087 in) long with the tip 0.7–2.2 mm (0.028–0.087 in) long with 17 to 25 flowers in heads 7–11 mm (0.28–0.43 in) in diameter. Flowering has been recorded in April and May.

The subspecies epithet (planiticola) means 'plains-dweller'.

== Distribution ==
Subspecies atrax has a limited distribution around the Inverell area in the north western slopes of New South Wales where it is found on slopes and low hills growing in clay soils over basalt, on basalt in cleared areas or as part of open well grassed Eucalyptus woodland communities. Subspecies planiticola is only known from a single population in Kirramingly Nature Reserve, 30 km (19 mi) south-south-west of Moree in a mosaic of natural grassland and grassy woodland.

== Conservation status ==
Acacia atrox is listed as "critically endangered" under the New South Wales Government Biodiversity Conservation Act 2016. The main threats to the species include loss of habitat through land clearing for agricultural development, herbivory, and stem damage of young regenerating plants from grazing animals, inappropriate fire regimes, and inadequate recruitment.

== Gallery ==
Acacia atrox ssp. planiticola in the Kirramingly Nature Reserve, near Gurley

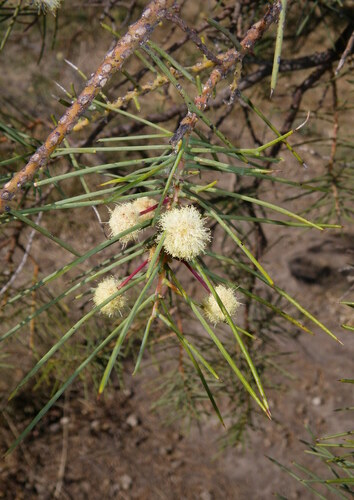

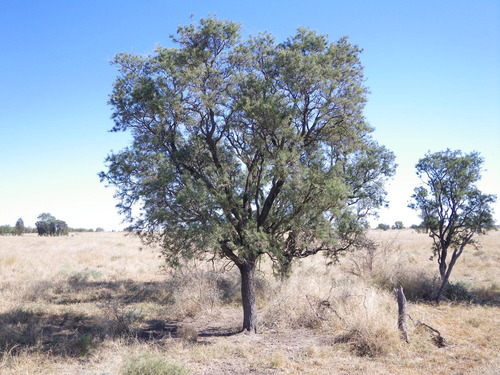

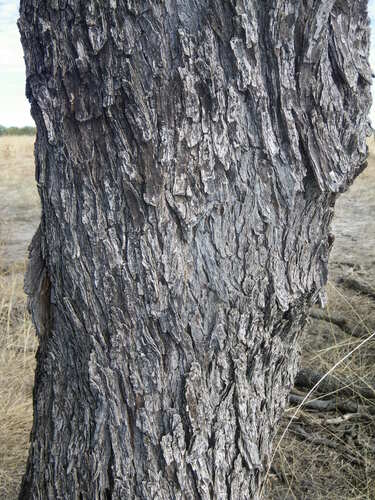

== See also ==
- List of Acacia species
