= Gwydir Wetlands =

Wetlands in New South Wales, Australia

Coordinates: 29°19′30″S 149°26′28″E

Designations

Ramsar Wetland
- Official name: Gwydir Wetlands: Gingham and Lower Gwydir Watercourses
- Designated: 14 June 1999
- Reference no.: 993

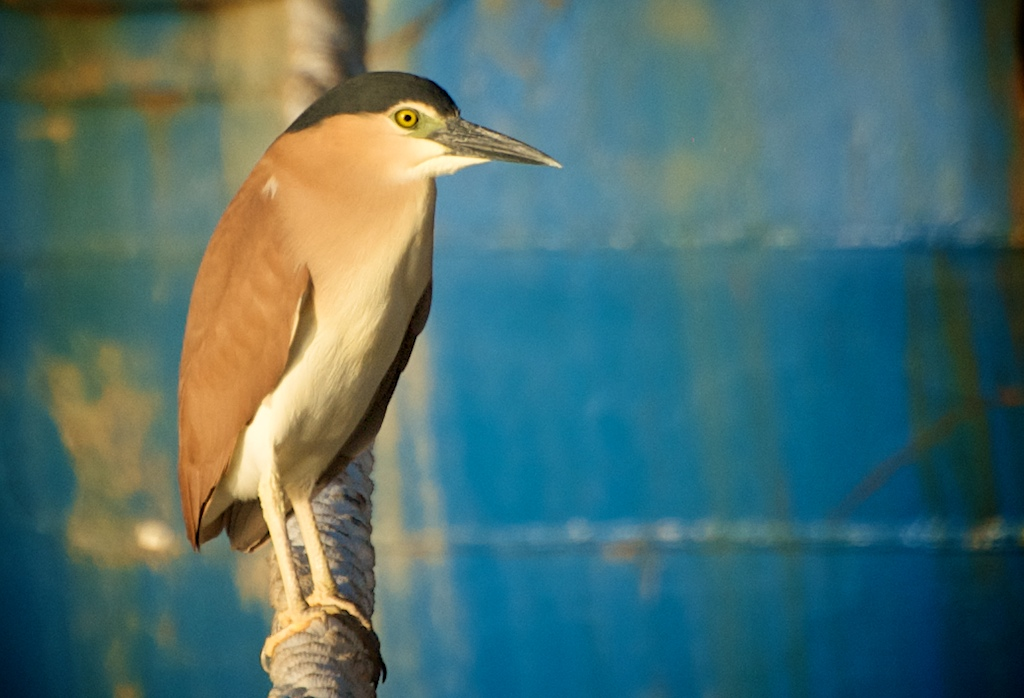
The Gwydir wetlands are an important site for nankeen night herons

The Gwydir Wetlands comprise a system of irregularly inundated wetlands associated with the Gwydir River in the North West Slopes region of north-eastern New South Wales, Australia. When flooded they form an important site for breeding waterbirds.

== Description ==
The wetlands lie between the towns of Moree and Mungindi in the Moree Plains Shire near the state border with Queensland. They consist of the inland floodplain of the Gwydir River that splits into the Gingham and Big Leather water courses and creating, when fully flooded, a 1021 km^{2} wetland some 45 km west of Moree. The extensive wetland area is a good example of an inland terminal delta. The floodwater extends for about 95 km through a series of natural and constructed channels and swamps. Once a closed system, since the building of the 1364 GL Copeton Dam, water flows have been controlled by the State Government water authorities to the detriment of the wetlands. Despite the consequent reduction of the wetland area from about 1000 km^{2} to 100 km^{2}, it is still one of the most significant waterbird breeding sites in Australia. The wetlands are contained in the pastoral properties of 'Lynworth' and 'Yarrol', and in parts of 'Boonoke' and 'Old Dromana', with the surrounding land being important as providing feeding habitat for waterbirds.

== Birds ==
The wetlands have been identified as an Important Bird Area (IBA) by BirdLife International because they support more breeding waterbirds than any other Australian site when they adequately flooded. Of more than half a million nesting waterbirds the wetlands may hold over 1% of the world populations of Australian white (up to 160,000 birds) and straw-necked ibises (up to 230,000), nankeen night herons (up to about 100,000) and intermediate egrets (up to about 45,000). Other waterbirds that have bred in the area in relatively large numbers include royal and yellow-billed spoonbills, little and great egrets, and glossy ibises. Australasian bitterns, Australian painted snipes and painted honeyeaters have been recorded.

== Ramsar site ==
Some 800 ha of the privately owned Gwydir wetlands were designated on 14 June 1999 as a Ramsar site as a wetland of international importance. The federal government bought the property, which was the largest privately owned wetlands in New South Wales, for A$10 million. The plan is to create a new national park as the wetlands provide habitat for 160 species of birds amongst four endangered ecological communities.
