= Pallamallawa =

Pallamallawa New South Wales
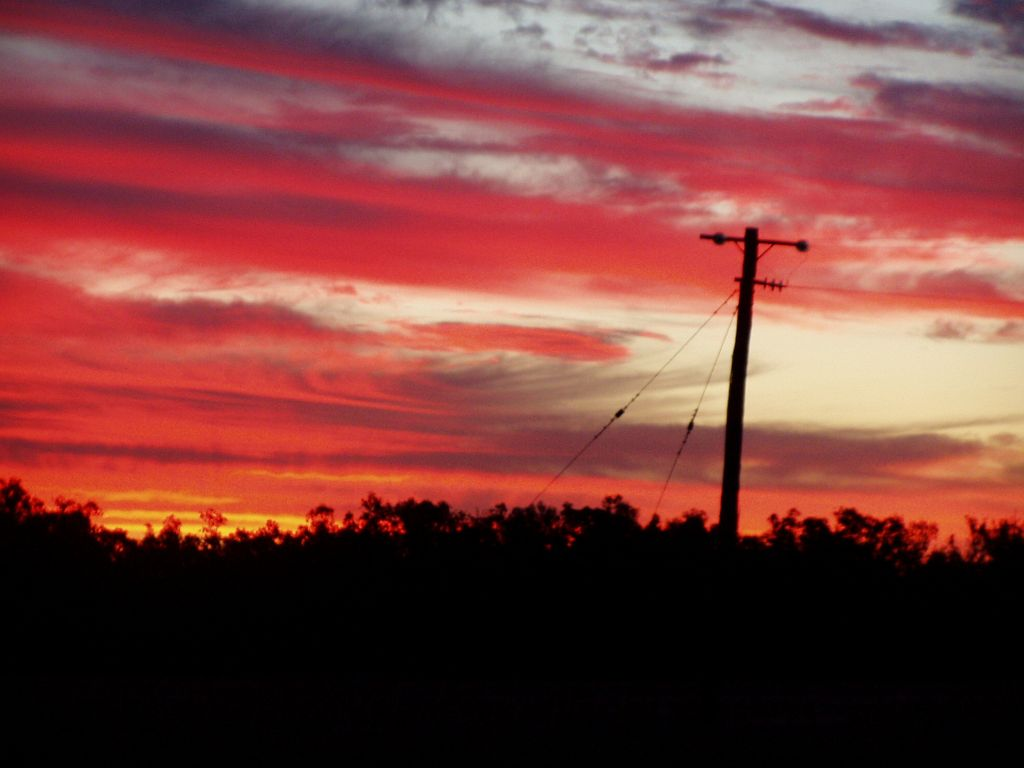
- Sunset in Pallamallawa

- Coordinates: 29°28′0″S 150°08′0″E
- Population: 253 (2011 census)
- Postcode(s): 2399
- Location: 637 km (396 mi) NW of Sydney; 241 km (150 mi) NW of Armidale; 32 km (20 mi) E of Moree
- LGA(s): Moree Plains Shire
- State electorate(s): Northern Tablelands
- Federal division(s): Parkes

Pallamallawa or "Pally" is a small rural village approximately 30 kilometres east of Moree, in north-western New South Wales, Australia. It is on the banks of the Gwydir River, two kilometres north of the Gwydir Highway between Inverell and Moree. At the 2011 census, Pallamallawa had a population of 253 people.

The village is a service centre for surrounding agricultural production. The majority of the population was Christian, with Anglicans accounting for nearly half of the population, followed by Catholics and Presbyterians. Around 30% of the population was studying non-school based qualifications. The unemployment rate was 4%.

The region's agriculture industries are diverse and include irrigated crops (such as cotton and pecans), as well as livestock (mostly beef cattle) and cropping (mostly cereals and rotational legumes). The pecan industry is now well established but growth in other novel crops, including olives, demonstrates a high level of innovation in agriculture.

Pallamallawa has a number of food and grocery service businesses, including a post office with banking facilities, a primary school, sporting amenities, a café/takeaway shop and a pub. The School's motto "Strive for Success" has been imparted on a number of famous Australians who have grown up in Pallamallawa, including poet Murray Hartin and light horseman Daniel Daley.
