= Mount Russell, New South Wales =

Mount Russell
- Town
- Coordinates: 29°40′40″S 150°55′50″E
- Country: Australia
- State: New South Wales
- LGA: Inverell Shire
- Location: 618 km (384 mi) N of Sydney; 457 km (284 mi) SW of Brisbane; 25 km (16 mi) NW of Inverell

Government
  - State electorate: Northern Tablelands
  - Federal division: New England
- Elevation: 246 m (807 ft)

Population
  - Total: 111 (SAL 2021)
- Postcode: 2360

Mount Russell is a village in Inverell Shire of New South Wales in Australia. In the 2006 census the village and surrounding area had a population of 237. The village is approximately 25 km (16 mi) north-west of Inverell, New South Wales and is approximately 618 km (384 mi) by road from the state capital Sydney.

A railway station on the Inverell branch opened on 10 March 1902, and was served by railmotors between Moree and Inverell. This section of the line was closed in 1987 and little trace remains of the station or platform, although some sidings are still intact. The sidings at Mount Russell also served a silo site constructed in 1934 with a storage capacity of 4,100 t (4,035 long tons; 4,519 short tons) with an additional 28,500 t (28,050 long tons; 31,416 short tons) storage added in 1955. The silo owned by GrainCorp was no longer in use as of 2007.

Preceding station	Former services	Following station
Delungra towards Moree	Inverell Line	Greenwood towards Inverell
