= Warialda Rail, New South Wales =

Warialda Rail New South Wales
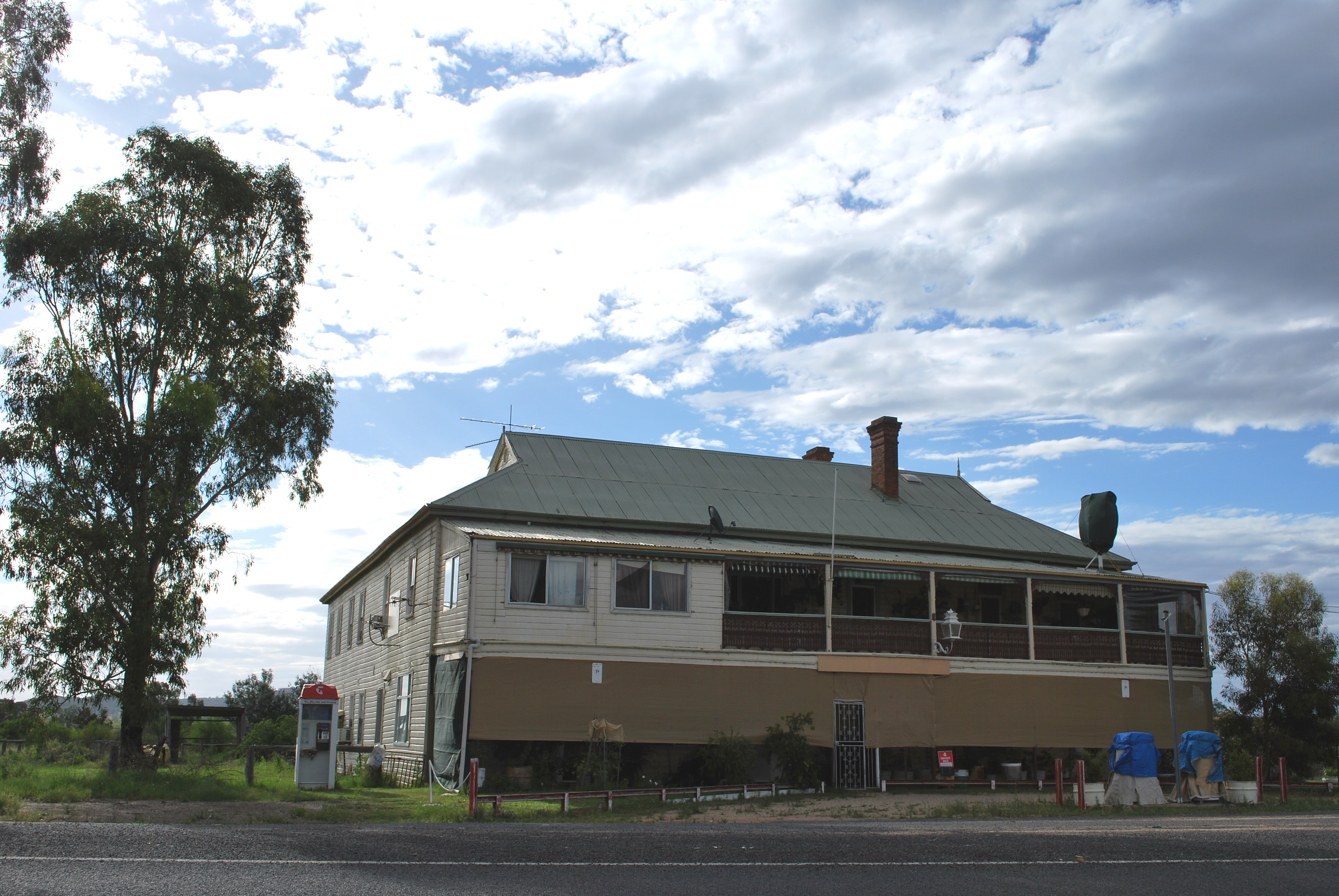
- The "Gully" Hotel, now closed at Warialda Rail

- Coordinates: 29°38′0″S 150°33′0″E
- Population: 182 (SAL 2021)
- Postcode(s): 2402
- Location: 581 km (361 mi) N of Sydney; 455 km (283 mi) SE of Brisbane; 82 km (51 mi) W of Moree; 7 km (4 mi) SW of Warialda
- LGA(s): Gwydir Shire
- State electorate(s): Northern Tablelands
- Federal division(s): New England

Warialda Rail is a town in the New England region of New South Wales, Australia. The town is located 3 km southwest of Warialda in the Gwydir Shire local government area, 581 kilometres (361 mi) north of the state capital, Sydney. At the 2006 census, Warialda Rail and the surrounding area had a population of 345.

The name of the local school and the area generally was originally Kelly's Gully, shortened by local residents to "the Gully". The Warialda railway station was located in the village. A recreation reserve was dedicated in the area in 1911 and, in 1913, an estate including allotments near the railway station and farming and grazing land was offered for sale.

Today the village consists of a former hotel, a cluster of houses and a railway yard.
