= Copeton Dam =

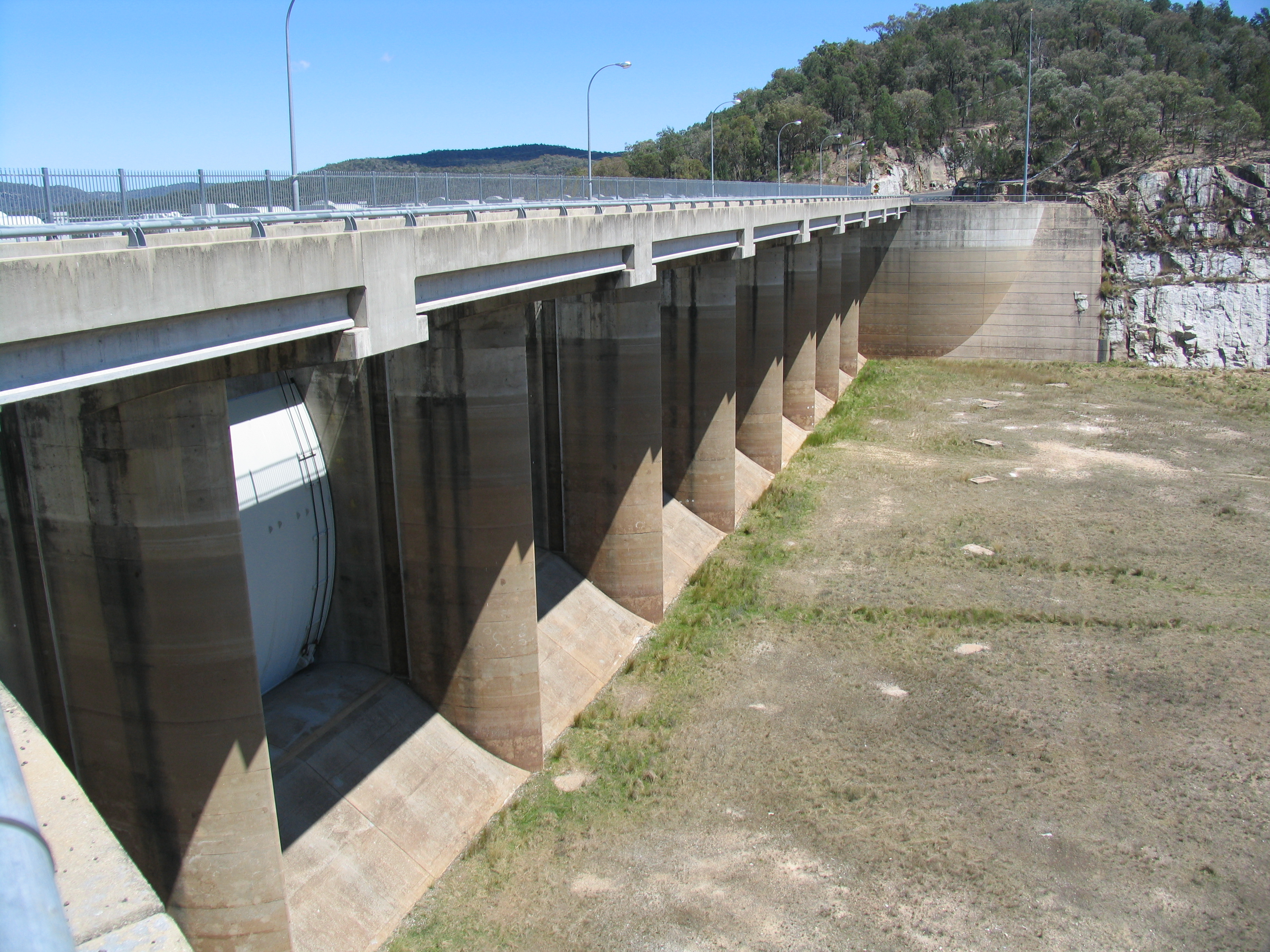
- Copeton Dam spillway, from the northern side looking west.

- Location of the Copeton Dam in New South Wales
- Location: New England, New South Wales, Australia
- Coordinates: 29°54′23″S 150°55′38″E
- Purpose: hydro-electric power generation, irrigation, and water supply
- Status: Operational
- Construction began: 1968
- Opening date: 1973
- Owner: WaterNSW

Dam and spillways
- Type of dam: Embankment dam
- Impounds: Gwydir River
- Height: 113 m (371 ft)
- Length: 1,484 m (4,869 ft)
- Width (crest): 10.7 m (35 ft)
- Dam volume: 8,547 m^{3} (301,800 cu ft)
- Spillway type: Gate-controlled concrete chute spillway
- Spillway capacity: 1,280,000 ML (45,000×10^{6} cu ft) per day

Reservoir
- Creates: Lake Copeton
- Total capacity: 1,364,000 ML (48,200×10^{6} cu ft)
- Catchment area: 5,360 km^{2} (2,070 sq mi)
- Surface area: 4,600 ha (11,000 acres)
- Maximum width: 427 m (1,401 ft)
- Maximum water depth: 104 m (341 ft)

Power Station
- Operator: AGL Energy
- Commission date: December 1996
- Type: Conventional
- Turbines: 1
- Installed capacity: 21 MW (28,000 hp)
- Annual generation: 54.3 GWh (195 TJ)
- Website; Copeton Dam at www.statewater.com.au

Copeton Dam is a major clay core and rock fill embankment dam with nine radial gates and a gated concrete chute spillway across the Gwydir River upstream of Bingara in the New England region of New South Wales, Australia. The dam's purpose includes environmental flows, hydro-electric power generation, irrigation, and water supply. The impounded reservoir is called Lake Copeton.

== Location and features ==
Commenced in March 1968, commissioned in 1973, and completed in 1976, the Copeton Dam is a major dam on the Gwydir River, a tributary of the Barwon River, and is located approximately 35 kilometres (22 mi) southwest of Inverell, between Bingara and Bundarra. The dam was built by the New South Wales Water Conservation & Irrigation Commission and the Department of Water Resources to supply water for irrigation. Water from the dam is now released directly into the Gwydir River which is used by irrigators downstream of the dam including for pecan nut farming, and for producing cotton, wheat, lucerne, vegetables, fruit trees, oil seeds and fodder as well as pastures for sheep and cattle. The dam wall comprises 8,547 cubic metres (301,800 cu ft) of rock fill and is 113 metres (371 ft) high and is 1,484 metres (4,869 ft) long. The maximum water depth is 104 metres (341 ft) and at 100% capacity the dam wall holds back 1,364,000 megalitres (48,200×10^{6} cu ft) of water at 572 metres (1,877 ft) AHD. The surface area of Lake Copeton is 4,620 hectares (11,400 acres) and the catchment area is 2,360 square kilometres (910 sq mi). The gate-controlled concrete chute spillway is capable of discharging 1,280,000 megalitres (45,000×10^{6} cu ft) of water per day.

Together with a series of diversionary weirs and regulatory works downstream from the dam, Copeton is able to provide a reliable flow of water to 30,000 hectares (74,000 acres) of land. This amount is much less than the 50,000 hectares (120,000 acres) originally planned because of higher rates of absorption and evaporation along some of the irrigation channels. Despite these overestimates irrigated agriculture in the Gwydir Valley saw the area become Australia's major cotton-producing region.

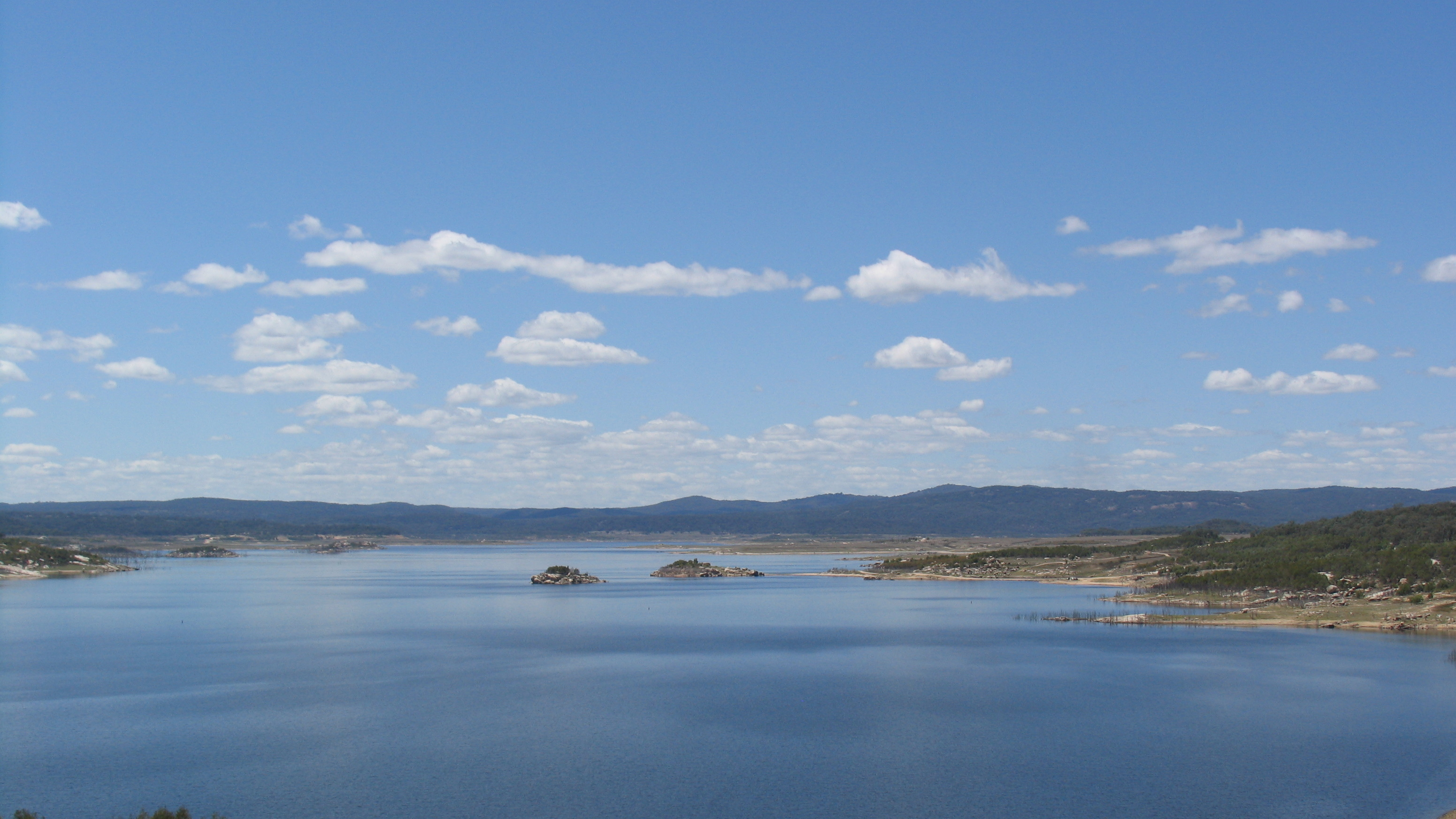
View of the storage in Copeton Dam in October 2006

=== Upgrade of facilities ===
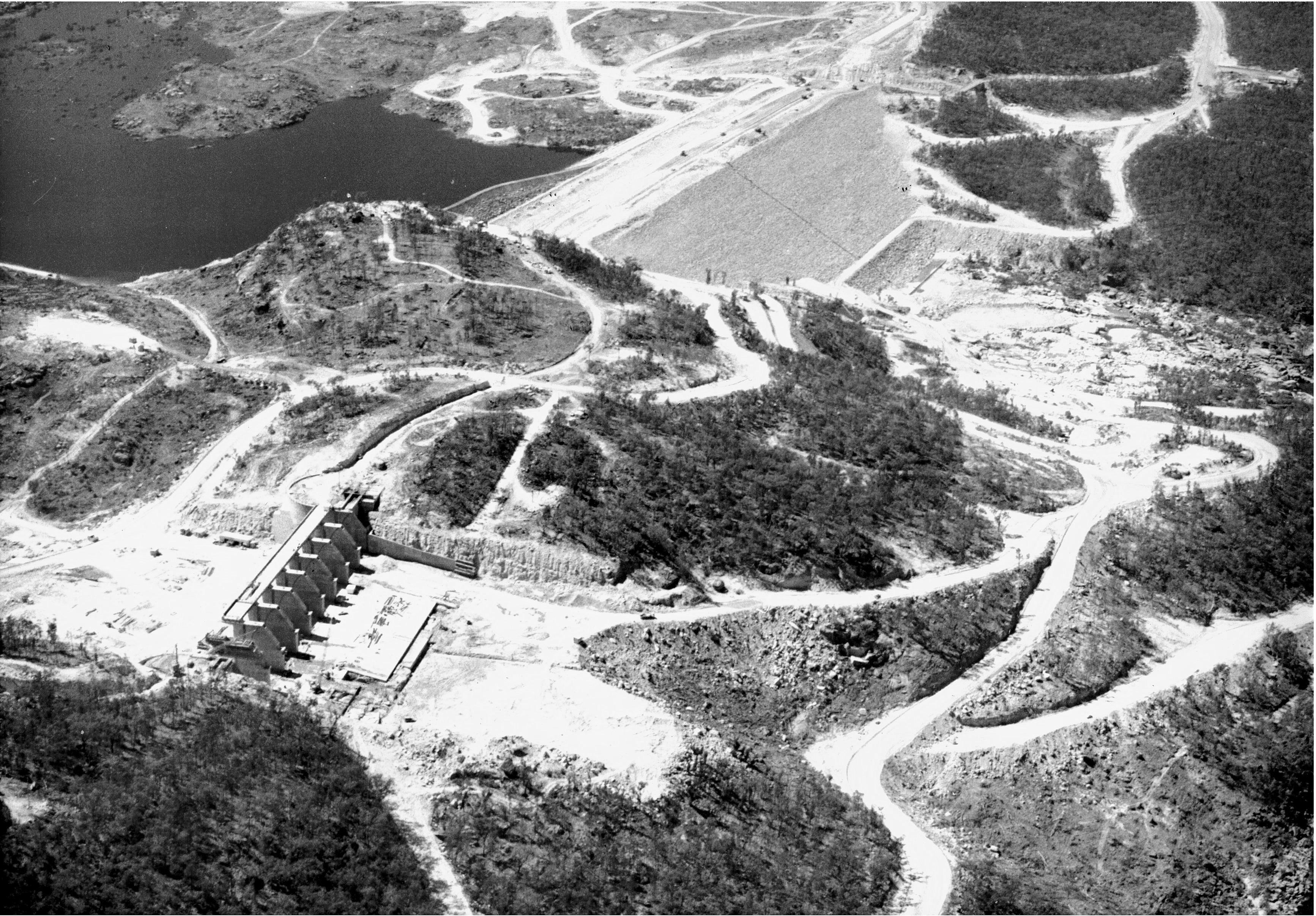
Aerial photograph of Copeton Dam under construction in 1972

In 2007, it was decided the dam would need an upgrade for safety reasons. The A$70 million upgrade is expected to be completed during 2013 and Stage One involves the construction of a four-bay, 250-metre (820 ft)-wide, fuse plug spillway at Diamond Bay to enable the dam to safely pass extreme floods. Once the fuse plug is installed the dam wall will be raised and the spillway gate modified.

==== Spillway ====
Unexpected erosion of hard, sound, unweathered granite in the unlined spillway discharge channel was caused by rock failure under high in-situ compressive stress. This type of erosion due to high in-situ stress has not been reported elsewhere in the world.

Remedial works involved building a training wall to separate the original single spillway into a service spillway and a secondary (emergency) spillway. A concrete slab, anchored to the underlying rock was constructed in the floor of the main scour channel to provide some additional protection on those rare occasions when the secondary spillway will discharge water over this area. The smaller, more frequent flood events will be discharged through the service spillway onto more scour resistant rock which has performed satisfactorily to date. The secondary spillway will operate very infrequently and will only discharge when the capacity of the service spillway is exceeded.

Geological investigations for the design of these remedial works included surface stress measurements in the unlined spillway discharge channel as well as geological mapping and diamond core drilling.

=== Power generation ===
A hydro-electric power station generates up to 21 megawatts (28,000 hp) of electricity from the flow of the water leaving Copeton Dam with an average annual output of 54.3 gigawatt-hours (195 TJ). The station was completed in December 1996. The facility is managed by AGL Energy.

== Recreation ==
Copeton Dam offers sailing, windsurfing, boating, water skiing, fishing and swimming while bushwalkers can enjoy unusual geological formations, lake and mountain views and a wide variety of plant life.

== See also ==
- Irrigation in Australia
- List of dams and reservoirs in Australia
