= Inverell railway line =

Closed railway line in New South Wales, Australia

The Inverell railway line is a closed railway line in New South Wales, Australia. The line branches from the Mungindi line at Moree and travels in an easterly direction through the town of Gravesend then Warialda Rail, gradually increasing in elevation through Delungra towards the terminus at Inverell. An initial estimate of its intended length was 96 miles 35 chains (155.2 km). The line opened in February 1900 as far as Gravesend, then more of the line in 1901 before the Gwydir River bridge was finally finished and the line completed in 1902. It was progressively closed between 1987 and 1994. Currently a 5 km (3.1 mi) section at the Moree end remains in use as a siding for the storage of railway wagons. On 8 August 2016, The NSW Government announced that a 2.8km section of the railway would be reinstated to allow grain to be sent by rail, as part of the Fixing Country Rail pilot round. Up to $2 million was allocated for the project.

== History ==
An unsuccessful proposal by the mayor of Inverell, James H Hindmarsh was first made in 1872 to construct a railway from Tamworth to the town via Manilla, Barraba and Bingara with the possibility of extending further north to the Queensland border. However, in 1876 the New South Wales parliament approved the construction of a Tamworth to Armidale line which would later extend to the border.

In 1894 surveying of a line linking Moree and Inverell began, and the Parliamentary Committee for Public Works recommended it be constructed in 1897. Construction of the first section between Moree and Gravesend commenced in June 1898, opening 1 February 1900. Construction was delayed in May 1900 when the two steel spans of 180 ft (55 m) for the bridge across the Gwydir River near Gravesend, the most significant bridge on the line, did not arrive from England on time.

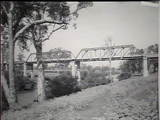
Gwydir River railway bridge near Gravesend

By the end of 1901, earthworks were completed along the length of the line and a timber trestle bridge across Warialda Creek was nearing completion. The section between Gravesend and Delungra officially opened with the Gwydir River bridge on 25 November 1901, and the final section between Delungra and Inverell on 10 March 1902.

Travelling time for passengers between Sydney and Inverell by rail in 1904 was over twenty four hours. In 1910, major flooding destroyed a bridge near Warialda, closing the line for three days until repairs could be completed.

Goods traffic carried on the line during its operation was primarily livestock and grain. Several silos, stock loading facilities and associated sidings are still evident along the overgrown alignment. Passenger services were mostly provided by railmotors and ran to timetables which connected with the daily North West Mail train from Sydney to Moree. By the 1970s, the passenger services ran four times a week while goods trains operated on the line each weekday. Petroleum products were also likely carried on the line, evidenced by Shell Oil Company company sidings at Warialda station.

Passenger services between Inverell and Moree ceased in 1983. Many smaller stations had closed prior to this date due to declining passenger numbers. The final train from Inverell yard ran on 22 June 1987, and the line beyond Delungra was decommissioned on 2 December 1987. In August 1991, the line was further truncated to Biniguy, with the final section closed on 14 June 1994 and the line listed as out of use beyond a short siding from the junction with the Mungindi line, just south of Moree station. The bridge across the Gwydir River near Gravesend has been listed as a heritage item since 1999.

== Proposed branches ==
In 1927 the New South Wales parliament passed legislation entitled Inverell to Ashford Railway Act 1927 No 27 to enable the construction of a 32 mi (51 km) branch line from a point near the Inverell station to the town of Ashford. The total cost to construct this line was estimated at £262,000. Construction was never started.

Legislation was also passed in the form of the Glen Innes to Inverell Railway Act 1950 No 7 to allow for the construction of a 50 mi (80 km) link to extend the Moree to Inverell line as far as Glen Innes to connect with the Main Northern line. The estimated cost of construction was £3 million. It was intended that the extended line could function as a quicker route to ports in the Mid North Coast and Northern Rivers regions via the incomplete Guyra to Dorrigo railway.

== Potential re-use ==
In 2011, the Regional Development Australia Committee - Northern Inland New South Wales backed feasibility studies based on a proposal to reopen and extend the line beyond Inverell to a new export port facility to be located near Iluka or Coffs Harbour. The estimated cost for such a link is approximately A$6 billion. Traffic on the line would be mostly coal from deposits in the Gunnedah Basin and function as an alternative to congested ports in Sydney and Newcastle.
