= Russell Mountain =

Summit in Iron County in the U.S. state of Missouri

- Location within Missouri

Highest point
- Elevation: 1,726 ft (526 m)
- Coordinates: 37°34′23″N 90°41′43″W

Geography
- Location: Iron County, Missouri, U.S.
- Parent range: Saint Francois Mountains
- Topo map: USGS Ironton

Russell Mountain is a summit in Iron County in the U.S. state of Missouri. The mountain lies just east of Taum Sauk Mountain and Missouri Route CC provides access to the two peaks from combined Missouri routes 21 and 72 to the east. The town of Ironton is about six miles to the northeast. The Tom Sauk Trail traverses the Russell Mountain ridge.

Russell Mountain most likely has the name of Giles Russell, a businessperson in the local mining industry.

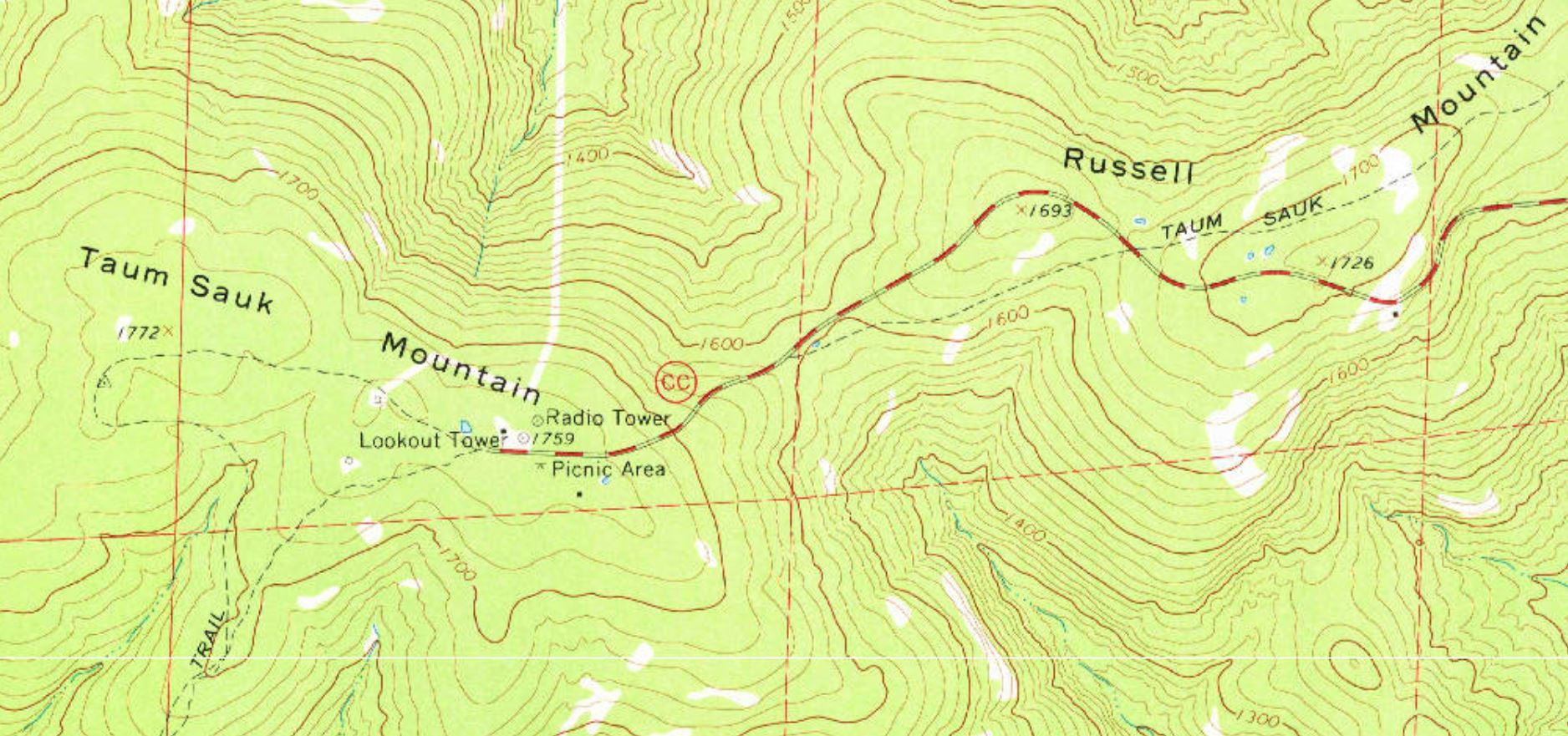
USGS topographic map of the Taum Sauk and Russell Mountain area
