= Gwydir River =

River in New South Wales, Australia

Coordinates: 30°S 151°E

Gwydir River Guida, Big Bundarra River, Bundara River, Big River, Rocky River
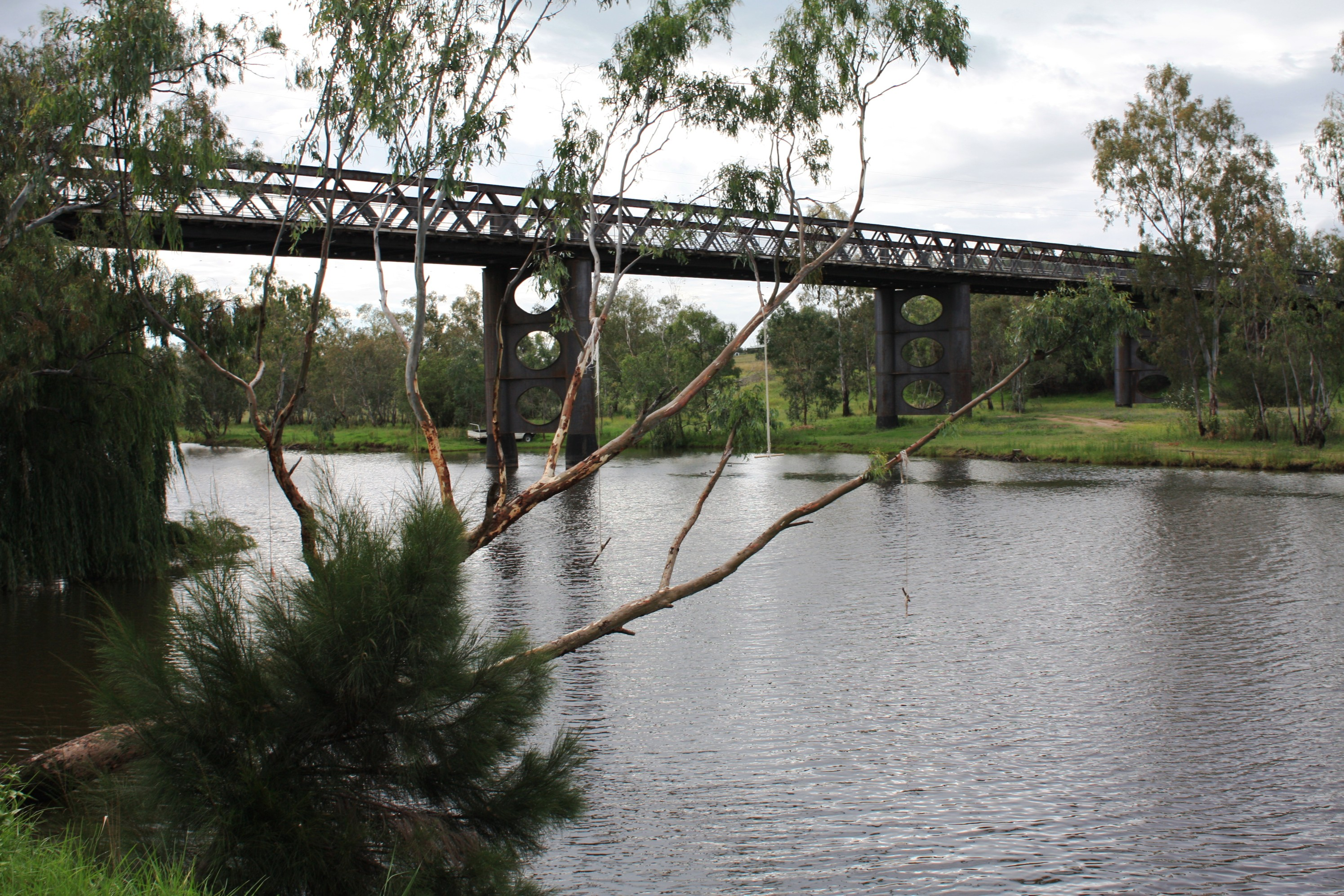
- Gwydir River, near Bingara
- Etymology: In honour of Lord Gwydir

Location
- Country: Australia
- State: New South Wales
- IBRA: Northern Tablelands
- District: New England, North West Slopes, Orana
- Municipalities: Uralla, Gwydir, Moree Plains, Walgett

Physical characteristics
- Source: Rocky River
  - location: at Yarrowyck, near Uralla
  - elevation: 760 m (2,490 ft)
- 2nd source: Boorolong Creek
- Source confluence: Mehi River
  - location: near Moree
  - elevation: 202 m (663 ft)
- Mouth: confluence with the Barwon River
  - location: north east of Collarenebri
  - elevation: 144 m (472 ft)
- Length: 488 km (303 mi)
- Basin size: 26,588 km^{2} (10,266 sq mi)
- Discharge
  - average: 26 m^{3}/s (920 cu ft/s)

Basin features
- River system: Barwon River, Murray–Darling basin
- Tributaries
  - left: Horton River
  - right: Moredun Creek
- Reservoirs: Lake Copeton, Collymongle Lagoon

Gwydir River /ɡwaɪdər/ (locally [gwɑe̯də]), a major inland perennial river of the Barwon catchment within the Murray–Darling basin, is located in the Northern Tablelands, North West Slopes, and Orana districts of New South Wales, Australia.

The river rises at the junction of the Rocky River and Boorolong Creek, at Yarrowyck, northwest of Uralla and flows generally northwest and west, joined by over thirty-four tributaries, including the Horton and Mehi rivers, before reaching its confluence with the Barwon River, north east of Collarenebri, descending 616 metres (2,021 ft) over its 488-kilometre (303 mi) course.

The flow of the river is impounded by Copeton Dam, with storage used for town water supply, stock, domestic use and irrigation. The Gwydir River below Copeton Dam provides some of the wildest whitewater rafting available in Australia. Before the construction of Copeton Dam and much diversionary work, the Gwydir River flowed into the Gingham and Lower Gwydir Wetlands.

The Gwydir Highway was named after the river.

== Geography ==
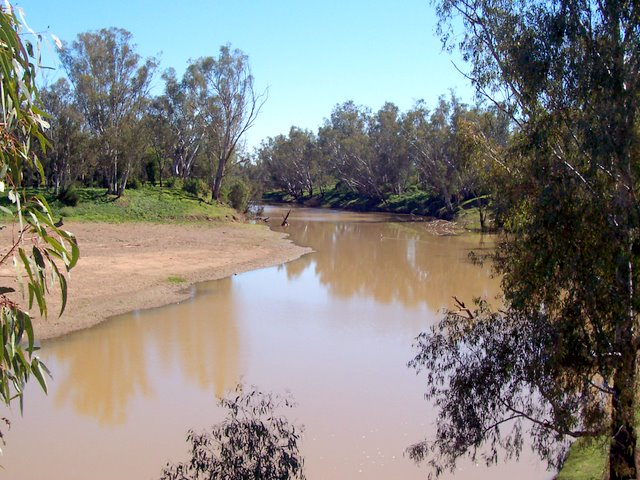
Gwydir River, near Moree

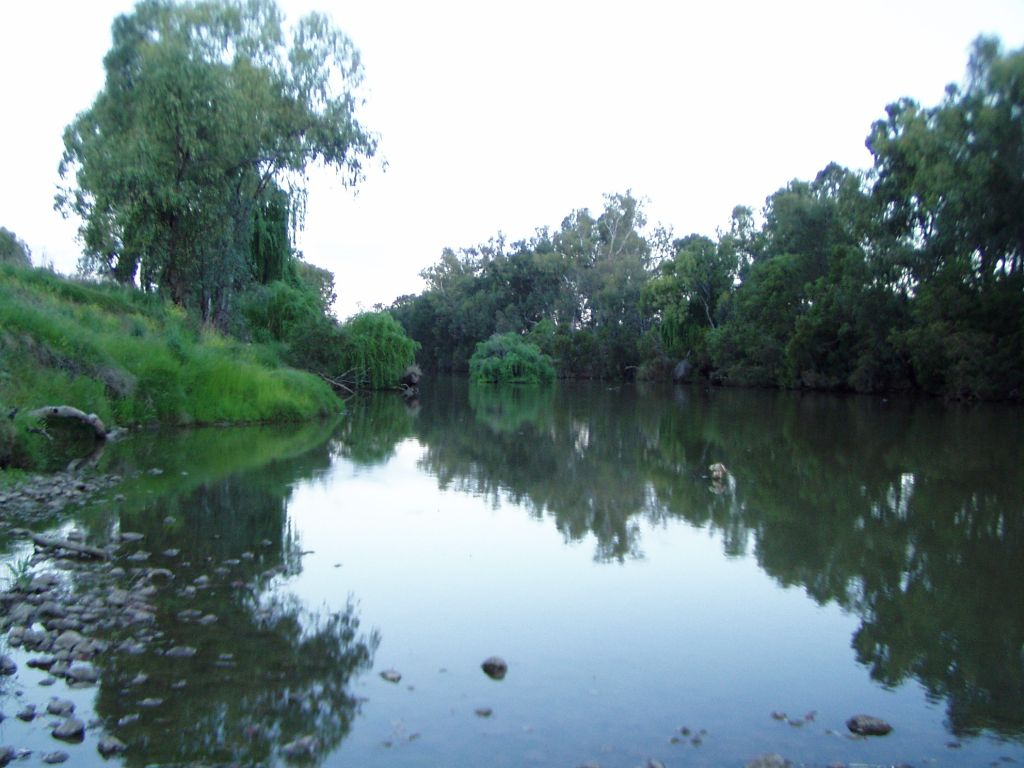
Gwydir River, downstream from Pallamallawa

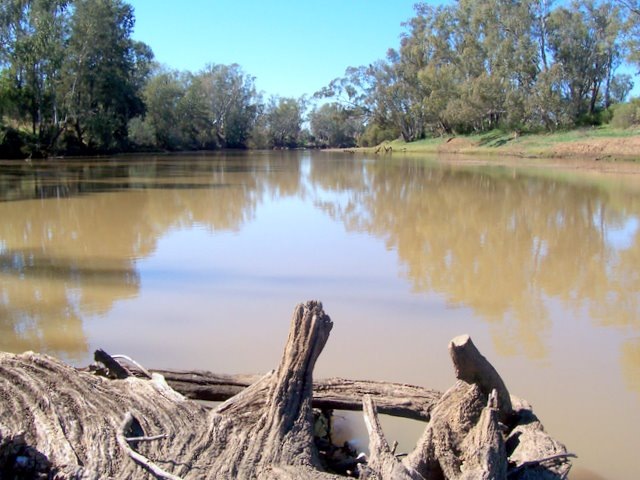
Gwydir River, near Moree

The Gwydir river rises on the southern part of the Northern Tablelands, near the town of Uralla, and flows about 668 km (415 mi) generally north west and then west onto the plains where it branches somewhat, eventually joining the Barwon River, mostly as its main branch the Mehi River, which branches off to the east of Moree, before passing through it. The upper Gwydir River also passes the towns of Bundarra, Bingara, Gravesend, and Pallamallawa. Further distributaries above Moree are the Carole which then joins with the GilGil Creek to the north that flow into the Barwon River when during times of high rainfall/runoff or water deliveries.

The Gwydir River further splits into two anabranch west of Moree – the Lower Gwydir or "Big Leather Watercourse" is the southern channel, and the "Gingham Channel" is the northern branch. The Gingham Channel flows west and becomes undefined in wetlands and floodplains around west of Moree. Only in larger flood events does it then join with the Ballone Creek before it flows into the Barwon River. The Big Leather Watercourse then also loses definition in wetlands and floodplains to the west and only larger floods joins with the Barwon River to the west. In turn, the Mehi River joins the Barwon River near the town of Collarenebri.

Over its entire distance, the Gwydir River falls around 616 metres (2,021 ft) in elevation from its headwaters, at an elevation of 760 metres (2,490 ft) above sea level to when it joins the Barwon River at an elevation of 144 metres (472 ft) above sea level. The Gwydir River's total length is 488 kilometres (303 mi), in which space and thirty-four tributaries feed into it over its entire length; including the Horton River, Warialda Creek, Laura Creek and Moredun Creek.

== History ==
The traditional custodians of the land surrounding the Gwydir River were the Aboriginal Kamilaroi peoples.

Explorer Allan Cunningham crossed the river at Gravesend in 1827 and named it after his patron, Peter Burrell, Baron Gwydyr, who took his title from Gwydir Castle in Wales (Welsh pronunciation: [ˈɡwɨdir]). The Commonwealth Electoral Division of Gwydir, which was created in 1901 and ceased to exist at the 2007 federal election, was named for the Gwydir River. In Australia, unlike in Welsh, the name is pronounced to rhyme with "wider".

The iron lattice bridges crossing the Gwydir River at Bundarra and Bingara are regarded as significant bridges of the colonial period. Around mid-1838 a war of extirpation, according to local magistrate Edward Denny Day, was waged all along the Gwydir River. Aborigines in the district were repeatedly pursued by parties of mounted and armed stockmen and Day claimed that great numbers of them had been killed at various spots.

== Agriculture ==
A lot of irrigated cotton is grown near Moree, as well as many other crops, livestock and agricultural enterprises. The cotton industry relies on irrigation and has been affected by recent drought with water allocations to farms severely reduced. In 2006 it was calculated that the cotton industry consumed 87% of the agricultural water taken from the Gwydir River.

Irrigation in the upper Gwydir led to a severe reduction in natural flows downstream. The reduction in water flow has affected landholders who traditionally grazed on wetlands and floodplains and in areas where the waters from the river were used to supplement stock drinking water and for minor watering of pasture and small areas of crops. It also reduced or stopped periodical flushes of water into ephemeral creeks, watercourses and wetlands in the Gingham, Lower Gwydir and Mallowa and other smaller systems. These conflicts resulted in the establishment of the Gwydir Regulated River Management Committee in 1997 and then the Gwydir Environmental Contingency Allowance Operation Advisory Committee when the Gwydir Water Sharing Plan came into effect on 1 July 2004.

== Environment ==
=== Wetlands ===
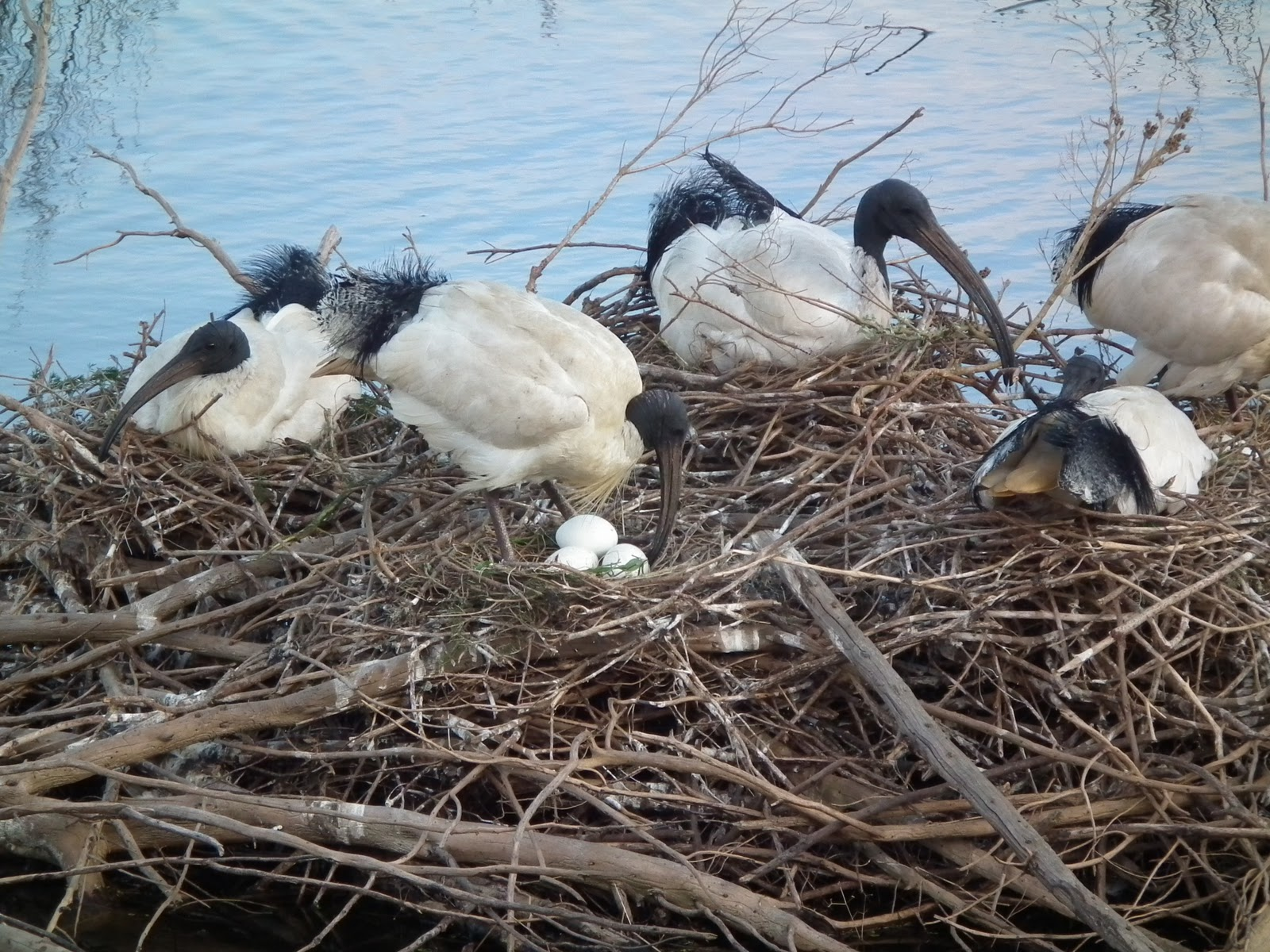
The Gwydir wetlands are an important breeding site for Australian white ibises

Some 800 hectares (2,000 acres) of the privately owned Gwydir Wetlands were designated on 14 June 1999 as a Ramsar site as a wetland of international importance.

Some 1,021 square kilometres (394 sq mi) of the Gwydir Wetlands have been identified by BirdLife International as an Important Bird Area because, when they receive adequate water inflows, they support more breeding waterbirds than any other site in the country. At times more than half a million nesting waterbirds have been present, including over 1% of the world populations of nankeen night herons, intermediate egrets, and of white and straw-necked ibises. The endangered Australasian bittern, black-necked stork and other threatened species have been recorded.

The Namoi River snapping turtle or Bell's turtle (Elseya belli) is found only in the upper reaches of the Namoi, Gwydir and Macdonald Rivers on the NSW North West Slopes.

== See also ==
- List of rivers of Australia
- Rivers of New South Wales
