= Gwydir Highway =

Highway in New South Wales, Australia

Gwydir Highway New South Wales
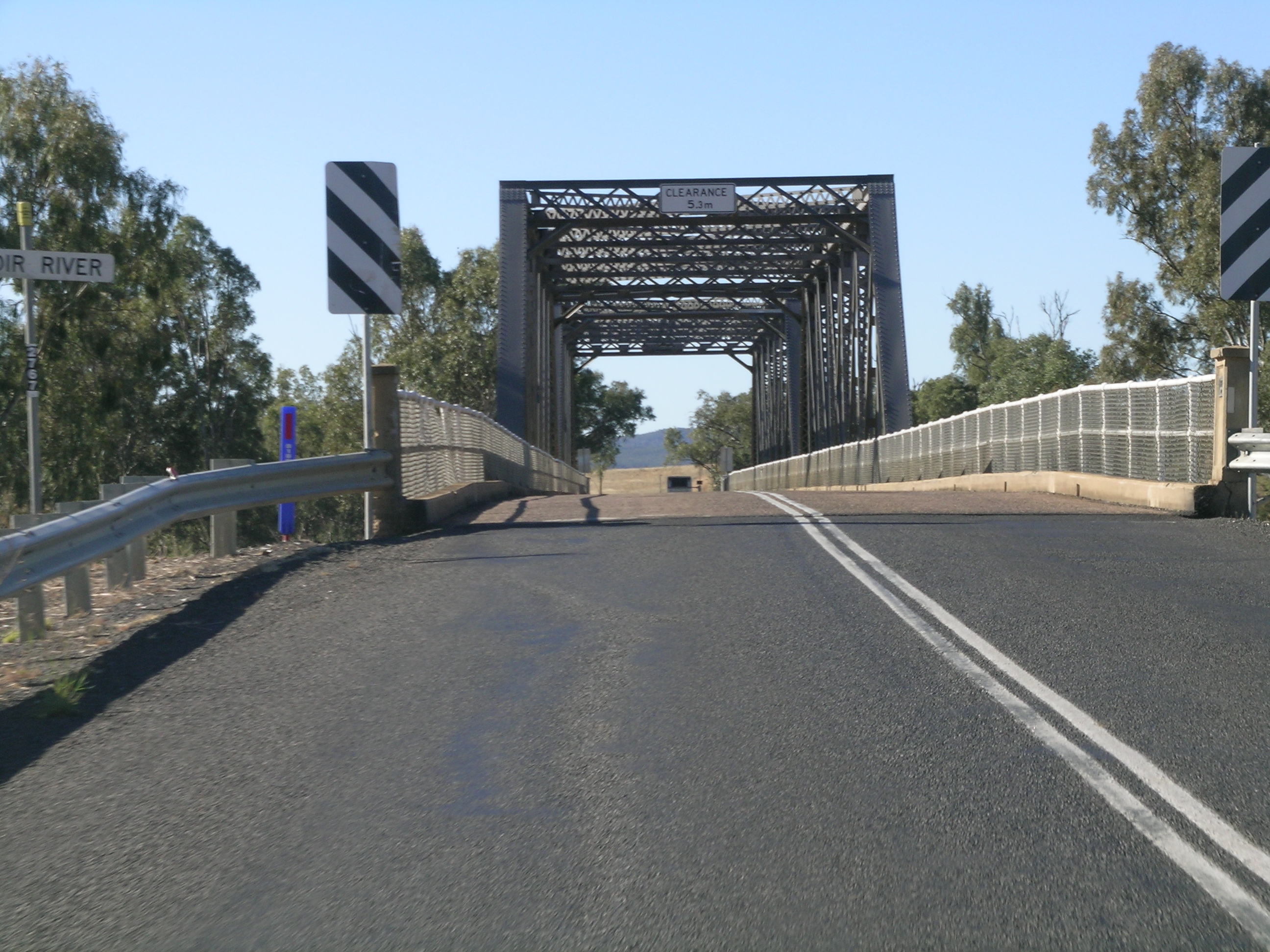
- The Gwydir River Bridge on the highway at Gravesend.

General information
- Type: Highway
- Length: 568 km (353 mi)
- Gazetted: August 1928
- Route number(s): B76 (2013–present)
- Former route number: National Route 38 (1962–2013)

Major junctions
- West end: Castlereagh Highway; Walgett, New South Wales
- Newell Highway; Fossickers Way; New England Highway
- East end: Big River Way; Grafton, New South Wales

Location(s)
- Major settlements: Collarenebri, Moree, Warialda, Inverell, Glen Innes

Highway system
- Highways in Australia; National Highway • Freeways in Australia; Highways in New South Wales

Gwydir Highway is a 568-kilometre (353 mi) state highway in northern New South Wales, Australia. The highway was named after the Gwydir River, which in turn was named after a locale in Wales.

== Route ==
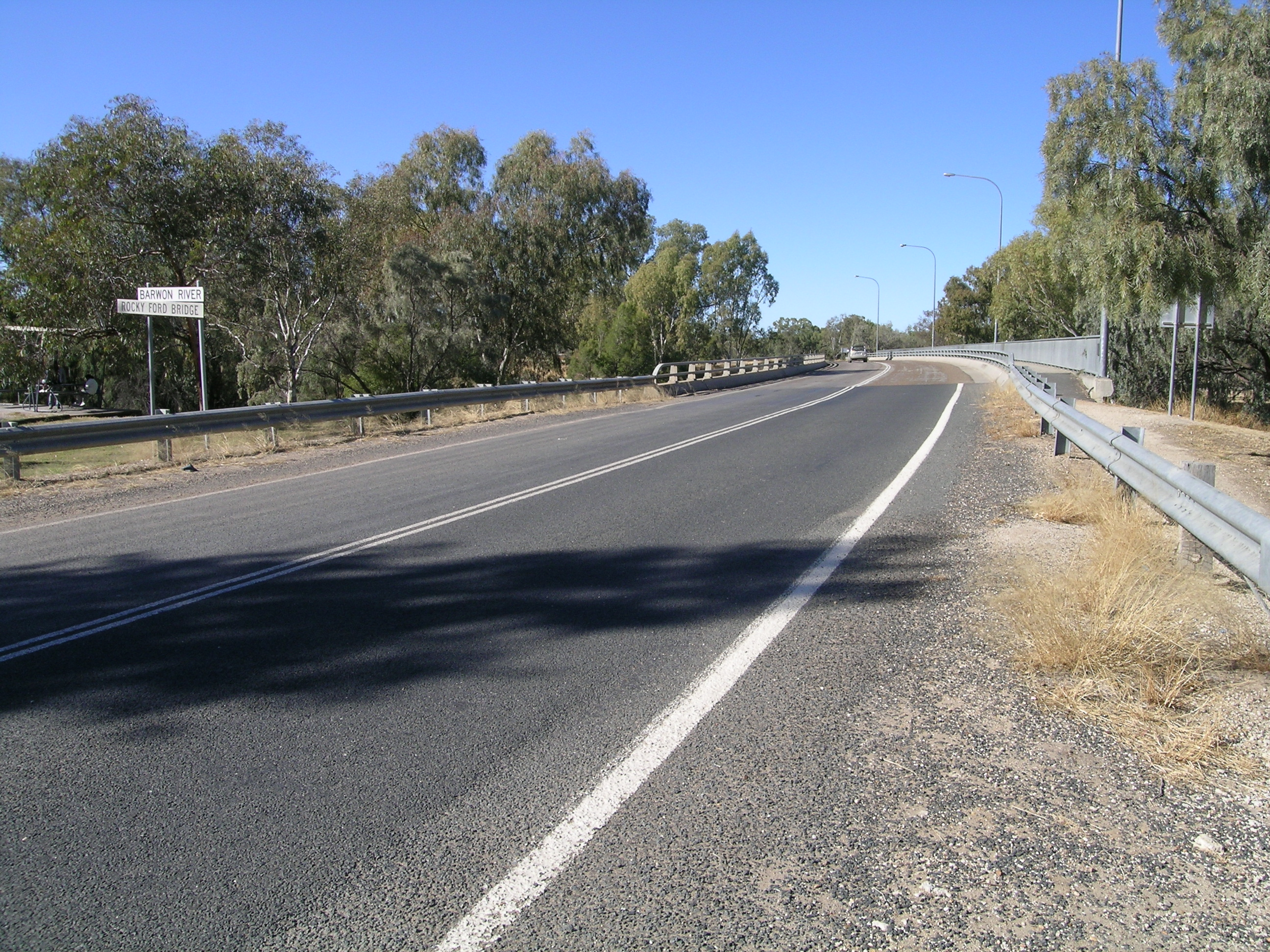
Rocky Ford Bridge on the highway over the Barwon River at Collarenebri

Gwydir Highway traverses the New England region from the inland plains to the coastal region, linking Walgett, Collarenebri, Moree, Warialda, Inverell, Glen Innes and Grafton. The western termination of the highway is at the junction with Castlereagh Highway, 14 kilometres (8.7 mi) north of Walgett.

At Moree it intersects the Newell Highway. At Inverell, it has an intersection with Thunderbolts Way. At Glen Innes it intersects New England Highway. At South Grafton on the Clarence River, it joins Big River Way and Summerland Way. Between Glen Innes and South Grafton, Gwydir Highway runs between the Gibraltar Range and Washpool National Parks.

== History ==
The passing of the Main Roads Act of 1924 through the Parliament of New South Wales provided for the declaration of Main Roads, roads partially funded by the State government through the Main Roads Board (later Transport for NSW). Gwydir Highway was declared (as Main Road No. 12) from the intersection with North Coast Highway (today Pacific Highway) in South Grafton, via Buccarumbi, Glen Innes, Inverell, Moree to the crossing of the Barwon River at Mogil Mogil, and Main Road No. 68 was declared along its future alignment from Walgett via Collarenabri to Mogil Mogil (and continuing northwards to the state border with Queensland, and westwards via Brewarrina, Bourke, Louth, Wilcannia, Menindee, Pooncarrie and Wentworth to the state border with South Australia) on the same day, 8 August 1928. With the passing of the Main Roads (Amendment) Act of 1929 to provide for additional declarations of State Highways and Trunk Roads, these were amended to State Highway 12 and Trunk Road 68 on 8 April 1929. In late 1929, the western end was amended to terminate via Grawan Bridge at Collarenebri instead.

In December 1960, a 160-kilometre deviation between Glen Innes and Grafton via Jackadgery opened, with the old road via Buccarumbi renamed Old Glen Innes Road.

The passing of the Roads Act of 1993 updated road classifications and the way they could be declared within New South Wales. Under this act, the western end of Gwydir Highway (as State Highway 12) was extended from Collarenabri to the intersection with Castlereagh Highway north of Walgett, subsuming the former alignment of Main Road 68 (formerly Trunk Road 68, officially splitting it into a western section terminating at Walgett, and an eastern section terminating in Collarenabri), on 17 December 1993. When Pacific Highway's Grafton bypass opened in May 2020, Gwydir Highway (as Highway 12) was officially extended east along the old alignment of Pacific Highway to Tyndale, on 5 July 2022, although the road is known locally and sign-posted as Big River Way. Gwydir Highway today, as part of Highway 12, still retains this declaration.

The highway was allocated National Route 38 in 1962, from Grafton to Collarenebri, later extended with the highway to north of Walgett in 1993. With New South Wales' conversion to the newer alphanumeric system in 2013, this was replaced with route B76 across the whole highway.

== Major junctions ==
LGA	Location	km	mi	Destinations	Notes
Walgett	Walgett	0	0.0	Castlereagh Highway (B55 north, B55/B76 south) – Walgett, Lightning Ridge, Coonamble, Gilgandra	Western terminus of highway Route B76 continues south along Castlereagh Highway
Walgett	Collarenebri	60	37	Herbert Street (north) – Collarenebri; Wilson Street (east) – Mungindi, Collarenebri Airport	4-way intersection
Barwon River		61	38	Rocky Ford Bridge	
Moree Plains	Moree	200	120	Heber Street (east) – Moree; Balo Street (south) – Moree	4-way intersection
Moree Plains	Moree	201	125	Carnarvon Highway – Mungindi, St George	T-intersection
Moree Plains	Moree	202	126	Moree Bypass (Newell Highway) (A39 north) – Goondiwindi	Northern terminus of concurrency with route A39 at T-intersection
Mehi River		203	126	Doctor Geoffrey Hunter Bridge	
Moree Plains	Moree	204	127	Moree Bypass (Newell Highway) (A39 south) – Narrabri, Gilgandra, Dubbo	Southern terminus of concurrency with route A39
Moree Plains	Moree	205	127	Mungindi railway line	
Gwydir River		259	161	Gwydir River Bridge	
Gwydir	Warialda	279	173	Allan Cunningham Road (Fossickers Way) (B95) – Bingara, Barraba, Tamworth	
Gwydir	Warialda	281	175	Warialda Road – Yetman	
Macintyre River		341	212	Bridge over the river (bridge name unknown)	
Inverell	Inverell	342	213	Byron Street – Inverell, Ashford	Roundabout
Inverell	Inverell	343	213	Tingha Road (Thunderbolts Way) – Uralla, Walcha, Gloucester	
Glen Innes Severn	Glen Innes	409	254	Church Street (New England Highway) (A15 north) – Stanthorpe, Warwick	Concurrency with route A15
Glen Innes Severn	Glen Innes	409	254	Church Street (New England Highway) (A15 south) – Armidale, Tamworth, Newcastle	Concurrency with route A15
Beardy Waters		415	258	Bridge over the river (bridge name unknown)	
Mann River		524	326	Bridge over the river (bridge name unknown)	
Clarence Valley	South Grafton	566	352	Bent Street – Grafton via Grafton Bridge	Roundabout
Clarence Valley	South Grafton	567	352	North Coast railway line	
Clarence Valley	South Grafton	568	353	Big River Way (B76/B91 north, B91 south) – Tyndale, Glenugie to Pacific Highway (A1) – Brisbane, Coffs Harbour, Newcastle, Sydney to Summerland Way (B91) – Casino, Kyogle, Brisbane	Eastern terminus of highway at roundabout Route B76 continues eastwards along Big River Way
1.000 mi = 1.609 km; 1.000 km = 0.621 mi: Concurrency terminus; Route transition

== See also ==
- Highways in Australia
- List of highways in New South Wales
