= Standifer =

Standifer may refer to:

- Standifer Bluff, Dustin Island, Antarctica
- G. M. Standifer Construction Company, an American shipbuilding company

== People with the surname ==
- Bill Standifer (1853-1903), American gunman and lawman
- James Israel Standifer (1779–1837), American politician
- Leon C. Standifer (1925-2016), American soldier, novelist and professor
- Lonnie Standifer (1926-1996), American scientist

== See also ==
- Sandifer, a surname
- Standiford, Louisville, United States
- Stannifer, New South Wales, Australia
