= Oakwood, New South Wales =

Oakwood New South Wales
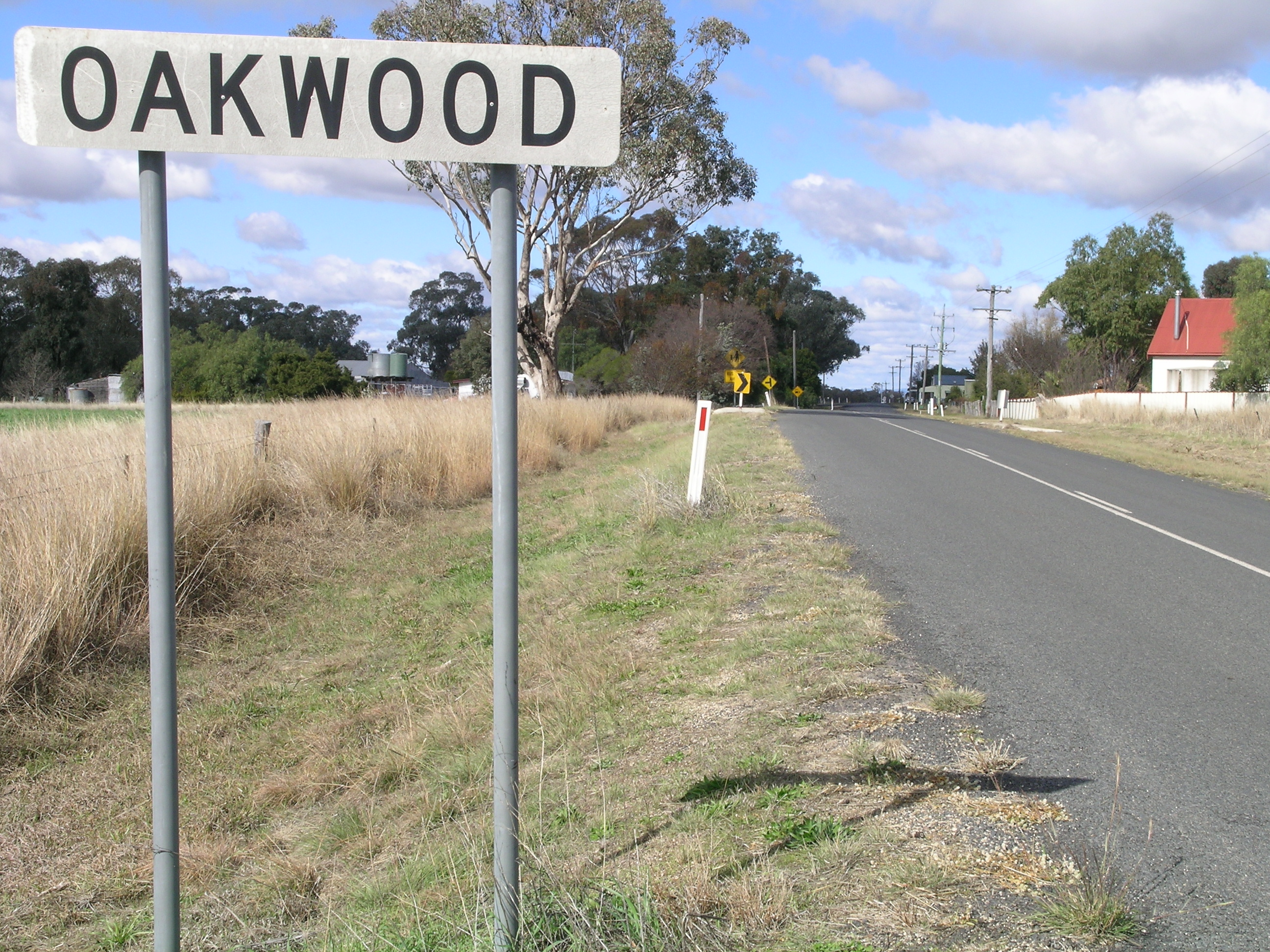
- Oakwood

- Coordinates: 29°38′S 151°02′E
- Population: 693 (2006 census)
- Postcode(s): 2360
- Elevation: 620 m (2,034 ft)
- Location: 593 km (368 mi) N of Sydney; 453 km (281 mi) SW of Brisbane; 19 km (12 mi) N of Inverell
- LGA(s): Inverell Shire
- County: Arrawatta
- State electorate(s): Northern Tablelands
- Federal division(s): New England

Oakwood is a small rural village on the North West Slopes of the New England region. The village is situated on the Inverell to Yetman Road approximately 19 kilometres northwest of Inverell and 100 km from Yetman in Inverell Shire, New South Wales, Australia.

Oakwood was named after its English counterpart. Oakwood Post Office opened on 16 April 1883 and closed in 1971.

== Population ==
According to the 2006 Census, there were 693 people living in Oakwood and the surrounding area: 52.8% were males and 47.2% were females. The area surrounding Oakwood is an agricultural area producing grains, sheep and beef cattle.

Children from Oakwood usually attend schools in Inverell.
