= Arrawatta County =

Arrawatta New South Wales
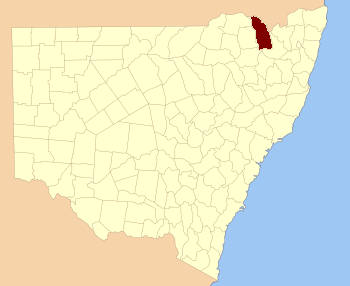
- Location in New South Wales

- Coordinates: 29°14′27″S 151°06′34″E
Lands administrative divisions around Arrawatta:
Stapylton	Clive (Qld)	Clive (Qld)
Burnett	Arrawatta	Clive
Murchison	Hardinge	Gough

Arrawatta County, New South Wales is one of the 141 cadastral divisions of New South Wales. It includes Ashford. The name Arrawatta is thought to be derived from a local aboriginal word for the area that includes Arrawatta County.

== Parishes ==
A full list of parishes found within this county; their current LGA and mapping coordinates to the approximate centre of each location is as follows:

Parish	LGA	Coordinates
Alpine	Inverell Shire	29°05′54″S 151°14′04″E
Athol	Inverell Shire	29°22′54″S 151°25′04″E
Astley	Inverell Shire	29°26′54″S 151°26′04″E
Ashford	Inverell Shire	29°19′54″S 151°05′04″E
Ashby	Inverell Shire	29°15′54″S 151°12′04″E
Anderson	Inverell Shire	28°41′54″S 150°45′04″E
Arthurs Seat	Inverell Shire	29°22′54″S 150°59′04″E
Adowa	Inverell Shire	29°10′54″S 151°12′04″E
Bannockburn	Inverell Shire	29°34′54″S 150°58′04″E
Barden	Inverell Shire	29°44′54″S 150°42′04″E
Bebo	Inverell Shire	29°46′54″S 150°46′04″E
Bengalla	Inverell Shire	28°40′54″S 150°40′04″E
Blloonbah	Inverell Shire	29°30′54″S 151°26′04″E
Bonshaw	Inverell Shire	28°59′54″S 151°12′04″E
Bora	Inverell Shire	29°47′54″S 150°58′04″E
Bowman	Inverell Shire	29°14′54″S 151°21′04″E
Buckley	Inverell Shire	29°41′54″S 151°31′04″E
Bukkulla	Inverell Shire	29°30′54″S 151°08′04″E
Bunal	Inverell Shire	29°03′54″S 150°51′04″E
Burgundy	Inverell Shire	29°38′54″S 151°08′04″E
Byron	Inverell Shire	29°43′54″S 150°59′04″E
Campbell	Inverell Shire	28°58′54″S 150°54′04″E
Champagne	Inverell Shire	29°37′54″S 151°04′04″E
Chapman	Inverell Shire	29°20′54″S 151°11′04″E
Cox	Inverell Shire	29°49′54″S 150°56′04″E
Cucumber	Inverell Shire	29°13′54″S 150°52′04″E
Dight	Inverell Shire	29°50′54″S 150°48′04″E
Dumaresq	Inverell Shire	28°40′54″S 150°34′04″E
East Yetman	Inverell Shire	29°55′54″S 150°52′04″E
Egerton	Inverell Shire	29°25′54″S 151°12′04″E
Ellis	Inverell Shire	28°53′54″S 151°02′04″E
Ena	Inverell Shire	29°07′54″S 150°53′04″E
Frazer	Inverell Shire	29°30′54″S 151°11′04″E
Goonian	Inverell Shire	28°55′54″S 151°13′04″E
Gordon	Inverell Shire	28°41′54″S 150°49′04″E
Graman	Inverell Shire	29°30′54″S 150°54′04″E
Hallam	Inverell Shire	29°03′54″S 151°06′04″E
Hawthorne	Inverell Shire	29°18′54″S 151°24′04″E
Hetherington	Inverell Shire	28°57′54″S 151°03′04″E
Hogarth	Inverell Shire	29°25′54″S 151°19′04″E
Holdfast	Inverell Shire	28°48′54″S 150°42′04″E
Holmes	Inverell Shire	29°55′54″S 150°56′04″E
Kings Plains	Inverell Shire	29°33′54″S 151°22′04″E
Leslie	Inverell Shire	29°16′54″S 150°58′04″E
Limestone	Inverell Shire	29°09′54″S 150°59′04″E
Lockerby	Inverell Shire	29°20′54″S 151°16′04″E
Lorne	Inverell Shire	29°17′54″S 151°18′04″E
Macintyre	Inverell Shire	29°12′54″S 150°57′04″E
McDonald	Inverell Shire	29°15′54″S 151°05′04″E
Mandoe	Inverell Shire	29°01′54″S 150°56′04″E
Meriti	Inverell Shire	28°57′54″S 150°58′04″E
Myall	Inverell Shire	29°08′54″S 151°06′04″E
North Nullamanna	Inverell Shire	29°38′54″S 151°14′04″E
Nullamanna	Inverell Shire	29°38′54″S 151°13′04″E
Pindari	Inverell Shire	29°31′54″S 151°18′04″E
Redbank	Inverell Shire	29°30′54″S 150°58′04″E
Rose	Inverell Shire	29°01′54″S 151°00′04″E
Russell	Inverell Shire	29°23′14″S 150°55′20″E
St Andrews	Inverell Shire	29°22′54″S 151°22′04″E
Samuel	Inverell Shire	29°46′54″S 150°47′04″E
Severn	Inverell Shire	29°06′54″S 150°58′04″E
Swamp Oak	Inverell Shire	29°40′54″S 151°20′04″E
Texas	Inverell Shire	28°53′54″S 151°08′04″E
Trigamon	Inverell Shire	29°56′54″S 150°46′04″E
Vivier	Glen Innes Severn Council	29°33′54″S 151°30′04″E
Wallangra	Inverell Shire	29°12′54″S 150°53′04″E
Wandera	Inverell Shire	29°04′14″S 151°08′04″E
Weean	Inverell Shire	29°34′54″S 151°18′04″E
Wyndham	Inverell Shire	29°31′54″S 151°03′04″E
Yetman	Inverell Shire	29°53′54″S 150°45′04″E
