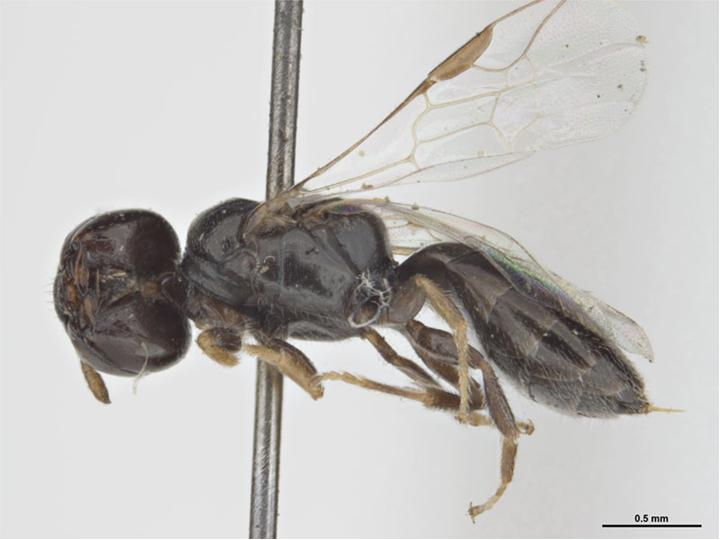
- Female

Scientific classification
- Kingdom: Animalia
- Phylum: Arthropoda
- Clade: Pancrustacea
- Class: Insecta
- Order: Hymenoptera
- Family: Colletidae
- Genus: Euryglossina
- Species: E. nigra

Binomial name
- Euryglossina nigra Exley, 1968

= Euryglossina nigra =

Species of bee

Euryglossina nigra, or Euryglossina (Euryglossina) nigra, is a species of bee in the family Colletidae and the subfamily Euryglossinae. It is endemic to Australia. It was described in 1968 by Australian entomologist Elizabeth Exley.

== Distribution and habitat ==
The species occurs in eastern Australia. The type locality is Brisbane. It has also been recorded from Capalaba, Mount Pleasant and Beerwah in Queensland, as well as from Wallangra, New South Wales.

== Behaviour ==
The adults are flying mellivores. Flowering plants visited by the bees include Callistemon, Leptospermum and Syncarpia species.
