= Dalwood House =

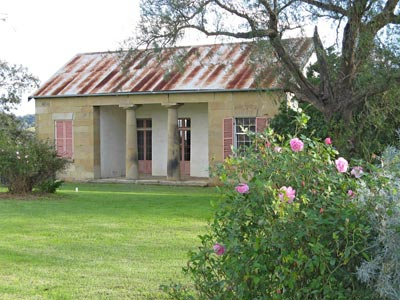
- Dalwood House

- Location within New South Wales Location within Australia
- 32.6467°S 151.4152°E
- Location: Dalwood Road, Branxton, Singleton Council, New South Wales, Australia

History
- Built: 1829–1838

Site notes
- Owner: National Trust of Australia (NSW)

New South Wales Heritage Register
- Official name: Dalwood House and surrounds of Wyndham Estate; Wyndham estate
- Type: state heritage (complex / group)
- Designated: 2 April 1999
- Reference no.: 377
- Type: Vineyard/Winery
- Category: Farming and Grazing
- Builders: George Wyndham

Dalwood House is a heritage-listed homestead and now house museum at Dalwood Road, Branxton, in the Hunter region of New South Wales, Australia. It was built from 1829 to 1838 by George Wyndham. It sits in the grounds of the former Wyndham Estate winery (now known as Dalwood Estate). It was added to the New South Wales State Heritage Register on 2 April 1999.

== History ==
In 1823 David Maziere acquired a 2,000 acre crown land grant in the Hunter Valley. He called the property Anandale Estate and set about fencing stock yards and paddocks and cultivating 60 acres of land. Due to insolvency, Anandale Estate was put up for auction in January 1828 and purchased for 1,200 pounds by George Wyndham.

Wyndham and his wife Margaret had arrived in Australia in 1827. They moved to the property early in 1828 and renamed it "Dalwood" after a wooded portion of the Dinton Estate.

The construction of Dalwood House began in 1829 and proceeded in stages. Its stone was quarried by convicts and it had to be a large house as Wyndham and his wife had 12 sons and 2 daughters. The first two roofs, within a flat-roofed pavilion, were completed and occupied in February 1830, although the house was incomplete. By 1833 a washhouse, kitchen and wings had been completed.

75 architectural drawings prepared for William Wyndham between 1812 and 1817 have been located in the drawings collection of the Royal Institute of British Architects at the Victoria and Albert Museum in London.

Drawings prepared for William Wyndham between 1812 and 1817. They include the initial proposals for remodelling the Dinton house, by architect Jeffry Wyatt (later Sir Jeffry Wyatville). Two rough sketches, dated 12 October 1812, which were probably made during Wyatville's initial visit to Dinton, show the floor plan of the existing late-Elizabethan or early Jacobean house, with suggested additions and new entrance portico. A comparison of the floor plan of the original house at Dinton and that built at Dalwood, shows a striking resemblance. Whilst not identical, there are more than enough similarities to allow that George built a house using a floor plan with which he was both familiar and comfortable. An alternate theory suggests that Helenus Scott of Glendon, near Singleton, due to being a friend of George Wyndham who had having several houses with similar courtyards to that at Dalwood.

It is quite likely that Scott influenced Wyndham to include the verandahs on the three sides of the courtyard, based on his experience of the climate in India. The front verandah is another story. There is enough evidence to show that George had intended to build an imposing portico at the front, overlooking the river. Columns had been quarried for the purpose. However, while he was living at the Richmond River in the mid-1840s, the columns were cut up for grinding stones and the portico was not built. There is a simple verandah.

The flat roof structure was constructed of split slabs nailed over timber beams. A thick layer of earth (approx.150mm) was topped with a further 40mm layer containing tar, sand, lime and blood. Scientific analysis by Dr George Gibbons at the time showed the upper layer to be a relatively strong mix of one part lime to three parts sand topped with bitumen or coal tar, suggesting it was intended as a waterproofing measure. It soon failed and around 1838 a pitched roof was added.

=== Vineyards and viticulture at Dalwood ===
The planting of vineyards and the making of wine were given every encouragement by the early Governors of New South Wales, as well as by urban and rural authorities, for their economic value and also partly, if not chiefly, for their "sobering" appeal.

In 1825 James Busby wrote the first of a number of books on viticulture and winemaking. In 1833, he brought 437 grape cuttings back to NSW and made these widely available (through the Botanic Gardens, Sydney). Busby, who had been trained in vineyard management, grape varieties and winemaking in France, referred to Gregory Blaxland's vineyard as being a showplace in the Sydney Basin. He commented on the generosity of Blaxland to share his knowledge and cuttings from his vineyard. Cuttings from Blaxland's Brush Farm provided early vines for Wyndham Estate (then Dalwood) in the Hunter Valley. It was not until the 1830s that William Macarthur sent 34,000 vines to the Barossa Valley in South Australia, to begin the wine industry in that state.

There is no indication of who actually planted the first vines in the Hunter Valley. The first official returns did not appear until 1843 and listed only acreages and production figures by counties. However, a list of vines planted in the colony by 1832 appears in manuscript notes on the flyleaves of a copy of James Busby's 1830 publication, "A Manual of plain directions for planting and cultivating vineyards and for making wine in NSW". At this stage there were 10 settlers on the Hunter River growing vines. These included George Wyndham at Dalwood who had 2 acres. The total (15.5 acres) was, of course small but already two of the vineyards that were to achieve outstanding reputations in later years, Dalwood and Kirkton, had been established.

Wyndham's diary covering the years 1830-1840 is expansive on one topic only: his first attempts to make wine. His first attempt to grow vines was made in 1830, when he received, on 31 July, vine cuttings "from Mr Busby". Clearing and planting took place in August, but very few of the 600 vines took: "they were dead before I got them". He planted again in August 1831, and had 1400 vines in January 1832. In July 1832 he received cuttings of Muscatel, Black Hamburgh, Red Portugal, Green Malaga, Constantia and Black Cluster varieties from Captain Wright. Further plantings took place in July and August 1833, with cuttings from Captain Wright and a Mr Townshend, including some extra varieties, and still more in June 1834, with Oporto and Gouais cuttings from James P. Webber of Tocal. The diary also gives details of other vineyard activities during these years: clearing, hoeing, ploughing, staking and pruning. His first vintage was in February 1835. It was not a marked success as he had fermentation troubles with his Black Cluster grapes. However, by the end of the month he was reporting success with his white wine. In the following year he reported that he had a vintage of 1650 gallons which seems to suggest the produce of 2 or 3 acres, perhaps more in yields were low. This diary is the sole first-hand account we have by an inexperienced winemaker and emphasises the problems and very hesitant first steps being taken.

A further problem was the lack of skilled labour. Vine dressing was a skilled occupation. With a few exceptions, such labour was unavailable. The early settlers mostly used convict labour, though Wyndham had the additional help of the Aborigines to pull the maize. It is true that what labour had to be hired was quite cheap. In 1833 Wyndham hired "Tom, ploughman" at 5 shillings, a 1/4 pound of tobacco, 2 oz. of tea, 2 lb.s of sugar, 10 lb.s of flour and 10 lb.s of beef per week.

The Wyndhams' wine reached such a standard that they won prizes all over the world, in Europe, America and India. At the Bordeaux Exhibition 1882 they were awarded the coveted Gold Medal for best Australian wine. George and his wife who was of French extraction had 13 children, 12 of these sons. George was not only keen on farming but loved horses. In 1830 he wrote to his father asking for a special stallion to be sent. This was answered by a gift of a combined threshing machine and mill. Crops at Dalwood that year were maize, wheat, hemp, mustard, castor oil, tobacco, millet and Cape barley. Also, every variety of fruit tree and vegetables and flowers were grown. They had plenty of assigned servants and treated them well. In 1831 Wyndham selected 2560 acres near Merriwa called Mahngarinda, later increased by leasing 3830 acres extra. In 1832 more land was bought at Dalwood, Terrace Hill, 960 acres were added to the farm, for 360 pounds. In 1839 he joined adventurers travelling to the north and secured Bukkula, 100,000 acres, near the present-day town of Inverell. Also he took up Collyblu on the Liverpool Plains c. 1840 and Keelgyrah on the Richmond River (although these were not mentioned in the Government Gazette until 1848).

So great was the interest to be in winemaking that when the first returns for vineyards were made in 1844 for the year 1843, the Hunter had 262.5 acres of a NSW total of 508. By 1850 this had grown to over 500 acres. The "Maitland Mercury" estimated that in 1850 there were 32 vine growers in the Maitland police district alone. The Hunter pattern was for large farming and grazing properties. John Dunmore Lang noted that in 1836 the farms varied from 500 to 2000 acres, and were held by free immigrants employing convict labour. The areas devoted to vines were necessarily small though Lang does say that the wealthy proprietors had their vineyards managed by scientific and practical vine dressers from southern Europe and that landholders were already talking of exporting wine to India and England.

The 1840s depression gripped the colonies, causing crises in labour and prices and consequent havoc in the established agricultural industries. Possibly this helped stimulate interest in vine cultivation as a new source of profit, its attractions being its suitability to the climate and soil, relatively low production costs and high yields and above all, once vintage problems were overcome, its non-perishable nature which made wine particularly suitable as an article for storage and export. At all events, winemaking increased as an activity during these depression years. Of the major pioneer growers only George Wyndham at Dalwood found conditions too difficult to continue, and in 1845 he left Dalwood to take up properties first near Kyogle and then at Bukkulla near Inverell. Dalwood was advertised to let and at that stage, its 3-4000 acres contained about 5 acres of vines. When conditions improved Wyndham returned to Dalwood and resumed winemaking operations there.

From 1853 the vineyards grew to be the second largest in the world. John Wyndham, George Wyndham's fourth son continued to run the property until 1887. By 1886 wine production had added cellars, press house, cooperage and offices.

Cuttings from Wyndham's vineyard at Dalwood supplied some of the earliest vineyards to be established (Wilkinson's "Oakdale", and possibly Campbell's "Daisy Hill" from 1852 onwards) in the Pokolbin Hills after the Robertson Land Act of 1861 released land in that area, and a rush to take up land here where it appeared most attractive for agriculture, took place.

In 1868 Sir William Macarthur MLC was elected President of the Agricultural Society of NSW and Lord Belmore, Governor of NSW, was made patron. The Society's name and constitution were discussed by a committee on 3 February 1868. A few days later John Wyndham and others were appointed as a committee to draw up rules, which were adopted on 7 April. That society's first show, or Metropolitan Intercolonial Exhibition as it was called, was held at the Cleveland Paddock, which is now known as Prince Alfred Park, in Sydney. The committee which managed this first exhibition in Sydney (earlier forms of the Society had had exhibitions in Parramatta since the 1820s) included J. Wyndham. It was a great success and began what became known as the Royal Easter Show. That Wyndham was among those asked to draw up the rules and constitution for the society, subsequently being incorporated and later becoming the Royal Agricultural Society, shows he was respected by his peers and continued the Wyndham tradition of contributing to the betterment of the wider community. John Wyndham appears to have contributed significantly to the arrangements for the red and white wine section and may very well be regarded as having laid the foundations for what developed into Australia's premier wine show.

Among the Mitchell Library's collection is a document showing the plans and contents of extensive varieties of fruit trees that Wyndham planted at Dalwood. It indicates how, like so many settlers, he had serious intent to experiment with and trial as many different varieties of each fruit, to determine the most suitable for the Australian conditions. It also indicates in some cases those people from whom Wyndham obtained varieties and with whom he probably had social contact. The list contains 39 varieties of apple; 2 of quinces; 25 of pears; 2 of almonds; 9 of plums; 4 of apricots; 6 of nectarines; 5 of figs; 14 of peaches; 3 of mulberries; 2 of medlars; loquats; oranges, citrons; pomegranates; Spanish (or sweet) chestnut; olive, gooseberries; currants; raspberries; filbert (or hazelnut); walnuts; and 9 grape varieties. There are many more varieties of grapes listed in his diary and elsewhere.

The 1893 bank crash and subsequent depression badly affected this early wine industry. It was further depressed by the removal of interstate trade barriers following Federation in 1901, with the result that the market was flooded with cheap South Australian wines. During this time grape growing retreated to select pockets around Branxton, Rothbury, Cessnock and Pokolbin. By the end of the First World War, winemaking was on the increase again, only to be devastated by the mildew disease of the 1920s. It suffered badly during the 1930s depression but gradually, after the war as Australia's drinking habits changed, it showed a slow and steady increase. Until the 1960s the wine growing areas of the Cessnock district were known amongst wine buffs for their high quality table wines, although the area produced less than 1% of Australia's wine.

Between 1901 until 1972 the property was subdivided by subsequent ownerships.

Up to 1959 some of the original convict-planted vines remained in the vineyard. These were then uprooted. The Dalwood vineyards and estate now (in 1966) belongs to Messrs. Penfold, who have also given the name "Dalwood" to a 723-acre estate 40 miles from the parent Dalwood vineyard and 15 miles west of the dairying centre of Muswellbrook. 300 acres of this new Dalwood Estate, which was bought in 1960, were, by 1965, planted with the finest table-wine varieties.

=== Dalwood House from the 1950s ===
In 1972 the property was conveyed to Wyndham Estate Pty Ltd. In 1988 the property was transferred to the National Trust of Australia (NSW). The property is currently owned by Orlando Wyndham.

The house was vacant for many years and considerable degradation has occurred as it has entered a phase of accelerating dilapidation. Located on highly plastic soil, extremities of wet and dry and poor roof and site drainage have caused severed movement and partial collapse of the structure.

During the later decades of the 20th century, the roof form of the homestead was again altered when the portico roof was raised in pitch to the same height as the main roof and decorative parapets and gables of the portico were removed, which were then covered in sheet iron.

Between 1973 and 1974 the west rear wing of the homestead was demolished after it had substantially deteriorated. Remnants of the rear wing footings are now covered by a modern metal-sheeted roof structure that was erected in 1990 to interpret the original form of the west wing and courtyard verandah.

During the 1980s and 1990s extensive conservation works were carried out under the guidance of conservation architects Howard Tanner & Associates including re-roofing with corrugated steel sheeting and roof drainage, conservation of the southern verandah, including rebuilding to its original configuration with timber-shingled roof, external joinery, shutters and timber columns; reinstating damaged/missing joinery including French doors, 12-paned windows and shutters; stabilisation/reconstruction of brick and sandstone walls, footings including construction of a concrete apron slab and site drainage system; weather-proofing; restoration of three principal rooms of the main central block; reconstruction of fireplaces in principal rooms; reconstruction of the rear courtyard verandah.

It continues to undergo conservation works, organised by community group the Dalwood Restoration Association. Dalwood Estate was opened to the public on weekends in March 2018.

== Description ==
Dalwood House is set on a slight rise overlooking the vineyards established by George Wyndham in the 1830s on the west bank of the Hunter River. Much of the historic landscape remains intact including a timber barn and the graves of George and Margaret Wyndham amidst the vineyards overlooking the house.

The flat roof structure was constructed of split slabs nailed over timber beams. A thick layer of earth (approx.150mm) was topped with a further 40mm layer containing tar, sand, lime and blood. Scientific analysis by Dr George Gibbons at the time showed the upper layer to be a relatively strong mix of one part lime to three parts sand topped with bitumen or coal tar, suggesting it was intended as a waterproofing measure. It soon failed and around 1838 a pitched roof was added.

=== House ===
Dalwood is an expansive single storey sandstone and predominantly locally sourced brick residence in the Greek Revival style and built in stages between 1829 and 1838. It has a Greek portico, two parapeted wings with bedrooms and servants quarters on either side of the courtyard. A verandah faces the river and forms the main entrance to the house. The dominant external element is the classic sandstone portico with its pair of squat columns.

The external walls are of dressed coursed sandstone externally and random rubble internally. A number of internal walls are of sandstock brick. The stonework included finely detailed gable pediments and corbelled parapets which conceal early attempts at flat roof construction. The roof is now corrugated iron. The house contains carved sandstone mantlepieces and elegant joinery of local cedar.

The house consists of a long central block facing south that originally had a parapeted wing at each end with bedrooms and study and two rear wings to the north to form a courtyard.

The courtyard features a flagged covered verandah along the central, east and west wings. Originally, bedrooms opened off the verandah from the east wing on one side and various informal rooms, servants' quarters and service rooms were in the west wing (now demolished) on the opposite side.

The central block faces south to the Hunter River and features French doors opening onto a verandah with a direct connection to the garden, covered with a timber shingle roof (1980s reconstruction) and supported by plain rectangular timber columns.

The core of the main central block was originally covered with a flat roof structure, which was later built over and covered with corrugated iron. Remnants of the flat roof still exist.

The interiors were originally furnished with features typical of colonial houses of the period, with Australian cedar joinery, fireplaces of carved stone and wood, lime-plastered internal walls, lath-and-plaster ceilings and timber-boarded floors. Most of the original and early interior finishes have deteriorated and have been removed.

=== Garden ===
Much of the historic landscape remains intact including several mature trees surrounding the homestead.

== Heritage listing ==
Dalwood House is significant because it reflects the history of one of the most important pioneering families in the Hunter Valley. The house is a rare survival of one of the earliest Greek Revival buildings in New South Wales and the earliest known example of the style in the Hunter Valley. It is significant for its association with the development of viticulture and the development of the Hunter Valley wine industry. The fabric reveals the constructional evolution of the house and notably an innovative attempt at flat roof construction

Dalwood House and surrounds of Wyndham Estate was listed on the New South Wales State Heritage Register on 2 April 1999 having satisfied the following criteria.

The place is important in demonstrating the course, or pattern, of cultural or natural history in New South Wales.

Dalwood House is historically significant because it reflects the history of one of the most influential pioneering families in the Hunter Valley. Dalwood epitomizes the aspirations of the early English settlers in the region.

The place is important in demonstrating aesthetic characteristics and/or a high degree of creative or technical achievement in New South Wales.

Dalwood House is aesthetically significant because it is a rare survival of one of the earliest Greek Revival buildings in New South Wales and the earliest known example of the style in the Hunter Valley. Dalwood retains its historic setting amidst vineyards and pastures and in particular its historic visual links with neighbouring Leconfield homestead and the Wyndham family graves.

The place has a strong or special association with a particular community or cultural group in New South Wales for social, cultural or spiritual reasons.

Dalwood House is socially significant because of its association with the development of viticulture and the development of the Hunter Valley wine industry.

The place has potential to yield information that will contribute to an understanding of the cultural or natural history of New South Wales.

Dalwood House is technically significant because the form and plan of the remaining fabric of Dalwood House have undergone little alteration since the 1830s. The fabric reveals the constructional evolution of the house and notably an innovative attempt at flat roof construction. The roof is of great technological interest as one of the earliest of its type in Australia.
