= The Branxton Advocate =

Former newspaper in New South Wales, Australia

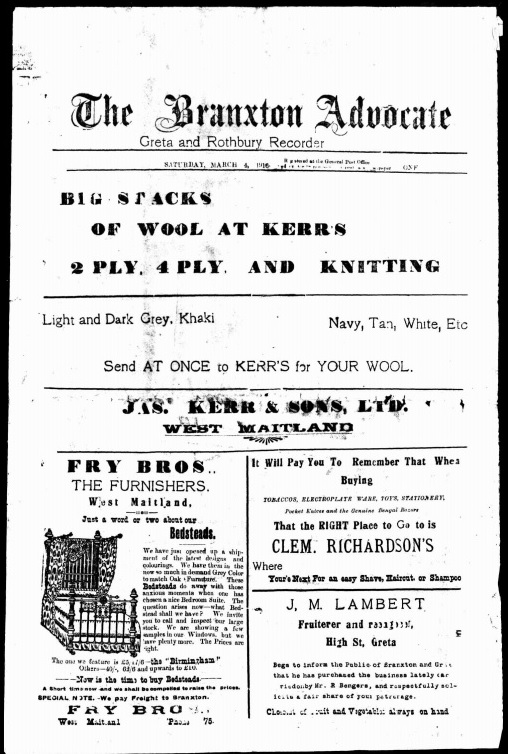
Branxton Advocate: Greta and Rothbury Recorder, 4 March 1916

The Branxton Advocate: Greta and Rothbury Recorder was an English language newspaper that was published in Branxton, New South Wales Australia. There is only one known issue, which was published on 4 March 1916.

== History ==
The Branxton Advocate: Greta and Rothbury Recorder has only one known issue. This issue published on a variety of topics including women's interests, notes on the war, general interest topics, poetry and advertising.

== Digitisation ==
The various versions of the paper have been digitised as part of the Australian Newspapers Digitisation Program project hosted by the National Library of Australia.

== See also ==
- List of newspapers in New South Wales
