= Wing Hing Long & Co. Store =

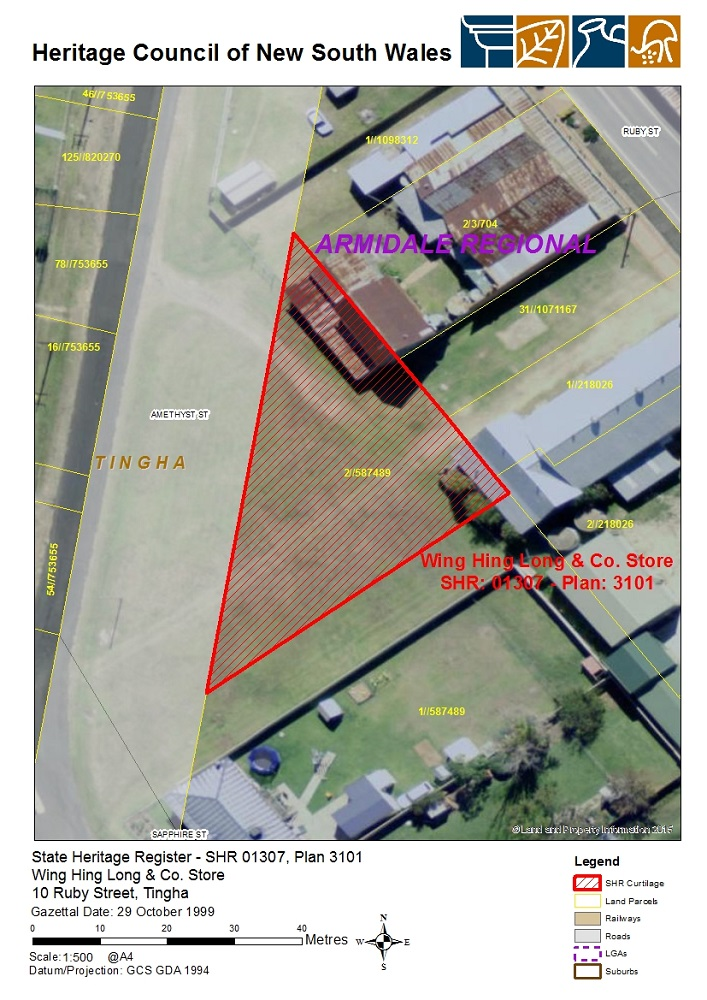
- Heritage boundaries

- Location within New South Wales Location within Australia
- 29.9551°S 151.2110°E
- Location: 10 Ruby Street, Tingha, Inverell Shire, New South Wales, Australia

History
- Built: 1881–1895

Site notes
- Owner: Inverell Shire Council

New South Wales Heritage Register
- Official name: Wing Hing Long & Co. Store
- Type: state heritage (built)
- Designated: 29 October 1999
- Reference no.: 1307
- Type: Retail & Wholesale Objects (movable)
- Category: Retail and Wholesale

Wing Hing Long & Co. Store is a heritage-listed former store and now museum at 10 Ruby Street, Tingha, Inverell Shire, New South Wales, Australia. It was built from 1881 to 1895, by Chen Quin Jack. The property is owned by the Inverell Shire Council. It was added to the New South Wales State Heritage Register on 29 October 1999.

== History ==
The land on which Wing Hing Long is situated was originally part of the land granted (by Crown Grant) to William Millis, James Tysoe, William Moore, Samuel Wilkinson and Francis Tait on 11 December 1879. In 1881 the property was purchased by Ah Lin, a storekeeper of Inverell. From this date until the sale of the property to Guyra Shire Council in early 1998, the Wing Hing Long store and residence were owned by Chinese immigrants and their descendants. Ah Lin was followed by Ding Chee, a butcher from Vegetable Creek (now Emmaville) (1883); Jock Sing from Glen Innes (1883 to 1887); Ah Bow, a miner from Tingha (1877 to 1899); and Charles Hing, a storekeeper from Tingha (1899 to 1918). In 1918 another Chinese immigrant, Jack Joe Lowe, became the owner of the property. He owned and managed the store until 1939 when it was transferred to his eldest son, Edgar Lowe. In 1951, J.J. Lowe's daughter, Mavis Pratt, bought the property and ran the business until early 1998.

The history of ownership is a reminder of the long and continuous association of Chinese-Australians with the town of Tingha, and with establishing and managing general stores in regional New South Wales during the late nineteenth and first half of the twentieth century.

The town of Tingha was created in the early 1870s. It was a private town built for the large increase in population caused by the discovery of rich tin deposits in the area. By the 1880s the town and its surrounding district had a population of around 4,000. Among the new arrivals were many Chinese who, at the peak of the mining boom, numbered around 900. Most came as miners. Some provided services required by the miners. Among these were stores usually established initially to provide the goods and services (including Chinese cooking ingredients, letter writing services, banking services) required by the Chinese residents. Then, as the number of Chinese diminished, the stores extended their customer base to the broader local community. The subsequent histories of these stores reflect aspects of the rise and decline of general stores throughout regional areas and, indeed, the rise and decline of particular towns and communities. They also reveal aspects, which can be attributed specifically to their place as Chinese-Australian owned stores. Wing Hing Long in its fabric, its archival and movable heritage collections, and in its history provides a unique insight into this part of New South Wales' heritage.

From research to date, it seems that the main section of the Wing Hing Long store was built some time in the 1880s or early 1890s. The building materials and construction still extant appear to date from this period. A photograph taken in about 1900 shows that, by the turn of the century, the store was an established business. Newspaper advertisements from the time indicate the services provided: "The noted cheap store of Tingha. Groceries, drapery, ironmongery, tobacco, pipes and everything that goes to make up new stock. Prices defy competition.".

Wing Hing Long, like so many general stores in country areas, continued to provide and develop this mixture of goods and services throughout the first half of the twentieth century. Oral histories and newspaper advertisements offer evocative descriptions. Mavis Pratt, for example, recalled that when she was growing up in the 1920s and 1930s the store offered 'Grocery, drapery, materials, ... hats, children's wear, shoes, wallpapers, furniture, linos, dredging goods, ... explosives for dredging.'. A 1924 local newspaper advertisement reminded that the owner, J.J. Lowe, also offered his expertise as "The Noted Chinese Herbalist" able to treat a variety of complaints.

The store itself was divided into different departments. Surviving signage, fittings and furnishings along with recorded memories provide clear indications of the goods displayed and sold in the various sections of the store. The cashier's box and cashier's pulley, also still in place, provide a demonstration of how payments were made. At its height in the first half of the twentieth century, this was a thriving business with between ten and fifteen staff members who included overseas-born Chinese and local residents (both Chinese and non-Chinese).

The presence of overseas-born Chinese among the staff was a product both of Chinese traditions and of the restrictions imposed by the 1901 Immigration Restriction Act. For Chinese outside China, providing opportunities for family and clan members was important. This meant assisting them to migrate to find work. Under the 1901 legislation one of the few areas of employment open to new Chinese immigrants was as shop assistants sponsored by their compatriots. As with other Chinese general stores at the time, Wing Hing Long provided Chinese employees with accommodation, board and a salary. Their living quarters were in the sheds underneath the family residence and, for a time, a couple of them also slept in the upstairs section of the store. The conditions of their sponsorship entailed that they were bound to work at Wing Hing Long.

After the Second World War the store continued as a thriving and viable enterprise into the 1960s. Mrs Pratt's sons, John and Peter, remember how as young children they helped with the packaging of bulk goods out the back of the store, and the collecting and delivering of orders around the town. However, the business was slowly undermined by declining job opportunities, the decreasing population in the town and the improved roads and communications. This meant that there were fewer local customers and those who did remain, had easier access to the expanding supermarkets in the nearby larger town of Inverell. The goods and services offered slowly contracted until, by the 1980s, Wing Hing Long was primarily a grocery store with business and displays concentrated in the main room of the store.

In 1997 Mavis Pratt decided it was definitely time to retire. In early 1998 the store and most of its contents were purchased by Guyra Shire Council for community management (by the Tingha Progress Association) as a store museum. This transfer of ownership was achieved with the assistance of the Golden Threads Project, the cooperation of the Pratt family, the commitment and negotiating skills of Ron Pickering and the Tingha community, and the financial support of the NSW Heritage Office and the NSW Ministry for the Arts.

Since the transfer of ownership, necessary maintenance and repair work has been done on parts of the building, computer databases have been established for accessioning and cataloguing the movable heritage and archival collections, and initial work has been done on the collections. Wing Hing Long opened in its new guise as a community managed store museum in January 1999.

Following the transfer of Tingha from the Armidale Region to the Shire of Inverell on 1 July 2019, the ownership of Wing Hing Long Co Store transferred to the Inverell Shire Council.

== Description ==
Wing Hing Long Co Store is a complex of different buildings. The main part of the complex houses the store and consists of four parallel sections with the centre two sections having a gabled roof, and the two side sections having skillion roofs. An awning across the footpath links these sections.

There is a courtyard at the rear of the store and at the rear of the courtyard are two connected large storage sheds. Above one of the sheds is a first floor residence with an external staircase providing access to the external verandah, which looks down on the courtyard and towards the main building. As heritage architect Tim Shellshear noted in his report this 'suggests that both commercial and domestic life were one and the same.'

In the courtyard itself there is a water tank and an outside toilet cubicle which, until 1998, housed a pan toilet.

The main store and two showrooms have cypress pine floor boards, a variety of wall cladding (timber weatherboard, Wunderlich embossed metal panelling, plain sheet metal, galvanised iron sheeting) and galvanised iron roofs. Above the main store there is roof storage entered by a roughly made and fairly steep timber ladder immediately behind the cashier's office at the rear of the store. In this roof space there are a number of skylight shafts, including one at the rear which also seems at some stage to have been an opening between the storage area and the store below.

At the rear of the northern show room are three partitioned areas constituting the remains of the store office and an adjoining room housing the office safe (which has rusted closed). The office section is separated from the showroom by a pine-boarded screen with a decorative glass screen across its top.

There is sign writing dating from before the Second World War on the walls in both showrooms. The southern showroom bearing the sign "Use our lay-by system" and the northern showroom, the sign "Showroom".

Throughout the store there are a variety of original timber shop counters, display units, cabinets, and shelving. Most appear to be locally made. They include large fixed counters running either side of the main store, glass display cabinets constructed around the posts supporting the store roof, timber pigeon hole shelving (some still bearing the signage indicating, for example, the sizes of bolts), and a number and diverse range of free standing display stands and units. There is also still in situ the cashier's pulley, which was used to carry money from the counters to the cashier's office. The wires stretch to two different locations in the store, and the mechanism is still in working order.

The store also has on display a diverse range of store merchandise and advertising material. This includes grocery items, toys, clothing, shoes, stationery, hardware, and advertising signs and units. Some of the items date from the interwar years with the bulk of the grocery items (now emptied of their contents) dating from the 1960s to the late 1990s. The majority of these items came with the store when it transferred from private to public ownership in 1998.

The kitchen and dining room for both the store and the residence are located at the rear of the southern showroom. Access to them is either from a door in the rear southern end of the main store or through an external door at the back of the building. The kitchen still has its wood fired stove and fairly basic kitchen cupboards and sink.

The connected storage sheds at the rear of the property are pole frame constructions with the roof constructed from pine sapling rafters and battens. The roofing and walls are galvanised iron sheeting, and the floor (in very poor condition) consists of some timber floorboards and other sections in concrete.

Above the southern storage shed is the verandahed residence. According to Tim Shellshear (1998) this is "possibly the most interesting architectural element" in the complex. As he explains: "The unusual qualities of this residence, being galvanised iron clad, steeply gabled with inward facing verandah and surrounded by galvanised iron sheds creates an almost unique appearance." The interior of the residence consists of one large room across the east, two bedrooms at the rear, a small storeroom and a bathroom on the verandah.

Apart from the collection of movable heritage, which is an integral part of the complex, there is also an archival collection, which dates back to the early part of the twentieth century. This consists of a variety of store records, correspondence, brochures, shop ledgers and other records. Accessioning and cataloguing of the archival material has only recently commenced.

The building was reported to be in fair physical condition as at 5 August 1999, given that little maintenance had been carried out on the buildings for quite some time prior to 1998. As of 1999, some necessary maintenance and repair work had been carried out over the past 18 months.

The store and its contents have been retained largely as they were at time of acquisition in early 1998.

== Heritage listing ==
Wing Hing Long occupies a central position on the main street of Tingha. Its structure, fabric, and archival and movable heritage collections provide a unique documentation of the continuous and significant contribution of Chinese-Australians and of general stores to the history of retailing in regional New South Wales. They also provide significant insight into the rise and decline of the tin mining community in which the store is located.

Wing Hing Long & Co. Store was listed on the New South Wales State Heritage Register on 29 October 1999 having satisfied the following criteria.

The place is important in demonstrating the course, or pattern, of cultural or natural history in New South Wales.

Wing Hing Long provides a unique insight into the presence and contribution of Chinese-Australians in the history of retailing in Australia, and in the history of the tin mining town of Tingha. The store and its collections also provide a fairly unique surviving example of the fabric, structure, organisation, and goods and services of a country general store, which has operated continuously from the late nineteenth century to the end of the twentieth century.

The place is important in demonstrating aesthetic characteristics and/or a high degree of creative or technical achievement in New South Wales.

The aesthetic significance of Wing Hing Long lies in the patina of the complex with its mixture of materials and styles, and with its ability to evoke the changing styles and fortunes of the store and its town. At the core is the vernacular commercial building overlaid with accretions and additions of a century of trading and patching. It occupies a central position in the main street of Tingha.

The place has strong or special association with a particular community or cultural group in New South Wales for social, cultural or spiritual reasons.

Wing Hing Long is valued by the surrounding community as one of the oldest, if not the oldest, surviving general stores on the main street of Tingha and one which has strong associations with the Chinese presence in the town and the region. Its new role as a community managed museum has built on its long-standing social significance and provided an important focus for furthering and promoting interest in the history and future of the town.

The place has potential to yield information that will contribute to an understanding of the cultural or natural history of New South Wales.

Wing Hing Long has significant research potential for furthering our understanding of the structure, organisation, staffing, and goods and services provided by general stores in country areas, and the ways in which those aspects are influenced by and/or reflect the history of the surrounding community and, more broadly, the impact of national events and actions. This potential is greatly enhanced by the archival and movable heritage collections which are an integral part of the property, and by the significant number of local residents and visitors who have memories of the store's owners, and of shopping and/or working in the store.

Of technical interest is the cashier's pulley system which is still in situ, and which is in functioning order.

The place possesses uncommon, rare or endangered aspects of the cultural or natural history of New South Wales.

Wing Hing Long provides a rare example of continuous occupation and adaptation of a Chinese-owned country general store. It is also a rare example of vernacular store dating from the late nineteenth century and surviving largely intact.

Chinese owned general stores, large and small, were a feature of towns throughout regional NSW in the late nineteenth and early twentieth centuries. Of these stores, only about four remain and continue to be operated or identified as Chinese-Australian stores. Of these, Wing Hing Long is the only store, which retains its original fabric and features albeit overlaid with modifications and additions during the first few decades of the twentieth century. Significantly, few modifications have been made since the Second World War. It is a rare, and perhaps arguably, the only example of this type of store.

The place is important in demonstrating the principal characteristics of a class of cultural or natural places/environments in New South Wales.

Wing Hing Long provides an important example of a type of country general store, and provides insights into the work practices and services of country general stores during the late nineteenth and twentieth centuries.
