= Digitaria porrecta =

Conservation status
- Endangered (EPBC Act)

Scientific classification
- Kingdom: Plantae
- Clade: Embryophytes
- Clade: Tracheophytes
- Clade: Spermatophytes
- Clade: Angiosperms
- Clade: Monocots
- Clade: Commelinids
- Order: Poales
- Family: Poaceae
- Subfamily: Panicoideae
- Genus: Digitaria
- Species: D. porrecta

Binomial name
- Digitaria porrecta S.T.Blake

Synonyms
- Digitaria coenicola var. ramosa Vickery

Species of plant

Digitaria porrecta, commonly known as finger panic grass, is an Australian species of perennial grass (Poaceae).

== Description ==
Digitaria porrecta grows up to 60 cm (24 in) tall and has linear leaves that range from 5–15 cm (2.0–5.9 in) in length. Its ligules are 2–3 mm long and its racemes are up to 30 cm long.

== Distribution ==
The species is native to Queensland and New South Wales, Australia.

In Queensland, it occurs in the town of Nebo (south-west of Mackay). Additionally, it occurs in the Central Highlands and from Jandowae to Warwick.

In New South Wales, it occurs from Graman and Croppa Creek to the Liverpool Plains near Coonabarabran.

== Conservation ==
The species is listed as rare by the Nature Conservation Act 1992. As for most plants in this area, threats to Digitaria porrecta include loss of habitat from bushfires and urban expansion, trampling from grazing livestock, and invasive grasses such as Chloris gayana (Rhodes grass) and Urochloa panicoides (liverseed grass).

== See also ==
- List of Digitaria species
