= Stannifer, New South Wales =

Stannifer New South Wales
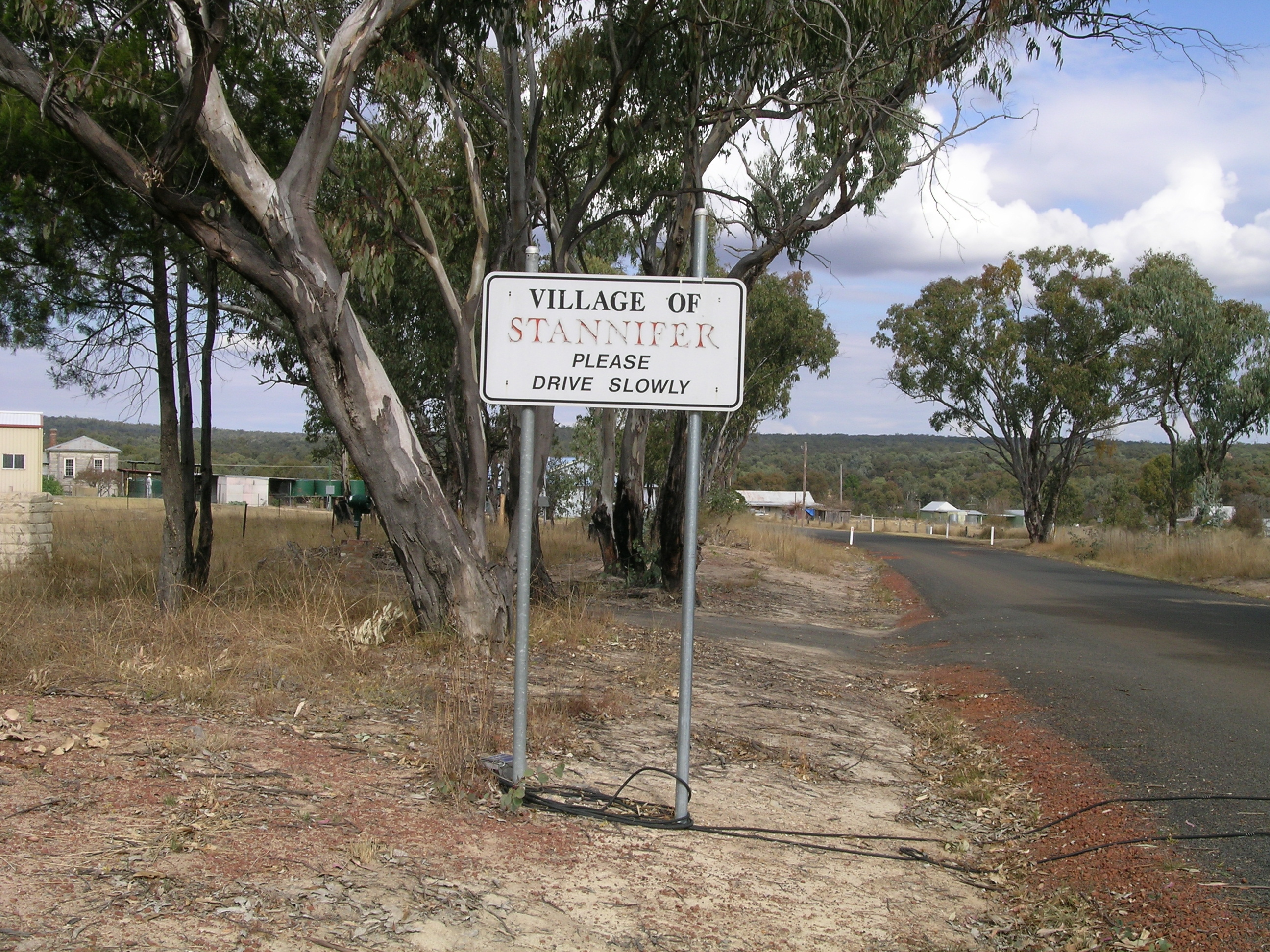
- Stannifer

- Coordinates: 29°53′S 151°13′E
- Population: 73 (2016 census)
- Postcode(s): 2369
- Elevation: 780 m (2,559 ft)
- Location: 603 km (375 mi) N of Sydney; 114 km (71 mi) NW of Armidale; 17 km (11 mi) SE of Inverell
- LGA(s): Inverell Shire
- County: Gough
- State electorate(s): Northern Tablelands
- Federal division(s): New England

Stannifer is a small rural village on the Northern Tablelands, New South Wales, Australia. The village is situated nine kilometres north of Tingha, New South Wales, on the Elsmore Road, and is within Inverell Shire. Middle Creek, a tributary of the Macintyre River is nearby.

The village is several kilometres from the locality of Old Mill; both are old tin mining villages, with remnants of the mining past still visible in places and fossicking still carried on in local creek beds.

The main industries are mining, timber, fossicking and agriculture. Several varieties of gems can be found in the Stannifer fossicking area, including jellybeans, quartz and grass stone.

== History ==
Stannifer Post Office opened on 1 October 1880 and closed in 1973.

== References and source ==
- "Inverell Shire Information", c.1981
