= Wyndham Estate =

Winery in New South Wales, Australia

Coordinates: 32.6449761°S 151.4205051°E

Wyndham Estate was a leading winery in the Hunter Valley, in New South Wales, Australia. It was founded by George Wyndham, who came to Australia in 1827 and planted a vineyard around his home, Dalwood House. The winery won four gold medals, seven silver medals, and two bronze medals for its wines at the 1982 International Wine and Spirit Competition in England. The company was owned by Pernod Ricard Winemakers.

It closed in 2014. In 2016 the property was purchase by Iris Capital, who reverted the winery to its original 1828 establishment name Dalwood Estate.
