= Tingha Advocate and North-Western Journal =

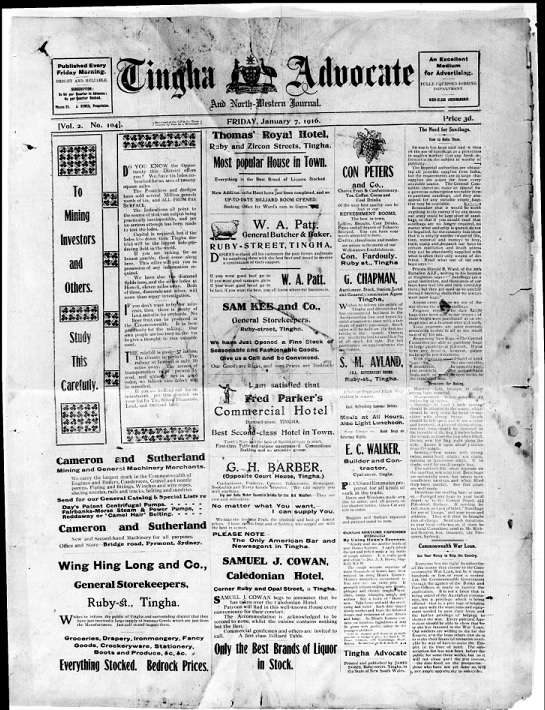
Cover of Tingha Advocate and North-Western Journal, 7 January 1916

The Tingha Advocate and North-Western Journal is an English language newspaper published in Tingha, New South Wales, Australia. It was published every Friday morning and described itself as being "bright and reliable".

== History ==
The Tingha Advocate and North-Western Journal was a weekly publication sold for 3 pence. The original paper consisted primarily of advertising and community news.

== Digitisation ==
The various versions of the paper have been digitised as part of the Australian Newspapers Digitisation Program project hosted by the National Library of Australia.

== See also ==
- List of newspapers in New South Wales
