= Tingha, New South Wales =

Tingha
- Town
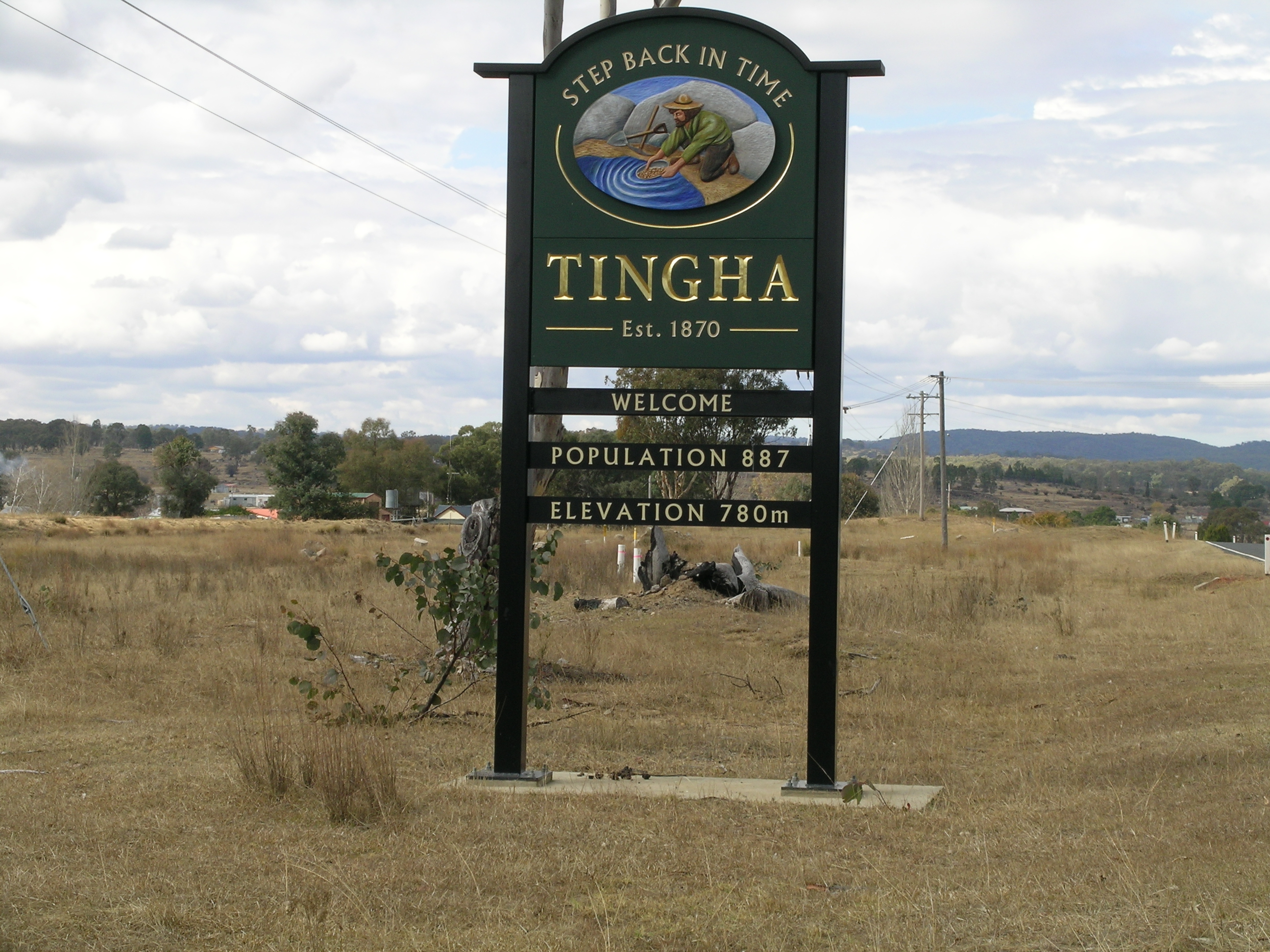
- Tingha entry sign

- Coordinates: 29°57′S 151°13′E
- Country: Australia
- State: New South Wales
- LGA: Inverell Shire
- Location: 30 km (19 mi) from Inverell; 63 km (39 mi) from Guyra; 437 km (272 mi) from Brisbane; 559 km (347 mi) from Sydney
- Established: 1885

Government
  - State electorate: Northern Tablelands
  - Federal division: New England
- Elevation: 780 m (2,560 ft)

Population
  - Total: 833 (2021 census)
- Postcode: 2369
- County: Hardinge

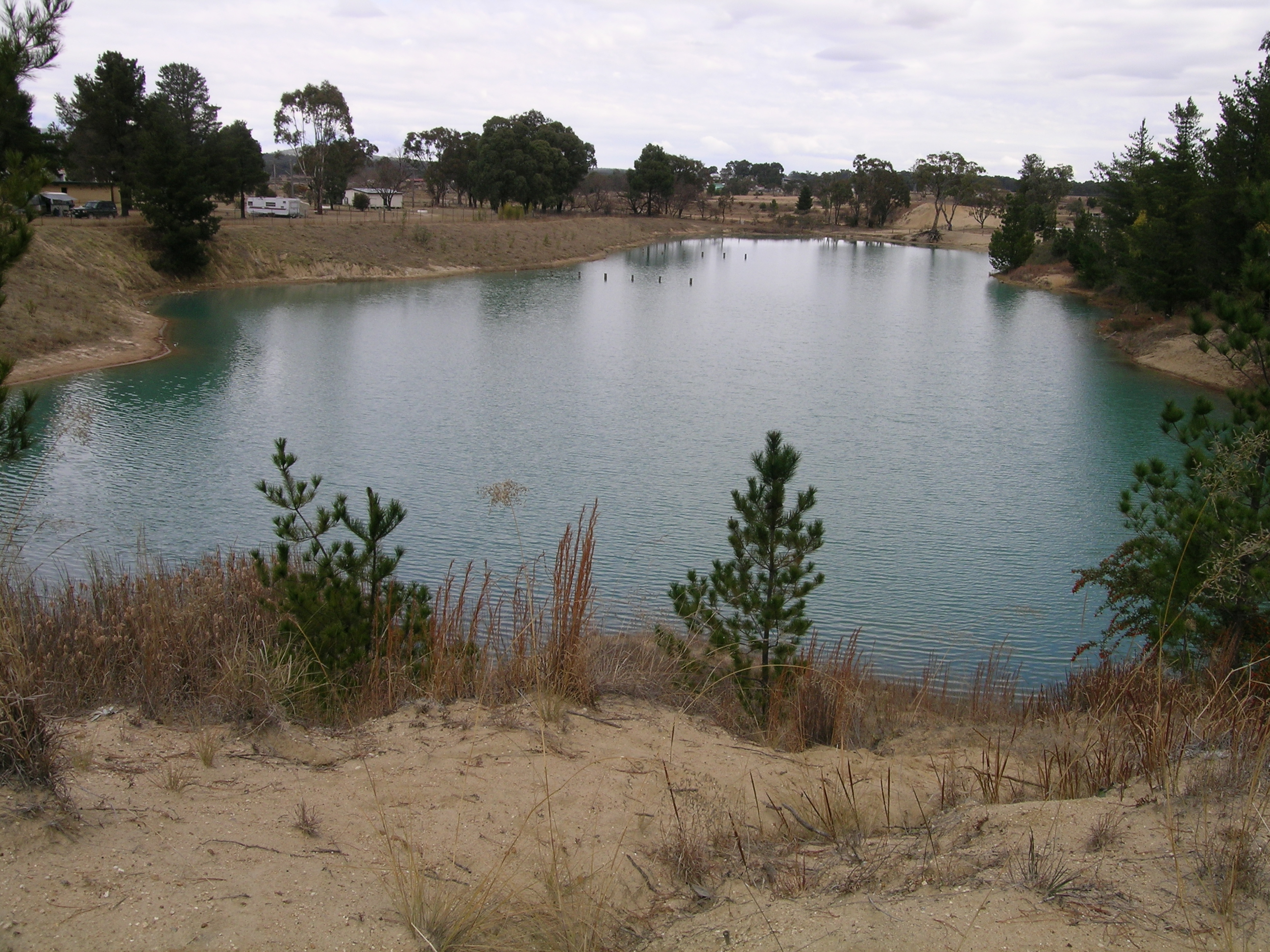
Swimming hole, Tingha

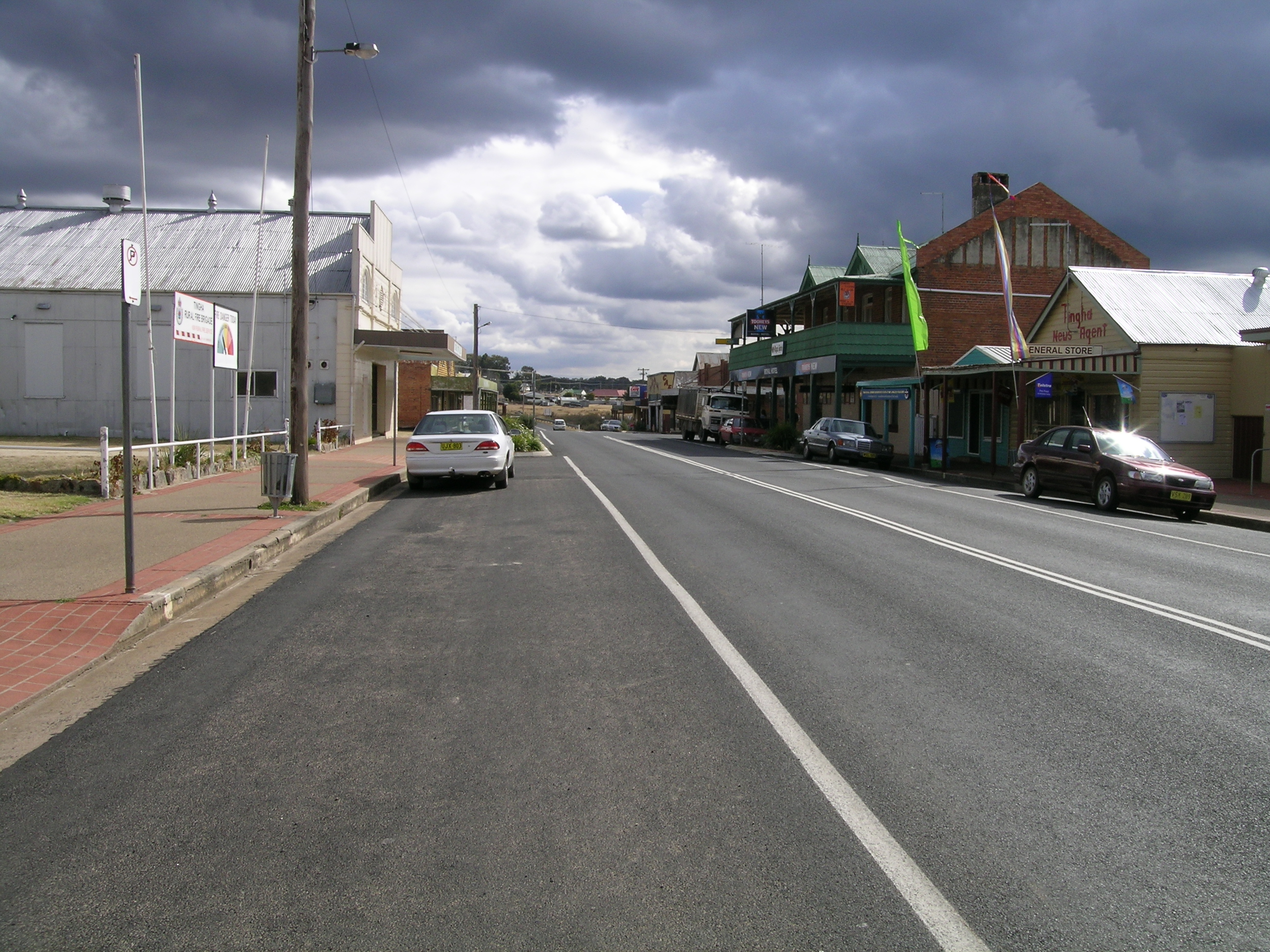
Main street, Tingha

Tingha is a small town on the Northern Tablelands, New South Wales, Australia in Inverell Shire. Formerly part of Armidale Region, on 1 July 2019, responsibility for Tingha was transferred from Armidale Regional Council to Inverell Shire Council. The town is 30 kilometres (19 mi) south of Inverell and 559 kilometres (347 mi) north-north-east of Sydney. Tingha is an Aboriginal word for "flat or level".

== History ==
Before non-indigenous settlement the area now known as Tingha was mainly lived upon by people from the Nucoorilma clan of the Gamilaroi Nation, which is an associated group of the Murri Aboriginal people. Many of their descendants still live in the surrounding area.

Tingha was first settled in 1841 by Sydney Hudson Darby and became a mining town after tin was discovered there in the 1870s. Within a year Australia's first commercial tin mines were operating at a private settlement known as Armidale Crossing. Around 5,000 people arrived and about 1000 of the miners were Chinese. The Wing Hing Long Museum is a reminder of that heritage, being established in the 1880s as a general store by Chinese storekeeper, Ah Lin. Armidale Crossing Post Office opened on 1 September 1872 and was renamed Tingha the next month.

The village was proclaimed a town in 1885. Initially there were enough readily accessible surface deposits to make a good living without using machinery as Chinese people did. The first school was established by the Sisters of St. Joseph in 1890. In the 1890s drought came to the district and the easily obtained deposits of tin were exhausted leading to a loss in population.

By the early 1900s the mining boom was over and Tingha's population had dwindled to just a few hundred people. Shortly after this, large companies moved into the area to mine the less accessible tin. Dredges were used in mining operations in the area.

The town was serviced by the Bundarra & Tingha Advocate newspaper, published in Bundarra, from 1900 to 1932. It was also serviced by the Tingha Advocate and North-Western Journal, published in Tingha, from 1916 to 1932.

Formerly part of the Guyra Shire and then the Armidale Region, on 1 July 2019, responsibility for Tingha was transferred from Armidale Regional Council to Inverell Shire Council.

== Heritage listings ==
Tingha has a number of heritage-listed sites, including:

- 10 Ruby Street: Wing Hing Long & Co. Store

== Today ==
The main industry nowadays is agriculture with some fossicking in the area. Tin dredging and mining has continued on a scale that varies according to international price fluctuations.

Tingha has a hospital, pre-school, primary school, caravan park, sports and recreation club, a first aid post, hotels plus other shops and services to supply daily needs. Tingha Tigers rugby league club have a large following and have produced several National Rugby League players. Tingha's "swimming hole" is a large man made pool which was once a mining excavation. One of the main attractions around Tingha is "Green Valley Farm" Entertainment Park. In 2018, the town's residents voted for the town to become a part of Inverell Shire Council area.

In February 2019 a bushfire that commenced by a lightning strike burnt 23,419 hectares (57,870 acres) and destroyed 13 homes and 44 outbuildings. A further six homes and 13 outbuildings were also damaged by the fire.

== Notable people ==
- Nathan Blacklock – a former Kangaroo, St George Illawarra Dragons, and Hull F.C. rugby league and Waratahs rugby union player
- Preston Campbell – a former Gold Coast Titans, Cronulla Sharks, Penrith Panthers, and Gold Coast Chargers rugby league player
- Owen Craigie – a former Newcastle Knights, Wests Tigers, South Sydney Rabbitohs, and Widnes rugby league player
- Bevan French – a former Parramatta Eels rugby league player who played junior rugby league for the Tingha Tigers, now playing in England for the Wigan Warriors
- Chris Lewis – a Melbourne Storm rugby league player who played junior rugby league for the Ashford Roosters

Historical population
Year	Pop.	±%
1966	272	—
1971	259	−4.8%
1976	868	+235.1%
1981	886	+2.1%
1986	837	−5.5%
1991	831	−0.7%
1996	732	−11.9%
2001	707	−3.4%
2006	713	+0.8%
2011	527	−26.1%
2016	476	−9.7%
2021	445	−6.5%
Source: Australian Bureau of Statistics data.
