= Branxton, New South Wales =

Branxton
- Town
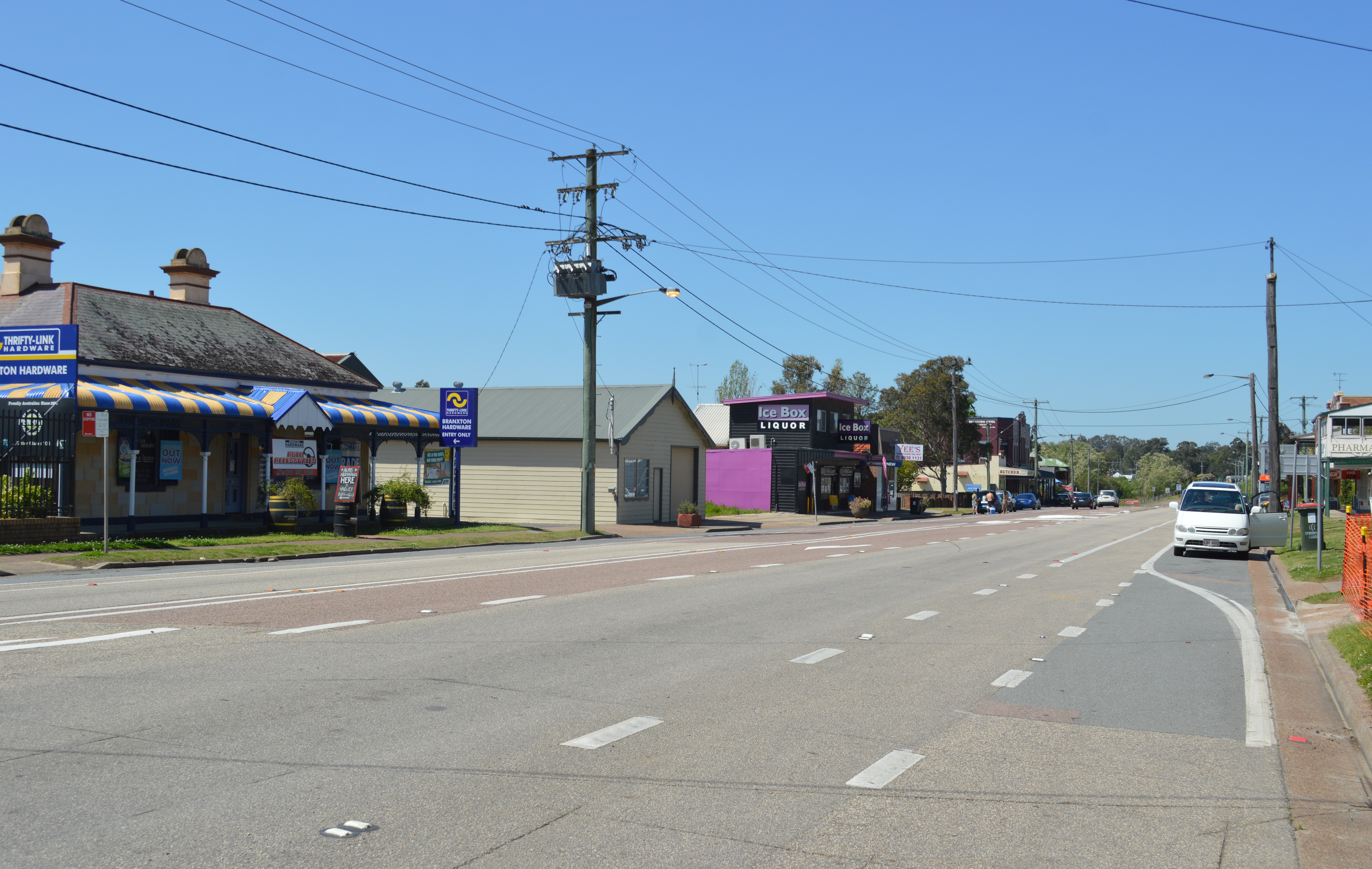
- New England Highway at Branxton

- Coordinates: 32°39′S 151°21′E
- Country: Australia
- State: New South Wales
- Region: Hunter Region
- LGAs: City of Cessnock; Singleton Council

Government
  - State electorates: Cessnock; Upper Hunter
  - Federal division: Hunter

Population
  - Total: 2,255 (2021 census)
- Postcode: 2335

Branxton is a town in the Hunter Region of New South Wales, Australia. Branxton is 171 kilometres (106 mi) north of Sydney via the Pacific Motorway and New England Highway. Branxton is located mostly in the City of Cessnock, but part of it is in Singleton Shire.

== History ==
Branxton lies on the Traditional Country of the Wonnarua people. In 1801 William Paterson (explorer) was the first European to sight the area when he travelled up the Hunter River as far as Dalwood. After colonisation, the township was initially referred to as Black Creek, but in 1848, its name was changed to Branxton as the developer believed that the Black Creek would not attract buyers. As settlers took up further land grants the township expanded capitalising on trade from settlers heading further north to settle the Liverpool Plains. By 1860 it was a village of 500 residents, a steam mill, post office, a mechanics institute and four hotels. 1860 also saw the main road being built by the general store, Victoria House. In 1865 a Methodist church was built. In 1871 St John's Anglican Church was built. In 1880 the police station was completed.

== Population ==
At the 2021 Census the population of Branxton was 2,255, of whom 2,025 were born in Australia, while 151 identified as Aboriginal or Torres Strait Islanders. The most common responses for religion were Catholic 22.4% and Anglican 11.9%, while No Religion jumped from 21.4% at the 2016 census to 32.8%.

At the 2016 census, Branxton had a population of 1,991.

== Transport ==
Branxton is located on the New England Highway between Maitland and Singleton. While the highway passes through the centre of the town, most through traffic bypasses via the Hunter Expressway.

An infamous road sign on one approach to the town states that Branxton has "two cemeteries no hospital". The sign, erected by the local Lions Club, is meant to act as a deterrent to rule-breaking motorists.

Branxton is located on the Main Northern railway line and has its own railway station, served by NSW TrainLink's Hunter line.

Hunter Valley Buses operates three bus routes through the village of Branxton:

- 179: Stockland Greenhills to North Rothbury via East Maitland, Maitland, Rutherford, Lochinvar, Greta
- 180: Stockland Greenhills to Singleton Heights via East Maitland, Maitland, Rutherford, Lochinvar, Greta and Singleton
- 180X: Maitland station to Singleton station via Lochinvar and Greta

== Wine history ==
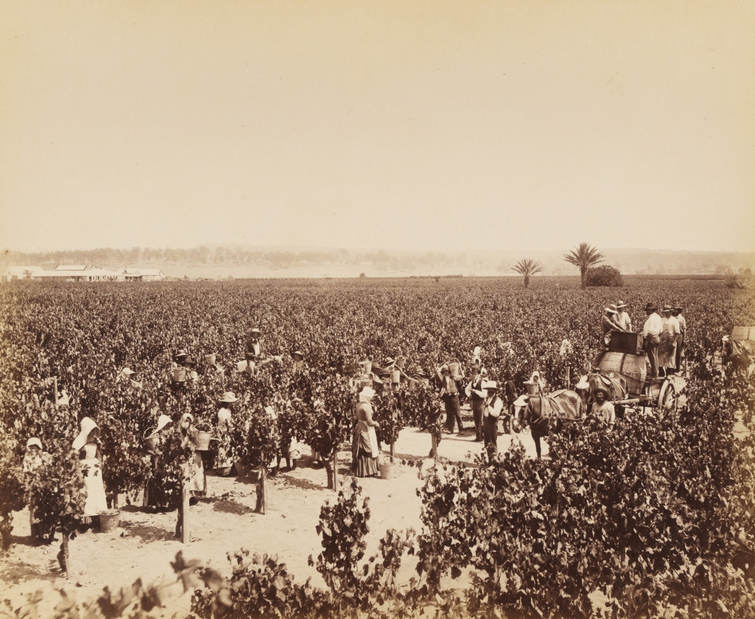
Dalwood Vineyards near Branxton, 1886

The Branxton region is considered one of the birthplaces of Australian wine. Located at the northern end of Wine Country Drive, it is the northern gateway to the world-renowned Hunter Valley wine country of Pokolbin and Rothbury.

Winemaker James Busby, widely regarded as the "father" of the Australian wine industry, planted his first grape vines on his property Kirkton, located at Belford in the Branxton district. He later sold 600 vines to George Wyndham, who arrived in 1827 after purchasing 2000 acres of land from David Maziere adjoining the Hunter River near to where William Paterson had explored 26 years earlier. His original homestead, Dalwood House, is preserved within the grounds of the modern Wyndham Estate complex is located five kilometres east of the current town. Management was eventually taken over by his son John who expanded the business, bringing it to international acclaim receiving awards at local and international exhibitions, including the Paris International Exhibition of 1867. The Wyndhams named some of their wines after local Aboriginal words such as Bukkulla. At the height of Dalwood's success, a set of promotional photographs of the vineyard were produced in 1886, which was presented to various local dignitaries, including Queen Victoria.

== Facilities ==
Branxton is a busy service township with a supermarket, medical centre, swimming school and an art school.

The town has several different sporting clubs. These include Greta-Branxton Colts Rugby League Football Club, Greta-Branxton Wildcats Soccer Club, Greta-Branxton United Cricket Club, and Branxton District Netball Club. Branxton also has facilities for tennis, croquet, golf and athletics.

There are two primary schools within Branxton; Branxton Public School, and Rosary Park Catholic School. There is no high school in the town, and most students attend high school in nearby Maitland, Singleton or Cessnock.

== Heritage listings ==
Branxton has a number of heritage-listed sites, including:

- Main Northern railway: Branxton railway station
- Dalwood Road: Dalwood House
