= Bundarra Police Station and Courthouse =

- Location within New South Wales Location within Australia
- 30°10′18″S 151°04′31″E
- Location: Oliver Street, Bundarra, Uralla Shire, New South Wales, Australia

History
- Built: 1869–1870

Site notes
- Architect: James Barnet
- Owner: Bundarra Community Purposes Reserve Trust

New South Wales Heritage Register
- Official name: Bundarra Police Station & Courthouse
- Type: State heritage (complex / group)
- Designated: 2 April 1999
- Reference no.: 229
- Type: Courthouse
- Category: Law Enforcement
- Builders: Alfred Dorrey

The Bundarra Police Station and Courthouse is a heritage-listed former police station and courthouse located at Oliver Street, Bundarra, in the New England region of New South Wales, Australia. It was designed by James Barnet and built from 1869 to 1870 by Alfred Doorey. The property is owned by Bundarra Community Purposes Reserve Trust. It was added to the New South Wales State Heritage Register on 2 April 1999.

== History ==
The site for a court house at Bundarra was fixed on 11 August 1855, and tenders called on 22 February 1869 for the erection of a court house and Watch House evidently in one combined building. On 9 April 1869 it was notified that Alfred Doorey was the successful tenderer for its construction to the design of James Barnet, the Colonial Architect, and the building was completed in 1870 at the cost of A£870 (original estimate A£900). The furniture cost 33 pound 14 shillings and 7 pence. Additions were recorded that year.

Barnet had further alterations made to the court house in 1883, tenders being called on 14 November 1882, with G. Ross being given as the successful tenderer on 29 January 1883. More additions became necessary and a local man G. E. Henry of Bundarra was shown on 25 September 1899, as the contractor the work on both the court house and watch house section which was under the direction of the Government Architect, Walter Liberty Vernon who had succeeded Barnet in 1890. Vernon then had further additions to both parts of the building carried out in 1901 by William S. Mead and Company of Annandale, whose tender was given as accepted on 29 July 1901.

More recently in 1938, a timber verandah addition was made on the north west corner of the Police residence section under a former Government Architect, Cobden Parkes. It would appear that a substantial part of the building dates from 1870 though the alterations and additions over the years evidently changed the internal planning thus the attached plan shows the relocation of the barrack room from the south side of the north west.

== Description ==
The building is a single-storey brick building (in English bond brick) built in 1870 (with various alterations in 1883, 1889, 1901 and 1938) with timber floors and timber framed corrugated galvanised iron sheeted roof. Internal walls are plaster or timber boarding generally. From the spacing of the roof battens it appears the roof sheeting was originally slates. The building contains 16 rooms (including the Court Room and two cells) and two verandahs, and is built on a slightly elevated site above the main road through Bundarra (Uralla-Inverell Road).

=== Condition ===
As at 8 May 2017, the building was in generally fair to good condition structurally, and the interior has been renovated since 1987.

== Heritage listing ==
As at 19 September 2003, the former Bundarra Police Station and Court House is significant because the building embodies the establishment, growth and evolution of one of the major influential public departments of NSW. The responsibilities and duties of this Department were of fundamental importance to the development of law enforcement after the introduction of the Police Regulation Act of 1862 NSW. The former Bundarra Police Station Court House has close associations with the development of the Region as a centre for Law Administration. The building also has close association with the Colonial Architect's Office and may be used to demonstrate the design philosophy of that Office in rural regions. The former Bundarra Police Station and Court House is a particularly well-known urban landmark in the town of Bundarra and makes a major contribution to the streetscape qualities of the Bendemeer and Oliver Streets Precinct. The quality of workmanship and the unique use of elements in this building has produced a pleasing and esteemed visual aesthetic. The building is a rare and unusual example of a "modified Victorian Georgian" style reminiscent of the earliest Australian buildings idioms into a system based on a utilitarian scale and use. The quality of the design, including its proportions, details and character are of a high standard. The inclusion of the former Bundarra Police Station and Court House on a number of Federal and local heritage registers underscores its widespread importance as an item of cultural heritage to the local and wider community. This importance is further demonstrated by the efforts of the Bundarra community and the Shire Council to development the "place" as a cultural tourist attraction demonstrating the importance of early Bundarra as a service centre and in law administration in this part of New South Wales.

The Bundarra Police Station and Courthouse was listed on the New South Wales State Heritage Register on 2 April 1999 having satisfied the following criteria.

The place is important in demonstrating the course, or pattern, of cultural or natural history in New South Wales.

The former Bundarra Police Station and Court House embodies the establishment, growth and evolution of one of the major influential public departments of NSW. The responsibilities and duties of this Department were of fundamental importance to the development of law enforcement after the introduction of the Police Regulation Act of 1862 NSW. The former Bundarra Police Station and Court House has close associations with the development of the Region as a centre for Law Administration. The building also has close association with the Colonial Architect's Office and may be used to demonstrate the design philosophy of that Office in rural regions.

The place is important in demonstrating aesthetic characteristics and/or a high degree of creative or technical achievement in New South Wales.

The former Bundarra Police Station-Court House is a particularly well-known urban landmark in the town of Bundarra and makes a major contribution to the streetscape qualities of the Bendemeer and Oliver Streets Precinct. The quality of workmanship and the unique use of elements in this building has produced a pleasing and esteemed visual aesthetic. The building is a rare and unusual example of a "modified Victorian Georgian" style reminiscent of the earliest Australian buildings idioms into a system based on a utilitarian scale and use. The quality of the design, including its proportions, details and character are of a high standard.

The place has a strong or special association with a particular community or cultural group in New South Wales for social, cultural or spiritual reasons.

The inclusion of the former Bundarra Police Station and Court House on a number of Federal and local heritage registers underscores its widespread importance as an item of "cultural heritage" to the local and wider community. This importance is further demonstrated by the efforts of the Bundarra community and the Shire Council to development the "place" as a cultural tourist attraction demonstrating the importance of early Bundarra as a service centre and in law administration in this part of New South Wales.
