= Bundarra, New South Wales =

Bundarra New South Wales
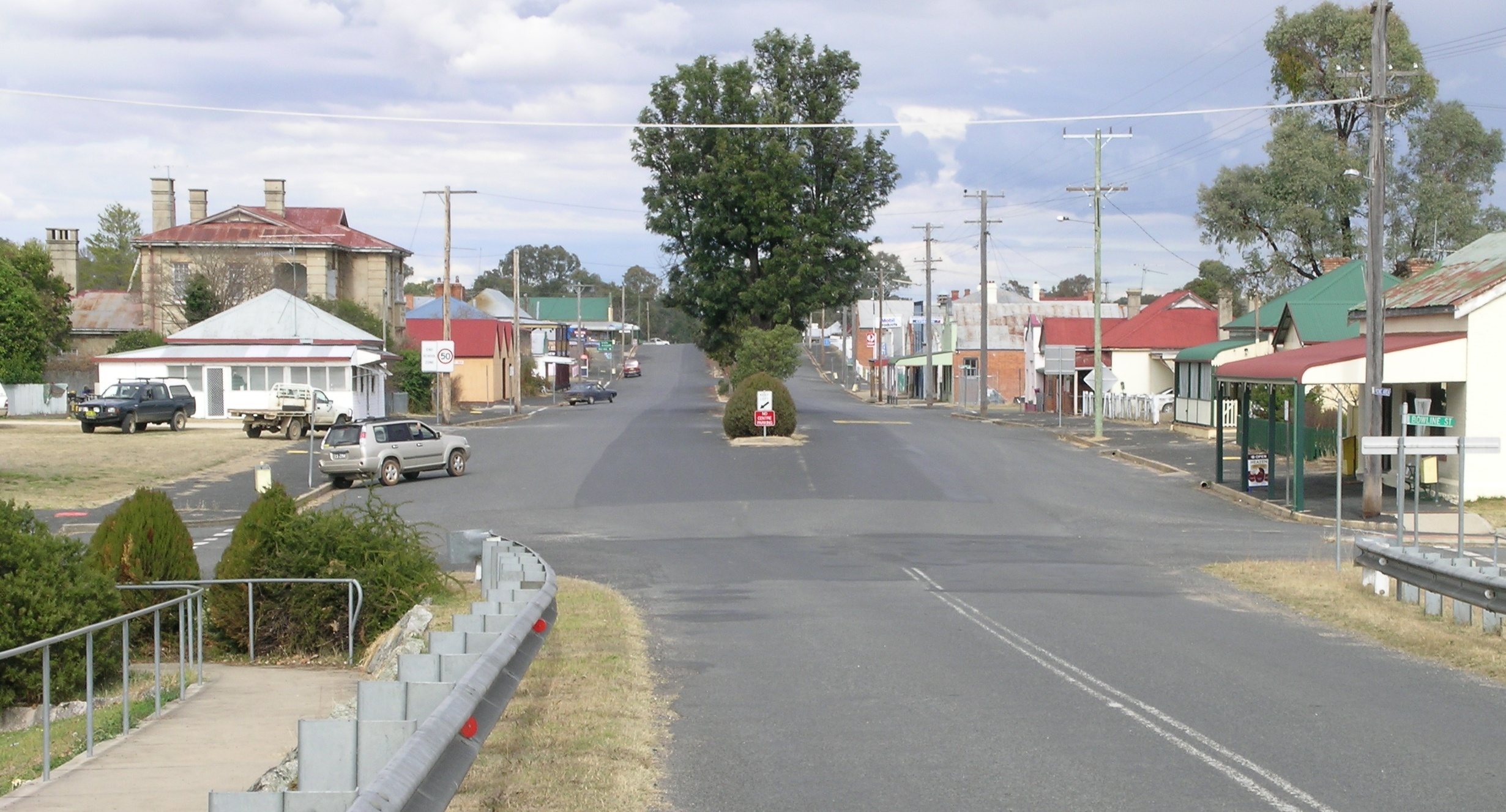
- Thunderbolts Way

- Coordinates: 30°10′0″S 151°04′0″E
- Population: 676 (2016 census)
- Postcode(s): 2359
- Elevation: 660 m (2,165 ft)
- Location: 563 km (350 mi) NW of Sydney; 82 km (51 mi) NW of Armidale; 51 km (32 mi) S of Inverell; 76 km (47 mi) NW of Uralla; 66 km (41 mi) ENE of Barraba
- LGA(s): Uralla Shire
- County: Hardinge
- State electorate(s): Northern Tablelands
- Federal division(s): New England
Mean max temp	Mean min temp	Annual rainfall
23.0 °C; 73 °F	7.6 °C; 46 °F	765.4 mm 30.1 in

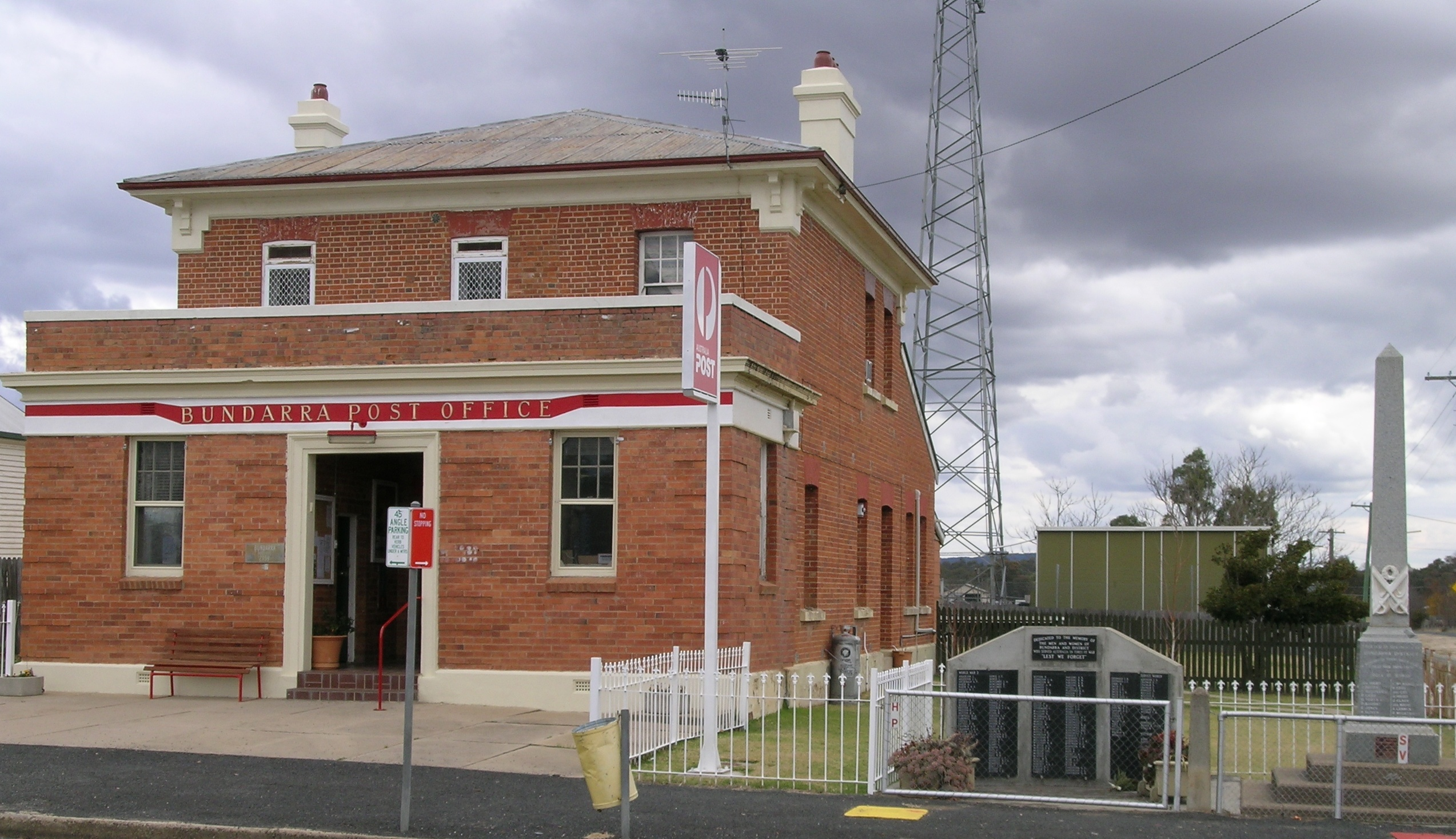
Former Post office and war memorial

Bundarra is a small town on the Northern Tablelands of New South Wales, Australia. The town is located on Thunderbolts Way and on the banks of the Gwydir River, in the Uralla Shire local government area, 563 kilometres (350 mi) from the state capital, Sydney. The name Bundarra is also applied to the surrounding rural area for postal and statistical purposes. At the 2016 census, Bundarra had a population of 394 and the surrounding area had 676 persons.

== History ==
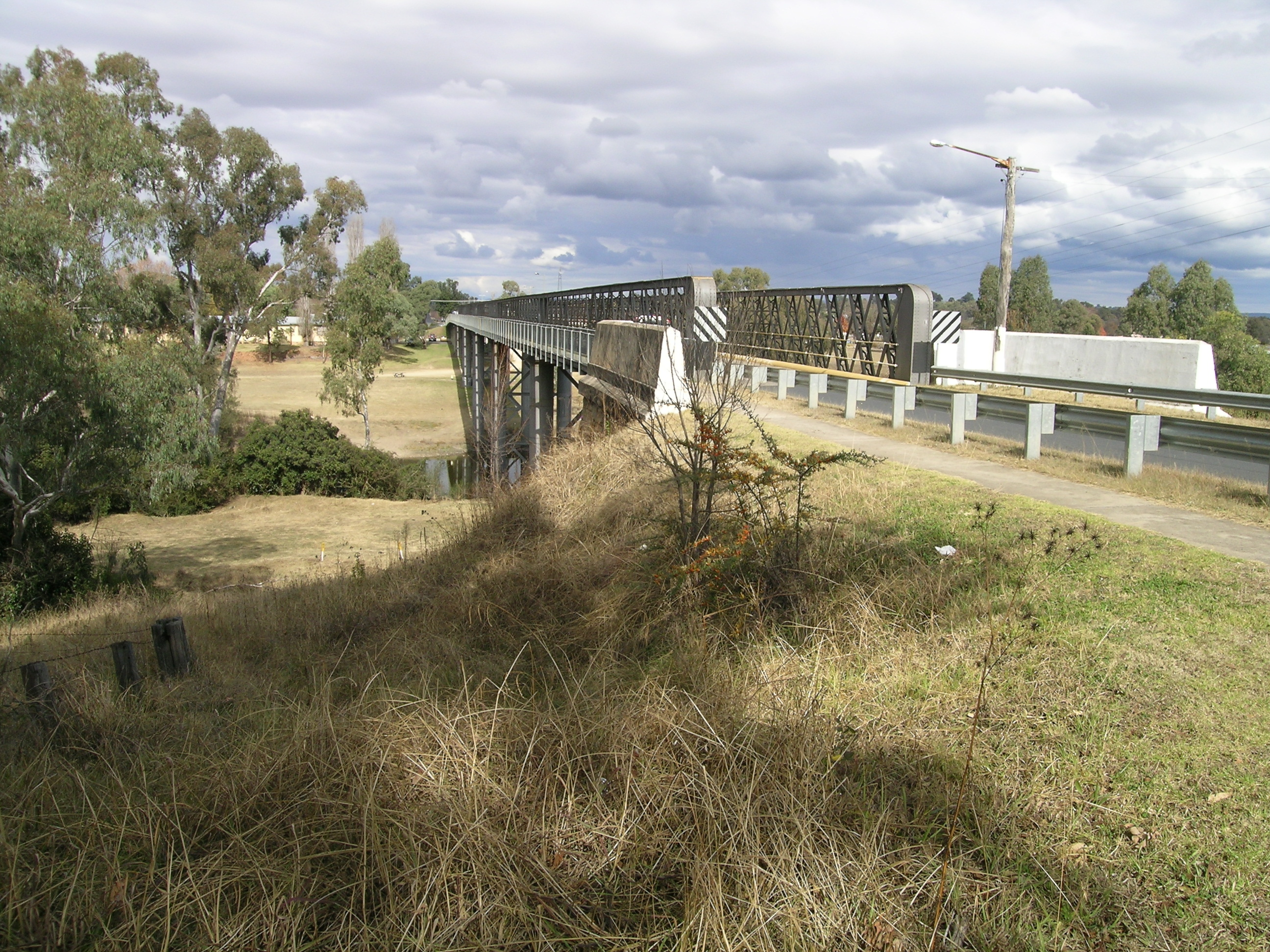
Gwydir River bridge

Bundarra is named for the Kamilaroi word for the grey kangaroo. Kamilaroi and Anaiwan people were the earliest inhabitants of the Bundarra area. A local hill nearby Bundarra called "Rumbling Mountain" is the subject of an Aboriginal myth that attempts to explain its periodic rumbling and shaking.

Bundarra Station was founded in 1836 by Edward G. Clerk and a hotel and store were established on the future townsite. A church was constructed on the site in 1857 around the same time as the town survey. The old buildings in Bundarra’s main street were constructed between 1860 and 1880. A school was established in 1869, becoming a central school in 1955. The Roman Catholic convent was built in 1908 and a newspaper, the Bundarra Advocate was founded. At one stage the town included three hotels. three stores, three butchers and a bank. Copper and gold were also found in the area. The bushranger, Fred Ward, known as Captain Thunderbolt, stole two horses belonging to a police inspector from Abington station, near Bundarra in 1868.

The Bundarra bridge, a five-span iron lattice truss bridge, was constructed in 1881. The bridge, crossing the Gwydir River, is 204 metres in length and 5.6 metres wide between kerbs. The bridge has been listed on the Register of the National Estate, being of state significance due to its design, historical value and aesthetic appearance. The bridge was the focus of a large community celebration for its centenary and is still in use today.

The historic townscape of Bundarra led to the town hosting some on location filming for the Fred Schepisi directed film, The Chant of Jimmie Blacksmith, based on the Booker Prize shortlisted novel by Thomas Keneally.

The town was serviced by the Bundarra & Tingha Advocate newspaper, published in Bundarra, from 1900 to 1932.

== Heritage listings ==
Bundarra has a number of heritage-listed sites, including:

- Oliver Street: Bundarra Police Station and Courthouse

Bundarra Police Station and Courthouse (former) together with The Basin Nature Reserve, Baldersleigh Road have been placed on the (now defunct) Register of the National Estate.

== Fauna ==
Bundarra is part of the Bundarra-Barraba Important Bird Area which is home to one of only three breeding areas in New South Wales for the endangered regent honeyeater. The colony consists of around 30 birds of around 1,500 remaining in total. Platypuses can be seen in the Gwydir River at Bundarra near the Bundarra bridge.

== Facilities ==
The town today includes a K-12 central school, police station, two churches, the Grace Munro Centre (a state of the art aged care facility), an agricultural supplies store, garage, hotel, sporting club and golf course, rural transaction centre (with Centrelink access), community technology centre, general store/bottle shop/newsagent/gift shop and a takeaway store that is open seven days a week. The General Store operates as a basic post service too, with the full post office closing in August 2016. Camping is possible at the camping ground with powered sites and hot shower facilities, and at a free site on the edge of town and on the river.

Annual events in town include the Agricultural show in January, the Goat Races in April and the rodeo in November.

There are good fishing spots along the Gwydir River where it is possible to catch some Murray cod.
