= Sandifer =

Sandifer is a surname. Notable people with the surname include:

- Bill Sandifer (born 1952), American football player
- Cecil T. Sandifer (1923–2022), American politician and funeral director
- Dan Sandifer (1927–1987), American football player
- Phillip Sandifer (born 1959), American writer, recording artist and producer
- Robert Sandifer (1983–1994), American murder victim

== See also ==
- Sandifer syndrome
