= Bundarra & Tingha Advocate =

English-language newspaper (1900–1932)

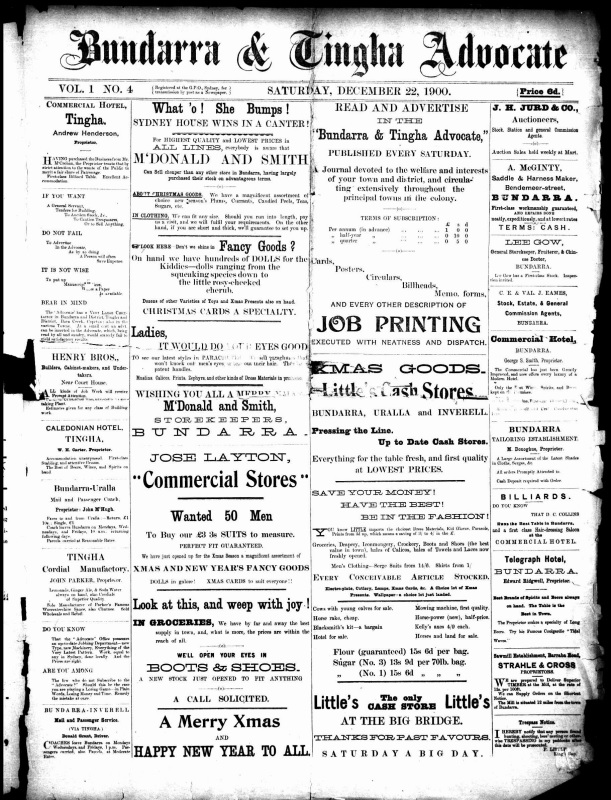
Front cover of the Bundarra & Tingha Advocate on 22 December 1900

The Bundarra and Tingha Advocate was an English language newspaper published in Bundarra, New South Wales. It was published from 1900 to 1932.

== History ==
The Bundarra and Tingha Advocate was established on 1 December 1900. It was also referred to as the Bundarra Advocate. Between 1900 and 1906 it was edited by Frank Walter Vincent Jnr.

== Digitisation ==
The various versions of the paper have been digitised as part of the Australian Newspapers Digitisation Program project hosted by the National Library of Australia.

== See also ==
- List of newspapers in Australia
- List of newspapers in New South Wales
