= Wallangra, New South Wales =

Wallangra New South Wales
- Coordinates: 29°15′9″S 150°53′5″E
- Population: 99 (2016 census)
- Postcode(s): 2360
- LGA(s): Inverell Shire
- County: Arrawatta
- State electorate(s): Northern Tablelands
- Federal division(s): New England

Wallangra is a village in New South Wales, Australia. In the 2016 census, the village had a population of 99 people.
