= Bukkulla, New South Wales =

Bukkulla New South Wales
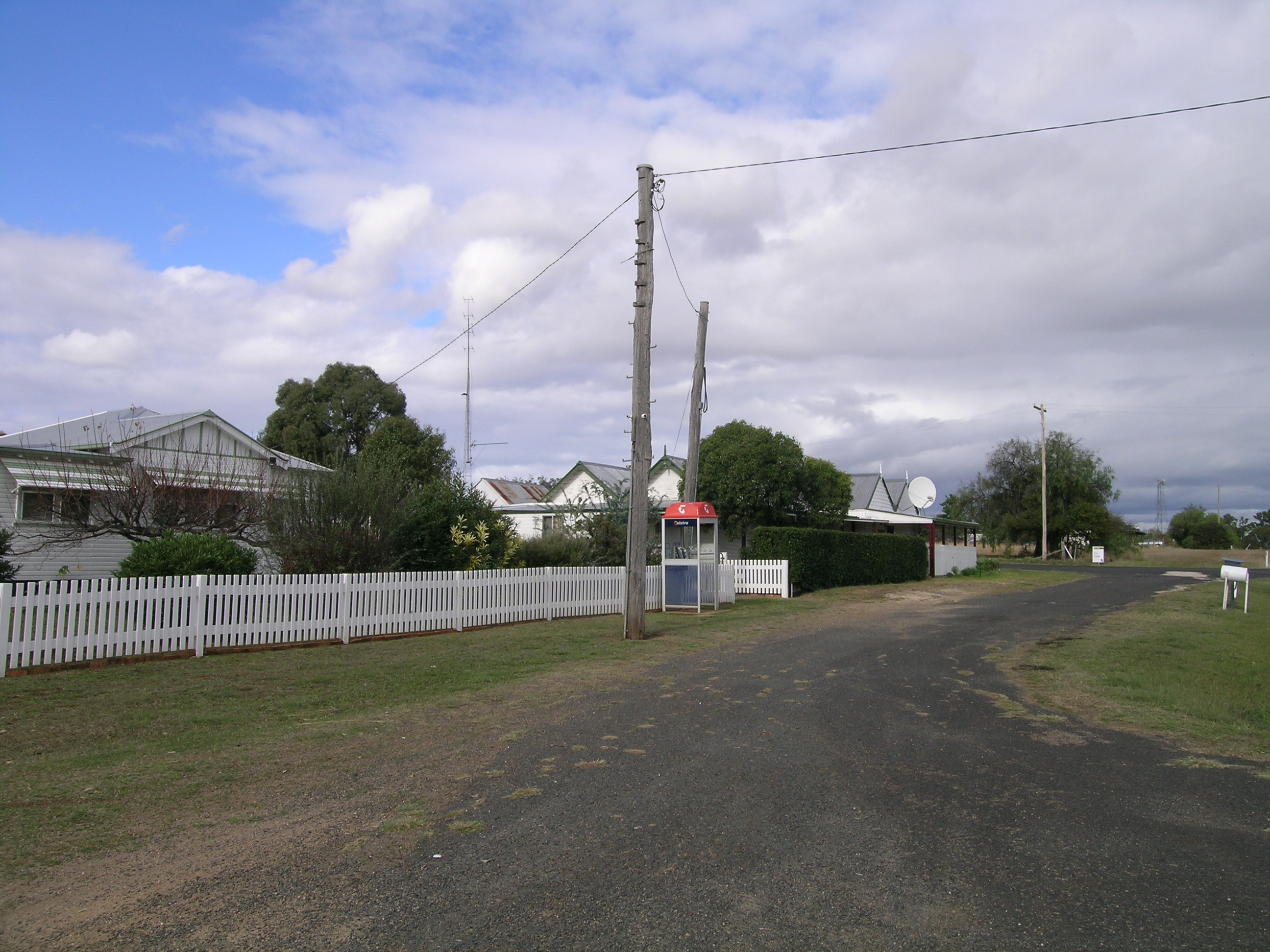
- Bukkulla

- Coordinates: 29°30′S 150°07′E
- Population: 145 (2006 census)
- Postcode(s): 2360
- Elevation: 580 m (1,903 ft)
- Location: 637 km (396 mi) N of Sydney; 414 km (257 mi) SW of Brisbane; 160 km (99 mi) NW of Armidale; 34 km (21 mi) N of Inverell
- LGA(s): Inverell Shire
- County: Arrawatta
- State electorate(s): Northern Tablelands
- Federal division(s): New England

Bukkulla is a hamlet about 30 kilometres (19 mi) north of Inverell and north-east of Bannockburn on the Ashford Road. This hamlet is within the boundaries of Arrawatta County and Inverell Shire, New South Wales, Australia. The village is at an elevation of about 580 metres. In the 2006 census, there were 145 persons usually resident in the Bukkulla area.

== History ==
Bukkulla was the name of the 130,000-acre (530 km^{2}) property of George Wyndham (1801–1870) and means 'place of leopard tree' or a ‘high black stump’. Wyndham was the first official licensee when he held the Macintyre River property in 1839. The 1841 census recorded Bukkulla as having 3 free males, 1 convict there. Wyndham started a vineyard there along with a Thoroughbred horse stud which bred some good horses. The Bukkulla stud also produced some good stockhorses and horses for the Indian trade, too. In 1850 there were 300 horses, 2,000 cattle and 7,000 sheep on Bukkulla. The property was later subdivided by Wyndham Brothers into Karoola, Redbank, Arthur's Seat, Dinton Vale and Westholme, etc.

Bukkulla Post Office opened on 1 April 1876 and closed in 1980.

The district's primary industries are sheep and beef cattle breeding.

The village now has a sports ground, a public telephone, several homes and a communications tower. Macintyre Station is nearby.
