= Lonnie Standifer =

American entomologist

Lonnie N. Standifer
- Born: October 28, 1926; Itasca, Texas
- Died: 14 March 1996 (aged 69); Fort Worth, Texas
- Education: Prairie View A & M University; Kansas State University; Cornell University
- Known for: Research on bee physiology and nutrition; Director of USDA Bee Research Center
- Scientific career
- Fields: Entomology

Lonnie Nathaniel Standifer (1926–1996) was an entomologist born in Itasca, Texas. An expert in honey bee physiology and nutrition, in 1970 he became the first African-American scientist to be appointed director of the USDA's Carl Hayden Bee Research Center.

== Early life and education ==
Standifer was born in Itasca, Texas on October 28, 1926. He was one of the 10 children of Emma and Nathaniel Standifer.

Standifer gained a Bachelor of Science degree from Prairie View A & M University in Texas in 1949, a Masters of Science from Kansas State University in 1951, and a PhD from Cornell University in 1954. The title of his dissertation was "Laboratory Studies on the Toxicity of Selected Chlorinated Hydrocarbon and Phosphate Chemicals to Third Instar Larvae of the House Fly, Musta Domestica Linn".

== Career and research ==
Standifer taught at Tuskegee University, Cornell University, and Southern University before moving to the USDA's Agricultural Research Service in Tucson, Arizona in 1956. He was promoted to a research position in 1960, and appointed director of the USDA's Carl Hayden Bee Research Center in Tucson in 1970.

The Bee Research Center was the largest bee research facility in the United States. Standifer followed Frank Edward Todd and Marshall Levin as leader, the first African-American to be appointed director. The center's focus had been on pesticides and bees, and Standifer added bee nutrition to its research program. Standifer held the position until 1981 and he retired for health reasons in his 50s (in 1983).

His work on bees was published in several journals, including Journal of Agricultural Research, American Bee Journal, Apidologie, and the Annals of the Entomological Society of America. He was a member of the Entomological Society of America and the American Association for the Advancement of Science. He was also a counselor member of the Tucson Council for Civic Unity.

== Personal life ==
Standifer married Blanche Hazel Jackson, a nurse and Meharry Medical College alum. They divorced in 1963. He died after a prolonged illness on March 14, 1996, in Fort Worth, Texas.

== Photo ==
- In obituary in American Entomologist
