= George Wyndham (winemarker) =

English-Australian cricketer, farmer, wine-grower, and pastoralist

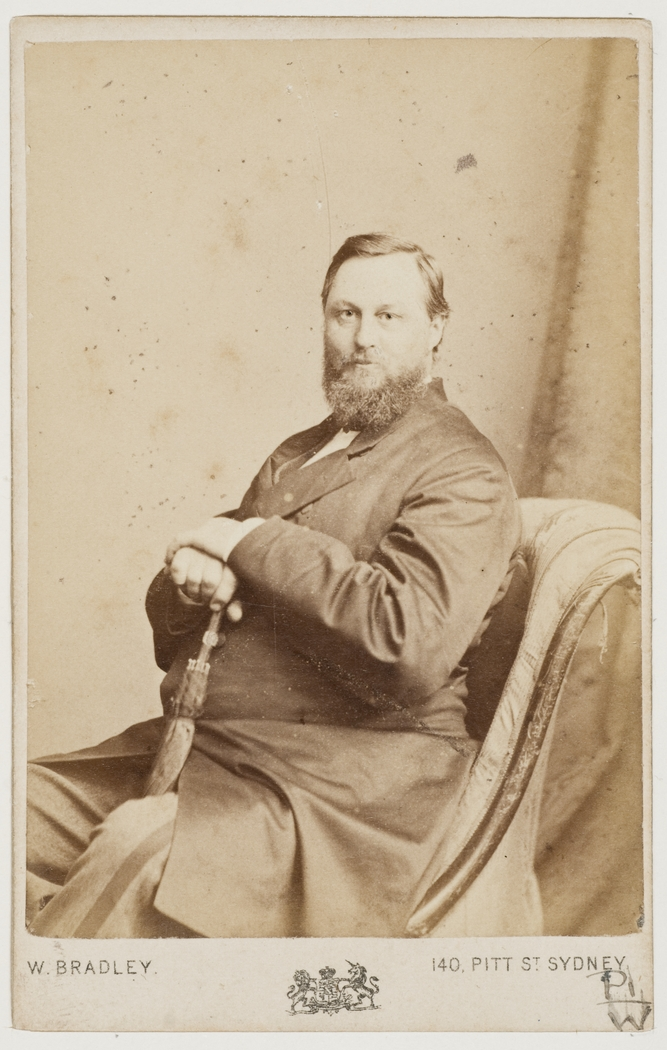
- His son John Wyndham, June 1869

Personal information
- Born: 20 June 1801; Dinton, Wiltshire, England
- Died: 24 December 1870 (aged 69); Sydney, New South Wales, Australia

Domestic team information
- Years: Team
- 1820–1821: Cambridge University
- Source: CricketArchive, 31 March 2013

George Wyndham (20 June 1801 – 24 December 1870) was an English farmer, wine-grower and pastoralist; he is famous for having established the Wyndham wineries and his estate Dalwood in the Hunter Valley, where he planted Australia's first commercial Shiraz vineyard. He was a cricketer in England during his youth.

== Early life ==
Born in 1801 in Dinton, Wiltshire England, Wyndham was the third son of William Wyndham and Letitia, née Popham. He was educated at Harrow School and Trinity College, Cambridge with the goal to enter the Church of England.

He is recorded as playing cricket for Cambridge University in two matches in 1820 and 1821, totalling 12 runs with a highest score of 6 and taking 7 wickets.

In 1824 Wyndham emigrated to Canada, traveling with John Galt the secretary of the Canada Company. While travelling through Paris, Marseilles, Nice, Genoa, Florence, Rome and Naples he studied viticulture to learn how to make wine. He reached Malta where illness forced him to return to Rome.

== Immigrating to Australia ==
Refusing a post under the British government out of opposition to its policies, he instead emigrated to Australia as a farmer. He decided to work as a Colonial Officer and was offered a free grant of 640 acres for every £500 of capital. With £3,000 his father had advanced him, together with several servants, their goods and chattels, sheep, cattle, horses, pigs and hounds, Wyndham and his wife Margaret set sail on the George from London on 17 August 1827. After a stop in Hobart, they arrived in Sydney on 26 December. Just weeks after arriving in Sydney, he brought land in the Hunter Valley.

== Establishing Dalwood ==
He settled near Branxton, where Wyndham purchased the 2000 acres for £1,200, renaming it Dalwood after one of his father's farms at Dinton.

According to his diary he grew crops of maize, wheat, hemp, mustard, castor oil, tobacco, millet and barley. Although George brought a Southdown ram and some ewes with him in 1827, he did not take up sheep raising seriously until the end of 1832 when he purchased a flock of local sheep and sent them to Mahngarinda.

By 1830 George had 70 acres of wheat but lost 60 of them with rust and the 600 vine cuttings. In December, 1831 a devastating hailstorm wrecked the tobacco, maize and vegetables. A week later a bushfire destroyed the grass and much of the post and rail fencing. He grew over 70 varieties of grapes.

In 1830 he planted the Australia's first commercial Shiraz vineyard. At the time the vineyard was the second largest in New South Wales. Some of these Shiraz vines were producing wine until 1966 making them the oldest wine producing vines in the world. Achieving international acclaim, including bronze and silver medal in the Paris International Exhibition in 1867

He named some of his wines in the language of the Wonnarua people, such as Bukkulla.

The labour crisis of 1840 hit Dalwood hard. In 1845 Wyndham left Dalwood under the care of the manager. With his family, a few livestock and stock men, he traveled the New England plateau to the Richmond River went to Keelgryrah. In 1846 recrossed the Dividing Range, Wyndham took up a property of 40,000 acres near Inverell named Bukkulla as well as 30,000 acres in the Inverell district named and Nullamanna.

In 1847 prices increased and they returned to Dalwood. Bukkulla was worked in conjunction with the Dalwood vineyard. His son John eventually took over management. Wyndham describes planting and tending his crops, weather conditions, the building and maintenance of his property, and relationships with family, workers and the Indigenous people.

Wyndham's legacy is as a significant pioneer of the wine industry in Australia, due to his ability to find the best grapes to suit the local area and conditions.

== Political career ==
In England he was seen as radical advocating for religious tolerance, parliamentary reform and abolition of the Corn Laws and tithes. He supported the rights of squatters. Supported Governor Sir Ralph Darling against William Charles Wentworth. He was a signatory to a petition to seeking the importation of coolie labour. He campaigned for wine to be served on trains refreshment wines after receiving a letter from John L Castnez, with the law eventually being changed.

In 1828 he was appointed an alternate member of the Legislative Council. In 1829 he was then appointed justice of the peace. In 1837 he was elected chairman of the bench in Maitland. He served a magistrate in Maitland but refused a seat in the Legislative council in 1839. He was elected chairman of the Maitland Branch of Australian Immigration Association in 1842 becoming a member of Maitland District Council the following year. He then became a member of the Hunter River Vineyard Association in 1867.

== Personal life ==
He met his wife Margaret Jay in Italy in 1825. They were married at the Ambassador's Chapel, Brussels on 26 April 1827. The couple had 12 sons and two daughters.

His published writings include The Impending Crisis (Maitland, 1851), and On the Land Policy of New South Wales (Maitland, 1866).

He died in Sydney on 24 December 1870 and was buried at a private cemetery on his property at Dalwood.

== Bibliography ==
- Haygarth, Arthur (1862). Scores & Biographies, Volume 1 (1744–1826). Lillywhite.
