= Graman, New South Wales =

Graman New South Wales
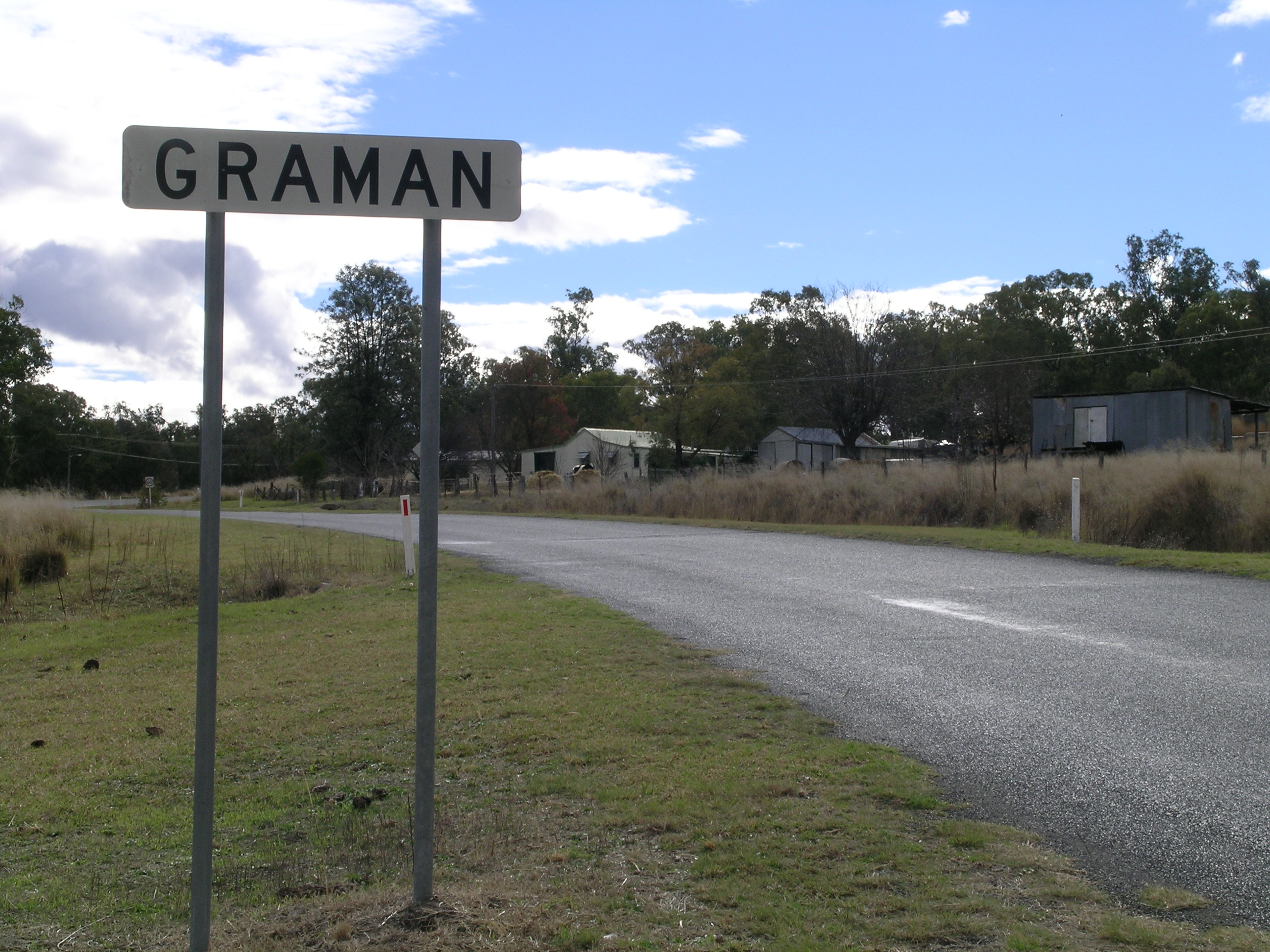
- Township sign

- Coordinates: 29°28′S 150°56′E
- Population: 103 (2016 census)
- Postcode(s): 2360
- LGA(s): Inverell Shire
- County: Arrawatta
- State electorate(s): Northern Tablelands
- Federal division(s): New England

Graman is a small village nestled on the banks of Graman Creek, 40 km northwest of Inverell and 25 km from Ashford in Inverell Shire, New South Wales, Australia. The village is situated on the Inverell to Yetman road at elevation of about 606 metres. Graman is in Arrawatta County. At the 2016 census, it recorded a population of 103 people.

The area surrounding Graman is an agricultural area producing grains, sheep and beef cattle.

The village has a Community Church, a public school, a New South Wales Rural Fire Service station, sports ground, tennis courts and the Graman Hotel which was established in 1876. Graman Post Office opened on 16 August 1880 and closed in 1989.

Older children from Graman generally attend schools in Inverell or Delungra. The timber Catholic Church was sold in 1994 and is now a private home.

The first record of European exploration of this area came in 1818, followed by a botanist despatched by the Governor to survey the land and ascertain its suitability for settlement. When news of the discovery of these rich pasture lands had reached England, emigration to the colony began. These pioneers began to look further afield, to the unoccupied land beyond the Range where the Government were powerless to prevent occupation. In 1836 a compromise had to be made by the Government who by 1846 began to issue licences to the squatters on which was now classed as Crown Land. Hugh Gordon laid the foundation for a vast sheep empire in 1839 when he leased ‘Strathbogie’. In 1860–61 in NSW two Land Acts were passed. The Acts provided prospective purchasers to pay one quarter of the purchase price and pay the rest over three years. This opened up the area and the population grew, with stations employing many workers.
