= Yetman, New South Wales =

Yetman New South Wales
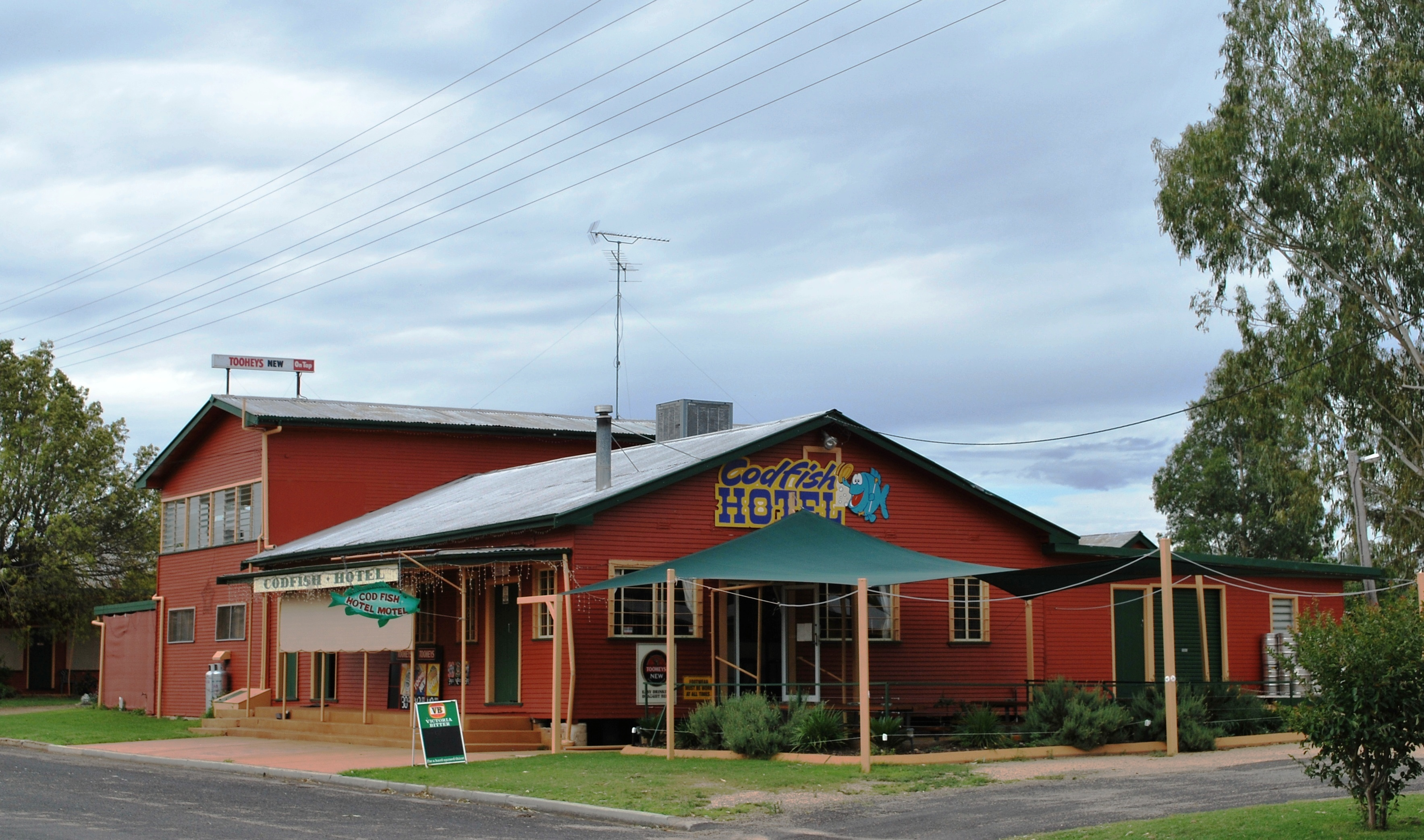
- The Codfish Hotel

- Coordinates: 28°54′S 150°47′E
- Population: 207 (2016 census)
- Postcode(s): 2410
- Elevation: 257 m (843 ft)
- Location: 701 km (436 mi) N of Sydney; 364 km (226 mi) SW of Brisbane; 207 km (129 mi) SW of Warwick; 118 km (73 mi) N of Inverell; 42 km (26 mi) W of Texas (QLD)
- LGA(s): Inverell Shire
- State electorate(s): Northern Tablelands
- Federal division(s): New England

Yetman is a hamlet in the New England region of northern New South Wales, Australia. At the 2006 census, Yetman and the surrounding area had a population of 178. It is located on the Macintyre River about 30 kilometres (19 mi) south of the Queensland border and 701 kilometres (436 mi) north of Sydney. It is located at the intersection of the roads south to Tamworth, east to Tenterfield and north-west to Boggabilla.

== History ==
The area was once occupied by the Bigambul, a sub-group of the Murri Aboriginal people who used to fish along the Macintyre River. Yetman Station was established in 1837 by the Dights, who followed Allan Cunningham's trail to the north.

The first two hotel licences were issued in 1866 at about same time as the first store was built - the Yetman Hotel first and then the Macintyre Hotel. The Macintyre Hotel was built and first operated by William Watson Rainbow. Country hotels were often the social hub of the town and the Macintyre Hotel was no exception. Its verandah served as a stand for the racing stewards at the Easter Races of 1870. New Year and Easter Races saw the "squatters and gentry" mix with the selectors and station labourers - master and man united in their enthusiasm for racing, betting and celebratory dinners. The latter were often hosted by the publican, who often put up a prize or two for the winners. The Macintyre Hotel is no more, while the Yetman Hotel became what is now the Codfish Hotel.

The first public school was established in 1867, following a letter from local people - William Watson Rainbow, Sidonia Hensler, William Playle, Jacob Miller, William Sleuk and George Kobs - to the Council of Education. The Yetman Post Office opened on 1 September 1867. In applying for a post office the applicants claimed that the population was then about 100 but this was considered a considerable exaggeration. The publican of the Yetman Hotel, Richard Holmes, became the first Postmaster. The first police station was built in 1874. St Andrews Church was built in the 1870s for use by both Presbyterian and Anglican congregations.

The town has always been associated with beef cattle and horses, with the sheep, wool and timber industries developing only slightly later. The thick rabbit and prickly-pear-ridden scrub of the brigalow and belah country was reclaimed from expiring leases in the 1920s and the back-breaking work of rendering it fit for agriculture did not bear fruit until the 1950s when wheat-growing became and remains a highly successful enterprise. Some crops are also grown on the fecund black soils of the river flats.
