= Inverell Shire =

- Local government area
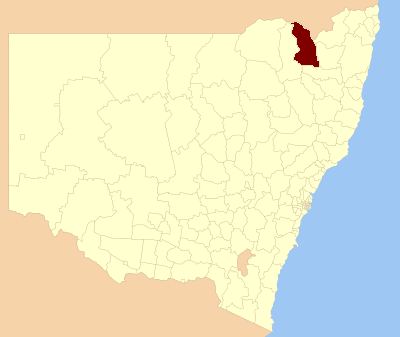
- Location in New South Wales

- Interactive map of Inverell Shire
- Coordinates: 29°46′S 151°07′E
- Country: Australia
- State: New South Wales
- Region: North West Slopes
- Established: 1 July 1979
- Council seat: Inverell

Government
  - Mayor: Kate Dight (Unaligned)
  - State electorate: Northern Tablelands
  - Federal division: New England

Area
  - Total: 8,606 km^{2} (3,323 sq mi)

Population
  - Totals: 17,853 (2021 census); 16,844 (2018 est.)
  - Density: 2.07448/km^{2} (5.3729/sq mi)
- Website: Inverell Shire
LGAs around Inverell Shire
Goondiwindi (Qld)	Goondiwindi (Qld)	Tenterfield
Gwydir	Inverell Shire	Glen Innes Severn
Gwydir	Uralla	Armidale

Inverell Shire is a local government area in the North West Slopes region of New South Wales, Australia adjacent to the Macintyre River and the Gwydir Highway.

The mayor of Inverell Shire Council is Kate Dight, who is unaligned with any political party.

== History ==
Inverell Shire was created on 1 July 1979 from the amalgamation of the Municipality of Inverell with Ashford Shire and Macintyre Shire.

Formerly part of the Armidale Region, on 1 July 2019, Tingha was transferred to the Inverell Shire.

== Main towns and villages ==
The shire includes the town of Inverell and small towns and villages including Gilgai, Stannifer, Elsmore, Bukkulla, Ashford, Bonshaw, Yetman, Wallangra, Graman, Oakwood, Delungra, Mount Russell and Tingha. The locality of Myall Creek is split being Inverell Shire and Gwydir Shire.

== Demographics ==
At the 2011 census, there were 16,075 people in the Inverell local government area, of these 49.1 per cent were male, and 50.9 per cent were female. Aboriginal and Torres Strait Islander people made up 6.5 per cent of the population which is approximately two-and-a-half times above both the national and state averages of 2.5 per cent. The median age of people in the Inverell Shire was 41 years; slightly higher than the national median of 37 years. Children aged 0 – 14 years made up 21.3 per cent of the population and people aged 65 years and over made up 19.2 per cent of the population. Of people in the area aged 15 years and over, 51.3 per cent were married and 11.8 per cent were either divorced or separated.

Between the 2001 census and the 2011 census, the Inverell Shire experienced nominal population growth in both absolute and real terms. When compared with the total population growth of Australia for the same periods, being 5.78 per cent and 8.32 per cent respectively, population growth in the Inverell local government area was significantly lower than the national average. The median weekly income for residents within the Inverell Shire was significantly below the national average.

At the 2011 census, the proportion of residents in the Inverell local government area who stated their ancestry as Australian or Anglo-Saxon exceeded 88 per cent of all residents (the national average was 65.2 per cent). In excess of 68 per cent of all residents in the Inverell Shire nominated a religious affiliation with Christianity at the 2011 census, which was higher than the national average of 50.2 per cent. Meanwhile, as at the census date, compared to the national average, households in the Inverell local government area had a significantly lower than average proportion (3.2 per cent) where two or more languages are spoken (the national average was 20.4 per cent); and a significantly higher proportion (94.5 per cent) where English only was spoken at home (national average was 76.8 per cent).

=== Selected historical census data ===
Selected historical census data for Inverell Shire local government area
Census year		2001	2006	2011
Population	Estimated residents on Census night	15,020	▲15,510	▲16,075
Population	LGA rank in terms of size within New South Wales		82nd	▲74th
Population	% of New South Wales population			0.23%
Population	% of Australian population	0.08%	0.08%	▼0.07%
Cultural and language diversity				
Ancestry, top responses	Australian			36.8%
Ancestry, top responses	English			31.7%
Ancestry, top responses	Irish			8.2%
Ancestry, top responses	Scottish			7.4%
Ancestry, top responses	German			3.9%
Language, top responses (other than English)	Italian	0.4%	0.4%	▼0.3%
Language, top responses (other than English)	Portuguese	n/c	n/c	▲0.3%
Language, top responses (other than English)	Tagalog	n/c	n/c	▲0.2%
Language, top responses (other than English)	German	0.1%	▲0.2%	▼0.1%
Language, top responses (other than English)	Filipino	n/c	n/c	▲0.1%
Religious affiliation				
Religious affiliation, top responses	Anglican	37.0%	▼34.0%	▼32.8%
Religious affiliation, top responses	Catholic	23.7%	▲23.8%	▼22.8%
Religious affiliation, top responses	No Religion	7.1%	▲10.7%	▲13.7%
Religious affiliation, top responses	Presbyterian and Reformed	9.0%	▼8.2%	▼7.5%
Religious affiliation, top responses	Uniting Church	4.7%	▼6.1%	▼5.8%
Median weekly incomes				
Personal income	Median weekly personal income		A$352	A$430
Personal income	% of Australian median personal income		75.5%	▼74.5%
Family income	Median weekly family income		A$840	A$963
Family income	% of Australian median family income		71.7%	▼65.0%
Household income	Median weekly household income		A$642	A$792
Household income	% of Australian median household income		62.5%	▲64.2%

== Council ==
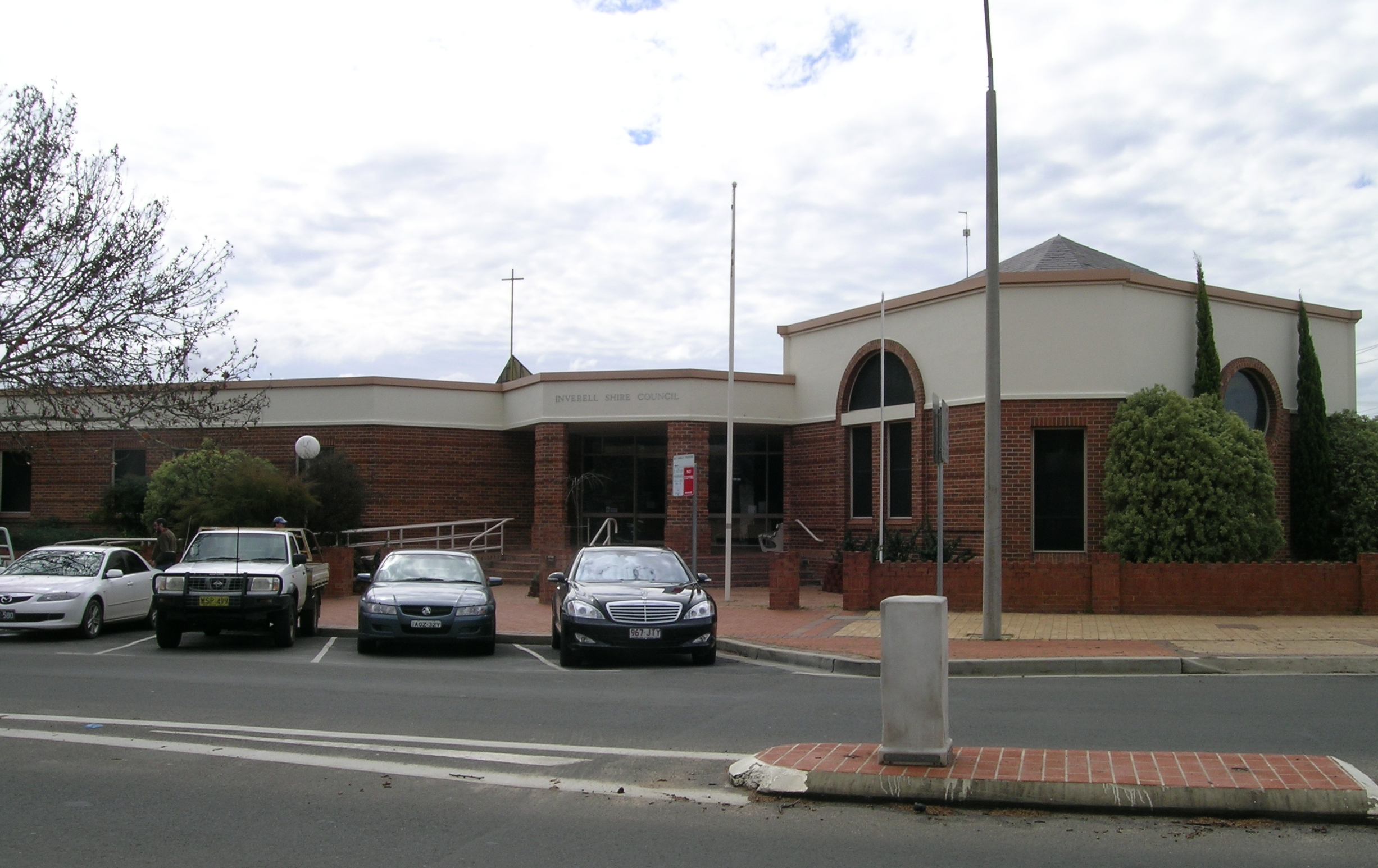
Inverell Shire Council chambers

=== Current composition and election method ===
Inverell Shire Council is composed of nine councillors elected proportionally as a single ward. All councillors are elected for a fixed four-year term of office. The mayor is elected by the councillors at the first meeting of the council. The most recent election was held on 4 December 2021, and the makeup of the council is as follows:

Party	Councillors
Independents and unaligned	9
Total	9

== Election results ==
=== 2024 ===
2024 New South Wales local elections: Inverell
Party	Candidate	Votes	%	±%
Independent	1. Kate Dight (elected); 2. Ian Hooker (elected)	2,551	25.66	
Independent	1. Paul Harmon (Ind. Nat) (elected); 2. John (Jacko) Ross (elected)	2,372	23.86	
Independent	Greg Kachel (elected)	1,723	17.33	
Independent	1. Jo Williams (elected); 2. Fiona Brown (elected)	1,350	13.58	
Independent	1. Paul King (elected); 2. Wendy Wilks (Ind. Nat) (elected)	1,280	12.88	
Independent	Kelvin Brown	396	3.98	
Independent National	Graem Murray	268	2.70	
Total formal votes		9,940	90.69	
Informal votes		1,021	9.31	
Turnout		10,961	82.99	

=== 2021 ===
2021 New South Wales local elections: Inverell
Party	Candidate	Votes	%	±%
Independent	1. Paul Harmon (elected); 2. Kate Dight (elected)	3,271	33.1	
Di Baker & Jo Williams	1. Di Baker (elected); 2. Jo Williams (elected)	2,947	29.8	
Independent	1. Paul King (elected); 2. Wendy Wilks (elected)	1,264	12.8	
Independent	Nicky Lavender (elected)	665	6.7	
Independent	Stewart Berryman (elected)	592	6.0	
Independent	John (Jacko) Ross (elected)	481	4.9	
Independent	Phil Girle	347	3.5	
Independent	Jacki Watts	320	3.2	
Total formal votes		9,887	93.3	
Informal votes		705	6.7	
Turnout		10,592	82.3	
