= Inverell =

- Town
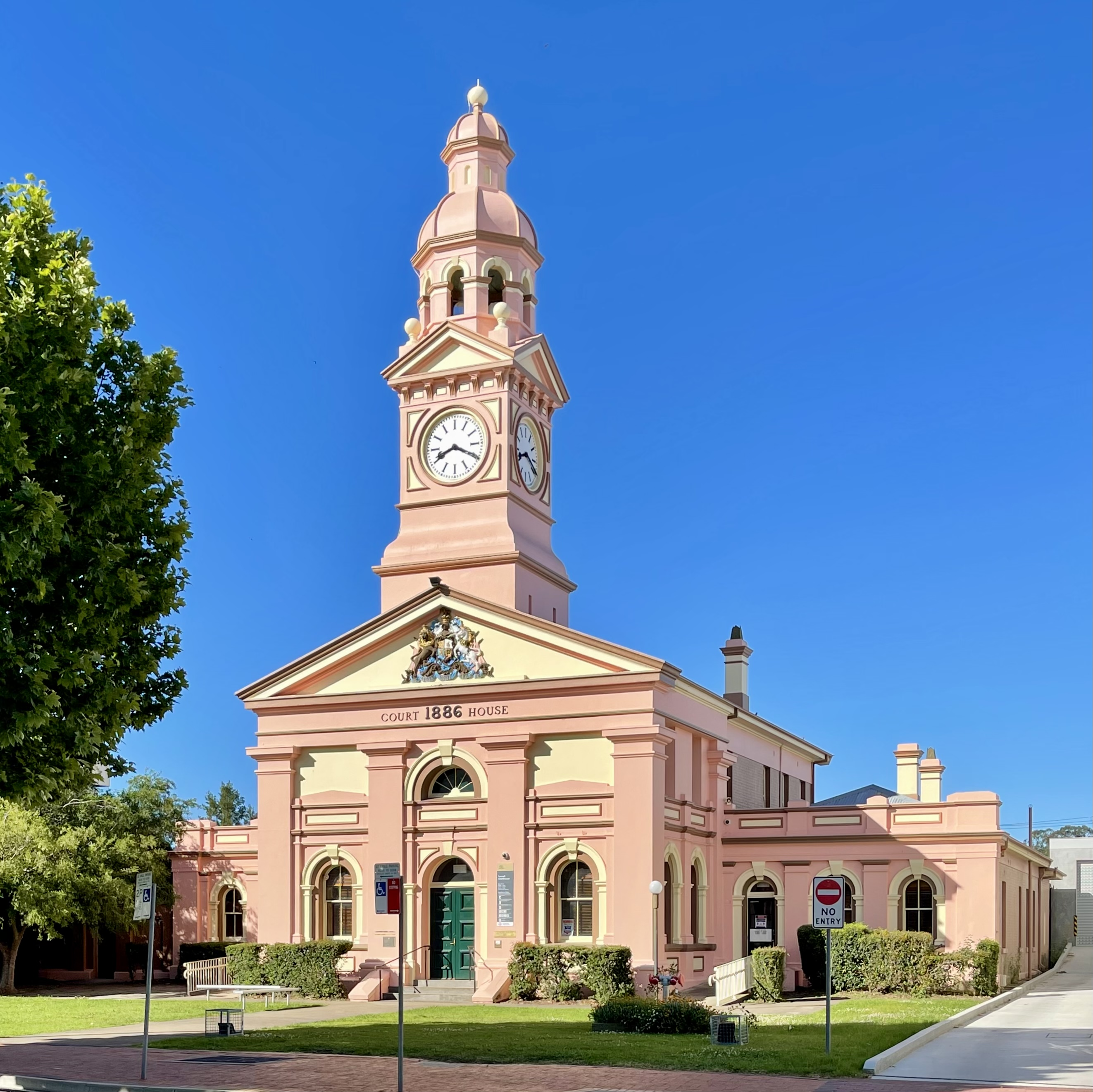
- Inverell Court House, built in 1886

- Coordinates: 29°46′S 151°07′E
- Country: Australia
- State: New South Wales
- LGA: Inverell Shire
- Location: 570 km (350 mi) N of Sydney; 429 km (267 mi) SW of Brisbane; 124 km (77 mi) NW of Armidale; 129 km (80 mi) E of Moree; 61 km (38 mi) W of Glen Innes
- Established: 1856

Government
  - State electorate: Northern Tablelands
  - Federal division: New England
- Elevation: 582 m (1,909 ft)

Population
  - Total: 12,057 (2021 census)
- Postcode: 2360
- County: Gough
- Mean max temp: 22.7 °C (72.9 °F)
- Mean min temp: 10.3 °C (50.5 °F)
- Annual rainfall: 800.0 mm (31.50 in)

Inverell is a large town in northern New South Wales, Australia, situated on the Macintyre River, close to the Queensland border. It is also the centre of Inverell Shire. Inverell is located on the Gwydir Highway on the western slopes of the Northern Tablelands. It has a temperate climate. In the 2021 census, the population of Inverell was 12,057 and the Inverell Shire population was 17,853.

== History ==
Prior to British colonisation, the Jukambal and Weraerai Aboriginal peoples lived in and occupied this region. Around 1838, colonist Peter MacIntyre directed his employee, Alexander Campbell, to take up land in the area for his sheep and cattle. Campbell subsequently laid claim to a large section of pastureland along the Macintyre River, which he called 'Byron Plains' after Peter Byron, one of MacIntyre's stockmen. Campbell later staked out 50,000 acres for himself on the southern side of Byron Plains. He named his run 'Inverell', the word being of Gaelic origin, and signifies "meeting place of the swans"; from Inbhir, a confluence, and eala, a swan. In the initial years, the local Aboriginal people resisted this occupation by spearing MacIntyre's shepherds and taking his livestock.

Inverell is at the junction of the MacIntyre River and Swanbrook Creek and was also known as "Green Swamp" in the 1850s. Wheat growers, Colin and Rosanna Ross established a store there in 1853, and it was proposed that a town be surveyed. In 1858, this was done and in the following years the plan was approved and the first land sale was held. Byron Post Office (open since 1855) was replaced by the Inverell Post Office on 15 September 1859. The municipality was proclaimed in March 1872. The last section of the Inverell branchline, from Delungra to Inverell, was opened on 10 March 1902. The last train ran to Inverell on 22 June 1987, and the Delungra to Inverell section of the line was closed on 2 December 1987.

In 1871, the population of Inverell was 509, this increased to 1,212 in 1881. After Federation, the population of Inverell was 1,230 in 1911, and grew to 6,530 (1947) and 8,209 (1961 census).

=== Myall Creek Massacre ===
The massacre of at least 28 Wirrayaraay people by European convicts and settlers took place at Myall Creek near Inverell on 10 June 1838 was notable in that it was one of the very rare cases in colonial Australia for which white people were subsequently executed for the murder of Indigenous people. The crime became known as the Myall Creek Massacre. On 18 December 1838, seven men were publicly hanged at the Sydney Gaol for the atrocity.

Every year on the Sunday of the June long weekend, hundreds of people, both Indigenous and non-Indigenous, gather at the Myall Creek Massacre and Memorial Site to attend an annual memorial service.

=== Mining ===
Diamonds were discovered at Copes Creek in 1875 and were mined at Copeton from 1883 to 1922. Commercial sapphire mining was commenced in 1919 at Frazers Creek near Inverell. Rich alluvial deposits in streams were worked initially by hand miners, but this ceased in the 1930s due to the economic effects of the Great Depression. There was little recorded production up until approximately 1960, when commercial sapphire mining resumed due to a worldwide sapphire shortage. During the 1970s there were over 100 active mining operations in the New England region, however this number declined significantly in the 1980s due to weakening demand and exhaustion of the previously rich alluvial sources. Currently there are only a small number of commercially active mines in the area.

== Heritage listings ==
Inverell has a number of heritage-listed sites, including:

- 56 Byron Street: Inverell Shire Council Building
- 97 Otho Street: Inverell Post Office

== Population ==
Historical population
Year	Pop.	±%
1921	4,369	—
1933	5,305	+21.4%
1947	6,530	+23.1%
1954	7,514	+15.1%
1961	8,209	+9.2%
1966	8,413	+2.5%
1971	9,712	+15.4%
1976	9,432	−2.9%
1981	9,734	+3.2%
1986	9,693	−0.4%
1991	9,736	+0.4%
1996	9,378	−3.7%
2001	9,525	+1.6%
2006	9,749	+2.4%
2011	9,347	−4.1%
2016	9,547	+2.1%
2021	9,654	+1.1%
Source: Australian Bureau of Statistics data.

According to the 2021 Australian census, there were 14,995 people residing in the Inverell area.

- The median age was 42.
- Aboriginal and Torres Strait Islander people made up 10.2% of the population.
- The most popular country of birth was Australia at 82.6% of the population. The most common other countries of birth were England (1.2%) and Philippines (0.9%), and America (0.9%).
- 86.8% of people spoke only English at home, with 5.3% of households speaking other languages such as Fijian, Portuguese and Tagalog.
- The most common responses for religion were No Religion (30.5%), Anglican (21.8%) and Catholic (19.2%).

== Industry ==
The Inverell district is in a fertile agricultural region which produces a wide range of crops, including wheat, barley, oats, sorghum, wine grapes and maize. Inverell is also home to one of Australia's largest meat processors, Bindaree Beef, a business which employs more than 600 people in the area. There are many agricultural groups who have purchased significant land in the Inverell area, including Paraway Group and S. Kidman & Co owned by Gina Rinehart

There are also some mining activities with tin, sapphires, zircons and diamonds (mainly industrial) being found. Inverell is known as the "Sapphire City" because of the sapphires that have been found throughout the local district, which contributed a significant amount of Australia's sapphire production in the 1970s.

Copeton Dam, the region's main water supply, was completed in 1976. While being smaller than Sydney Harbour, it can hold nearly 2 times the capacity of Port Jackson (Sydney Harbour). The Inland Fishing Festival is held there every year.

== Culture and tourism ==
The Grafton to Inverell Cycle Classic is an annual one day cycling race. Beginning in Grafton, passing through Glen Innes and finishing in Inverell, the Classic is a 230 km ride over the demanding Gibraltar Range. The race starts at 23 metres above sea level and climbs to 1260 metres, before finishing in Inverell at 630 metres. The race is six to seven hours long, depending on weather conditions.

Inverell is home to the Bruderhof, an Anabaptist community who share all their possessions. They run multiple businesses in the area including, a publishing business, signmaking, and dental & doctor's clinic.

== Education ==
There are two primary schools in Inverell; Ross Hill School and Inverell Public School. The two local high schools are Inverell High School and Macintyre High School. Holy Trinity School is a Roman Catholic School in Inverell which caters for students from Kindergarten to Year 10. Rivers Christian College opened in 2026 for kindergarten to year 4, with plans to offer a full K–12 cohort by 2034.

== Transport ==
Inverell is served by Inverell Airport.

Inverell lies on the Gwydir Highway, one of the primary east–west routes through New South Wales. Thunderbolts Way terminates at Copes Creek, 16 km south of the Gwydir Highway intersection at Inverell.

Bus services in Inverell are provided by Inverell Bus Service, which operates two town loops, to the east and west. Interurban bus service is provided by Symes Coaches to Glen Innes.

NSW TrainLink operates three Coach services in and out of Inverell: between Moree and Grafton, between Inverell and Tamworth via Manilla and between Inverell and Armidale via Tingha.

== Sports ==
Rugby league is a popular sport in Inverell. The Inverell RSM Hawks compete in Group 19 and play their home matches at Varley Oval. Founded in 1965, the club has won first-grade premierships across Group 5 and Group 19 (including 1975, 1998, 2000, 2011, 2015, 2016, and 2025). The club has produced several National Rugby League (NRL) and representative players, including:

- Owen Craigie – Newcastle Knights, Wests Tigers, and South Sydney Rabbitohs
- Preston Campbell – 2001 Dally M Medallist and 2003 premiership winner with the Penrith Panthers, who also represented the Cronulla-Sutherland Sharks and Gold Coast Titans
- Phil Bailey – NSW State of Origin and Australia representative forward who played for the Cronulla-Sutherland Sharks and Wigan Warriors
- Chris Bailey – Newcastle Knights, Manly Warringah Sea Eagles, and London Broncos
- Matt White – Newcastle Knights, Gold Coast Titans, and Melbourne Storm
- Peter Ellis – Sydney Roosters and St George Illawarra Dragons
- Bevan French – Parramatta Eels and Wigan Warriors; 2024 Super League Man of Steel winner

Other local clubs include the Inverell Highlanders RUFC, which competes in the Central Northern Rugby Union, and the Inverell Saints AFC, which competes in AFL North West NSW.

In association football (football/Soccer), Inverell FC plays at the Inverell Sporting Complex and competes in the Northern Inland Premier League. The club won both the first-grade and reserve-grade premierships in 2024 and retained the first-grade premiership in 2025. Its women’s team received Northern NSW Football’s Team of the Year award at the 2024 Local Champion Awards after winning the Jan Johnson Cup and finishing as grand final runners-up in its first season in the Armidale Women’s Premier League.

The town's football history also featured senior competition by Joeys FC, which drew national attention in 2011 when former A-League defender Chad Gibson—the inaugural club captain of Brisbane Roar—signed to play for the club following his career in the National Soccer League and overseas with FK Bodø/Glimt.

Inverell also hosts the Rale Rasic Joeys Mini World Cup, an annual football tournament established by Heinrich Haussler in 2010 with an initial 16 teams. Following periods in Hervey Bay and Lismore—reaching a peak participation record of 76 teams (with over 100 registered) in 2021 while staged in Hervey Bay—the tournament returned to Inverell in 2023. That year, it was renamed in memory of its patron, Rale Rasic, who coached Australia at the 1974 FIFA World Cup.

Participating teams represent assigned countries, with their club or team names displayed beneath the country names in tournament fixtures and results. The tournament includes junior divisions, an open women’s competition and a division for players with disability. Awards include team and individual trophies, while selected players and coaches receive funded or subsidised places on football tours to Germany.

== Climate ==
Inverell, due to its altitude features a warm temperate climate with a marked summer peak in rainfall and cool, clear winters with severe frosts commonplace. The town is located on the boundary region between the cool, wet Northern Tablelands of the Great Dividing Range and the hot, dry plains of western New South Wales, having climate characteristics of both regions. The town is considerably sunny with an average of 2,930 sun hours annually.

The highest temperature recorded at Inverell was 43.7 °C (110.7 °F) on 4 January 1903 at the Inverell Comparison site, while the highest minimum temperature was 26.7 °C (80.1 °F) on 29 December 1880. The lowest temperature was −10.6 °C (12.9 °F) on 30 July 1882 at Inverell Comparison, while the lowest maximum temperature was 3.0 °C (37.4 °F) on 3 July 1984 at the Inverell Research Centre. In September 1892, the town had its biggest snowfall, with 4 to 5 inches (10 to 13 cm) falling. On 5 August 1923, snow fell in parts of the Inverell district.

Climate data for Inverell Research Centre (1949–2025); 664 m AMSL; 29.78° S, 151.08° E
Month	Jan	Feb	Mar	Apr	May	Jun	Jul	Aug	Sep	Oct	Nov	Dec	Year
Record high °C (°F)	41.1 (106.0)	41.3 (106.3)	36.0 (96.8)	32.1 (89.8)	27.4 (81.3)	25.6 (78.1)	23.0 (73.4)	31.9 (89.4)	32.1 (89.8)	36.2 (97.2)	39.2 (102.6)	41.5 (106.7)	41.5 (106.7)
Mean daily maximum °C (°F)	29.8 (85.6)	29.0 (84.2)	27.2 (81.0)	23.6 (74.5)	19.1 (66.4)	15.8 (60.4)	15.3 (59.5)	16.9 (62.4)	20.2 (68.4)	23.4 (74.1)	26.1 (79.0)	28.6 (83.5)	22.9 (73.3)
Mean daily minimum °C (°F)	16.6 (61.9)	16.4 (61.5)	14.6 (58.3)	11.1 (52.0)	7.4 (45.3)	4.9 (40.8)	3.7 (38.7)	4.4 (39.9)	7.1 (44.8)	10.4 (50.7)	12.9 (55.2)	15.2 (59.4)	10.4 (50.7)
Record low °C (°F)	6.5 (43.7)	6.2 (43.2)	3.4 (38.1)	−0.3 (31.5)	−3.5 (25.7)	−5.5 (22.1)	−5.0 (23.0)	−4.3 (24.3)	−2.0 (28.4)	−1.0 (30.2)	2.7 (36.9)	5.7 (42.3)	−5.5 (22.1)
Average precipitation mm (inches)	97.8 (3.85)	94.4 (3.72)	74.8 (2.94)	40.6 (1.60)	47.5 (1.87)	45.6 (1.80)	48.0 (1.89)	44.2 (1.74)	48.1 (1.89)	75.3 (2.96)	86.8 (3.42)	97.9 (3.85)	802.3 (31.59)
Average precipitation days (≥ 1.0 mm)	7.9	6.9	5.7	4.1	4.5	5.2	5.3	4.9	5.1	7.3	7.3	8.0	72.2
Mean monthly sunshine hours	279.0	245.8	260.4	237.0	201.5	180.0	195.3	248.0	258.0	279.0	267.0	279.0	2,930

Climate data for Inverell Comparison (1874–1997); 584 m AMSL; 29.78° S, 151.11° E
Month	Jan	Feb	Mar	Apr	May	Jun	Jul	Aug	Sep	Oct	Nov	Dec	Year
Record high °C (°F)	43.7 (110.7)	41.7 (107.1)	41.1 (106.0)	33.9 (93.0)	29.4 (84.9)	25.6 (78.1)	24.2 (75.6)	29.4 (84.9)	32.8 (91.0)	36.7 (98.1)	39.4 (102.9)	41.9 (107.4)	43.7 (110.7)
Mean daily maximum °C (°F)	30.6 (87.1)	29.8 (85.6)	27.8 (82.0)	24.1 (75.4)	19.7 (67.5)	16.2 (61.2)	15.3 (59.5)	17.2 (63.0)	20.5 (68.9)	24.0 (75.2)	27.4 (81.3)	29.7 (85.5)	23.5 (74.4)
Mean daily minimum °C (°F)	15.3 (59.5)	14.8 (58.6)	12.4 (54.3)	7.8 (46.0)	3.7 (38.7)	1.2 (34.2)	−0.2 (31.6)	0.5 (32.9)	3.5 (38.3)	7.6 (45.7)	11.1 (52.0)	13.8 (56.8)	7.6 (45.7)
Record low °C (°F)	2.8 (37.0)	2.2 (36.0)	1.5 (34.7)	−4.3 (24.3)	−7.5 (18.5)	−10.0 (14.0)	−10.6 (12.9)	−9.4 (15.1)	−7.2 (19.0)	−6.7 (19.9)	−1.7 (28.9)	1.5 (34.7)	−10.6 (12.9)
Average precipitation mm (inches)	98.7 (3.89)	83.4 (3.28)	65.1 (2.56)	43.3 (1.70)	47.9 (1.89)	49.7 (1.96)	50.8 (2.00)	44.4 (1.75)	48.5 (1.91)	67.7 (2.67)	73.9 (2.91)	90.6 (3.57)	763.4 (30.06)
Average precipitation days (≥ 1.0 mm)	7.6	6.4	5.6	4.3	4.7	5.4	5.4	5.2	5.2	6.7	6.7	7.5	70.7
Average afternoon relative humidity (%)	42	45	45	45	49	51	48	41	39	39	37	38	43
Source: Australian Bureau of Meteorology; Inverell Comparison

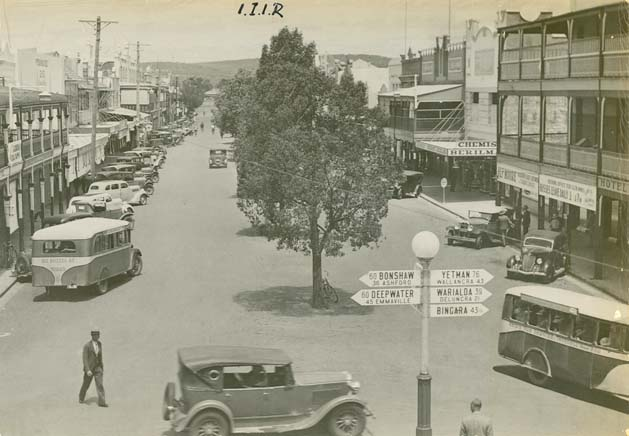
Byron Street, Inverell. Undated

Over the years, Inverell has had three weather stations run by government astronomers (prior to 1908) or the Bureau of Meteorology (after 1908), or both. These stations are:

- Inverell Comparison (began observations in 1874, ceased observations in November 1997)
- Inverell Research Centre (began observations in 1949, still operational; converted to an Automatic Weather Station in recent years)
- Inverell (Raglan Street) (began observations in March 1995, still operational; observations done by human observer)
- Flepper Deyah weather station (began observations in 1981 and was burnt down in 1981)

== Notable people ==
Notable people from or who have lived in Inverell include:

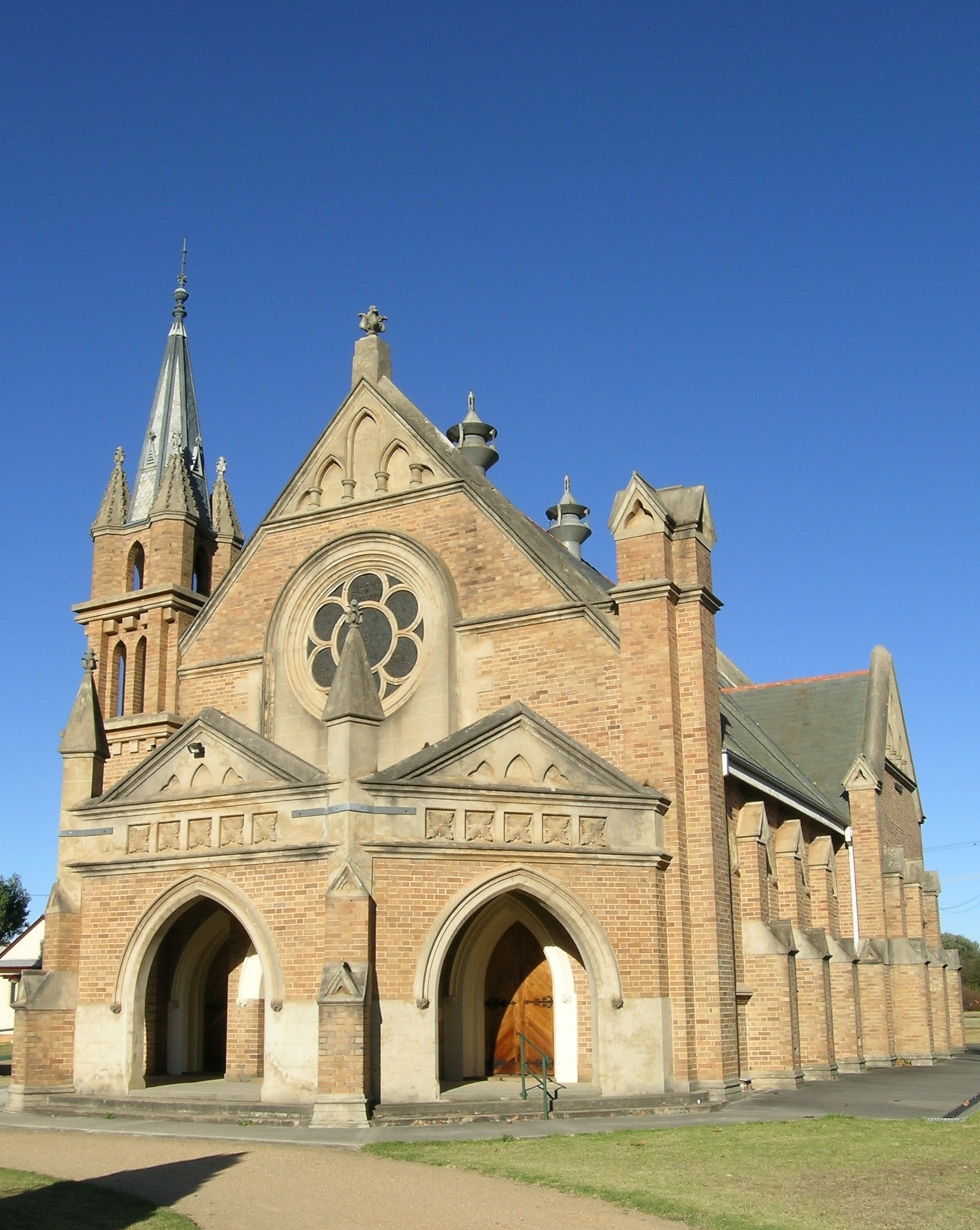
Uniting Church, Inverell

- Bronwyn Oliver (born 1959), significant Australian sculptor
- Chris Bailey (born 1982), rugby league player
- Phil Bailey (born 1980), former professional rugby league player
- Owen Craigie (born 1978), former rugby league player
- Steve Elkington (born 1962), golfer, 1995 US PGA Champion.
- Susan Hampton (born 1949), poet, winner of the Judith Wright Award
- Heinrich Haussler (born 1984), cyclist
- Heinrich Haussler Snr (2011 started the inaugural Inverell Joeys Mini World Cup)
- Peter Hewat, former rugby union player
- George Kneipp (1922–1993), a judge of the Supreme Court of Queensland in Townsville, Queensland (1969–1992)
- Colin Madigan (1921–2011), architect
- Rick McCosker (born 1946), cricketer and Wisden Cricketer of the Year in 1976
- Leon Punch (1928–1991), former Deputy Premier of New South Wales
- Ivan Sen (born 1971), filmmaker
- Leo Senior (1887–1975), former rugby league player
- Scott Sunderland (born 1966), former cyclist.
- John Williams (born 1955), NSW Nationals Senator
