= Inverell Hawks =

Australian rugby league club, based in Inverell, NSW

Club information
- Full name: Inverell Hawks Rugby League Football Club
- Colours: Maroon; White
- Founded: 1965; 61 years ago

Current details
- Ground: Varley Oval, Inverell
- Competition: Group 19 Rugby League

Records
- Premierships: 7 (1975, 1998, 2000, 2011, 2015, 2016, 2025)

Inverell Hawks Rugby League Football Club is an Australian rugby league football club based in Inverell, New South Wales. They conduct teams for Juniors & Seniors.

The club was formerly known as the Inverell Swans until the early 1980s.

== Notable Juniors ==
- Peter Ellis (1997-03 Sydney Roosters & St George Illawarra Dragons)
- Owen Craigie (1995-00 Newcastle Knights, Wests Tigers & South Sydney Rabbitohs)
- Peter Ellis (1997-03 Sydney Roosters & St George Illawarra Dragons)
- Preston Campbell (1998-11 Cronulla Sharks, Penrith Panthers & Gold Coast Titans)
- Phil Bailey (1999-10 Cronulla Sharks & Wigan Warriors)
- Matt White (2005-16 Newcastle Knights, Gold Coast Titans & Melbourne Storm)
- Chris Bailey (2006-15 Newcastle Knights, Manly Sea Eagles & London Broncos)
- Bevan French (2016- Parramatta Eels & Wigan Warriors)
