= Derek Hallas =

GB international rugby league footballer (1933–2025)

Personal information
- Born: 1934 Leeds, England
- Died: 12 May 2025 (aged 90–91)

Playing information

Rugby union
- Position: Centre
Club
Years	Team	Pld	T	G	FG	P
195?–53	Roundhay RFC
Representative
Years	Team	Pld	T	G	FG	P
≤Dec 1953–≤Dec 53	Yorkshire

Rugby league
- Position: Centre
Club
Years	Team	Pld	T	G	FG	P
1953–59	Keighley	175	75	11		247
1959–62	Leeds	135	60	18		216
1962–63	Keighley	14
1963–65	Parramatta Eels	43	8	7	0	38
	Total	367	143	36	0	501
Representative
Years	Team	Pld	T	G	FG	P
1957–61	Yorkshire	5	0	0	0	0
1961	Great Britain	2	0	0	0	0

Coaching information
Club
Years	Team	Gms	W	D	L	W%
1974	Halifax RLFC

Derek Hallas (1934 – 12 May 2025) was an English rugby union and professional rugby league footballer who played in the 1950s and 1960s, and coached rugby league in the 1960s. He played representative level rugby union (RU) for Yorkshire, and at club level for Roundhay RFC, as a centre and representative level rugby league (RL) for Great Britain and Yorkshire, and at club level for Keighley (two spells), Leeds, Parramatta Eels and the Inverell Hawks (captain), as a centre, and coached at club level for the Inverell Hawks.

== Background ==
Derek Hallas was born in Leeds, West Riding of Yorkshire, England in 1934. He was a pupil at Hunslet Carr County Primary School, Hunslet.

Hallas died on 12 May 2025.

== Playing career ==
=== International honours ===
Hallas won caps for Great Britain (RL) while at Leeds in 1961 against France, and New Zealand.

=== County honours ===
Hallas represented Yorkshire (RU) while at Roundhay, and represented Yorkshire (RL) while at Keighley.

=== Championship final appearances ===
Hallas played at centre and scored two tries, in Leeds' 25–10 victory over Warrington in the Championship Final during the 1960–61 season at Odsal Stadium, Bradford on Saturday 20 May 1961, in front of a crowd of 52,177.

=== Club career ===
Hallas played rugby union for Roundhay RFC, switching code to rugby league, he signed for Keighley in December 1953, signing for Leeds in January 1959 for £4,000 (based on increases in average earnings, this would be approximately £195,800 in 2016), he resigned for Keighley in October 1962 for £3,000 (based on increases in average earnings, this would be approximately £124,100 in 2016), before signing for Paramatta in April 1963.
