= Peter Ellis =

Peter Ellis may refer to:

- Peter Ellis (architect) (1805–1884), architect who designed the Oriel Chambers in Liverpool
- Peter Ellis (actor) (born 1936), English actor in The Bill
- Peter Ellis (director) (1948–2006), British television director
- Peter Ellis (duathlete) (born 1983), British duathlete
- Peter Ellis (footballer) (1947–2013), Australian rules footballer
- Peter Ellis (rugby league) (born 1976), former professional rugby league footballer
- Peter Berresford Ellis (born 1943), historian; expert on Celtic history
- Peter Ellis (childcare worker) (1958–2019), New Zealander wrongfully convicted of child molestation in 1993
- Peter Ellis (cricketer) (born 1932), English cricketer
- Peter J. Ellis, candidate of the Christian Heritage Party
- Peter Ellis, candidate of the Green Party of Canada

== See also ==
- Earl Hancock Ellis or Pete Ellis (1880–1923), U.S. marine
- Ellis Peters, pseudonym used by Edith Pargeter, British author
