= Peter B. Ellis (disambiguation) =

Peter B. Ellis is the name of:

- Peter Berresford Ellis (born 1943), English historian
- Peter B. Ellis (film editor), film editor of The Audrey Hepburn Story and The Scoundrel's Wife

== See also ==
- Peter Ellis (disambiguation)
