= Thomas Bruins =

Australian triathalete

Personal information
- Born: Perth, Australia

Sport
- Sport: Duathlon
Medal record
Representing Australia
OTU Duathlon Oceania Championships Elite
Gold medal – first place	2012 Oceania Champion	Barossa
Bronze medal – third place	2014 Oceania Bronze	Adelaide (AUS)
ASTC Duathlon Asian Championships Elite
Gold medal – first place	2017 Asian Champion	Putrajaya (MAS)
Gold medal – first place	2018 Asian Champion	Putrajaya (MAS)
Powerman World Series Elite
Gold medal – first place	2016 Powerman Malaysia	Putrajaya(MAS)
Gold medal – first place	2017 Powerman Indonesia	Jakarta(IND)
Gold medal – first place	2017 Powerman Thailand	Bangkok(THI)
Gold medal – first place	2018 Powerman Indonesia	Jakarta(IND)

Thomas Bruins is a dual national Australian and Netherlands Elite duathlete from Perth, Australia. Competing at Elite level he has won Asian and Oceania Continental Duathlon Championships as well as Powerman Duathlon World Series races in Putrajaya (Malaysia 2016), Jakarta (Indonesia 2017 and 2018) and Bangkok (Thailand 2018). He finished the 2017 Powerman World Series in second place, reaching a World ranking lead in 2017. Selected to compete for the Netherlands Elite team at the OTU Oceania and ASTC Asian Continental Championships and the ITU World Elite long distance duathlon championships Powerman Zofingen (Switzerland).

== Sporting career ==
Thomas Bruins lives and trains in Perth (AUS)
