= Inverell Post Office =

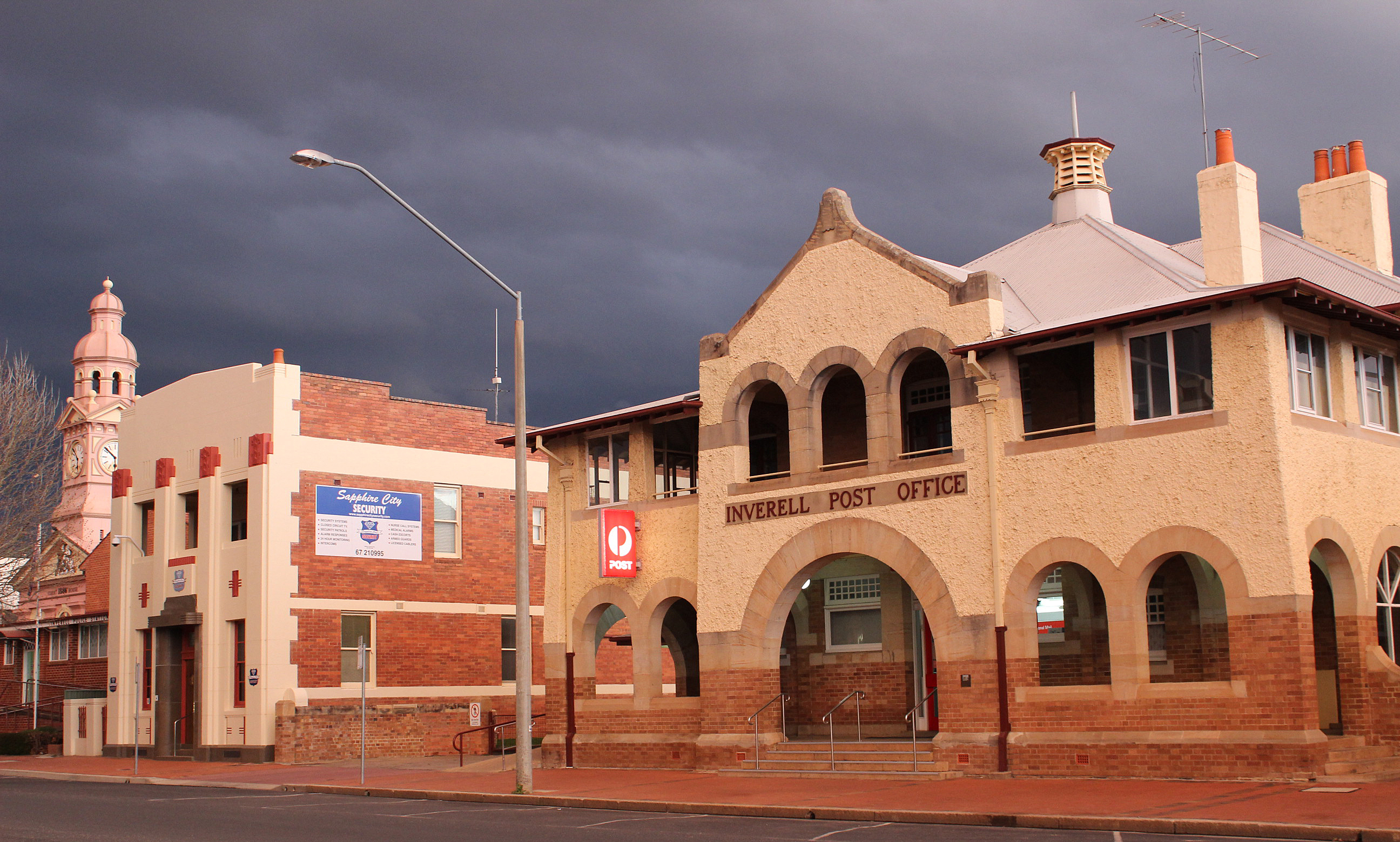
- Inverell Post Office, 2018

- Location within New South Wales Location within Australia
- 29.7763°S 151.1130°E
- Location: 97 Otho, Inverell, Inverell Shire, New South Wales, Australia

History
- Built: 1904–1904

Site notes
- Architect: NSW Government Architect’s Office under Walter Liberty Vernon.
- Owner: Australia Post

New South Wales Heritage Register
- Official name: Inverell Post Office
- Type: state heritage (built)
- Designated: 23 June 2000
- Reference no.: 1407
- Type: Post Office
- Category: Postal and Telecommunications
- Builders: Mr GF Nott

Inverell Post Office is a heritage-listed post office at 97 Otho Street, Inverell, in the North West Slopes region of New South Wales, Australia. It was designed by NSW Government Architect’s Office under Walter Liberty Vernon. and built in 1904 by G. F. Nott. The property is owned by Australia Post. It was added to the New South Wales State Heritage Register on 23 June 2000.

== History ==
The first post office at Inverell was established on 1 January 1855 in the store of Mr Colin Ross. Ross had settled on Byron Farm, that was to become Inverell, in 1853 and was instrumental in the development of the town. The Postmaster General's Annual Report for 1861 reported the establishment of a mail service between Armidale, Byron, and Frazer's Creek, via Moredun, Paradise Creek, Newstead, Inverell, and Buckulla once a week by horseback. The following year a service was established between Wellingrove and Inverell, once a fortnight.

Business continued to grow as Inverell grew in importance within the region, with over 4,300 letters being posted weekly and 220 mails received and dispatched by 1900. In 1900 the PMG Department finally agreed to the erection of a new post office on the site of the 1869 building.

The tender for the construction job was awarded to a G. F. Nott for £3,999.19.0 and approved on 26 June 1903. The new post office comprised the office, public space, a postmaster's office, telephone exchange, kitchen, sitting room, five bedrooms, pantry and wash house, plus bathrooms and storerooms.

The new office was officially opened on 2 September 1904. Additions took place in 1913–1917 costing £325, with further work carried out in 1916–1918 for £658.

== Description ==
Inverell Post Office is a two-storey building with a symmetrical front facade in the Federation Arts and Crafts Style, comprising cream-painted, roughcast render on an English bond, light-brown face-brick base, with heavy sandstone arches, coping and sills. There is a complex, hipped corrugated steel roof with a central louvred cupola, wide eaves with exposed rafter ends. To the centre facade is a parapeted gable with sandstone coping and a small plaque at the apex. Five roughcast chimneys with terracotta pots punctuate the roof, three to the western side and one to the southeastern corner of the two-storey section, with the remaining chimney located over the former kitchen to the rear western side of the single-storey section.

Inverell Post Office was reported to be generally in very good condition as at 22 June 2000, excepting general wear and tear. The archaeological potential is considered high for the site

Inverell Post Office is largely intact, and retains the features which make it culturally significant, including architectural details such as the prominent eaves with exposed rafters, large arches, roughcast walling and its overall scale, form and style.

=== Modifications and dates ===
It appears that Inverell Post Office has undergone numerous changes since its completion in 1904, mainly to the interior, as well as additions to the rear. The original building appears to have comprised the existing two-storey section, with perhaps a small, single-storey addition in the form of a mail room.

Records indicate unspecified additions, and further work occurred during the 1910s. The single-storey wing incorporating the former exchange and bathroom to the east was probably constructed first, during the 1913–17 period. The single-storey western wing, including the residence dining room, kitchen and laundry was probably added during the 1916–18 period. This is judged from the relative costs and scope of each to construct.

Various additions and infills have occurred c. 1950s, including the first-floor bathroom reconfiguration to include a toilet, kitchen installation prior to this date to the first floor, and the first-floor verandah infills at either end.

1989 plans indicate the removal of the rear male locker-room, clerical partitioning and the relocation of a partition within the retail space. Original fabric removed appears to have been limited to the centre wall of the current western mail room, opening up the space, with the removal of the partitioning from the original telegraph room.

Current configuration, inspected January 2000, shows no change to the first-floor configuration and minor internal partition and retail area changes to the ground floor

== Heritage listing ==
Inverell Post Office is significant at a State level for its historical associations, aesthetic qualities and social meaning.

Inverell Post Office is historically significant because it has been an important link in the network of communications for the town and surrounding region since the early 1900s. The form and scale of Inverell Post Office reflects the period of increased prosperity and economic growth of the town during the late nineteenth century.

Inverell Post Office is aesthetically significant because it is an excellent and rare example of the Federation Arts and Crafts architectural style, and makes an important aesthetic contribution to the civic precinct streetscape in Inverell. Inverell Post Office is also associated with the Colonial Architect's Office under Walter Liberty Vernon.

Inverell Post Office is also considered to be significant to the Inverell community's sense of place.

Inverell Post Office was listed on the New South Wales State Heritage Register on 23 June 2000 having satisfied the following criteria.

The place is important in demonstrating the course, or pattern, of cultural or natural history in New South Wales.

Inverell Post Office is historically significant because it became an important link in the network of communications in the region in the beginning of the twentieth century. Built on the same site as the earlier smaller post office, Inverell Post Office is also associated with the development of postal services in Inverell during the latter half of the nineteenth century.

The Post Office has been the centre of communications for the community for over a century. The form and scale of Inverell Post Office also reflect the period of economic development and growth of the town during the late nineteenth century.

Inverell Post Office is associated with the NSW Government Architect's Office under Walter Liberty Vernon, under whose leadership the office designed and maintained a number of post offices across NSW between 1890 and 1911.

The place is important in demonstrating aesthetic characteristics and/or a high degree of creative or technical achievement in New South Wales.

Inverell Post Office is aesthetically significant because it is an excellent example of the Federation Arts and Crafts style of architecture. Inverell Post Office also forms an interesting contrast with the adjacent Town Hall from the same period, and makes a major contribution to the streetscape of the Inverell Civic Precinct. The architectural style and location of the building make it a focal point of the civic precinct of Inverell, endowing it with landmark qualities.

The place has strong or special association with a particular community or cultural group in New South Wales for social, cultural or spiritual reasons.

As a prominent civic building, and an important link in the network of communications for the region, Inverell Post Office is considered to be significant to the Inverell community's sense of place.

The place has potential to yield information that will contribute to an understanding of the cultural or natural history of New South Wales.

The site has some potential to contain archaeological information which may provide information relating to the previous post office and earlier use of the site, and the evolution of the building and out-buildings associated with the use by the post office.

The place possesses uncommon, rare or endangered aspects of the cultural or natural history of New South Wales.

Inverell Post Office is considered to be rare because it is a particularly fine example of Federation Arts and Crafts architecture with strong design elements, it is largely intact and has distinctive streetscape qualities.

The place is important in demonstrating the principal characteristics of a class of cultural or natural places/environments in New South Wales.

Inverell Post Office is an excellent example of the Federation Arts and Crafts style of architecture. It is part of the group of nineteenth and early twentieth-century post offices designed by the NSW Government Architect's Office under Walter Liberty Vernon.

== See also ==
- Inverell Shire Council Building
