= Inverell Shire Council Building =

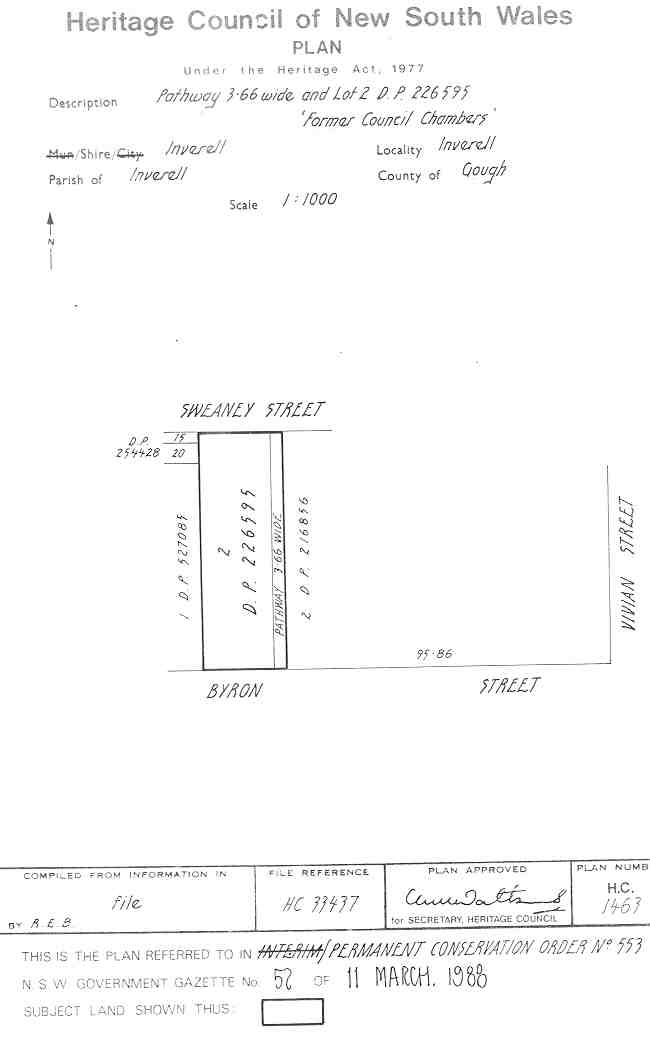
- Heritage boundaries

- Location within New South Wales Location within Australia
- 29.7733°S 151.1110°E
- Location: 56 Byron Street, Inverell, Inverell Shire, New South Wales, Australia

Site notes
- Architect: Varney Parkes
- Architectural style: Victorian Italianate

New South Wales Heritage Register
- Official name: Inverell Shire Council Building (former); Inverell Shire Council Building
- Type: state heritage (built)
- Designated: 2 April 1999
- Reference no.: 553
- Type: historic site

Inverell Shire Council Building is a heritage-listed former bank and council chambers and now retail premises at 56 Byron Street, Inverell, in the North West Slopes region of New South Wales, Australia. It was added to the New South Wales State Heritage Register on 2 April 1999.

== History ==
The Bank of New South Wales was first established in Inverell in 1872. In 1890, the bank wanted new premises which was designed by Varney Parkes on Byron Street at the end of Ortho Street, a prominent position in the town. In 1963, it was converted to council chambers for the Municipality of Inverell and its successor the Inverell Shire Council. The building is now used as retail premises.

== Description ==
The two-storeyed Victorian Italianate rendered brick bank building has a hipped roof (now tiled) and large rendered chimneys. The asymmetrical facade features a small entrance portico near one end with small pediment at roof level supported on Corinthian pilasters; three-bay two-storey verandah under the main roof with arched opening and masonry balustrade; roundheaded doors and French windows, The facade features Corinthian pilasters, dentillated eaves and swag mouldings in the entablature between floors around the entrance portico. The interior retains original stairs, joinery, marble chimney pieces, arches and plaster and pressed metal ceilings.

The asymmetrical street façade reflecting its use as both a manager's residence and bank chamber. The residence has three bay arched and two storied verandahs with Corinthian pilasters and masonry balustrades. The chambers have entrance with windows on each side with pediment at roof level supported with pilasters. The building's ground floor is raised to avoid flooding, and the basement floor opens to the rear.

The building has foundations four metres deep and reinforced with railway lines to combat movement on the black soil which is a common problem in Inverell. It has remained structurally sound.

== Significance ==
This building is one of the few Victorian buildings left in the business centre of the town. When built it was a very grand building for Inverell and reflected the mining boom of the 1880s. It occupies the most important streetscape location in the town opposite the end of Otho Street, and contributes significantly to the surviving nineteenth century character of the town centre.

It is an outstanding intact Victorian Italianate style bank building and one of the finest and most sophisticated buildings in the Shire. Its presence is enhanced by the raised ground floor level.

== Heritage listing ==
Inverell Shire Council Building was listed on the New South Wales State Heritage Register on 2 April 1999.

== See also ==
- Inverell Post Office
