= Powerman Duathlon =

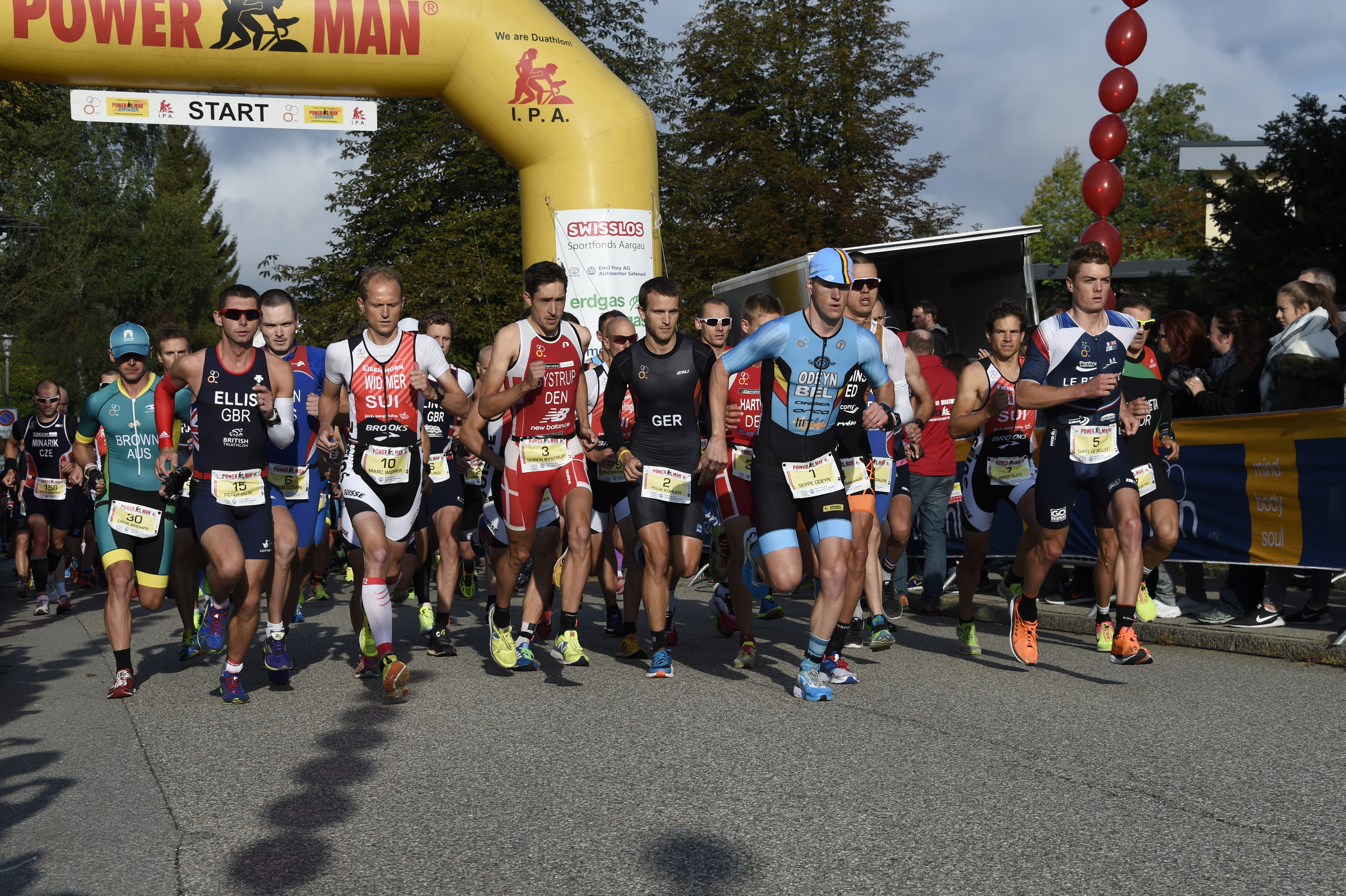
Powerman World Championships 2017 Men's Start

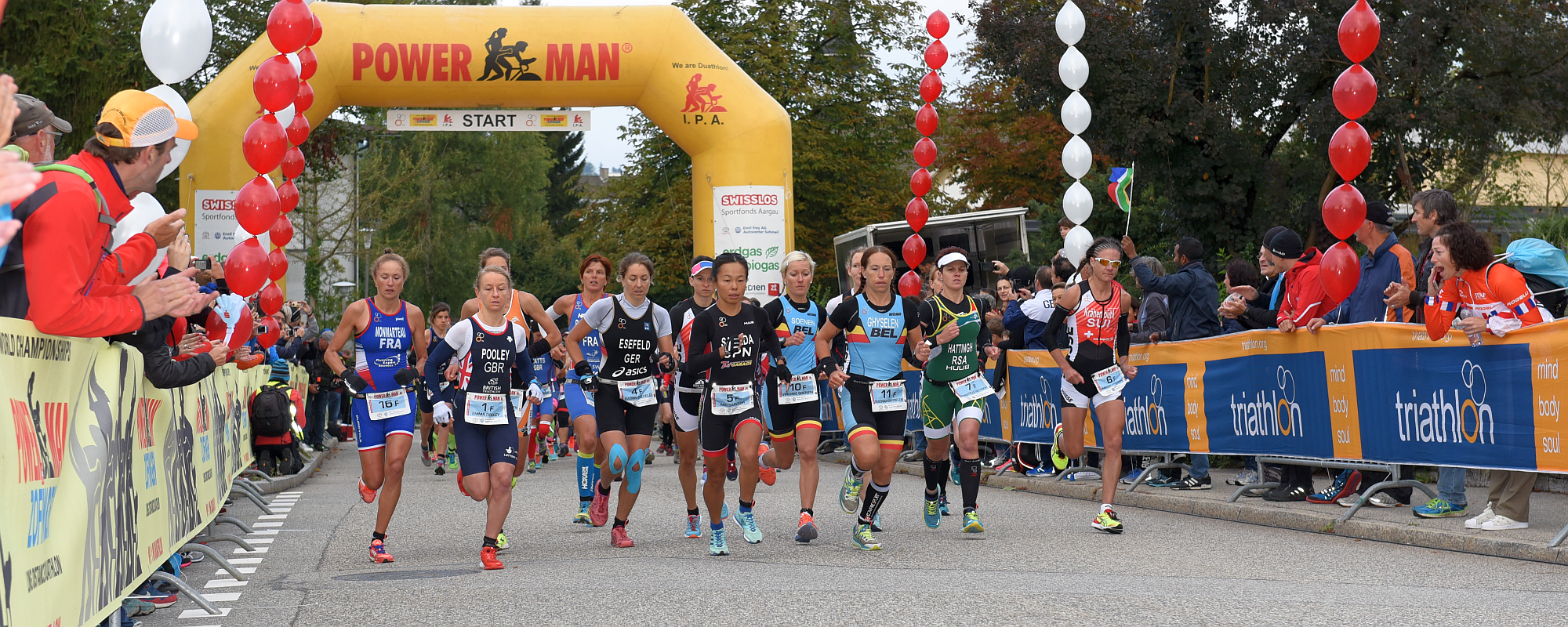
Zofingen Ladies Start

Powerman Duathlons are duathlon events that are competed over:

Short Distance: 5km run - 30km bike - 5km run

Middle Distance (10 km run, 60 km bike, 10 km run)

Long Distance (10 km run, 90- 150 km bike, 30 km run)

PowerKids, distances dependent on Age

Run-Bike-Run Duathlon of Powerman across the globe at both Age Group and Elite level. All events are draft illegal allowing competitors to compete utilizing time trial or triathlon bikes and shoes, gear following the Powerman and WT race regulations

For every day news about Powerman Duathlon world wide likes on: @powermanduathlon

Facebook : https://www.facebook.com/powermanduathlon

Instagram :

https://www.instagram.com/powermanduathlon

== Powerman World Series ==
The Powerman World Series is made up of 10-20 Powerman Duathlon races each year incorporating International Triathlon Union Continental and World Championships as well as world series races. The World Series title is contested from September to September each year with points awarded for the top positions at each event in the series, the final event of the season is the World Triathlon Long Distance Duathlon Championships Powerman Zofingen in Switzerland

== Powerman World Rankings ==
The Powerman Duathlon World Rankings are determined on a rolling format, utilising the points awarded over the previous 12 months competitions in the world series following the rules set out by the Powerman Ranking system Since 2019 there are separate Age Group World rankings as well as those for the elite. The world rankings are updated after each competition in the series. Current rankings: http://www.powerman.org/ranking-results

== Powerman Series Race winners ==
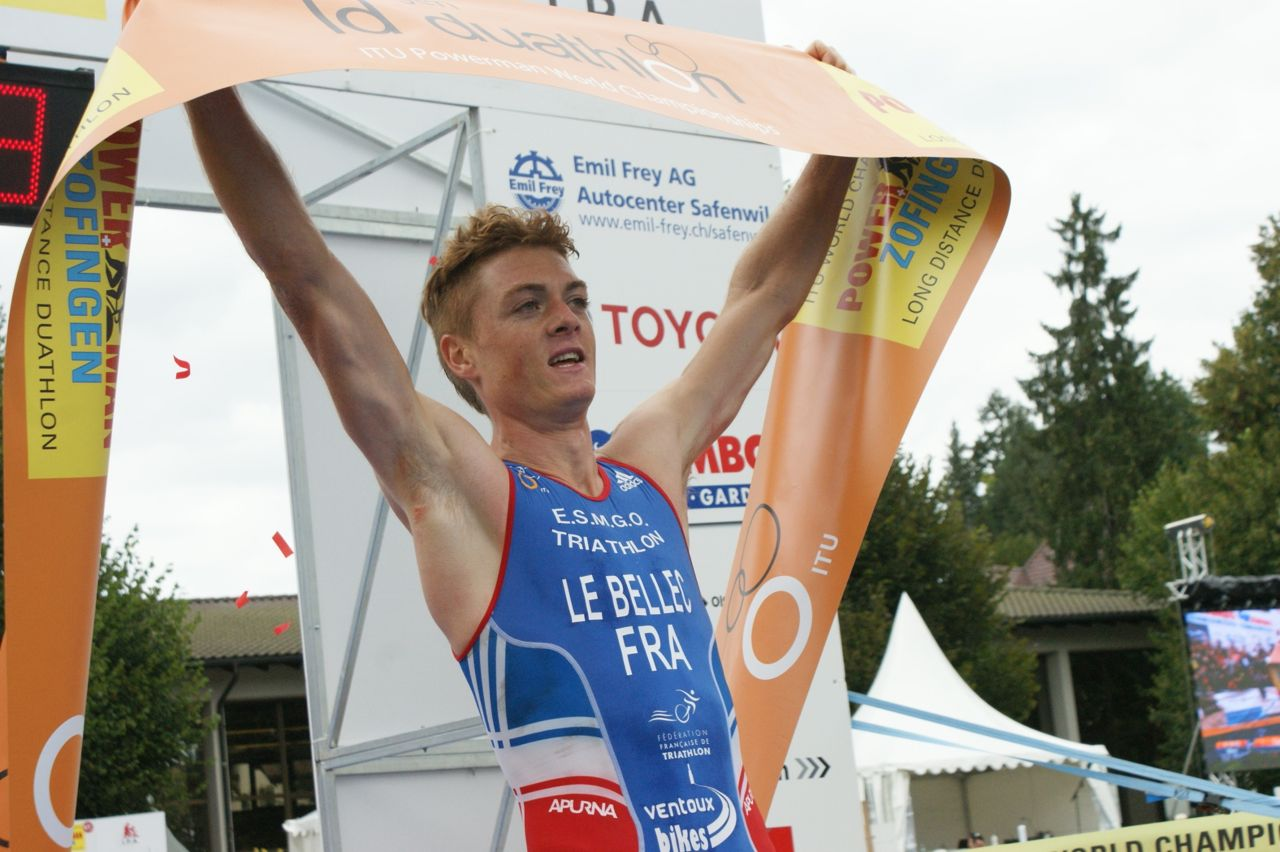
Winner

2016 World Series Race Winners
Race	Men's Winner	Women's Winner
Powerman Sweden	(United Kingdom) Peter Ellis	(Denmark) Susanne Svendsen
Powerman Norway	(Denmark) Soren Bystrup	(Denmark) Susanne Svendsen
(United States) Powerman Michigan	(Australia) Chris Leigh	(United States) Dani Fischer
Powerman Philippines	(Philippines) Emmanuel Commendador	(Japan) Airi Sawada
Powerman Philippines	(Belgium) Rob Woestenborghs	(Philippines) Monica Torres
(United States) Powerman Alabama	(Australia) Chris Leigh	(United States) Pam Cox
(United States) Powerman Florida	(United States) Jacob Rhyner	(United States) Lisa Veneziano
Powerman Spain	(Denmark) Soren Bystrup	(Spain) Mavi Garcia
Powerman Malaysia - Asian Championships	(Netherlands) Thomas Bruins	(United Kingdom) Emma Pooley
Powerman Luxembourg	(Belgium) Seppe Odeyn	(Germany) Ulrike Schwalbe
Powerman Denmark - European Championships	(Belgium) Kenneth Vandendriesche	(Switzerland) Nina Brenn
(United States) Powerman Western Virginia	(Australia) Chris Leigh	(United States) Lisa Veneziano
Powerman Germany	(Belgium) Seppe Odeyn	(Germany) Julia Viellehner
Powerman Austria	(France) Anthony Le Duey	(Austria) Victoria Schenk
Powerman Brazil	(Brazil) Bruno Pereira Matheas	(Brazil) Mariana Borges DeAndrade
Powerman Germany	(Germany) Zoltan Senczyszyn	(Germany) Miriam Van Reijen
(Switzerland) Powerman Zofingen - World Championships	(Belgium) Seppe Odeyn	(United Kingdom) Emma Pooley

2017 World Series Race Winners
Race	Men's Winner	Women's Winner
(United States) Powerman Michigan	(Australia) Chris Leigh	(United States) Erica Ruge
Powerman Philippines	(Philippines) Emmanuel Commendador	(Japan) Airi Sawada
Powerman Philippines	(France) Gael Le Bellec	(United Kingdom) Emma Pooley
(United States) Powerman Florida	(France) Gael Le Bellec	(United States) Ashley Paulson
Powerman Thailand	(Netherlands) Thomas Bruins	(Hungary) Annamaria Eberhardt-Halasz
Powerman Panama	(United States) Alistair Eeckman	(Panama) Daniela Arauja
Powerman Indonesia	(Netherlands) Thomas Bruins	(Hungary) Annamaria Eberhardt-Halasz
Powerman Spain	(Spain) Emilio Martin	(Spain) Mavi Garcia
Powerman Malaysia - Asian Championships	(Netherlands) Thomas Bruins	(Hungary) Annamaria Eberhardt-Halasz
Powerman Germany - European Championships	(Germany) Felix Kohler	(United Kingdom) Emma Pooley
Powerman China	(Australia) Dave Brown	(China) Yann Kai Oh
Powerman Germany	(Germany) Felix Kohler	(Germany) Kristina Ziemons
Powerman Brazil	(Brazil) Santiago Ascenco	(Brazil) Carolina Furrieta
(Switzerland) Powerman Zofingen - World Championships	(Russia) Maxim Kuzmin	(United Kingdom) Emma Pooley

2018 World Series Race Winners
Race	Men's Winner	Women's Winner
Powerman Philippines	(Netherlands) Thomas Bruins	(Philippines) Miscelle Gilbuena
Powerman Panama	(Venezuela) Eduar Villalta	(Panama) Williama Rojas
Powerman Spain	(Belgium) Seppe Odyen	(Netherlands) Miriam Van Reigen
(United States) Powerman Arizona	(United States) Ryan Guiliano	(United States) Lisa Roberts
Powerman Malaysia - Asian Championships	(Netherlands) Thomas Bruins	(Hungary) Annamaria Eberhardt-Halasz
Powerman Indonesia	(Netherlands) Thomas Bruins	(Italy) Irene Coletto
Powerman Germany	(Germany) Patrick Reger	(Germany) Kristina Ziemons
Powerman Denmark - European Championships	(Denmark) Soren Bystrup	(Austria) Illes Sandrina
(United States) Powerman Michigan	(United Kingdom) Peter Ellis	(United States) Jodie Taylor
Powerman Switzerland	(Germany) Felix Kohler	(Switzerland) Melanie Maurer
(Australia) Powerman Austria	(Denmark) Soren Bystrup	(Austria) Illes Sandrina
Powerman Brazil	(Brazil) Luri Vinuto Josino	(Brazil) Carolina Furrieta
(Switzerland) Powerman Zofingen - World Championships	(France) Gael Le Bellec	(Switzerland) Petra Eggenschwiler

2019 World Series Race Winners
Race	Men's Winner	Women's Winner
(United States) Powerman Arizona	(France) Gael Le Bellec	(United States) Lisa Roberts
Powerman Spain	(Belgium) Diego Van Looy	(Switzerland) Petra Eggenschwiler
Powerman Malaysia - Asian Championships	(France) Antony Costes	(Hungary) Annamaria Eberhardt-Halasz
Powerman Greece	(Belgium) Seppe Odeyn	(Switzerland) Melanie Maurer
(United States) Powerman Hawaii	(United Kingdom) Peter Ellis	(Japan) Airi Sawada
Powerman Germany	(Netherlands) Daan De Groot	(Germany) Laura Zimmermann
(United States) Powerman Michigan	(United Kingdom) Peter Ellis	(Canada) Izaura Araujo
Powerman Denmark - European Championships	(Netherlands) Daan De Groot	(Switzerland) Petra Eggenschwiler
Powerman Switzerland	(Switzerland) Michael Ott	(Switzerland) Melanie Maurer
(Switzerland) Powerman Zofingen - World Championships	(Belgium) Diego Van Looy	(Switzerland) Nina Zoller

2020 World Series Race Winners
Race	Men's Winner	Women's Winner
(United States) Powerman Arizona	(United States) Adam Feigh	(United States) Irena Ossola
Powerman Portugal	(Belgium) Seppe Odeyn	(Switzerland) Nina Zoller
2020 Season Shortened to 2 races Due to Covid 19 Pandemic

2021 World Series Race Winners
Race	Men's Winner	Women's Winner
(United States) Powerman Michigan	(United States) Ryan Rau	(United States) Kimberley Nick
Powerman Portugal	(Netherlands) Dan DeGroot	(Netherlands) Ann Schoot Uiterkamp
Powerman France	(France) Matthieu Bourgeois	(France) Marion Legrand
(Switzerland) Powerman Zofingen - World Championships	(Belgium) Seppe Odeyn	(Germany) Merle Brunnee
2021 Season Shortened to 4 races Due to Covid 19 Pandemic

2022 World Series Race Winners
Race	Men's Winner	Women's Winner
(United States) Powerman Arizona	(Australia) Matt Smith (duathlete)	(United States) Rendy Williams
Powerman Germany - European MD Championships	(Belgium) Kenneth Vandendriessche	(Netherlands) Diede Diederiks
Powerman Denmark - World MD Championships	(Slovakia) Ondrej Kubo	(Switzerland) Melane Maurer
Powerman France	(France) Dorian Muller	(Belgium) Lotte Claes
(Switzerland) Powerman Zofingen - World LD Championships	(France) Matthieu Bourgeois	(Switzerland) Melane Maurer
Powerman Malaysia - Asian MD Championships	(Australia) Matt Smith (duathlete)	(Malaysia) Tahira Zaid

2023 World Series Race Winners
Race	Men's Winner	Women's Winner
Powerman Germany	(Germany) Simon Huckstein	(Germany) Maja Betz
Powerman Malaysia - Asian MD Championships	(France) Malo Moysan	(Philippines) Trupa Merry Joy
(Switzerland) Powerman Zofingen - World LD Championships	(Denmark) Simon Jorn Hanson	(Germany) Merle Brunnee

2024 World Series Race Winners
Race	Men's Winner	Women's Winner
Powerman Germany - European Middle Distance Championships	(Denmark) Simon Jorn Hanson	(Switzerland) Melane Maurer
Powerman Malaysia	(Philippines) John Leerams Chicano	(United States) Rendy Williams
(Switzerland) Powerman Zofingen - World LD Championships	(France) Emile Blondel Hermant	(Germany) Merle Brunnee
(Colombia) Powerman Columbia	(France) Malo Moysan	(Colombia) Andrea Morales

== Power(wo)man World Series Medallists ==
Year	Gold	Silver	Bronze
2009	(Sweden) Camila Lindholm	(Switzerland) Erika Csomor	(United Kingdom) Jessica Petersson
2010	(Sweden) Camila Lindholm	(Switzerland) Jacqueline Uebelhart	(Switzerland) Erika Csomor
2011	(Netherlands) May Kerstens	(New Zealand) Melanie Burke	(Germany) Ulrike Schwalbe
2012	(Sweden) Eva Nystrom	(United Kingdom) Lucy Gossage	(Denmark) Susanne Svendsen
2013	(Sweden) Eva Nystrom	(Germany) Julia Viellehner	(Austria) Simone Helfenschneider-Ofner
2014	(Denmark) Susanne Svendsen	(United Kingdom) Emma Pooley	(Sweden) Eva Nystrom
2015	(Denmark) Susanne Svendsen	(United Kingdom) Emma Pooley	(Germany) Katrin Esefeld
2016	(Denmark) Susanne Svendsen	(Switzerland) Nina Brenn	(United Kingdom) Emma Pooley
2017	(United Kingdom) Emma Pooley	(Netherlands) Mirriam Van Reijen	(Japan) Airi Sawada
2018	(Switzerland) Melanie Maurer	(Austria) Illes Sandrina	(Switzerland) Petra Eggenschwiler
2019	(Switzerland) Melanie Maurer	(Switzerland) Nina Zoller	(Switzerland) Petra Eggenschwiler
2020	(Switzerland) Nina Zoller	(United States) Irena Ossola	(Austria) Sigrid Herndler
2021	(Germany) Merle Brunnee	(Slovakia) Nikola Corbova	(Switzerland) Sarah Noemi Frienden
2022	(Switzerland) Melanie Maurer	(Netherlands) Marieke Brouwers	(Denmark) Line Thams
2023	(Germany) Merle Brunnee	(Germany) Maja Betz	(Switzerland) Melanie Maurer
2024	(Germany) Merle Brunnee	(Germany) Nelly Rassmann	(Germany) Maja Betz

== Powerman World Series Medallists ==
Year	Gold	Silver	Bronze
2009	(Belgium) Joerie Vansteelant	(Switzerland) Andy Sutz	(France) Anthony Le Duey
2010	(France) Anthony Le Duey	(Switzerland) Andy Sutz	(Austria) Karl Prungraber
2011	(Belgium) Joerie Vansteelant	(France) Anthony Le Duey	(Switzerland) Andy Sutz
2012	(Belgium) Joerie Vansteelant	(France) Anthony Le Duey	(Belgium) Rob Woestenborghs
2013	(Belgium) Rob Woestenborghs	(Switzerland) Andy Sutz	(Switzerland) Andre Moser
2014	(France) Yannick Cadalen	(Denmark) Soren Bystrup	(France) Gael Le Bellec
2015	(France) Gael Le Bellec	(Denmark) Soren Bystrup	(Belgium) Seppe Odeyn
2016	(Belgium) Seppe Odeyn	(France) Gael Le Bellec	(Netherlands) Thomas Bruins
2017	(Belgium) Seppe Odeyn	(Netherlands) Thomas Bruins	(Denmark) Soren Bystrup
2018	(Netherlands) Thomas Bruins	(Germany) Felix Kohler	(France) Gael Le Bellec
2019	(Netherlands) Daan De Groot	(United Kingdom) Peter Ellis	(Belgium) Diego Van Looy
2020	(United Kingdom) Peter Ellis	(Belgium) Seppe Odeyn	(United States) Adam Feigh
2021	(Belgium) Seppe Odeyn	(France) Mathiea Bourgeois	(Netherlands) Daan De Groot
2022	(Belgium) Kenneth Vandendriessch	(Netherlands) Lars Van Der Knaap	(Netherlands) Daan De Groot
2023	(Denmark) Simon Jorn Hanson	(France) Malo Moysan	(France) Emile Blondel Hermant
2024	(France) Emile Blondel Hermant	(Belgium) Seppe Odeyn	(Denmark) Simon Jorn Hanson
