= Matt Smith (duathlete) =

Australian duathlete (b.1996)

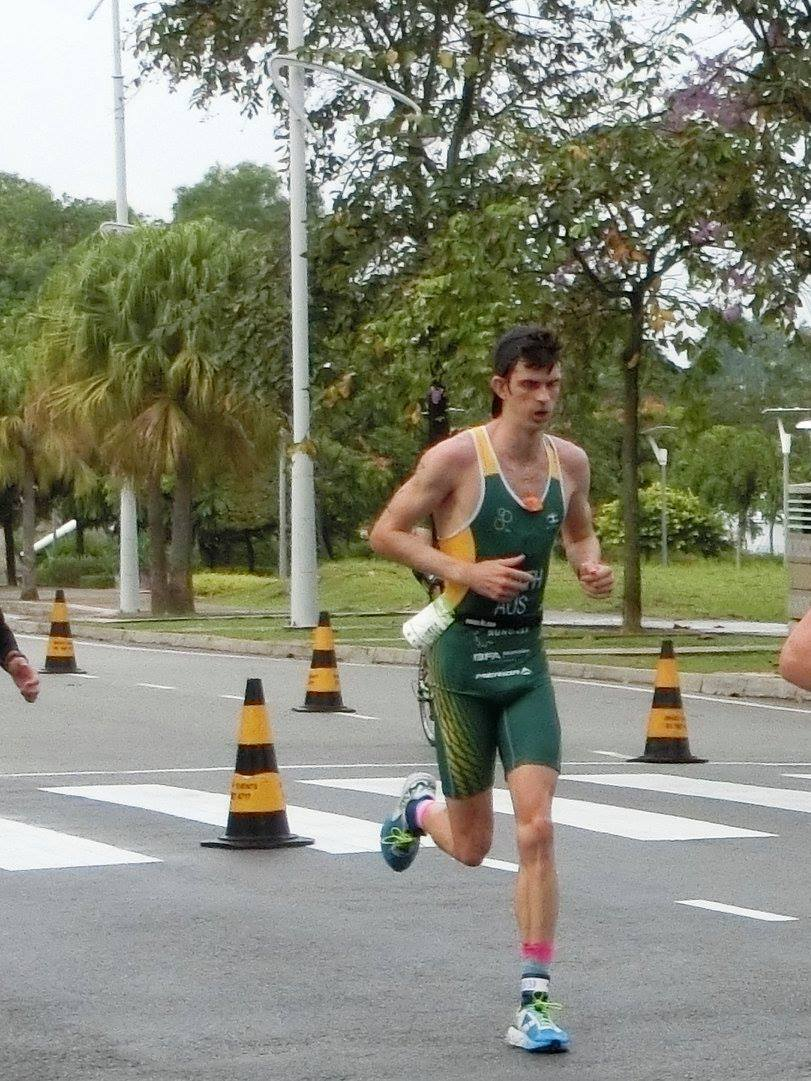
- Matt Smith running at Powerman Putrajaya

Personal information
- Nickname: Smithie
- Born: 27 July 1996 (age 29) Osborne Park, Western Australia, Australia
- Education: Trinity College & Murdoch University
- Height: 1.86 m (6 ft 1 in)
- Weight: 67 kg (148 lb)
- Other interests: Table tennis, running, cycling

Sport
- Country: Australia
- Coached by: Stuart Durham (Eclipse Performance Centre)
Medal record
Representing Australia
Men's Duathlon
ITU Duathlon World Championships Sprint 16-19AG
Gold medal – first place	2015 Duathlon World Championships	2015 Adelaide
ITU Duathlon World Championships Standard 20-24AG
Gold medal – first place	2016 Duathlon World Championships	2016 Aviles
Powerman
Silver medal – second place	2017 Powerman Middle Distance Asian Championships	2017 Malaysia
Silver medal – second place	2018 Powerman Middle Distance Asian Championships	2018 Malaysia
Gold medal – first place	2022 Powerman Arizona	2022 USA

Matt Smith is an Australian duathlete from Perth, Western Australia. He is the 2015 Sprint (16-19) and 2016 Standard (20-24) Age Group Duathlon World Champion. He was also the Australian Duathlon Champion in 2014 and 2015 (16-19), and 4th place elite in 2016. He is currently ranked number 82 in the Powerman Duathlon world rankings.

== Early life ==
Smith began his sporting life with golf. He was brought into the sport early by his father, Paul Smith, a golf expert.

Smith attended Trinity College from 2011 where he was introduced to the sport of cross country. Smith was no stand out runner but with patience and determination was able to excel. He was introduced to multi sport where friend Kurt Wesley showed him the ropes of the duathlon. Through the help of Eclipse Fitness (Stuart Durham) Smith excelled in cycling as well as running. He went on to compete in both the sprint distance duathlon World Championships and the standard distance World Championships, coming away with two consecutive world titles in this Age Group. At this time his talet was recognised and was rewarded with a professional licence. Smith now races under an elite license and specializes in the Powerman Duathlon format of Duathlon.
