= Peter Ellis (duathlete) =

British duathlete

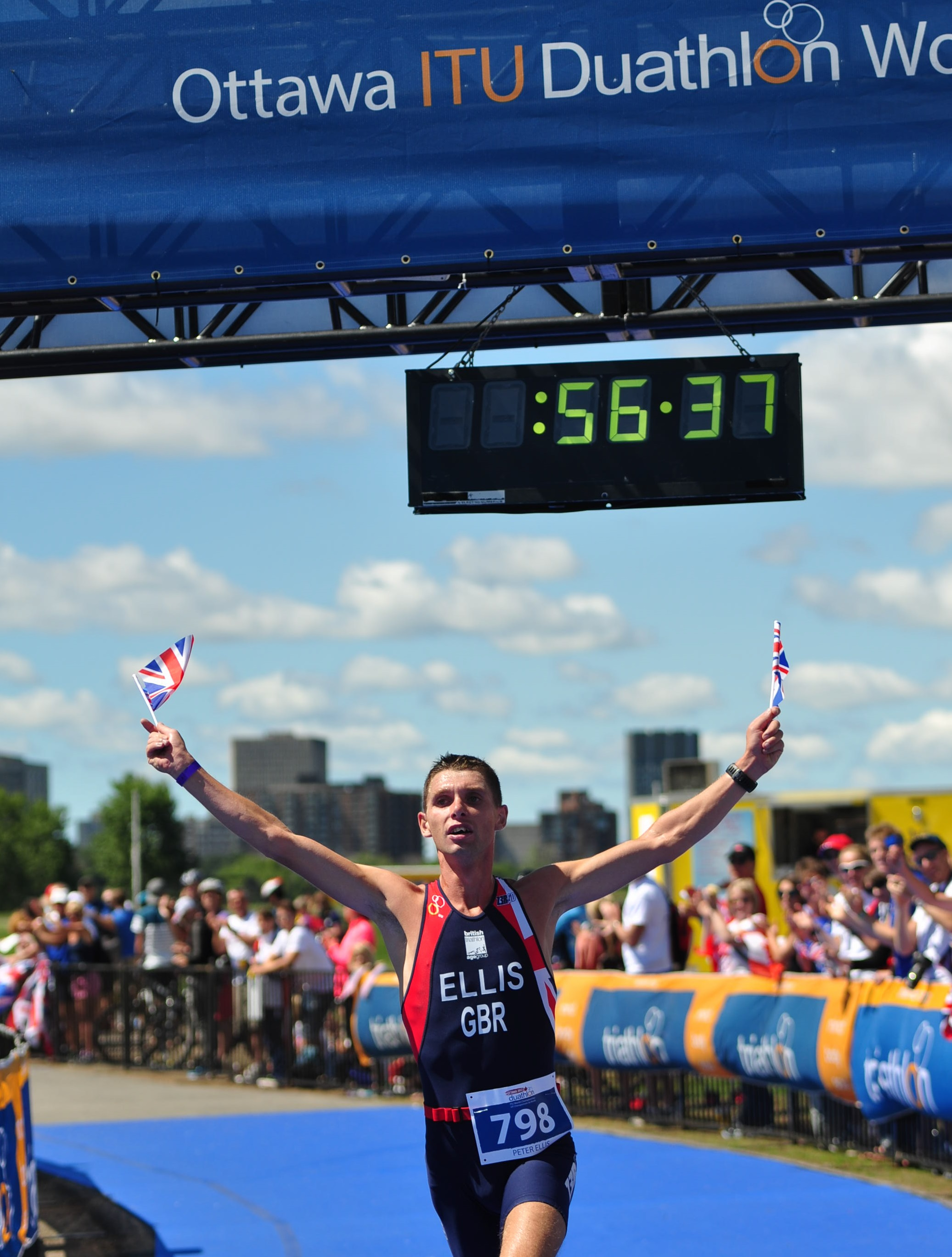
- Ellis at the ITU Duathlon World Championships

Personal information
- Born: Devon, England, UK

Sport
- Sport: Duathlon
Medal record
Representing Great Britain
ITU Duathlon World Championships AG
Gold medal – first place	2013 World Sprint Champion	Ottawa (Canada)
ETU Duathlon European Championships AG
Gold medal – first place	2014 European Sprint Champion	Horst (Netherlands)
Bronze medal – third place	2022 European MD Championionships	Alsdorf (Germany)
Powerman World Series Races Elite
Gold medal – first place	2015 Powerman Sweden	Gothenburg (Sweden)
Bronze medal – third place	2017 Powerman Malaysia	Putrajaya (Malaysia)
Bronze medal – third place	2018 Powerman Panama	Pan City (Panama)
Gold medal – first place	2018 Powerman Michigan	Frankenmuth (United States)
Gold medal – first place	2019 Powerman Hawaii	Kona (United States)
Gold medal – first place	2019 Powerman Michigan	Frankenmuth (United States)
Silver medal – second place	2020 Powerman Arizona	Phoenix (United States)
Powerman World Series Elite
Silver medal – second place	2019 Powerman World Series
BTF Duathlon British Championships AG
Gold medal – first place	2014 British Champion	Olney (United Kingdom)
Gold medal – first place	2017 British Champion	Bedford (United Kingdom)
ETF Duathlon English Championships AG
Gold medal – first place	2015 English Champion	Oulton Park (England)
Silver medal – second place	2016 English Silver	Stockton (England)
Silver medal – second place	2017 English Silver	Oulton Park (England)
UK Armed Forces Championships
Silver medal – second place	2011 UKAF Steeple Chase Silver	Portsmouth (United Kingdom)
Bronze medal – third place	2012 UKAF Marathon Bronze	London (United Kingdom)
Bronze medal – third place	2016 UKAF Duathlon Bronze	Abingdon (United Kingdom)
Gold medal – first place	2023 UKAF Masters Duathlon Champion	Yeovil (United Kingdom)
Silver medal – second place	2024 UKAF Masters Duathlon Silver	Cottesmore (United Kingdom)
RAF Championships
Gold medal – first place	2009 RAF Steeple Chase Champion	RAF Cosford (United Kingdom)
Gold medal – first place	2009 RAF 10 mile Champion	RAF Henlow (United Kingdom)
Gold medal – first place	2010 RAF 10 mile Champion	RAF Henlow (United Kingdom)
Gold medal – first place	2014 RAF Duathlon Champion	Clumber Park (United Kingdom)
Gold medal – first place	2015 RAF Duathlon Champion	Clumber Park (United Kingdom)
Gold medal – first place	2016 RAF Duathlon Champion	Clumber Park (United Kingdom)
Gold medal – first place	2017 RAF Duathlon Champion	Clumber Park (United Kingdom)
Gold medal – first place	2018 RAF Sprint Triathlon Champion	RAFC Cranwell (United Kingdom)
Gold medal – first place	2019 RAF Duathlon Champion	RAF Cosford (United Kingdom)
Gold medal – first place	2019 RAF Sprint Triathlon Champion	RAFC Cranwell (United Kingdom)
Gold medal – first place	2020 RAF Sprint Triathlon Champion	Virtual (United Kingdom)
Gold medal – first place	2023 RAF Masters Duathlon Champion	Clumber Park (United Kingdom)
Gold medal – first place	2024 RAF Duathlon Champion	Mallory Park (United Kingdom)

Peter Ellis is a British Elite and Age Group duathlete from The New Forest, England. Competing at Elite level he is a four time Powerman Duathlon World Series race winner with wins in Gothenburg (Sweden 2015), Michigan (USA 2018 and 2019) and Hawaii (USA 2019), securing further podium finishes in Putrajaya (Malaysia 2017), Panama City (Panama 2018) and Arizona (USA 2020). He finished the 2016 Powerman Duathlon World Series in 29th, 2017 in 7th, 2018 in 11th and 2019 as the silver medalist. He achieved the Powerman Duathlon World number 1 ranking in 2020 and World Triathlon long distance Duathlon ranking of 2nd in September 2019. Selected by British Triathlon to compete for the Great Britain Elite team at the ETU European Elite middle-distance duathlon Championships Copenhagen (Denmark 2016), St Wendel (Germany 2017) and Viborg (Denmark 2019), the ASTC Asian Elite middle-distance duathlon Championships Putrajaya (Malaysia 2018, 2019 and 2022), and the ITU World Elite long-distance duathlon championships Powerman Zofingen (Switzerland 2017 and 2019).

== Sporting career ==
Peter Oz Ellis' sporting career started initially as a distance runner, progressing as a club runner with Newquay Road Runners, Hayle Runners, Abingdon AAC, Tipton Harriers and Vale of Aylesbury Athletic Club as well as representing the RAF and UK Armed Forces teams and county representation for Cornwall, Oxfordshire and Shropshire, achieving success in cross country, steeple chase, road running and ultra distance. Notable results include 5th at the UK Inter Counties 10 mile road championships, 7th at the English National 50 km road Championships and 2nd in the Steeple Chase at the European Allied Air Forces Championships.

In 2012 he changed focus to duathlon and qualified to represent the Great Britain Age Group team for the ETU European and ITU World Sprint Duathlon Championships with wins at both Althorp duathlon and Oulton Park in spring 2013. Competing in duathlons as an age group athlete he won Royal Air Force, United Kingdom Armed Forces, English National, British National, European and World Championships . He was awarded the RAF sportsman of the year award in 2013 after this breakthrough year. An award that he received again in 2019 after finishing the Powerman World Series in 2nd.
