= Matthew White (rugby league) =

Australian rugby league footballer (born 1984)

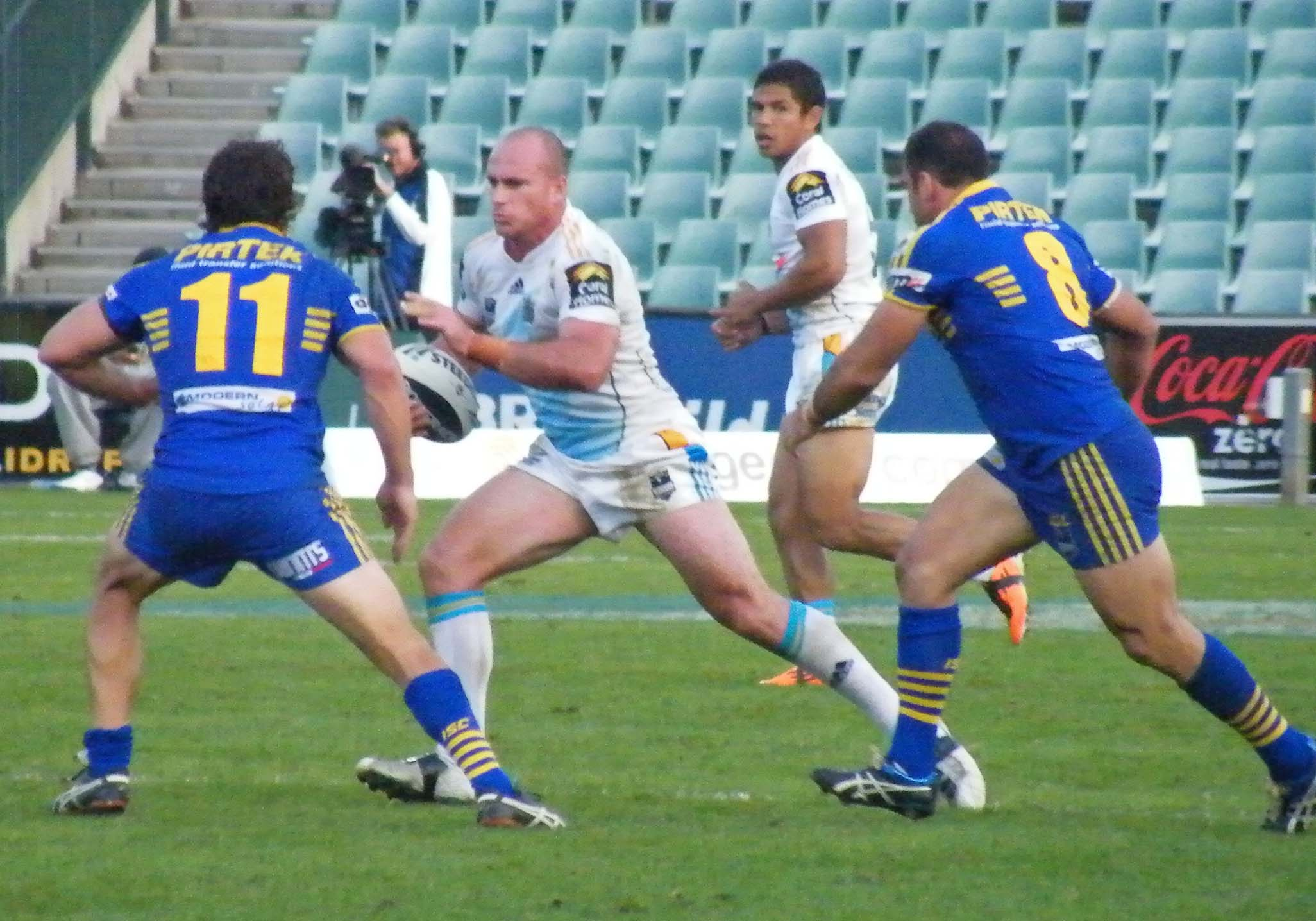
- White (middle) playing for the Titans in 2011

Personal information
- Born: 17 May 1984 (age 42) Armidale, New South Wales, Australia

Playing information
- Height: 188 cm (6 ft 2 in)
- Weight: 113 kg (17 st 11 lb)
- Position: Prop
Club
Years	Team	Pld	T	G	FG	P
2005–08	Newcastle Knights	28	0	0	0	0
2009–15	Gold Coast Titans	125	1	0	0	4
2016	Melbourne Storm	3	0	0	0	0
	Total	156	1	0	0	4

Matthew White (born 17 May 1984) is a former Australian rugby league footballer. He played as a prop and previously played for the Newcastle Knights, Gold Coast Titans and the Melbourne Storm in the National Rugby League.

== Background ==
Born in Armidale, New South Wales, White played his junior rugby league for the Inverell Hawks, before being signed by the Newcastle Knights.

== Playing career ==
=== 2005 ===
In round 1 of the 2005 NRL season, White made his NRL debut for the Newcastle Knights against the Melbourne Storm.

=== 2009 ===
In 2009, after playing 28 games for the Knights, White joined the Gold Coast Titans on a one-year contract. He made his Gold Coast debut in round 1 against his former club Newcastle.

=== 2011 ===
White made 23 appearances for the Gold Coast Titans in the 2011 NRL season as the club finished last on the table and claimed the wooden spoon.

=== 2012 ===
On 11 July, White re-signed with the Gold Coast on a three-year contract.

=== 2013 ===
In 2013, White suffered an Anterior cruciate ligament injury which ruled him out for the entire 2013 NRL season.

=== 2014 ===
On 4 June, White extended his contract with the Gold Coast from the end of 2015 to the end of 2016.

=== 2015 ===
On 25 August, White signed a one-year contract with the Melbourne Storm starting in 2016, after being released from the final year of his Gold Coast contract.

=== 2016 ===
White managed to make only three appearances for Melbourne in the 2016 NRL season as the club won the Minor Premiership. White did not feature in the club's finals campaign or the 2016 NRL Grand Final.

=== Later career ===
White later played in England for Barrow Raiders in 2017, retiring at the end of the 2018 Queensland Cup season after a final season with the Burleigh Bears.
