= Peter Ellis (rugby league) =

Australian rugby league footballer

Peter (PJ) Ellis
Personal information
- Full name: Peter J Ellis
- Born: 12 December 1976 (age 48) Tingha NSW, Australia

Playing information
- Position: Second-row, Prop
Club
Years	Team	Pld	T	G	FG	P
1997–99	Eastern Suburbs	3	0	0	0	0
2003	St. George Illawarra	1	0	0	0	0
	Total	4	0	0	0	0

Peter Ellis (born 12 December 1976) is a former professional rugby league footballer who played for the St. George Illawarra Dragons and Eastern Suburbs.
