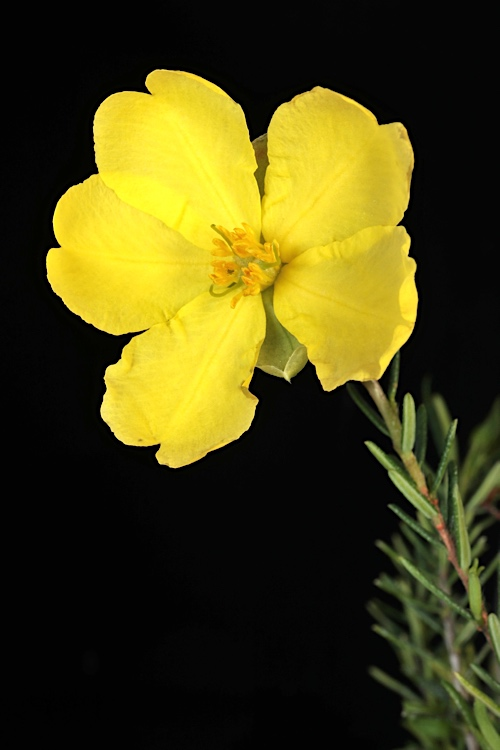
- Hibbertia fruticosa subsp. fruticosa in the ANBG

Scientific classification
- Kingdom: Plantae
- Clade: Tracheophytes
- Clade: Angiosperms
- Clade: Eudicots
- Order: Dilleniales
- Family: Dilleniaceae
- Genus: Hibbertia
- Species: H. fruticosa

Binomial name
- Hibbertia fruticosa Toelken

= Hibbertia fruticosa =

Species of plant

Hibbertia fruticosa is a species of flowering plant in the family Dilleniaceae and is endemic to New South Wales. It is a woody shrub with linear to lance-shaped leaves and yellow flowers arranged singly on the ends of short side shoots, with eighteen to thirty-five stamens arranged around three carpels.

== Description ==
Hibbertia fruticosa is a woody shrub that typically grows up to 1.2 m (3 ft 11 in) high and has a few erect, much-branched stems. The leaves are linear to lance-shaped, 3.8–5.5 mm (0.15–0.22 in) long and 0.5–0.7 mm (0.020–0.028 in) wide on a petiole up to 0.6 mm (0.024 in) long. The flowers are arranged singly on the ends of short side shoots on a peduncle 2.5–4 mm (0.098–0.157 in) long. There are linear to elliptic bracts 1.4–1.7 mm (0.055–0.067 in) long. The outer sepals lobes are 5.2–5.8 mm (0.20–0.23 in) long and the inner lobes 6.0–6.6 mm (0.24–0.26 in) long. The five petals are broadly egg-shaped with the narrower end towards the base, yellow and up to 9.1 mm (0.36 in) long. There are eighteen to thirty-five stamens arranged around the three hairy carpels, each carpel with four to six ovules.

== Taxonomy ==
Hibbertia fruticosa was first formally described in 2013 by Hellmut R. Toelken in the Journal of the Adelaide Botanic Gardens from specimens collected by Ruurd Dirk Hoogland on the Mount Kaputar Road in 1972. The specific epithet (fruticosa) means "woody".

In the same journal, Toelken described two subspecies and the names are accepted by the Australian Plant Census:

- Hibbertia fruticosa Toelken subsp. fruticosa has distinctly pointed leaves and flowers in October and November;
- Hibbertia fruticosa subsp. pilligaensis Toelken lacks a distinct point on the end of the leaves and flowers from October to December.

== Distribution and habitat ==
This hibbertia grows on rocky slopes in woodland. Subspecies fruticosa occurs in the northern part of the Nandewar Range and subspecies pilligaensis occurs on the North West Slopes of central New South Wales, including in the Pilliga Nature Reserve.

== See also ==
- List of Hibbertia species
