= Bushy Mountain =

Mountain in New South Wales, Australia

- Location within New South Wales

Highest point
- Coordinates: 30°18′24″S 150°12′26″E

Geography
- Location: North West Slopes, New South Wales, Australia
- Parent range: Nandewar Range, Great Dividing Range

Bushy Mountain, a mountain of the Nandewar Range, a spur of the Great Dividing Range, is located in the North West Slopes region of New South Wales, Australia. Busy Mountain is situated east of Narrabri within the Mount Kaputar National Park.

With an elevation of 1,260 metres (4,130 ft) above sea level, Bushy Mount is part of the remnants of the Nandewar extinct volcano that ceased activity about 17 million years ago after 4 million years of activity.

== See also ==
- List of mountains of Australia § New South Wales
