= Hibbertia florida =

Scientific classification
- Kingdom: Plantae
- Clade: Tracheophytes
- Clade: Angiosperms
- Clade: Eudicots
- Order: Dilleniales
- Family: Dilleniaceae
- Genus: Hibbertia
- Species: H. florida

Binomial name
- Hibbertia florida Toelken

Species of flowering plant

Hibbertia florida is a species of flowering plant in the family Dilleniaceae and is endemic to New South Wales. It is a small shrub with oblong to lance-shaped leaves and yellow flowers arranged on the ends of branchlets, with twelve to twenty-eight stamens arranged around three carpels.

== Description ==
Hibbertia florida is a low-lying to spreading, much-branched shrub that typically grows up to 80 cm (31 in) high. The leaves are oblong to lance-shaped, 2.5–5.0 mm (0.098–0.197 in) long and 1.0–1.4 mm (0.039–0.055 in) wide on a petiole up to 0.7 mm (0.028 in) long. The flowers are arranged on the ends of branches on a pedicel 3–5.5 mm (0.12–0.22 in) long. There are linear to elliptic bracts 2.1–3.5 mm (0.083–0.138 in) long. The outer sepals lobes are 5.3–5.8 mm (0.21–0.23 in) long and the inner lobes slightly shorter. The five petals are broadly egg-shaped with the narrower end towards the base, yellow and up to 9.6 mm (0.38 in) long. There are twelve to twenty-eight stamens arranged around the three hairy carpels, each carpel with four ovules.

== Taxonomy ==
Hibbertia florida was first formally described in 2013 by Hellmut R. Toelken in the Journal of the Adelaide Botanic Gardens from specimens he collected on Mount Dowe in 1993. The specific epithet (florida) refers to the carpets of yellow flowers seen on rock shelves.

In the same journal, Toelken described two subspecies and the names are accepted by the Australian Plant Census:

- Hibbertia florida subsp. angustinervis Toelken is a shrub 0.4–1.2 m (1 ft 4 in – 3 ft 11 in) tall with erect to spreading, woody branches, flowering from October to December;
- Hibbertia florida Toelken subsp. florida is a shrublet 0.1–0.4 m (3.9 in – 1 ft 3.7 in) tall with low-lying to prostrate, wiry branches, flowering in October and November.

== Distribution and habitat ==
This hibbertia grows in shallow rocky soil in forest. Subspecies angustinervis occurs in and near the Warrumbungle National Park and the autonym is common in Mount Kaputar National Park.

== See also ==
- List of Hibbertia species
