= Grattai Mountain =

Mountain in Australia

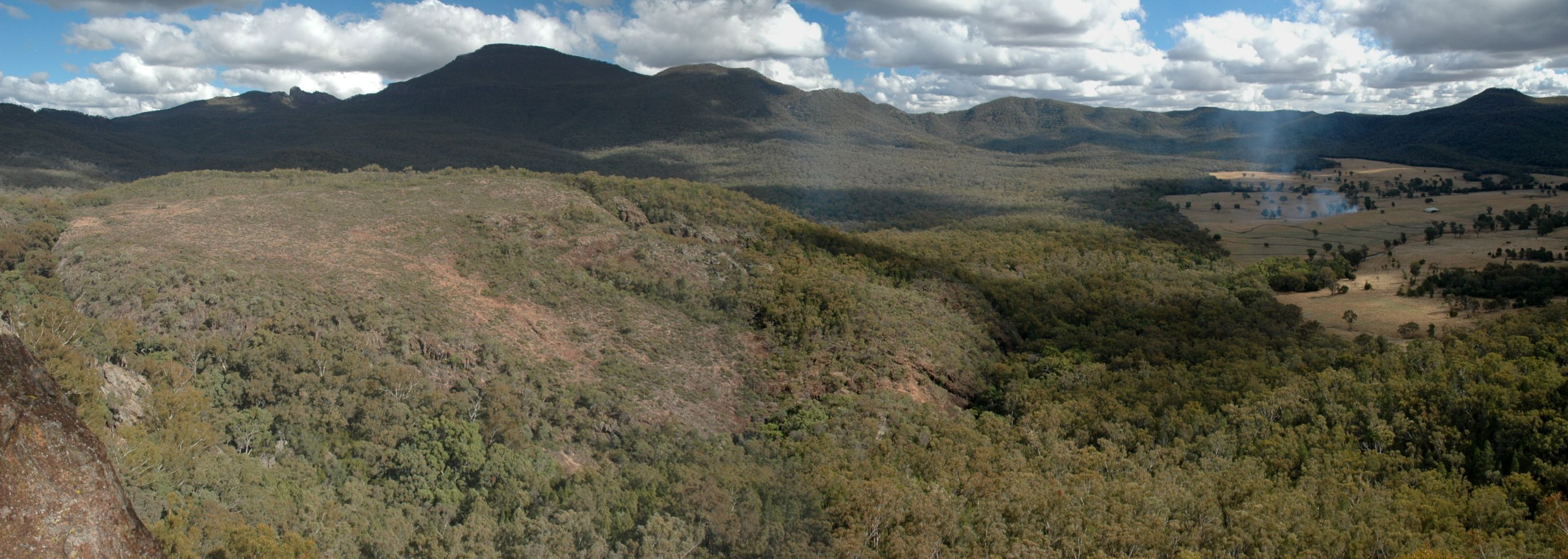
- Grattai Mountain is the peak on the left. The peak on the right is Castle Top Mountain.

Highest point
- Elevation: 1,301 m (4,268 ft)
- Coordinates: 30°06′S 150°04′E

Geography
- Location within New South Wales
- Location: North West Slopes, New South Wales, Australia
- Parent range: Nandewar Range

The Grattai Mountain, a mountain located within the Nandewar Range, is situated within the North West Slopes region of New South Wales, Australia. The mountain was formed by the Nandewar Volcano around 21 million years ago.

The mountain has an elevation of 1,301 metres (4,268 ft) above sea level and lies within the Mount Kaputar National Park. It is rarely climbed due to its isolation, lack of walking tracks and the cliffs which almost encircle the summit plateau. For those who do make it to the top, a visitors log is located in a metal box underneath a large rock.

== See also ==
- List of mountains of Australia § New South Wales
