= Eucalyptus volcanica =

Scientific classification
- Kingdom: Plantae
- Clade: Tracheophytes
- Clade: Angiosperms
- Clade: Eudicots
- Clade: Rosids
- Order: Myrtales
- Family: Myrtaceae
- Genus: Eucalyptus
- Species: E. volcanica

Binomial name
- Eucalyptus volcanica L.A.S.Johnson & K.D.Hill

Species of eucalyptus

Eucalyptus volcanica is a species of tree that is endemic to northern New South Wales. It has rough, fibrous to flaky bark on the trunk, smooth bark above, lance-shaped or curved adult leaves, flower buds in groups of seven, white or creamy white flowers and cup-shaped or barrel-shaped fruit.

== Description ==
Eucalyptus volcanica is a tree that typically grows to a height of 25 m (82 ft) and forms a lignotuber. It has varying amounts of rough, fibrous to flaky grey bark on the trunk, smooth grey to green bark above. Young plants and coppice regrowth have sessile, glaucous, egg-shaped to round leaves that are 50–90 mm (2.0–3.5 in) long, 20–70 mm (0.79–2.76 in) wide and arranged in opposite pairs. Adult leaves are arranged alternately, the same shade of glossy green on both sides, lance-shaped or curved, 100–190 mm (3.9–7.5 in) long and 13–30 mm (0.51–1.18 in) wide, tapering to a petiole 15–35 mm (0.59–1.38 in) long. The flower buds are arranged in leaf axils on a flattened, unbranched peduncle 8–15 mm (0.31–0.59 in) long, the individual buds on pedicels 1–4 mm (0.039–0.157 in) long. Mature buds are cylindrical to pear-shaped, 6–8 mm (0.24–0.31 in) long and 3–4 mm (0.12–0.16 in) wide with a conical or beaked operculum. The flowers are white or creamy white and the fruit is a woody, cup-shaped or barrel-shaped capsule 6–10 mm (0.24–0.39 in) long and 6–9 mm (0.24–0.35 in) wide with the valves near rim level.

== Taxonomy and naming ==
Eucalyptus volcanica was first formally described in 1990 by Lawrie Johnson and Ken Hill from specimens collected by Hill near Mount Lindesay in 1986. The specific epithet (volcanica) refers to the volcanic substrates, including trachyte on which this species grows.

== Distribution and habitat ==
This tree grows on shallow soils, usually over trachyte, on elevated parts of the Nandewar and Warrumbungle Ranges.
