= Mount Ningadhun =

Mountain in New South Wales, Australia

- Castle Rock, Ningadoon (Hunt), Ningadhun
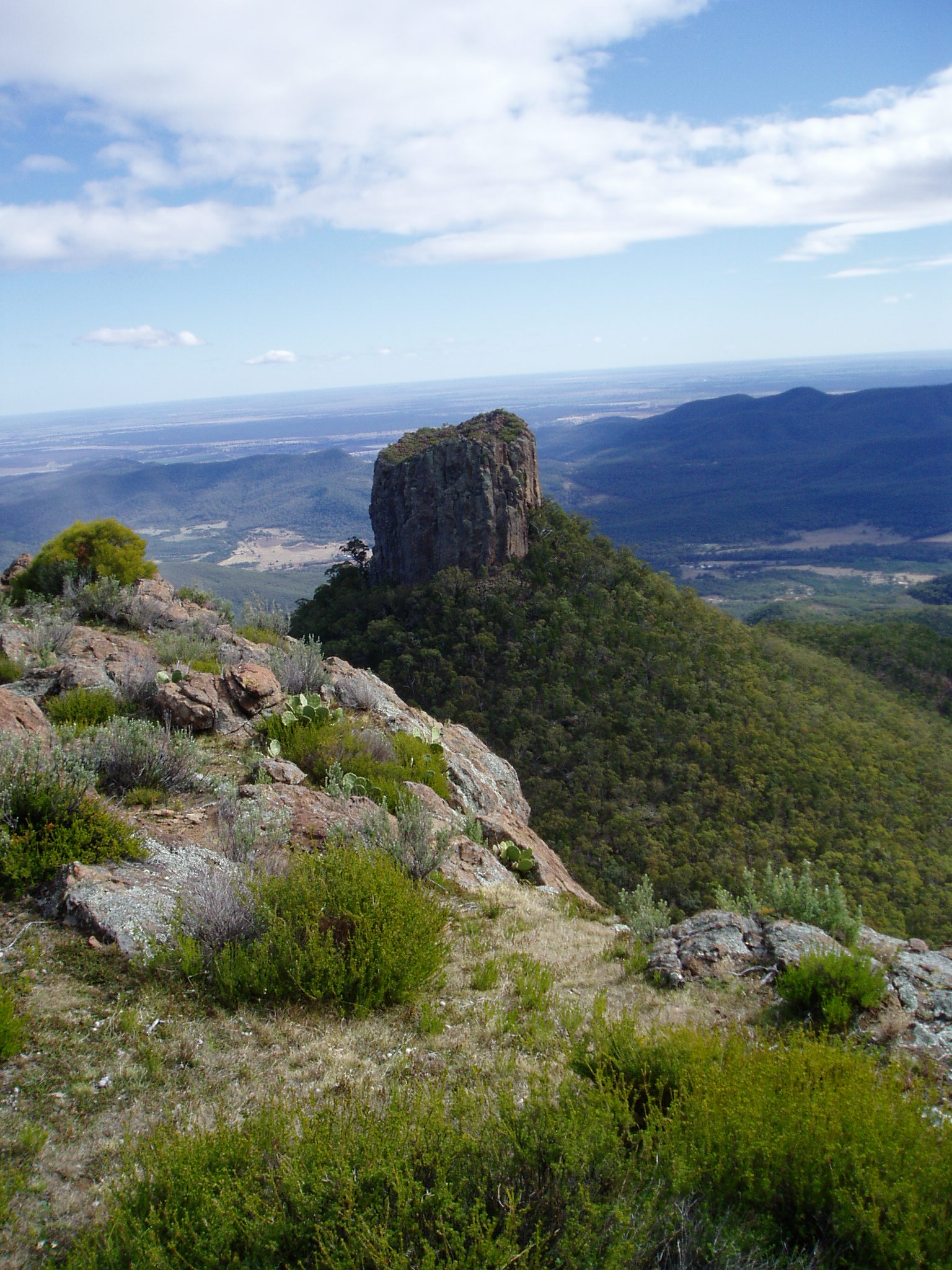

Highest point
- Elevation: 1,373 m (4,505 ft)
- Coordinates: 30°17′17″S 150°04′12″E

Geography
- Location within New South Wales
- Location: North West Slopes, New South Wales, Australia
- Parent range: Nandewar Range

Mount Ningadhun, also known as Castle Rock, Ningadoon (Hunt), and Ningadhun, is a mountain on the Nandewar Range, a spur off the Great Dividing Range, is located in the North West Slopes region of New South Wales, Australia. Mount Ningadhun is situated east of Narrabri, within the Mount Kaputar National Park

With an elevation of 1,373 metres (4,505 ft) above sea level, Mount Ningadhun is a prominent volcanic plug and part of the remnants of the Nandewar extinct volcano that ceased activity about 17 million years ago after 4 million years of activity.

== See also ==
- List of mountains of Australia § New South Wales
