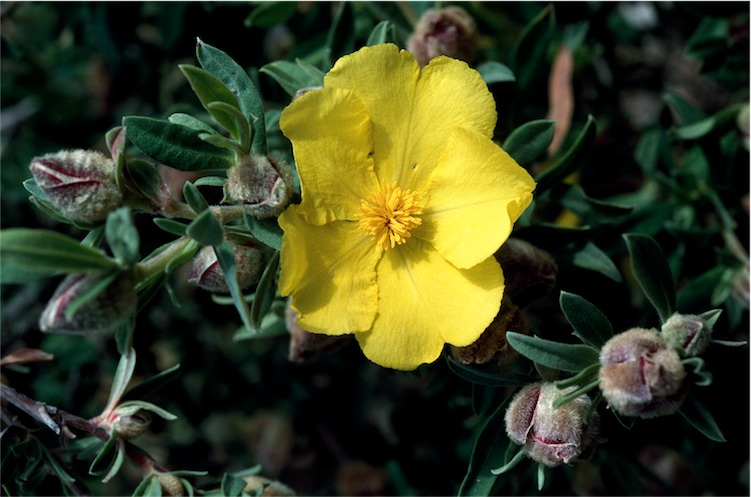
- in the Australian National Botanic Gardens

Scientific classification
- Kingdom: Plantae
- Clade: Tracheophytes
- Clade: Angiosperms
- Clade: Eudicots
- Order: Dilleniales
- Family: Dilleniaceae
- Genus: Hibbertia
- Species: H. kaputarensis

Binomial name
- Hibbertia kaputarensis B.J.Conn

= Hibbertia kaputarensis =

Species of flowering plant

Hibbertia kaputarensis is a species of flowering plant in the family Dilleniaceae, and is endemic to the Mount Kaputar area. It is a shrub with low-lying branches, oblong to lance-shaped leaves and yellow flowers with forty to about one hundred stamens arranged around three carpels.

== Description ==
Hibbertia kaputarensis is a shrub that typically grows to a height of 40–60 cm (16–24 in) and has low-lying branches. The leaves are lance-shaped with the narrower end towards the base or more or less oblong, 10–40 mm (0.39–1.57 in) long, 2–7 mm (0.079–0.276 in) wide and mostly covered with greyish hairs. The flowers are arranged on short side shoots and are sessile. The sepals are 6–10 mm (0.24–0.39 in) long and densely hairy on the outside, apart from on the reddish edges. The petals are yellow, 10–15 mm (0.39–0.59 in) long and there are forty to more than one hundred stamens arranged in three groups around three glabrous carpels. Flowering occurs from November to December.

== Taxonomy ==
Hibbertia kaputarensis was first formally described in 1990 by Barry Conn in the journal Muelleria from specimens collected near the entrance to Mount Kaputar National Park in 1976.

== Distribution and habitat ==
This hibbertia is common in heath and woodland, growing in rocky soils in the Mount Kaputar area.
