= Mount Lindesay =

Mount Lindesay may refer to:

- Mount Lindesay (New South Wales), a mountain within the Nandewar Range east of Narrabri in northern New South Wales, Australia
- Mount Lindesay (Queensland), a mountain within the McPherson Range, approximately 200 km south of Brisbane, Australia
- Mount Lindesay National Park, a national park in Western Australia
- Mount Lindesay, Western Australia, a locality of the Shire of Denmark
