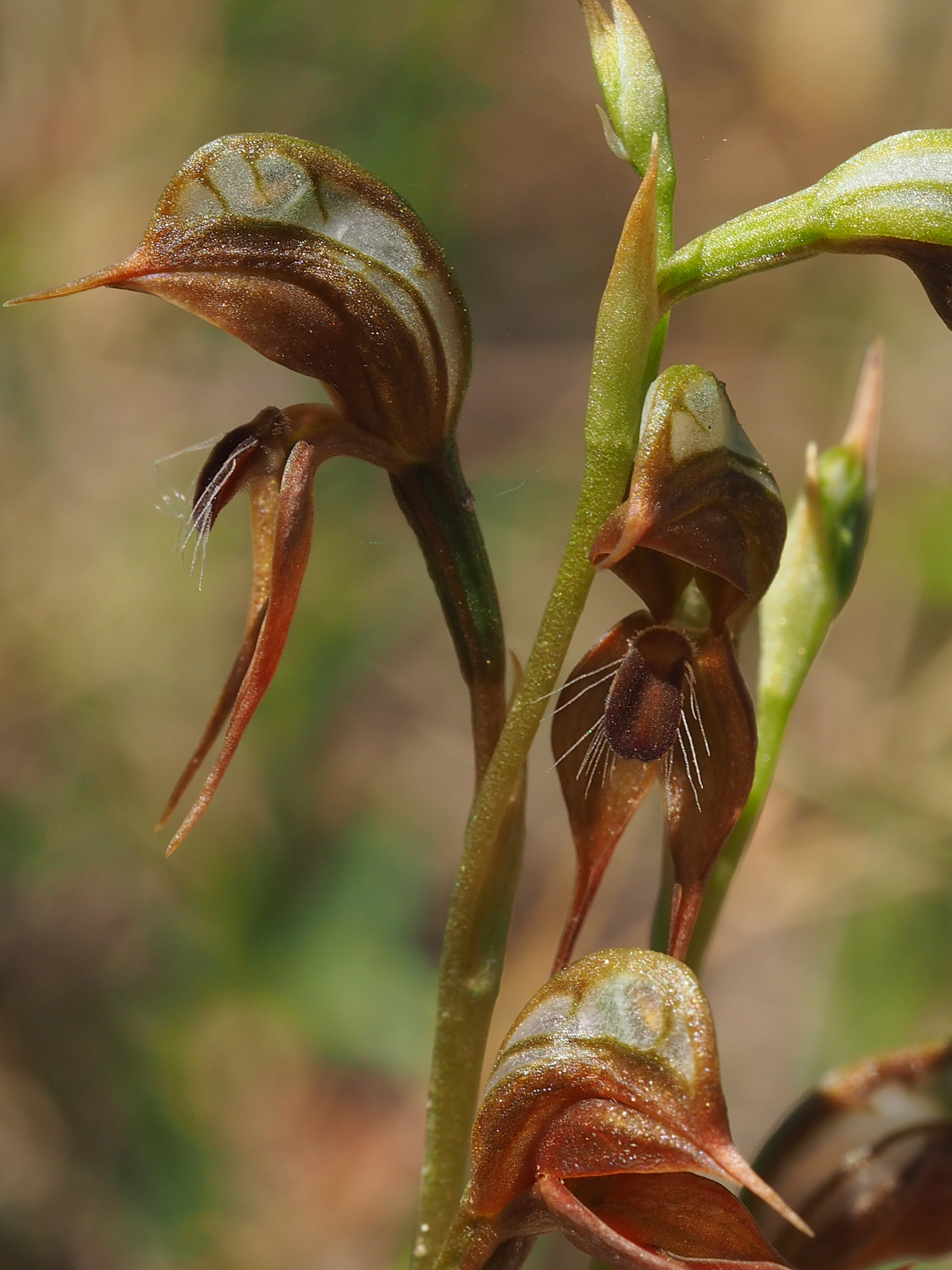
- In Mount Kaputar National Park

Conservation status
- Least Concern (IUCN 3.1)

Scientific classification
- Kingdom: Plantae
- Clade: Embryophytes
- Clade: Tracheophytes
- Clade: Spermatophytes
- Clade: Angiosperms
- Clade: Monocots
- Order: Asparagales
- Family: Orchidaceae
- Subfamily: Orchidoideae
- Tribe: Cranichideae
- Genus: Pterostylis
- Species: P. praetermissa

Binomial name
- Pterostylis praetermissa D.L.Jones & M.A.Clem.

Synonyms
- Oligochaetochilus praetermissa Szlach. orth. var.; Oligochaetochilus praetermissus (M.A.Clem. & D.L.Jones) Szlach.; Pterostylis praetermissa D.L.Jones, nom. inval.

= Pterostylis praetermissa =

Mount Kaputar rustyhood

Species of orchid

Pterostylis praetermissa, commonly known as Mount Kaputar rustyhood is a plant in the orchid family Orchidaceae and is endemic to New South Wales. It has a rosette of leaves and up to nine relatively small greenish and reddish-brown flowers with transparent "windows" and a reddish-brown, insect-like labellum.

== Description ==
Pterostylis praetermissa is a terrestrial, perennial, deciduous, herb with an underground tuber. It has a rosette of between five and eight leaves, each leaf 20–35 mm (0.8–1 in) long and 8–17 mm (0.3–0.7 in) wide. Flowering plants have a rosette at the base and up to eight greenish and reddish-brown flowers with transparent panels and which are 20–25 mm (0.8–1 in) long and 4–5 mm (0.16–0.20 in) wide on a flowering stem 150–250 mm (6–10 in) tall. There are between two and five stem leaves with their bases loosely wrapped around the flowering stem. The dorsal sepal and petals form a hood called the "galea" over the column with the dorsal sepal having a narrow point 2–3 mm (0.08–0.1 in) long. The lateral sepals turn downwards, about the same width as the galea and have thread-like tips 5–6 mm (0.20–0.24 in) long. The labellum is almost flat, reddish-brown, fleshy and insect-like, about 5 mm (0.2 in) long and 2 mm (0.08 in) wide. The "head" end has many short hairs and there are between twelve and fifteen longer hairs on each side of the body. Flowering occurs from September to October.

== Taxonomy and naming ==
Pterostylis praetermissa was first described in 1988 by David Jones in his book, Native Orchids of Australia, citing the authors as himself and Mark Clements, but the name was not validly published, as the description was given in English and no type was indicated. In 1989 by David Jones and Mark Clements published a valid description of the species from a specimen collected from forests near Mount Kaputar National Park by Ronald George Tunstall (1950 - 2005) in the journal Australian Orchid Research. The specific epithet (praetermissa) means 'omitted' or 'neglected'.

== Distribution and habitat ==
Mount Kaputar rustyhood occurs in isolated populations on forest slopes and rocky ridges between Mount Kaputar and Barrington Tops.
