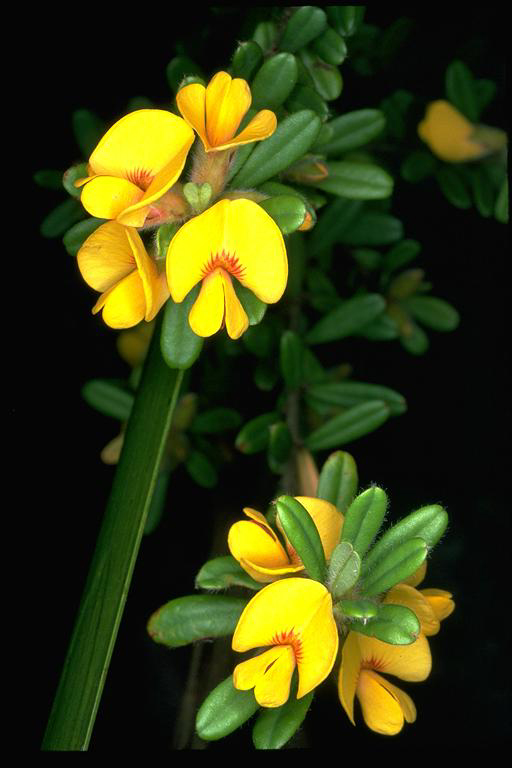
- In the Gibraltar Range National Park

Scientific classification
- Kingdom: Plantae
- Clade: Tracheophytes
- Clade: Angiosperms
- Clade: Eudicots
- Clade: Rosids
- Order: Fabales
- Family: Fabaceae
- Subfamily: Faboideae
- Genus: Pultenaea
- Species: P. cuneata

Binomial name
- Pultenaea cuneata Benth.

Synonyms
- Pultenaea kennyi H.B.Will.; Pultenaea microphylla var. cuneata (Benth.) Benth.; Pultenaea sp. 'G'

= Pultenaea cuneata =

Species of flowering plant

Pultenaea cuneata is a species of flowering plant in the family Fabaceae and is endemic to eastern Australia. It is an erect shrub with triangular to egg-shaped leaves with the narrower end towards the base, and groups of yellow to orange and red to purple flowers.

== Description ==
Pultenaea cuneata is an erect shrub with hairy branchlets that typically grows to a height of 0.5–2 m (1 ft 8 in – 6 ft 7 in). The leaves are triangular to egg-shaped with the narrower end towards the base, 5–10 mm (0.20–0.39 in) long and 0.8–1.2 mm (0.031–0.047 in) wide with stipules 1.6–2.3 mm (0.063–0.091 in) long at the base and with the edges curved downwards. The flowers are arranged near the ends of the branchlets or on short side-shoots and are 7–10 mm (0.28–0.39 in) long on a pedicel 1.0–1.5 mm (0.039–0.059 in) long with hairy, linear bracteoles 4.5–6 mm (0.18–0.24 in) long attached to the sepal tube. The sepals are 3–5.2 mm (0.12–0.20 in) long and the standard petal is yellow to orange, 8.3–8.5 mm (0.33–0.33 in) long, the wings yellow to orange 4.5–7 mm (0.18–0.28 in) long and the keel red to purple. Flowering occurs from July to October and the fruit is an elliptic to egg-shaped pod 6.5–9 mm (0.26–0.35 in) long.

== Taxonomy and naming ==
Pultenaea cuneata was first formally described in 1837 by George Bentham in the Commentationes de Leguminosarum Generibus. The specific epithet (cuneata) means "wedge-shaped".

== Distribution and habitat ==
This pultenaea is an understorey shrub in woodland and forest in the Moreton and Darling Downs districts in Queensland and from the Liverpool Range to the Nandewar Range in New South Wales.
