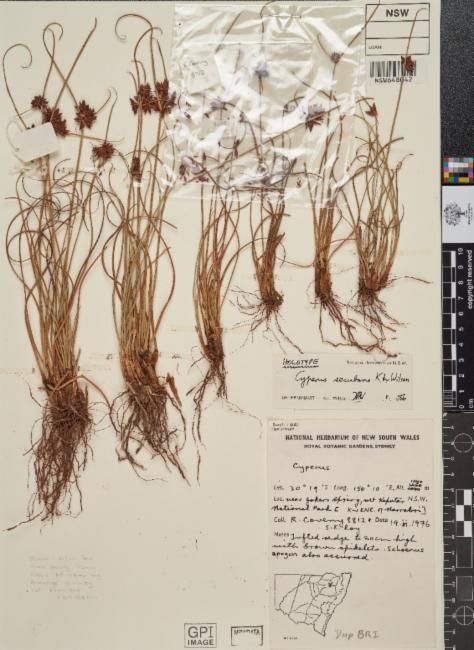
- Holotype NSW648042

Scientific classification
- Kingdom: Plantae
- Clade: Tracheophytes
- Clade: Angiosperms
- Clade: Monocots
- Clade: Commelinids
- Order: Poales
- Family: Cyperaceae
- Genus: Cyperus
- Species: C. secubans

Binomial name
- Cyperus secubans K.L.Wilson, 1991
- Holotype site: near Jokers Spring'"`UNIQ--ref-00000004-QINU`"'

= Cyperus secubans =

Species of sedge

Cyperus secubans is a species of sedge that is native to parts of eastern Australia. This sedge was first described in 1991 by Karen Louise Wilson. The epithet, secubans, derives from secubare (Latin), and refers to the species' physical isolation from others in the section Pinnati.

It is found on the Nandewar Range on rocky outcrops in rocky crevices.

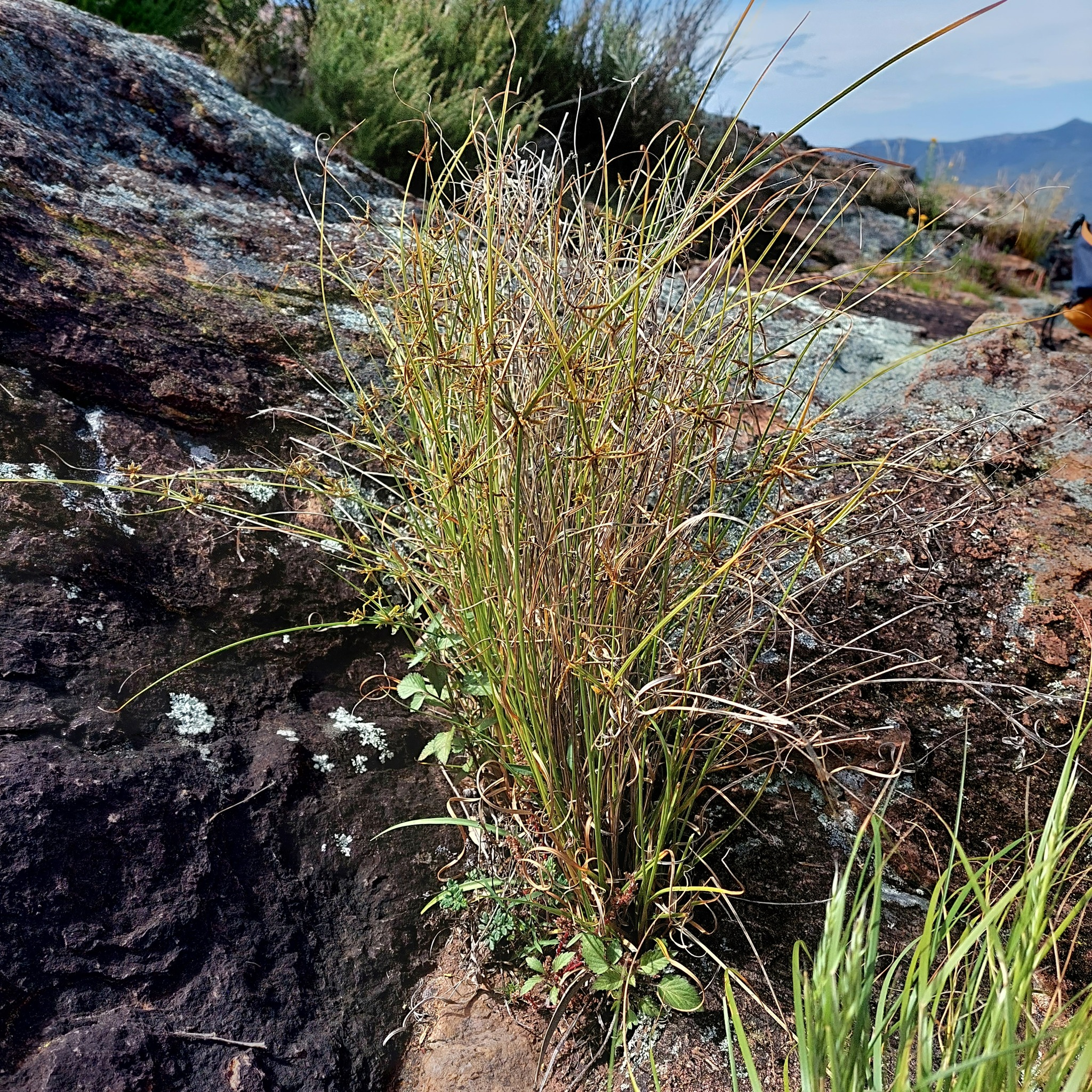
Cyperus secubans on Nandewar Range

== See also ==
- List of Cyperus species
