= Horton River =

Horton River may refer to:

In Australia

- Horton River (New South Wales), in northern New South Wales
- Horton River (Tasmania), in northwestern Tasmania

In Canada

- Horton River (Canada), a tributary of the Beaufort Sea

== See also ==
- Horton (disambiguation)
