= Patrick Lindesay =

Australian politician (1778–1839)

Major-General Sir Patrick Lindesay KCB KCH
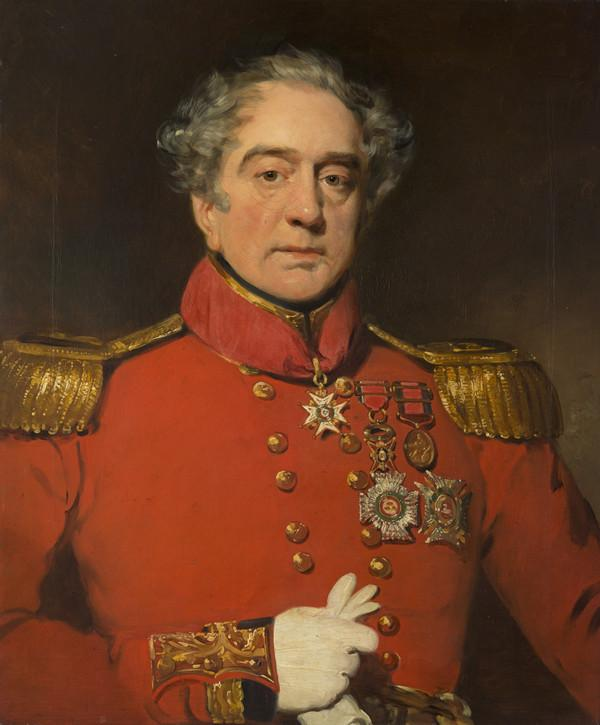
- Born: 24 February 1778; Musselburgh, East Lothian, Scotland
- Died: 14 March 1839 (aged 61)
- Burial place: St Michael's Churchyard, Inveresk
- Alma mater: Edinburgh University
- Relatives: John Lindesay
- Military career
- Allegiance: Scottish
- Branch: Army
- Rank: Major-General
- Unit: 78th (Highlanders) Regiment of Foot
- Commands: Garrison at Port Jackson
- Conflicts: Napoleonic Wars
- Awards: Companion of the Order of the Bath
- Other work: Acting Governor of New South Wales

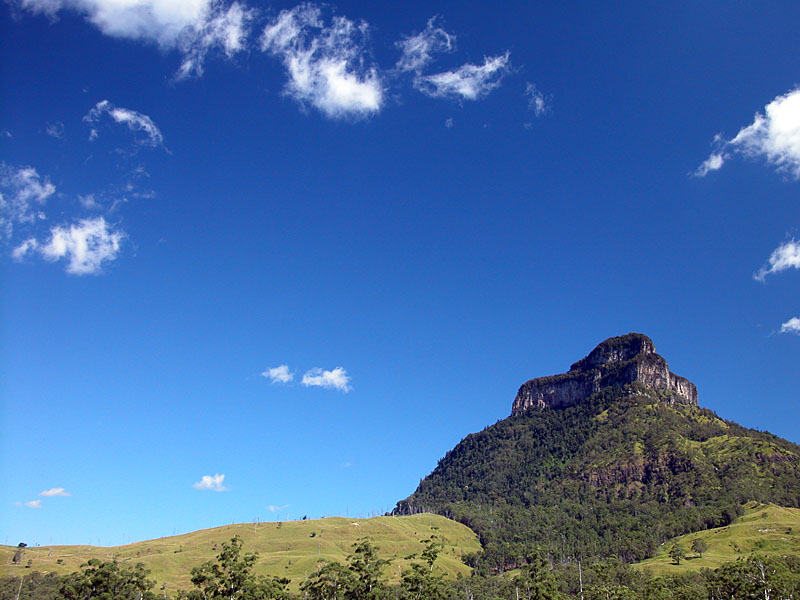
Mount Lindesay (Queensland) from the Mount Lindesay Highway

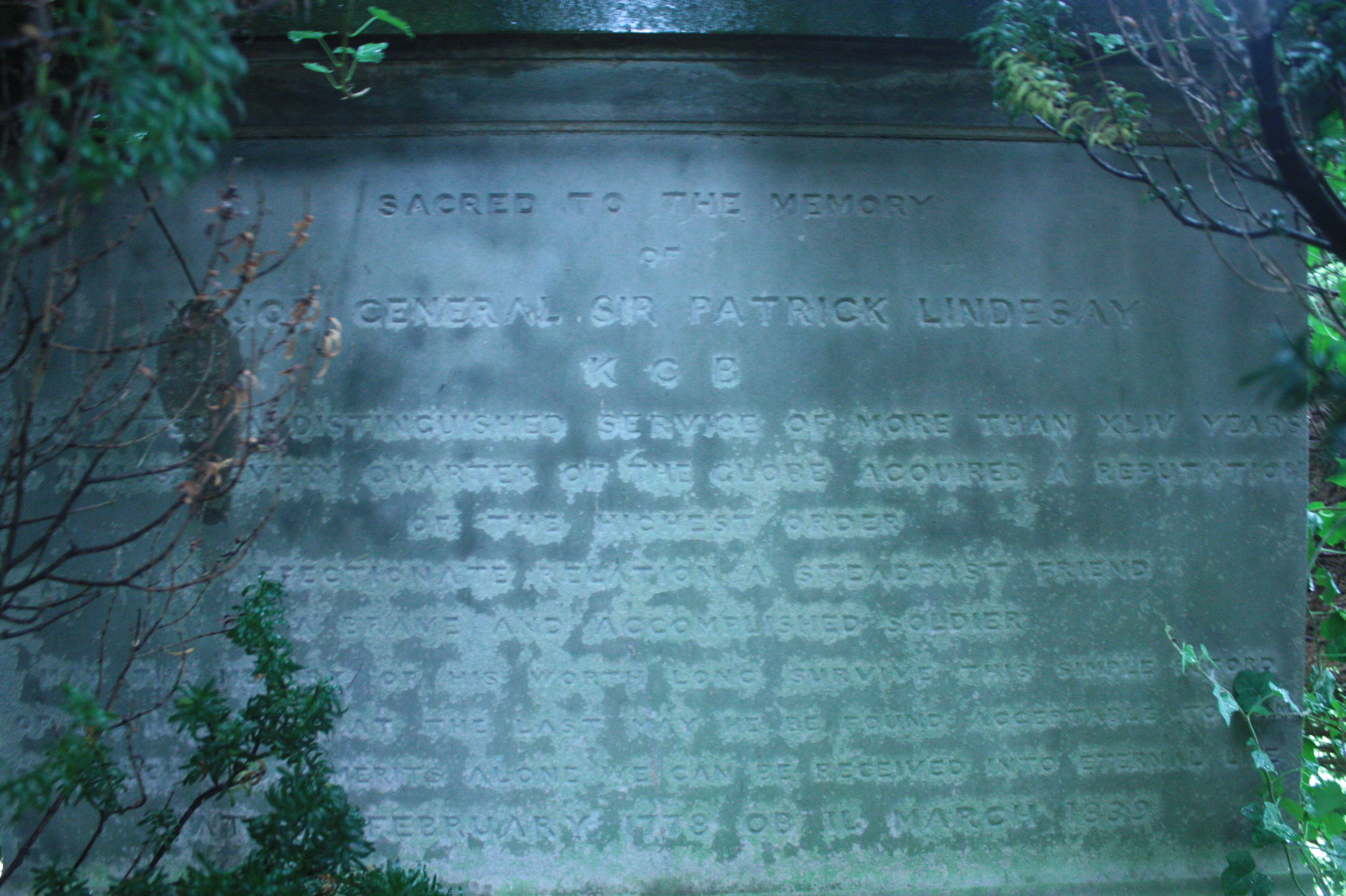
The highly obscured grave of Sir Patrick Lindesay, Inveresk

Sir Patrick Lindesay, KCB, KCH (24 February 1778 – 14 March 1839) was a Scottish officer in the British Army during the Napoleonic Wars and Peninsular War but is most noted as having served as acting governor of New South Wales, Australia in 1831. Mount Lindesay (Queensland), Mount Lindesay (New South Wales), and Lindesay River in Australia are all named after him.

== Life ==
He was born in Musselburgh, East Lothian, Scotland, the son of Lt. Col. John Lindesay.

He was educated at Edinburgh University and in 1793 joined the army as an ensign. He was thereafter gazetted as a lieutenant in the famed 78th (Highlanders) Regiment of Foot. He was promoted to captain in September 1795. He moved to the 39th (Dorsetshire) Regiment of Foot in October 1796 and was there promoted to major in 1807. He then saw considerable action in Spain and Portugal during the Peninsular War.

In 1811 he saw his most major action and received a medal for his actions in the Battle of Albuera.

In 1814, his obituary states, he had a "final brush" with the Americans in the final battles between these countries.

From 1824 to 1826 he served in the First Anglo-Burmese War, commanding a division of the Expeditionary Army.

== Australia ==
In November 1827, aged 49, he arrived in Sydney, Australia to succeed Colonel William Stewart (governor) in the command of the garrison at Port Jackson. He became a member of the New South Wales Legislative Council in 1827, and when the post of lieutenant-governor was abolished he took over the required duties of the post. From April 1829 he was a member of the executive council. After the controversial departure of the governor Sir Ralph Darling on 22 October 1831, Lindesay filled the role of Acting Governor until the appointment of Sir Richard Bourke as governor on 2 December 1831.

During this period he permitted one of the captains in his regiment, Captain Charles Sturt to take a leave of absence to explore the Murray River. On Sturt's return, he brought many bird skins, which were then delivered by Lindesay to the Edinburgh Museum. A later donation to Prof. Robert Jameson caused Jameson to state that Lindesay was "a distinguished officer and a very active naturalist".

Sturt later named a tributary of the Murray River the Lindesay River, in gratitude to his commanding officer.

The explorer Allan Cunningham later named a mountain on the border of New South Wales, in the McPherson Range, "Mount Lindesay" but this was later (c.1840) renamed Mount Barney. The name Mount Lindesay was then used to replace a mountain previously named "Mount Hooker" just north within Queensland. A second Mount Lindesay (New South Wales) was later named by Sir Thomas Mitchell, attaching to a dominant mountain in the Nandewar Range.

== Late life ==
In 1832 he was dispatched to India to command the garrisons at Bangalore. After the surrender of Mercara, he received a bounty of £10,000. He then commanded the entire British forces in southern Madras until late 1835.

He returned to Britain in 1836 and was appointed a Companion of the Order of the Bath and Military Knight Commander of the Royal Hanoverian Guelphic Order. He was promoted to the rank of major general on 10 January 1837.

He is interred in St. Michael's Churchyard in Inveresk west of the main church in the older section. His grave in 2014 was wholly obscured by two yew trees.
