= Horton River (New South Wales) =

River in New South Wales, Australia

Coordinates: 29°45′S 150°25′E

Horton
- Etymology: In honour of Robert Wilmot Horton

Location
- Country: Australia
- State: New South Wales
- Region: Northern Tablelands (IBRA), New England, North West Slopes
- Municipalities: Gwydir, Moree Plains

Physical characteristics
- Source: Nandewar Range
  - location: below Mount Kaputar
  - elevation: 1,330 m (4,360 ft)
- Mouth: confluence with the Gwydir River
  - location: between Bingara and Gravesend
  - elevation: 270 m (890 ft)
- Length: 134 km (83 mi)

Basin features
- River system: Barwon River, Murray–Darling basin

The Horton River, a perennial stream of the Barwon catchment within the Murray–Darling basin, is located in the Northern Tablelands and North West Slopes districts of New South Wales, Australia.

== Course and features ==
The river rises on the northern slopes of the Nandewar Range, below Mount Kaputar, and flows generally southeast and north, joined by six tributaries before reaching its confluence with the Gwydir River, north west of Bingara, descending 1,060 metres (3,480 ft) over its 134 kilometres (83 mi) course.

The valley of the Horton River is used for grazing and some cropping. It is a sparsely populated area with no significant towns. There is a small village called Upper Horton. The valley is traversed by the Narrabri-Bingara Road. Other nearby towns, outside the valley, are Barraba, Bingara, and Narrabri.

The Horton River is a source of floodwater for the Gwydir River and Mehi River and can flood the town Moree.

== See also ==
- Rivers of New South Wales
- List of rivers of Australia
