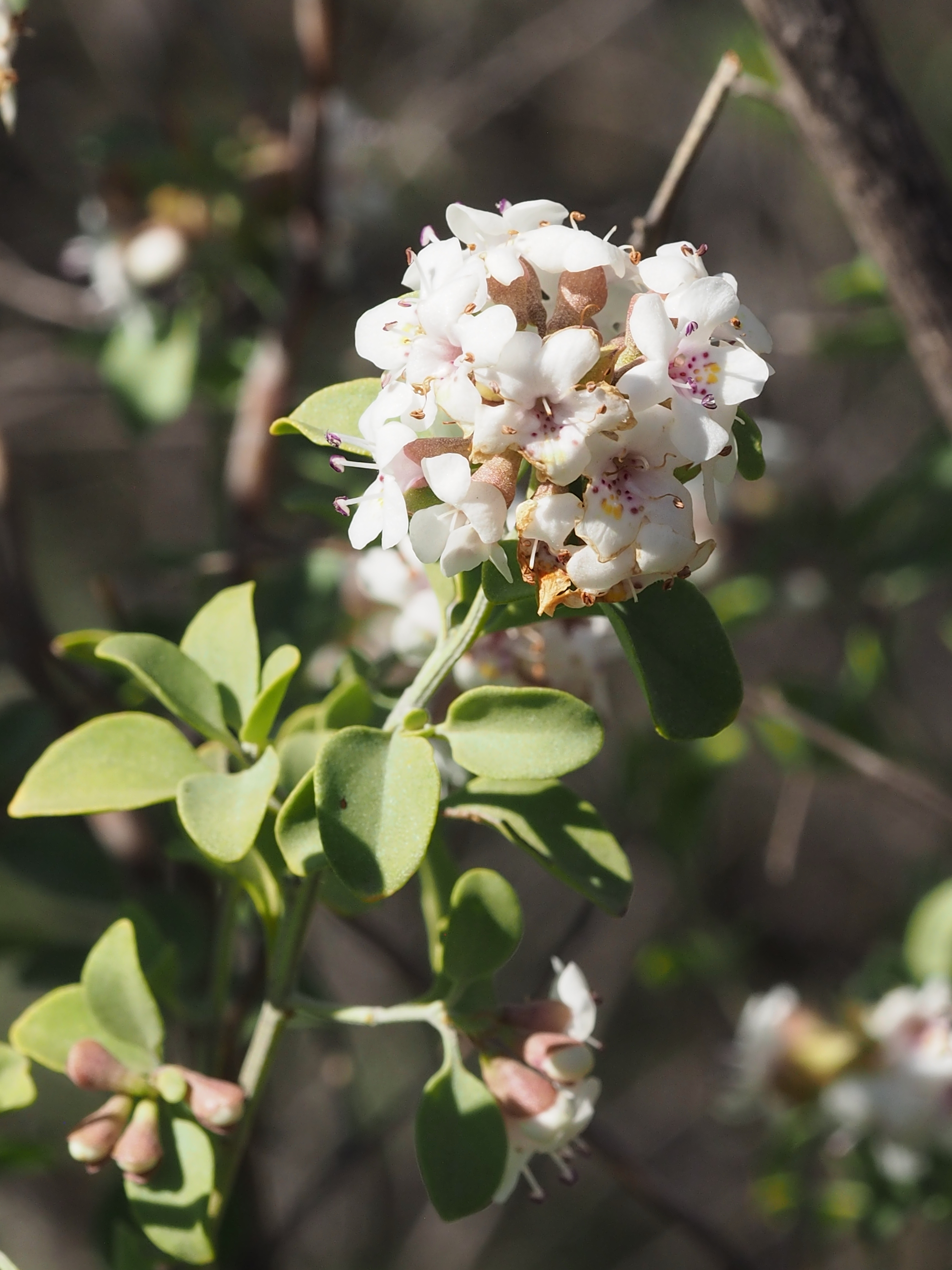

Scientific classification
- Kingdom: Plantae
- Clade: Tracheophytes
- Clade: Angiosperms
- Clade: Eudicots
- Clade: Asterids
- Order: Lamiales
- Family: Lamiaceae
- Genus: Prostanthera
- Species: P. cruciflora

Binomial name
- Prostanthera cruciflora J.H.Willis
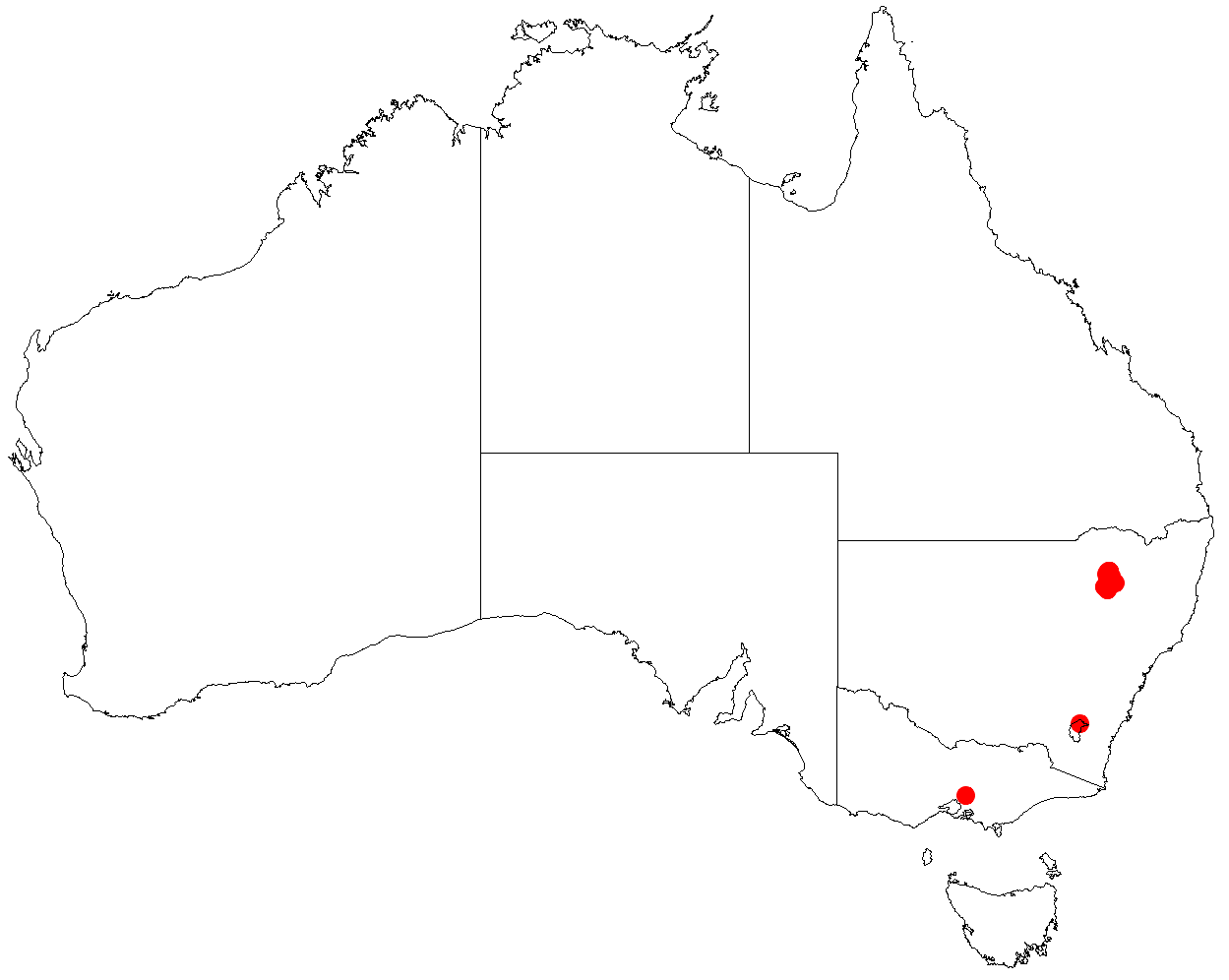
- Occurrence data from AVH

= Prostanthera cruciflora =

Species of flowering plant

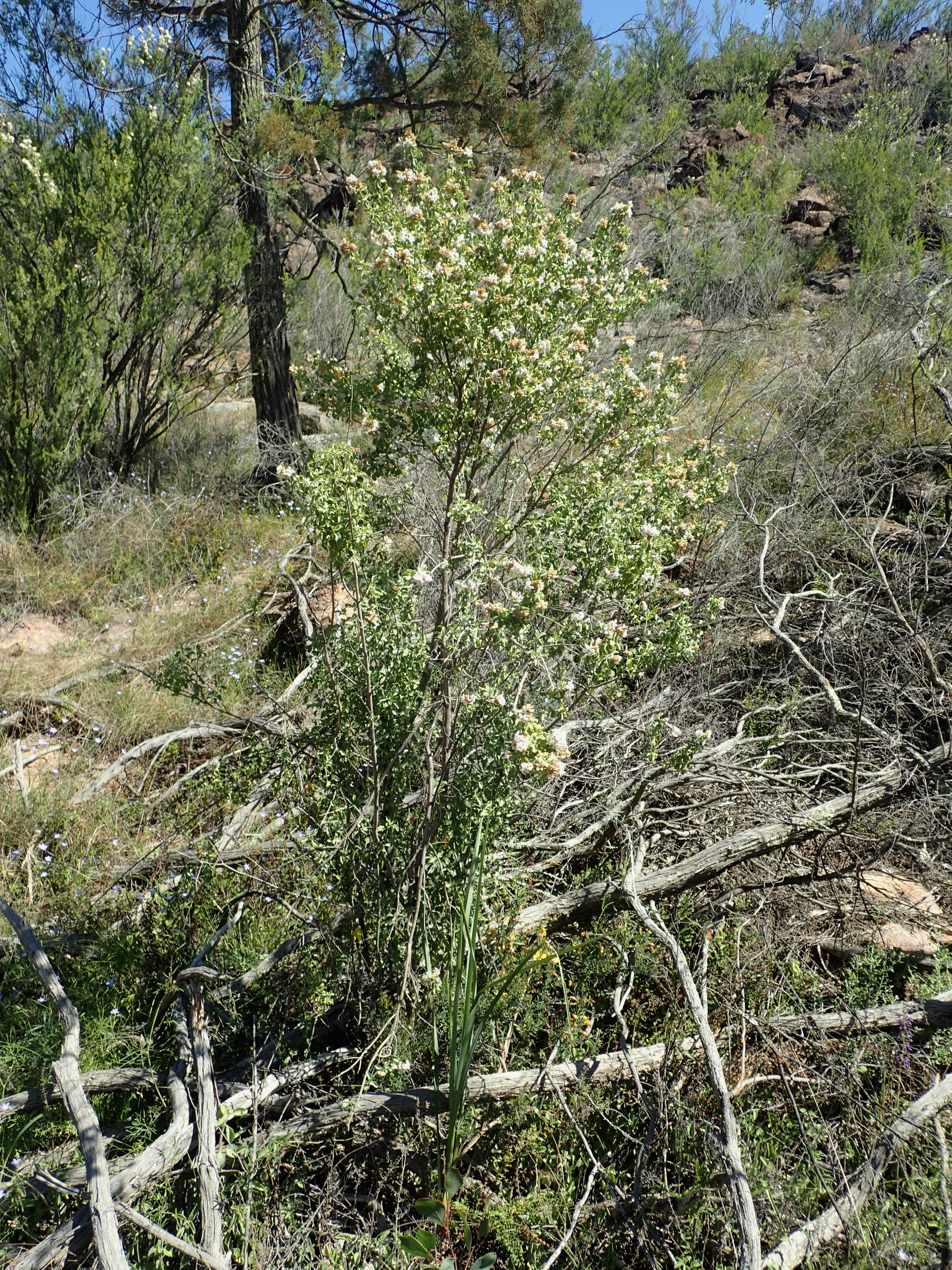
Habit in the Mount Kaputar National Park

Prostanthera cruciflora is a species of flowering plant that is endemic to New South Wales. It is an erect, strongly aromatic shrub with egg-shaped leaves and white flowers with yellow streaks arranged in groups on the ends of branchlets.

== Description ==
Prostanthera cruciflora is an erect, strongly aromatic shrub that typically grows to a height of 1.5–2 m (4 ft 11 in – 6 ft 7 in) with branchlets densely covered with glands. Its leaves are greyish green, egg-shaped, 6–20 mm (0.24–0.79 in) long and 8–15 mm (0.31–0.59 in) wide on a petiole 3–10 mm (0.12–0.39 in) long, and densely glandular. The flowers are arranged in groups of about eight, the sepals about 8 mm (0.31 in) long, forming a tube about 3.5 mm (0.14 in) long with two lobes, the upper lobe about 2.5 mm (0.098 in) long. The petals are 6–9 mm (0.24–0.35 in) long and white with yellow streaks on the lower lobe. Flowering occurs from August to December.

== Taxonomy and naming ==
Prostanthera cruciflora was first formally described in 1967 by James Hamlyn Willis in the journal Muelleria. The specific epithet (cruciflora) is "an allusion to the cross-shaped lower lip of the corolla".

== Distribution and habitat ==
This mint bush grows in heath on exposed rock outcrops in the Mount Kaputar National Park and on nearby ranges.
