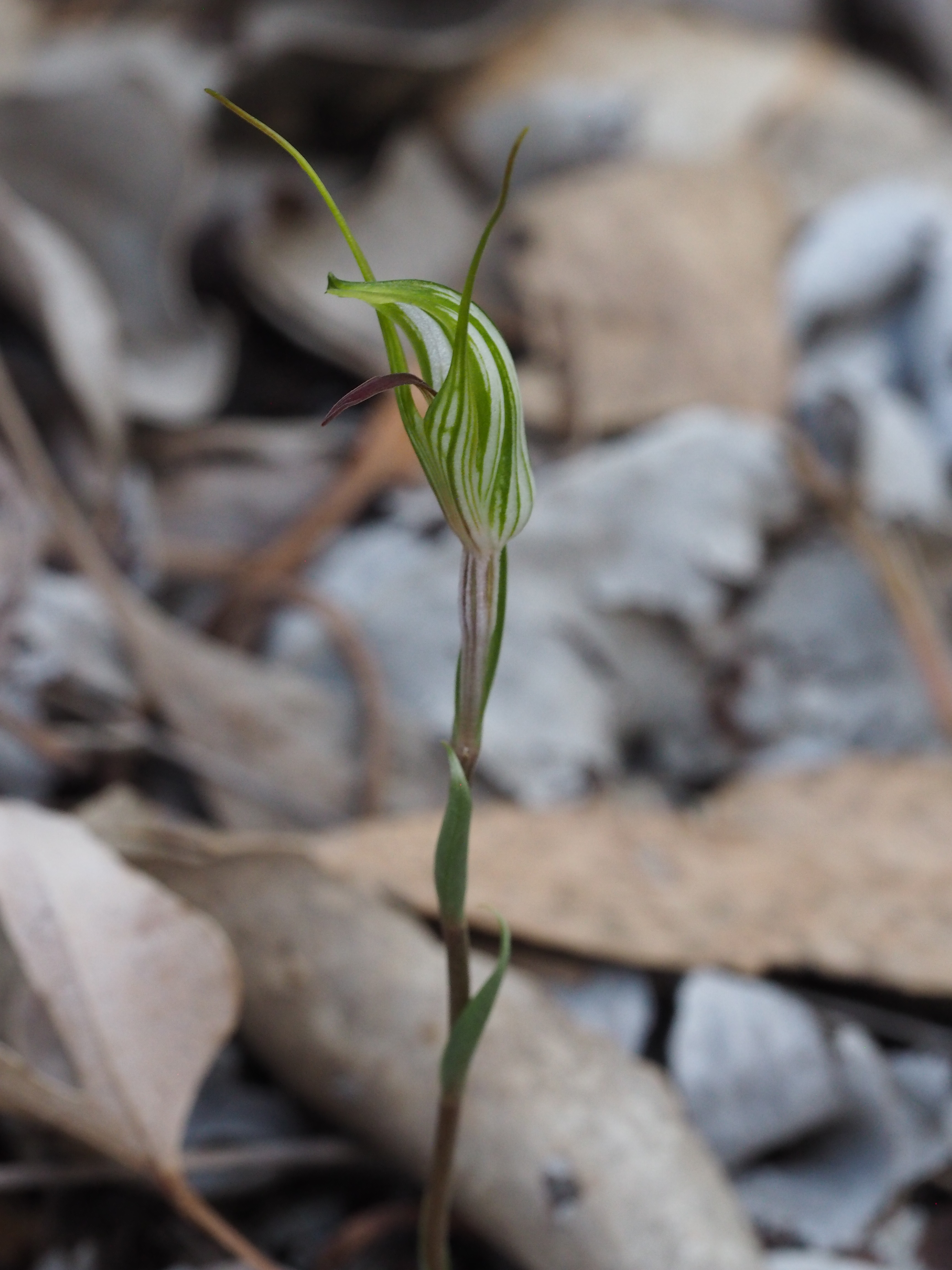
- In the Warrumbungles National Park

Scientific classification
- Kingdom: Plantae
- Clade: Embryophytes
- Clade: Tracheophytes
- Clade: Spermatophytes
- Clade: Angiosperms
- Clade: Monocots
- Order: Asparagales
- Family: Orchidaceae
- Subfamily: Orchidoideae
- Tribe: Cranichideae
- Genus: Pterostylis
- Species: P. longicurva

Binomial name
- Pterostylis longicurva Rupp

Synonyms
- Diplodium longicurvum (Rupp) D.L.Jones & M.A.Clem.

= Pterostylis longicurva =

Long-tongued greenhood

Species of orchid

Pterostylis longicurva, commonly known as the long-tongued greenhood, is a species of orchid endemic to eastern Australia. As with similar greenhoods, plants in flower differ from those that are not. Those not in flower have a rosette of leaves lying flat on the ground, but plants in flower have a single flower with leaves on the flowering stem. This species has a white and green flower with brown markings and a long, curved, brown labellum.

== Description ==
Pterostylis longicurva is a terrestrial, perennial, deciduous, herb with an underground tuber and when not in flower, a rosette of between three and seven dark green, egg-shaped leaves lying flat on the ground. Each leaf is 10–25 mm (0.4–1 in) long and 5–15 mm (0.2–0.6 in) wide. Plants in flower have a single flower 16–22 mm (0.6–0.9 in) long and 6–7 mm (0.2–0.3 in) wide, which leans slightly forwards on a flowering stem 60–180 mm (2–7 in) high with between three and five stem leaves. The flowers are white with bold green stripes and brown markings. The dorsal sepal and petals are fused, forming a hood or "galea" over the column, the dorsal sepal with a short point. The lateral sepals are in loose contact with the galea, erect or backswept, have thread-like tips 12–16 mm (0.5–0.6 in) long and a curved V-shaped sinus between their bases. The labellum is 15–18 mm (0.6–0.7 in) long, about 2 mm (0.08 in) wide, brown, curved and protrudes prominently above the sinus. Flowering occurs from April to June.

== Taxonomy and naming ==
Pterostylis longicurva was first formally described in 1941 by Herman Rupp from a specimen collected near Upper Horton. The description was published in Contributions from the New South Wales National Herbarium. The specific epithet (longicurva) is derived from the Latin words longus meaning "long" and curvus meaning "bent".

== Distribution and habitat ==
The long-tongued greenhood grows on shady slopes in forest from Coonabarabran in New South Wales to south-east Queensland.
