= Mount Dowe =

Mountain in New South Wales, Australia

- Location within New South Wales

Highest point
- Elevation: 1,457 m (4,780 ft)
- Coordinates: 30°17′S 150°10′E

Geography
- Location: New South Wales, Australia
- Parent range: Nandewar Range

Mount Dowe is a mountain in the North West Slopes region of New South Wales, Australia. It is part of an old shield volcano that was active around 18 million years ago. With an elevation of 1,457 metres (4,780 ft) above sea level, Mount Dowe is the second highest mountain in the Nandewar Range, only being just short of Mount Kaputar, at 1,508 metres (4,948 ft) above sea level.

On the mountain peak are television and radio transmitters which broadcast to locations such as Moree, Tamworth, Gunnedah and Narrabri as it provides a prime location to give television coverage to vast areas in the North West Slopes and Plains region.

The summit of Mount Dowe is often 10 °C (18 °F) colder than the valley floor. Mount Dowe can also receive snow during winter but usually this is only a light dusting.

== See also ==
- List of mountains of Australia § New South Wales
