= Kurrawonga Falls =

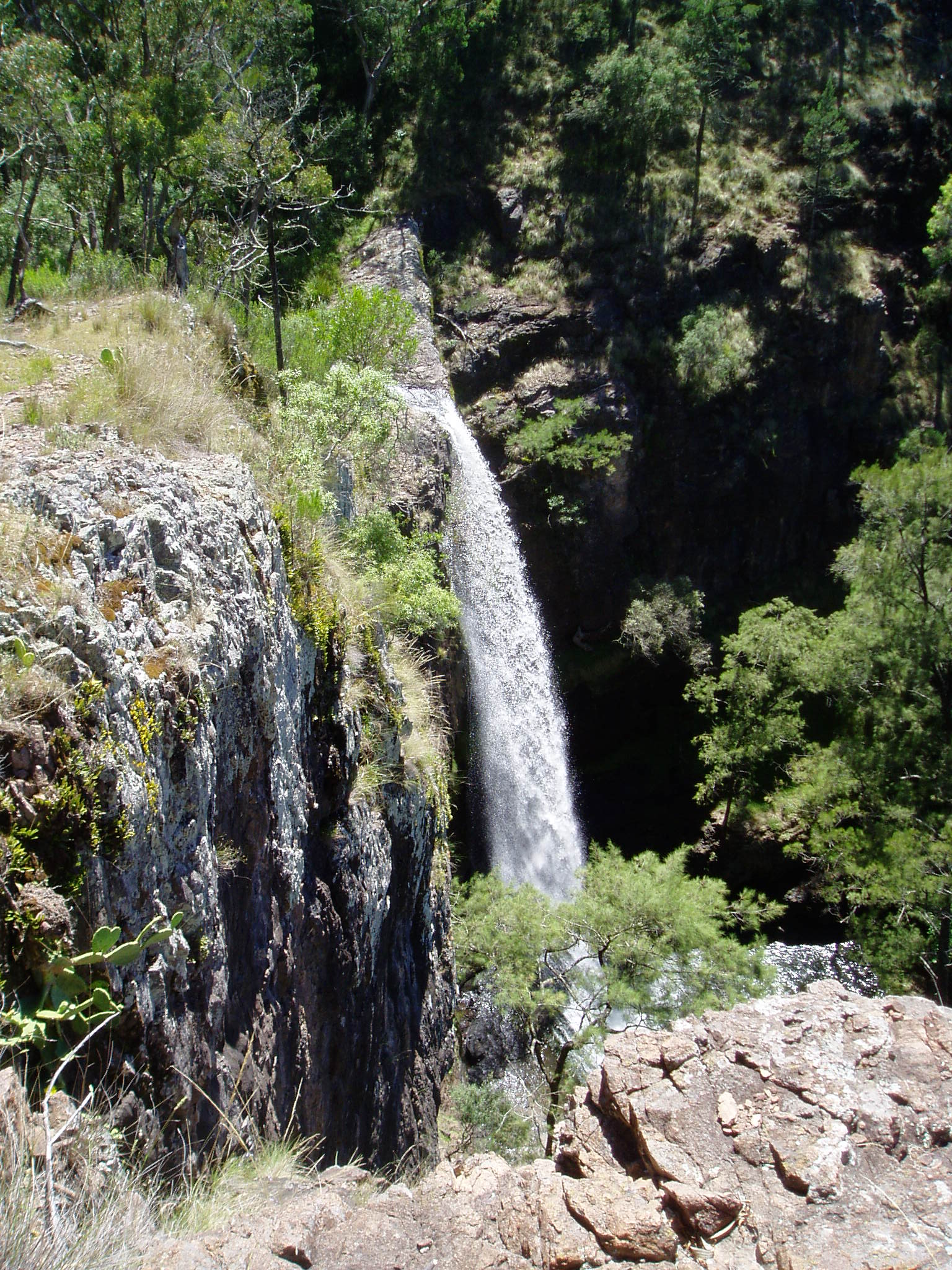
Kurrawonga Falls

Kurrawonga Falls is a waterfall located in the Mount Kaputar National Park, approximately 52 km (32 mi) east of the town of Narrabri in northern New South Wales, Australia.

== Geography ==
The falls are a permanent feature of the Horsearm Creek. The creek flows through dense native bushland across the Kaputa Plateau and into a steep chasm in the surrounding rocks, falling over 30 metres (98 ft) into a sinkhole beneath. The volume of the falls varies with seasonal rainfall.

=== Access ===
The falls, along with the historic Scutts Hutt, are accessible via a return hike of approximately 20 km (12 mi) along the Scutts Hutt Firetrail from Kaputar Road, a public road, and the nearby Bark Hut camping grounds. Branching from the trail is a 1.7 km (1.1 mi) track to the hut which is sign-posted, but the last 450 metres (1,480 ft) leading down to the falls is not. The trail is categorised as 'Grade 5' (very steep, difficult, rough, obstacles) with an elevation gain of 806 metres (2,644 ft) and is recommended for experienced bushwalkers only. Average journey time is 10–12 hours, and mobile phone coverage is extremely limited.

== 2020 bushfires ==
In January–February 2020 the bushfires that ravaged eastern Australia swept through the national park, forcing its temporary closure, and access to the falls and other attractions were closed to the public.
