= Mount Lindesay (New South Wales) =

Mountain in New South Wales, Australia

- Mount Lindsay
- Location within New South Wales

Highest point
- Elevation: 1,373 m (4,505 ft)
- Coordinates: 30°11′27″S 150°08′45″E

Geography
- Location: New South Wales, Australia
- Parent range: Nandewar Range
- Topo map: Coryah

Geology
- Mountain type: Extinct volcano

Climbing
- Easiest route: Walk (hike)

Mount Lindesay, sometimes incorrectly recorded as Mount Lindsay, a mountain located within the Nandewar Range, is situated within the North West Slopes region of New South Wales, Australia. The mountain was formed by the Nandewar extinct volcano, which ceased activity about 17 million years ago after 4 million years of activity.

The mountain has an elevation of 1,373 metres (4,505 ft) above sea level and lies within the Mount Kaputar National Park, east of Narrabri and west of Barraba.

The mountain was named by Sir Thomas Mitchell after Colonel (later Major General) Patrick Lindesay, a Scot commanding the military forces of New South Wales and who was the Acting Governor in 1831.

== See also ==
- List of mountains of Australia § New South Wales
