= Mount Kaputar =

Mountain in New South Wales, Australia

- Location within New South Wales

Highest point
- Elevation: 1,489 m (4,885 ft)
- Coordinates: 30°16′26″S 150°09′25″E

Geography
- Location: New South Wales, Australia
- Parent range: Nandewar Range

Geology
- Rock age(s): Between 17 and 21 million years ago

Climbing
- Easiest route: Drive

Mount Kaputar, a mountain with an elevation of 1,489 metres (4,885 ft) above sea level, is located near Narrabri in northern New South Wales. It is part of the Nandewar Range and has been preserved within the Mount Kaputar National Park. The mountain is a prominent landmark for travellers on the Newell Highway as it rises abruptly from the plains. In the cold of winter the mountain may receive a light dusting of snow.

== Access ==
The summit is accessible from Narrabri via a 57-kilometre (35 mi) long, winding and narrow road that is partly sealed. Neighboring Mount Dowe, with an elevation of 1,457 metres (4,780 ft) above sea level, contains various telecommunications broadcasting equipment and the large antenna is visible from the Kamilaroi Highway heading south towards Gunnedah.

There is a lookout at the top of the peak called Mount Kaputar Lookout. Nearby is the Governor Lookout and Eckfords Lookout as well as Dawson Spring with cabins, picnic tables and camping facilities.

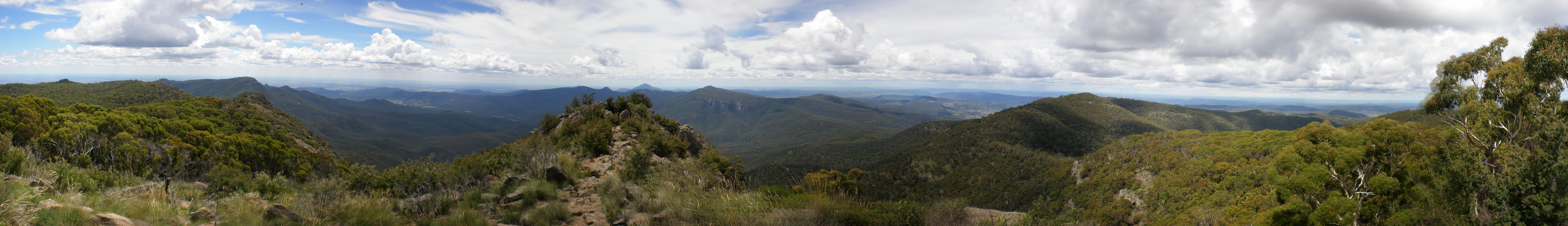
Mount Kaputar panoramic view from the summit viewing platform

== Geology ==
Mount Kaputar is the remnants of an extinct volcano that was active about 18 million years ago. Mount Lindesay was probably the centre of the volcano. The predominant vegetation on the mountain is dry sclerophyll forest.

== Flora ==
The main vegetation types are dry rainforests, dry eucalypt forests and heathlands. A sub-alpine zone known as the Kaputar Plateau forms an elevated area 1,350 metres (4,430 ft) above sea level. Here the main vegetation type is open eucalypt forest dominated by snow gum, ribbon gum and mountain gum. Below this down to 1,000 metres (3,300 ft) above sea level the most common trees include the silver-top stringybark and rough-barked mountain gum. Heath occurs in scattered patches where exposure to high winds and shallow soils inhibits the growth of larger trees.

== Fauna ==
The mountain is home to a giant, fluorescent pink slug, which can grow up to 20 centimetres (7.9 in) in length. This pink species is found only on this single mountaintop. The peak is an isolated habitat island on which endemic invertebrates and plant species have existed for millions of years. According to a park ranger there are three species of cannibal snails on the mountain.

== See also ==
- List of mountains of Australia § New South Wales
- List of volcanoes in Australia
