= Nandewar Range =

Mountain range in New South Wales, Australia

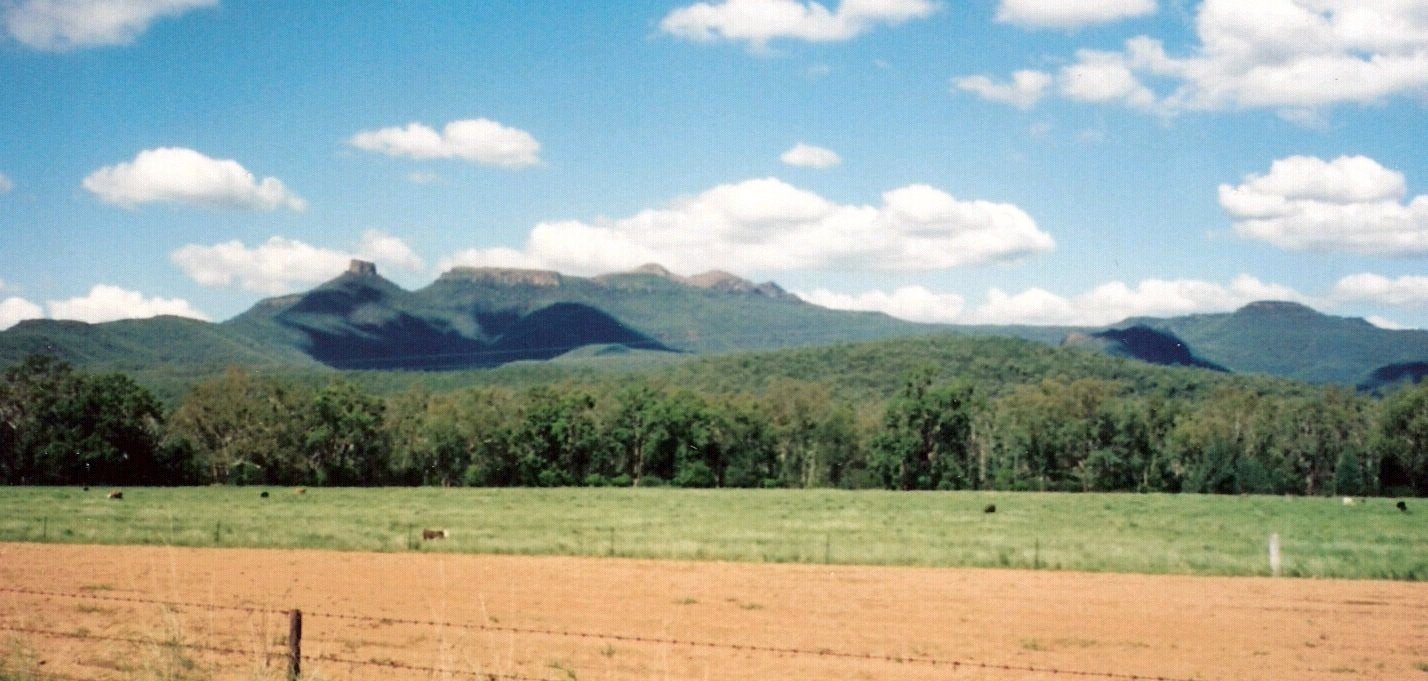
- Mount Kaputar, the third peak from the left, is the range's highest peak.

Highest point
- Peak: Mount Kaputar
- Elevation: 1,508 m (4,948 ft)

Geography
- Location within New South Wales
- Country: Australia
- State: New South Wales
- Range coordinates: 30°30′S 151°00′E

Geology
- Rock age: Cenozoic
- Rock type: Shield volcano

The Nandewar Range, a mountain range that is part of the Great Dividing Range, is located in the North West Slopes region of New South Wales, Australia. The range is situated approximately 30 km (19 mi) east of the township of Narrabri.

John Oxley was the first European to see the range in 1818 as he explored the New South Wales.

== Location and features ==
The range is located on the western, inland, side of the New England region, and generally forms the watershed divide between the Namoi River and Gwydir River catchment basins to the south and north respectively. The Macdonald River starting south of Walcha drains west to Warrabah National Park where it changes its name to the Namoi then is added to by the Manilla River, Peel River and Mooki River. The Horton River runs north to the Gwydir. Both rivers together drain segments of the Nandewar Range.

The eastern part of the Nandewar Range starts at the Great Dividing Range south of Uralla. The main road between Narrabri and Bingara crosses the range. At its western end, the Nandewar Range culminates at Mount Kaputar, a complex of volcanic origin, from which there are views of the flat inland plains of New South Wales.

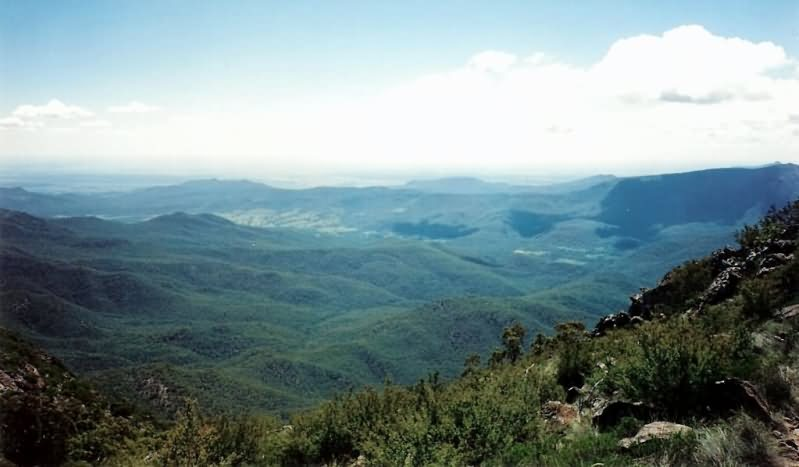
Forests on the north west slopes of Mount Kaputar.

The foothill areas of the Nandewar Range are used for grazing and cropping. There are forests in some of the higher areas. The Mount Kaputar area is included in Mount Kaputar National Park.

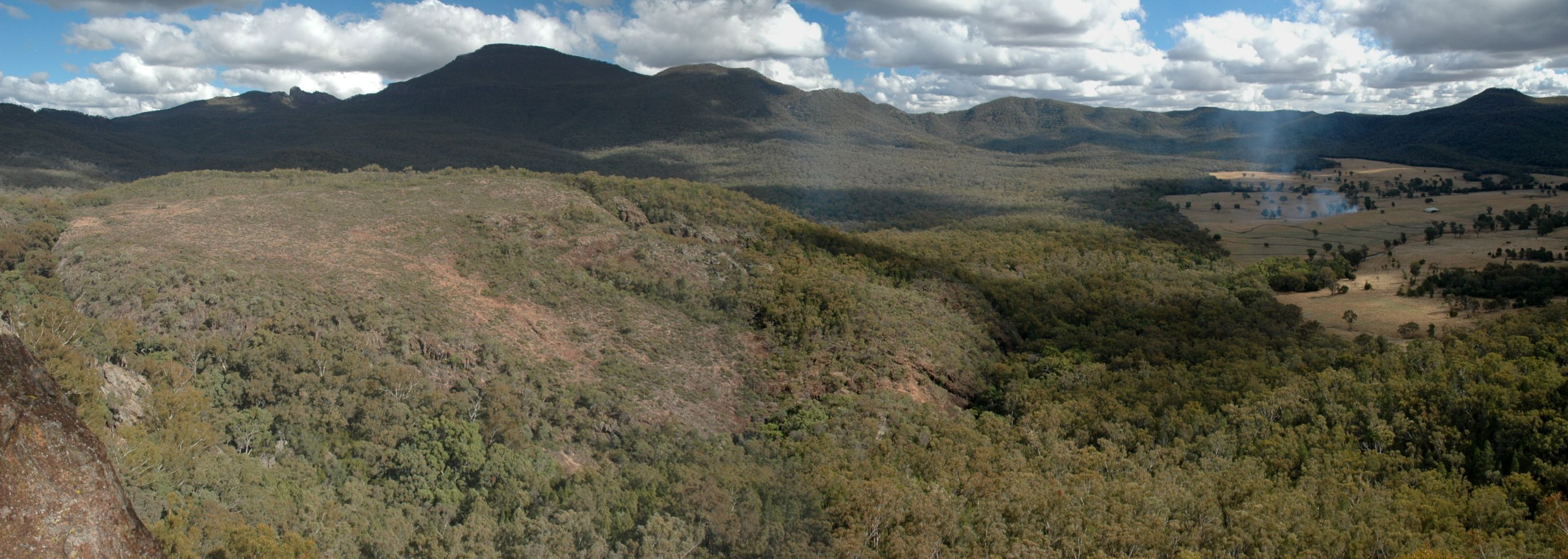
Grattai Mountain rises to 1,301 m (4,268 ft). and is the most northerly peak in the range.

The range is occasionally dusted with light snow in winter.

== Geology ==
The range is the remnants of an eroded basaltic shield volcano that formed about 18 million years ago. Some of the exposed rocks in the area are 230 million years old.

== Etymology ==
The first is a volcanic plug called 'Ninghdoo' (pronounced locally as Ningy-doo) or 'Nungadhun'. The names Nandewar, Kaputar and Ninghdoo are the Gamilaraay language names for these features.

== Peaks ==
Mountains within the Nandewar Range include;

- Bushy Mountain, (1,260 m or 4,134 ft)
- Castletop Mountain
- Gins Mountain
- Grattai Mountain, (1,301 m or 4,268 ft)
- Mount Dowe, (1,457 m or 4,780 ft)
- Mount Kaputar, (1,489 m or 4,885 ft)
- Mount Lawler
- Mount Lindesay, (1,373 m or 4,505 ft)
- Mount Ningadhun, (1,013 m or 3,323 ft)
- Mount Waa
- Mount Yulludunida
- Round Mountain

== See also ==
- List of mountains of Australia § New South Wales
- Warrumbungles
