= North West Slopes =

- Region
- Country: Australia
- State: New South Wales
- LGAs: Tamworth Regional Council; Narrabri Shire; Gunnedah Shire; Gwydir Shire

Government
  - State electorates: Barwon; Northern Tablelands; Tamworth
  - Federal divisions: New England; Parkes
Regions around North West Slopes
Far West	South Downs	Northern Tablelands
Far West	North West Slopes	New England
Orana	Central West	Central Tablelands

The North West Slopes region of New South Wales, Australia, refers generally to the area west of the Northern Tablelands, to the north of the Central West region and to the east of the Far West region. Despite its name, the region is in north-central New South Wales, corresponding generally to the Australian Bureau of Meteorology's forecast area of North West Slopes and Plains. The administrative areas of the region include the city of Tamworth, Gunnedah, Moree, Narrabri and Inverell.

The region is higher, hillier and wetter on its eastern edge than on its western edge; with the exception of the steeply-rising Nandewar Range which lies in the west of the region. The North West Slopes are situated on various tributaries to the Darling River, such as the Barwon, Gwydir, and Namoi Rivers, which rise in the Great Dividing Range country to its east.

The region has one city, Tamworth. The North West Slopes also includes the towns of Gunnedah, Bingara, Manilla, Boggabri, Mungindi, Narrabri, Moree, Quirindi and Wee Waa; and many villages.

It has traditionally been a major wheat-growing area, but in recent decades irrigated crops, especially cotton, have become significant. The primary exports are cotton, coal, beef, lamb and pork, cereal and oilseed grains.

The North West region is traversed by the New England Highway, the Newell Highway, the Kamilaroi Highway, the Oxley Highway and the Gwydir Highway; and by railways such as the Main Western railway line, linking Bourke to Sydney with connections to the port of Newcastle. The Main North railway line trains no longer continue to the Queensland border, but Werris Creek, Tamworth and Kootingal are still served by the NSW TrainLink Xplorer service between Sydney and Armidale.

Mount Kaputar National Park, near Narrabri, is within the North West Slopes region.

This region is often included as part of the New England region. Sometimes the region is also known as the New England North West or less commonly the Northern Inland Region when it also includes the Northern Tablelands.

Local Government Areas include Gunnedah Shire, Liverpool Plains Shire, Moree Plains Shire, Narrabri Shire, Gwydir Shire and Tamworth Regional Council.

== Climate ==
The climate here is at the mercy of the Horse Latitudes high pressure belt for the grand majority of the year. Thus a distinct summer rainfall peak is observed, in stark contrast to its more poleward counterpart, the South West Slopes (wherein a spring or winter rainfall peak is observed). The seasonal range of maximum temperatures is also strikingly narrower than that observed in the South West Slopes.

Summers are long, stable and very hot, with severe thunderstorms and supercells a frequent occurrence. Winters are considerably sunnier than those further south; cold by nightfall, though mild and sometimes even warm by day; constituting a great diurnal range and frequent, oftentimes heavy frost.

Snow is a very rare occurrence in the lowlands (snow has been recorded as low as Gunnedah), though it occurs annually on high-points such as the Nandewar Range, Warrumbungles and Coolah Tops. Even so, it is far from a regular occurrence on account of the region's northern latitude. In nearly all cases, a snowfall event this far north requires a cut-off low system: in which the coldest air bypasses the usual southern alpine regions, instead advancing in a north-northeasterly direction up the centre of New South Wales.

== See also ==
- New England (New South Wales)
- Regions of New South Wales
