= Mount Kaputar National Park =

National park in New South Wales, Australia

- IUCN category II (national park)
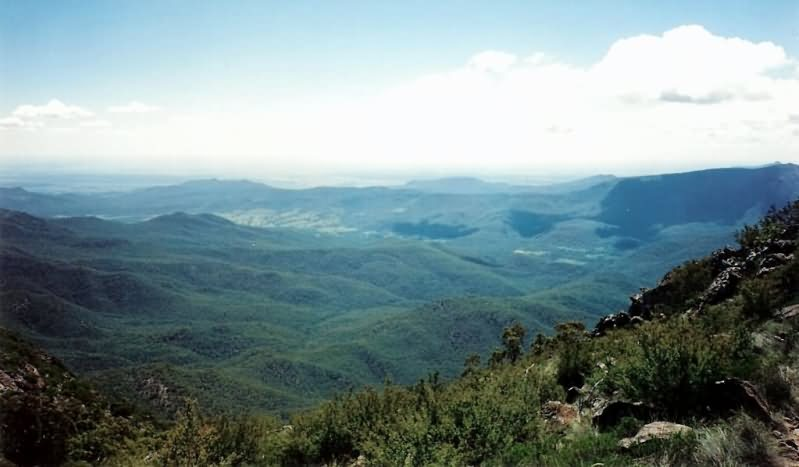
- View of the park from the top of Mount Kaputar, oriented approximately west

- Location within New South Wales
- Location: New South Wales
- Coordinates: 30°17′26″S 150°08′34″E
- Area: 502.25 km^{2} (193.92 sq mi)
- Governing body: Regional Board, Australia; National Parks and Wildlife Service
- Managing Authorities

The Mount Kaputar National Park is a national park located in New South Wales, Australia, surrounding the proximities of Mount Kaputar, a volcano active between 17 and 21 million years ago. It is located 50 km (31 mi) east of Narrabri and 570 km (354 mi) northwest of Sydney. Millions of years of erosion have since carved the volcanic region into the lava terraces, volcanic plugs, and dykes of Nandewar Range. The central feature of the region is Mount Kaputar, the park's namesake, which rises to an altitude of 1,510 m (4,954 ft). The 360 degree view from the summit of the mountain encompasses one-tenth of New South Wales' area or 80,000 square kilometres (31,000 sq mi).

The park protects a wide range of biomes, including semi-arid woodland, subalpine heath, and eucalypt forests, and provides a habitat for a range of animals, including bats, birds, wallabies, quolls, and the unique red triangle slug (Triboniophorus graeffei) and pink slug (Triboniophorus sp. nov. 'Kaputar'), which are known to appear after rainfall.

== History ==
Before it was a national park, the area was used largely as grazing land for domestic animals. The conditions in the park are very harsh, but several pioneering families lived there, and remnants of their occupation remain. Sheep and cattle continued to graze on the plateau until around the 1950s. It was an isolated place, and the stockmen in charge of the cattle often would not see another human for months at a time.

In 1925, some 775 ha (3 sq mi) of land around Mount Kaputar were declared a "Reserve for Public Recreation". Two years later, a trust, known as the Mount Kaputar Trust, was formed to give guidance on managing the park. The area was expanded to 14,244 ha (55 sq mi) and proclaimed a full national park in 1959. Eight years later, in 1967, the Fund relinquished the duties of controlling the park to the newly established National Parks and Wildlife Service, and the park is still administered by a regional advisory board.

== Facilities and activities ==
In 1965, two cabins were constructed at Dawsons Spring, providing accommodations including a permanent water supply for showers and toilets, and a picnic facility. Today there are three cabins, including one facilitated from Bark Hut.

The park is popular with rockclimbers, and there are 11 walks in the park, as well as a camping ground. However, the most popular site in the park is Scutts Hut, located upward of Kurrawonga Falls. The hut is the former home of the Scutt family, a pioneer family living in the vicinity of the park. it is accessible via a fire trail from the Bark Hut camping grounds. The hut has been restored to its original livery, with an earthen floor and an open fireplace. The hut is built on the banks of Horsearm Creek, which flows into Kurrawonga Falls.

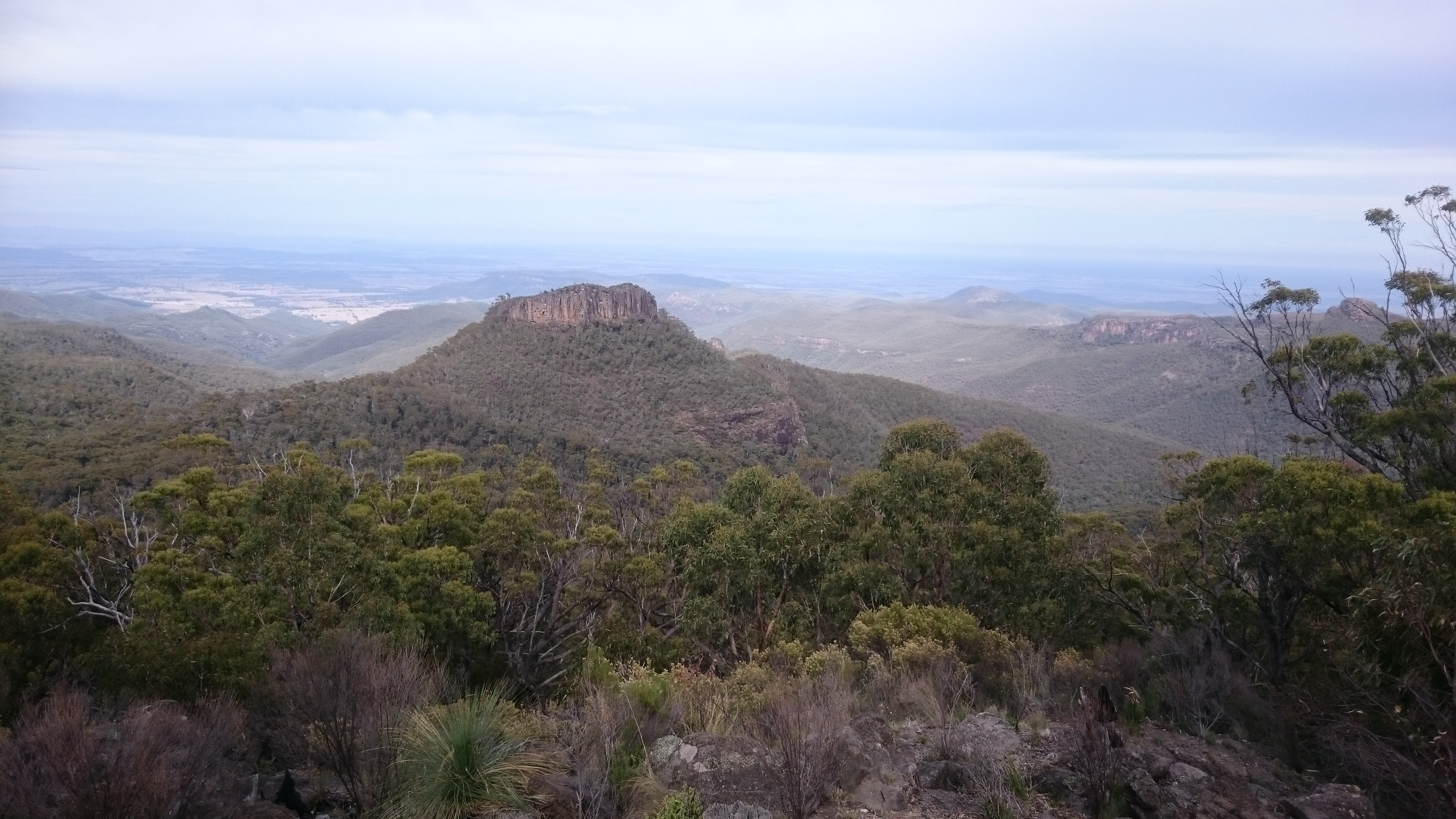
Euglah Rock

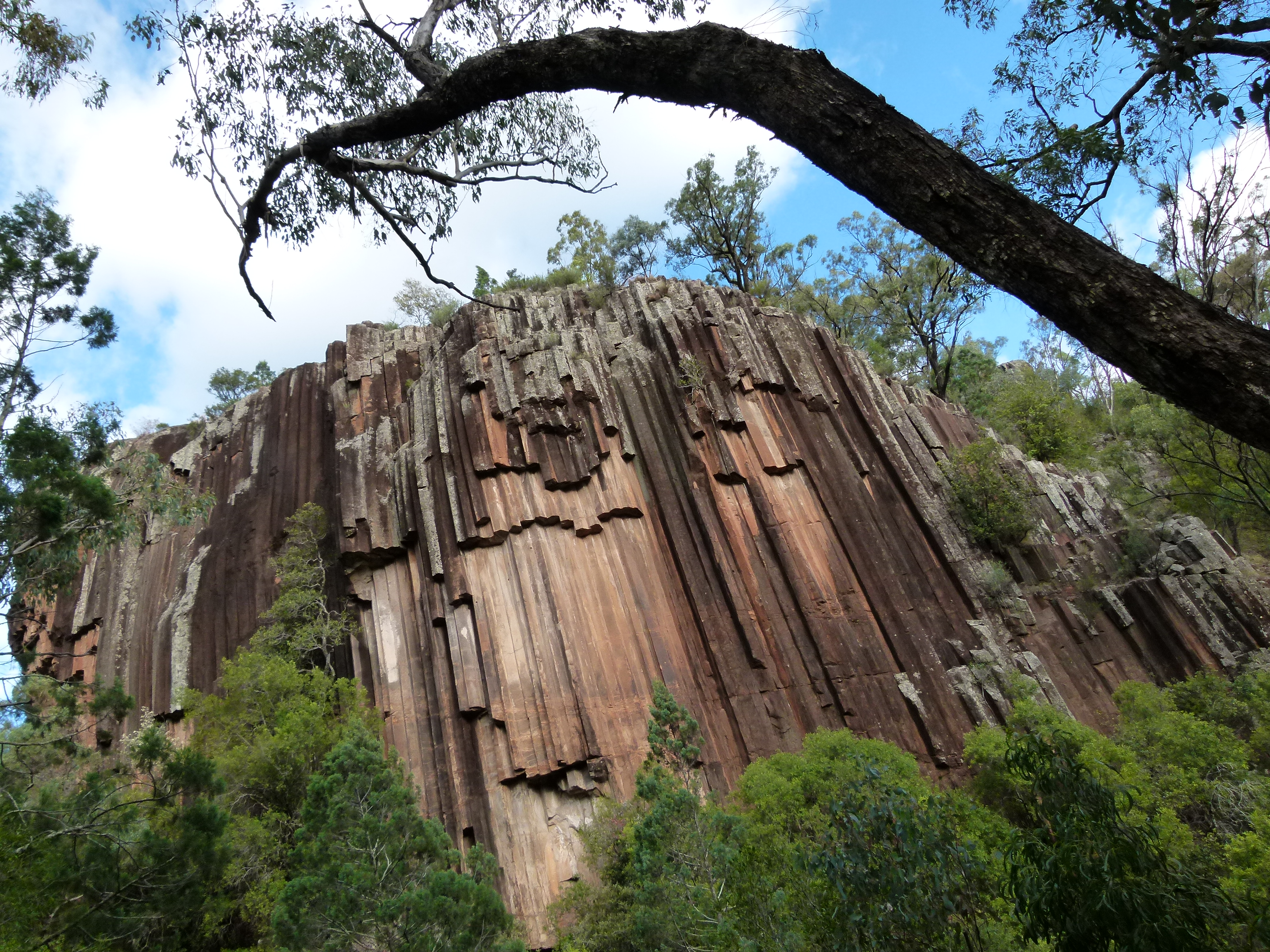
Sawn Rocks

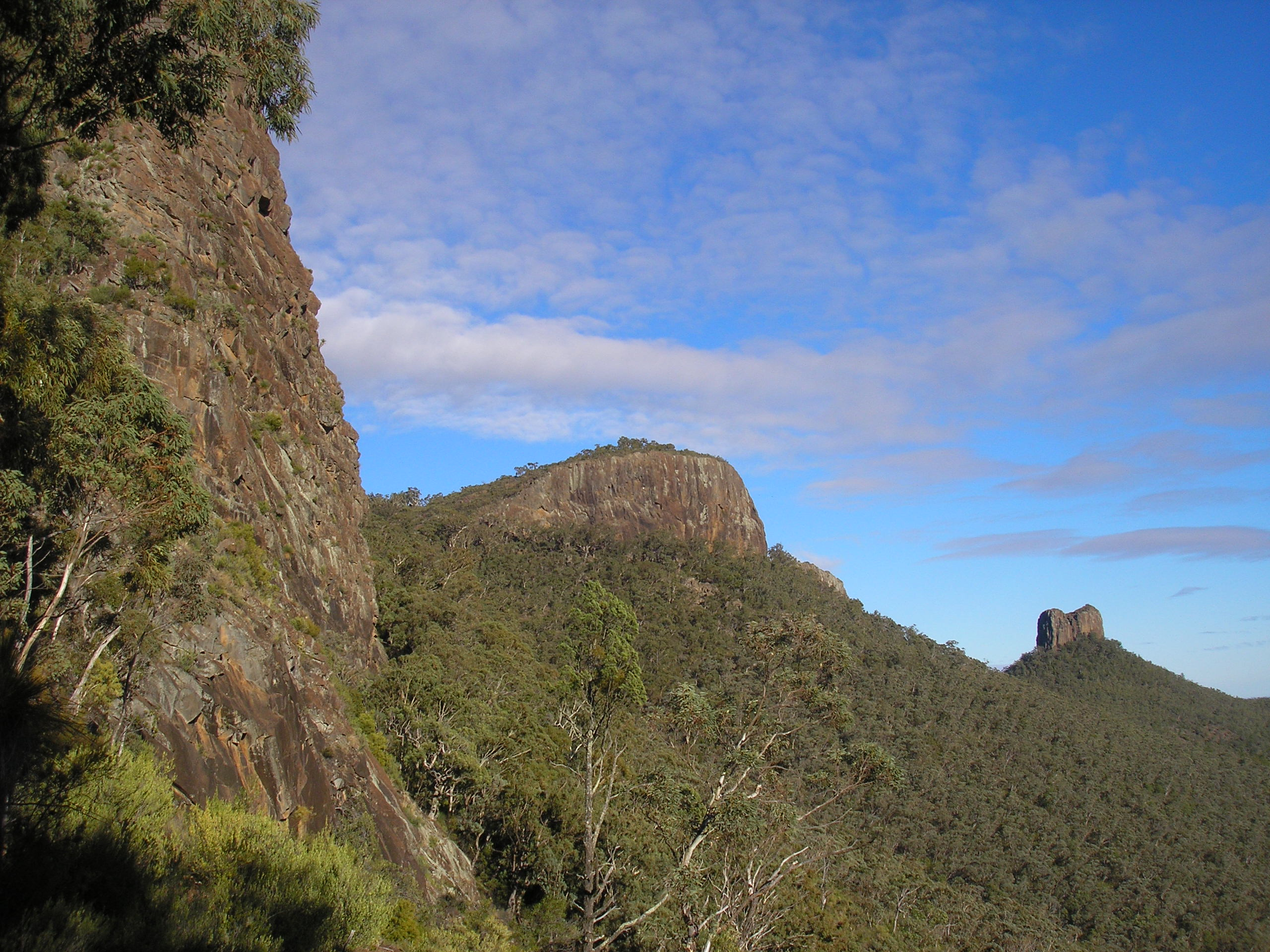
Mount Yulludunida (left) and Mount Ningadhun (right)

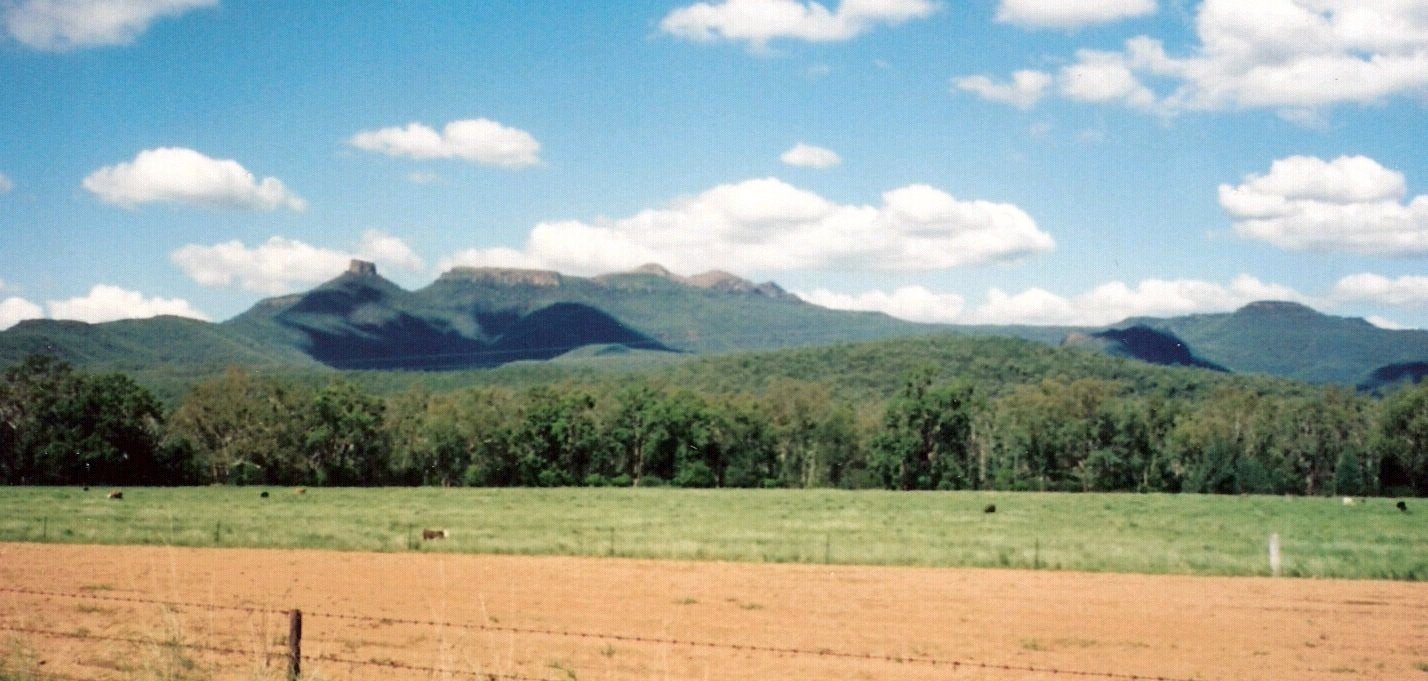
Mount Kaputar and the Nandewar Range

== See also ==
- Protected areas of New South Wales
