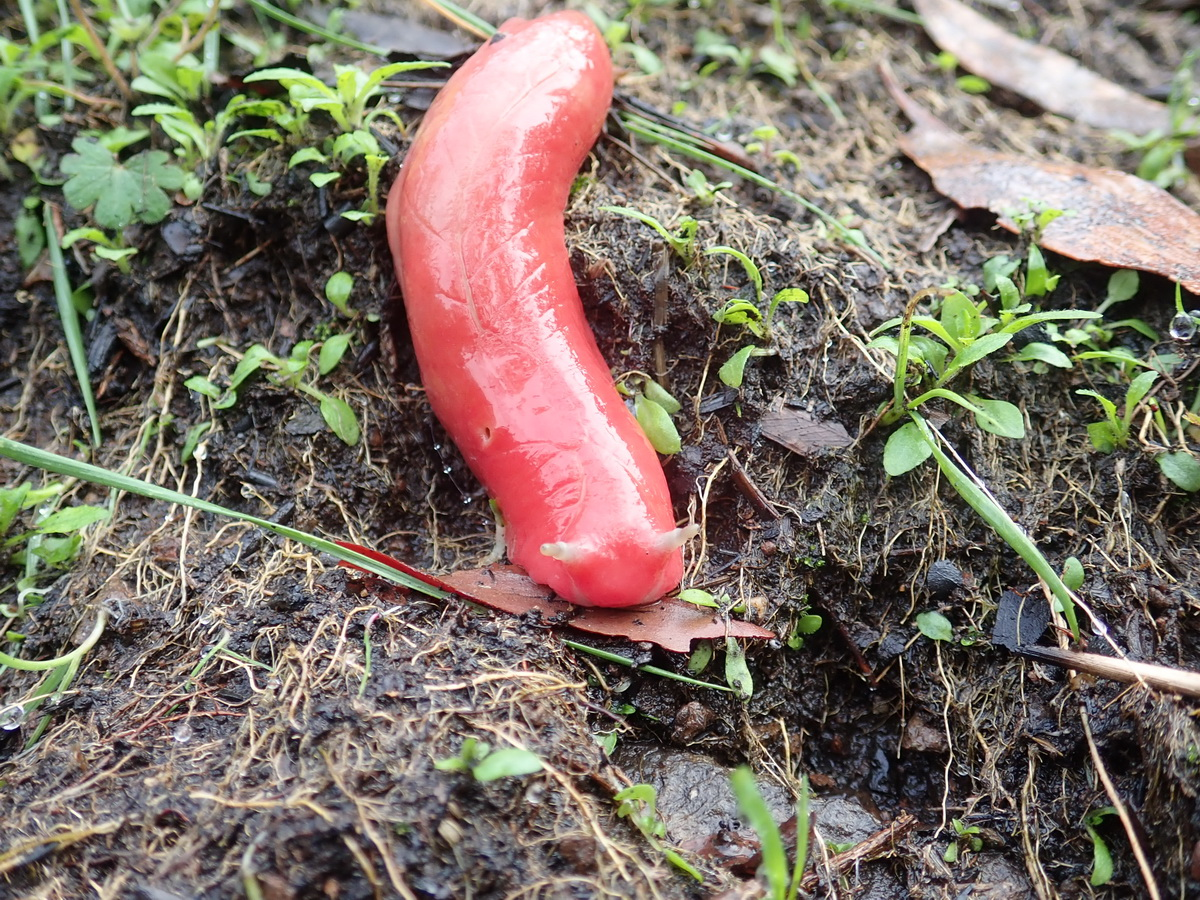

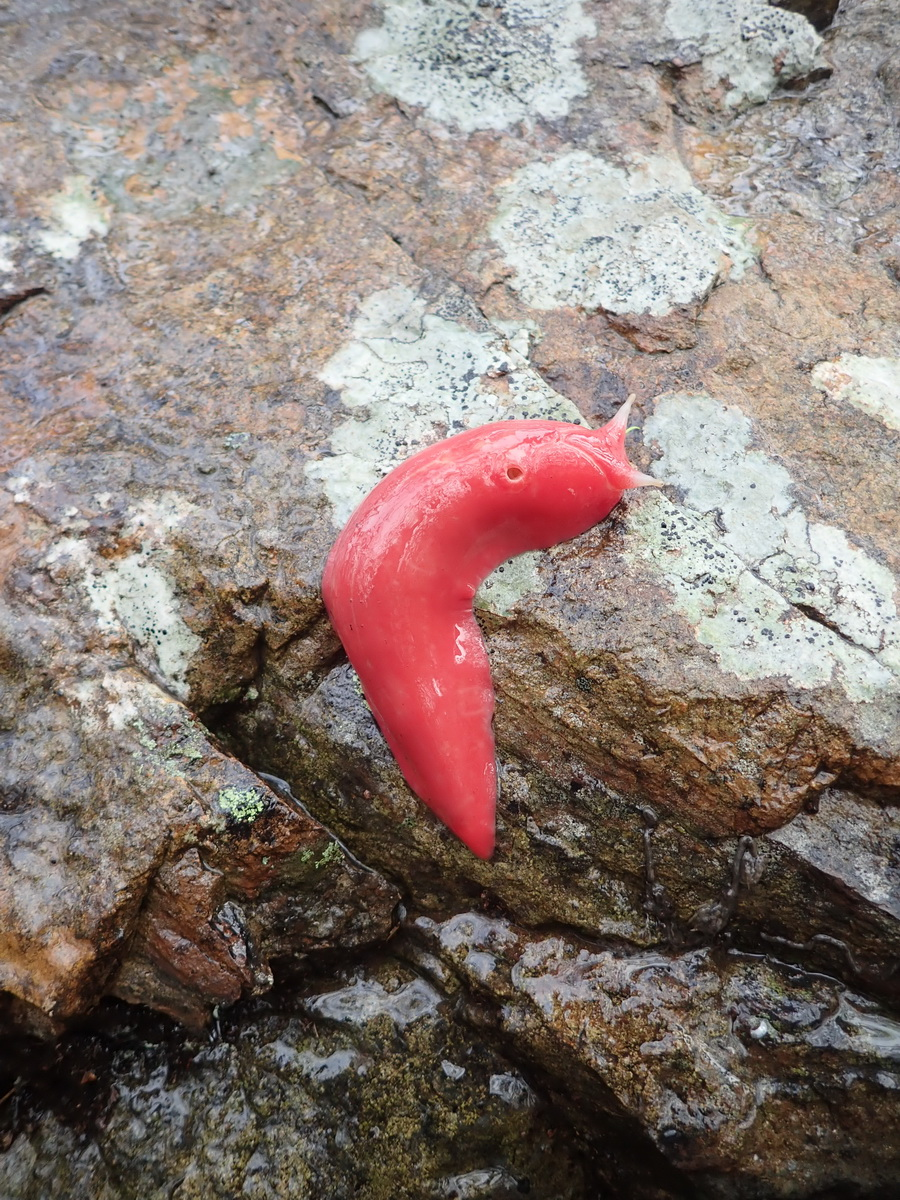

Conservation status
- Endangered (IUCN 3.1)

Scientific classification
- Kingdom: Animalia
- Phylum: Mollusca
- Class: Gastropoda
- Order: Stylommatophora
- Infraorder: Succineoidei
- Superfamily: Athoracophoroidea
- Family: Athoracophoridae
- Subfamily: Aneitinae
- Genus: Triboniophorus
- Species: Triboniophorus sp. nov. 'Kaputar'

Binomial name
- Triboniophorus sp. nov. 'Kaputar'

Synonyms
- Triboniophorus aff. graeffei

= Triboniophorus sp. nov. 'Kaputar' =

Mt. Kaputar pink slug

Species of Gastropoda

Triboniophorus sp. nov. 'Kaputar', also known as Triboniophorus aff. graeffei, or the Mount Kaputar pink slug, is a species of giant air-breathing land slug with a distinctive hot pink hue. These slugs are found on Mount Kaputar in Australia. Taxonomists have confirmed that these slugs are not conspecific with the better-known "red triangle slug", Triboniophorus graeffei.

== Distribution and habitat ==
The slugs have only been found at the top of Mount Kaputar, an inland mountain near Narrabri in northern New South Wales within Mount Kaputar National Park, at an altitude around 1,500 metres (4,900 ft) surrounded by snow gum trees. They have been observed to stay within this area, which is estimated to be 100 square kilometres (40 sq mi). Most of the top of the mountain is designated wilderness. Although the mountain is surrounded by dry plains, it receives rainfall and snow, and its temperature is 10 °C (18 °F) cooler than the plains. Thus it forms an isolated ecozone, or sky island; such sky islands are known for unique indigenous fauna and flora.

Around 90% of the total population of the species are thought to have perished in the 2019 Australian bushfires; the population has seen recovery in several sites.

== Life ==
The slugs can be seen by the hundreds on cool, wet, misty mornings. During the day, they hide in the plant litter at the base of the trees. At night, they come out and climb the tree to eat algae and mosses growing on the tree trunk. The slugs climb down the tree trunk in the early morning to hide and repeat the cycle.

In the ecosystem, the slugs break down the plant litter into nutrient-rich soil to promote plant growth. They also serve as food for birds and other animals.

== Description ==
The slugs are fluorescent pink in color and up to about 20 centimetres (8 in) in length. In an Australian Broadcasting Corporation interview, New South Wales National Parks and Wildlife Service Ranger Michael Murphy described the color: "as bright pink as you can imagine, that's how pink they are".

== Origins ==
Triboniophorus sp. nov. 'Kaputar' is closely related but not identical to Triboniophorus graeffei, the red triangle slug. Taxonomists have confirmed the fluorescent pink species' distinction from the red triangle slug. The slug has relatives in New Guinea, New Caledonia, New Zealand, and eastern Africa. These land masses once connected with Australia as the Gondwanaland supercontinent.

A volcanic eruption at Mount Kaputar 17 million years ago created a high-altitude area where these slugs and other invertebrates and plants have lived isolated for millions of years after the surrounding rainforests of eastern Australia vanished due to climate change.

== In popular culture ==
Nearby town Narrabri is proposing to build a "big pink slug" to celebrate the slug.
