= Pseudaneitea multistriata =

Scientific classification
- Kingdom: Animalia
- Phylum: Mollusca
- Class: Gastropoda
- Order: Stylommatophora
- Family: Athoracophoridae
- Subfamily: Athoracophorinae
- Genus: Pseudaneitea; Cockerell, 1891
- Species: P. multistriata

Binomial name
- Pseudaneitea multistriata Burton, 1963

Species of land slug

Pseudaneitea multistriata is a species of air-breathing land slug, a terrestrial gastropod mollusc in the family Athoracophoridae, the leaf-veined slugs. This species was first described by David Winn Burton in 1963. The holotype specimen, collected at Big South Cape Island by Richard Dell during the Tītī / Muttonbird Islands Expedition 1955, is held at Te Papa.

Pseudaneitea multistriata is a species of air-breathing land slug, a terrestrial gastropod mollusc in the family Athoracophoridae, commonly known as the leaf-veined slugs. The species is native to New Zealand and was first described scientifically by David Winn Burton in 1963.

The holotype specimen was collected on Big South Cape Island by Richard Dell during the Tītī / Muttonbird Islands Expedition 1955. The specimen is held in the collections of Te Papa Tongarewa in Wellington, New Zealand.

Pseudaneitea multistriata belongs to the family Athoracophoridae, a group of terrestrial gastropods endemic to New Zealand and parts of Australia. Members of the family are characterized by their elongated bodies and distinctive vein-like markings, which give them their common name, leaf-veined slugs.
