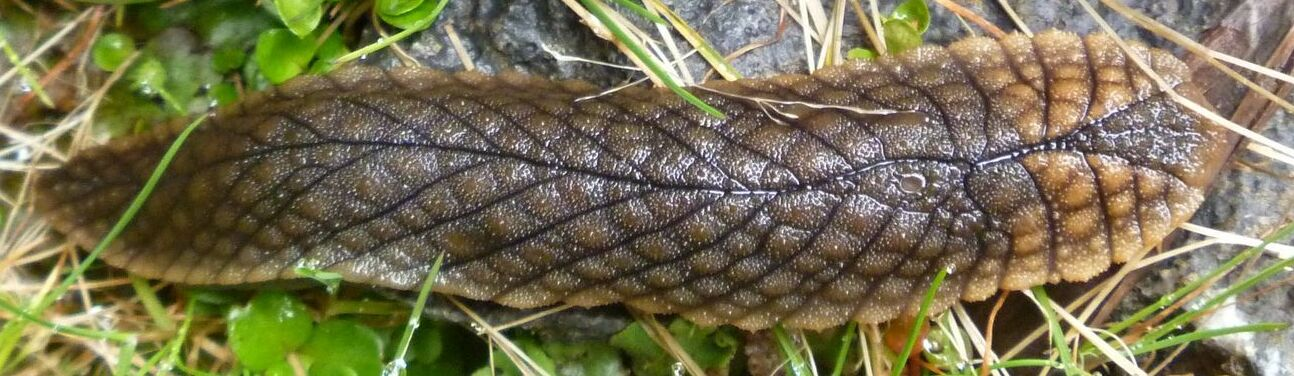

Scientific classification
- Kingdom: Animalia
- Phylum: Mollusca
- Class: Gastropoda
- Order: Stylommatophora
- Family: Athoracophoridae
- Subfamily: Athoracophorinae
- Genus: Pseudaneitea; Cockerell, 1891
- Species: P. gigantea

Binomial name
- Pseudaneitea gigantea (Suter, 1909)

Synonyms
- Athoracophorus (Amphikonophora) giganteus Suter, 1909

= Pseudaneitea gigantea =

Species of gastropod

Pseudaneitea gigantea is a species of air-breathing land slug, a terrestrial gastropod mollusc in the family Athoracophoridae, the leaf-veined slugs. It was first described by Henry Suter in 1909.
