= Pseudaneitea sorenseni =

Scientific classification
- Kingdom: Animalia
- Phylum: Mollusca
- Class: Gastropoda
- Order: Stylommatophora
- Family: Athoracophoridae
- Subfamily: Athoracophorinae
- Genus: Pseudaneitea; Cockerell, 1891
- Species: P. sorenseni

Binomial name
- Pseudaneitea sorenseni Powell, 1955

Species of gastropod

Pseudaneitea sorenseni is a leaf-veined slug, a terrestrial gastropod mollusc in the family Athoracophoridae.
