= Pseudaneitea dendyi =

Scientific classification
- Kingdom: Animalia
- Phylum: Mollusca
- Class: Gastropoda
- Order: Stylommatophora
- Family: Athoracophoridae
- Subfamily: Athoracophorinae
- Genus: Pseudaneitea; Cockerell, 1891
- Species: P. dendyi

Binomial name
- Pseudaneitea dendyi (Suter, 1897)

Species of mollusc

Pseudaneitea dendyi is a species of air-breathing land slug, a terrestrial gastropod mollusc in the family Athoracophoridae, the leaf-veined slugs.
