= Pseudaneitea schauinslandi =

Scientific classification
- Kingdom: Animalia
- Phylum: Mollusca
- Class: Gastropoda
- Order: Stylommatophora
- Family: Athoracophoridae
- Genus: Pseudaneitea
- Species: P. schauinslandi

Binomial name
- Pseudaneitea schauinslandi (Plate, 1897)

Species of gastropod

Pseudaneitea schauinslandi is a species of air-breathing land slug, a terrestrial gastropod mollusc in the family Athoracophoridae, the leaf-veined slugs.

== Distribution ==
New Zealand, Stephens Island and Marlborough Sounds.
