= Pseudaneitea marmorata =

Scientific classification
- Kingdom: Animalia
- Phylum: Mollusca
- Class: Gastropoda
- Order: Stylommatophora
- Family: Athoracophoridae
- Genus: Pseudaneitea
- Species: P. marmorata

Binomial name
- Pseudaneitea marmorata (Simroth, 1889)

Synonyms
- List: Athoracophorus (Amphiconophora) martensi Suter, 1909; Athoracophorus (Pseudaneitea) martensi Suter, 1909; Athoracophorus marmoratus Simroth, 1889; Athoracophorus martensi Suter, 1909; Pseudaneitea martensi (Suter, 1909); Reflectopallium marmoratum (Simroth, 1889)

Species of gastropod

Pseudaneitea marmorata is a species of air-breathing land slug, specifically a leaf-veined slug, a terrestrial gastropod mollusc in the family Athoracophoridae.
