= Pseudaneitea delli =

Scientific classification
- Kingdom: Animalia
- Phylum: Mollusca
- Class: Gastropoda
- Order: Stylommatophora
- Family: Athoracophoridae
- Genus: Pseudaneitea
- Species: P. delli

Binomial name
- Pseudaneitea delli (Burton, 1963)

Synonyms
- Reflectopallium delli Burton, 1963

Species of gastropod

Pseudaneitea delli is an air-breathing land slug, specifically a leaf-veined slug, a terrestrial gastropod mollusc in the family Athoracophoridae.
