= Athoracophorus maculosus =

Scientific classification
- Kingdom: Animalia
- Phylum: Mollusca
- Class: Gastropoda
- Order: Stylommatophora
- Family: Athoracophoridae
- Genus: Athoracophorus
- Species: A. maculosus

Binomial name
- Athoracophorus maculosus Burton, 1963

Species of gastropod

Athoracophorus maculosus is a species of air-breathing land slug, a terrestrial gastropod mollusc in the family Athoracophoridae, the "leaf-veined" slugs. This species was first described by David Winn Burton in 1963. The holotype specimen, collected at Karamea Bluff in 1949, is held at Te Papa.
