= Pseudaneitea aspera =

Scientific classification
- Kingdom: Animalia
- Phylum: Mollusca
- Class: Gastropoda
- Order: Stylommatophora
- Family: Athoracophoridae
- Genus: Pseudaneitea
- Species: P. aspera

Binomial name
- Pseudaneitea aspera Burton, 1963

Species of gastropod

Pseudaneitea aspera is a species of air-breathing land slug, a terrestrial gastropod mollusc in the family Athoracophoridae, the leaf-veined slugs. This species was first described by David Winn Burton in 1963.
