= Pseudaneitea pseudophyllum =

Scientific classification
- Kingdom: Animalia
- Phylum: Mollusca
- Class: Gastropoda
- Order: Stylommatophora
- Family: Athoracophoridae
- Genus: Pseudaneitea
- Species: P. pseudophyllum

Binomial name
- Pseudaneitea pseudophyllum (Burton, 1963)

Synonyms
- List: Pseudaneitea pseudophylla (Burton, 1963); Reflectopallium papillatum Burton, 1963; Reflectopallium pseudophyllum Burton, 1963

Species of gastropod

Pseudaneitea pseudophyllum is a species of air-breathing land slug, specifically a leaf-veined slug, a terrestrial pulmonate gastropod mollusc in the family Athoracophoridae.

== Distribution ==
This species is endemic to Mount Algidus on the South Island of New Zealand.
