= J. maculata =

J. maculata may refer to:

- Janella maculata, a land slug
- Junodia maculata, a praying mantis
