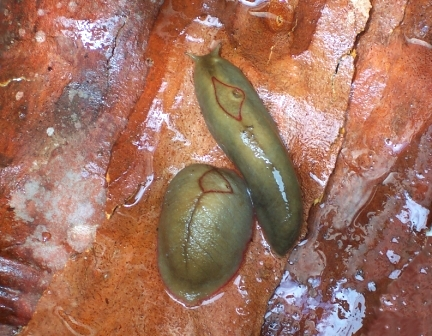
- Two individuals of Triboniophorus graeffei on Angophora costata bark, Chatswood West, NSW, Australia

Scientific classification
- Domain: Eukaryota
- Kingdom: Animalia
- Phylum: Mollusca
- Class: Gastropoda
- Order: Stylommatophora
- Family: Athoracophoridae
- Subfamily: Aneitinae
- Genus: Triboniophorus; Humbert, 1863

Species
- T. brisbanensis Pfeiffer, 1900; T. graeffei Humbert, 1863; T. sp. nov. 'Kaputar'

= Triboniophorus =

Genus of gastropods

Triboniophorus is a genus of air-breathing land slugs, terrestrial pulmonate gastropod molluscs in the family Athoracophoridae, the leaf-veined slugs.

== Species ==
Species within this genus include:

- Triboniophorus graeffei Humbert, 1863 – the red triangle slug – type species
- Triboniophorus sp. nov. 'Kaputar', a fluorescent pink species, also known as Triboniophorus aff. graeffei
- incertae sedis Triboniophorus insularis (Grimpe & Hoffmann, 1925)

Triboniophorus brisbanensis Pfeiffer, 1900: Synonym of Triboniophorus graeffei (anatomy at page 316.)

== Description ==
These slugs have two, not four, tentacles, and like other leaf-vein slugs they have an indented pattern on their dorsum which resembles the veins of a leaf.
