= Pseudaneitea simrothi =

Scientific classification
- Kingdom: Animalia
- Phylum: Mollusca
- Class: Gastropoda
- Order: Stylommatophora
- Family: Athoracophoridae
- Genus: Pseudaneitea
- Species: P. simrothi

Binomial name
- Pseudaneitea simrothi (Suter, 1896)

Species of gastropod

Pseudaneitea simrothi is a species of air-breathing land slug, a terrestrial gastropod mollusc in the family Athoracophoridae, the leaf-veined slugs.
