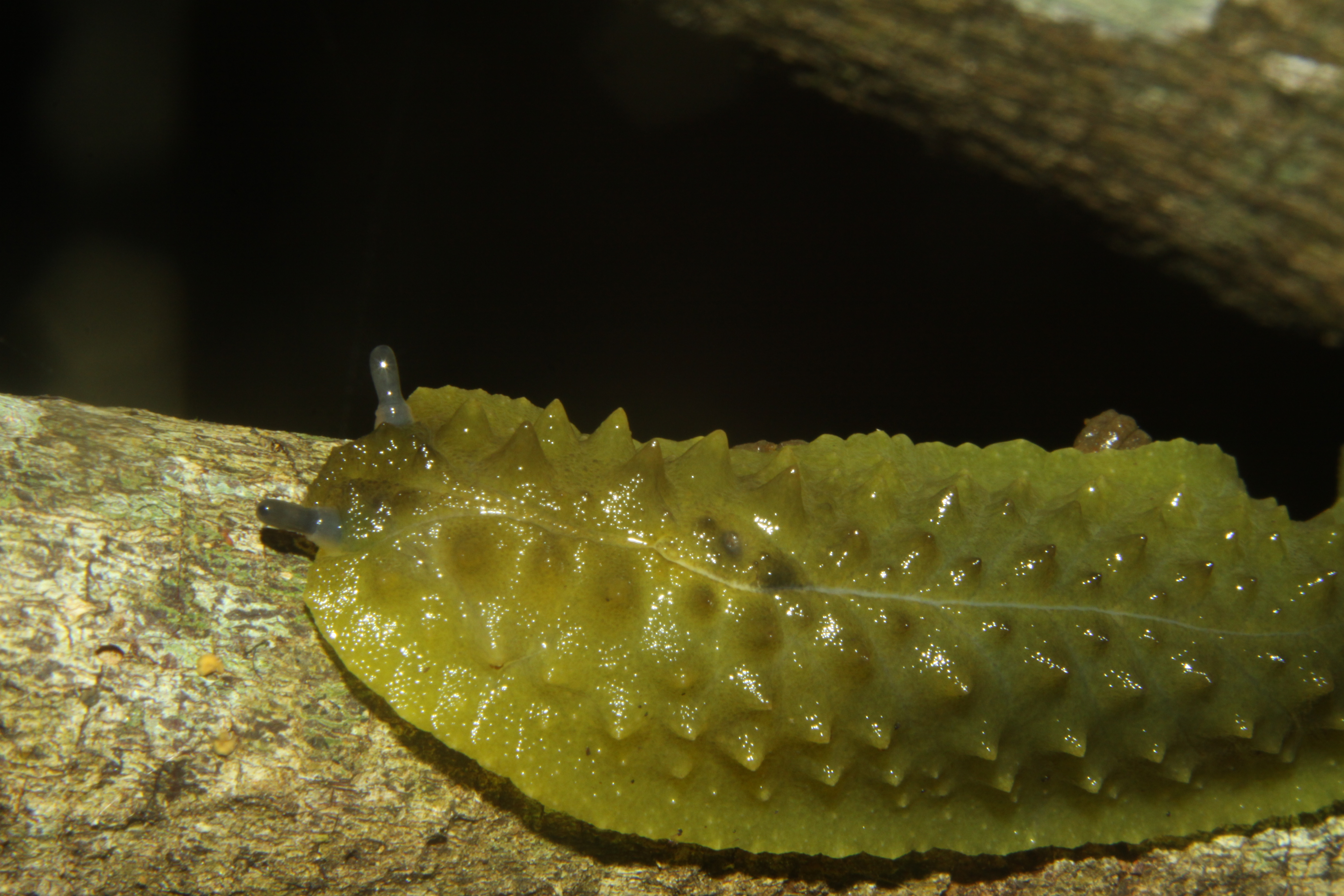
- Pseudaneitea papillata

Scientific classification
- Kingdom: Animalia
- Phylum: Mollusca
- Class: Gastropoda
- Order: Stylommatophora
- Family: Athoracophoridae
- Subfamily: Athoracophorinae
- Genus: Pseudaneitea; Cockerell, 1891

Synonyms
- List: Amphiconophora Suter, 1909; Amphikonophora Suter, 1897; Athoracophorus (Amphiconophora); Athoracophorus (Amphikonophora) Suter, 1897; Athoracophorus (Pseudaneitea) Cockerell, 1891; Reflectopallium Burton, 1963

= Pseudaneitea =

Genus of gastropods

Pseudaneitea is a genus of air-breathing land slugs, terrestrial gastropod molluscs in the family Athoracophoridae, the leaf-veined slugs.

== Species ==
The following species are recognised in the genus Pseudaneitea:

- Pseudaneitea aspera Burton, 1963
- Pseudaneitea campbellensis Burton, 1963
- Pseudaneitea delli (Burton, 1963)
- Pseudaneitea dendyi (Suter, 1897)
- Pseudaneitea gigantea (Suter, 1909)
- Pseudaneitea grana Burton, 1983
- Pseudaneitea gravisulca Burton, 1963
- Pseudaneitea huttoni (Suter, 1909)
- Pseudaneitea johnsi Burton, 1963
- Pseudaneitea leva Burton, 1977
- Pseudaneitea maculata Burton, 1963
- Pseudaneitea marmorata (Simroth, 1889)
- Pseudaneitea multistriata Burton, 1963
- Pseudaneitea nodosa Burton, 1977
- Pseudaneitea pallida Climo, 1973
- Pseudaneitea powelli Burton, 1963
- Pseudaneitea pseudophyllum (Burton, 1963)
- Pseudaneitea ramsayi Climo, 1973
- Pseudaneitea schauinslandi (Plate, 1897)
- Pseudaneitea simrothi (Suter, 1896)
- Pseudaneitea sorenseni Powell, 1955
