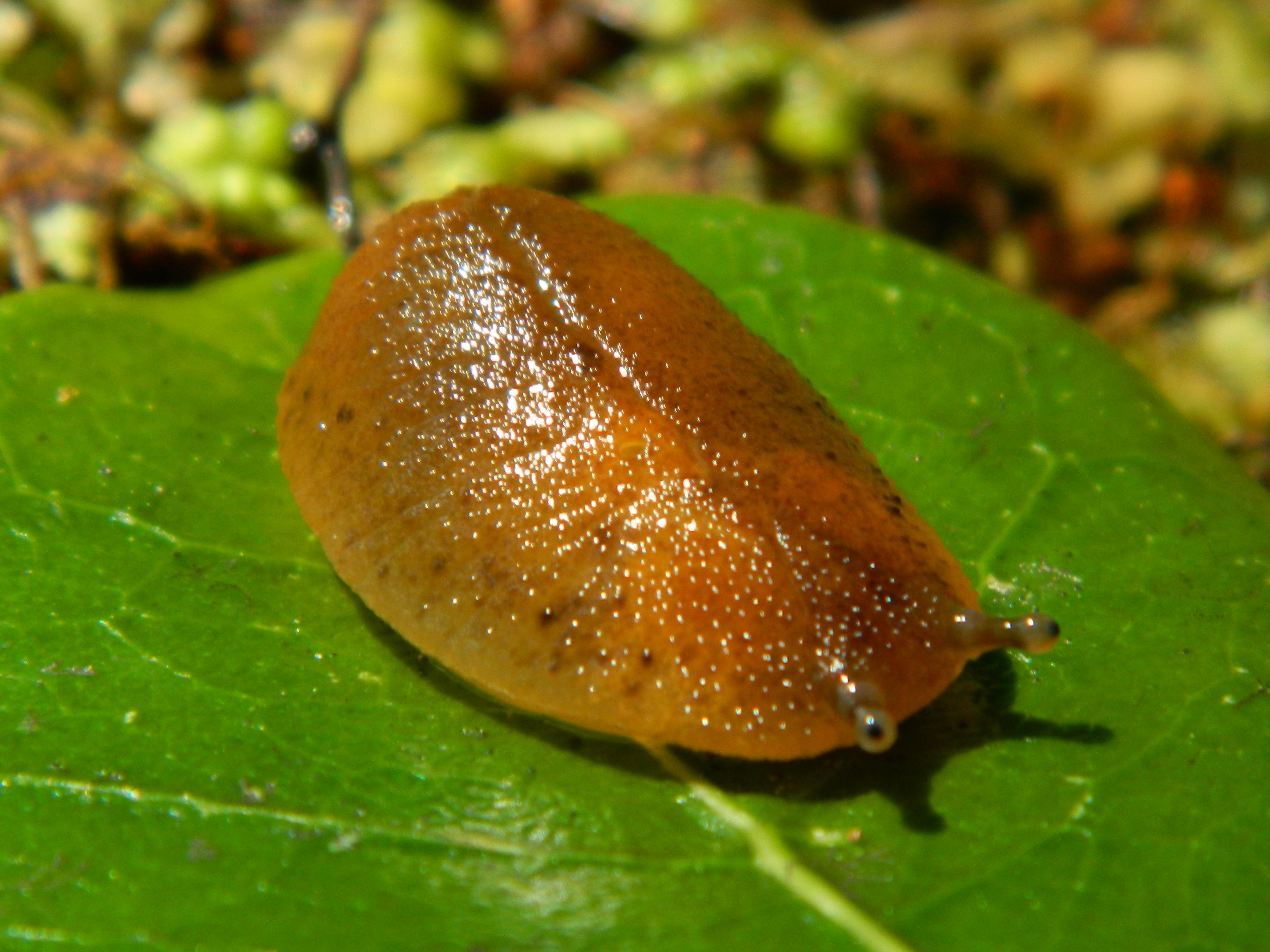
- Leaf-veined native slug at Ship Creek near Haast

Scientific classification
- Kingdom: Animalia
- Phylum: Mollusca
- Class: Gastropoda
- Order: Stylommatophora
- Family: Athoracophoridae
- Genus: Athoracophorus
- Species: A. bitentaculatus

Binomial name
- Athoracophorus bitentaculatus (Quoy & Gaimard, 1832)

Synonyms
- Limax bitentaculatus Quoy & Gaimard, 1832; Janella antipodarum Gray, 1853; Neojanella dubia Cockerell, 1891; Janella maculata Collinge, 1894; Athoracophorus bitentaculatus rufovenosus Suter, 1909

= Athoracophorus bitentaculatus =

Species of land slug

Athoracophorus bitentaculatus, is a species of land slug endemic to New Zealand.

== Ecology ==
Parasites of Athoracophorus bitentaculatus include:

- Hugotdiplogaster neozelandia (Nematoda, Diplogasteridae) (in the penis and oviduct)

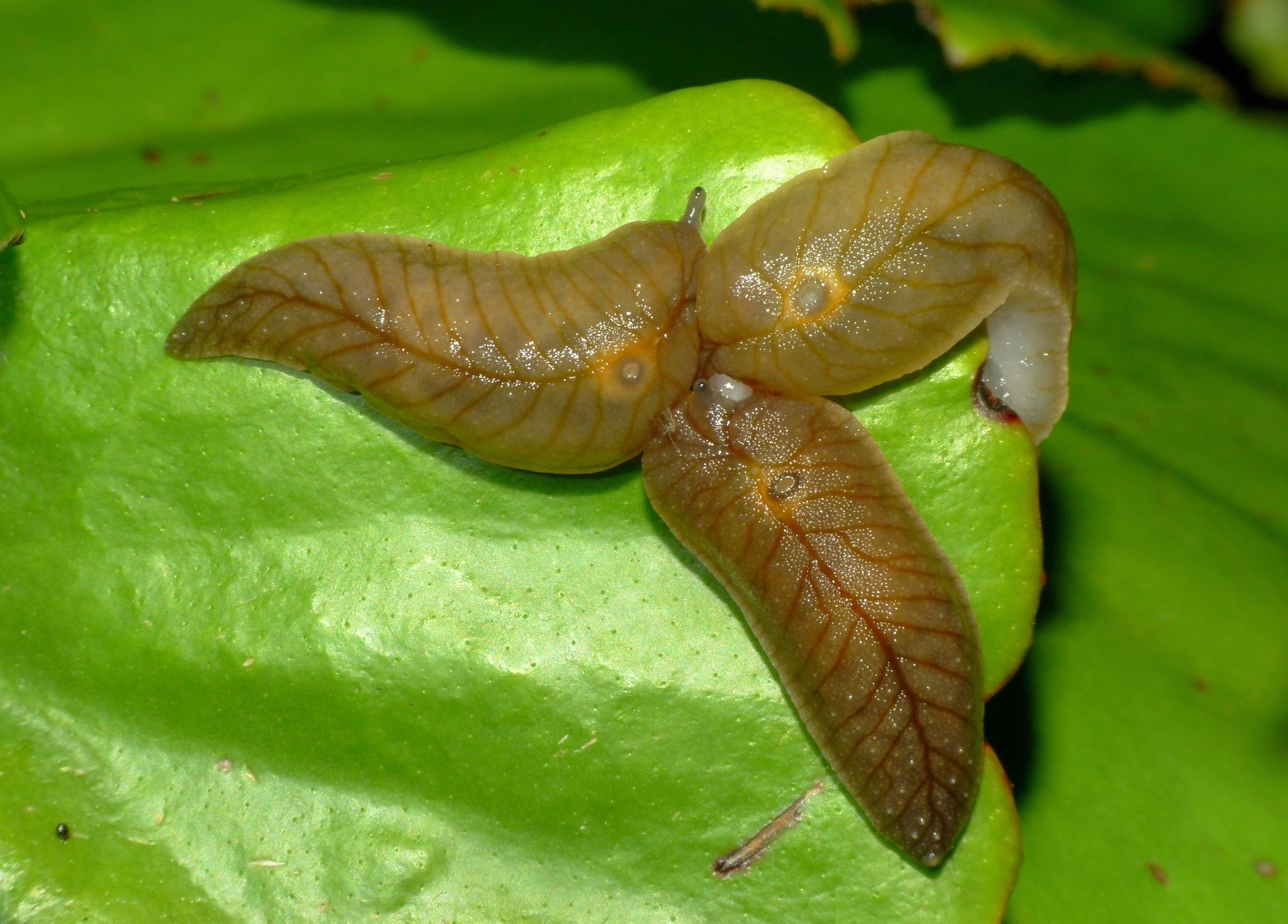
Mating
