= Palliopodex =

Scientific classification
- Kingdom: Animalia
- Phylum: Mollusca
- Class: Gastropoda
- Order: Stylommatophora
- Family: Athoracophoridae
- Subfamily: Athoracophorinae
- Genus: Palliopodex; Burton, 1963
- Species: P. verrucosus

Binomial name
- Palliopodex verrucosus (Simroth, 1889)

Species of mollusc

Palliopodex verrucosus is a leaf-veined slug, an air-breathing land slug or terrestrial gastropod mollusc in the family Athoracophoridae. It is endemic to New Zealand's subantarctic Auckland Islands. It is the only species in the genus Palliopodex
