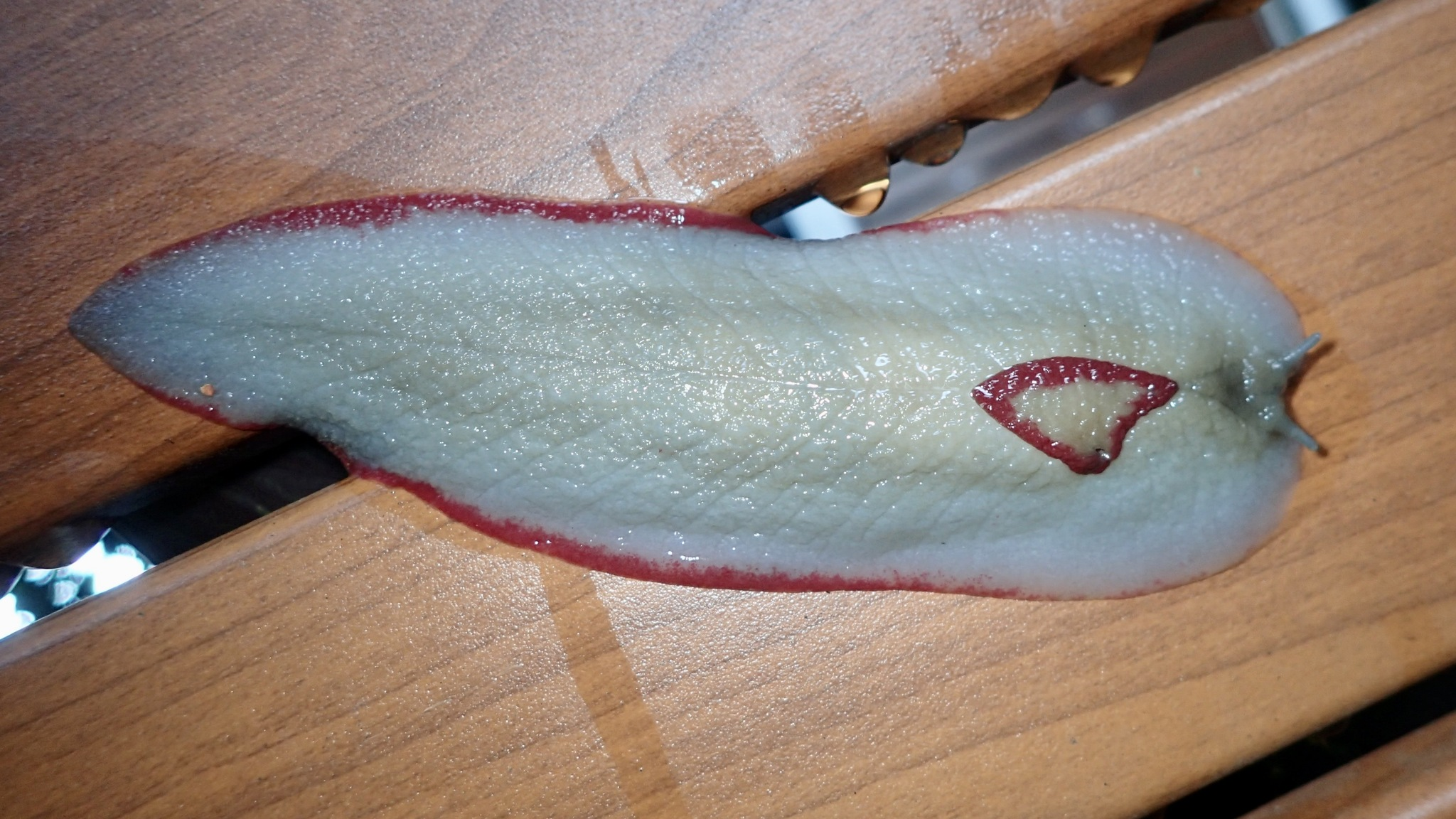
- In Brisbane

Scientific classification
- Kingdom: Animalia
- Phylum: Mollusca
- Class: Gastropoda
- Order: Stylommatophora
- Superfamily: Athoracophoroidea
- Family: Athoracophoridae
- Subfamily: Aneitinae
- Genus: Triboniophorus
- Species: T. graeffei

Binomial name
- Triboniophorus graeffei Humbert, 1863
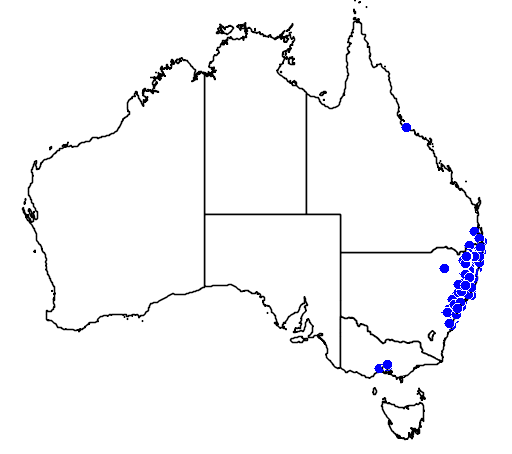
- Distribution

= Red triangle slug =

Species of gastropod

The red triangle slug, Triboniophorus graeffei, is a species of air-breathing land slug, a terrestrial pulmonate gastropod molluscs in the family Athoracophoridae, the leaf-veined slugs. Native to eastern Australia, this species is named after the distinctive red triangle marking on its back. Reaching lengths of up to 15 centimeters (about 6 inches), it is not only striking in appearance but also holds the title of Australia's largest native land slug. It is a familiar and widespread presence in its natural habitat.

Triboniophorus graeffei is the type species of its genus, Triboniophorus, the key representative of the group. A closely related and visually unique species of Triboniophorus has been identified from Mount Kaputar, though it has yet to be formally described.

== Distribution ==
This slug species is native to the east coast of Australia, where it ranges from New South Wales to Queensland. A closely related and brightly colored pink form, referred to as Triboniophorus aff. graeffei, is found only on Mount Kaputar in New South Wales. In 1959, malacologist Alan Solem suggested the species might have been introduced to the New Hebrides (now Vanuatu), although no specimens were available to confirm this at the time.

== Habitat ==
Red triangle slugs are found in damp situations in various habitats, including city gardens, forests, woodland and heaths.

== Life habits ==
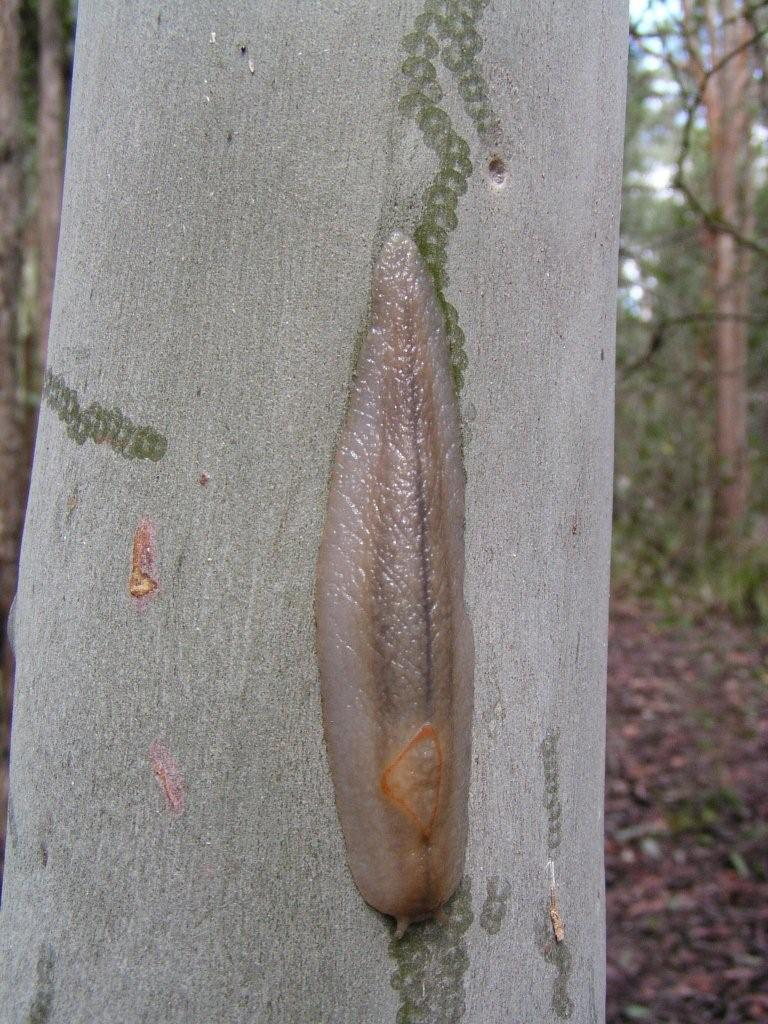
With grazing marks from its radula, on the trunk of a Sydney blue gum, near Dungog, Australia

These slugs feed by grazing on algae that grow on the smooth bark of certain eucalyptus trees and on nearby rocks. Occasionally, they make their way into houses, where they have been observed feeding on mold that develops on bathroom walls.

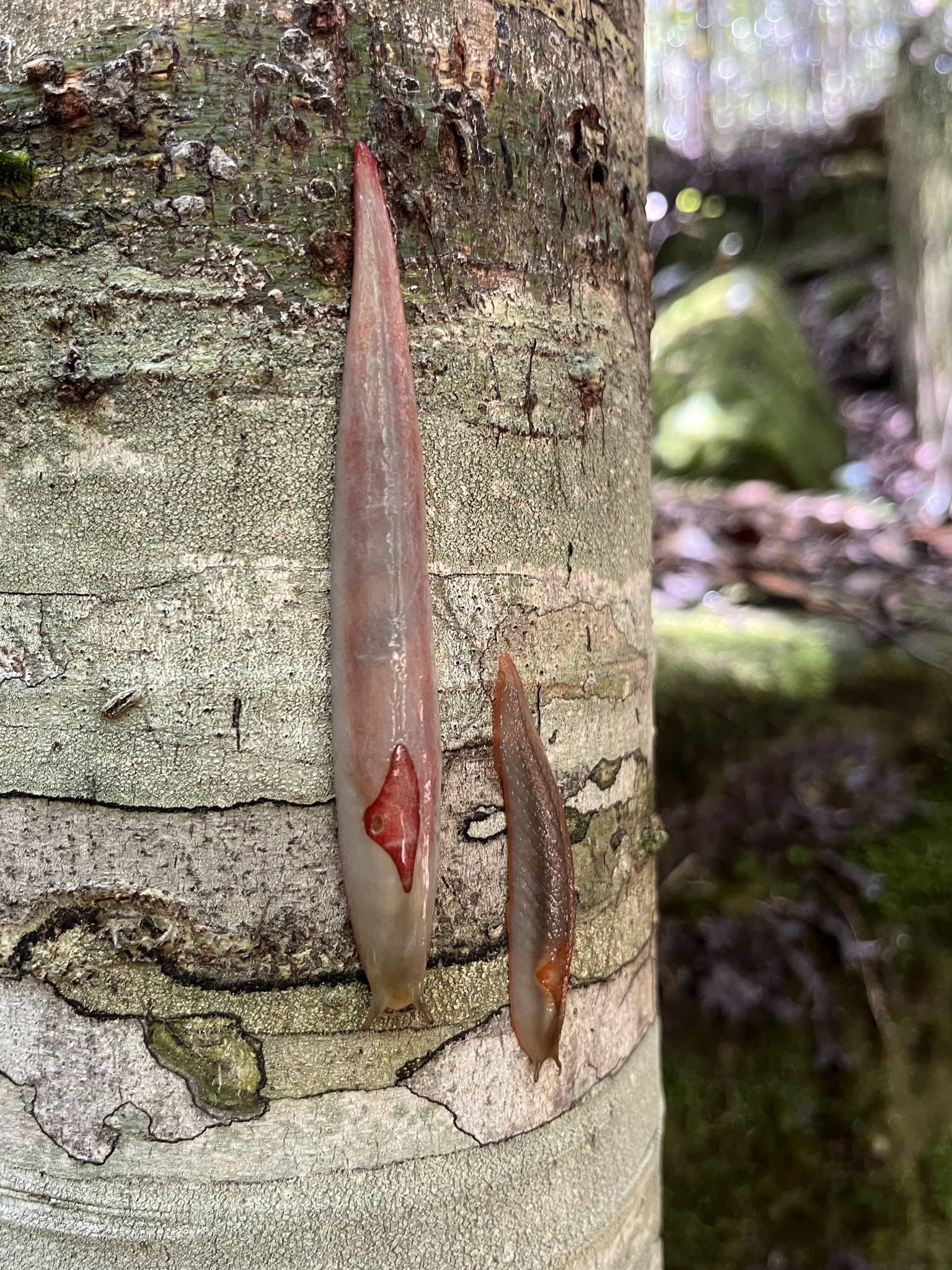
In Watagans National Park

One of the most fascinating features of this species is its unusual defense mechanism. When threatened, the slug can release a special kind of sticky mucus, not the usual slippery slime used for movement. This adhesive secretion is strong enough to trap predators for days. Interestingly, the mucus works best in wet conditions and gradually loses its stickiness as it dries. The cells responsible for producing this glue-like substance are spread across the slug's upper surface (dorsal side).

== Description ==
Red triangle slugs are easily recognized by their two tentacles; unlike many other slugs, they do not have four. Like other leaf-vein slugs, they also have a distinctive indented pattern on their back that resembles the veins of a leaf. These slugs can grow up to 14 centimeters in length.

They are highly variable in color. Individuals can appear white, off-white, yellow, light or dark grey, beige, pink, red, or olive green. Regardless of color, all adults display a red (sometimes orange, magenta, or maroon) triangular mark on the mantle around the breathing pore (pneumostome), as well as a red line along the edge of the foot. The texture of their backs can also differ: some are smooth, while others are rough. Juvenile slugs look quite different from the adults. They lack the red markings but instead have three dark grey stripes running down their backs and a grey outline around the triangular mantle shield. Scientists are currently studying whether some of these different color forms might actually belong to separate species or subspecies.

== Gallery ==
Various shots of Triboniophorus graeffei on the bark of Sydney blue gums, near Dungog, Australia, showing color variation, varying degrees of contraction and body shape.

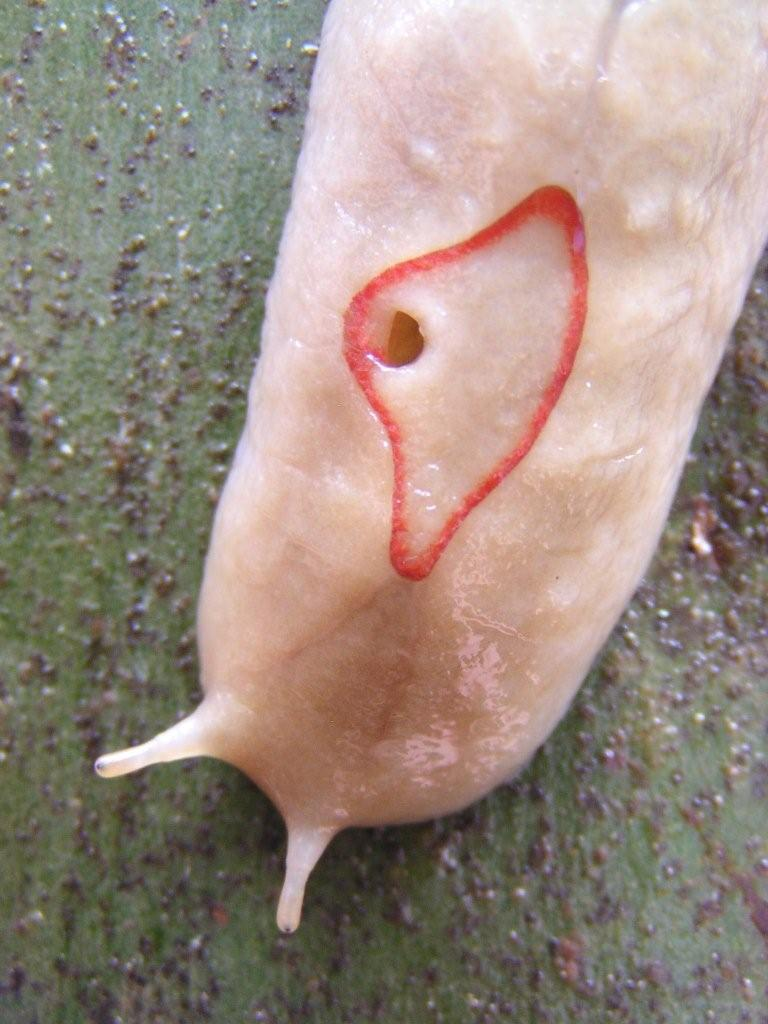
Close-up of a pale pink individual with the pneumostome open and a narrow body, tentacles fully extended

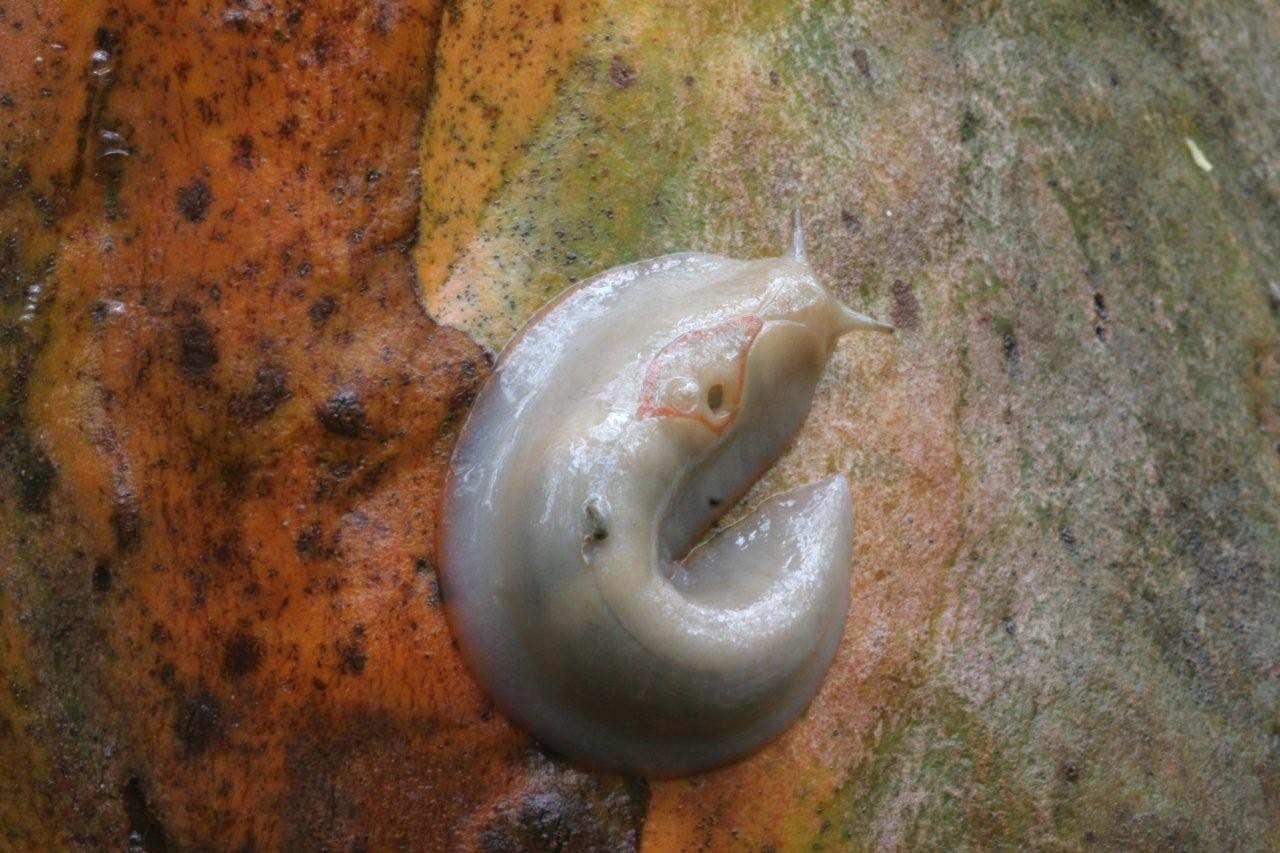
An off-white individual with a very pale "red triangle"

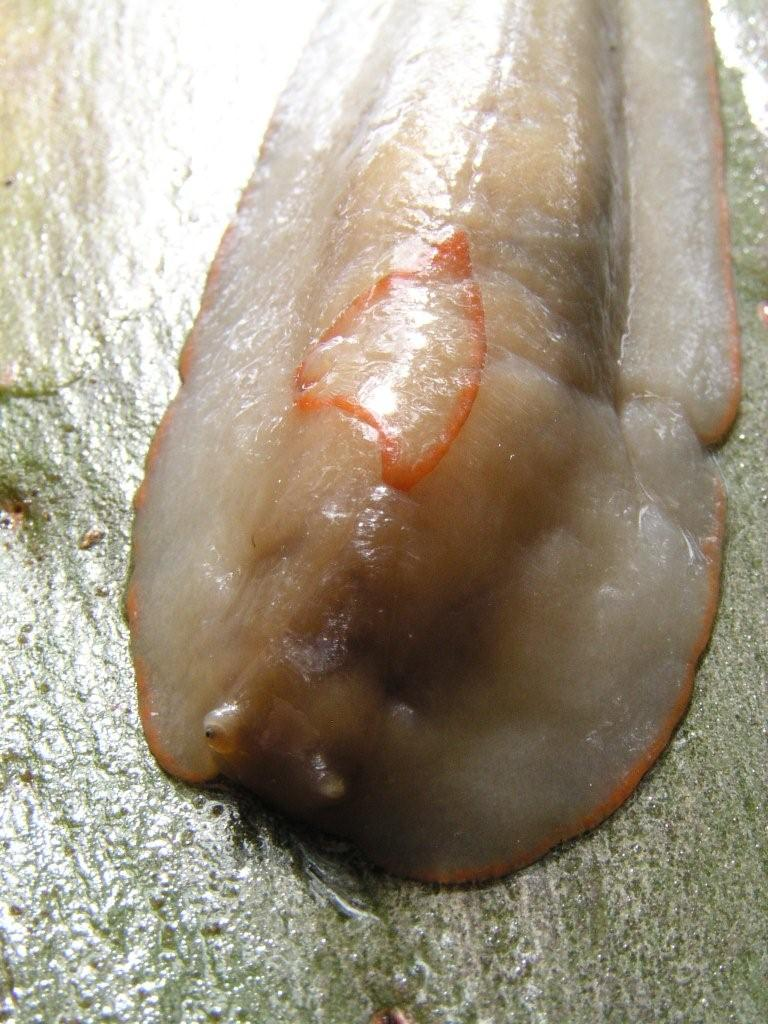
A beige individual with a very wide body and a pale orange "triangle" and foot edge. Tentacles partially retracted

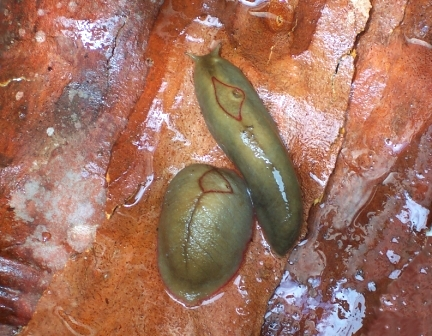
Two individuals of the green form of Triboniophorus graeffei, in the forest in Chatswood West, New South Wales. The slug on the right is starting to become active, the other is in the contracted state.
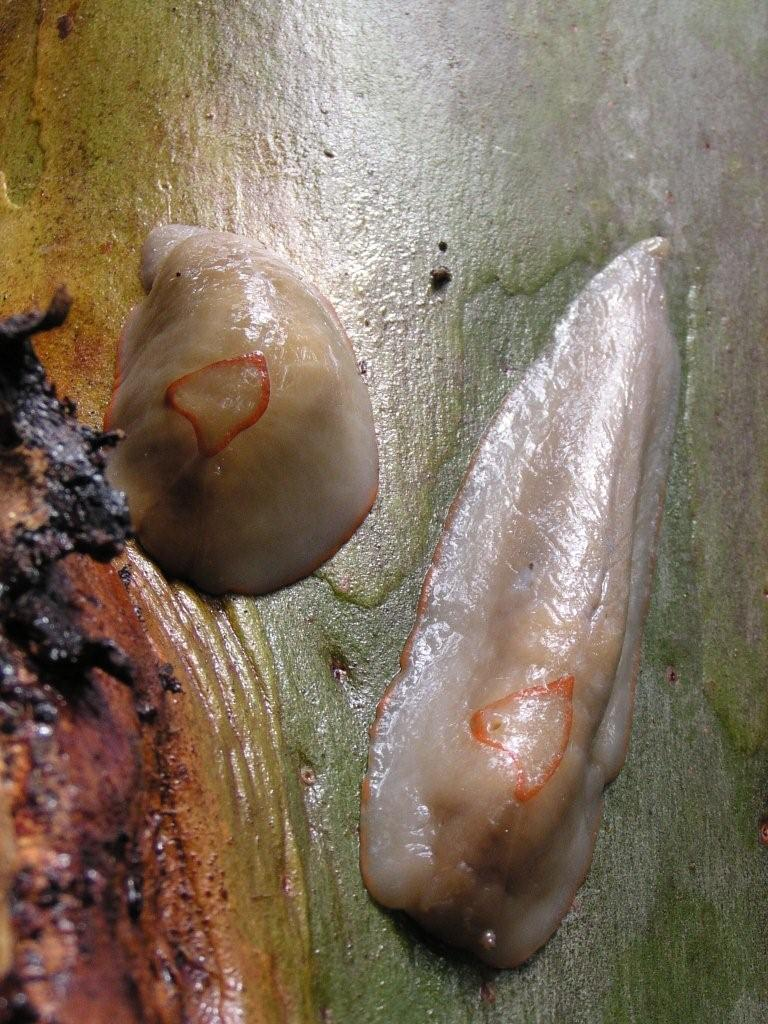
Two individuals, one fully contracted and with pneumostome closed

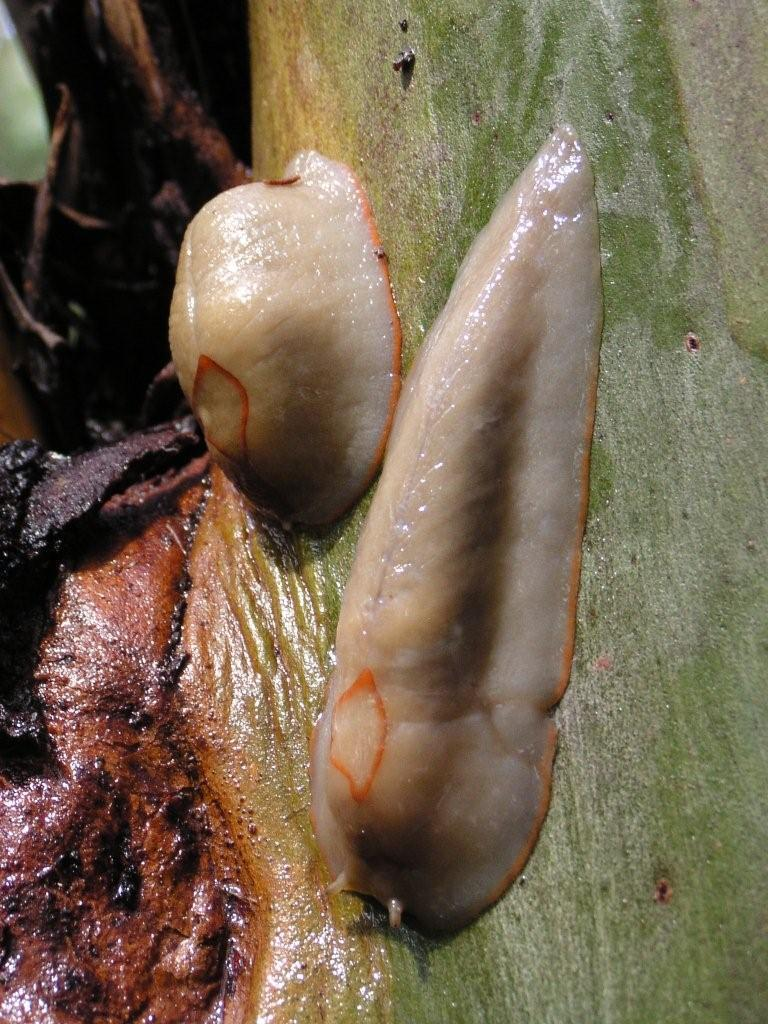
Same two individuals from the side showing the body shape in profile

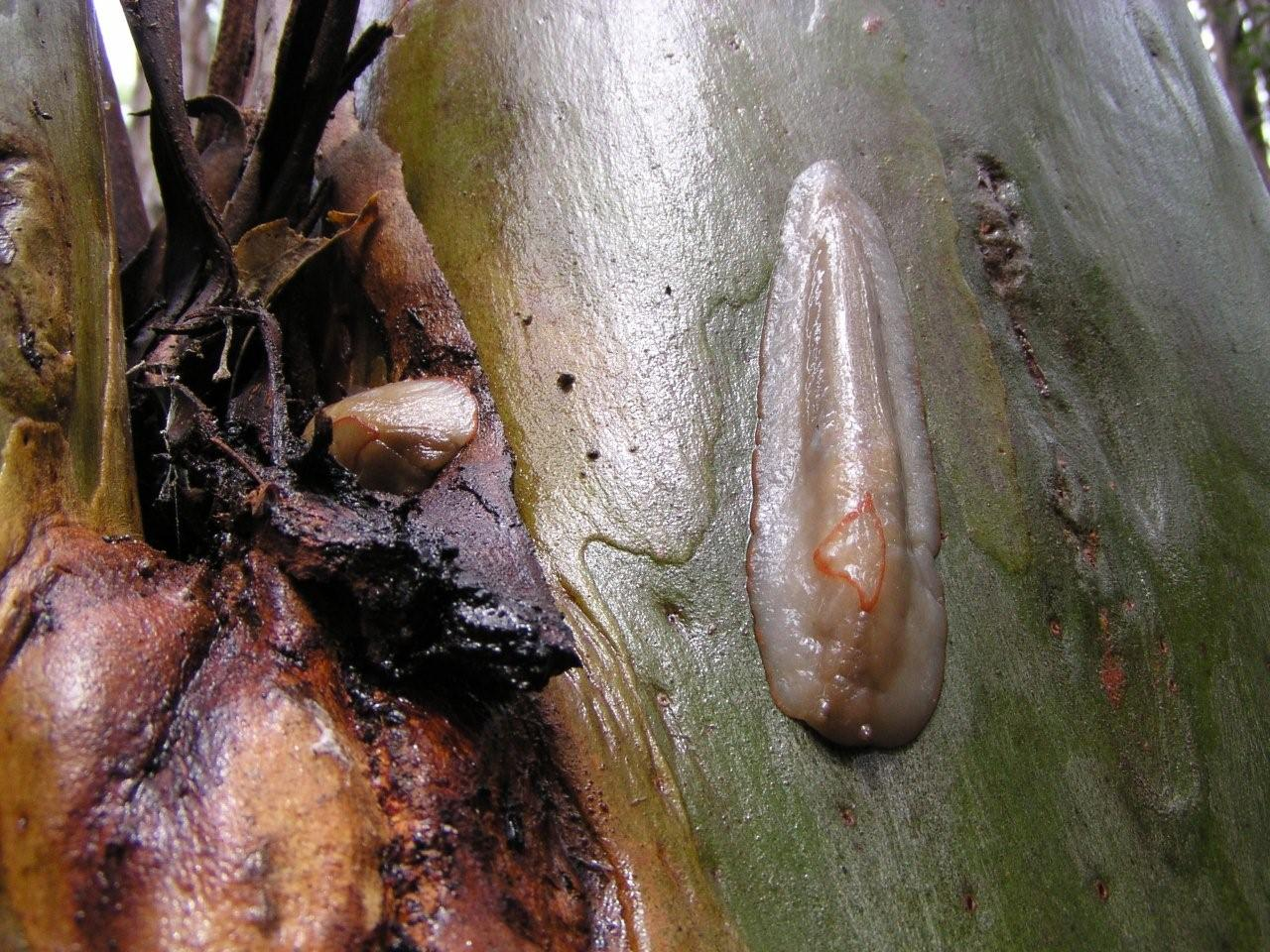
Same two individuals, the previously contracted one has retreated to a less exposed position among old flakes of bark

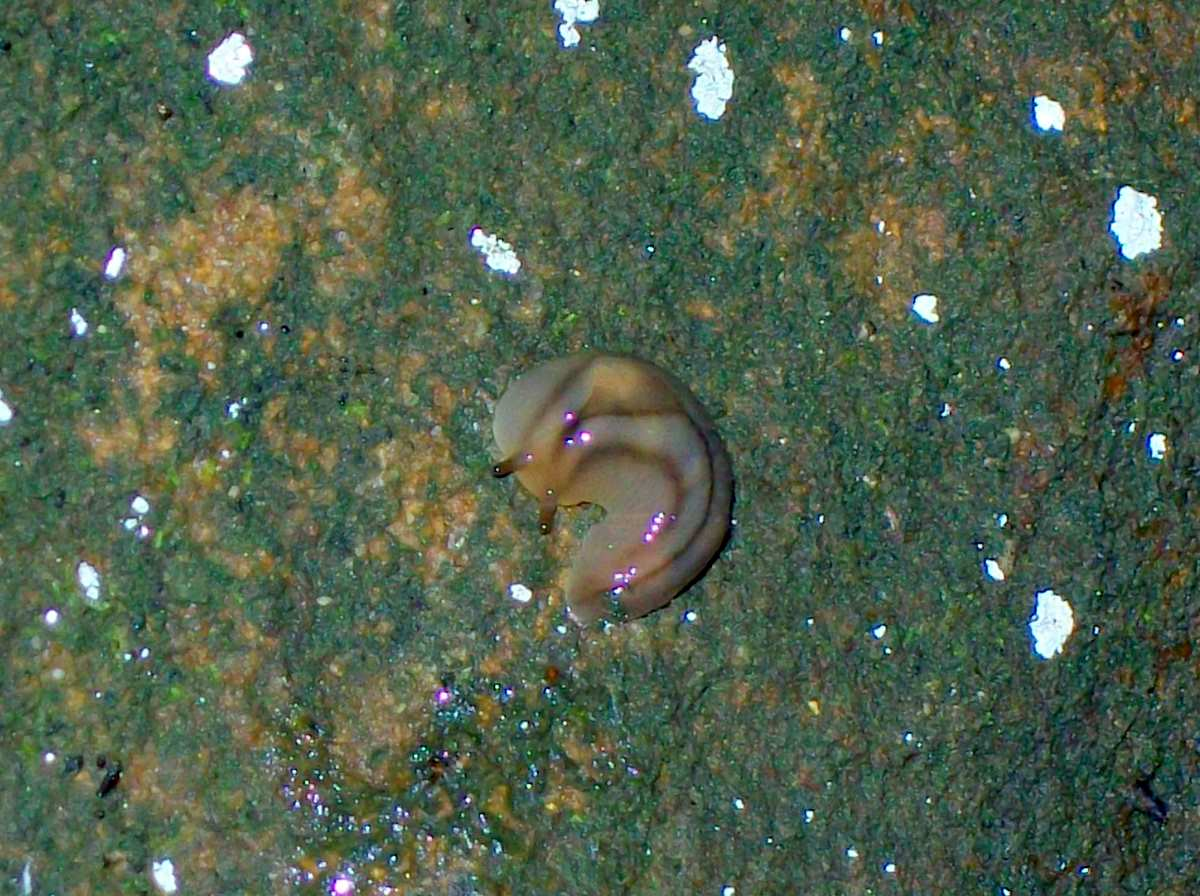
Juvenile Red Triangle Slug on moist Hawkesbury Sandstone, Chatswood West, Australia
