= Alaninema ngata =

Scientific classification
- Domain: Eukaryota
- Kingdom: Animalia
- Phylum: Nematoda
- Class: Chromadorea
- Order: Rhabditida
- Family: Alaninematidae
- Genus: Alaninema
- Species: A. ngata

Binomial name
- Alaninema ngata Ivanova et al., 2013

Species of roundworm

Alaninema ngata is a species of nematode.

== Distribution ==
The species is endemic to New Zealand, where it is widespread.

== Biology ==
The species is an intestinal parasite in terrestrial slugs of the family Athoracophoridae.
