= Alaninema =

Scientific classification
- Kingdom: Animalia
- Phylum: Nematoda
- Class: Chromadorea
- Order: Rhabditida
- Family: Alaninematidae
- Genus: Alaninema; Théodoridés, 1957

Genus of roundworms

Alaninema is a genus of nematodes belonging to the monotypic family Alaninematidae.

Species:

- Alaninema ngata Ivanova, Spiridonov, Clark, Tourna, Wilson & Barker, 2013
- Alaninema njoroensis Puylaert, 1970
- Alaninema venmansi Théodoridés, 1957
