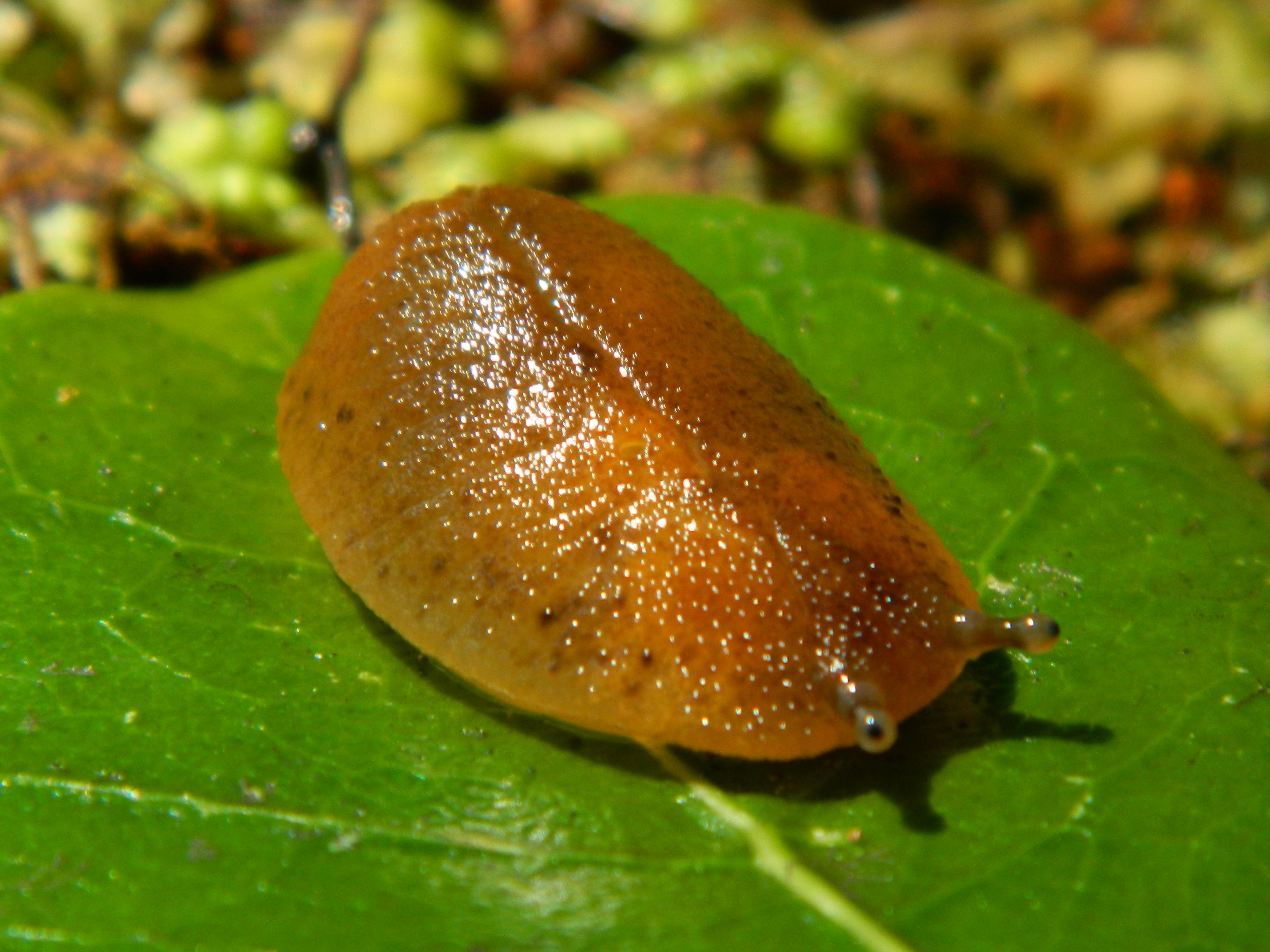
- Athoracophorus bitentaculatus

Scientific classification
- Kingdom: Animalia
- Phylum: Mollusca
- Class: Gastropoda
- Order: Stylommatophora
- Family: Athoracophoridae
- Genus: Athoracophorus; Gould, 1852

Species
- See text

= Athoracophorus =

Genus of gastropods

Athoracophorus is a genus of air-breathing, land slugs, terrestrial pulmonate gastropod molluscs in the family Athoracophoridae.

== Species ==
Species in the genus Athoracophorus include:

- Athoracophorus bitentaculatus (Quoy & Gaimard, 1832)
- Athoracophorus maculosus Burton, 1963
- Athoracophorus suteri Burton, 1963

== Description ==
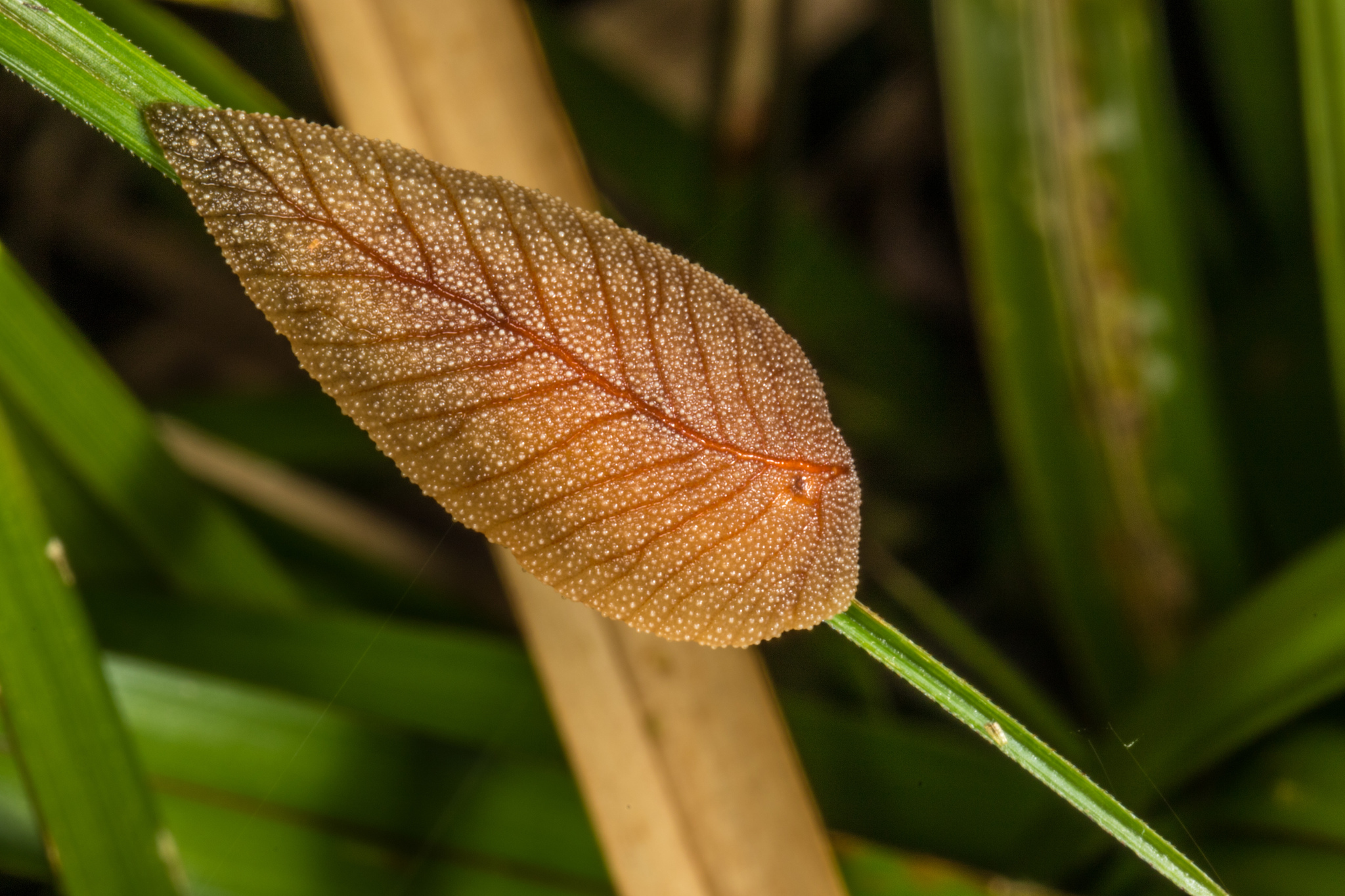
Athoracophorus

The body of the animal is limaciform, subcylindrical and tapering behind; inferior tentacles wanting. Mantle is anterior, small, triangular, lateral, adherent, enclosing the shell-plate. There are no longitudinal furrows above the margin of the foot, and no caudal mucous pit. There is no distinct locomotive disk. External respiratory and anal orifices are on the right central margin of the mantle. Orifice of the combined genital system is behind and below the right eye-peduncle.

The shell-plate is internal, flat, calcareous, oblong and sometimes in separate grains.

Jaw is smooth, with median projection and quadrate accessory plate.

Lingual membrane is with peculiarly shaped teeth, with long, narrow, curving, base of attachment, and low, transverse, multifid cusp.

The animal has peculiar dorsal grooves.
