= Aloïs Humbert =

Swiss naturalist

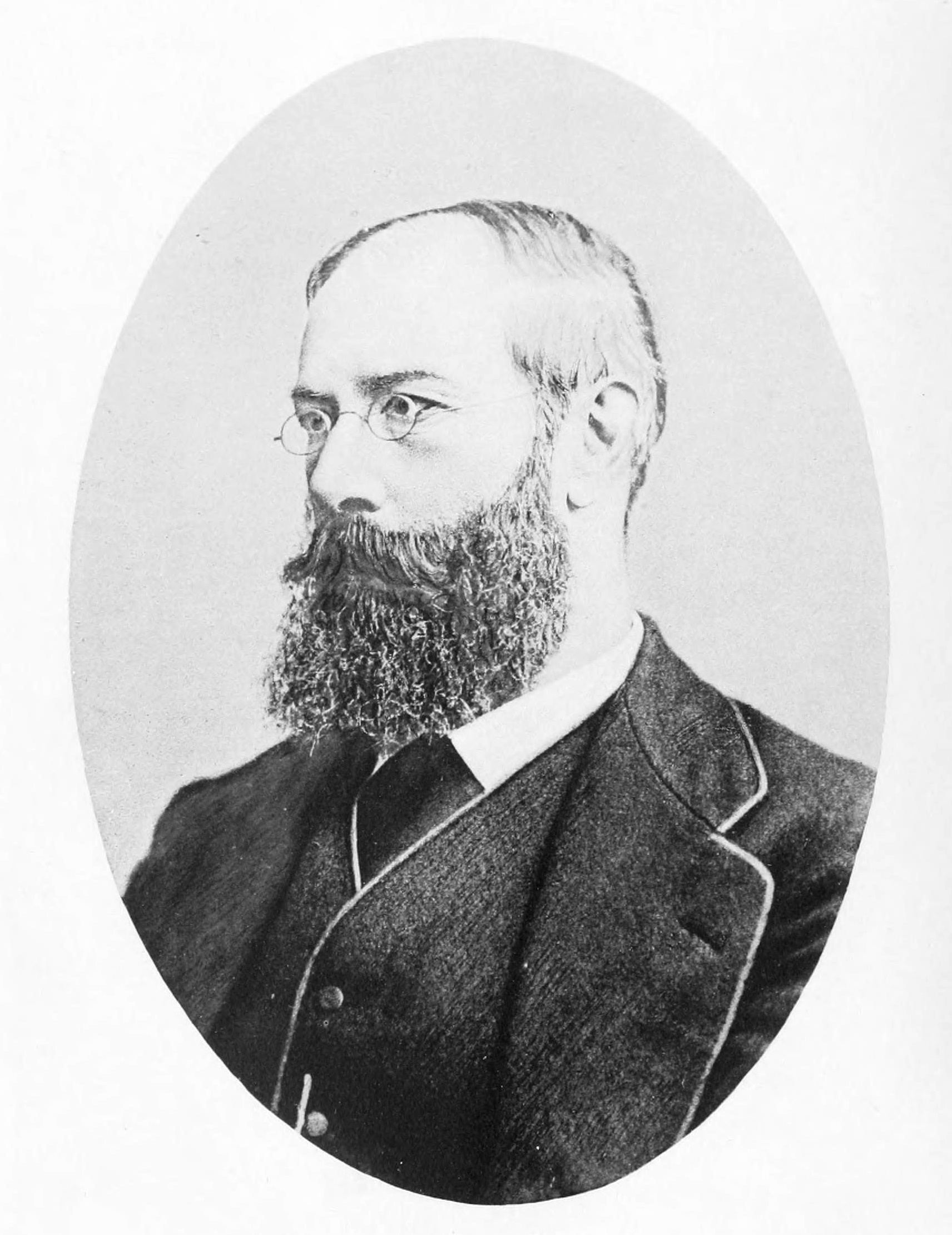
- Born: 22 September 1829; Geneva
- Died: 14 May 1887
- Occupations: Naturalist, paleontologist, zoologist, conservator-restorer

Aloïs Humbert (22 September 1829 – 13 May 1887) was a Swiss naturalist and paleontologist who specialized in the study of myriapods. He also described new vertebrates (fishes, reptiles, mammals), molluscs and flatworms.

== Biography ==
Humbert was born in Geneva on 22 September 1829, the son of Augustin Pyramus Humbert, a notary and politician, and Suzanne Charlotte Du Roveray. He studied natural sciences at the Academy of Geneva and at the University of Montpellier. In 1854, Humbert began working as a curator at the Natural History Museum of Geneva, where he worked closely with François Jules Pictet. He was involved in scientific missions to Ceylon and Lebanon; his work focused in particular on the fossils of Lebanon, the fauna of Ceylon, myriapods and geography. While in the Middle East, Humbert made important discoveries of fossil fish.

Humbert was appointed substitute teacher at the Academy of Geneva in 1864, the same year he married Jeanne Françoise Adélaïde Rochette, daughter of the Mayor of Bernex, Jean François Rochette. He worked on the catalogues of the Natural History Museum and the Bibliothèque de Genève. In 1876, on behalf of the recently founded Red Cross, Humbert organized a relief society for wounded soldiers in Montenegro during the Montenegrin–Ottoman War (1876–1878). He died in Onex on 13 May 1887, aged 57.

== Selected works ==
- Monographie des chéloniens de la mollasse suisse, 1856.
- Description de quelques espèces nouvelles de planaires terrestres de Ceylan, 1862 – Description of some new species of terrestrial planarians from Ceylon.
- Essai sur les myriapodes de Ceylan, 1865 – Essay on myriapods of Ceylon.
- Nouvelles recherches sur les poissons fossiles du Mont Liban, 1866 (with François Jules Pictet) – New research on fossil fish from Mount Lebanon.
- Description de divers myriapodes du Musée de Vienne, 1869 – Description of various myriapods at the Vienna Museum.
- Études sur les myriapodes et les insectes, 1870 (with Henri de Saussure) – Studies of myriapods and insects.
- Description du Niphargus puteanus var. Forelii, 1876 – On Niphargus puteanus.
- Myriapodes des environs de Genève, 1893 (posthumous release, published by Henri de Saussure) – Myriapods in the vicinity of Geneva.
