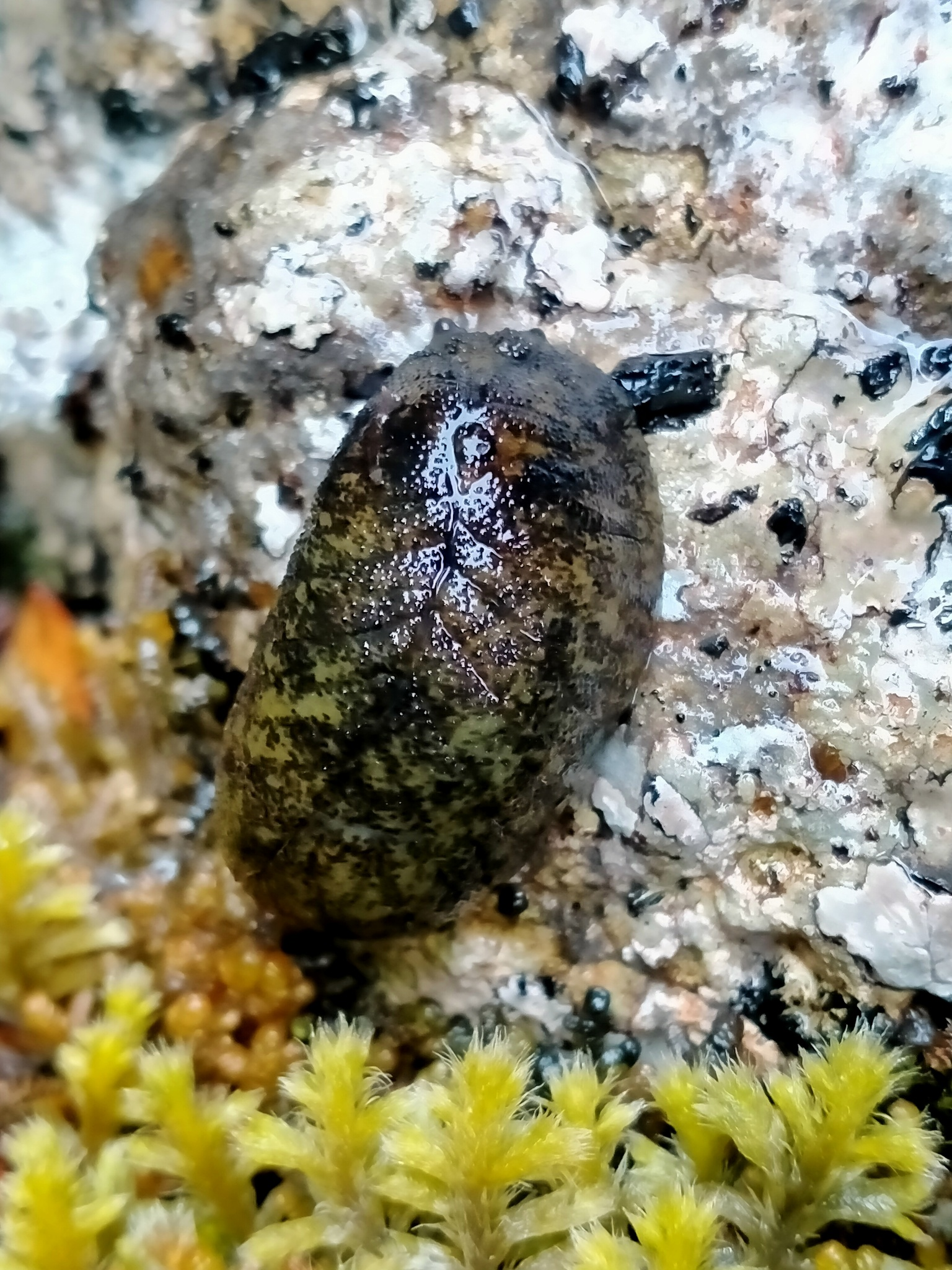
- Individual of a species of Athoracophorinae from Auckland Island observed in January 2023

Scientific classification
- Kingdom: Animalia
- Phylum: Mollusca
- Class: Gastropoda
- Order: Stylommatophora
- Family: Athoracophoridae
- Subfamily: Athoracophorinae; P. Fischer, 1883 (1860)

Synonyms
- Janellidae Gray, 1853

= Athoracophorinae =

Subfamily of gastropods

Athoracophorinae, common name the leaf-veined slugs, are a subfamily in the family Athoracophoridae, which are air-breathing, stalk-eyed land slugs, or terrestrial pulmonate gastropod mollusks. They are endemic to New Zealand, including its subantarctic islands.

== Distribution ==
Species in this subfamily are endemic to New Zealand, including its subantarctic islands.

== Taxonomy ==
Athoracophorinae is one of two subfamilies in the family Athoracophoridae, which in turn is the only family in the superfamily Athoracophoroidea. The following two subfamilies have been recognized in the taxonomy of Bouchet & Rocroi (2005), that follows the classification of Grimpe & Hoffmann (1925):

- Athoracophorinae P. Fischer, 1883 (1860) - synonym: Janellidae Gray, 1853 (inv.), found in New Zealand, including its subantarctic islands.
- Aneitinae Gray, 1860, found in eastern Australia, New Guinea (including the Bismarck Archipelago and Admiralty Islands), Vanauatu, and New Caledonia.

=== Genera ===
Genera within the subfamily Athoracophorinae include:

- Athoracophorus Gould, 1852
- Palliopodex Burton, 1963
- Pseudaneitea Cockerell, 1891
