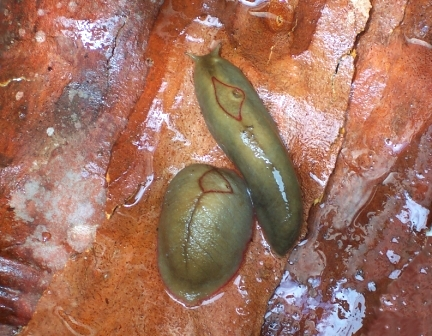
- Two individuals of Triboniophorus graeffei

Scientific classification
- Kingdom: Animalia
- Phylum: Mollusca
- Class: Gastropoda
- Order: Stylommatophora
- Superfamily: Athoracophoroidea; P. Fischer, 1883 (1860)
- Family: Athoracophoridae; P. Fischer, 1883 (1860)

Subfamilies
- Athoracophorinae P. Fischer, 1883 (1860); Aneitinae Gray, 1860

= Athoracophoridae =

Family of gastropods

Athoracophoridae, common name the leaf-veined slugs, are a family of air-breathing land slugs, terrestrial pulmonate gastropod mollusks in the order Stylommatophora, the stalk-eyed snails and slugs. Many of the species have an attractive pattern on their dorsal surface which resembles the veins in a leaf, hence the common name.

Athoracophoridae is the only family in the superfamily Athoracophoroidea.

Leaf-veined slugs live on the various land masses and islands in the south-west Pacific area. In te reo Māori, leaf-veined slugs are known as putoko ropiropi.

The scientific name Athoracophoridae is derived from prefix "a-", that means "without" and from a Greek word "θωραχοφὁρος" (thorachoforos), that means "breastplate". This is a reference to the fact that the mantle in these slugs is small and not well delineated; it does not have the obvious, saddle-shaped or breast-plate-shaped appearance that it does in most other land slug groups.

== Anatomy ==
In the family Athoracophoridae (in subfamily Aneitinae and in subfamily Athoracophorinae), the number of haploid chromosomes lies between 36 and 45 (according to the values in this table). While they belong to the pulmonate snails, they lack a true lung. The vascularized mantle cavity is reduced, and a series of blind tubules radiate from it, being surrounded blood vessels. This allows for a more compact lung structure in these generally flat animals.

== Distribution ==
Species in this family are found in eastern Australia, New Zealand including its sub-Antarctic islands, Bismarck Archipelago, the Admiralty Islands, the New Hebrides, New Caledonia, as well as on the Melanesian islands north to New Caledonia and New Britain, Papua New Guinea.

== Taxonomy ==
The name Athoracophoridae has precedence over the name Aneitidae, because Athoracophoridae is in prevailing usage. In 2018 a nomenclatural and type catalogue for this family was published.

The following two subfamilies have been recognized in the taxonomy of Bouchet & Rocroi (2005), that follows classification after Grimpe & Hoffmann (1925):

- Athoracophorinae P. Fischer, 1883 (1860) - synonym: Janellidae Gray, 1853 (inv.) - a subantarctic subfamily
- Aneitinae Gray, 1860 - a northern subfamily

=== Genera ===
Genera within the family Athoracophoridae include:

- Aneitea Gray, 1860
  - Aneitea sarasini
- Athoracophorus Gould, 1852 - the type genus, 3 species
- Palliopodex Burton, 1963 - with the only species Palliopodex verrucosus (Simroth, 1889)
- Pseudaneitea Cockerell, 1891
- Reflectopallium Burton, 1963
- Triboniophorus Humbert, 1863

== See also ==
- Alaninema ngata, a nematode which is an intestinal parasite in slugs of this family
