= Byng, New South Wales =

Locality and ghost town, in New South Wales, Australia

Byng
- Town
- Coordinates: 33°21′03.8″S 149°15′15.8″E
- Country: Australia
- State: New South Wales
- Region: Central West
- LGA: Cabonne Council
- Location: 242 km (150 mi) WNW of Sydney; 43 km (27 mi) WNW of Bathurst; 25 km (16 mi) ESE of Orange

Government
  - State electorate: Orange
  - Federal division: Calare
- Elevation: 866 m (2,841 ft)

Population
  - Total: 297 (2021 census)
- Postcode: 2800
- County: Bathurst County
- Parish: Byng
Localities around Byng
Emu Swamp	Lewis Ponds	Freemantle
Lucknow	Byng	Rock Forest
Shadforth	Guyong	Vittoria

Byng, New South Wales is a locality in Central West region of New South Wales, Australia. There was once a village of the same name, now a ghost town, although its church and cemetery still exist. An earlier settler's name of the locality was Cornish Settlement. The locality was a site of mining for copper and gold, and has associations with the discovery of the payable gold in Australia, at Ophir during 1851.

== Location and name ==
The area now known as Byng lies on traditional lands of Wiradjuri people.

Byng lies between Bathurst and Orange, to the east of Lucknow. The site of the village lay between Lewis Ponds Creek—a left bank tributary of Macquarie River—and its tributary Sheep Station Creek, south of the confluence of the two creeks.

The settlement was first known as 'Cornish Settlement', a name given to it by surveyor James Richards around 1838. Around 1854 it was renamed Byng—also the name of the cadestral parish—after the ill-fated Admiral John Byng. The original name Cornish Settlement, also remained in use during the 19th Century.

== History ==
=== Wiradjuri conflict with colonists and dispossession ===
One of the most numerous of Aboriginal peoples, with vast traditional lands, the Wiradjuri were better placed to resist colonial settlement than those closer to the coast. They also had more time to prepare, as colonial settlement west of the Blue Mountains only became possible with the first crossing of those mountains in 1813. Under Governor Macquarie's rule, settlement proceeded slowly, and the Wiradjuri tolerated some encroachment onto their lands, such as a settlement of around 120 colonists at Bathurst.

The pace of settlement greatly increased, under Governor Thomas Brisbane, which led to the Bathurst War of 1824. For a time, some settlers were driven back off some of the Wiradjuri's land. The Wiradjuri sought peace, in December 1824. A prominent leader of the Wiradjuri warriors, Windradyne, died in 1835.

Surveying of the land in the area around what is now Orange began in 1828, and colonial settlement resumed. Governor Ralph Darling made grants of freehold land to colonists, extinguishing what later became known as native title.

=== Cornish Settlement ===
==== Colonial settlers ====
The first colonial settlers in what is now known as Byng were a Cornishman, William 'Parson' Tom (1791—1883), his Devon-born wife Ann (nee Lane) (1796—1870), their children, a nephew, and Ann's brother, William Lane (1793—1855). They had migrated from Cornwall, England, in the ship, Belinda, in 1823, and one of their sons, William Tom (1823—1904), was born at sea. They farmed elsewhere in the colony, before William 'Parson' Tom took up a 640 acre land grant that he named Springfield, in 1829 or 1830.

Springfield is around the confluence of Sheep Station Creek and Lewis Ponds Creek. Tom first built a wattle and daub cottage there, now gone. In 1854 he built the two storey stone house that still stands. An inscription on three stones set into the paving outside the front door of the house reads, Cead mile failte, Gaelic words (Céad mile fáilte) meaning 'a hundred thousand welcomes'.

Over the years, 'Parson' Tom and his sons acquired a number of properties in the areas around the Lachlan. They were among the first to send cattle overland to sell to settlers in the newer settlements in Gippsland and Port Phillip. Only Tom's later involvement in copper mining was to curtail the growth of the family's wealth. In 1967, a reunion of 'Parson' Tom's descendants was attended by over 200 of an estimated 530 descendants.

Other settlers took up land south from Springfield. Springfield became the nucleus of what became known as 'Cornish Settlement'. Other families from Cornwall or Devon who settled in the area were those of George Hawke (1802—1882)—he originally arrived as tutor to William Tom's children— Richard Lane (1789—1875)—Ann Tom's brother— and John Glasson (1803—1890). Hawke built his house, Pendarves, and Glasson built Bookanan. Hawke and Glasson, in partnership, supplied nearby towns with produce, including beer and ales. Hawke attempted fruit growing, but with little success, and he is responsible for introducing and propagating the hawthorn bush, now widespread in the area.

These early settlers were able to use assigned men, convict labour allocated to settlers for the cost of their upkeep. Men received accommodation, a weekly food ration, and a yearly issue of clothing and footwear. Well-behaved men could be rewarded with additional food rations. The Wesleyan settlers were good employers and generally well-regarded by their assigned men, whom they referred to as 'assigned servants' not 'convicts'. The men generally worked with little direct supervision. George Hawke paid his men a small weekly bonus, so that they may have at least some savings when their sentence was completed.

==== Religious observance ====
William 'Parson' Tom was a Wesleyan lay preacher. A rocky outcrop, above the left bank of Sheep Station Creek, which became known as Bethel Rock, was the first site of Wesleyan worship in the area. When Tom's first house at Springfield was completed, services were held there. In 1842, a rubble-stone chapel was built, which had an adjacent cemetery. That chapel—the first of two at Byng—stood on land between Sheep Station and Lewis Ponds Creeks, east of Bethel Rock and to the north of the later cemetery. It was the first Wesleyan chapel west of Bathurst.

=== Early copper mining ===
The economy of Cornish Settlement was based only upon agriculture, up to the late 1840s. During the 1840s, copper ore deposits had been found at various Central West localities, including at Copper Hill (near Molong), Rockley, Lipscombe Pools Creek (near Canowindra) and at Coombing Park, near Carcoar.

In January 1849, John Glasson's brother-in-law, John Lane, found copper ore on Richard Lane's land at the Cornish Settlement, alongside Sheep Station Creek. The deposit was found to extend northward onto the neighbouring land owned by Glasson. In August 1849, the two landowners employed a 'mine captain' to oversee around six miners. A letter to the Bathurst Advocate, dated 20 September 1849, stated that copper mining at Cornish Settlement had been underway for "not above a month" by then.

Glasson's mine had but one shaft—originally known as Maker's shaft—the Carangerra or Carangera, later the name of the mine. Lane's mine further to the south had four shafts, each named after four of his earliest miners, Rose, Tucker, Jenkins and Weeks. Both Glasson and Lane worked their mines, under tribute mining agreements, a traditional Cornish mining industry practice. The 'tribute' that the miners received was a share of six to ten tons of every twenty tons of ore that they extracted from the mine, but they were paid no wages.

During his three-and-a-half year long survey of the colony, first Geological Surveyor of New South Wales, Samuel Stutchbury (1798–1859), made a report on the deposits and the mine workings at the Cornish Settlement, which was published as a brief letter to the Sydney Morning Herald, in February 1852. His report gave the relative position and extent of progress on all five of the shafts at Cornish Settlement. He described a deposit, consisting of oxidised (oxide and carbonate) and sulphide zones, as follows, "ores above the ten fathom [60 foot] level are similar to those described as occurring in the Coombing mine, and may be considered as 'Gossan' ores—below this depth the yellow sulphurets of copper commence, with much 'Mundic' or sulpheret of iron." Stuchbury apparently missed the potentially auriferous (gold-bearing) nature of the deposit, something that became important later.

In April 1850, Glasson and Lane engaged Robert Cocks, who had been in charge of the Rosemorrin Smelting Works, at what is now Woolwich, to erect a smelter, close to Lewis Pond Creek, near Booknan. Most copper smelters of the era used reverberatory furnaces—such a those later extensively built by Lewis Lloyd— but Cocks erected two small furnaces that were a type of blast furnace. It was intended to operate one furnace at a time, alternately.

The smelter was described as follows in December 1850, "The buildings consist of an engine-house, a shed adjoining to screen the fan-wheel belts, a building for the casting, and a charcoal shed. There are also two blast furnaces, surrounded by a strongly built stage, elevated to a convenient height, the floor of which receives the ore and fuel, and from which the furnaces are charged. The charging is greatly facilitated by a level contiguous to the stage, where the ore. is deposited and can be mixed beforehand with the requisite materials for fluxing., These works, though on a small scale, are, in point of design and convenience, highly creditable to the scientific and practical knowledge of Mr. Cock. [sic] In a word they are an example of economy and efficiency combined. The engine, which of four horse power, is a good piece of workmanship, and works very well." "This engine drives a powerful eccentric fan three feet six inches in diameter. The fan is constructed on a new principle, and performs twelve hundred revolutions per minute. The engine would with ease drive two of them. The air is conveyed to the furnaces by means of brick drains, passing under the furnaces, and is conducted into each of them through three cast-iron tuyer [sic] pipes. No two pipes are exactly opposite to each other, consequently the air is equally distributed to the furnaces"

The furnaces were intended to use charcoal, but ended up being charged with wood instead. The ore was first roasted or 'calcinated' (oxidized) in the open air—stacks made of layers of wood and ore were burned, until the sulphur and arsenic content of the ore had been lowered—prior to smelting, and then smelted to produce copper ingots. The blast furnaces were reducing the 'calcinated' ore to copper metal; that is opposed to the later use of specialised blast furnaces (water jacket furnaces) in which sulphide ore was oxidised to produce a copper matte. The smelters needed one fireman and five men tending the furnace when in operation, aside from Cocks, who was in charge.

The copper ingots that the furnaces made at Cornish Settlement were estimated to be 95% copper, described as "copper nearly pure, and containing no metallic iron, but a small portion of oxides of iron diffused through the metal". However, the smelting process was not efficient, and, at least initially, for every two tons of copper produced, another two-and-a-half tons was lost in the slag. Nonetheless, the smelter sent a bullock dray carrying its first batch of 132 ingots—weighing around 40 lbs each—to Sydney, where they were successfully sold at auction for £75 15s. The shipment of copper ingots, about two tons of copper, passed through Bathurst, on 1 January 1851, and it was observed that "the public became excited at the appearance of the glistening bars". The driver delayed the journey at Bathurst, for a day, so that all who wished to inspect the copper could do so. Glasson also sold some untreated ore, and the partners considered sending the remaining ore to be smelted elsewhere.

The gold rush of May 1851 had a disastrous effect on the copper mines at Cornish Settlement 1851; by 13 May 1851, all the miners at Carangara Mine had deserted for the nearby goldfield at Ophir. Consequently, the mining and smelting operations came to an end in May 1851. The copper mining venture had yet to become profitable; after deducting the tribute for the miners, the two partners were each still £500 short of recovering their own share of the cost of the smelter and its engine.

A company, Carangara Copper Mining Company, was formed by Sydney businessmen and politicians, George Allen, John Alexander, John Fairfax, Samuel Hebblewhite, and David Jones. The company had capital of £50,000, in 10,000 shares of £5 each. It was incorporated in 1854. The former mine owners, Glasson and Lane, were to receive a 10% commission on all profits, and the new company leased part of their land. John Glasson, his wife, and a son, migrated to Papakura, New Zealand in 1857, although some of his family remained in the area. The early years of copper mining were over.

=== Discovery of the first payable gold field ===
==== The search for gold (January to May 1851) ====
Edward Hammond Hargraves (1816 – 1891)—long publicly recognised as the discoverer of gold in Australia—had been an unsuccessful miner in the Calfornian gold rush. While in California, he noted the similarity of the gold bearing country there to the landscape around Bathurst, where he had worked for a time in his youth. Upon is return to Australia, in January 1851, he set out to find gold, hoping that he would be rewarded for making such a find. In fact, small finds of gold had been made, as far back as 1823, something Hargraves apparently already knew.

In early February 1851, Hargraves was passing through the district, following a plan to find the source of gold found by a shepherd, Hugh McGregor, near Wellington, in 1843. McGregor had taken around £200 worth of gold from around a quartz reef outcrop, in the locality now known as Bodangora, then called Mitchells Creek, and had quietly sold it to jewellers in Sydney.

When he saw promising specimens of quartz at an inn at Guyong, a locality directly south of the Cornish Settlement, Hargraves decided to look for gold in the surrounding area, instead of continuing to Wellington. At the inn, he met John Lister (1822 — 1890). Lister guided him to Lewis Ponds Creek, heading for the junction with Summerhill Creek ('Yorkey's Corner'), where a shepherd nicknamed 'Yorkey' had found a nugget in 1847.

To avoid the chance that 'Yorkey' would suspect their motives, Hargraves insisted that they camp at a location known as Radigan's Gully, about 4 kilometers upstream of the confluence with Summerhill Creek. It was there, on 12 February 1851, that Hargraves washed some surface material in a gold pan, finding 'colour'—fine grained gold particles—but nothing that would justify alluvial gold mining.

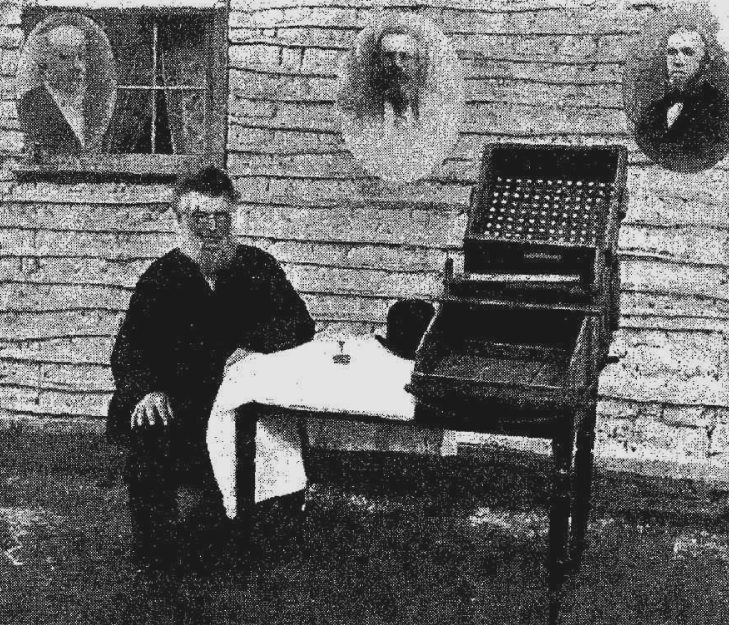
Willliam Tom, Jnr. with the gold cradle (atop a table) that he made to Hargraves design, and then was used to make the payable gold discovery at Ophir. Inset at top, left to right, are Hargraves, Lister and James Tom.

Hargraves then formed a prospecting party with John Lister, and Lister's friend, James Tom (1822–1898), a son of William 'Parson' Tom of Springfield. He also taught them how to build a gold cradle. William Tom, Jnr, (1823–1904), James Tom's brother, joined the group, and he built the cradle using leftover red cedar timber from the new house being constructed at Springfield.

During February 1851, Hargraves demonstrated gold cradling to the three at Cornish Settlement, at the junction of Sheep Station and Lewis Ponds Creek. Hargreaves and John Lister then went prospecting elsewhere, as Hargraves followed an indirect route back to Sydney. Meanwhile the brothers, William, James, and Henry Tom, spent three days, during March 1851, prospecting, for a return of a mere 16 grains of gold, and duly informed Hargraves by letter.

Hargraves arrived in Sydney on 22 March 1851. He had to wait until 1 April 1851, to see the Colonial Secretary, Edward Deas Thompson, about a reward for finding gold. By then, Hargraves knew of the 16 grains of gold found by the Tom brothers, but was only in possession of the 'colours' that he found in February. Deas Thompson would later recall, during a public speech in February 1853, that he had been showed some specks of gold "so minute that [he] needed the aid of a glass to examine them".

William Tom and John Lister—James Tom was away to take delivery of cattle on the Bogan—continued to prospect in the area, and found payable gold, using the cradle, near the junction of Summerhill Creek and Lewis Ponds Creek, between 7 and 12 April 1851.

Upon their return to Springfield, the sight of the gold led 'Parson' Tom to exclaim, "And they came to Ophir and fetched from thence gold" (quoting, 1 Kings, 9:28.), effectively giving the discovery site (until then known as 'Yorkey's Corner') a new name, Ophir. He implored his sons to keep the discovery secret for fear of the effects of a gold rush on the agricultural economy.

The Tom brothers and Lister kept the discovery secret, but honouring their agreement with Hargraves, Lister sent a letter on 24 April 1851, advising the find of over four ounces. Edward Hargraves rushed the letter to Deas Thompson, claiming, for himself, the reward for discovering payable gold. He used the date that he had first found the 'colours' of gold, 12 February 1851, as the date of his 'discovery'.

It was on 2 May 1851, that news of gold at Ophir became public knowledge—by Hargraves attempting to further substantiate his claim to a reward, through an article in the Sydney Morning Herald—triggering the New South Wales gold rush. By 25 May 1851, the Geological Surveyor, Samuel Stuchbury, estimated that there were over 1,000 men seeking gold at Ophir, including all the miners from the Carangara Mine at Cornish Settlement.

==== Aftermath (1852 — 1890) ====
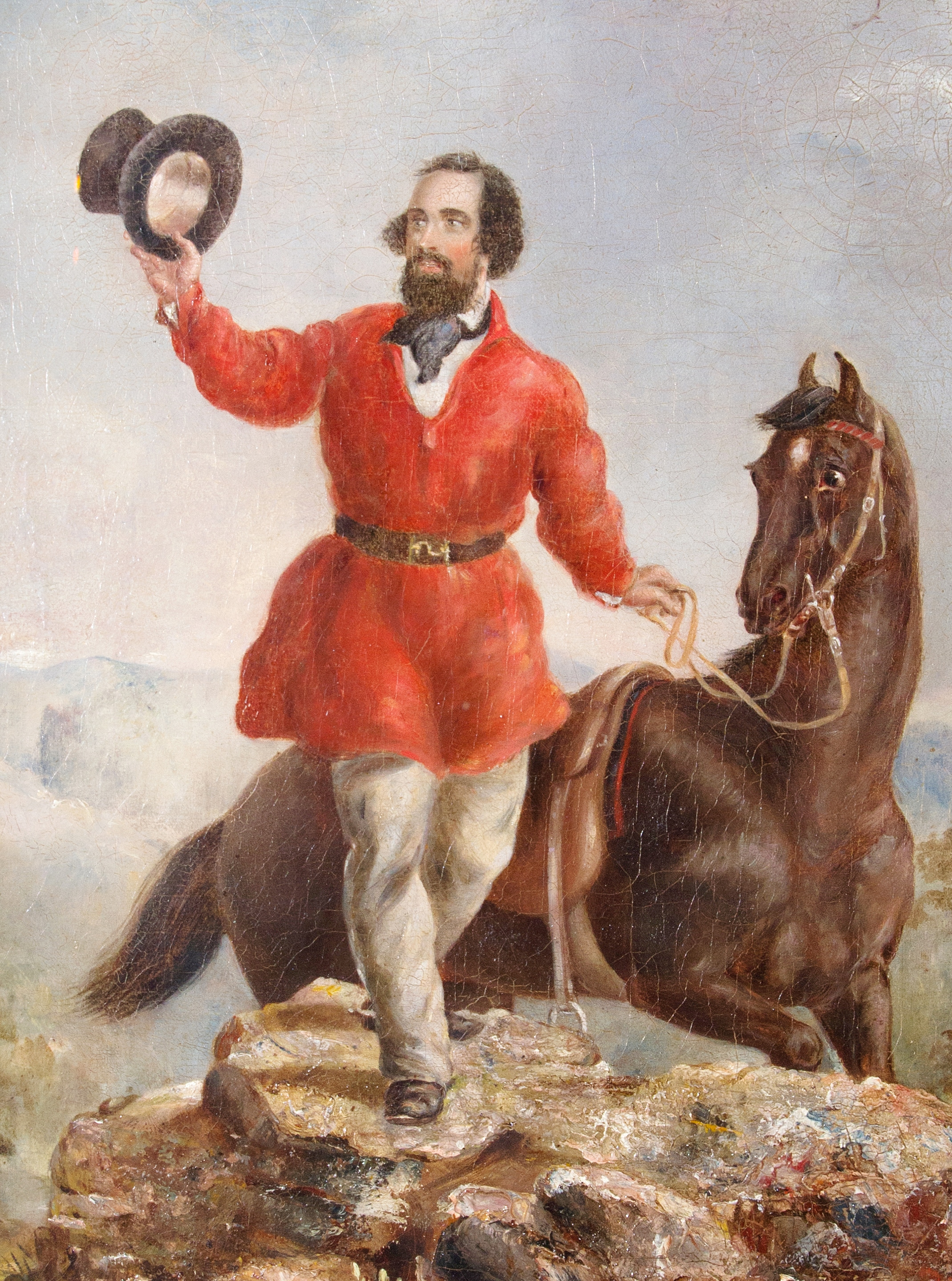
Fanciful representation of Hargraves, as discoverer of gold, returning the salute of the grateful gold miners (Artist: Thomas Tyrwhitt Balcombe)

In 1853, Hargraves was paid a reward of £5,000, which he regarded as insufficient, and it was later supplemented by another £5,000. He also managed to claim that his 'discovery' had led to the Victorian gold rush, and was promised another £5,000 by the newly-established Victorian government, eventually receiving £2,381. He was appointed as a Commissioner for Crown Lands, in which he toured parts of New South Wales, pronouncing upon their suitability, as prospects for gold mining.

Although some almost immediately took dispute over Hargraves claim to be the first to find gold, the economic boom and increased immigration caused by the gold rush, soon made Hargraves a widely-admired public figure. In February 1853, Hargraves was lauded at a public dinner held to commemorate the second anniversary of the gold discovery. In 1853-54, he visited England, and was presented to Queen Victoria, as the discoverer of gold. In 1857, he built a fine house, known as 'Noraville'.

The two Tom brothers and John Lister had received a combined reward of £1,000. The same amount was given to the geologist, Rev. William Branwhite Clarke, who had predicted that the country was auriferous, and who claimed to have known of the existence of gold, as early as 1841.

In his own version of events, Hargraves, minimised the role of the other three men; Lister was referred to only as his "guide". When Lister and the Tom brothers objected to Hargraves' claims to be sole 'discoverer of gold', Hargraves took the high moral ground, arguing that he had only set out to discover gold—as if for some greater good—but not to 'soil his hands digging for it'; apparently ignoring that without the efforts of the other three men he would have had no proof of payable gold.

The dispute turned nasty; James Tom successfully sued Hargraves for libel in 1854, but was unsuccessful in another libel case against Hawkesley and Williamson—the proprietors and publishers of The People's Advocate and New South Wales Vindicator—over that newspaper's article titled "Lister and his Tom Toms".

There ensued a lengthy public dispute for equal recognition of the discoverers of payable gold in New South Wales. Hargraves wrote a book on the subject, Australia and its Goldfields, published in 1855—probably using a ghost writer—but that did not stop Lister and the Toms continuing to petition parliament and write letters and pamphlets in support of their argument.

Hargraves, however, continued to prosper. Around 1863, the mining settlement of Louisa Creek was renamed Hargraves. In 1877, Hargraves was given an annual pension of £250, by the New South Wales Government. In 1881, he addressed Victorian legislators, with his aim being to increase his reward payment. And, he was using the post-nominal, F.G.S., indicating that he had been made a Fellow of the Geological Society of London.

Eventually, in 1890, a select committee of the NSW Legislative Assembly recognised Lister and the two Tom brothers as discoverers—albeit after many years of Hargraves being honoured alone—concluding that "Messrs Tom and Lister were undoubtedly the first discoverers of gold obtained in Australia in payable quantity". John Lister had died, on the very day that the select committee had begun its deliberations.

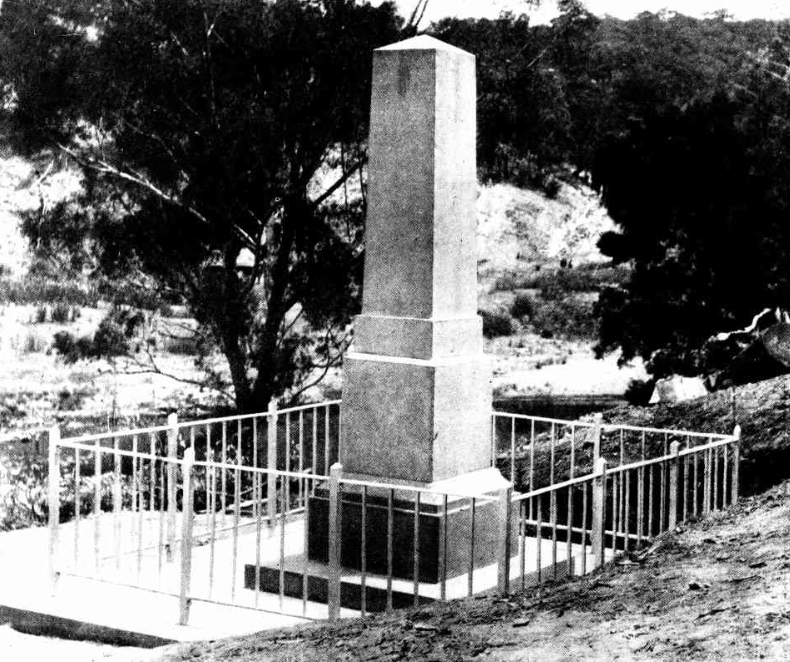
Obelisk at Ophir.

==== Monument at Ophir ====
The inscription on the monumental obelisk commemorating the 1851 gold discovery, located near the junction of Lewis Ponds Creek and Summer Hill Creek, at Ophir, succinctly states the accepted account of the events during the period from February to April, 1851; it reads, "This obelisk was erected by the New South Wales Government to commemorate the first discovery in Australia of payable gold, which was found in the creek in front of this monument. Those responsible for the discovery were:—Edward Hammond Hargraves, John Hardman Australia Lister, James Tom, William Tom. From experience gained in California, Hargraves formed the idea that the district was auriferous, and he found the first gold on 12th February, 1851, about two miles up Lewis Pond Creek. He explained to the others how to prospect and use a miner's cradle, and Lister and W. Tom found payable gold between 7th and 12th April, 1851."

=== The village of Byng ===
In the early days of copper mining, the population of the area known as Cornish Settlement grew to around 200, boosted by the influx many of the mainly Cornish miners; many of the miners were living in tents and crude huts, along the banks of Sheep Station Creek. The creek had to be dammed to provide them with water.

In 1852, Governor Fitzroy approved the reservation of land for a new Wesleyan chapel, school, cemetery. A village—as yet unnamed—was laid out in the same year. However, the population of mine workers had already been drastically reduced, after gold had been found at Ophir, in May 1851.

The incorporation of a new mining company in 1854 meant work in the mines would resume. In 1855 and 1856, suburban allotments—in the Village of Byng—were put up for sale, but some of the same allotments were offered for sale again in 1857, and in 1858. George Hawke opened a store there.

The village only began to have more of a permanent nature in the 1870s. The main employer was the Carangara copper mine. The new Wesleyan chapel opened in 1873. Byng had a public school, from July 1874. A reservation of a site for the public school in 1878, indicates that the school may have moved from its original site. Byng had a post office from 1873, and in 1875 there was also a butcher's shop and a brewery. The post office seems to have closed briefly, because it reopened in 1878. There were also houses in the village.

In April 1893, the area of the village and some other adjoining land was proclaimed as the Byng Gold-Field, essentially preventing the sale of any further land in the village. Over the following years, the reservation of these lands was gradually revoked.

There was some gold being won at Byng, albeit on a small and declining scale, as late as 1932. After the end of mining and with better transport to larger settlements, inevitably the small village declined. The post office at Byng closed in 1931, and the school closed in December 1958. The reservation of the school's site had already been revoked in 1957. The last of its public buildings was its church, but over time that too fell into disuse; it still stands, and it was restored, in 1988, as an Australian Bicentenniary project.

The Village of Byng officially ceased to exist, in March 1975, when it was redesignated as a locality, under the Geographical Names Act.

=== Byng residents' involvement in copper mining at Cadia ===
William 'Parson' Tom, George Hawke, and Richard Lane, all of Byng, were involved in the Canoblas Copper Company's copper mine at East Cadia, perhaps as early as 1855, but certainly by 1859.

John Penrose Christo, a Welsh-born smelter manager, had been managing the Carangara Mine, at Byng, in 1860. By 1862, he was in charge of the copper mine at Cadia, and others from the Carangara Mine followed him there.

=== Later copper and gold mining at Byng ===
==== Copper mining ====
With the incorporation of the Carangara Copper Mining Company, in 1854, the era of mining by companies at Byng began. The mine was worked for copper, until around 1881, although a prospectus for a new company, New Carangara Copper Mining Company, was issued in 1865. Copper ore from the mine was exhibited at the Paris Exhibition of 1855 and at the Philadelphia Exhibition of 1876. In 1872, the mine produced 784 tons of smelted copper.

Although the Carangara Mine was the main copper mine at Byng, other mines existed there. To the north of the Carangara Mine, was the Knob Copper Mine, to the west of the village, the Hawk's Nest Copper Mine, Thunder Castle Copper Mine, and Oaky Smith Copper Mine.

The last copper mine to open was the Diamond Hill copper mine, which existed from around 1901. It also produced some gold and silver. Although the mine was associated with Byng, it lay outside the boundaries of the modern-day locality, to its south, on higher land, near the headwaters of Sheep Station Creek. There was mining activity in the same area during 1915.

There was a huge slump in the price of copper, after the end of the First World War in 1918. During the war, copper was £135 per ton, falling to £122 after the Armistice, and by March 1919 to £78, with the prospect of a further decline. At the prevailing copper prices, there would be no more copper mining around Byng.

==== Gold mining ====
The presence of gold had been noticed in the Carangara Copper Mine in 1872. It has also been reported that the copper ingots produced at that mine, in 1851, contained a significant gold content. However, before electrolytic refining of copper, it was difficult to recover such gold. Neighbouring Lucknow hosted significant quartz reef gold mines, Wentworth and Reform Gold Mines, and some noted the geological similarity of Lucknow to Byng.

In 1886, renewed interest in gold and silver, led to a new company taking over the mine site, immediately finding some rich specimens of reef gold. Nonetheless, gold mining came relatively late to Byng. In April 1893, the area of the village and some other adjoining land was proclaimed as the Byng Gold-Field.

In February 1894, it was reported that gold-bearing quartz and pyrites had been found, returning 14 ounces 16 dwts from 25 cwt of stone, on the land of the old Carangara copper mine. In 1897, a copper deposit was being worked on the Carangara mine land, under a tribute mining arrangement, and gold bearing quartz up to 16 ounces per ton was reported. The Carangara mine was not worked after 1901, and its mining leases, freehold land and machinery were put up for sale by auction, in August of that year.

The Whitney Green mine was located to the east of the junction of Sheep Station Creek and Lewis Ponds Creek. In 1895, a crushing of ten tons of stone from the mine produced around 222 ounces of gold. it employed 20 men in 1897.

There was some gold being won at Byng, albeit on a small and declining scale, as late as 1932.

==== Other minerals ====
Asbestos occurs in the area, but was never commercially exploited.

== Present day Byng ==
Byng is a quiet rural locality, off the main roads, with grazing the main occupation. The area is greatly altered from the times when it was only populated by the Wiradjuri. The cleared land, many exotic trees, and stands of hawthorn hedges are legacies of the early colonists in the area. Some disturbance due to mining is apparent in aerial views of the former site of the Carangara Mine.

The streets of the erstwhile village have long since been closed, now lie on private land, and have all but disappeared. The large houses built by the early settlers—'Parson' Tom's Springfield, George Hawke's Pendarves, and John Glasson's Bookanan—survive but are also inaccessible on private land.

There is a memorial at Bethel Rock, unveiled in 1932. Only the foundations and some rubble remain of the first chapel. It too is marked by a memorial tablet. Nearby is an old graveyard, which still has four standing headstones, with four others at its corners. Six identifiable burials there date from the late 1840s to 1851. Further south is the Wesleyan chapel (now Uniting church), now only used on special occasions. Across the road and to the north-east of the church, is the later graveyard containing at least 174 burials. One buried there is William 'Parson' Tom, founding pioneer of what is now Byng, and another is his son, also William Tom, one of the discoverers of the first payable gold field, at Ophir.

== Literature on Byng ==
- Hannah Truscott Glasson memoirs, 1845-1922, written 1916-1922 with related papers, 1783-1864 (Collection of State Library of NSW)
- The Cornish Settlement, a book with text by John Rule with drawings by Liina Truu (1978)
- Road to Byng, a book by Yvonne McBurney, including correspondence of George Hawke (1802—1882)
