= John Alexander =

John Alexander may refer to the following people:

== Arts and entertainment ==
- John Alexander (actor) (1897–1982), American stage and film actor
- John Alexander (director), British television director
- John Alexander (painter) (1686–c. 1766), Scottish historical painter and engraver
- John Alexander (tenor) (1923–1990), opera tenor
- John Marshall Alexander Jr., birthname of American singer Johnny Ace (1929–1954)
- John White Alexander (1856–1915), American painter
- John Alexander (artist) (born 1945), American artist

== Politics ==
- John Alexander (councillor) (born 1988), Scottish National Party politician from Dundee, Scotland
- John Alexander (Ohio politician) (1777–1848), U.S. Representative from Ohio
- John Alexander (MP) (1802–1885), Irish member of the UK Parliament (1853–1859) for Carlow Borough
- John M. Alexander Jr. (born 1949), member of the North Carolina Senate
- John G. Alexander (1893–1971), U.S. Representative from Minnesota
- John Alexander (Australian politician) (born 1951), member of the Australian House of Representatives
- John Alexander (New Zealand politician) (1876–1941), member of the New Zealand Legislative Council, 1934–1941
- John Alexander (New South Wales colonial politician), member of the New South Wales Legislative Council
- John D. Alexander (politician) (1903–1994), Canadian politician
- John Alexander Calder, Canadian politician

== Military ==
- John B. Alexander (born 1937), retired US Army colonel and leading advocate for the development of non-lethal weapons
- John Alexander (VC) (died 1857), Irish recipient of the Victoria Cross
- John Hanks Alexander (1864–1894), African American officer in the US armed forces
- John D. Alexander (admiral) (born 1959), U.S. Navy admiral

== Religion ==
- John Alexander (bishop) (1694–1776), Scottish Episcopal Bishop of Dunkeld
- John Alexander (Presbyterian minister) (1686–1743), minister and patristic commentator
- John Alexander (nonconformist minister) (1736–1765), scriptural commentator
- John Alexander (priest) (1833–1908), Dean of Ferns, 1899–1908

== Sports ==
- John Alexander (linebacker) (1896–1986), American football player
- John Alexander (defensive end) (born 1955), American football player
- John Alexander (racing driver) (born 1954), American race car driver
- John Alexander (tennis) (born 1951), Australian tennis player, commentator, and politician
- John Alexander (footballer, born 1955) (born 1955), English former footballer and Manchester United club secretary
- John Alexander (footballer, born 1985) (born 1985), English football forward for Darlington and many non-league clubs

== Others ==
- John Henry Alexander (1812–1867), scientist and president of Georges Creek Coal & Iron Co.
- John Alexander (chief clerk) (1830–1916), chief clerk to Bow Street Magistrates' Court, editor of The Police Gazette
- John Amyas Alexander (1922–2010), archaeologist at St John's College, Cambridge
- John Alexander (doctor) (died 1901), medical health officer

== See also ==
- Alexander John (disambiguation)
- Jonathan Alexander (born 1967), American rhetorician and memoirist
