= John D. Alexander =

John D. Alexander may refer to:

- John D. Alexander (politician) (1903–1994), Canadian politician
- John D. Alexander (admiral) (born 1959), U.S. Navy admiral

== See also ==
- John Alexander (disambiguation)
