= Wentworth and Reform Gold Mines =

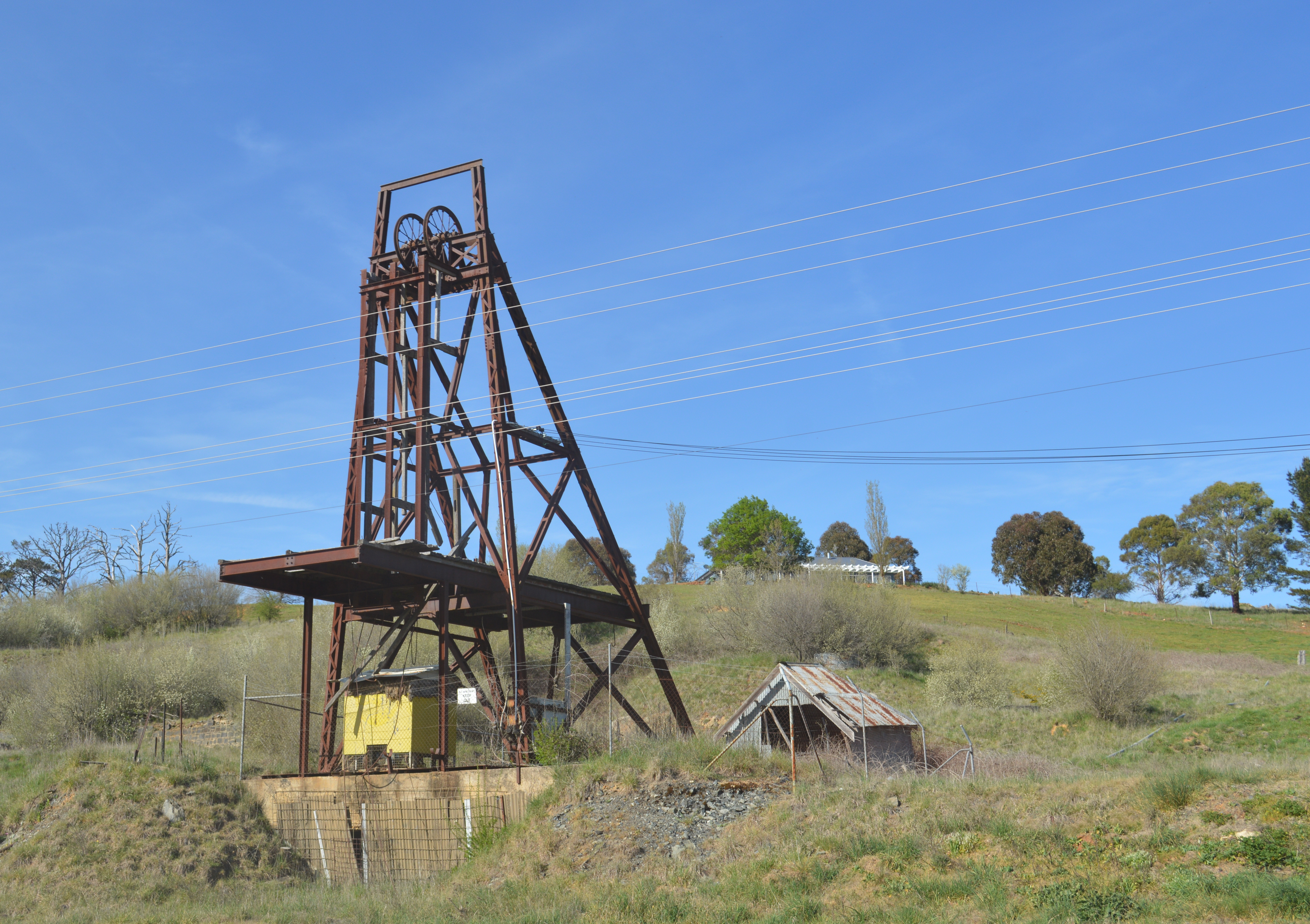
- Headframe over an abandoned mine shaft at Lucknow

- Location within New South Wales Location within Australia
- 33°20′56″S 149°09′57″E
- Location: 4570–4578 Mitchell Highway, Lucknow, City of Orange, New South Wales, Australia

History
- Built: 1890–1940

Site notes
- Architects: H. W. Newman; Alexander Marshall; Frederick McFadzean
- Owner: Orange City Council

New South Wales Heritage Register
- Official name: Wentworth and Reform Gold Mines; Main Mine or Wentworth Main Mine; Industrial Archaeological Site
- Type: State heritage (complex / group)
- Designated: 24 August 2018
- Reference no.: 2004
- Type: Mine site
- Category: Mining and Mineral Processing
- Builders: Not known for the buildings; Machinery includes a Thompson's winding engine from Castlemaine

Wentworth and Reform Gold Mines is a heritage-listed former Gillies artefact collection, churchyard and now abandoned gold mine at 4570–4578 Mitchell Highway, Lucknow, City of Orange, New South Wales, Australia. It was designed by H. W. Newman, Alexander Marshall and Frederick McFadzean and built from 1890 to 1940. Machinery includes a Thompson's winding engine from Castlemaine. It is also known as Main Mine or Wentworth Main Mine; Industrial Archaeological Site. The site is owned by the Orange City Council and was added to the New South Wales State Heritage Register on 24 August 2018.

The field was on the property of statesman William Wentworth, who subsequently sold it to the first gold mining company in Australia of which he was a director.

== History ==
The village of Lucknow has historic and scientific significance for its links with gold mining activity dating from the very first discovery in 1851 up to the present day. The Wentworth (or Lucknow) Goldfield was discovered in 1851, only two months after Australia's first payable gold find was made at nearby Ophir. It is a good representative example of the many small gold mining settlements which spread throughout the state, and nation, during the mid-late 19th century. This significance is enhanced by the degree to which it has retained many key elements of its original character both above and below ground. The above and below ground evidence of the village's early mining activity is both extensive and varied and the high scientific significance reflects its potential to provide information on early gold mining activity, if appropriately investigated.

The character of the village is enhanced by the extent of the remaining above ground mine shaft structures – particularly the steel head frames of the Wentworth Main and Reform sites – which are rare survivors, both within the region and the state, and give the village a striking historic accessible immediacy because of their prominent location on the main road.

The Wentworth gold field was private, and owned by W. C. Wentworth who controlled the number of mining ventures carried out on his land. The mining operations necessitated the establishment of a village that was to become known as Lucknow. Closely associated with the success of the Wentworth gold field was Henry H. Newman who was the company mine manager during the peak of the region's gold rush. Newman became a member of the NSW Parliament from 1891 until his death in 1904.

The Reform Mine has been described as the richest small gold field of its type in the world. Mining began here in the 1870s or earlier and prospered until the late 1890s. In 1935 the Wentworth Company built a new poppet head over the shaft to pump water in conjunction with the Wentworth Main shaft. At the height of the gold rush the whole hillside beyond the Reform site was a hive of activity, including a battery, foundry and grand two-storey mine office, along with houses, stables and numerous shafts and tunnels. Behind the Reform poppet head, impressive remains of bluestone walls can still be seen. Built on a series of levels, these formed the foundations of the mill, or battery. The small corrugated iron shed behind the poppet head, old equipment and overgrown mullock heaps are other reminders of years of toil by hundreds of men.

The site remains a significant landmark within the village of Lucknow, and is situated adjacent to the Michell Highway. In this initial era mining was limited to alluvial works followed by a scattering of underground mining activity, before mining became concentrated on the Chapel Hill area. An 1857 map of the Great Western Road shows two mine shafts and managers residence approximately in the same location as the present Wentworth main shaft.

He was renowned as both a mine owner, mine manager and a miners' advocate, supporting a range of charitable and community causes. A legacy of Newman's wealth is the magnificent Lucknow home "Mamhead". It was Newman who negotiated the purchase of the Wentworth Main Mine site, the relocation of the Wesleyan Church and the sinking of the Main Mine shaft. He was also responsible for the construction of the mine's associated 1890s infrastructure.

Mining activity declined in Lucknow by the 1920s, only to be renewed under amalgamated companies, particularly during the ownership of the Marshall family from the 1930s era. Most of the current infrastructure situated on the Wentworth main Mine site was constructed during this era. The Wentworth Main Shaft was used for dewatering, rather than mining access and extraction. Of note is the complex underground system of interconnected mine workings. The extraordinary underground system provides an efficient and specialised integrated network, now all substantially flooded due to a rising water table. From the 1960s, the mine site reverted to domestic small scale farming uses. Sheds were adapted for livestock management, gardens and trees were planted around the site.

The complex history of the site relates it to numerous other shafts, leases and companies that made up the mining history of Lucknow. The Wentworth Main Shaft Mine site covers the three main eras of central west mining from the first gold rush era of the 1850s, to the peak of the rush and the importation of mining technology during the 1870s–1890s, to the renewal of mining activity in the 1930s/40s. Each era represents differing technology for mining and ore treatment. Elements from all these eras can be interpreted in the Wentworth mine site, whereas the Reform Mine site has below-ground evidence of significant technical achievement.

As Lucknow has retained its village character, so has the area retained its social and family history connections. Therefore, their descendants represent many of the pioneer mining families in the Lucknow area today. This provides valuable insight into the social and cultural aspects of the miners who worked on the Wentworth goldfield and in particular on the Wentworth Main Mine site.

Orange City Council purchased the Wentworth Main Mine site in 2000. Conservation work was undertaken in 2004 to secure and weatherproof all mine buildings and infrastructure on the site.

== Description ==
The 1.89-hectare (5-acre) site contains the Wentworth Main Shaft that was sunk to a depth of some 240 metres (790 ft) during the 1890s. The original timber poppet head was replaced in the 1930s with a metal poppet head frame. Also during the 1930s, as a result of overseas investment, much of the Wentworth Main Mine infrastructure was renewed. The machinery room, office and equipment store are from this era. As mining operations expanded on the site previous eras of mining history disappeared under the new layers of infrastructure and mining activity. It appears from early records that one of the first shafts sunk on the Wentworth goldfield at Lucknow was located on this land. From a c. 1890s photo there is clear evidence of a small shaft with a hand-operated windlass located near the quartz outcrop close to the creek. This shaft is still in existence today and may well relate to the 1850s–1860 gold rush.

The site contains a series of corrugated iron buildings that remain intact. These buildings include the mine office, equipment storeroom, first aid room, blacksmith, change shed, machinery shed, mine managers cottage and stamper battery shed. The existence of a stamper battery shed is rare – it is the only known example in NSW and one of only five still in-situ within Australia. The stamper battery building houses a 10 head stamper and the ore processing tables. A steam engine, ore box and ore chute also remain in situ. Nearby are ash heaps from boilers and the water pipes that connected to the stamper battery.

Concrete pads provide evidence of the location of the former assay building as well as the site of cyanide tanks for the treatment of tailings. Cyanide sand dumps are also clearly visible.

Prominent to the site is the poppet head and the associated winding gear. The mine was used during the 20th century for dewatering, to lower the watertable within the Lucknow goldfields to permit mining at the Reform mine site. The poppet head was constructed for this purpose rather than for removing ore, and it is a dewatering bucket that is clearly visible suspended over the main shaft.

One of the unique factors of the Lucknow gold field was its operation as a private gold field. As a result, the underground workings (now flooded) form an extensive, integrated and highly organised structure.

During the 1960-1980s the site was used for domestic occupation. Domestic changes are minor and include construction of a stockyard adjacent to the blacksmith. A variety of ore bins and similar vessels were reused as poultry feeders and nesting boxes. During the 1980s a garage located adjacent to the equipment room was fitted with a roller panel and the room used as a roadside fruit stall.

Since Orange City Council's purchase of the site in 2000 a man proof security fence has been constructed around the site, and the site has been interpreted as an important introduction into the complexities of gold-mining.

The Reform Mine began production in the c. 1870s and was described as one of the richest small gold fields of its type. The Wentworth Company built the new poppet head over the main shaft in 1935 in order to pump water. At its peak, the Reform Mine had a battery, foundry, mine office, stables and houses. There are also an extensive network of underground shafts and tunnels. The condition of this site is poor compared to the Wentworth Mine, visible on the site now is the poppet head, a small shed, overgrown mullock heaps and remains of a bluestone wall. However, by way of contrast, the Reform Mine shows an appreciably industrial history of intensive mine activity rare by way of its preservation.

=== Condition ===
As at 14 December 2005, the collection of buildings provides an exception example of an early 20th century rural gold mine. The Wentworth site and its buildings are in good condition. Buildings are intact and have been subject to a recent program of conservation and maintenance. The majority of the machinery is no longer in-situ, however, base plates and machinery parts remain on site for further interpretation. Archaeological significance is moderate here. Much of the site's mullock heaps were removed during the 1950s, and each era of mining activity have encompassed early eras of operation.

No evidence remains of the church that was once located on the site, and given its vernacular construction there is little likelihood of archaeological evidence.

The winding engine and stamper battery, and an early boiler are in fair condition; the winder devoid of its brass fittings. Timber processing tables that were situation adjacent to the stamper battery are intact but their condition has deteriorated from use and immersion in water.

At its peak, the Reform Mine had a battery, foundry, mine office, stables and houses. There were also an extensive network of underground shafts and tunnels. Visible on the site now is the poppet head, a small shed, overgrown mullock heaps and remains of a bluestone wall. There is archaeological potential here, however, the presence of underground shafts and tunnels would make work challenging. The area is fenced from the public and a small funding grant has been provided to light up the poppet head.

As of 2019, many of the western facing doors and windows have been exposed to the elements over time and now essential conservation and restoration work to the sites main infrastructure is required to maintain the site as a leading tourism and educational destination of the Central West.

The program of works will include:

- Wash Room – repairs to the door and architrave
- Infirmary – repairs to the door and architrave
- Blacksmith Shop – adjustments to door and installation of flashing
- Storage Shed – replacement of posts, repairs to doors and construction of a new awning
- Pay Office – replay window putty on western windows
- Mine Managers Cottage – refix door hardware and re-divert water across ground service
- Pathways – install new edging and crushed granite
- Check all roofing screws and gutters.

The site has high to exception degree of integrity. The intactness of the site by its buildings and associated site workings ie mullock heaps, abandoned equipment, ash heaps etc., makes this site an exceptionally compact example of gold mining history and technology.

=== Modifications and dates ===
The first mining carried out on this site may have been as early as the 1850s. This would have been limited to a shaft located near the creek. The shaft remains and may have been altered to act as an air vent to the 1890s main shaft.

A timber and corrugated iron church was constructed on the site and relocated in the early 1890s. There is no evidence of the building.

The 1890s timber poppet head and associated corrugated iron machinery buildings no longer exist. A metal poppet head replaced the timber poppet head in 1930s. The machinery building has been extended and altered; the concrete footprint however reveals the various extensions to the building to accommodate larger compressors and the like.

The site includes an intact collection of 1930s era mining buildings and associated equipment. The 10 head stamper battery, ore processing tables, ore chute, ore buckets and the like remain in-situ. Also located upon the site are remnants of machinery including machinery from cyanide processing tank, a large boiler, various parts such as fire irons from boilers, ash deposits and cyanide sands.

During the era 1960–1980 the mine office and the mine managers cottage were used as residential buildings. Minor domestic scale works occurred during this time, such as construction of a stockyard and reuse of ore bins for poultry feeders and nesting boxes. The impact of these changes is minor and adds to the layers of history relating to the sits use. Also added to the site during the 1970s was a small laundry/shower building. The use of corrugated iron and a design that is in scale and keeping with the earlier buildings reduces the visual impact of this addition. The facility is located to the north of the office building.

During the 1990s the site was connected to the village sewer system.

=== Further information ===
Invaluable to the history if the site is the social history of the pioneer mining families of Lucknow. Many of the families remained in the area and their knowledge through family history associations adds an important and vital part to the Wentworth Mine story. The book Lucknow: A veritable gold mine by Kerrin Cook puts together the social history of the pioneer mining families of Lucknow and forms a basis for further work relating to the Wentworth mine site.

== Heritage listing ==
As at 13 September 2017, the Wentworth and Reform Mines are of state heritage significance as together the sites form relatively intact representations of the central west's gold mining history. The central west was the most productive gold mining area in NSW during the gold rush era. These sites are rare due to the intactness of buildings and significant associated with their prominence as significant and prominent landmarks and representing the cultural heritage association with Lucknow's mining past. Overall the sites represent a compact and intact example of late 19th century and early 20th century gold mining. The presence of the intact stamper battery building and its associated infrastructure is a rare example of its type remaining in situ in NSW.

Wentworth and Reform Gold Mines was listed on the New South Wales State Heritage Register on 24 August 2018 having satisfied the following criteria.

The place is important in demonstrating the course, or pattern, of cultural or natural history in New South Wales.

The sites together are of state heritage significance for their historical values which demonstrate, by their high degree of intactness and integrity, aspects of early 20th century rural commercial gold mines. The sites represent and demonstrate three eras of gold mining in NSW from the initial 1851 gold rush, through the mechanisation of gold mining during the 1870-80s to the resurgence of mining operations during the 1930s. The Wentworth site is highly significant for its intact collection of mining infrastructure and ability to demonstrate the continuity of gold mining activity on the site over a 100-year time frame. The presence of an intact stamper battery building complete with ten head stamper battery and ore tables is exceptional and a rare example in NSW.

The place has a strong or special association with a person, or group of persons, of importance of cultural or natural history of New South Wales's history.

At the time of the first gold finds, explorer, businessman and politician W. C. Wentworth owned the site. Various owners/directors of this private gold field included Orange businessman James Dalton and Cobb & Co directors James Rutherford and W. F. Whitney. During the peak of the Wentworth gold field Henry W. Newman, miner, mine manager, advocate and Parliamentarian managed the mines. This historical association demonstrates the sites' state significance.

The place is important in demonstrating aesthetic characteristics and/or a high degree of creative or technical achievement in New South Wales.

Both mine areas demonstrate technical significance at a state level, though the expression of these differ. Wentworth mine demonstrates a high degree of significance as a landmark, exemplifying old mining technology covering 100 years of NSW mining history. Located prominently adjacent to the Mitchell Highway, the poppet head dominates the landscape. The intactness of the site establishes the buildings and machinery utilised in the gold mining company operations, particularly of the 1930s era. The technology used in ore extraction and processing can be readily interpreted from this site.

The Reform Mine site, in comparison, has a distinctive poppet head and associated infrastructure scattered across the site, but its state level technical significance lies in the below-ground mining infrastructure, particularly the network of mine shafts, and Uncle Tom's mine, one of the richest gold veins in NSWs history.

The place has a strong or special association with a particular community or cultural group in New South Wales for social, cultural or spiritual reasons.

The Wentworth and Reform sites provide an important and identifiable collection of buildings, relics and landscape features that represent the importance of Lucknow's mining heritage and that of one of the premier goldfields in NSW. The presence of the site adjacent to a State Highway makes the site highly visible to the travelling public, and its dominant landmark features are important to the wider community of regular travellers moving from all parts of NSW through the central west region.

The place has potential to yield information that will contribute to an understanding of the cultural or natural history of New South Wales.

The Wentworth Mine site with its various buildings, machinery and landscape feature may have high significance in its potential to contribute NSW's knowledge of gold mining activities and the advances of technology. Further research into the site, and the integrated operation of the entire Wentworth gold field is likely to reveal considerable social, technical and scientific research information, archaeological and otherwise, about the evolution of the central west gold fields and the associated mining companies and communities.

The place possesses uncommon, rare or endangered aspects of the cultural or natural history of New South Wales.

The sites are rare for NSW as they demonstrate a comprehensive account of company gold mining activities during the late 19th century and the first half of the 20th century. The existence of the stamper battery building and its associated infrastructure is considered rare and is thought to be one of the few remaining in situ in NSW.

The place is important in demonstrating the principal characteristics of a class of cultural or natural places/environments in New South Wales.

The non-contiguous sites have a state level significance in their ability to demonstrate characteristics of a gold mine operating in rural NSW, especially during the 1890s–1940s eras. The Wentworth Mine is outstanding for its intactness of buildings and its restoration, with the interpretation enabling an understanding of the history of the gold mining process.

Reform Mine is an unaltered representation of Lucknow's goldmining history – its location within the village of Lucknow and its landmark landscape qualities that are highly visible from the adjacent Mitchell Highway contributes to the sites significance.

== See also ==
- Australian gold rushes
- Gold mining in New South Wales
