= Hargraves House, Noraville =

Hargraves House
- Location within New South Wales Location within Australia
- 33°16′02″S 151°33′44″E
- Location: 3 Elizabeth Drive, Noraville, Central Coast, New South Wales, Australia

History
- Built: 1856–1859

Site notes
- Area: Overlooking Hargraves Beach
- Architect: Edward Hammond Hargraves
- Owner: Hargraves family

New South Wales Heritage Register
- Official name: Noraville, Hargraves House; Hargraves House
- Type: State heritage (complex / group)
- Designated: 2 April 1999
- Reference no.: 131
- Type: Homestead building
- Category: Residential buildings (private)
- Builders: Mr Fletcher

Hargraves House, Noraville is a heritage-listed house at 3 Elizabeth Drive, Noraville on the Central Coast of New South Wales, Australia. It was designed by Edward Hammond Hargraves and built from 1856 to 1859 by Mr Fletcher. It is also known as Hargraves House and Norahville. It was added to the New South Wales State Heritage Register on 2 April 1999.

== History ==
Edward Hammond Hargraves had bought land from Robert Henderson, a former constable, ship owner and largest resident land holder in the district. Henderson had received a crown grant in 1854 and by 1856 held 810 hectares (2,000 acres) at Norah Head. In 1856 Hargraves bought portions 37, being 11 hectares (27 acres), and 38, being 20 hectares (50 acres), from Henderson.

The Noraville homestead was built in 1856-7 on a grassy plateau above the sea cliffs by Hargraves using money awarded to him by the Victorian government for his discovery of payable gold. Apart from a short period from 1877 to 1892, the property has remained in the ownership of the Hargraves family ever since.

- 1877 Hargraves sold Noraville to Dr Harman John Tarrant, surgeon at Sydney Hospital and Member of the New South Wales Legislative Assembly, who held it 15 years.
- 1892 Tarrant declared bankrupt, and the property returned to the Hargraves family, being bought by Edward's second son, William Henry Hargraves. (Edward had died in 1891 at age 75 from a fall off a horse, and was buried in Waverley Cemetery). While William had the title, it was his older brother Edward John Hargraves who resided lifelong at Noraville. Edward John married Elizabeth Catherine Owens, who (at age 17) went to live at Noraville and remained there until her death in 1950. They reportedly had 12 children not all of whom survived. These were educated privately by a governess and tutor. Other staff on the property included four maids, up to six stockmen, a groom, and two farmers to attend the gardens, orchards, vineyard, cultivation paddocks.
- 1950s Noraville subdivided into 5 equal shares for Charles Hargraves' (son of Edward & Elizabeth) five children.
- 1970 Florence Hargraves transferred her share to Charles Edward Hargraves (brother), the father of the present owner, John Charles Hargraves.
- 1972 Christine Elizabeth Hargraves transferred her share to John Charles Hargraves and his wife Leoniee (née Mackenzie).
- 1978 IHO placed on property at the request of one of the owners, Edith Foley, due to the perceived threat of further subdivision
- In February 1981 the Minister-appointed Planning and Environment Commission held an inquiry pursuant to section 41 of the Heritage Act, which found that Noraville was of state significance and ruled that a PCO be made over the property.

== Description ==
Estate and setting

Originally, an extensive landholding with gardens, orchards, vineyards and cultivation paddocks. Landscape elements (now archaeological sites) include the site of the former tennis court, c. 1910, and a former duck pond, can now be seen as a depression in the grass in front (north) of the homestead adjacent to Elizabeth Drive and west of the mature stand of Moreton Bay figs, (Ficus macrophylla) respectively.

The property was gradually subdivided and sold off from the 1920s onwards. The last major subdivision was in the mid 1950s (1956-7) when the remaining estate was divided between the five children of Charles Hargraves. As part of this a former market garden area west of the homestead was subdivided for housing, the only remnants of it being a broken line of mature coral trees (Erythrina sp.), one of which is in Noraville's remaining garden, south-west of the homestead near the entrance drive.

The homestead sits on a vastly reduced curtilage, however the open grassed area to the north-north-west still provides a suitable foreground setting. The setting has already been compromised by the erection of two storey dwellings on the adjacent plot of land immediately to its rear (south). While views to north, south, and west have been compromised by 2 & 3 storey development, the north-west and north-east vista to the ocean is intrinsic to the significance of Noraville.

Homestead

The homestead, known as "Noraville", is situated on the cliff top at Noraville, near Norah Head, facing north-west, overlooking Hargraves Beach to the east. The western boundary of the site is bounded by Elizabeth Drive (constructed in the 1956-7 subdivision). Once situated on a much larger land holding, the homestead is now surrounded on three sides (north, west, south) by two and three storey residential housing with only the original northern boundary to the ocean remaining.

The homestead is a single storey, weatherboard construction with a verandah on three sides. It was built in 1856-9. The homestead is orientated north-west with views north-west and north-east towards the cliffs and ocean. Both the homestead and associated service buildings are located to the south of the site with an open grassed area to the north. The service buildings consist of a 1969 kitchen and attached carport and a store or dormitory, constructed in 1920. Both of these structures are situated to the rear (south) of the homestead.

Outbuildings

While the homestead itself and its ocean views remain relatively unchanged today, most of the outbuildings were demolished at the time of the last subdivision in the 1950s. The stables had already been destroyed by fire in 1914. The existing fibro store to the rear dates from 1920, when it replaced earlier timber slab sheds. It consists of three small rooms and a bathroom and is thought to have been used for itinerant workers who worked at Noraville during the Depression. The existing kitchen building dates from 1969, and was erected on the site of the original kitchen.

Major plantings

A line of existing Norfolk Island pine trees (Araucaria heterophylla) runs along the north-western site boundary, planted c. 1960. A group of four existing coral trees (Erythrina sp.) lie east of the homestead near the boundary of the public garden. A lone (and rather stunted) Norfolk Island pine lies north-east of the homestead near the boundary. Three existing coral trees and a line of existing shrubs (oleanders (Nerium oleander), sweet box (Murraya paniculata)) runs along the south-western boundary, and another line of oleanders behind (east) of a hedge of sweet box (both planted c. 1960) run along the western boundary near Elizabeth Drive.

An area of shrubs and garden, including a line of six mature Moreton Bay fig trees (Ficus macrophylla), a coral tree, palms and a tuckeroo tree (Cupaniopsis anacardiodes) are to the west of the homestead's western end, and another existing coral tree is between these and the western boundary, near the existing driveway. The fig trees were c. 12 metres (39 ft) tall in 1914 photographs, making them at least date from the 1860-70s. One of them has an epiphytic seedling of a Port Jackson fig (Ficus rubiginosa) growing on its trunk. Self-seeded native cabbage palms (Livistona australis) are growing below the fig trees on the western side and eastern side near the homestead.

An existing garden area is immediately south-east of the main homestead includes a group of Lord Howe Island palms (Kentia fosteriana), an emergent (and mature) leaning palm (Washingtonia robusta), and lower shrubs including Hibiscus rosa-sinensis. The Washingtonia could date from c. 1900 from its height, but other palms are younger, perhaps c. 1980s, although 1914 photographs do show low palms that range from 4 to 5 metres (13 to 16 ft), i.e.: not much shorter than these are now.

A former tennis court was north of the homestead, and former bachelor's quarters were to its south-east.

Scattered shrub plantings in front (north) of the homestead include frangipani (Plumeria rubra) and oleanders.

To the east of the homestead/garden is a cliff which is vegetated with both remnant and regenerating locally native coastal vegetation which includes coastal banksia (Banksia integrifolia), tuckeroo trees and paperbarks (Melaleuca sp.), in relatively low scrub.

=== Condition ===
As at 29 March 2004, the sites of former outbuildings were all located to the east and rear of the homestead to maintain ocean views. Landscape elements such as the site of the former tennis court, c. 1910, and a former duck pond, can be seen as a depression in the grass in front of the homestead adjacent to Elizabeth Drive and west of the stand of figs, respectively. The approximate layout of former outbuildings and landscape elements is shown in the Archaeological Assessment. The new scheme proposed and endorsed by the Heritage Council will have much less impact than the other proposals for the site.

Some of the more sensitive areas have been identified and a condition has been made to ensure there is no trenching in these spots. Further the two new buildings to the east of the kitchen are to be supported above the ground on piles, the location of which can be moved as required to miss any sensitive artefacts.

While much of the original farm has been subject to subdivision and residential development, the present site of Noraville homestead and its surrounds are considered to have archaeological potential in areas where limited disturbance has occurred. Excavation has the potential to reveal information about the lives of the Hargraves family, their employees, and the operation of the farm in what was once a remote coastal residence. Structural and artefactual evidence may exist, particularly east of and beneath the kitchen (1969) and fibro store (1920)'.

The proposed cottage and family room may disturb some remains an these areas are to be monitored during early site works. This is the site of the former Bachelor's Quarters and Meat Store. These sites are considered to have high archaeological potential. The new garage is not located over any known relics and excavation in this area is considered to have low archaeological potential.

=== Modifications and dates ===
- 1914 The stables had already been destroyed by fire.
- 1920 fibro store to the rear built, replacing earlier timber slab sheds.
- 1920s–1950s subdivisions of estate.
- 1950s most of the outbuildings were demolished at the time of the last subdivision in the 1950s.
- 1956–57 subdivision, loss of former market garden area west of the homestead.
- c. 1960 planting of Norfolk Island pines along north-western boundary, sweet box hedge and oleanders on western boundary to Elizabeth Drive (itself created in 1950s subdivisions), and oleanders and swamp oaks on southern boundary.
- 1969 existing kitchen building erected on the site of the original kitchen.

=== Further information ===
2003 – IDA/s.60 – retains the original house as the main family residence on the site. The buildings at the rear are to be upgraded and a new family room is to be constructed adjacent to the existing kitchen. The former servants quarters are to be converted into accommodation. There is also to be at the rear of the property a new garage and 2 bedroom residential cottage between the house and the sea.

The proposal is based on a proposal known an Option 4 which was endorsed by the Heritage Council at a meeting on 4 December 2002.

== Heritage listing ==
The Noraville Homestead is a rare surviving residence of its period, as an early (1856–1859) Australian homestead set in an imposing setting on the cliffs at Norah Head, commanding sweeping views of the Pacific Ocean. It is associated with a notable figure in Australia's colonial history, Edward Hammond Hargraves. Hargraves built Noraville from reward money received for his controversial discovery of payable gold at Ophir in 1851. The site shows a continuity of historical process and activity in relation to the occupation and functioning of the homestead for the past 146 years and in its long association with one family, the Hargraves, with farming and coastal settlement throughout this period. It is an integral part of Australia's early coastal, farming and family history.

Hargraves House is a fine example of the Colonial Georgian style. It has not been greatly altered during the late 19th or 20th century and remains in good condition. Its well-preserved appearance, rare cedar composition and prominent cliff-top setting, coupled with the preservation of original ocean views to the northwest-northeast, afford it considerable aesthetic significance. Original views have been compromised by residential development to the north, west and south; however, the remaining north-west and north-east vista to the ocean is intrinsic to the significance of Noraville.

Although much of the original farm has been subdivided and the early outbuildings demolished, there is an opportunity to gain insights from the past from the homestead itself, and potential subsurface structural and artefactual remains on this surviving portion of land.

Hargraves House is considered significant because of its potential to yield archaeological evidence of farming, coastal settlement and family life from the mid-19th century.

The homestead has local social significance to the community of Noraville, the suburb named after it. Several streets and the adjacent beach are named after members of the family. There has been considerable community interest in the past over the partial screening of the homestead from the public view by hedging and a stand of coral trees.

Hargraves House was listed on the New South Wales State Heritage Register on 2 April 1999.

== See also ==
- Australian gold rushes
- New South Wales gold rush
- Hargraves, New South Wales
- Ophir, New South Wales
- Byng, New South Wales
