= Hargraves, New South Wales =

Hargraves New South Wales
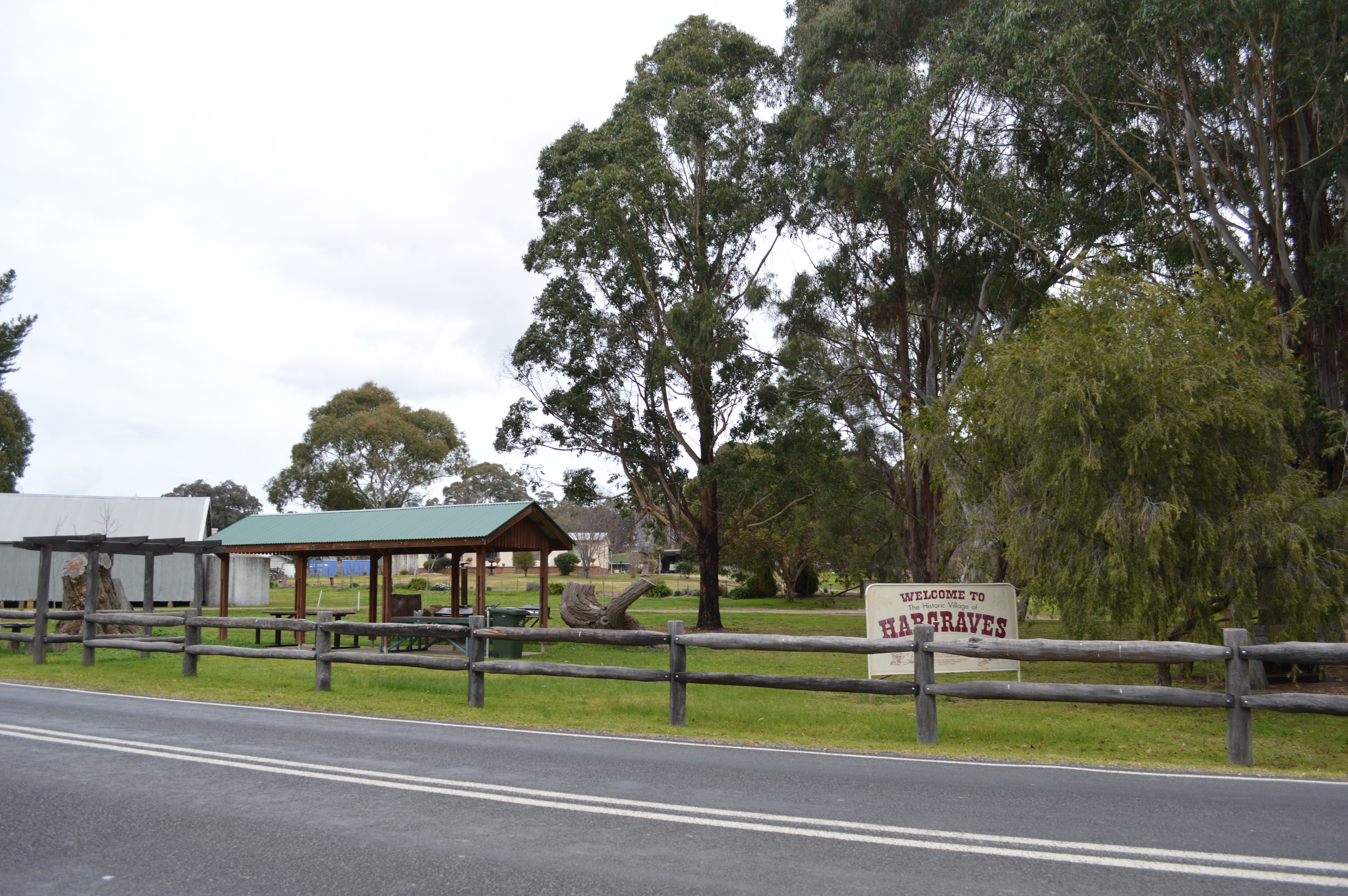
- A park in Hargraves

- Coordinates: 32°47′0″S 149°27′0″E
- Population: 300 (2021 census)
- Postcode(s): 2850
- Location: 306 km (190 mi) NW of Sydney; 113 km (70 mi) N of Bathurst; 39 km (24 mi) SW of Mudgee
- LGA(s): Mid-Western Regional Council
- State electorate(s): Orange
- Federal division(s): Parkes

Hargraves is a village in Central West New South Wales, Australia. It is 306 kilometres (190 mi) north west of the state capital of Sydney and 39 kilometres (24 mi) southwest of the town of Mudgee, New South Wales, Australia. At the 2021 census, Hargraves had a population of 300.

It lies within the traditional lands of the Wiradjuri people.

Initially known as Louisa Creek, it was renamed Hargraves after Edward Hargraves. It owes its origins to gold mining, which occurred there from the early 1850s.

== See also ==
- Australian gold rushes
- New South Wales gold rush
- Ophir, New South Wales
- Hargraves House
