= Alexander John =

Alexander John may refer to:

- Prince Alexander John of Wales (1871–1871), son of King Edward VII and Queen Alexandra
- Alexander John (athlete) (born 1986), German track and field athlete
- Alexander St John (died 1657), English politician
- Aleksander John, alias of Slovenian-Yugoslavian musician Aleksander Mežek (born 1948)

== See also ==
- John Alexander (disambiguation)
- Aleksander John Tenement, a building in Warsaw, Poland
