= Edward Hargraves =

Australian gold prospector (1816–1891)

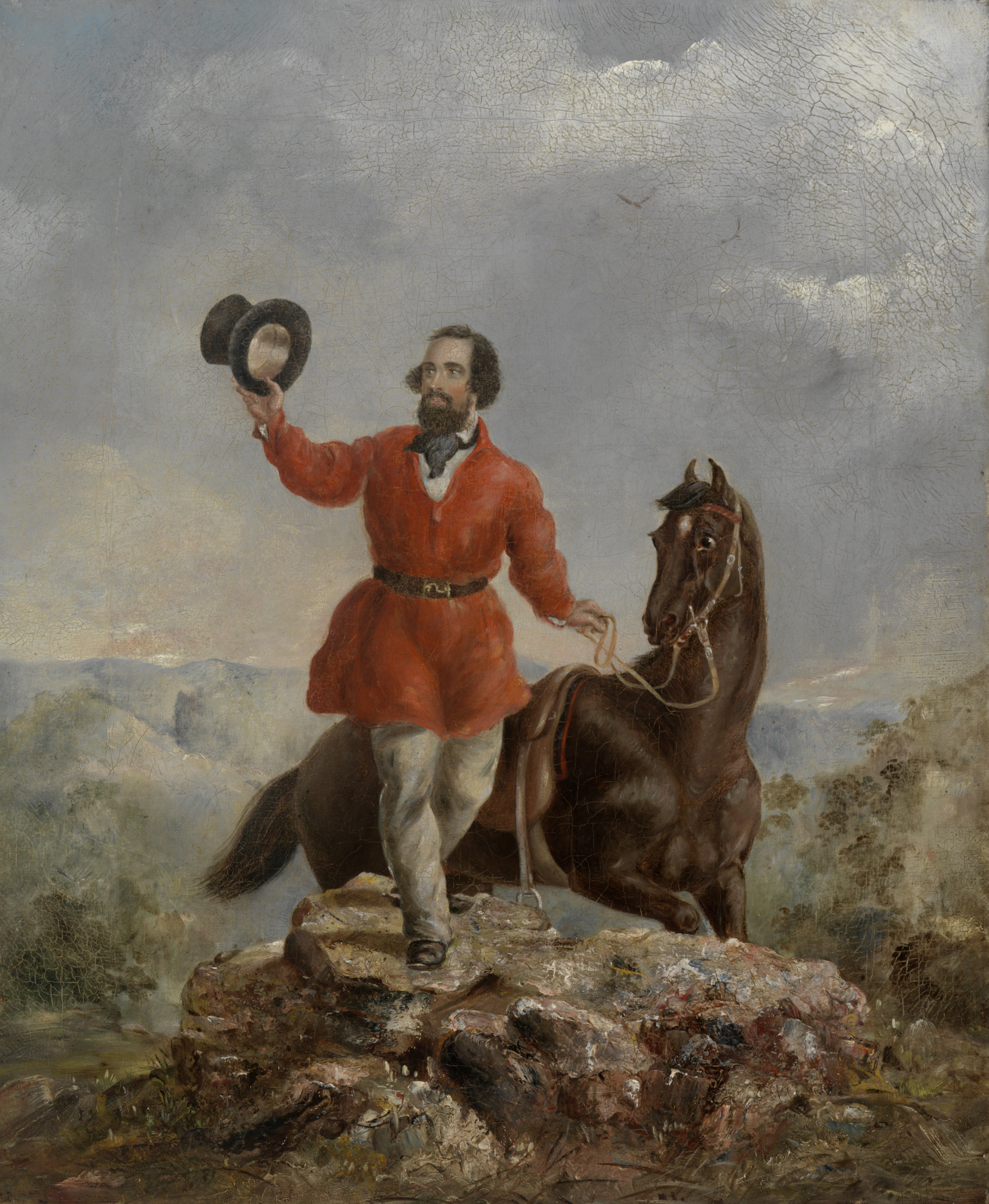
- Hargraves in 1851
- Born: 7 October 1816; Gosport, Hampshire, England
- Died: 29 October 1891 (aged 75); Sydney, Australia
- Occupation: Commissioner of Crown Lands
- Known for: Australian gold rush

Edward Hammond Hargraves (7 October 1816 – 29 October 1891) was an Australian gold prospector who led an expedition in the Macquarie River region of New South Wales in 1851, and publicised the resulting finds, starting the New South Wales gold rush.

== Early life ==
Edward Hammond Hargraves was born on 7 October 1816 in Gosport, Hampshire, England, the son of Elizabeth (née Whitcombe) and John Edward Hargraves. He was educated in Brighton and Lewes, but left school at the age of 14 to go to sea. He arrived in Sydney in 1832.

After his arrival in the colony of New South Wales, Hargraves worked on a property at Bathurst for a period and then went north to the Torres Strait, working in the bêche-de-mer and tortoiseshell industries. In 1834, he took up 100 acres (40 ha) of land near Wollongong. He married Elizabeth Mackay in Sydney in 1836, and in 1839 they moved to East Gosford. Hargraves was an agent for the General Steam Navigation Company and also established the Fox Under The Hill Hotel. In 1843, he took up another property on the Manning River, leaving his wife behind to look after the hotel.

In July 1849, Hargraves left for the United States to participate in the California gold rush. He was unsuccessful but returned to Australia in January 1851 with knowledge of prospecting techniques and hopeful of discovering gold closer to home.

== Gold discovery ==
Various people had discovered small quantities of alluvial gold in Australia prior to 1848, but the government was not inclined to publicise those discoveries for fear of the destabilising effect of a gold rush. When William Branwhite Clarke mentioned to Governor George Gipps in 1844 that he had found gold, Gipps reportedly said "Put it away Mr Clarke or we shall all have our throats cut."

The Californian gold rush changed official attitudes. The rush to California left New South Wales with a shortage of workers and an economic depression. The new governor, Charles Augustus FitzRoy, felt that a discovery of gold could revive the colony's fortunes.

In January 1851, Hargraves sold what little gold he had collected in California, borrowed £105 for a horse and provisions, and set out for Guyong. There, in February, he met John Lister, the son of the innkeeper at the Wellington Inn, then aged 22. Lister agreed to join Hargraves on his search for gold and suggested that his friend James Tom accompany them. Hargraves showed them the method of panning for gold and took them on a search of the Macquarie River area without success.

James Tom's brother William later said: "The reason why Mr Hargraves could not find gold in 1851 was this: He was too lazy to look for it in a proper manner; he always experimented on the higher instead of lower strata of the alluvial deposits he was taken to. [...] While in the Bathurst district, Hargraves never dug a hole a foot deep."

Hargraves suggested that they build a cradle, to allow them to wash the soil more efficiently. William Tom took up the challenge, completing the device in March. On 16 March, Hargraves and Lister returned to Sydney, with Hargraves hoping to meet with Colonial Secretary Edward Deas Thomson in order to gain a promise of a reward if gold was found.

While Hargraves was away, James, William and Henry Tom took the cradle out and used it to wash the soil in a nearby waterway. In two days they found 16 grains (1.0 g). By the middle of April, with Lister's help, who had returned by that time, they had 4 ounces (110 g). Keeping their discovery a secret, they wrote to Hargraves.

Encouraged by the news, Hargraves convinced the Colonial Secretary to promise a reward in proportion to the scale of the findings. Hargraves wrote to The Sydney Morning Herald describing the rich fields, and a report was published on 2 May.

The Gold Discovery. – It is no longer any secret that gold has been found in the earth in several places in the western country. The fact was first established on the 12th February, 1851, by Mr. E. H. Hargraves, a resident of Brisbane Water, who returned from California a few months since. While in California, Mr. Hargraves felt persuaded that from the similarity of the geological formation there must be gold in several districts of this colony, and when he returned here his expectations were realized. What the value of the discovery may be it is impossible to say. Three men, who worked for three days with very imperfect machinery realized £2 4s. 8d. each per diem; whether they will continue to do so remains to be seen. The subject was brought under the consideration of the Government, who admitted Mr. Hargrave's claim for some consideration for the discovery, but of course could make no definite promise until the value of the gold field was ascertained. Mr. Stutchbury, the Geological Surveyor, is now in the district, and Mr. Hargraves has proceeded there to communicate with him, and in a few weeks we may expect definite information. At present all that is known is that there is gold over a considerable district; whether it is in sufficient quantities to pay for the trouble of obtaining it remains to be ascertained. Should it be found in large quantities a strict system of licensing diggers will be immediately necessary.

— The Sydney Morning Herald, 2 May 1851

This report, with its promise of easy money, caused immediate excitement. By 15 May, 300 diggers had arrived and the gold rush was underway. It misleadingly dated the discovery to 12 February, but at that time Hargraves had only found a few tiny specks of gold dust by panning, a quantity which was not unprecedented and not sufficient.

The government soon gave Hargraves the extraordinary reward of £10,000, equivalent to $2.4 million AUD in 2025. The government of Victoria promised him £5,000 although only £2,381 was actually given. Hargraves refused to share this money with Lister or the Tom brothers despite his earlier promises of a fair joint venture.

The goldfield was named Ophir after the biblical Ophir.

== Contesting Hargraves' claims ==
By 1853, Lister and the Tom brothers realised they had been used by Hargraves. They campaigned for a separate reward and sought to downplay Hargraves' role in the gold discovery in the public eye.

Hargraves wrote a book entitled Australia and its Goldfields: a historical sketch of the Australian colonies from the earliest times to the present day with a particular account of the recent gold discoveries, published in 1855. This book increased the animosity between Hargraves and his former companions.

Their bitter feud would continue until 1890, when a Legislative Assembly select committee finally credited Lister and the Tom brothers as the true discoverers of payable gold. However, the myth of Hargraves as the "discoverer of gold" continues.

William Branwhite Clarke, who had been told in 1844 to keep quiet about his gold discovery, also campaigned for recognition.

Matt Murphy, in his 2025 book Gold: The Remarkable Story of Edward Hammond Hargraves, describes Hargraves a "loathsome charlatan".

== Later life and death ==
In 1851, Hargraves was appointed Commissioner of Crown Lands in recognition for his reputed gold find.

In 1856, he purchased a 640-acre (260 ha) landing at Budgewoi on the Central Coast of New South Wales. He went on to build "Norahville" (also called Hargraves House) at Noraville. Wollombi Aboriginal tribe members are known to have worked on the property. Some sources state that Hargraves had "befriended" the Aboriginal tribe members.

By the early 1860s, he was "virtually penniless". He asked Victoria for the balance of the £5,000 they had promised, and when it wasn't forthcoming, travelled to Melbourne and conducted a hateful campaign against members of parliament.

In 1877, Hargraves was granted a pension of £250 per year by the Government of New South Wales, which he received until his death in 1891.

Hargraves died at his residence in the Sydney suburb of Forest Lodge, on 29 October 1891, and was buried at Waverley Cemetery.

== Legacy ==
Hargraves left a small estate to his five surviving children.

In the vicinity of his Noraville house, there is a Hargraves Beach and a Hargraves Street. The village of Hargraves, New South Wales, is also named after him. Hargreaves (sic) Mall in Bendigo is one of the city's main shopping areas.
