= Lucknow, New South Wales =

Lucknow
- Town
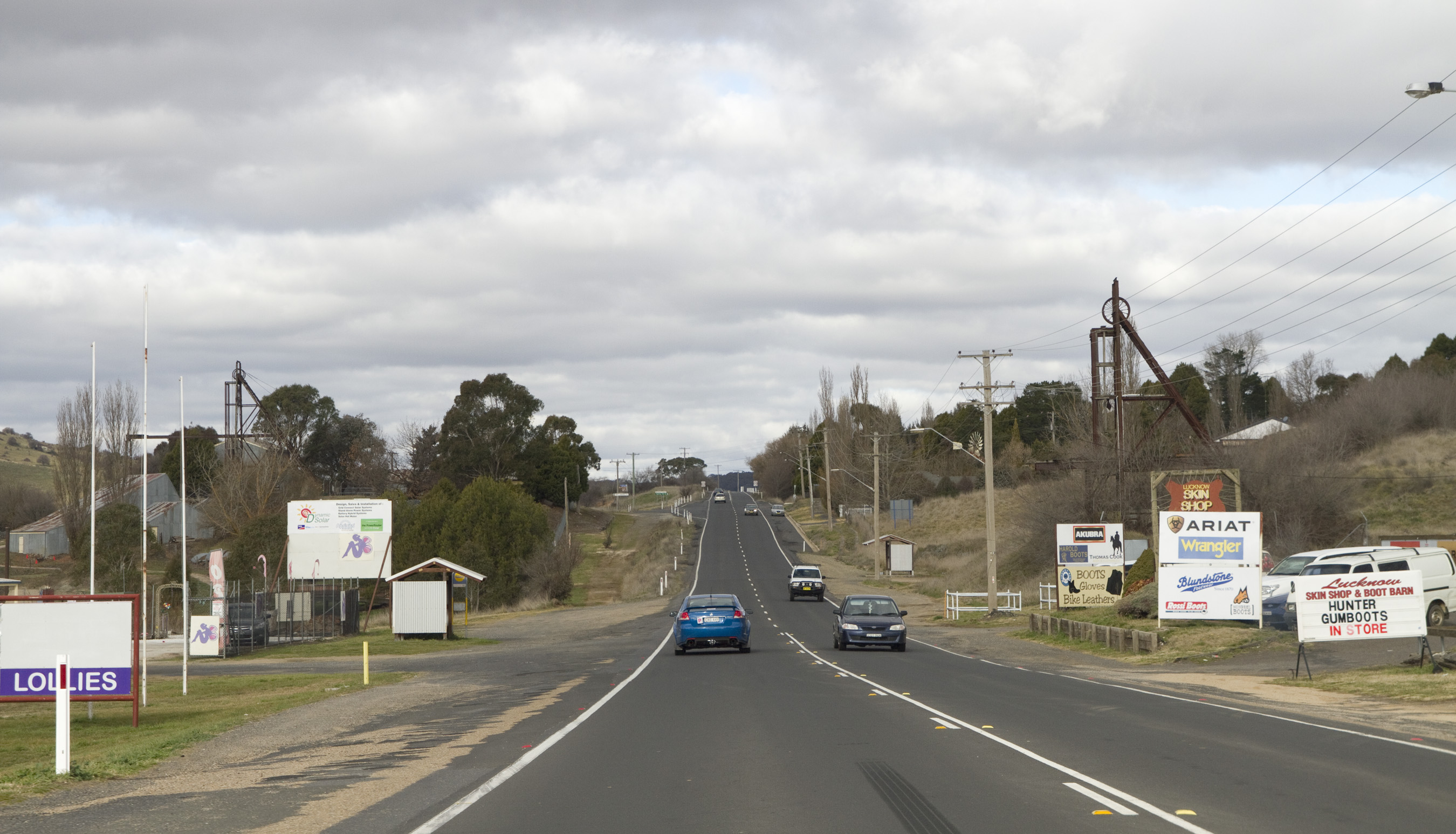
- Mitchell Highway passing through Lucknow

- Coordinates: 33°20′47″S 149°09′42″E
- Country: Australia
- State: New South Wales
- LGA: City of Orange
- Location: 245 km (152 mi) W of Sydney; 45 km (28 mi) W of Bathurst; 10 km (6.2 mi) SE of Orange

Government
  - State electorate: Orange
  - Federal division: Calare
- Elevation: 881 m (2,890 ft)

Population
  - Total: 297 (2016 census)
- Postcode: 2800
Localities around Lucknow
Orange	Emu Swamp	Emu Swamp
Spring Creek	Lucknow	Byng
Huntley	Spring Hill	Shadforth

Lucknow is a locality in the Central West region of New South Wales, Australia, on the Mitchell Highway and adjacent to the regional centre of Orange. The locality is in the City of Orange local government area, 245 kilometres (152 mi) west of the state capital, Sydney.

At the 2016 census, Lucknow had a population of 297.

== History ==
Lucknow (pronounced "Luck no") was once a property of statesman William Wentworth and was the site of the second major gold discovery in Australia. Shortly after the discovery, he sold it to Australia's first gold mining company, the Wentworth Gold Field Company, of which he was a director.

== Heritage listings ==
At 4570-4578 Mitchell Highway, the Wentworth and Reform Gold Mines is heritage listed.
