= Ophir, New South Wales =

Ophir
- Town
- Coordinates: 33°7′42.3″S 149°14′34.3″E
- Country: Australia
- State: New South Wales
- LGA: Cabonne Shire Council

Population
  - Total: 128 (SAL 2021)

Ophir a locality in New South Wales, Australia, in Cabonne Shire.

== History and gold discovery ==
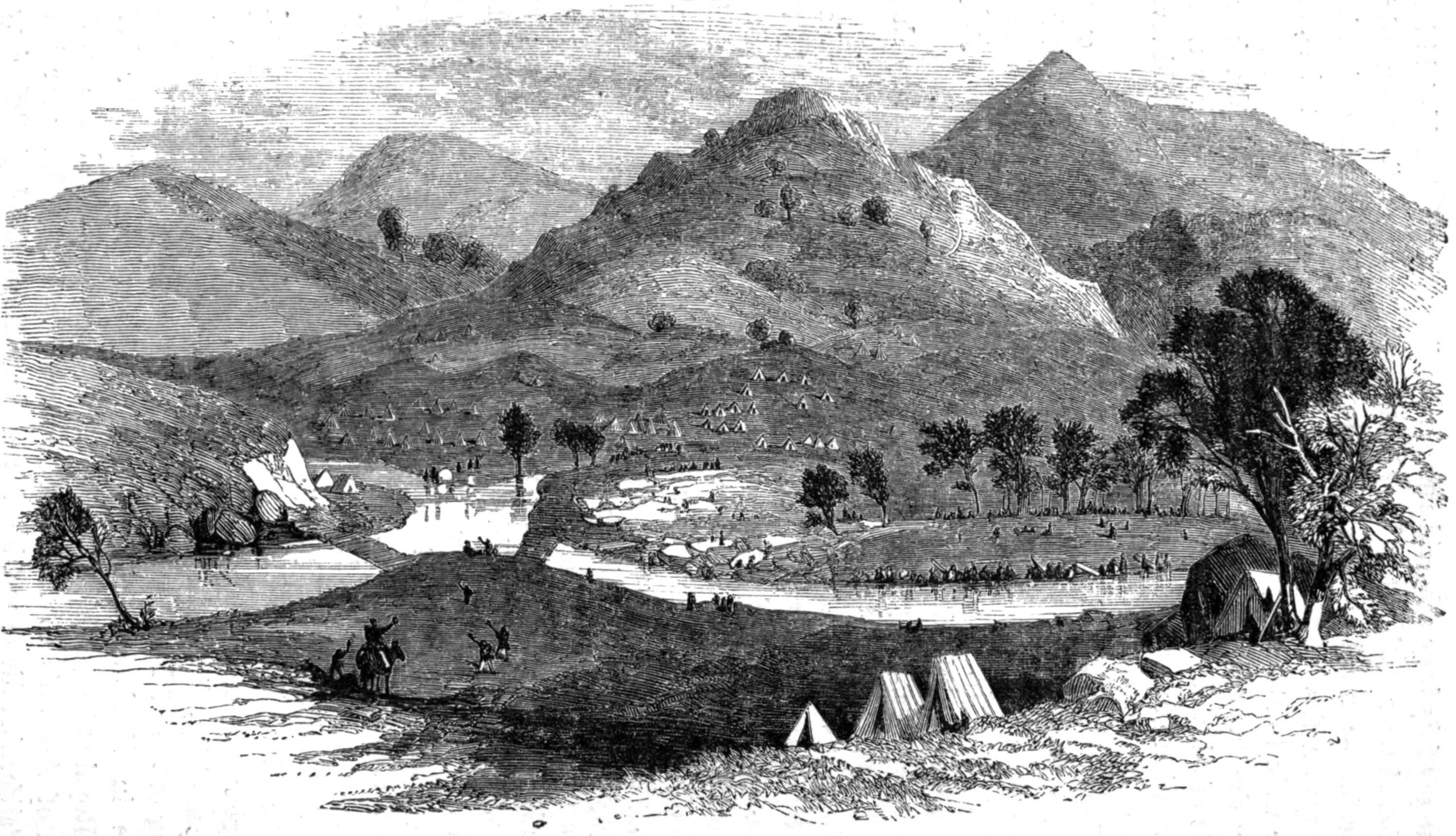
Gold diggings at Ophir (1853)

The area now known as Ophir lies on the traditional lands of Wiradjuri people.

Ophir is located near the Macquarie River northeast of the city of Orange. Ophir is the place where payable gold was first discovered in New South Wales in 1851, leading to the Australian gold rushes. In popular literature it has been stated that William Tom Jr, John Lister and Edward Hargraves found payable gold in February 1851 at the "Ophir gold diggings" located at the confluence of Summer Hill Creek and Lewis Ponds Creek (33°10′7.68″S 149°14′19.68″E). In fact, although Hargraves found some 'colours' upstream of Ophir, in February 1852, he himself never found a payable gold deposit. Payable gold was discovered in April 1851.

Hargraves claimed the reward for discovering gold, and was awarded £10,500 (worth $1,125,434 in 2004 values) by the NSW Government. In 1890, a select committee of the NSW Legislative Assembly recognised Lister and the two Tom brothers as co-discoverers—albeit after many years of Hargraves being honoured alone—concluding that "Messrs Tom and Lister were undoubtedly the first discoverers of gold obtained in Australia in payable quantity".

The inscription on the monumental obelisk commemorating the 1851 gold discovery, located near the junction of Lewis Ponds Creek and Summer Hill Creek, at Ophir, succinctly states the generally accepted account of the events, during the period from February to April, 1851. It reads, "This obelisk was erected by the New South Wales Government to commemorate the first discovery in Australia of payable gold, which was found in the creek in front of this monument. Those responsible for the discovery were:—Edward Hammond Hargraves, John Hardman Australia Lister, James Tom, William Tom. From experience gained in California, Hargraves formed the idea that the district was auriferous, and he found the first gold on 12th February, 1851, about two miles up Lewis Pond Creek. He explained to the others how to prospect and use a miner's cradle, and Lister and W. Tom found payable gold between 7th and 12th April, 1851."

William Tom's father (Parson Tom) named the area "Ophir" after a region in the Old Testament noted for its fine gold. On 2 May 1851, news of gold at Ophir became public knowledge—by Hargraves attempting to further substantiate his claim to a reward, through an article in the Sydney Morning Herald—triggering the New South Wales gold rush. There was a gold rush to the area in 1851 and 1852. The village of Ophir was laid out in 1851 by Major Sir Thomas Livingstone Mitchell and its first lots were sold in 1852. Reef gold was discovered in 1868 by Joseph Christopherson.

Although Hargraves was honoured and rewarded, it may have been the mineralogist William Tipple Smith who first discovered gold at what would be later named Ophir, in 1848. On 27 February 1852, William Tipple Smith wrote to geologist Sir Roderick Murchison in England saying the spot now called Ophir was the very spot where he had found nugget gold in 1848. Smith's claims and correspondence are exhaustively studied in a 1986 book, A Fool's Gold?, by Lynette Ramsay Silver, in the foreword of which geology professor David Branagan of Sydney University concurs and states "It is good to see him deservedly remembered in the pages of this book." William Tipple Smith was one of the owners of the Fitzroy Iron Works at Mittagong and, during a visit in February 1849, Governor Charles Augustus FitzRoy was presented with a steel knife "mounted with colonial gold".

Some remnants of old alluvial, reef, and deep lead mines, are located within the Ophir Reserve, which includes the former site of the town. The town's cemetery also remains. There is an obelisk that commemorates the discovery of payable gold, in 1851, giving credit to Edward Hargraves, John Lister, James Tom, and William Tom.

All that remains of William Tipple Smith is one small gold sample and a previously unmarked grave (number 4929, section 4, Rookwood Cemetery) that was only recently provided with a headstone recognising him as the discoverer of the first payable gold in Australia.

== See also ==
- Australian gold rushes
- New South Wales gold rush
- Edward Hargraves
- Hargraves, New South Wales
- Hargraves House, Noraville
- Byng, New South Wales
