= John Alexander (doctor) =

John Alexander was a medical health officer for the county of Caithness, North Scotland until his death on 5 December 1901.

Alexander married Georgina Duguid, of Aberdeenshire. His brother, Alexander Alexander, was also in the medical industry.

A few years after John Alexander's death, a monument in Wick was erected in his memory. It still stands today on a small hill beside the local railway station. Alexander's grave is located in Watten Cemetery, where he is buried alongside his wife, two nephews, his great nephew, and his second great niece.
