= John Alexander (footballer, born 1985) =

English footballer (born 1985)

Personal information
- Full name: John David Alexander
- Date of birth: 24 September 1985 (age 41)
- Place of birth: Middlesbrough, England
- Height: 6 ft 0 in (1.83 m)
- Position: Forward

Youth career
- –: Darlington

Senior career*
Years	Team	Apps	(Gls)
2002–2004	Darlington	4	(0)
2002–2003	→ Bishop Auckland (loan)		
2004	→ Bishop Auckland (loan)		
2004	Billingham Synthonia	6	(2)
2004	Stetson Hatters		
2005	Billingham Synthonia	11	(0)
2006–200?	Marske United		
200?–2009	Billingham Town		
2009–2011	Blyth Spartans		
2011	Spennymoor Town		
2011	Blyth Spartans		
2011	→ Ashington (loan)	0	(0)
2011–2012	Norton & Stockton Ancients		
2012	Newcastle Benfield		
2012–2014	Marske United		(22)
2014–	Crook Town		
- * Club domestic league appearances and goals

John David Alexander (born 24 September 1985) is an English footballer who made four appearances in the Football League playing as a forward for Darlington in the 2000s. While still at Darlington, he had loan spells at Northern Premier League club Bishop Auckland, and went on to play non-league football in the north-east of England for a number of clubs, mostly in the Northern League. He also played American college soccer for the Stetson Hatters.

== Football career ==
Alexander was born in Middlesbrough, and despite receiving offers of a traineeship from Wolverhampton Wanderers and Burnley, began his football career in the youth system of Darlington in June 2002. He was included among the substitutes for the Division Three match against Carlisle United on 27 August, chosen in preference to the injured Danny Mellanby and the out-of-form Mark Sheeran, but remained unused. The 16-year-old Alexander was given his debut the following Saturday, as a second-half substitute in the visit to Kidderminster Harriers. He entered the game together with Neil Wainwright and Phil Hadland just after the home side had taken a lead, and the energy of the fresh players helped Darlington exert enough pressure to draw the match.

A trial with Premier League club Blackburn Rovers, in which he scored twice for their under-17 team against Tottenham Hotspur under-17s, came to nothing, and Alexander made no more first-team appearances before December, when he joined Northern Premier League club Bishop Auckland on loan. He returned to Darlington's first team in December 2003, when he made three appearances, each time as a late substitute. After another brief loan spell with Bishop Auckland, Alexander was released in April 2004 and signed for Billingham Synthonia.

He scored on his Northern League debut, against Dunston Federation, and finished the season with the club. He then took up a place at Stetson University, in DeLand, Florida, where he played college soccer for the Stetson Hatters. He helped them reach the 2004 Atlantic Sun Conference post-season tournament, but was sent off in the quarter-final match which the Hatters lost after two periods of overtime. He returned to Billingham Synthonia in January 2005, and took his total appearances for the club to 18, with two goals.

Alexander signed for Marske United in January 2006, and was Billingham Town's top Northern League scorer in 2008–09 with 21 goals. He joined Conference North club Blyth Spartans ahead of the next season, and scored six goals from 56 appearances in all competitions for them over two seasons. He then signed for Northern League champions Spennymoor Town, but only four weeks into the season and having scored four times already, he was transfer-listed and returned to Blyth. After four more games for Blyth, and a loan spell with Ashington during which he played once, in the Northern League Cup, Alexander signed for fellow Northern League club Norton & Stockton Ancients. In March, he made a sideways move to Newcastle Benfield, where he finished the season.

In 2012 pre-season, Alexander had a trial with former club Darlington, who had lost most of their players after administrative demotion to the Northern League, but no contract ensued, and he remained with Benfield until rejoining another former club, Marske United, in another sideways move in October. He was their top scorer in 2013–14 with 21 goals in all competitions, 14 in league matches, and started in the Northern League Cup final as Marske beat Whitley Bay 2–1 after extra time. In October 2014, he joined yet another Northern League club, Crook Town.
