= John D. Alexander (politician) =

Canadian politician (1903–1994)

Member of the Legislative Assembly of New Brunswick
- In office 1960–1963
- Constituency: Restigouche

Personal details
- Born: August 22, 1903 Campbellton, New Brunswick
- Died: June 23, 1994 (aged 90) New Brunswick
- Party: New Brunswick Liberal Association
- Spouse: Ruth Munroe Anslow
- Occupation: druggist

John Dow Alexander (August 22, 1903 – June 23, 1994) was a Canadian politician. He served in the Legislative Assembly of New Brunswick from 1960 to 1963 as a member of the Liberal party.
