= John Alexander (New South Wales colonial politician) =

Australian politician

John Alexander was an Australian politician.

He was a merchant who ran a firm in partnership with John Gilchrist and later with John Watt. He served in the New South Wales Legislative Council from 1856 to 1861. By the time he left the Council he was a squatter and acquired extensive pastoral land.
