= New South Wales gold rush =

1851–1880 gold rush in Australia

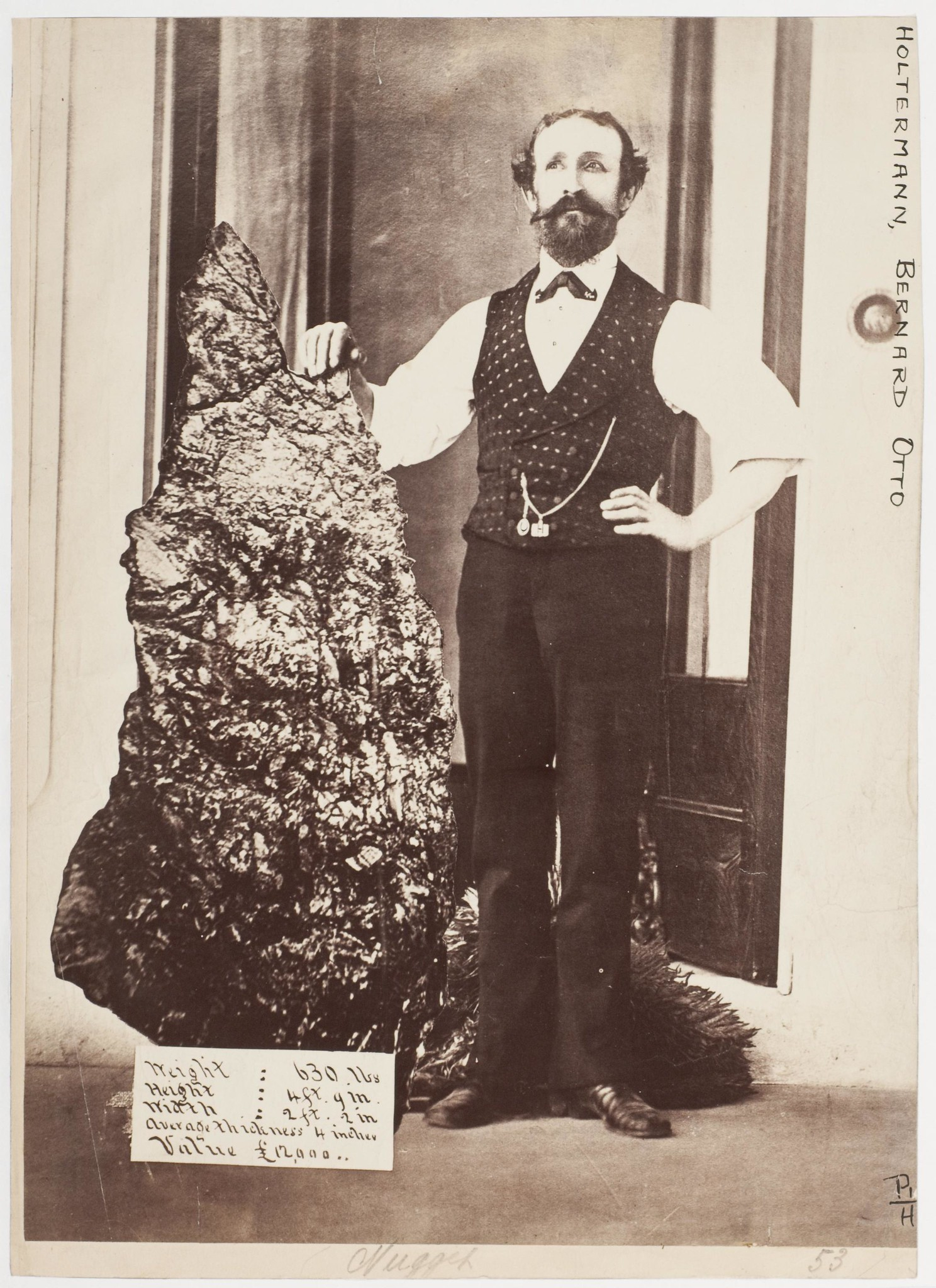
Holtermann with 235 kg gold specimen from Hill End, NSW

New South Wales experienced the first gold rush in Australia, a period generally accepted to lie between 1851 and 1880. This period in the history of New South Wales resulted in a rapid growth in the population and significant boost to the economy of the colony of New South Wales. The California Gold Rush three years prior signaled the impacts on society that gold fever would produce, both positive and negative. The New South Wales colonial government concealed the early discoveries, but various factors changed the policy.

== Background ==
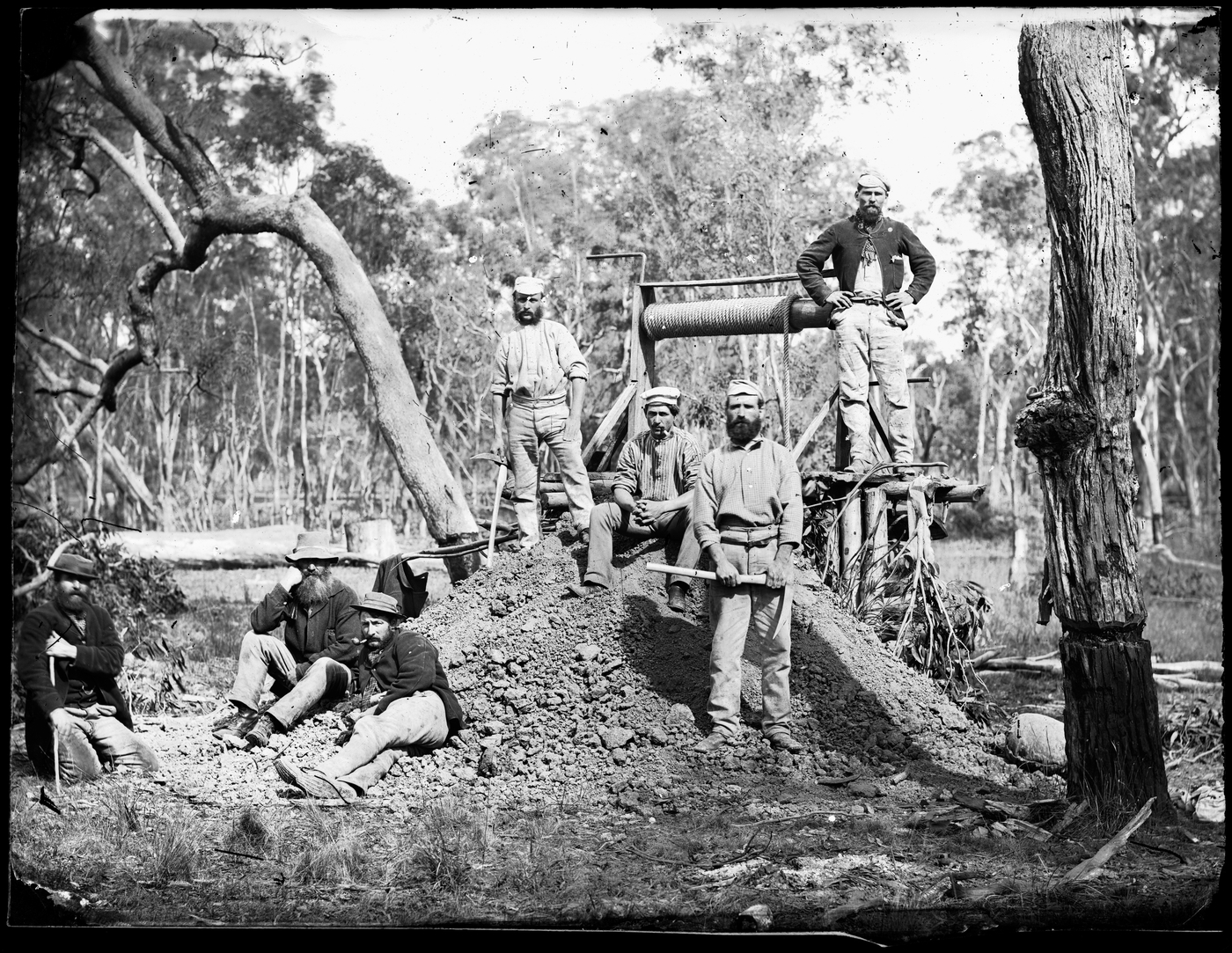
Gulgong Goldfield, New South Wales, 1872–1873, attributed to Henry Beaufoy Merlin

Gold was first officially discovered in Australia on 15 February 1823, by assistant surveyor James McBrien, at Fish River, between Rydal and Bathurst his field survey book "At E. (End of the survey line) 1 chain 50 links to river and marked a gum tree. At this place I found numerous particles of gold convenient to river". Then in 1839, Paweł Edmund Strzelecki geologist and explorer, discovered small amounts of gold in silicate at the Vale of Clwyd near Hartley, and in 1841 Reverend W. B. Clarke found gold on the Coxs River, both locations on the road to Bathurst.

The finds were suppressed by the colonial government to avoid a likely dislocation of the relatively small community. It was feared that convicts and free settlers would leave their assigned work locations to rush to the new find to seek their fortunes, in particular damaging the new pastoral industry. Reportedly Governor George Gipps said to Clarke when he exhibited his gold; "Put it away, Mr Clarke, or we shall all have our throats cut."

Recent evidence shows another find by William Tipple Smith - son of the English geologist William Smith - near Ophir in 1848 was also kept quiet until the government was ready to exploit the resource. William Tipple Smith was one of the owners of the Fitzroy Iron Works at Mittagong and, during a visit to it in late January 1849, Governor Charles Augustus FitzRoy was presented with a steel knife "mounted with colonial gold".

The Californian goldrush started in 1848 and immediately people began to leave Australia for California. To stem the exodus the New South Wales colonial government decided to alter its position and encourage the search for payable gold. In 1849 the colonial government sought approval of the Colonial Office in England to allow the exploitation of the mineral resources of New South Wales. A geologist was requested and this led to the appointment of Samuel Stutchbury. A reward was offered for the first person to find payable gold.

== Beginnings of the rush ==
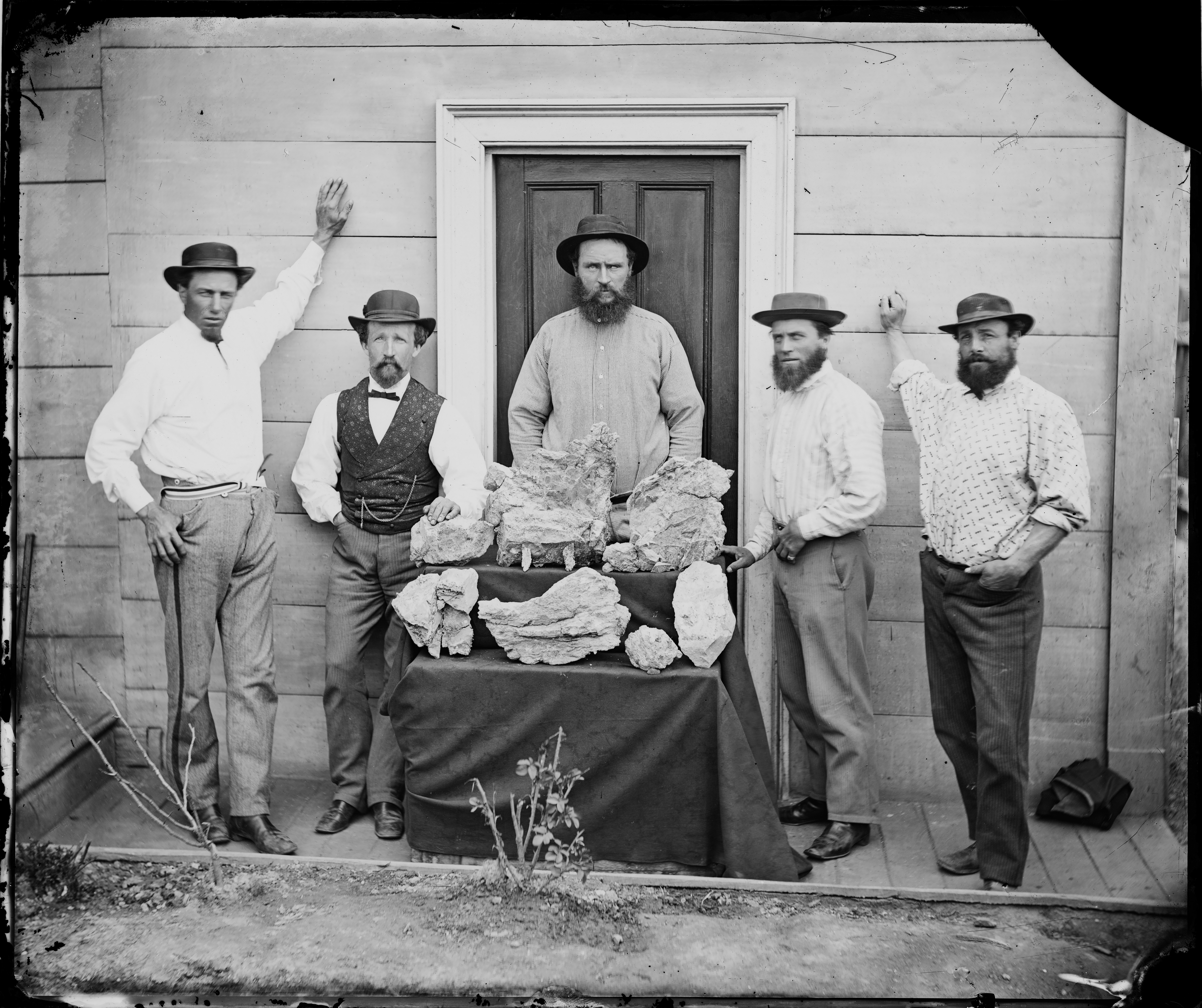
Bernhardt Holtermann (2nd from left), Richard Ormsby Kerr (centre) and Beyers (2nd from right), with reef gold from Star of Hope mine, 1872, attributed Henry Beaufoy Merlin

The discovery of gold was the discovery that changed a nation. Twenty-eight years after the Fish River discovery, a man named Edward Hargraves discovered a 'grain of gold' in a billabong near Bathurst in 1851.

Hargraves returned to New South Wales from the Californian goldfields where he was unsuccessful. Hargraves decided to begin searching for gold in the state of New South Wales. The geological features of the country around Bathurst, with its quartz outcrops and gullies, seemed similar to those of the Californian fields. In February 1851, Hargraves and his guide, John Lister, set out on horseback with a pan and rocking-cradle, to Lewis Ponds Creek, a tributary of the Macquarie River close to Bathurst. On 12 February 1851, they found gold at a place called Ophir named by William Tom's father after a region in the Old Testament noted for its fine gold. Hargraves said that "once in the creek bed he somehow felt surrounded by gold"....

Whilst Hargraves called Lister his "guide", there has been controversy as to whether it was John Lister and William Tom or Edward Hargraves who discovered the gold, with the Legislative Assembly select committee in 1890 determining in favour of Lister and Tom.

Initially keeping the find secret, Hargraves travelled to Sydney and met the Colonial Secretary in March. Soon the claim was recognised and Hargraves was appointed the "Commissioner of Lands". He received a £10,000 reward from the New South Wales government, as well as a life pension and a £5,000 reward from the Victorian government. Due to a dispute with his partners, some of the reward was withheld.

The find was proclaimed on 14 May 1851 and within days the first Australian gold rush began with 100 diggers searching for their gold. By June there were over 2,000 people digging around Bathurst, and thousands more were on their way. In 1852, the yield was 850,000 ounces (24½ tonnes). The Great Western Road to Bathurst became choked with men from all walks of life, with all they could carry to live and mine. The newspaper Bathurst Free Press reported on 17 May 1851: "A complete mental madness appears to have seized almost every member of the community. There has been a universal rush to the diggings."

Gold was found in other parts of New South Wales, very soon after the discovery at Ophir, particularly in the area around Braidwood, which also experienced a rush of gold-seekers.

Largely due to the gold receipts into the colonial government treasury bringing immense wealth to the colony of New South Wales, the British Government, in 1854, authorised the establishment of the Sydney Mint. This was the first Royal Mint to be established outside England.

Ten years after the start of the gold rush in 1851 the population of New South Wales had grown from 200,000 to 357,000 people, an increase of 78%.

A very productive gold field surrounded the area of Hill End. This was the location of the world's largest piece of gold-bearing material, a specimen of slate and gold weighing 235 kg, containing 85 kg (2,720 troy oz), known as Holtermann's Nugget, found by Bernhardt Holtermann in 1872.

== Social impact ==
The New South Wales gold rush caused major social and economic problems. Alcohol abuse was a common problem among the miners, who used the cheaply made spirits to mask the difficult living and working conditions. At one point the government attempted some order of control by banning the sale of alcohol on the diggings. This attempt was unsuccessful.

Supplies of food and hardware were in short supply and this raised the price to unrealistic levels. Workers able to operate businesses in the non-direct mining industry became in very short supply. As an example, the major service town of Bathurst was practically abandoned of able-bodied men for general commerce during the Ophir rush.

== Locations ==
Rushes of prospectors were experienced in the following localities:

- Bathurst, May 1851 [Ophir Goldfields]
- Sofala, Jun 1851 [Turon Goldfields]
- Bungonia, Jul 1851 (aka Shoalhaven)
- Hill End, Jul 1851
- Louisa Creek (now Hargraves) near Mudgee, Jul 1851
- Moruya, Jul 1851
- Araluen, Sep 1851 [Araluen & Bells Creek]
- Braidwood, Oct 1851 [Majors Creek]
- Bell's Point on the Bell River, Nov 1851
- Tuena, Nov 1851
- Near Lake George, 1851 [Carraway Flat & Black Swamp]
- Parshish 80 km south of Bathurst, 1851
- Oakey Creek near Coolah, 1851
- Monaro, 1851
- Hanging Rock, near Nundle (northern tablelands), 1851
- Adelong, 1852
- Sunny Corner, 1854
- Rocky River near Uralla, 1856
- Broulee, 1857, on the Araluen Field
- Mogo, 1858, on the Araluen Field
- Kiandra, 1859
- Young, 1860, known at that time as Lambing Flat
- Nerrigundah 1861
- Forbes, 1861
- Parkes, 1862
- Lucknow near Orange, 1862
- Grenfell 1866
- Gulgong, 1870
- Hillgrove, 1877
- Mount Drysdale near Cobar, 1892
- Mount McDonald near Wyangala, 1880
- Wyalong, 1893
- Yambulla near Eden, 1900

Gold mining continued at many locations within New South Wales, during the second half of the 19th century and first half of the 20th century.

== Simmering discontent and the Riot Act ==
Discontent among the diggers grew as the government imposed restrictions and fees on mining. A monthly fee of 30 shillings was difficult to pay when the size of the claim per miner allowed only 13½ surface square metres. At the Turon fields near Bathurst the diggers were threatening to riot if fees were not reduced. Governor Fitzroy agreed and cut the fee by two-thirds but refused to change the collection method, known as "digger hunts". This involved police raiding a gold field and seeking out diggers who had not paid their fees. The offending diggers would be removed and taken before a Magistrate fined £5 for the first offence and double for each subsequent offence.

Another aspect of discontent had a racial tone. Leading up to 1861 the population of Lambing Flat, now known as Young, grew to 20000. Of that number 2000 were recent Chinese immigrants and this created significant tension leading to a riot in 1861. The official Riot Act was read to the miners on 14 July 1861.

== 21st century gold ==
After a decline in production of gold in New South Wales throughout the mid-20th century a resurgence in gold production began in the 1980s due to improved techniques for exploration and mining and the high price of gold. The Cadia-Ridgeway Mine in the Central Tablelands includes Australia's largest underground mining operation. Another large scale open cut gold mine, Barrick Gold's Lake Cowal Mine, is also located in central New South Wales.

== See also ==
- Australian gold rushes
- Victorian gold rush
- Western Australian gold rushes
- Gold rush
- Klondike Gold Rush
- Colonial liberalism
