= List of government schools in New South Wales (C) =

Prior to 1848, most schools in New South Wales were operated by churches or private organisations, with some financial support from the government under the Denominational School Board, which was established in 1836. In January 1848, the Board of National Education began establishing government schools to develop a public education system, with the enactment and royal assent (16 August 1848) of the National Education Board Act 1848 (NSW). The first public school, Kempsey National School, opened that year, and by 1851, more than 37 public schools were in operation in New South Wales. As of 2025, the New South Wales Department of Education, a department of the Government of New South Wales, administers more than 2,200 public schools, both primary and secondary schools, across that state, that are in these lists:

== C ==
| Name | Suburb/Town | Region | Opened | Coordinates | Ref |
|---|---|---|---|---|---|
| Cabbage Tree Island Public School | Cabbage Tree Island | Northern Rivers | 1893 | 28°59′0.72″S 153°27′27.49″E | |
| Cabramatta High School | Cabramatta | South Western Sydney | 1958 | 33°53′58.03″S 150°55′47.02″E | |
| Cabramatta Public School | Cabramatta | South Western Sydney | 1897 | 33°53′42.76″S 150°56′32.13″E | |
| Cabramatta West Public School | Cabramatta | South Western Sydney | 1955 | 33°53′48.08″S 150°55′19.86″E | |
| Cabramurra Public School- | Cabramurra | Snowy Mountains | 1953 | 35°55′59.98″S 148°22′49.34″E | |
| Caddies Creek Public School | Glenwood | Greater West | 2003 | 33°44′10.78″S 150°55′38.34″E | |
| Cairnsfoot School | Brighton-Le-Sands | Southern Sydney | 1979 | 33°57′16.46″S 151°9′7.69″E | |
| Callaghan College Wallsend Campus | Wallsend | Newcastle | 2001 | 32°53′35.56″S 151°40′3.41″E | |
| Callaghan College – Waratah Campus | Waratah | Hunter | 2000 | 32°54′18.41″S 151°43′42.39″E | |
| Callaghan College – Jesmond Senior Campus | Jesmond | Hunter | 2000 | 32°54′5.12″S 151°41′40.88″E | |
| Callala Public School | Callala Bay | South Coast | 2000 | 34°59′42.98″S 150°42′51.02″E | |
| Cambewarra Public School | Cambewarra | South Coast | 1859 | 34°49′17.26″S 150°33′22.78″E | |
| Cambridge Gardens Public School | Cambridge Gardens | Greater West | 1978 | 33°44′14.28″S 150°43′19.3″E | |
| Cambridge Park High School | Cambridge Park | Greater West | 1976 | 33°45′7.85″S 150°43′57.87″E | |
| Cambridge Park Public School | Cambridge Park | Greater West | 1958 | 33°44′53.66″S 150°43′32.39″E | |
| Camden Haven High School | Kew | Mid North Coast | 2000 | 31°38′19.33″S 152°44′10.91″E | |
| Camden High School | Camden | Macarthur | 1956 | 34°4′45.75″S 150°40′33.76″E | |
| Camden Park Environmental Education Centre | Menangle | Greater West | 2000 | 34°7′15.63″S 150°42′7.43″E | |
| Camden Public School | Camden | Macarthur | 1849 | 34°3′8.51″S 150°41′39.28″E | |
| Camden South Public School | Camden | Macarthur | 1961 | 34°4′11.13″S 150°41′44.24″E | |
| Camdenville Public School | Newtown | Inner West | 1882 | 33°54′21.7″S 151°10′31.63″E | |
| Cammeray Public School | Cammeray | Lower North Shore | 1915 | 33°49′15.92″S 151°12′42.79″E | |
| Cammeraygal High School | Crows Nest | Lower North Shore | 2015 | S:33°49′38.56″S 151°12′24.4″E; MS:33°49′54.54″S 151°12′10.9″E | |
| Campbell House School | Glenfield | South Western Sydney | 1990 | 33°58′4.88″S 150°52′51.94″E | |
| Campbellfield Public School | Minto | South Western Sydney | 1978 | 34°2′18.18″S 150°50′53.24″E | |
| Campbelltown East Public School | Campbelltown | South Western Sydney | 1961 | 34°4′15.58″S 150°49′51.75″E | |
| Campbelltown Performing Arts High School | Campbelltown | Sydney | 1954 | 34°3′40.55″S 150°49′23.45″E | |
| Campbelltown North Public School | Campbelltown | South Western Sydney | 1959 | 34°3′44.8″S 150°49′33.5″E | |
| Campbelltown Public School | Campbelltown | South Western Sydney | 1875 | 34°4′13.13″S 150°48′56.63″E | |
| Campsie Public School | Campsie | South Western Sydney | 1908 | 33°54′44.53″S 151°6′17.85″E | |
| Candelo Public School | Candelo | South Coast | 1869 | 36°46′6.36″S 149°41′43.74″E | |
| Caniaba Public School | Caniaba | South Coast | 1912 | 28°49′51.14″S 153°13′51.47″E | |
| Canley Heights Public School | Canley Heights | South Western Sydney | 1955 | 33°53′4.99″S 150°55′21.54″E | |
| Canley Vale High School | Canley Vale | South Western Sydney | 1965 | 33°53′5.38″S 150°57′6.49″E | |
| Canley Vale Public School | Canley Vale | South Western Sydney | 1884 | 33°53′10.45″S 150°56′17.5″E | |
| Canobolas Public School | Orange | Central West | 1878 | 33°18′22.86″S 149°2′44.93″E | |
| Canobolas Rural Technology High School | Orange | Central West | 1968 | 33°17′26.42″S 149°7′21.94″E | |
| Canowindra High School | Canowindra | Central West | 1976 | 33°33′29.26″S 148°40′13.7″E | |
| Canowindra Public School | Canowindra | Central West | 1891 | 33°34′0.65″S 148°39′51.5″E | |
| Canterbury Boys High School | Canterbury | Inner West | 1918 | 33°54′18.32″S 151°7′26.89″E | |
| Canterbury Girls High School | Canterbury | Inner West | 1890 | 33°54′28.34″S 151°7′22.78″E | |
| Canterbury Public School | Canterbury | Inner West | 1878 | 33°54′30.81″S 151°7′22.67″E | |
| Canterbury South Public School | Canterbury | Inner West | 1926 | 33°55′4.64″S 151°6′57.29″E | |
| Capertee Public School | Capertee | Central West | 1882 | 33°8′49.32″S 149°59′10.37″E | |
| Captains Flat Public School | Captains Flat | Southern Tablelands | 1884 | 35°35′16.73″S 149°26′56.67″E | |
| Caragabal Public School | Caragabal | Central West | 1907 | 33°50′42.85″S 147°44′39.08″E | |
| Carcoar Public School | Carcoar | Central Tablelands | 1857 | 33°36′43.33″S 149°8′31.43″E | |
| Cardiff High School | Cardiff | Lake Macquarie | 1962 | 32°57′4.49″S 151°40′12.88″E | |
| Cardiff North Public School | Cardiff | Lake Macquarie | 1956 | 32°57′4.49″S 151°40′12.83″E | |
| Cardiff Public School | Cardiff | Lake Macquarie | 1891 | 32°56′46.13″S 151°39′28.02″E | |
| Cardiff South Public School | Cardiff South | Lake Macquarie | 1952 | 32°57′13.13″S 151°39′53.16″E | |
| Carenne School | Bathurst | Central Tablelands | 1961 | 33°25′31.99″S 149°33′59.57″E | |
| Cargo Public School | Cargo | Central West | 1871 | 33°25′40.76″S 148°48′28.24″E | |
| Carinda Public School | Carinda | Central West | 1895 | 30°27′40.28″S 147°41′17.11″E | |
| Caringbah High School | Caringbah | Southern Sydney | 1961 | 34°1′59.26″S 151°7′14.87″E | |
| Caringbah North Public School | Caringbah | Southern Sydney | 1955 | 34°2′11.33″S 151°7′26.48″E | |
| Caringbah Public School | Caringbah | Southern Sydney | 1925 | 34°3′12.41″S 151°7′19.09″E | |
| Carinya School | Mortdale | Southern Sydney | 1981 | 33°58′26.68″S 151°4′56.66″E | |
| Carlingford High School | Carlingford | Hills District | 1968 | 33°45′54.06″S 151°3′4.06″E | |
| Carlingford Public School | Carlingford | Hills District | 1883 | 33°46′46.96″S 151°3′18.39″E | |
| Carlingford West Public School | Carlingford | Hills District | 1967 | 33°46′55.35″S 151°2′16.59″E | |
| Carlton Public School | Bexley | Southern Sydney | 1918 | 33°57′48.85″S 151°7′22.16″E | |
| Carlton South Public School | Carlton | Southern Sydney | 1922 | 33°58′21.79″S 151°7′41.64″E | |
| Caroline Chisholm School | Padstow | South Western Sydney | 1966 | 33°58′21.79″S 151°7′41.64″E | |
| Carool Public School | Carool | Northern Rivers | 1922 | 28°13′48.02″S 153°25′45.11″E | |
| Carramar Public School | Carramar | South Western Sydney | 1924 | 33°53′6.91″S 150°58′11.62″E | |
| Carrathool Public School | Carrathool | Western Riverina | 1883 | 34°24′31.05″S 145°25′53.02″E | |
| Carrington Public School | Carrington | Newcastle | 1873 | 32°54′44.88″S 151°45′55.15″E | |
| Carroll Public School | Carroll | New England | 1869 | 30°59′8.62″S 150°26′51.08″E | |
| Cartwright Public School | Cartwright | South Western Sydney | 1966 | 33°55′28.64″S 150°53′25.49″E | |
| Cascade Environmental Education Centre | Cascade | Mid North Coast | 1990 | 30°14′0.5″S 152°47′21.67″E | |
| Casino High School | Casino | Northern Rivers | 1945 | 28°50′43.52″S 153°2′37.95″E | |
| Casino Public School | Casino | Northern Rivers | 1861 | 28°52′3.73″S 153°2′51.4″E | |
| Casino West Public School | Casino | Northern Rivers | 1952 | 28°51′19.49″S 153°2′14.27″E | |
| Cassilis Public School | Cassilis | Hunter Valley | 1875 | 32°0′18.02″S 149°58′39.87″E | |
| Castle Cove Public School | Castle Cove | Lower North Shore | 1952 | 33°46′57.66″S 151°12′6.76″E | |
| Castle Hill High School | Castle Hill | Greater West | 1963 | 33°43′35.69″S 150°59′58.31″E | |
| Castle Hill Public School | Castle Hill | Hills District | 1879 | 33°43′40.44″S 151°0′16.69″E | |
| Castlereagh Public School | Castlereagh | Greater West | 1858 | 33°40′3.69″S 150°40′35.75″E | |
| Casuarina School | Riverstone | Greater West | 2002 | 33°40′37.78″S 150°51′58.61″E | |
| Casula High School | Casula | South-Western Sydney | 1972 | 33°57′9.4″S 150°53′37.25″E | |
| Casula Public School | Casula | South-Western Sydney | 1859 | 33°56′36.62″S 150°54′32.54″E | |
| Cattai Public School | Cattai | Hills District | 1886 | 33°33′32.11″S 150°54′25.9″E | |
| Caves Beach Public School | Caves Beach | Lake Macquarie | 1968 | 33°6′14.23″S 151°38′17.27″E | |
| Cawdor Public School | Cawdor | Greater West | 1858 | 34°6′36.22″S 150°40′25.51″E | |
| Cecil Hills High School | Cecil Hills | South Western Sydney | 1996 | 33°53′45″S 150°51′2″E | |
| Cecil Hills Public School | Cecil Hills | Greater West | 2003 | 33°53′19.03″S 150°51′5.74″E | |
| Centaur Public School | Banora Point | Far North Coast | 1994 | 28°12′55.43″S 153°31′35.77″E | |
| Centennial Park School | Randwick | Eastern Sydney | 1947 | 33°54′38.52″S 151°14′35.9″E | |
| Central Mangrove Public School | Central Mangrove | Central Coast | 1957 | 33°17′49.01″S 151°14′37.57″E | |
| Central Sydney Intensive English High School | Alexandria | Inner Sydney | 2002 | 33°53′59.43″S 151°11′37.92″E | |
| Central Tilba Public School | Central Tilba | South Coast | 1900 | 36°18′56.32″S 150°4′18.92″E | |
| Cessnock East Public School | Cessnock | Hunter Valley | 1928 | 32°49′39.8″S 151°22′10.31″E | |
| Cessnock High School | Cessnock | Hunter Valley | 1937 | 32°50′30.9″S 151°22′10.71″E | |
| Cessnock Public School | Cessnock | Hunter Valley | 1859 | 32°50′25.14″S 151°21′49.75″E | |
| Cessnock West Public School | Cessnock | Hunter Valley | 1920 | 32°50′25.11″S 151°21′49.71″E | |
| Chalmers Road School | Strathfield | Inner West | 1920 | 33°52′46.64″S 151°4′54.62″E | |
| Chandler Public School | Wollomombi | New England | 1881 | 30°31′6.38″S 152°3′12.08″E | |
| Charlestown East Public School | Charlestown | Lake Macquarie | 1959 | 32°58′16.84″S 151°42′16.46″E | |
| Charlestown Public School | Charlestown | Lake Macquarie | 1879 | 32°57′55.86″S 151°41′49.59″E | |
| Charlestown South Public School | Charlestown | Lake Macquarie | 1963 | 32°58′5.06″S 151°41′18.72″E | |
| Chatham High School | Taree | Mid North Coast | 1966 | 31°53′47.28″S 152°28′48.37″E | |
| Chatham Public School | Taree | Mid North Coast | 1953 | 31°54′0.37″S 152°28′57.37″E | |
| Chatswood High School | Chatswood | Lower North Shore | 1959 | 33°47′56.77″S 151°10′31.15″E | |
| Chatswood Public School | Chatswood | Lower North Shore | 1883 | 33°47′52.7″S 151°10′44.72″E | |
| Chatsworth Island Public School | Chatsworth Island | Northern Rivers | 1885 | 29°23′16.6″S 153°13′53.65″E | |
| Cheltenham Girls High School | Cheltenham | Upper North Shore | 1958 | 33°45′25.48″S 151°4′27.81″E | |
| Cherrybrook Public School | Cherrybrook | Hills District | 1971 | 33°43′53.32″S 151°2′35.87″E | |
| Cherrybrook Technology High School | Cherrybrook | Upper North Shore | 1992 | 33°43′11.63″S 151°2′16.43″E | |
| Chertsey Primary School | Springfield | Central Coast | 1968 | 33°25′46.23″S 151°22′7.31″E | |
| Chester Hill High School | Chester Hill | South Western Sydney | 1962 | 33°52′30.37″S 150°59′39.29″E | |
| Chester Hill North Public School | Chester Hill | South Western Sydney | 1958 | 33°52′22.61″S 151°0′1.91″E | |
| Chester Hill Public School | Chester Hill | South Western Sydney | 1962 | 33°53′11.27″S 151°0′5.74″E | |
| Chifley College Bidwill Campus | Bidwill | Western Sydney | 1979 | 33°44′1.29″S 150°49′37.37″E | |
| Chifley College Dunheved Campus | North St Marys | Western Sydney | 1973 | 33°45′0.41″S 150°46′56.31″E | |
| Chifley College Mount Druitt Campus | Mount Druitt | Greater West | 2000 | 33°44′43″S 150°48′46.34″E | |
| Chifley College Senior Campus | Mount Druitt | Greater West | 2000 | 33°46′12.8″S 150°49′48.54″E | |
| Chifley College Shalvey Campus | Shalvey | Greater West | 1974 | 33°43′53.03″S 150°48′29.22″E | |
| Chifley Public School | Chifley | Eastern Sydney | 1962 | 33°57′58.1″S 151°14′32.38″E | |
| Chillingham Public School | Chillingham | Northern Rivers | 190 | 28°18′43.12″S 153°16′32″E | |
| Chipping Norton Public School | Chipping Norton | South-Western Sydney | 1920 | 33°54′32.28″S 150°57′39.17″E | |
| Chittaway Bay Public School | Chittaway Bay | Central Coast | 1982 | 33°19′34.34″S 151°25′53.68″E | |
| Chullora Public School | Greenacre | South-Western Sydney | 1952 | 33°53′41.27″S 151°3′37.52″E | |
| Clairgate Public School | St Clair | Greater West | 1981 | 33°47′47.5″S 150°47′57.02″E | |
| Clare Public School | Clare | Far West | 1985 | 33°24′4.42″S 143°56′40.92″E | |
| Claremont Meadows Public School | Claremont Meadows | Greater West | 1997 | 33°46′27.78″S 150°44′46.69″E | |
| Clarence Town Public School | Clarence Town | Hunter | 1849 | 32°35′20.09″S 151°46′35″E | |
| Clarke Road School | Hornsby | Upper North Shore | 1973 | 33°42′43.93″S 151°5′44.68″E | |
| Claymore Public School | Claymore | South Western Sydney | 1980 | 34°2′37.41″S 150°48′33.52″E | |
| Clemton Park Public School | Earlwood | Inner West | 1929 | 33°55′47.11″S 151°6′32.72″E | |
| Clergate Public School | Clergate | Central West | 1879 | 33°11′30.94″S 149°6′45.89″E | |
| Clovelly Public School | Clovelly | Eastern Sydney | 1913 | 33°54′26.81″S 151°15′35.54″E | |
| Clunes Public School | Clunes | Northern Rivers | 1883 | 28°43′30.95″S 153°24′32.06″E | |
| Coal Point Public School | Coal Point | Hunter | 1955 | 33°2′28.82″S 151°36′36.98″E | |
| Cobar High School | Cobar | Far West | 1966 | 31°30′8.35″S 145°49′38.09″E | |
| Cobar Public School | Cobar | Far West | 1878 | 31°30′5.32″S 145°50′12.29″E | |
| Cobargo Public School | Cobargo | Far South Coast | 1871 | 36°23′14.14″S 149°52′59.33″E | |
| Cobbitty Public School | Cobbitty | Macarthur | 1882 | 34°0′56.96″S 150°41′9.44″E | |
| Coffee Camp Public School | Coffee Camp | Northern Rivers | 1910 | 28°39′45.25″S 153°13′13.37″E | |
| Coffs Harbour High School | Coffs Harbour | Mid North Coast | 1938 | 30°18′18.44″S 153°8′10.56″E | |
| Coffs Harbour Public School | Coffs Harbour | Mid North Coast | 1885 | 30°18′8.78″S 153°7′15.22″E | |
| Coffs Harbour Senior College | Coffs Harbour | Mid North Coast | 1995 | 30°19′33.34″S 153°6′5.42″E | |
| Coleambally Central School | Coleambally | Riverina | 1963 | 34°48′17.57″S 145°53′0.81″E | |
| Coledale Public School | Coledale | Illawarra | 1912 | 34°17′22.41″S 150°56′49.29″E | |
| Collarenebri Central School | Collarenebri | North West Slopes | 1885 | 29°32′36.43″S 148°34′42.33″E | |
| Collaroy Plateau Public School | Collaroy Plateau | Northern Beaches | 1954 | 33°43′57.14″S 151°17′34.61″E | |
| Collector Public School | Collector | Southern Tablelands | 1866 | 34°54′51.35″S 149°25′59.18″E | |
| Collins Creek Public School | Collins Creek | Northern Rivers | 1918 | 28°29′21.64″S 153°1′21.11″E | |
| Colo Heights Public School | Colo Heights | Greater West | 1939 | 33°22′22.32″S 150°44′23.16″E | |
| Colo High School | North Richmond | Greater West | 1978 | 33°34′7.25″S 150°42′33.07″E | |
| Colo Vale Public School | Colo Vale | Southern Highlands | 1882 | 34°24′2.75″S 150°28′35.45″E | |
| Colyton High School | Colyton | Greater Western Sydney | 1967 | 33°46′44.36″S 150°47′52.52″E | |
| Colyton Public School | Mount Druitt | Greater Western Sydney | 1861 | 33°46′37.61″S 150°48′47.24″E | |
| Comboyne Public School | Comboyne | Mid North Coast | 1922 | 31°36′20.51″S 152°28′20.5″E | |
| Comleroy Road Public School | Kurrajong | Blue Mountains | 1880 | 33°30′23.62″S 150°41′47.07″E | |
| Como Public School | Como | Southern Sydney | 1884 | 34°0′6.51″S 151°4′7.87″E | |
| Como West Public School | Como | Southern Sydney | 1950 | 34°0′18.01″S 151°3′37.81″E | |
| Conargo Public School | Conargo | Riverina | 1877 | 35°18′20.64″S 145°10′43.6″E | |
| Concord High School | Concord | Inner West | 1981 | 33°51′50.34″S 151°6′32.58″E | |
| Concord Public School | Concord | Inner West | 1880 | 33°51′47.74″S 151°6′25.34″E | |
| Concord West Public School | Concord West | Inner West | 1929 | 33°50′23.64″S 151°5′12.59″E | |
| Condell Park High School | Condell Park | South-Western Sydney | 1963 | 33°55′26.66″S 151°0′8.99″E | |
| Condell Park Public School | Condell Park | South-Western Sydney | 1950 | 33°55′32.37″S 151°0′48.95″E | |
| Condobolin High School | Condobolin | Far West | 1867 | 33°5′29.09″S 147°8′36.97″E | |
| Condobolin Public School | Condobolin | Far West | 1872 | 33°5′6.42″S 147°8′56.62″E | |
| Condong Public School | Condong | Northern Rivers | 1888 | 28°18′35.08″S 153°26′4.91″E | |
| Congewai Public School | Congewai | Hunter | 1888 | 32°57′30.45″S 151°16′27.11″E | |
| Coniston Public School | Coniston | Illawarra | 1921 | 34°26′19.15″S 150°53′12.47″E | |
| Connells Point Public School | Connells Point | St George | 1934 | 33°59′8.24″S 151°5′58.73″E | |
| Conservatorium High School | Sydney | Sydney CBD | 1918 | 33°51′48.64″S 151°12′51.65″E | |
| Cooerwull Public School | Lithgow | Central West | 1867 | 33°29′2.35″S 150°8′29.48″E | |
| Coogee Public School | Coogee | Eastern Sydney | 1876 | 33°55′13.59″S 151°14′59.63″E | |
| Cook School | Loftus | Southern Sydney | 2002 | 34°2′23.61″S 151°3′10.52″E | |
| Coolah Central School | Coolah | Central West | 1868 | 31°49′18.34″S 149°43′22.93″E | |
| Coolamon Central School | Coolman | Riverina | 1884 | 34°48′42.22″S 147°12′2.92″E | |
| Coolongolook Public School | Coolongolook | Mid North Coast | 1884 | 32°13′21.2″S 152°19′8.21″E | |
| Cooma North Public School | Cooma | Monaro | 1953 | 36°13′5.17″S 149°7′48.95″E | |
| Cooma Public School | Cooma | Monaro | 1863 | 36°14′13.86″S 149°7′32.28″E | |
| Coomealla High School | Dareton | Far West | 1975 | 34°5′42.89″S 142°3′34.44″E | |
| Coonabarabran High School | Coonabarabran | Central West | 1962 | 31°16′58.83″S 149°17′2.32″E | |
| Coonabarabran Public School | Coonabarabran | Central West | 1870 | 31°16′46.19″S 149°16′50.64″E | |
| Coonamble High School | Coonamble | Orana | 1968 | 30°57′18.52″S 148°23′28.22″E | |
| Coonamble Public School | Coonamble | Orana | 1867 | 30°57′33.16″S 148°23′13.06″E | |
| Coopernook Public School | Coopernook | Mid North Coast | 1875 | 31°49′39.52″S 152°36′34.06″E | |
| Coorabell Public School | Coorabell | Northern Rivers | 1891 | 28°37′34.46″S 153°29′15.07″E | |
| Cooranbong Public School | Cooranbong | Hunter | 1861 | 33°4′50.97″S 151°26′28.2″E | |
| Cootamundra High School | Cootamundra | Riverina | 1955 | 34°38′7.61″S 148°1′8.87″E | |
| Cootamundra Public School | Cootamundra | South West Slopes | 1875 | 34°38′18.25″S 148°1′34.82″E | |
| Copacabana Public School | Copacabana | Central Coast | 1983 | 33°29′5.2″S 151°26′11.32″E | |
| Copmanhurst Public School | Copmanhurst | Clarence Valley | 1891 | 29°35′4.69″S 152°46′32.38″E | |
| Coraki Public School | Coraki | Northern Rivers | 1868 | 28°59′34.39″S 153°16′56.05″E | |
| Coramba Public School | Coramba | Northern Rivers | 1988 | 30°13′16.45″S 153°0′41.3″E | |
| Coreen School | Blacktown | Greater West | 1970 | 33°46′25.87″S 150°54′39.35″E | |
| Corindi Public School | Corindi Beach | Northern Rivers | 1884 | 30°1′17.12″S 153°11′37.19″E | |
| Corndale Public School | Corndale | Northern Rivers | 1889 | 28°42′47.66″S 153°21′46.16″E | |
| Corowa High School | Corowa | Riverina | 1965 | 35°59′37.33″S 146°22′51.12″E | |
| Corowa Public School | Corowa | Riverina | 1878 | 35°59′31.83″S 146°23′38.26″E | |
| Corowa South Public School | Corowa | Riverina | 2016 | 36°1′16.04″S 146°22′33.09″E | |
| Corrimal East Public School | East Corrimal | Illawarra | 1952 | 34°22′40.13″S 150°54′21.83″E | |
| Corrimal High School | East Corrimal | Illawarra | 1951 | 34°22′33.99″S 150°54′38.9″E | |
| Corrimal Public School | Corrimal | Illawarra | 1890 | 34°22′4.86″S 150°53′58.01″E | |
| Coutts Crossing Public School | Coutts Crossing | Clarence Valley | 1913 | 29°49′55.03″S 152°53′22″E | |
| Cowan Public School | Cowan | Northern Sydney | 1939 | 33°35′19.96″S 151°10′7.96″E | |
| Cowper Public School | Cowan | Northern Sydney | 1939 | 29°34′10.78″S 153°4′39.6″E | |
| Cowra High School | Cowra | Central West | 1942 | 33°48′53.93″S 148°41′18.64″E | |
| Cowra Public School | Cowra | Central West | 1858 | 33°50′11.36″S 148°41′24.24″E | |
| Crabbes Creek Public School | Crabbes Creek | Northern Rivers | 1898 | 28°27′22.29″S 153°29′48.13″E | |
| Cranebrook High School | Cranebrook | Greater West | 1989 | 33°43′15.94″S 150°42′37.15″E | |
| Crawford Public School | Doonside | Greater West | 1977 | 33°45′19.1″S 150°52′8.01″E | |
| Crescent Head Public School | Crescent Head | Mid North Coast | 1921 | 31°11′20.34″S 152°58′15.2″E | |
| Crestwood High School | Baulkham Hills | Greater West | 1981 | 33°44′38.64″S 150°58′30.14″E | |
| Crestwood Public School | Crestwood | Greater West | 1972 | 33°44′56.83″S 150°58′19.3″E | |
| Cringila Public School | Cringila | Illawarra | 1957 | 34°28′17.39″S 150°52′11.92″E | |
| Cromehurst School | Lindfield | Northern Sydney | 1954 | 33°46′25.85″S 151°10′20.68″E | |
| Cromer Public School | Cromer | Northern Beaches | 1962 | 33°44′16.63″S 151°16′27.02″E | |
| Cronulla High School | Cronulla | Southern Sydney | 1961 | 34°2′23.5″S 151°9′27.73″E | |
| Cronulla Public School | Cronulla | Southern Sydney | 1910 | 34°3′12.81″S 151°8′50.61″E | |
| Cronulla South Public School | Cronulla | Southern Sydney | 1943 | 34°3′57.75″S 151°9′15.64″E | |
| Crookwell High School | Crookwell | Southern Tablelands | 1968 | 34°27′6.92″S 149°27′59.81″E | |
| Crookwell Public School | Crookwell | Southern Tablelands | 1863 | 34°27′35.72″S 149°28′11.47″E | |
| Croppa Creek Public School | Croppa Creek | North West Slopes | 1949 | 29°7′31.3″S 150°18′33.45″E | |
| Crossmaglen Public School | Crossmaglen | Mid North Coast | 1936 | 30°21′57.82″S 152°58′53.93″E | |
| Crown Street Public School | Surry Hills | City of Sydney | 1849 | 33°52′55.48″S 151°12′56.37″E | |
| Croydon Park Public School | Croydon Park | Inner West | 1986 | 33°53′41.25″S 151°6′31.07″E | |
| Croydon Public School | Croydon | Inner West | 1884 | 33°53′41.22″S 151°6′31.15″E | |
| Crystal Creek Public School | Crystal Creek | Far North Coast | 1895 | 28°18′43.19″S 153°19′32.98″E | |
| Cudal Public School | Cudal | Central West | 1876 | 33°17′14.1″S 148°44′24.49″E | |
| Cudgegong Valley Public School | Mudgee | Central West | 1984 | 32°36′23.84″S 149°35′2.75″E | |
| Cudgen Public School | Cudgen | Northern Rivers | 1882 | 28°15′45.82″S 153°33′20.44″E | |
| Culburra Public School | Culburra Beach | South Coast | 1976 | 34°55′59.2″S 150°45′39.8″E | |
| Culcairn Public School | Culcairn | Riverina | 1883 | 35°40′3.77″S 147°2′23.72″E | |
| Cullen Bullen Public School | Cullen Bullen | Central Tablelands | 1875 | 33°17′59.9″S 150°1′56.56″E | |
| Cumberland High School | Carlingford | Greater West | 1962 | 33°47′6.35″S 151°2′16.72″E | |
| Cumnock Public School | Cumnock | Central West | 1879 | 32°55′53.35″S 148°45′0.23″E | |
| Cundletown Public School | Cundletown | Mid North Coast | 1857 | 31°54′1.55″S 152°31′19.75″E | |
| Curl Curl North Public School | North Curl Curl | Northern Beaches | 1951 | 33°45′51.9″S 151°17′18.62″E | |
| Curlewis Public School | Curlewis | North West Slopes | 1885 | 31°7′2.17″S 150°15′50.26″E | |
| Currabubula Public School | Currabubula | North West Slopes | 1882 | 31°15′46.19″S 150°44′7.11″E 23 October 2026 | |
| Curran Public School | Macquarie Fields | South-Western Sydney | 1975 | 33°59′36.04″S 150°53′56.73″E | |
| Currans Hill Public School | Currans Hill | Macarthur | 2001 | 33°59′36.04″S 150°53′56.73″E | |

== See also ==
Organisations

- Education in New South Wales
- New South Wales Education Standards Authority
- Australian Curriculum

Lists

- List of schools in New South Wales
- List of government schools in New South Wales
- List of non-government schools in New South Wales
- List of selective high schools in New South Wales
- List of Catholic schools in New South Wales
- List of Anglican schools in New South Wales
- List of Islamic schools in New South Wales
- Lists of schools in Australia
