= Herons Creek, New South Wales =

Herons Creek
- Town
- Coordinates: 31°35′S 152°44′E
- Country: Australia
- State: New South Wales
- City: Camden Haven
- LGA: Port Macquarie-Hastings Council

Government
  - State electorate: Port Macquarie
  - Federal division: Lyne

Population
  - Total: 246 (SAL 2021)

Herons Creek is a small township on the North Coast of New South Wales, Australia co-ordinates 31°35′S 152°44′E. The population of Herons Creek is 247 (2016). The township is about 291 kilometres (181 miles) north of Sydney. The North Coast railway line passes through, and a station existed at the site between 1917 and 1974. Film director Baz Luhrmann was raised in the town.

== Economy ==
The largest employer in Herons Creek is the timber mill owned and operated by Boral. The mill in its current form was opened by Alf Noone in 1915. It was sold to Zinc Co. of Broken Hill in 1947, later passing to Duncans Holdings and then Boral. The train station was closed 30 June 1974 causing the local economy to decline.

In the 1800s there was a tramway known as "The Turpentine Line" that ran from Herons Creek to Kew (Federal mill) where there was also a factory extracting eucalyptus oil.

== Civil society ==
Herons Creek Cemetery was surveyed on 29 September 1888, but this was later revoked and the current surveyed site was approved on 25 August 1911. From the Pacific Highway at Herons Creek, turn west onto Herons Creek Road and follow it for 1 km to the cemetery entrance. The cemetery is closed for burials except for existing rights. A list of inscriptions can be found via Australian Cemeteries Index.

The only formal place of worship in Herons Creek is the Heritage Chapel at 49 Blackbutt Road. This building began as St. Mary the Virgin Anglican Church in 1927, fell into disuse, and was restored in 2011 by new owners. Non-denominational services are currently held on the 2nd Sunday of every month at 9:37am.

Herons Creek Public School was founded in 1893 and continues to serve the local community.

== Transportation ==
There are no public transport services to Herons Creek itself, but school buses service the school. The nearest access points via public transport are Kew (bus) and Kendall (XPT train).

== Educational facilities ==
Herons Creek Public School is the only educational facility in Herons Creek. The nearest high school is Camden Haven High School in the neighbouring town of Kew.
