= Chatham High School (New South Wales) =

Location
- Taree, Mid North Coast region, New South Wales; Australia; 31°53′46″S 152°28′50″E

Information
- Type: Government-funded co-educational comprehensive secondary day school
- Motto: Latin: Semper Intrepidi (Ever undaunted)
- Established: 31 March 1966; 60 years ago
- School district: Taree; Regional North
- Educational authority: NSW Department of Education
- Principal: Daryl Irvine
- Teaching staff: 54 FTE (2018)
- Years: 7–12
- Enrolment: 569 (2018)
- Campus type: Regional
- Colours: Bottle green, grey and white
- Slogan: Guudji Yiigu Nyura... Welcome All
- Website: chatham-h.schools.nsw.gov.au

Chatham High School is a government-funded co-educational comprehensive secondary day school, located in Taree, in the Mid North Coast region of New South Wales, Australia.

Established in 1966, the school catered for approximately 570 students in 2018, from Year 7 to Year 12, of whom 32 percent identified as Indigenous Australians and three percent were from a language background other than English. The school is operated by the NSW Department of Education; the principal is Daryl Irvine.

== Overview ==
Chatham High School was the second high school in Taree, having opened its doors on 31 March 1966. The school now provides a broad school curriculum as well as cultural and sporting pursuits. Subjects include vocational studies for job training and traditional academic subjects for entry into tertiary education. An alternative timetable for senior students increases access to Technical and Further Education (TAFE) and vocational courses.

Chatham High School is a Priority Schools Program-funded school that supports the development of literacy and numeracy skills for all students.

A Support Unit provides educational services for students with special needs.

== History ==
Planning on Chatham High School began in the early 1960s after the public school's P & C Association saw a need for a new local high school when Taree High School became overcrowded. Chatham High School was established in February 1965, with 280 pupils and 14 teachers located at Taree High School. Students first moved into the current location on Thursday, 31 March 1966.

== Motto and emblem ==
The motto of Chatham High School (as depicted on the school crest) is the Latin: Semper Intrepidi, which is translated as "ever undaunted".

The griffin is a legendary animal with the body of a lion and the head and wings of an eagle. The lion being the king of the beasts and the Eagle the king of the birds. During World War I and World War II soldiers from the local area were part of the 33rd battalion carried the Griffin as a sign of courage. Griffins guard treasure and priceless artifacts and possessions, i.e. it guards the precious students at the school.

== 2008 fire ==
On 9 March 2008, a group of youths from the Taree area attempted to set fire to nearby St Clare's High School, a nearby supermarket, and two buildings at Chatham High. Damage inflicted in most of these arson attacks amounted to little more than some singed carpets, melted linoleum and a few broken windows; but at approximately 2:30am the fire took hold in a ground level textiles laboratory in Chatham High's "E Block", resulting in the destruction of the building.

E Block comprised two mathematics staffrooms, a computing staffroom, home economics staffroom and the general staff common room. Classrooms contained within the block also included two computing laboratories, several commercial kitchens, textiles labs, numerous science labs and a number of general teaching spaces used predominantly by the maths faculty. The block also contained storerooms which held practical resources, as well as irreplaceable intellectual material.

Students were asked to remain at home on the following Monday and Tuesday, as both a forensic and arson unit from Sydney were brought up to survey the area and ensure it was fit to be demolished and reconstructed from the ground up. Within two months, the school had managed to erect several demountable classrooms, intended to temporarily replace those that were burnt down. Construction of a replacement building began in late 2009.

== See also ==
- List of government schools in New South Wales (C)
- List of schools in the Northern Rivers and Mid North Coast
- Education in Australia
