= Cabramatta High School =

Location
- 17 Aladore Avenue, Cabramatta, New South Wales; Australia; 33°53′59″S 150°55′45″E

Information
- Type: Government-funded co-educational comprehensive secondary day school
- Established: January 1958; 68 years ago
- Educational authority: New South Wales Department of Education
- Oversight: NSW Education Standards Authority
- Years: 7–12
- Campus type: Suburban
- Website: cabramatta-h.schools.nsw.gov.au

Cabramatta High School is a public high school located in Cabramatta, a south-western suburb of Sydney, New South Wales, Australia.

== See also ==
- List of government schools in New South Wales (C)
- Education in Australia
