= Orange High School (New South Wales) =

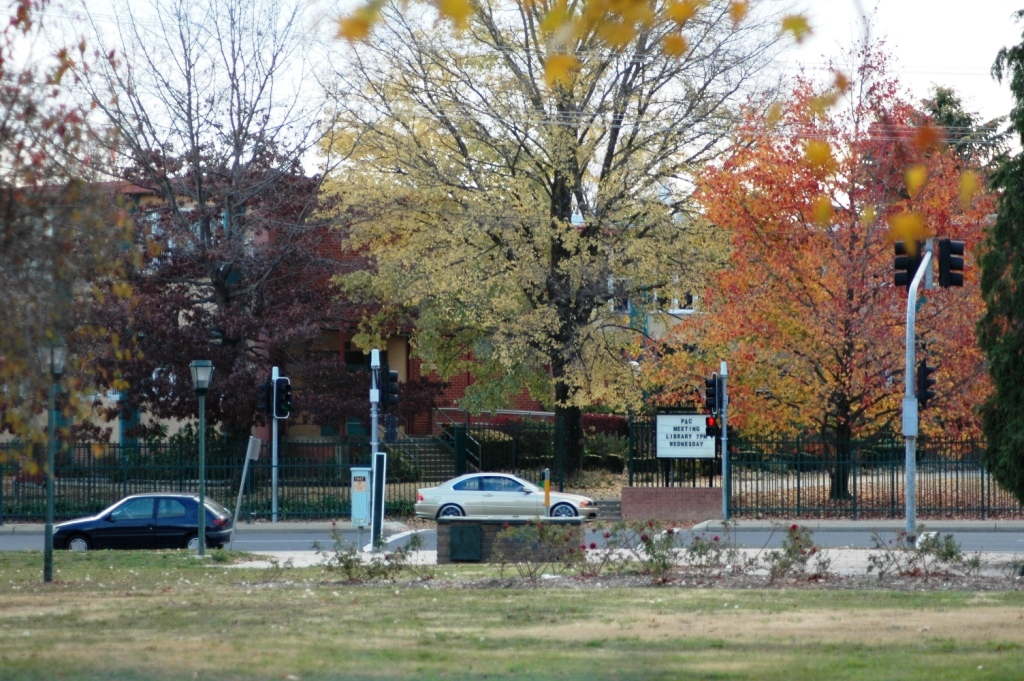
- Front entrance of school

Location
- Woodward Street, Orange, Central West, New South Wales; Australia; 33°16′50″S 149°5′7″E

Information
- Type: Government-funded co-educational comprehensive secondary day school
- Motto: Honour the past, create the future
- Established: 1912; 114 years ago
- School district: Orange; Rural South and West
- Educational authority: NSW Department of Education
- Principal: Alison McLennan
- Teaching staff: 79.2 FTE (2025)
- Years: 7–12
- Enrolment: 914 (2025)
- Campus: Regional
- Colours: Black and gold
- Website: orange-h.schools.nsw.gov.au

Orange High School is a government-funded co-educational comprehensive secondary day school, located in Orange, a city in the Central West region of New South Wales, Australia.

Established in 1912, the school enrolls approximately 1100 students from Year 7 to Year 12, of whom ten percent identified as Indigenous Australians The school is operated by the NSW Department of Education; and prepares students for the NSW Higher School Certificate (Year 12). The principal is Alison McLennan (REL).

== History ==
Founded in 1912, Orange High School was the first public secondary school to be established in western New South Wales, and is one of two government secondary schools located in the city of Orange, the other being The Canobolas Rural Technology High School. The school's first classes were held in the School of Arts building, now the site of the Police and Community Youth Club in Byng Street. The school then moved to purpose-built facilities on the corner of March Street and Sale Street, which are now part of the TAFE complex.

Amongst the decisions made in the first year were for the school colours to be black and gold, the design of the school badge and the motto, "Quod Potero Sedulo" (translated from Latin as "Whatever I can do, I will do to the best of my ability"). The motto was later changed to "Honour the past, create the future".

Students were housed at the March Street school from 1913 through until 1958, at which time the High School and Rural School were merged. The current school buildings, sited on Woodward Street near the western end of the main street, Summer Street, were opened on 13 November 1959. During the opening ceremony, the Principal, Mr O'Sullivan, stated that in 1913 the total number of students enrolled was 93 with six teachers on staff.

As of 2025, the school caters for just under 1,100 students and has 70 teaching staff.

== Co-curriculum ==
=== Music ===
The school has a music department and stages frequent concerts. It had a stage band, which was regarded as one of the best in the state. In addition to the stage band, the school had a concert band, a choir, and other smaller ensembles. The stage band was placed first in division 2, two years running, at the South Australian Mount Gambier Generations in Jazz Festival some time ago.

=== Sport ===
Students at Orange High School may choose to participate in a variety of sporting activities, including cricket, netball, rugby union, rugby league, soccer, softball, aerobics, badminton, and lawn bowls. The school participates in statewide competitions and maintains links with the traditional "Astley Cup" and "Malyney Shield".

All students take part in swimming and athletics carnivals, and the school also enters students in weekend competitions, including netball, hockey, softball and triathlon.

== House system ==
As with most Australian schools, Orange High School has a house system for sport and administrative purposes. Students are divided into four houses upon their enrolment:

- Bourke (dark green) – This house is named after Richard Bourke
- Elliott (yellow) – This house is named after Jock Elliott
- Macquarie (dark blue) – This house is named after Lachlan Macquarie
- Parkes (red) – This house is named after Henry Parkes

== Notable alumni ==
- Murray Cook – children's performer as a member of The Wiggles (also attended Endeavour High School)
- Sir Charles Cutler – former politician; Former NSW Deputy Premier and Country Party leader
- David Foster – novelist, essayist, poet and farmer (also attended Armidale High School and Fort Street High School)
- Tim Gartrell – Australian Labor Party National Secretary. Gartrell was the school captain in 1988.
- Lisa Lackey – actress; roles in Home and Away from 1992 to 1995 and in NBCs series Heroes, Mulholland Drive
- Garry West – former politician; public affairs consultant

== See also ==
- List of government schools in New South Wales
- Education in Australia
