= Canobolas Rural Technology High School =

Location
- Icely Road, Orange, Central West, New South Wales; Australia; 33°17′30″S 149°07′19″E

Information
- Other name: Canobolas High School
- Former name: East Orange High School
- Type: Government-funded co-educational comprehensive secondary day school
- Established: 1966; 60 years ago (as East Orange High School)
- School district: Orange; Rural South and West
- Educational authority: NSW Department of Education
- Principal: Charles Gauci
- Teaching staff: 57.7 FTE (2018)
- Years: 7–12
- Enrolment: 628 (2018)
- Colors: Green and white
- Website: canobolas-h.schools.nsw.gov.au

The Canobolas Rural Technology High School, also known as Canobolas High School, is a government-funded co-educational comprehensive secondary day school, located in Orange, a rural city located in the Central West region of New South Wales, Australia.

Named after Mount Canobolas and founded in 1966, the school enrolled approximately 630 students in 2018, from Year 7 to Year 12, of whom approximately 35 percent identified as Indigenous Australians and five percent were from a language background other than English. The school is operated by the NSW Department of Education.

== History ==
Orange was expanding in the mid-1960s, at which time its only government secondary school was Orange High School located in the city's west, so the decision was made to establish a second government high school, to be located in the city's east.

The new high school was established in 1966 but lacked a campus, so the first batch of students entering First Form (Year 7) took lessons at Orange High School and were kept separate from other students. This meant there were two parallel sets of Year 7 classes. The new school was originally called East Orange High School and in 1967 operated from a former infants school on Sale Street in what is now the Orange Cultural Centre. The school's name was changed to Canobolas High School when it moved to its current location on Icely Road on 23 March 1968, as the site provided a view of Mount Canobolas and was previously part of Canobolas Shire. The school had a strong multicultural composition as many European migrants had settled in Orange after World War II and housing was built for them in the city's east.

Canobolas High School was officially opened on 7 December 1968 by NSW Deputy Premier and Minister for Education and Science, Charles Cutler ED. The school's first principal was Fred Dobbin, who later served three terms as mayor of Orange. In 1967, the school had 339 pupils and 16 staff. By 1974, it had 815 pupils and 47 staff.

Canobolas High School started with three buildings: A, B and C blocks, and initially lacked landscaping. Some of the school's early students helped to plant trees to provide windbreaks and landscaping, and to block the view of Orange City General Cemetery.

== Logo and motto ==
The school's logo is modeled on the atom. The school's motto is "Truth Through Knowledge".

== Healthy canteen ==
Canobolas Rural Technology High School was in 2015 one of three NSW schools selected to take part in a new healthier eating policy introduced by the state government.

The school gained nationwide media attention when the canteen doubled its sales after offering fresh fruit, vegetables and other health foods as alternatives to unhealthy traditional Australian school canteen foods such as meat pies and sausage rolls.

== See also ==
- List of government schools in New South Wales (C)
- Education in Australia
