= Kew, New South Wales =

Kew Camden Haven, New South Wales
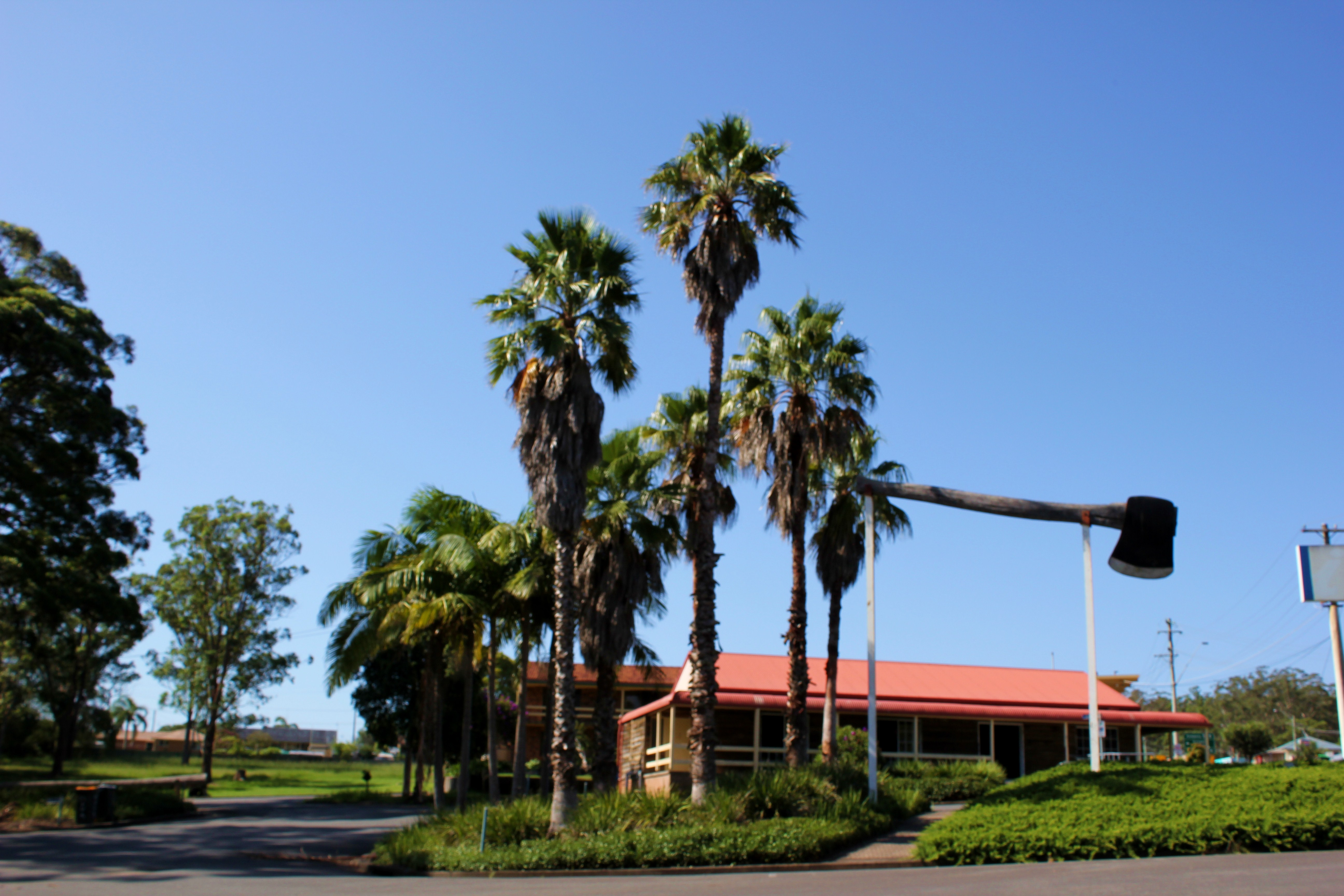
- The Big Axe and iKew Visitor Information Centre, 2013

- Coordinates: 31°38′S 152°43′E
- Population: 1,761 (2021 census)
  - Density: 96.76/km^{2} (250.6/sq mi)
- Postcode(s): 2439
- Area: 18.2 km^{2} (7.0 sq mi)
- Location: 351 km (218 mi) N of Sydney; 48 km (30 mi) N of Taree; 33 km (21 mi) S of Port Macquarie City Centre
- LGA(s): Port Macquarie-Hastings Council
- County: Macquarie County
- State electorate(s): Port Macquarie
- Federal division(s): Lyne

Kew (/kjuː/) is a small town in the Mid North Coast region of New South Wales, Australia in the Port Macquarie-Hastings Council local government area. Kew is one of the communities that make up the Camden Haven district of Port Macquarie-Hastings.

Kew is located at the intersection of Nancy Bird Walton Drive (the former Pacific Highway) and Ocean Drive, the road to the larger town of Laurieton. Kew has a visitor information centre, a pub, a post office, a motel, a roadhouse, and a general store. Traffic congestion along this stretch of the highway led to the construction of a new dual carriageway bypass of Kew to the east of the township as part of a highway upgrade from Coopernook to Herons Creek. Construction commenced in November 2007 and was completed in December 2009.

The largest school in the district, Camden Haven High School, is located 2 km east of Kew on Ocean Drive.

Kew is home to the Big Axe.

Kew Country Club is both a bowling and golf club and is located 200 metres west of the roundabout where Nancy Bird Walton Drive and Ocean Drive intersect. The club has a lawn bowling green and two synthetic bowling greens. The golf course is eighteen holes with bent grass greens. Kew is served by several daily coaches along the Pacific Highway, and three NSW TrainLink XPT services at Kendall railway station on the North Coast Line 2 km to the west.

== Population ==
In the 2016 Census, there were 1,089 people in Kew. 77.9% of people were born in Australia and 87.1% of people spoke only English at home. The most common responses for religion were Anglican 29.3%, No Religion 23.2% and Catholic 19.4%.

== Notable people ==
- Nancy Bird Walton (1915 – 2009), world-famous aviator

== See also ==
- Kew (New South Wales) travel guide from Wikivoyage
- Media related to Kew, New South Wales at Wikimedia Commons
