= Camden Haven High School =

Location
- Kew, near Laurieton, Mid North Coast region of New South Wales; Australia; 31°38′20″S 152°44′11″E

Information
- Type: Government-funded co-educational comprehensive secondary day school
- Motto: Aim for the Highest
- Established: 2000; 26 years ago
- School district: Hastings; Regional North
- Educational authority: NSW Department of Education
- Principal: Margaret Hutchinson
- Teaching staff: 141.3 FTE (2024)
- Years: 7–12
- Enrolment: 901 (2024)
- Campus type: Regional
- Colours: Navy, jade and sky blue
- Website: camdenhave-h.schools.nsw.gov.au

Camden Haven High School (abbreviated as CHHS) is a government-funded co-educational comprehensive secondary day school, located in Kew, a village near Laurieton, in the Mid North Coast region of New South Wales, Australia. The school is situated approximately two kilometres (one mile) east of the Pacific Highway. The Aboriginal country the school is built on is Birpai Country.

== History ==
Established in 2000, the school catered for approximately 900 students in 2024, from Year 7 to Year 12, of whom fourteen percent identified as Indigenous Australians and three percent were from a language background other than English. The school is operated by the NSW Department of Education; the principal is Margaret Hutchinson.

== Overview ==
A united school culture has been developed by establishing across school management, curriculum and special programs working teams. The school was formed from an amalgamation of the high school section of Kendall Central School and the distance education centre located, at the time, in Port Macquarie. Kendall Central School became Kendall Public School.

Face-to-face students are drawn from the local Camden Haven region. Students enrolled in the Distance Education School are located in the region from the Central Coast to Coffs Harbour and inland to the New England Highway, (Armidale and Tamworth) as well as from Lord Howe and Norfolk Islands. Face-to-face students are able to enrol in the Distance Education School when face-to-face class numbers in a specific subject are too low. e.g. languages.

CHHS has a reputation in achieving significant results, particularly in the performing arts and sport.

== See also ==
- List of government schools in New South Wales (C)
- List of schools in the Northern Rivers and Mid North Coast
- Education in Australia
