= Orange, New South Wales =

Orange
- City
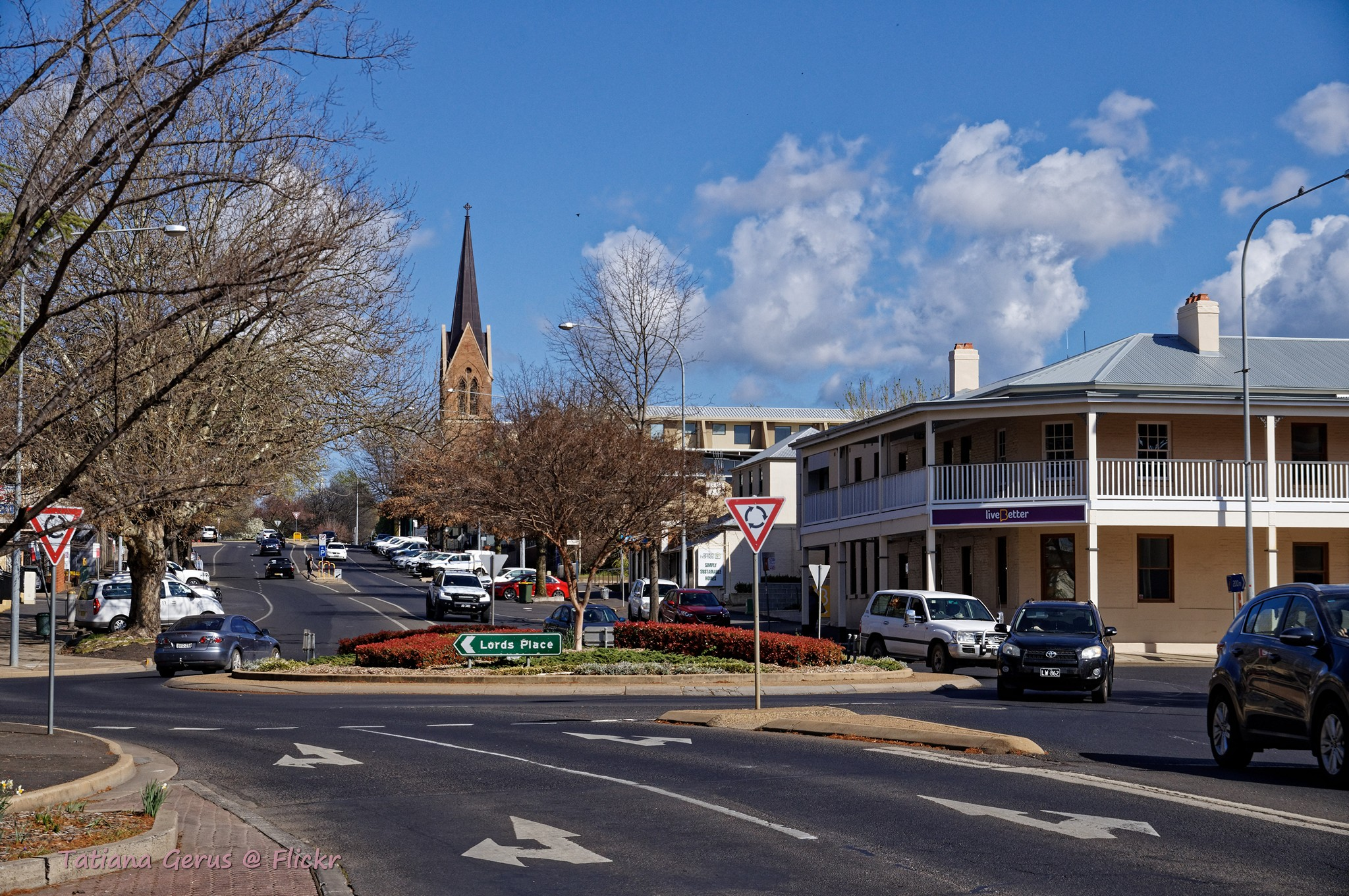
- Byng Street

- Interactive map of Orange
- Coordinates: 33°17′0″S 149°06′0″E
- Country: Australia
- State: New South Wales
- Region: Central West
- LGA: City of Orange
- Location: 254 km (158 mi) W of Sydney; 56 km (35 mi) W of Bathurst; 280 km (170 mi) N of Canberra; 150 km (93 mi) SE of Dubbo; 100 km (62 mi) E of Parkes
- Established: 1846

Government
  - State electorate: Orange
  - Federal division: Calare
- Elevation: 863.2 m (2,832 ft)

Population
  - Total: 41,920 (2021) (38th)
- Postcode: 2800
- County: Wellington, Bathurst
- Mean max temp: 18.0 °C (64.4 °F)
- Mean min temp: 7.2 °C (45.0 °F)
- Annual rainfall: 927.2 mm (36.50 in)
Localities around Orange
Molong
	Orange	Bathurst
Canowindra	Blayney

Orange is a city on the western edge of the Central Tablelands region in New South Wales, Australia. It is 254 km (158 mi) west of the state capital, Sydney [206 km (128 mi) on a great circle], at an altitude of 862 metres (2,828 ft). Orange had an urban population of 41,920 at the 2021 Census, making the city a significant regional centre. A significant nearby landmark is Mount Canobolas with a peak elevation of 1,395 m (4,577 ft) AHD and commanding views of the district. Orange is situated within the traditional lands of the Wiradyuri Nation.

Orange was the birthplace of poets Banjo Paterson and Kenneth Slessor, although Paterson lived in Orange for only a short time as an infant. Walter W. Stone, book publisher (Wentworth Books) and passionate supporter of Australian literature, was also born in Orange. The first Australian Touring Car Championship, known today as the Supercars Championship, was held at the Gnoo Blas Motor Racing Circuit in 1960.

== History ==
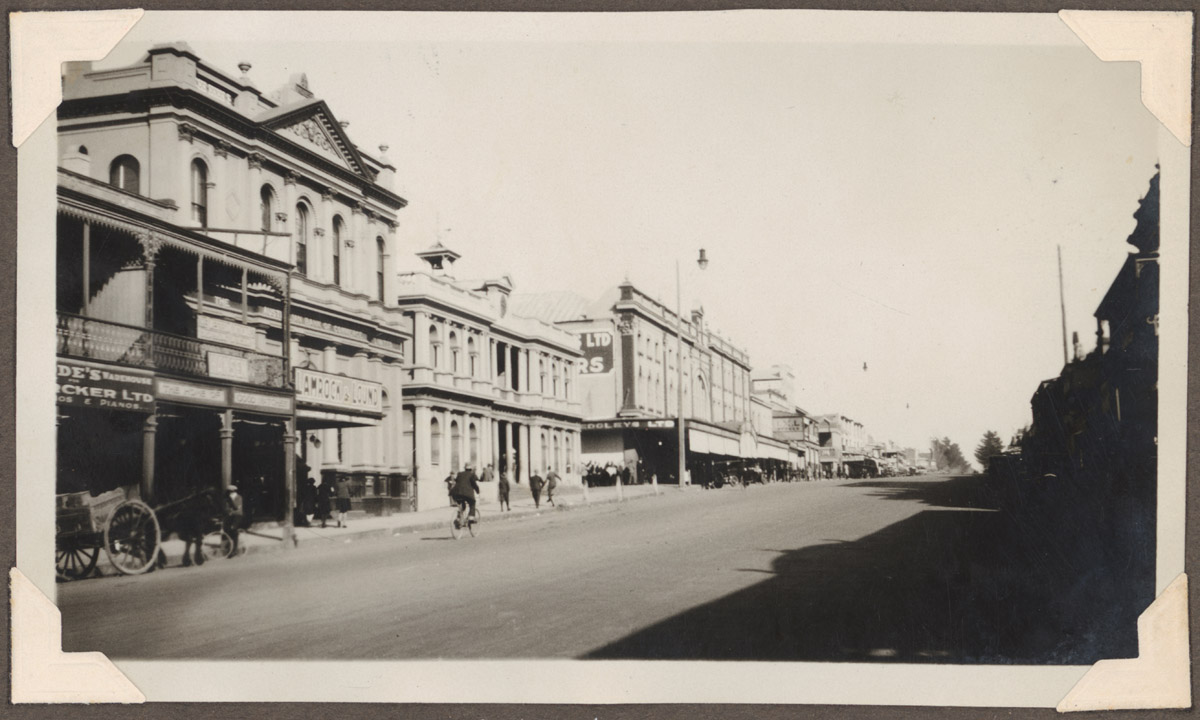
Summer Street in 1929

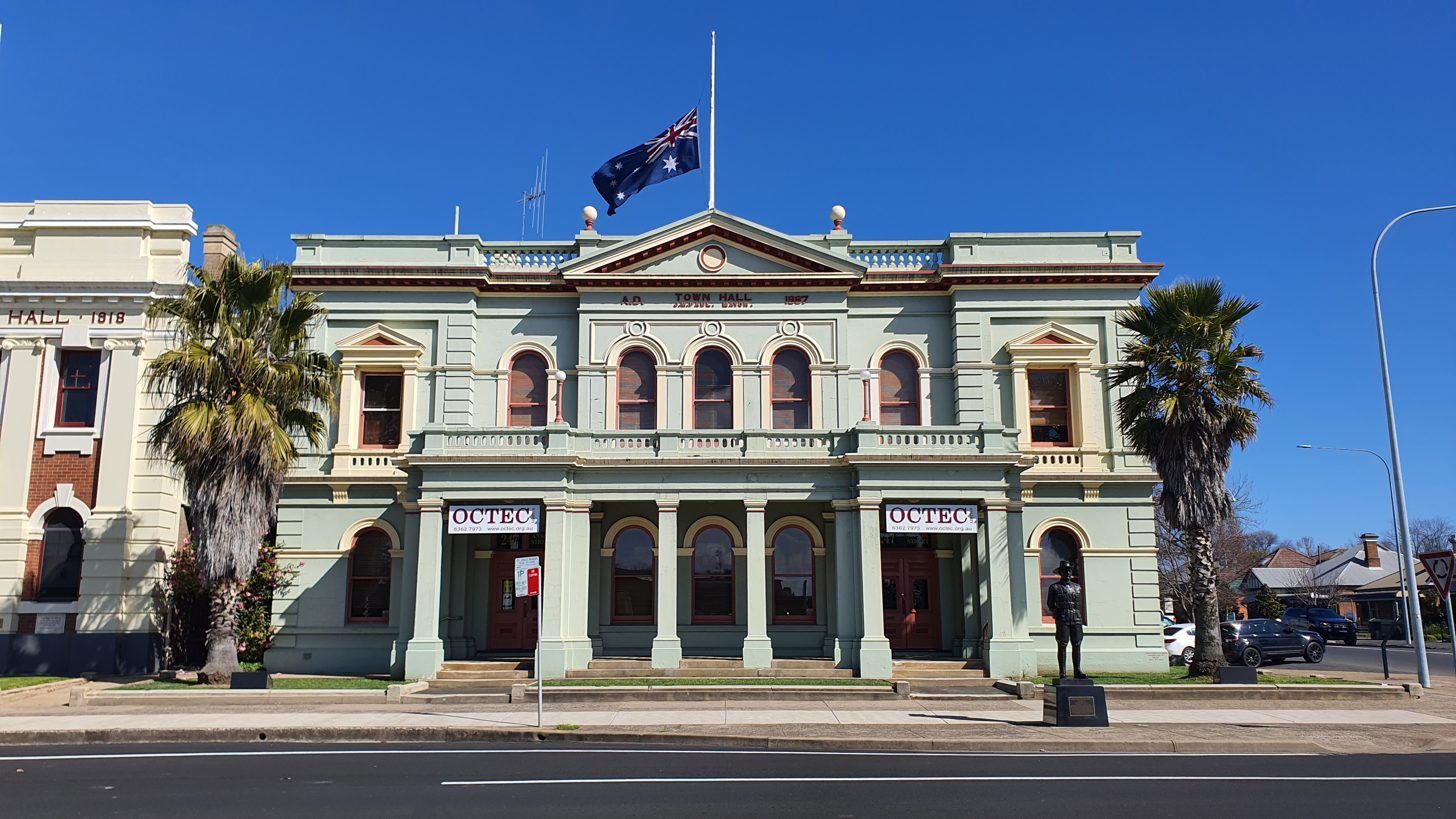
Orange Town Hall

The Orange region is the traditional land of the Wiradjuri people. Known as the people of the three rivers, the Wiradjuri people have inhabited New South Wales for at least 60,000 years.

In 1822 Captain Percy Simpson arrived in the Wellington District and established a convict settlement which was called "Blackman's Swamp" after James Blackman; Simpson had employed James Blackman as a guide because he had already accompanied an earlier explorer, John Oxley into that region.

In the late 1821s, the surveyor J. B. Richards worked on a survey of the Macquarie River below Bathurst and also of the road to Wellington. On a plan dated around the early 1830s or late 1820s, he indicated a village reserve, in the parish of Orange. Sir Thomas Mitchell named the parish Orange, as he had been an associate of the Prince of Orange in the Peninsular War, when both were aides-de-camp to the Duke of Wellington, whose title was bestowed on the valley to the west by Oxley.

Initial occupation by graziers began in late 1829, and tiny settlements eventually turned into larger towns as properties came into connection with the road. In 1844, the surveyor Davidson was sent to check on encroachments onto the land reserved for a village, and to advise on the location for a township. His choices were Frederick's Valley, Pretty Plains, or Blackman's Swamp.

Blackman's Swamp was chosen, and it was proclaimed a village and named Orange by Major Thomas Mitchell in 1846 in honour of Prince William of Orange. At nearby Ophir, a significant gold find in Australia was made in 1851, resulting in a sporadic population movement which is known as the Australian gold rush. Additional gold finds in nearby areas led to the establishment of Orange as a central trading centre for the gold.

The growth of Orange continued as the conditions were well suited for agriculture, and in 1860 it was proclaimed a municipality. The railway from Sydney reached Orange in 1877. In 1946, 100 years after it was first being established as a village, Orange was proclaimed as a minor city.

Orange was proposed as a site for Australia's national capital city, prior to the selection of Canberra. The new capital city would have adjoined the town of Orange, which would have been included in the surrounding federal territory.

== Geography and Climate ==
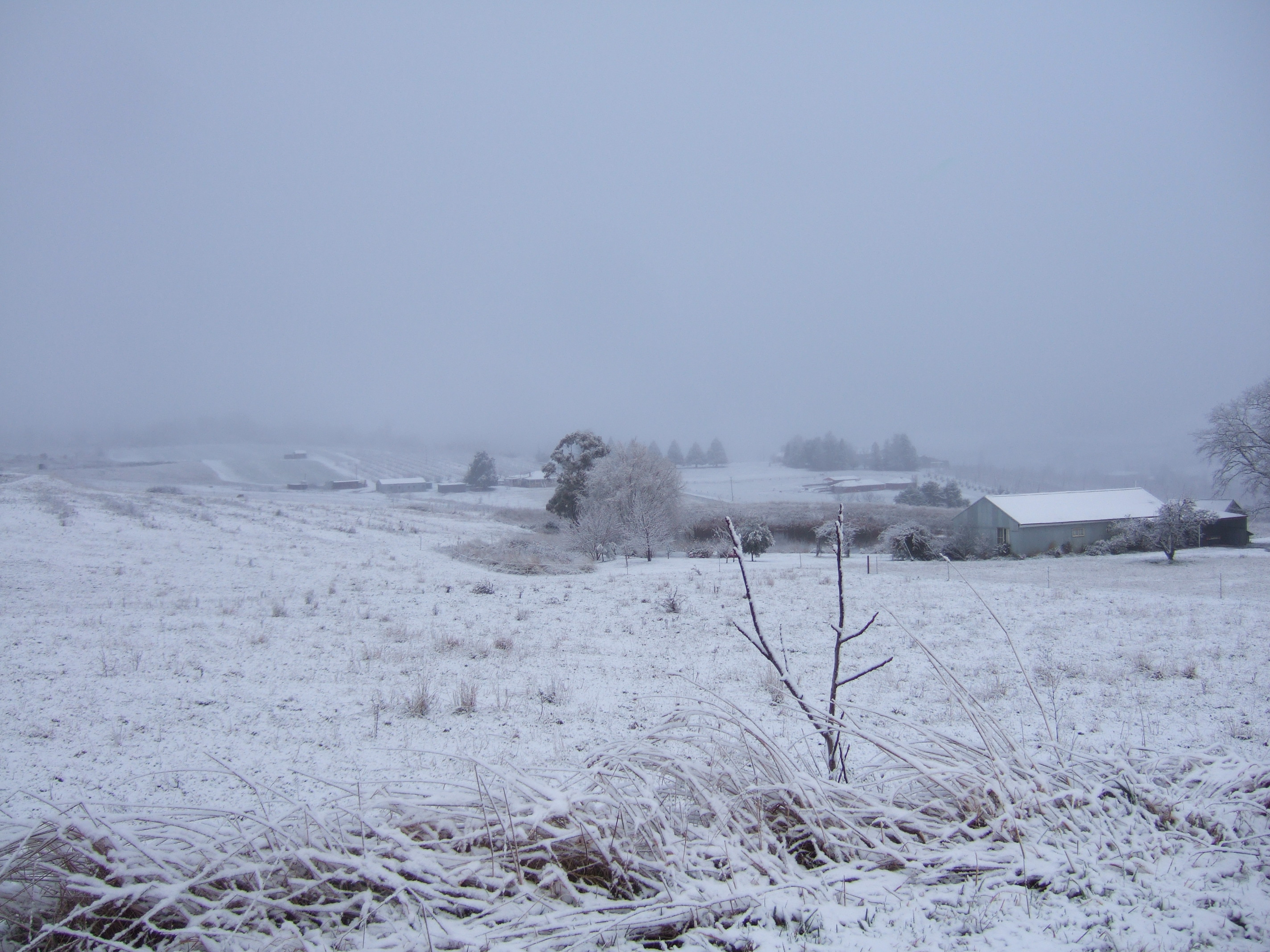
Snow-covered fields in Orange during an early snowfall in May 2005.

A saucer magnolia tree in bloom in spring in Orange

Owing to its altitude, Orange has a temperate oceanic climate (Köppen Cfb), with warm summers (though with cool mornings) and cold, wet winters with frequent morning frosts. The city is relatively wet for an inland location owing to the orographic lifting brought on by Mount Canobolas, especially during the cooler months when snow falls; Orange is the snowiest major city in Australia.

Compared with most population centres in Australia it has colder winters, especially in terms of its daytime maximum temperatures, owing to its elevation and westerly exposure. In summer, the average (and absolute) maximum temperatures are also lower than in most inland centres. Humidity is low in the summer months with the afternoon dew point typically around 10 °C (50 °F). The city features 99.8 clear days annually, with the majority of sunshine in the summer months, in sharp contrast to Sydney which has more sunshine in winter due to the foehn effect.

The climate has enabled the area to be a major apple and pear producer, and a centre for cool-weather wine production.

Climate data for Orange Agricultural Institute (1976–2024); 922 m AMSL; 33.32° S, 149.08° E
Month	Jan	Feb	Mar	Apr	May	Jun	Jul	Aug	Sep	Oct	Nov	Dec	Year
Record high °C (°F)	37.3 (99.1)	39.2 (102.6)	33.8 (92.8)	29.4 (84.9)	21.6 (70.9)	18.0 (64.4)	16.5 (61.7)	21.8 (71.2)	25.7 (78.3)	31.3 (88.3)	36.0 (96.8)	35.0 (95.0)	39.2 (102.6)
Mean daily maximum °C (°F)	26.6 (79.9)	25.7 (78.3)	22.6 (72.7)	18.4 (65.1)	14.2 (57.6)	10.5 (50.9)	9.5 (49.1)	11.0 (51.8)	14.1 (57.4)	17.6 (63.7)	21.1 (70.0)	24.3 (75.7)	18.0 (64.4)
Mean daily minimum °C (°F)	13.4 (56.1)	13.2 (55.8)	10.7 (51.3)	7.2 (45.0)	4.6 (40.3)	2.6 (36.7)	1.5 (34.7)	2.1 (35.8)	4.2 (39.6)	6.6 (43.9)	9.2 (48.6)	11.2 (52.2)	7.2 (45.0)
Record low °C (°F)	1.0 (33.8)	2.8 (37.0)	1.0 (33.8)	−1.6 (29.1)	−4.0 (24.8)	−5.0 (23.0)	−5.8 (21.6)	−4.2 (24.4)	−5.4 (22.3)	−2.0 (28.4)	−0.4 (31.3)	0.5 (32.9)	−5.8 (21.6)
Average precipitation mm (inches)	86.2 (3.39)	74.7 (2.94)	68.5 (2.70)	54.4 (2.14)	67.0 (2.64)	73.5 (2.89)	89.0 (3.50)	94.9 (3.74)	80.1 (3.15)	79.2 (3.12)	81.7 (3.22)	79.0 (3.11)	927.2 (36.50)
Average precipitation days (≥ 0.2 mm)	8.3	7.3	7.8	7.4	10.4	13.1	14.7	13.5	10.8	9.4	9.8	8.1	120.6
Mean monthly sunshine hours	300.7	257.1	251.1	225.0	182.9	147.0	161.2	201.5	225.0	266.6	270.0	300.7	2,788.8

Climate data for Orange Airport AWS (1996–2024); 945 m AMSL; 33.38° S, 149.13° E
Month	Jan	Feb	Mar	Apr	May	Jun	Jul	Aug	Sep	Oct	Nov	Dec	Year
Record high °C (°F)	38.6 (101.5)	40.1 (104.2)	34.5 (94.1)	28.6 (83.5)	21.5 (70.7)	18.6 (65.5)	16.3 (61.3)	19.5 (67.1)	26.8 (80.2)	28.9 (84.0)	37.9 (100.2)	38.9 (102.0)	40.1 (104.2)
Mean daily maximum °C (°F)	27.4 (81.3)	25.9 (78.6)	23.0 (73.4)	18.6 (65.5)	13.9 (57.0)	10.8 (51.4)	9.8 (49.6)	11.2 (52.2)	14.8 (58.6)	18.3 (64.9)	21.6 (70.9)	24.8 (76.6)	18.3 (65.0)
Mean daily minimum °C (°F)	12.9 (55.2)	12.4 (54.3)	9.9 (49.8)	5.6 (42.1)	2.5 (36.5)	1.3 (34.3)	0.5 (32.9)	0.9 (33.6)	3.2 (37.8)	5.7 (42.3)	8.4 (47.1)	10.5 (50.9)	6.2 (43.1)
Record low °C (°F)	1.1 (34.0)	1.3 (34.3)	−0.5 (31.1)	−4.6 (23.7)	−6.6 (20.1)	−8.3 (17.1)	−7.7 (18.1)	−6.2 (20.8)	−5.5 (22.1)	−3.0 (26.6)	−1.7 (28.9)	−0.5 (31.1)	−8.3 (17.1)
Average precipitation mm (inches)	67.6 (2.66)	75.8 (2.98)	79.5 (3.13)	47.4 (1.87)	50.8 (2.00)	77.4 (3.05)	76.1 (3.00)	86.7 (3.41)	80.6 (3.17)	74.2 (2.92)	94.1 (3.70)	83.6 (3.29)	889.8 (35.03)
Average precipitation days (≥ 0.2 mm)	8.6	7.7	8.4	7.7	12.8	18.2	18.6	15.9	11.7	9.5	10.0	8.9	138.0
Average afternoon relative humidity (%)	41	48	47	51	60	69	70	62	57	52	50	40	54
Source: Australian Bureau of Meteorology

== Economy ==
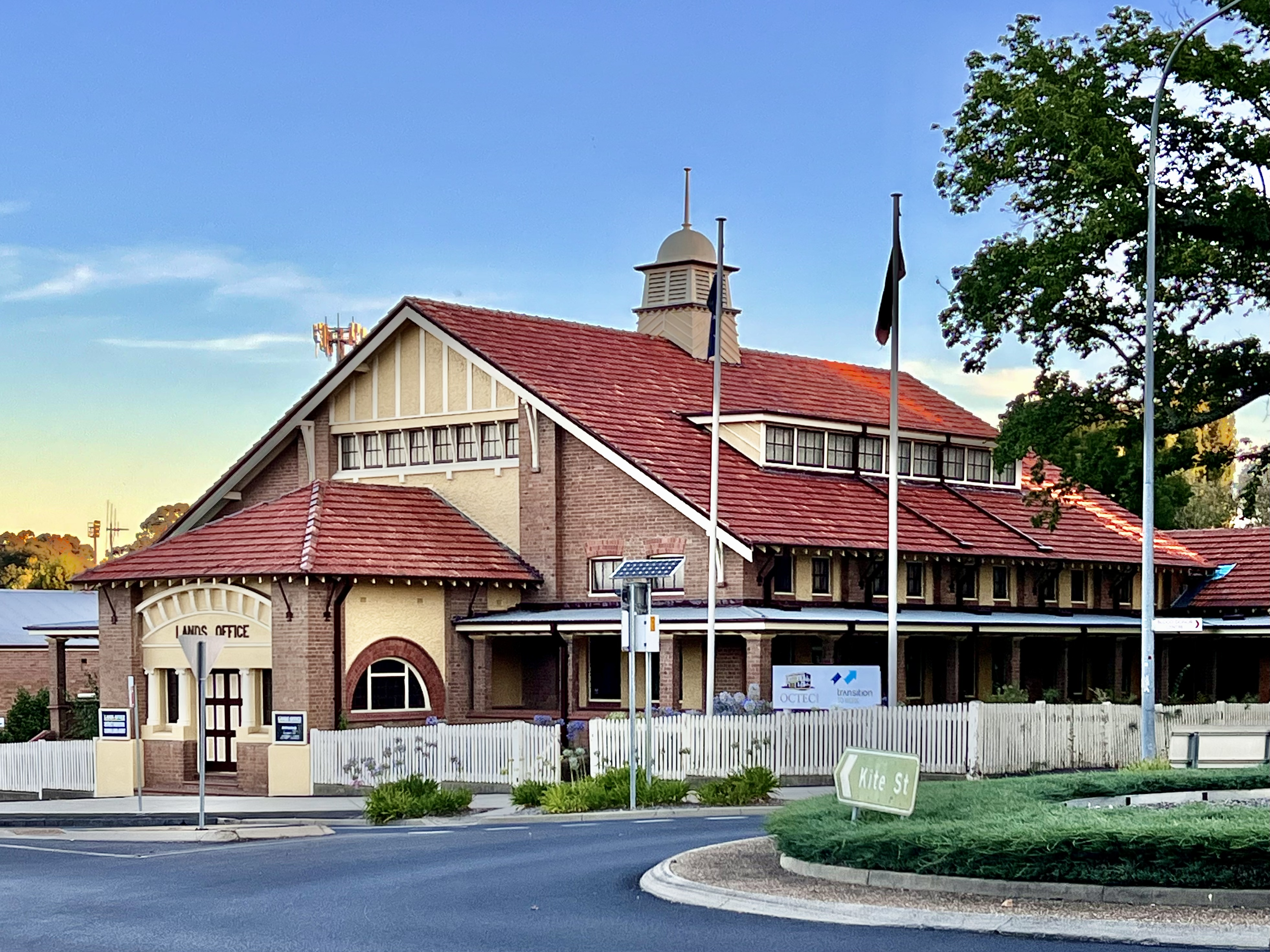
Former Department of Lands building

Orange is a well-known fruit growing district, and produces apples, pears, and many stone fruits such as cherries, peaches, apricots, and plums; oranges are not grown in the area, since its climate is too cool. In recent years, a large number of vineyards have been planted in the area for rapidly expanding wine production. The growth of this wine industry, coupled with the further development of Orange as a gourmet food capital, has ensured Orange's status as a prominent tourism destination.

Other large industries include:

- Cadia gold mine is a large open cut gold and copper mine located about 20 kilometres south of Orange. The mine has been developed throughout the 1990s and is a major employer in the region with an expected lifespan of several decades. Cadia is the second largest open-cut mine in Australia, following the Super Pit at Kalgoorlie, Western Australia. Large mineral deposits are also being uncovered from the more recently developed Ridgeway underground mine which is adjacent to the Cadia Mine.
- An Electrolux white goods factory, closed in 2017.

Orange is also the location of the headquarters of the New South Wales Department of Industry (Department of Industry, Skills and Regional Development, the New South Wales Department of Primary Industries).

== Education ==
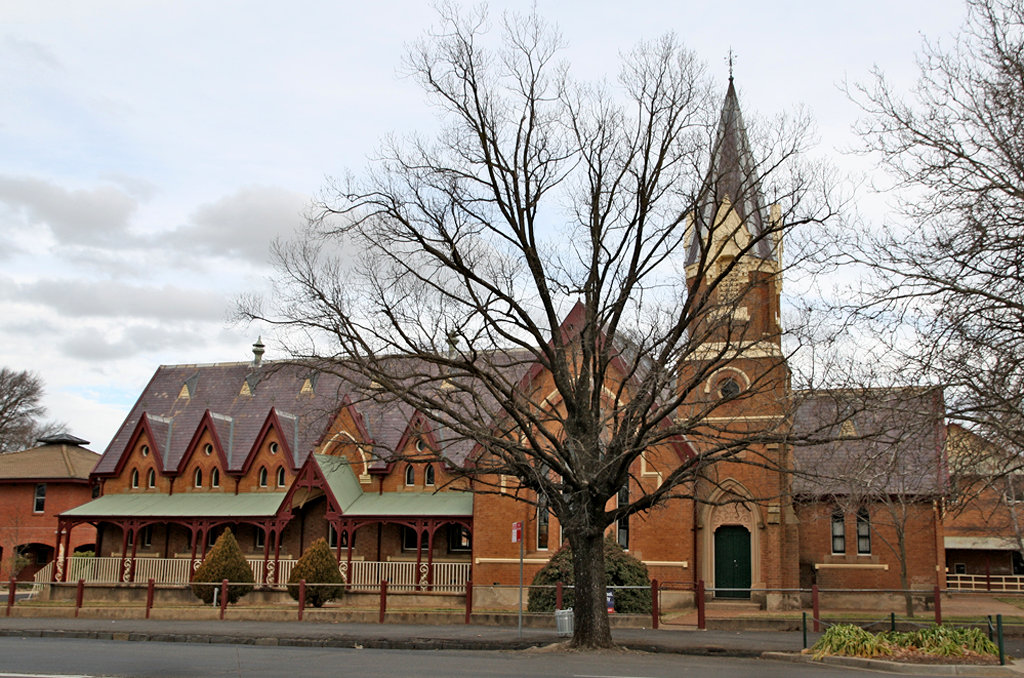
Orange Public School

=== Primary and public schools ===
- St Mary's Catholic Primary School
- Orange Public School, opened 1880
- Orange East Public School
- Calare Public School
- Orange Christian School
- Kinross Wolaroi School (Pre Prep-Senior School)
- Bletchington Primary School
- Anson Street Public School
- Glenroi Heights Public School
- Bowen Public School
- Canobolas Public School
- Clergate Public School
- Catherine McAuley Catholic
- Orange Anglican Grammar School

The following primary schools are not within the city limits of Orange but are located within the rural fringe of Orange:

- Spring Hill Public School
- Nashdale Primary School
- Spring Terrace Public School
- Borenore Public School
- Clergate Public School
- Mullion Creek Public School

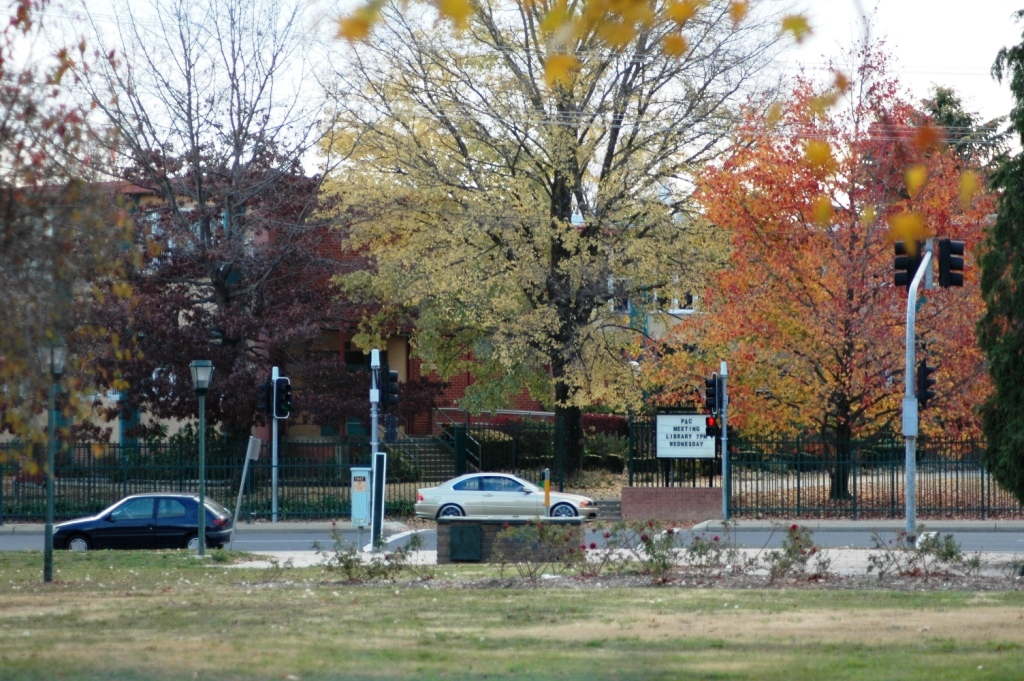
Orange High School

=== Secondary schools ===
- Orange High School
- James Sheahan Catholic High School
- Canobolas Rural Technology High School
- Orange Christian School (K–12)
- Kinross Wolaroi School (Pre Prep-Senior School)
- Orange Anglican Grammar School (K–12)
- MET School Orange Campus (3–12)
- De La Salle College (Closed in 1977)

=== Tertiary education ===
- A campus of Charles Sturt University is located on the outskirts of northern Orange.
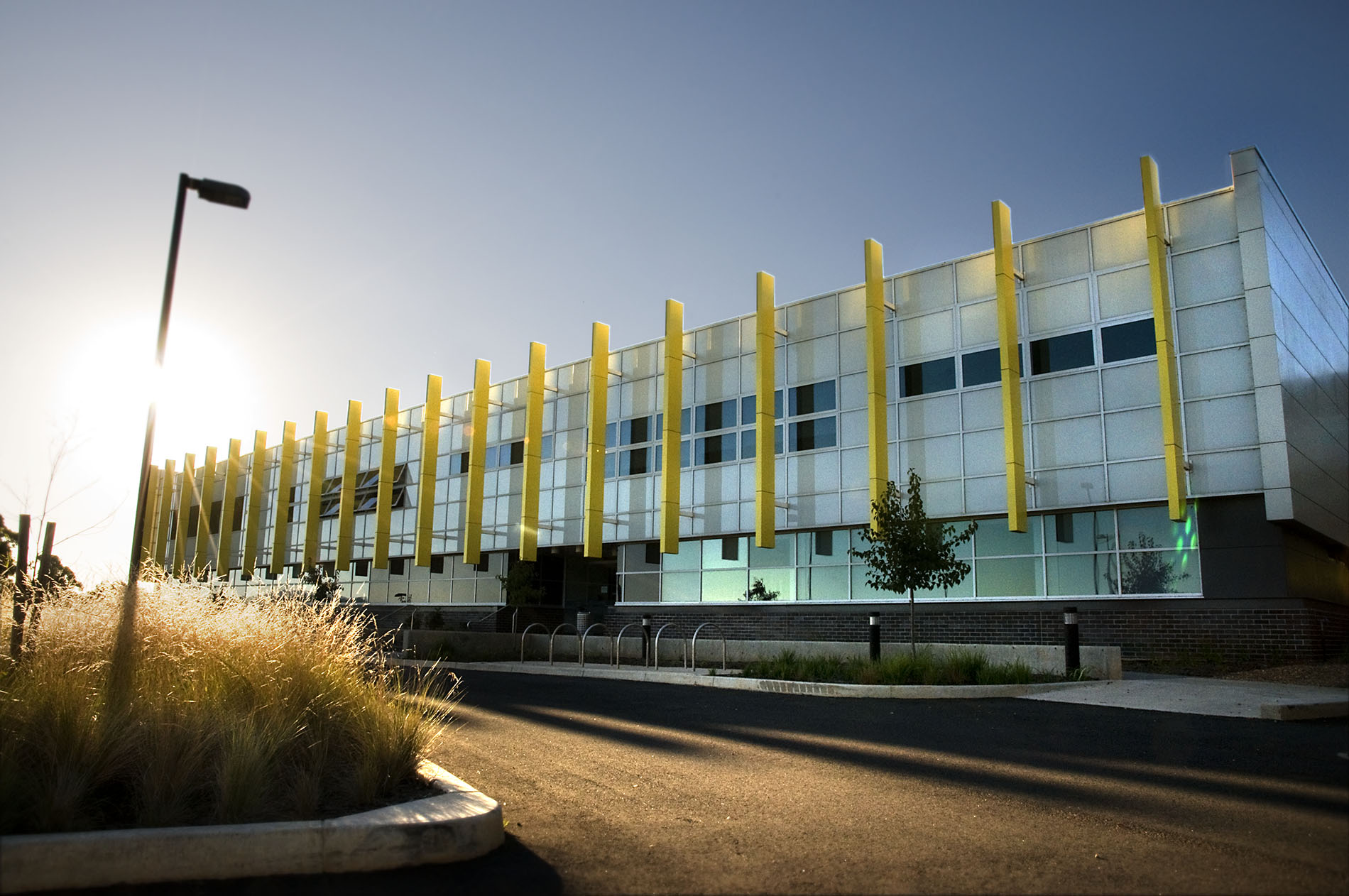
  Charles Sturt University's campus in Orange
- A large campus of TAFE is also located in Orange.

== Churches ==
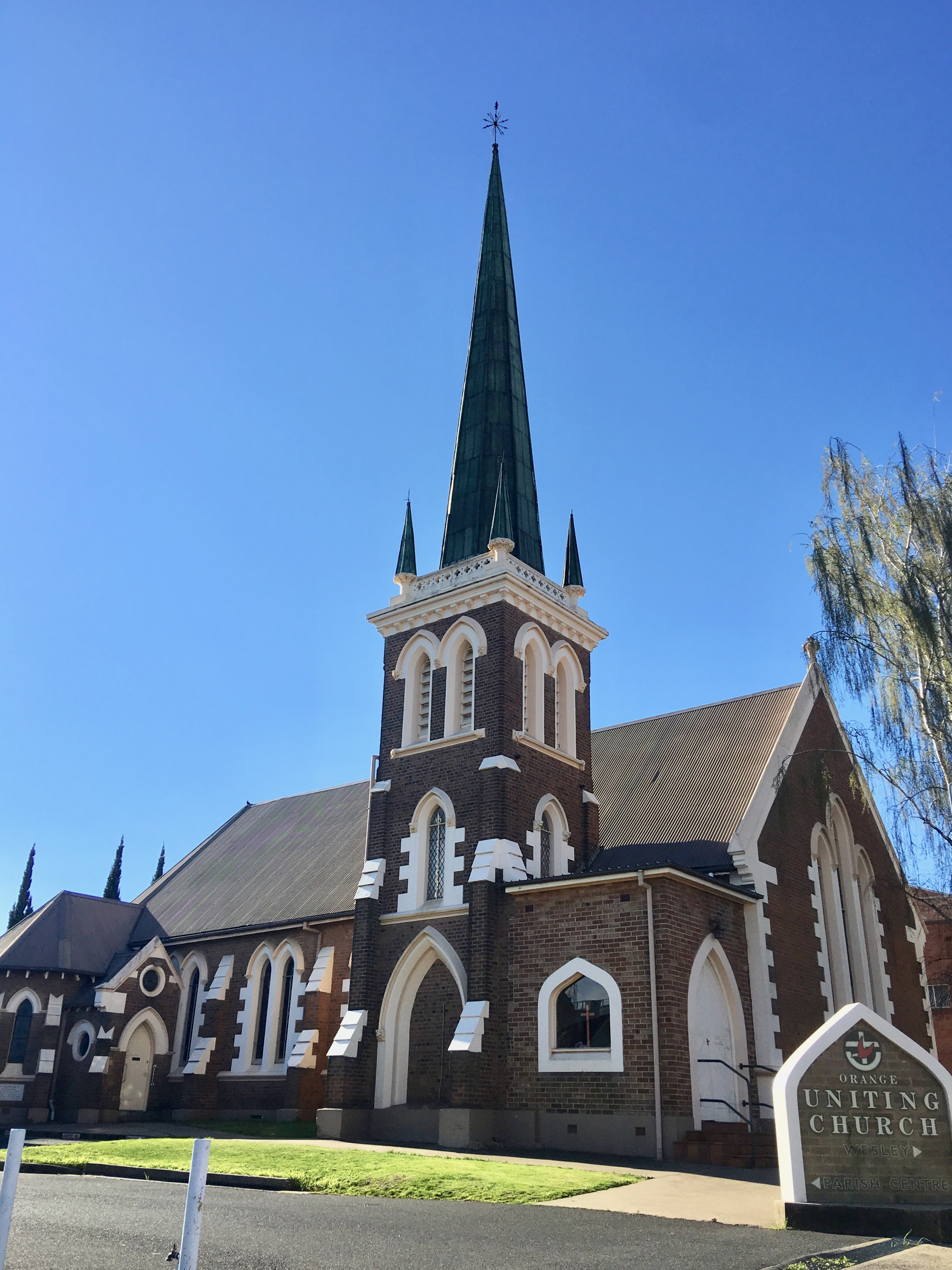
Orange Uniting Church

- St Joseph's and St Mary's Catholic Churches
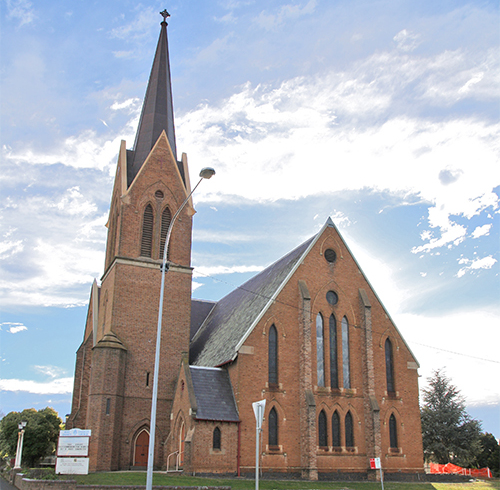
- Holy Trinity Church
  Holy Trinity Anglican Church
- St Barnabas Anglican Church
- Orange Uniting Churches
- Orange Baptist Church
- Orange Presbyterian Church
- St Peter's Lutheran Church
- New Life City Church
- Orange Evangelical Church
- Orange Christian Assembly
- Mountain Hope Church
- Salvation Army
- Orange Seventh-day Adventist Church
- Orange Church of Christ
- Slavic Pentecostal Church
- The Church of Jesus Christ of Latter-Day Saints
- Open Heavens Church

== Suburbs and Localities ==
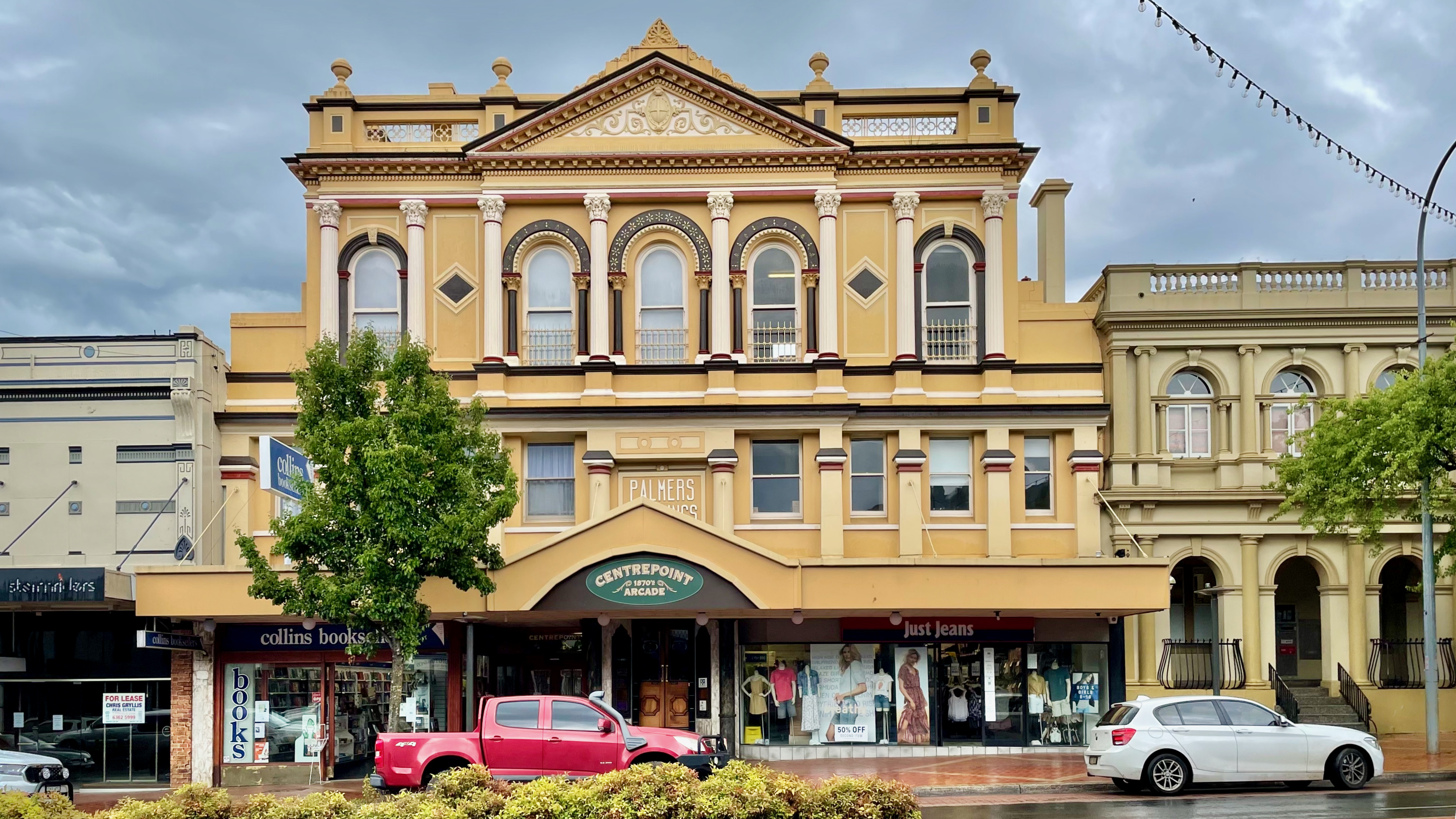
Centrepoint Arcade on Summer Street

The Royal Hotel

The following are listed as the suburbs within Orange City Council, according to the New South Wales Division of Local Government:

- Ammerdown: a residential locality to the north west of Orange on the Mitchell Highway.
- Bletchington: containing mostly residential areas with one school, it is one of the largest residential areas, and it is often split into North Orange and Bletchington. Within the suburb are the Orange Botanic Gardens, the Orange Adventure Playground, and the Waratah Sports Ground.
- Bloomfield: containing farmland, Bloomfield Golf Course, Riverside Mental Institution and Orange Health Service (a major regional hospital) along with the Gosling Creek Reservoir and the Gosling Creek nature reserve.
- Borenore: a locality, 15 km (9 mi) west of Orange, comprising primarily farmland. Also the site of the Australian National Field Days.
- Bowen: containing residential, predominantly public housing, industrial, commercial, Kinross Woloroi School, and government offices, this suburb also has the main road out of Orange to Sydney. It also contains the Orange Showground and the Orange Cemetery.
- Calare: the suburb is located to the west of the CBD. It is mostly a residential area, and contains Calare Public School and Orange High School, and Wentworth Golf Course. It is also commonly split into Calare, Bel-Air and Wentworth Estate and has The Quarry and Towac Park Racecourse. It houses most new areas of Orange
- Canobolas: this mainly farming and recreation area, contains the Mount Canobolas State recreation area and Mount Canobolas.
- Clifton Grove: containing farmland and large residential blocks, some parts of the estate are down stream from the Suma Park Reservoir and the area also contains the Kinross State Forest.
- Clover Hill: a residential suburb to the north of the CBD.
- Glenroi: a mainly residential area with areas of public housing, along with the (now defunct) Electrolux white goods manufacturing plant. It also contains industrial land in areas surrounding the factory, as well as a more recent industrial area known as Leewood Estate.
- Huntley: a locality south of Orange.
- Lucknow: a small village approximately 9 kilometres (5.6 mi) east of Orange. It is a historic mining town with small residential, small industrial and commercial with most being farmland.
- March: a locality north of Orange.
- Millthorpe: a village south east of Orange. The area constituting a suburb of Orange is constituted of farmland lying to the northwest of the village.
- Narrambla: a mainly industrial and farming land area.
- Nashdale:a community located approximately 8 kilometres west of Orange. The community gathers around the local Nashdale Public School and hall.
- Orange: the suburb comprises the central business district of the city, which contains an original grid street plan. The main street of Orange is Summer Street. The CBD can be defined as being the area of the city bounded by Hill, March, Peisley, and Moulder Streets.
- Orange East: beginning on the eastern side of the railway line, Orange East is mostly residential, but contains some light businesses, especially on Summer, Byng, and William Streets.
- Orange South: directly to the south of the CBD, beginning past Moulder Street this area contains Wade Park and the Orange Base Hospital.
- Shadforth: a locality to the east of Orange bypassed by the Mitchell Highway that contains Shadforth Quarry.
- Spring Hill: a village to the southeast of Orange.
- Spring Terrace: a locality and small village located south of Orange, centred on the local primary school.
- Springside: a rural locality to the south of Orange.
- Suma Park: a lightly populated residential area on the eastern outskirts of Orange. It contains Suma Park Reservoir, Orange's main water supply.
- Summer Hill: a lightly populated residential, industrial, and farmland area on the south eastern outskirts of Orange on the Mitchell Highway.
- Warrendine: a mostly residential area and contains James Sheahan Catholic High School and industrial land. It also has small school farmland and Jack Brabham Park.
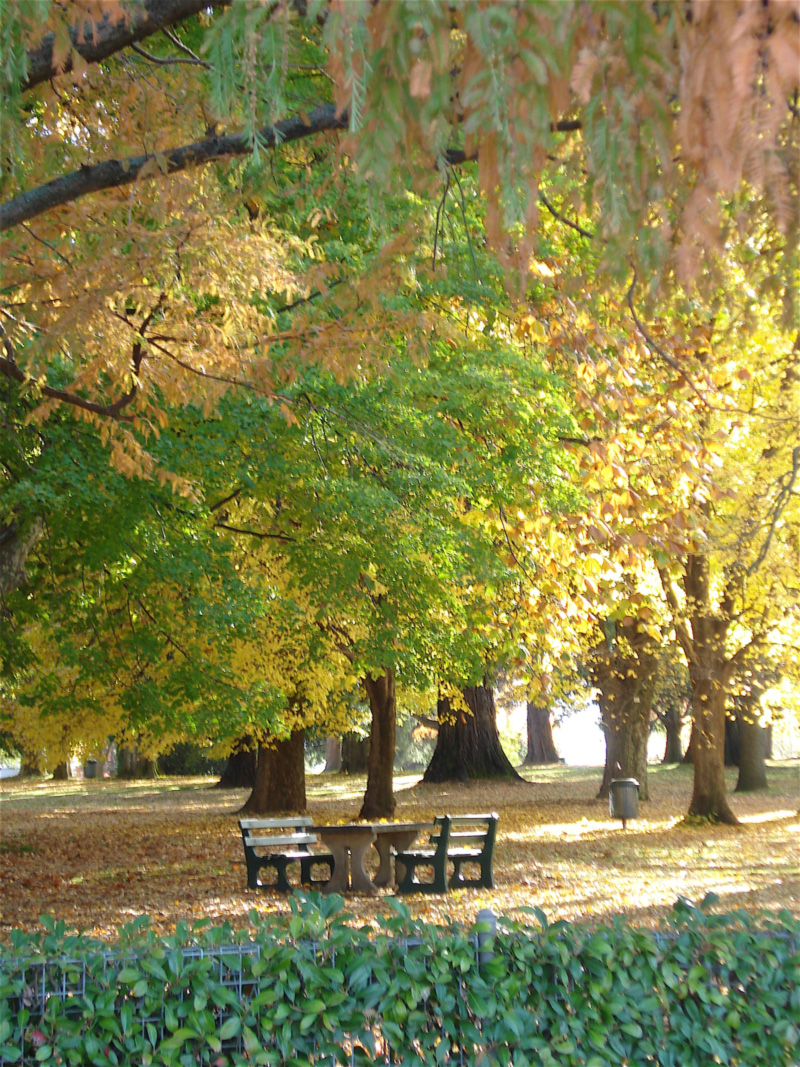
  Cook Park in Autumn

== Population ==
According to ABS data, there were 42,977 people in the city of Orange as of June 2024. When including surrounding towns and villages, the city supports a population of well over 100,000 through its industrial, commercial, and service resources. According to the 2021 Census:

- Aboriginal and Torres Strait Islander people made up 7.7% of the population.
- 89.3% of people were born in Australia. The next most common countries of birth were United Kingdom 846, India 502, New Zealand 414, Philippines 312 and Nepal 233.
- 87.1% of people only spoke English at home. Other languages spoken at home included Malayalam 0.7%, Nepali 0.6%, Mandarin 0.4%, and Tagalog 0.3%.
- The most common responses for religion were No Religion 32.6%, Catholic 26.3%, and Anglican 15.6%.
- Of the employed people in Orange, 20.8% worked in health. Other major industries of employment included education and training 9.6%, retail trade 9.6%, public administration 8.0%, and construction 8.0%

Historical population
Year	Pop.	±%
1921	7,398	—
1933	9,634	+30.2%
1947	13,780	+43.0%
1954	18,247	+32.4%
1961	18,977	+4.0%
1966	22,208	+17.0%
1971	24,185	+8.9%
1976	26,254	+8.6%
1981	27,626	+5.2%
1986	28,935	+4.7%
1991	29,635	+2.4%
1996	30,705	+3.6%
2001	31,923	+4.0%
2006	31,544	−1.2%
2011	34,992	+10.9%
2016	37,182	+6.3%
2021	40,127	+7.9%
Source: Australian Bureau of Statistics data.

== Mining ==
Cadia-Ridgeway Mine is a large open cut gold and copper mine located about 20 kilometres south of Orange, the mine has been developed throughout the 1990s employing several thousand employees with an expected lifespan of several decades. Cadia is the second largest open cut mine in Australia after the Super Pit at Kalgoorlie. Large mineral deposits are also being uncovered from the more recently developed Ridgeway underground mine which is adjacent to the Cadia Mine.

== Winemaking ==
The Orange wine region is defined as the area above 600m in the local government areas of Orange, Cabonne and Blayney and can be usefully described as a circle around Orange. The Orange region is good for grape growing and winemaking due to a combination of geology, soils, climate and temperature. Together these factors combine to produce grapes and wine of distinct flavours and colour. The climate perhaps plays the biggest part in giving Orange some distinct natural advantages – the cool temperatures during most of the growing season coupled with dry autumn conditions are ideal for grape growing.

=== Wineries ===
- Amour Wines
- Angullong Wines
- Atallah Wines
- Bloodwood
- Boree Lane
- Borrodell on the Mount
- Brangayne of Orange
- Canobolas Smith
- Cargo Road Winery
- Chalou Wines
- Cooks Lot
- Colmar Estate
- Cumulus Estate
- Dindima
- De Salis
- Faisan Estate
- Habitat Vineyard
- Heifer Station Vineyard
- Highland Heritage
- Hoosegg Wines
- Mayfield Vineyard
- Montoro Wines
- Mortimer's Wines
- Nashdale Lane
- Orange Mountain Wines
- Patina
- Philip Shaw
- Printhie / Swift
- Ross Hill
- Rowlee Wines
- Rikard Wines
- Sassy Wines
- Sea Saw Wines
- Slow Wine Co.
- Strawhouse Wines
- Stockman's Ridge
- Swinging Bridge
- Tallwood Wines
- Tamburlaine Wines
- Word of Mouth Wines

Wineries that use Orange region grapes in their wines include Brokenwood Wines (Hunter Valley based), Logan (Mudgee), Tamburlaine (Hunter Valley), Gartelmann (Hunter Valley), Windowrie (Central Ranges), Eloquesta Wines (Mudgee) and Lowe Wines (Mudgee). In 2007, South Australian based Penfolds winery released the 2007 Penfolds Bin 311 Orange Region Chardonnay.

== Media ==
Orange is served by several radio stations, including 105.1 Triple M Central West 2GZFM, 105.9 Hit Central West, FM107.5 Orange Community Radio, 103.5 Rhema FM, One Central West FM88 and 2EL 1089AM – a commercial station that gets most of its programming from 2SM in Sydney. The Australian Broadcasting Corporation (ABC) also broadcasts from four radio stations in Orange including ABC Central West (2CR) on 549AM and three national networks – ABC Classic on 102.7 FM, ABC Radio National on 104.3 FM, and Triple J on 101.9 FM.

The city receives five network television stations – Seven (owned and operated station by Seven Network), WIN TV (a Nine Network affiliate), Network 10 (owned and operated station by Network 10), ABC TV and SBS TV.

- Seven News produces a half-hour local news bulletin for the Central West, airing each weeknight at 6pm. It is produced from local newsrooms in Orange and Dubbo and broadcast from studios in Canberra.
- WIN Television produces a half-hour local news bulletin for the Central West, airing each weeknight at 5:30pm. It is produced from its local newsroom in Orange and broadcast from studios in Wollongong.
- Network 10 produces short news updates of 10 News throughout the day from its Hobart studios.

Subscription television service Foxtel is available in Orange and the surrounding region via satellite.

The local newspapers are the Central Western Daily, The Orange App (online daily news), the Midstate Observer and Orange City Life.

== Attractions ==
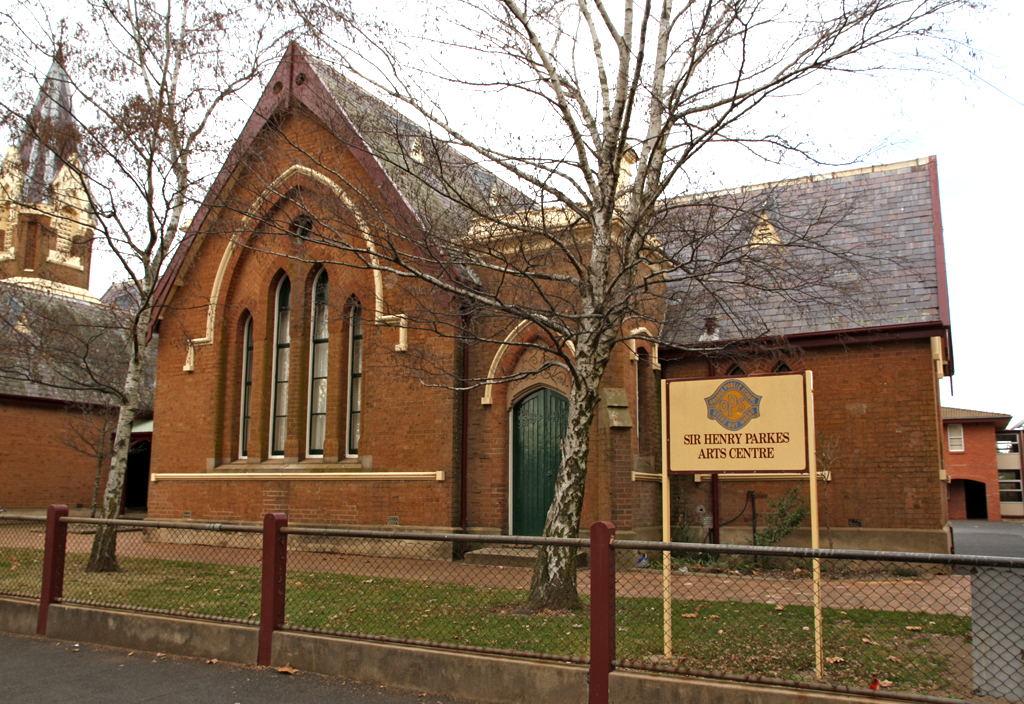
Sir Henry Parkes Arts Centre

Orange has many attractions. There are bush walking trails in Orange including; Spring Glade Walking Track, Cook Park Heritage Walk, Summits Walking Tracks, Nangar National Park and Mullion Range State Conservation Area. Borenore Caves is a series of limestone caves. Duntryleague Golf Club and Clubhouse, Mount Canobolas and Federal Falls in the Mount Canobolas State Conservation Area, Lake Canobolas, Gnoo Blas Motor Racing Circuit, the historic centre of Orange and the Orange Botanic Gardens are also near the town. Elephant Park, near Moulder Park, got its name from when circuses visited the town, and the elephants seen there.

== Transport ==
=== Roads ===
Orange is situated on the Mitchell Highway, linking the city to Molong, Wellington, Dubbo and Bourke to the north west, and to Bathurst to the east and from there to Sydney via the Great Western Highway (260 km or 160 mi). Due west are Parkes (100 km or 62 mi) and Forbes (125 km or 78 mi), which is midway along the Newell Highway, running from Brisbane, Queensland to Melbourne, Victoria. In 2007 a bypass road, known as the northern distributor road, was opened for use after decades of planning.

=== Public transport ===
Orange Buslines operate a number of routes within the city and a service to the neighbouring city of Bathurst. Newman's Bus Service operates route 516 on weekdays to Blayney. Australia Wide Coaches operate a daily coach service to Sydney.

NSW TrainLink operate several coach services with connecting train services from Lithgow to Sydney, as well as a less frequent coach service to Cootamundra for connection to Melbourne.

=== Air ===
Orange is also serviced by a regional-class airport, Orange Airport, located approximately 15 km to the south of the city, in an area known as Huntley.

=== Railways ===
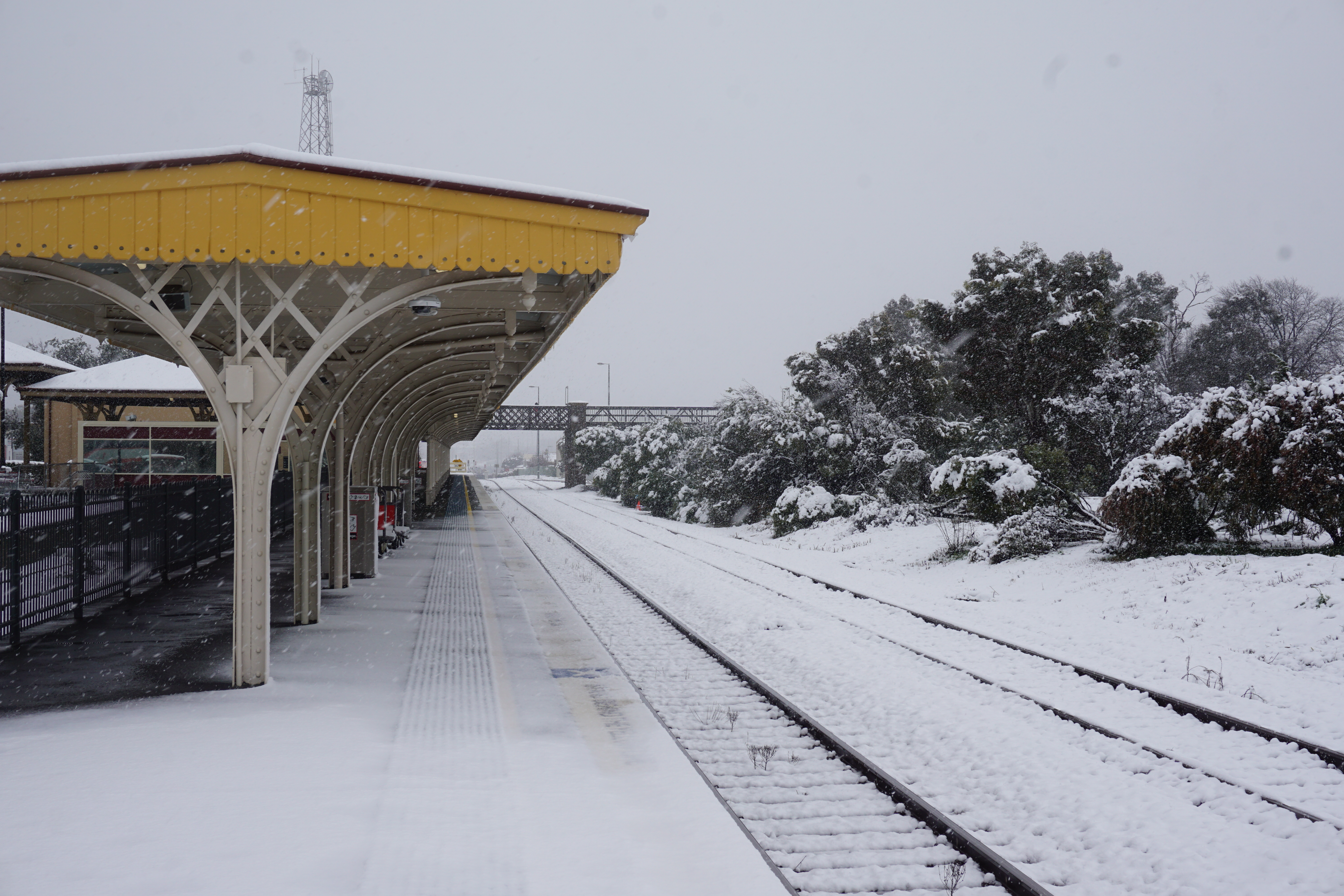
Orange railway station

Orange has two railway stations. The main station, on the Main Western Line to Bourke, was opened in 1877 and is served by the daily NSW TrainLink Central West XPT service between Sydney and Dubbo and the weekly Outback Xplorer service between Sydney and Broken Hill. A smaller station, opened in 1970, known as Orange East Fork, lies on the branch line to Broken Hill was served by the weekly Indian Pacific service to Perth but due to low passenger numbers using this station (16 for the entire year 2017) this "bare bones" station is no longer used and the Indian-Pacific no longer stopping between Mount Victoria and Broken Hill.

== Notable residents ==
=== Architecture ===
- John Andrews AO, internationally acclaimed architect resided in the city
- John Blackwood, 11th Baron Dufferin and Claneboye, is an architect who for most of his career practised in Orange.

=== Business ===
- James Dalton (1834–1919), an early Australian merchant, pastoralist, and Roman Catholic lay leader, a key figure in the early development of Orange and district

=== Film and television ===
- Billy Bevan (1887–1957), actor, born William Bevan Harris in Orange.
- Mark Furze, a television actor and singer, born in Orange in 1986.
- Elizabeth Lackey, an actress and model, attended Orange High School in the 1980s.

=== Food and hospitality ===
- Kate Bracks, winner of the third series of MasterChef Australia, from Orange

=== Journalism ===
- Kate McClymont, investigative journalist, grew up near Orange.

=== Medicine ===
- Janet Carr, physiotherapist and academic, raised in Orange
- Ida Dorothy Love, military nurse, midwife and midwifery educator, was born in Orange
- Anna Windsor (born 1976), Multi Olympian and Commonwealth Games swimmer. Medical Doctor based in Orange.

=== Music and creative arts ===
- Murray Cook, a vocalist, songwriter and guitarist; best known as one of the members of The Wiggles, grew up in Orange
- Susan, Crown Princess of Albania (1941–2004), the wife of Leka, Crown Prince of Albania, educated and taught art at Presbyterian Ladies' College, Orange
- Shannon Noll, a singer; best known for the song ‘What About Me?’, was born in Orange.
- Chris Qua, of Daly-Wilson Big Band and Galapagos Duck, jazz musician was born in Orange.

=== Poetry ===
- Banjo Paterson (1864–1941), poet, born near Orange
- Kenneth Slessor (1901–1971), poet, born in Orange

=== Police ===
- Frederick Hanson (1914–1980), former Commissioner of New South Wales Police, born in Orange

=== Politics ===
- Sir Charles Cutler (1918–2006), a former politician including holding office for 28 years as an elected Member for Orange, and former Deputy Premier
- J. J. Dalton (1861–1924), the second son of James Dalton, the first Australian-born member of the British Parliament, born in Orange
- Tim Gartrell, former National Secretary of the Australian Labor Party and now Chief Executive of GenerationOne, born in Orange in 1970
- Sir Neville Howse, VC (1863–1930), the first Australian recipient of the Victoria Cross, a physician living in Orange, twice elected Mayor, and later federal politician

=== Sports ===
- Robbie Abel, rugby union footballer, born in Orange in 1989
- Jason Belmonte, tenpin bowler, born in Orange in 1983
- Steve Bernard, born in Orange in 1949. Cricketer. Fast bowler for NSW, team selector for NSW and Australia, Australian team manager 1997–2011, international referee.
- Jack Besgrove, Australian softballer, born in Orange in 2003
- Edwina Bone, hockey player for Australia, was born in Orange
- George Bonnor, test cricketer, born in Bathurst in 1855, died and buried in Orange in 1912. He lived at 'Strathroy', Spring Street, which his family owned.
- Darren Britt, former rugby league footballer, born in Orange in 1969
- Adam Clune, rugby league player, born in Orange in 1995
- Andrew Dawes, Australian Paralympic coach, born in Orange in 1969
- Tino Fa'asuamaleaui, rugby league player, born in Orange in 2000
- Jo Garey, Australian cricketer 1995, lives in Orange.
- Bob Lindfield, rugby league player, born in Orange in 1901
- David Lyons, rugby union player, born in Orange in 1980
- Phoebe Litchfield, Australian cricketer, lives in Orange.
- James Maloney, rugby league player, born in Orange in 1986
- Ted McFadden born in Orange in 1880 played in the inaugural Balmain Tigers Rugby League Team (1908–1910)
- Daniel Mortimer, rugby league player, born in Orange in 1989
- Peter Mortimer, father of Daniel Mortimer, a former professional rugby league footballer and manager, now news reporter and winery owner, living in the Orange region
- Lucas Parsons, golfer, born in Orange in 1969
- John Sumegi, flat water canoeist, born in Orange in 1954. Trained on Lake Canobolas, competed at 1976 Olympics, won silver medal at 1980 Olympics.
- Max Stewart, racing driver, born in Orange in 1935
- Jack Wighton, rugby league player, born in Orange in 1993
- Tameka Yallop, soccer player for Australia, born in Orange in 1991

== Heritage listings ==
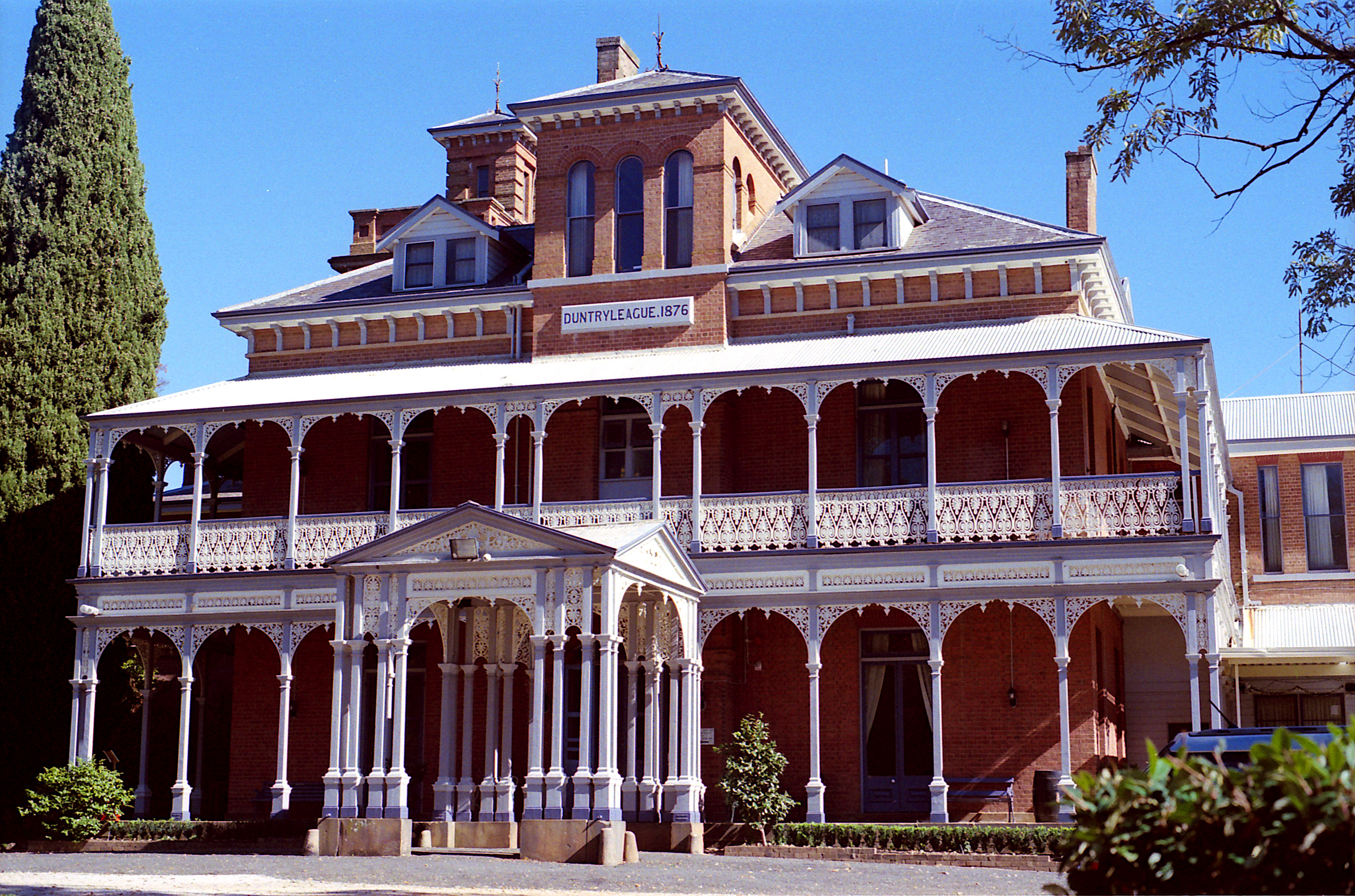
Duntryleague; a heritage listed manor

Orange has a number of heritage-listed sites, including:

- 215–223 Anson Street: Uniting Church and Kindergarten Hall, Orange
- 3–25 Bathurst Road: Bowen Terrace
- 84 Byng Street: Union Bank of Australia building, Orange
- Forest Road: Bloomfield Hospital, Orange
- Peisley Street: Orange railway station, New South Wales
- 24–26 Summer Street: Cook Park, Orange
- 29 Summer Street: Berrilea
- 222 Summer Street: Orange Post Office
- Woodward Street: Duntryleague

== Water resources ==
Orange has several water sources used for domestic consumption, both currently in use and formerly used. Currently Suma Park Dam and Spring Creek Reservoir are used for domestic water consumption. Two other dams, Lake Canobolas and Gosling Creek Reservoir, were previously used for domestic water consumption; however, they are now used for recreational purposes. The city is currently on Level 2 water restrictions, following good rain (Sept 2020).

The local mine, Cadia-Ridgeway Mine, uses the city's treated effluent to supplement its water supply.

In 2018, a 39km pipeline between the Macquarie River and the Suma Park Dam at Orange became operational. The cost was $47m. Stormwater harvesting has been found to have a lower operating cost to the pipeline.

== Stormwater harvesting - a first for Australia ==
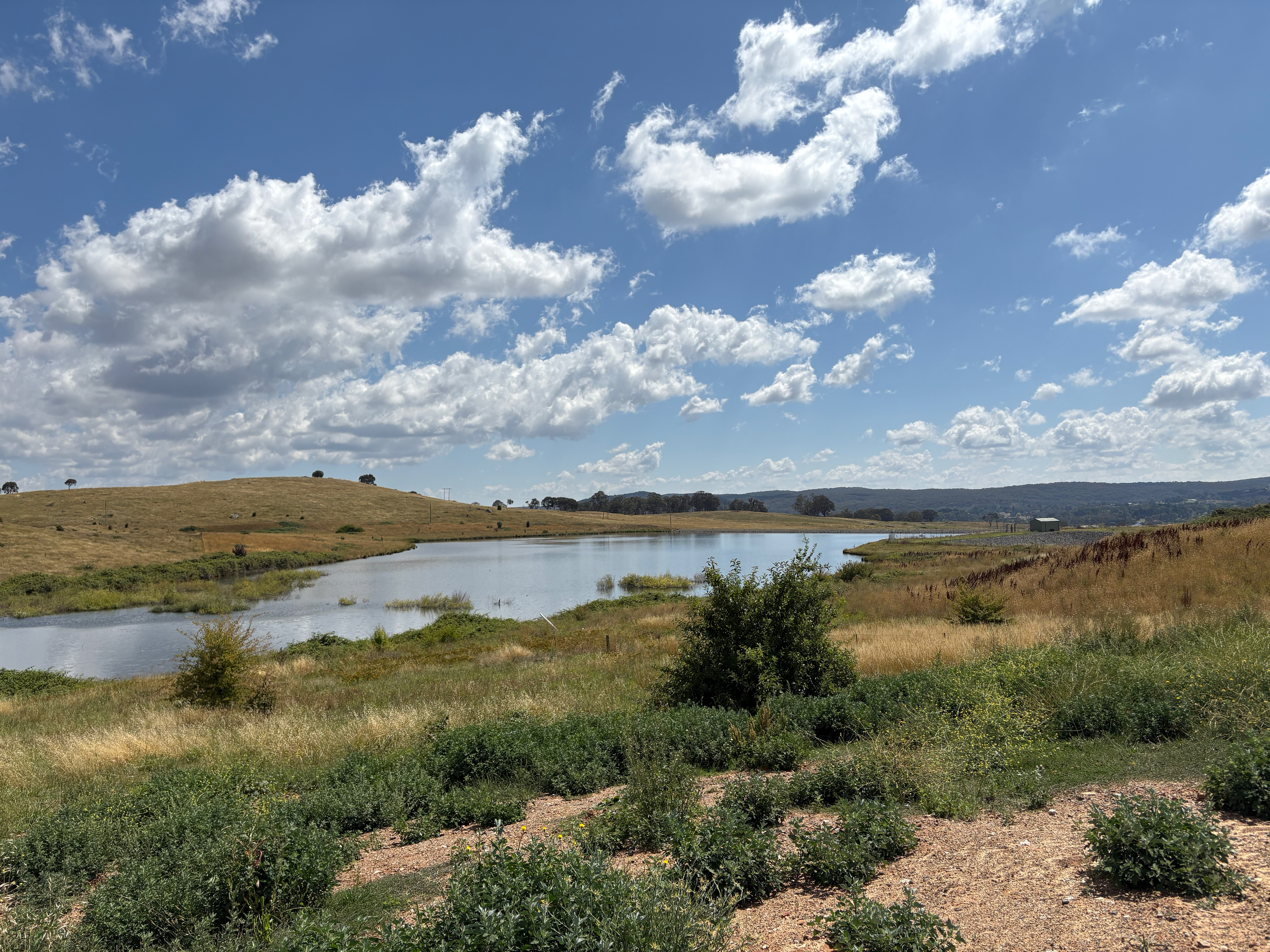
The holding dam for stormwater collected from Blackmans Creek. From here the water is processed before being pumped into Suma Park Dam. Water from this dam is then sent to the Icely Road Water Treatment Plant and into the potable water network.

The Millennium Drought caused a severe reduction in the supply of potable water in Orange. Storages fell to 23%. In response, the use of water was reduced by the introduction of prices and restrictions. To increase supply it was decided to harvest and treat stormwater. The system was the first of its kind in Australia. The initial project has secured 900 ML of water each year, enough to supply one fifth of the towns needs.

The second stage of the project will secure an additional 600 ML by developing stormwater retaining wetlands further upstream in the Blackmans Creek catchment.

== Sister cities ==
Orange is a sister city to:

- Orange, United States (1963)
- Ushiku, Japan (1990)
- Mount Hagen, Papua New Guinea (1985)
- Timaru, New Zealand (1986)

== See also ==
- List of cities in Australia
