= Bloomfield Hospital =

Bloomfield Hospital may refer to:

- Bloomfield Health Campus, a campus of the Orange Health Service in Orange, New South Wales, Australia, formerly known as Bloomfield Hospital.
- Bloomfield Hospital (Ireland), a mental health hospital in Dublin, Ireland.
