= St. John's Orphanage =

Decommissioned orphanage in New South Wales, Australia

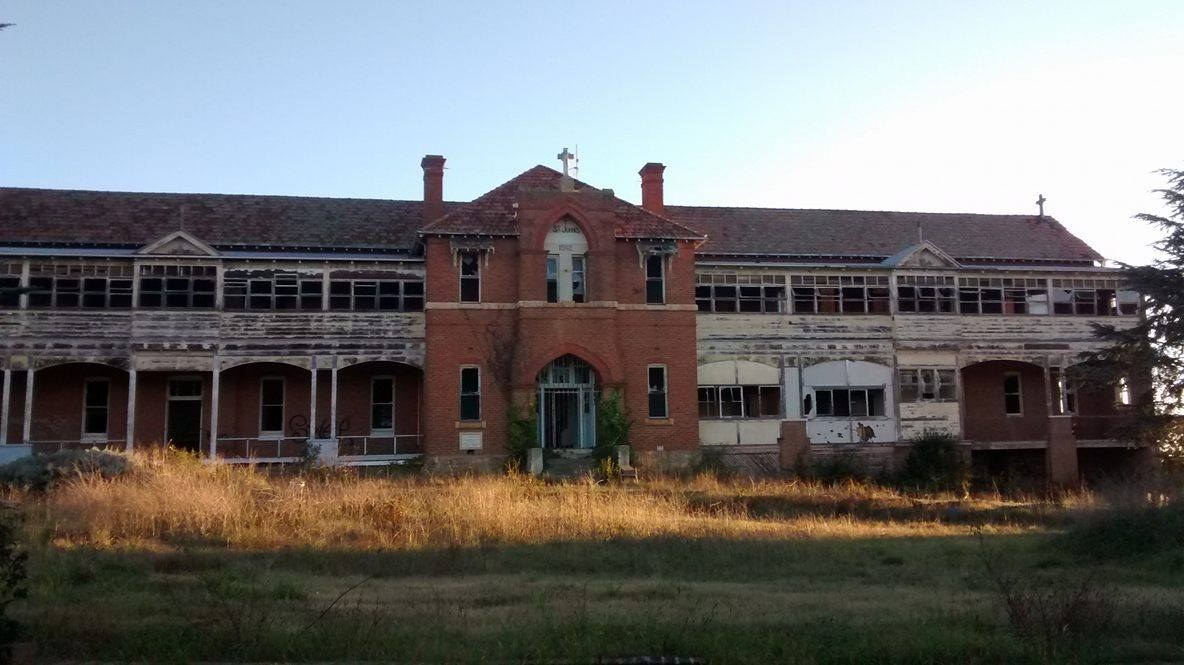
- St. John's Orphanage in 2015

- Location within New South Wales
- Alternative names: Goulburn Boys Orphanage

General information
- Status: Demolished
- Type: Orphanage
- Architectural style: Federation
- Location: 52–56 Mundy Street, Goulburn, New South Wales, Australia
- Coordinates: 34°45′42″S 149°42′37″E
- Opened: 1913 (Note: The foundation stone was laid and blessed in 1912.)
- Closed: 1978
- Client: Roman Catholic Diocese of Goulburn

Technical details
- Floor count: 2
- Grounds: 2.4 hectares (5.9 acres)

Design and construction
- Architect: E. C. Manfred
- Main contractor: King and Armstrong

St. John's Orphanage, sometimes referred to as the Goulburn Boys Orphanage, was an orphanage located on Mundy Street in Goulburn, a town located in New South Wales, Australia. The architect of the building was EC Manfred. The foundation stone was laid and blessed on 17 March 1912 by Bishop John Gallagher of Goulburn, who also blessed the building during its opening ceremony in late 1913. It was two storeys high, and several extensions were added to the building throughout its early history. The orphanage amalgamated with St. Joseph's Orphanage for girls in 1976, and the remaining orphans were placed into group homes. As a result, the orphanage was closed in 1978 and rented out to the Youth with a Mission Base until they left in 1994. Since then, the orphanage remained abandoned, until its demolition in 2023.

Run by the Sisters of Mercy and the Catholic Church until its closure, the orphanage housed males from the ages of 5 to 16 initially. Its capacity was intended to be 100 children, but this peaked to more than 200 during the Second World War. By the 1970s, the orphanage began taking in female orphans from St. Joseph's because of declining numbers of males. Until its closure, the orphanage took in more than 2,500 individuals for various reasons. Only four per cent of those who stayed there were actually orphans. The orphanage's residents were given a religious education, and were trained in agriculture. Accounts by former residents state that they suffered severe beatings and punishments, and that they were issued a single set of clothing that was rarely washed. Another claims that some residents endured sexual abuse and rape, not only by the staff, but by older boys, and the caretaker. However, others state that the nuns were tough but fair and remained in contact with them.

The orphanage site has been redeveloped as a mixed use development by businessman John Ferrara. The building was heavily vandalised, and a series of fires have destroyed much of its infrastructure. Ghost tours have been conducted in the building. It was heritage listed by the Goulburn Mulwaree Council.

== Location ==
St. John's Orphanage was located in the southern suburbs of Goulburn, a town in New South Wales. According to the Goulburn Evening Penny Post, the orphanage looks over one of the finest views of the town. The main front part of the building faces north, and the entrance gates are located on Mundy Street. The southern side of the lot connects off Combermere Street. The total size of the lot is 24,000 square metres (2.4 hectares or 5.9 acres).

== Architecture ==
=== Exterior, interior and surroundings ===
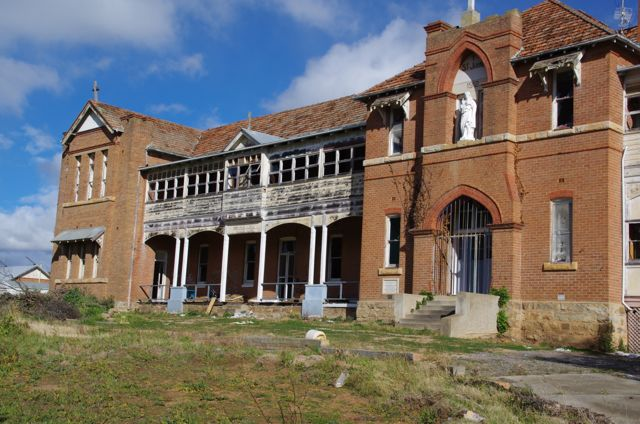
Main entry and southwestern wing of the building

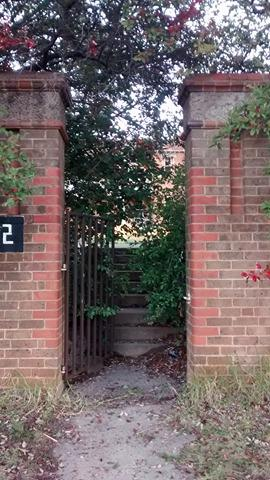
Gate entrance of St. John's Orphanage

The building was two storeys high and includes an attic and basement. All walls are made of brick, some of which are hollow (mainly the external ones). The roof tiles were red, and the balconies have iron railings. The exterior design was plain struck brickwork, reassured by red bricks and cut stone. The entrance block was located on the westerly end of the front. Because of a sudden fall in the land, the pavement is several feet above the natural surface which necessitated a flight of stone steps towards the entrance. The main doors to the building had two windows alongside them and form a porch. The easterly end of the building had a balcony and a verandah, which were both 3.04 metres (10.0 ft). Away from the building, a milking shed existed. In addition, 3 hectares (7.4 acres) of land was purchased, which contained an ample field suitable enough for all types of gardening.

=== Interior ===
The entrance hall was 2.45 metres (8.0 ft) with a tiled floor. The reception room was located on the right-hand side of the entrance hall. A moulded archway led to the staircase hall, with the stairs being at right angles to the entrance doors. Rooms formerly accessed from this hallway include the cellar, a sitting room which is 3.65 by 3.04 metres (12.0 by 10.0 ft) in size, a children's study room that is 6 metres (20 ft) by 6 metres and a children's refectory that was 9.1 metres (30 ft) by 6 metres. A back door led to verandahs that were found at the back of the building that allowed access to various other rooms. A second staircase, surrounded by brick walls, acted as an escape route in case of a fire. The staircase floor was the colour of cement and is made out of hardwood with iron risers. The staircase also provided access to the chapel room, which was 6.7 metres (22 ft) by 6 metres.

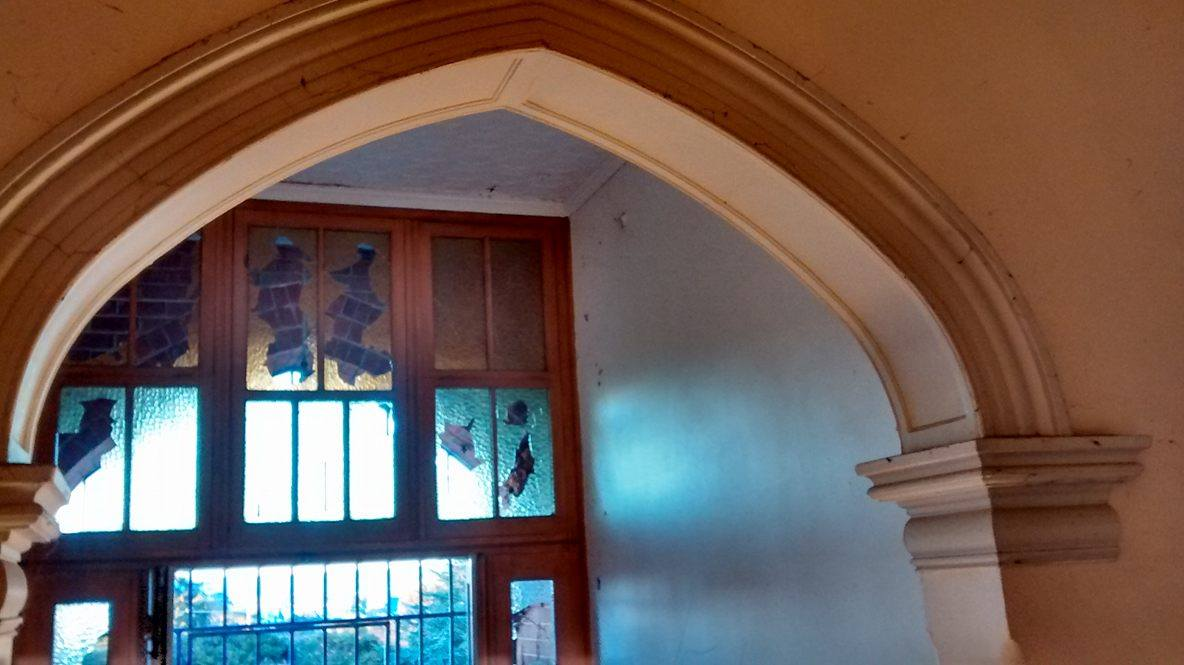
Entrance archway

Other rooms on the ground floor include a clothes room, a 6 by 5.5-metre (18 ft) community room, a 6 by 4.2-metre (14 ft) kitchen, a 2.13-metre (7.0 ft) by 2.1-metre pantry and a 7.6-metre (25 ft) by 3.65-metre lavatory. Bathrooms and shower bathrooms were fitted with hot and cold showers that are controlled from the lavatory. The laundry is 6.4 by 3.3 metres (21.0 by 10.8 ft) with copper and tubs; the laundry also had a heater that supplied the whole building with hot water. The block which contained the sanitary requirements for the building was connected by a covered way and is well ventilated by air shafts, latticed doors, and louvres. Underground, a brick, cemented tank was built to collect and store rainwater.

The second floor of the building contained a number of dormitories: a large, 18.2-metre (60 ft) by 6-metre dormitory existed with a 3-metre-wide (9.8 ft) balcony on one side and a 1.83-metre (6.0 ft) wide balcony on the other. A smaller, 9.1-metre by 6-metre dormitory was also present, as well as a 6-metre by 4.2-metre isolating room. Four bedrooms were designated for the Sisters of Mercy who were in charge of the building; these rooms were 3.65 metres by 3.04 metres and 3.96 metres (13.0 ft) by 2.74 metres (9.0 ft) respectively. The Sisters also had their own private bathroom. Almost every room in the building had a fireplace, surrounded by either bricks or a marble mantel and cement shelf. The ceilings on both floors were 3.96 metres high, and the whole building was fitted with electric lighting. The ceiling on the second floor was made out of plaster, whereas the ceiling on the first floor was made out of stamped steel.

== History ==
=== Background and planning ===
In 1905, an orphanage located nearby Kenmore Asylum was proposed at a general meeting of parishioners to replace an older orphanage that had been operating for more than 25 years on Clinton Street. The orphanage, which had catered to girls only, cared for approximately 50 girls per year, and the 0.2-hectare (0.49-acre) of land on which it was situated proved insufficient for the orphans. Thus, 24.28-hectare (60.0-acre) of land was purchased in nearby Kenmore for the proposed orphanage. Shortly after, the foundation stone was laid and blessed on the site. EC Manfred was the building's architect, and the contractors were Messrs. King and Armstrong. It was described as "severely simple Gothic" and cost £6,000 to build. (Note: More than £2,000 was promised for the building.) All of the girls from the old orphanage were removed, and boys aged eight and older were moved there and waited for a permanent home. An effort was made for people from Albury, Cootamundra, Wagga Wagga, Young and other places to take charge of the orphanage, but this was unsuccessful. Instead, the orphanage was established in Goulburn.

=== Opening ceremony ===
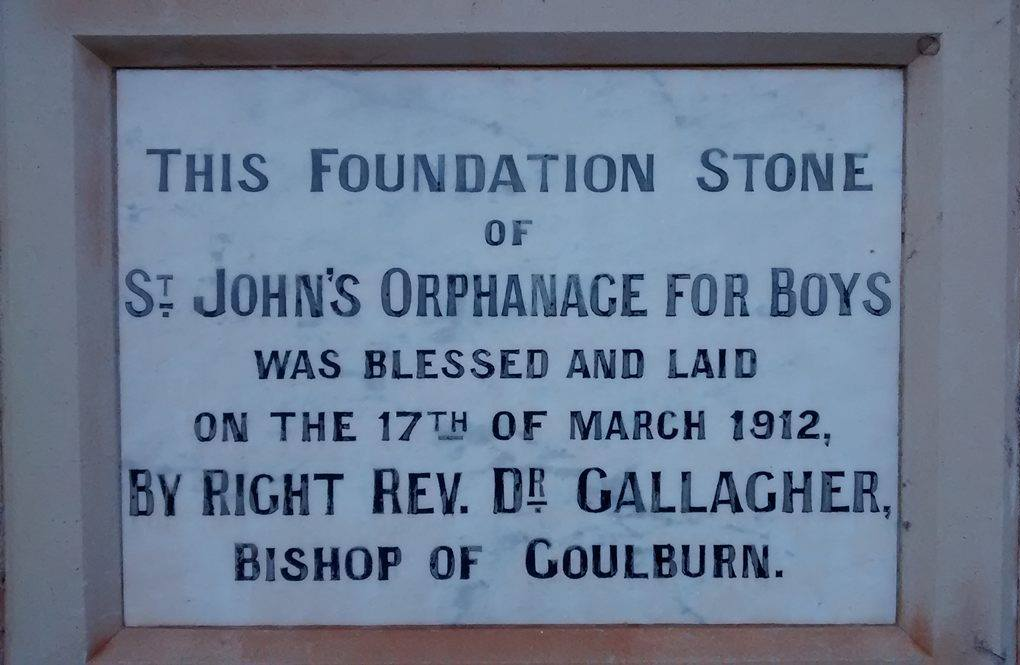
Foundation stone of the St. John's Orphanage

On 17 March 1912, the foundation stone of the orphanage was laid and blessed by Bishop Gallagher of Goulburn. However, the orphanage was not opened officially until December 1913, when the opening ceremony was held on a Sunday afternoon, and the building was opened and blessed by Bishop Gallagher. The ceremony attracted a large audience, many of whom were not members of the Catholic Church. By 3:30 p.m., the Australian Light Horse Band began marching towards the orphanage from a cathedral on Verner Street. The priests and the bishop brought up the rear walking behind several Catholic acolytes. While many attendees remained at the orphanage, hundreds walked along with the procession. Children who had marched with the procession were divided and formed a guard of honour. The bishop, who was accompanied by Father Cahill, entered the building and blessed it; a crucifix was subsequently placed in the main dormitory of the building. After the blessing, the bishop addressed the attending crowd from the front verandah, and discussed the use of the building. In addition, the Bishop went on to say that Pagan civilisations consign orphans to death or slavery:

The scarcely less cruel civilisation of our age, too, often handed them over to the State, and through the State to secular education, without consolations of religion, or hopes of blessed immortality. But within the bosom of the Catholic Church, God, who tempered the wind to the shorn lamb, took compassion on the outcast and the orphan of the Catholic faith. Catholic generosity, aided by a spirit of philanthropy, charity, genuine and Christian altruism, which still happily reigned throughout the Australian Commonwealth, would not permit orphans to perish of hunger, thirst, or nakedness, even though the Governments refused to assist them because they went to confession or formed upon their breasts the Sign of the Cross, or offered prayer to God.

— Bishop Gallagher of Goulburn.

=== Later history and closure ===
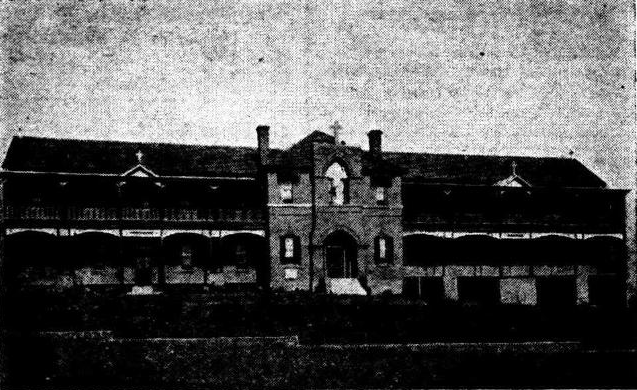
The orphanage in its early years, 1919

The orphanage was run by the Sisters of Mercy and the Catholic Church until its closure in 1978. Shortly after opening, the orphanage experienced an increased demand for admission leading to the construction of a west wing and chapel in 1919. However, it remained unfurnished for some time due to lack of funding, and the Sisters of Mercy subsequently refused admission. A new wing for the building was constructed in 1924 dedicated to the memory of Bishop Gallagher. The new wing was opened and blessed by Reverend J. Barry; additional classrooms and dormitories were built, being 18.2 m (60 ft) by 7.6 m (25 ft) in size, followed by furnishing, painting and connection of sewer lines. The total cost was approximately £2,676. In 1932, a milking shed and hall were built, and in 1938 new additions to the orphanage were added, costing £2,575. This included a modification and extension to the south wing. The orphanage endured minor damage in 1943 when a fire broke out just after midnight and destroyed quantities of firewood and two panels of fencing.

Throughout its 66 years of operating, the orphanage took in approximately 2,500 individuals. Approximately four per cent of all boys who stayed there were orphans, whereas the remainder had living parents; most of them either came from poor or troubled families who were unable to afford to look after them. The orphanage also took in child migrants. Only boys from the ages of 5 to 16 were taken care there. However, the Sisters of Mercy sometimes took in families in need or individuals who were 3 years old or younger. One of the Sisters of Mercy's aims was to keep brothers together if possible, and if they had sisters, they would be housed at the St. Joseph's Orphanage. Although the building could only house up to 100 boys, the capacity rose to between 140 and 250 boys during the Second World War, far above the suitable capacity of the building.

In 1975, the orphanage began taking in girls from the St. Joseph's Orphanage due to declining numbers of boys, and, in 1976, amalgamated with the orphanage; this formed the St. John's Home, which would close in 1987. After 66 years in operation, the building closed in 1978. The remaining orphans were put into group homes. The Sisters of Mercy continued to care for these orphans until those homes closed in 1981. From 1979 to 1994, the building was leased to the Youth with a Mission Base, where people travelled from overseas to pursue discipleship training courses. The building has since been abandoned and left to deteriorate. In 2007, a proposal was made by former orphanage resident Jim Luthy to erect a memorial in Victoria Park for "all children who lived all or part of their lives" in a Goulburn orphanage or a church institution.

== Daily routine and life ==
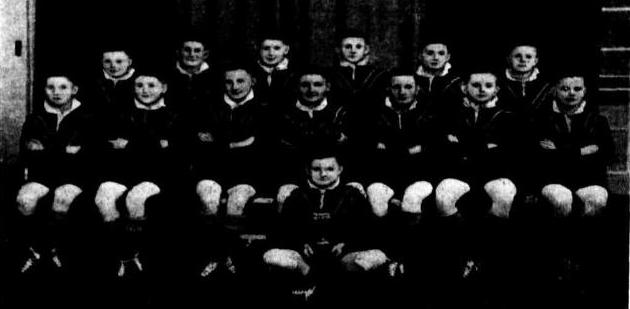
St. John's Orphanage Football Team, 1941

A school day at the orphanage would start at 6:00 a.m. with many morning chores to be completed, predominately cleaning. A mass would be held at 7:15 a.m., and breakfast would follow. Boys at the orphanage would then go to school. All boys over 14 were given a religious education at the Brother's Cathedral School, whereas the younger boys attended the infants' school at the Convent. All boys were also trained in technical education. Before leaving, the orphanage trained the boys in all classes of agriculture. This was so the boys were well educated and had the knowledge to become sufficient farmers when they left the orphanage.

At the end of the day, the boys would play sports, boxing, or other leisure activities, or have hockey or rugby league training if the weather was suitable. Weekends revolved mainly around sports. Field hockey, rugby league, and other sports were commonly played during the winter time. The boys of the orphanage had a well-known reputation in Goulburn for their sports abilities; boys who participated in tournaments and games usually did well, winning many trophies. The orphanage also had a football team. Sometimes, the boys would hold fetes or participate in annual concerts and operettas, where they would sing and dance.

Although all of the orphanage's residents were given a dose of Epsom salts once a week in the morning, some former residents have given accounts of brutal punishments and mistreatment. One states that because there were 200 boys and only 12 toilets, some would defecate in the urinals, drains, on the grass, or in their pants. As a result, the boys would receive beltings for doing this. Another account by a boy who stayed at the orphanage states that when he arrived there, he was separated from his brother and was given a set of clothes to wear despite having his own. Anyone who did not comply would receive a belting. The boys were issued no underwear and clothes were washed only once a week. Beatings were common, and not just for punishment; sometimes it may have been more for mental scarring. Other accounts claim there were beatings, and repetitive rape, not only by the staff but also by older boys and the orphanage caretaker. Despite this, some former residents say the nuns were "tough but fair" and they were fed three meals a day. Some even stayed in contact with their caregivers once they left.

== Status ==
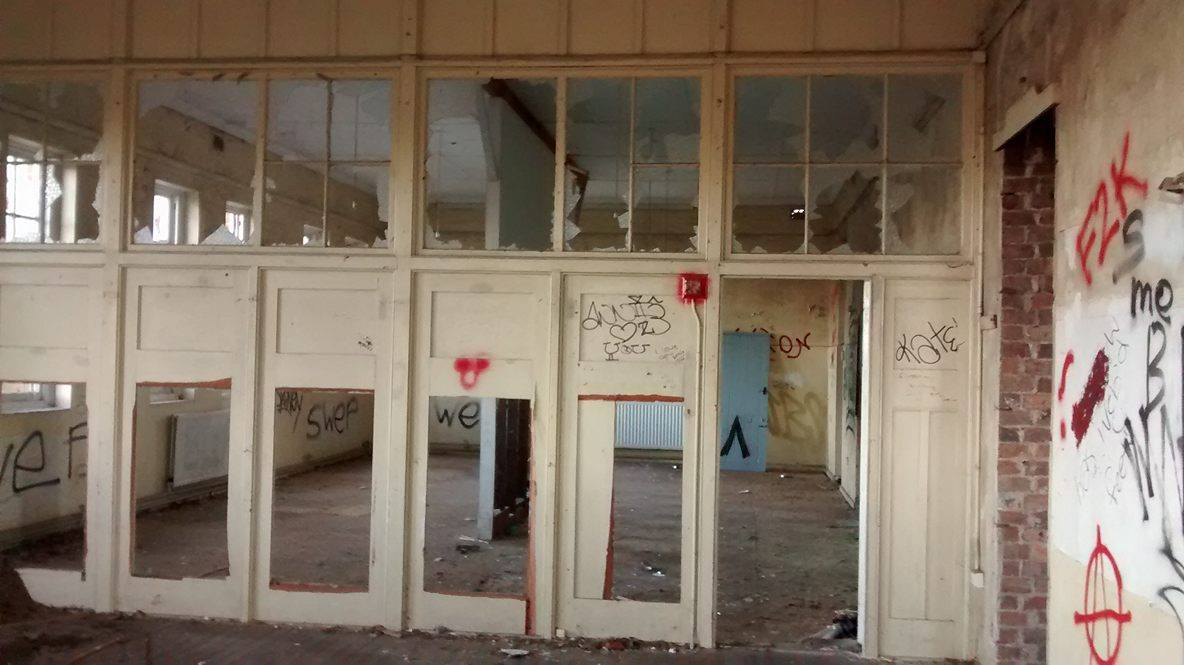
Damage due to vandalism in the southwestern wing

St John's orphanage was demolished and the site is now rubble, but the lot is owned by Australian businessman John Ferrara, who bought the orphanage and its surrounding grounds for $450,000 in 1999. Goulburn Ghost Tours has previously run ghost tours inside the orphanage, hoping to discourage vandals and youth from damaging the building. It is described as being a part of "Australia's Bermuda Triangle of haunted places", which includes Kenmore Asylum and St. Joseph's Orphanage. An occasional caretaker was also in place until the Catholic Church sold the building. (Note: According to some recent reports, there is still a caretaker who lives nearby the building.)

The orphanage site is listed as a heritage conservation area under Goulburn Mulwaree Council's Local Environment Plan, which recognises its significance as a former boy's institution run by the Sisters of Mercy and the Catholic Church. The social and community values of the building are also recognised.

=== Redevelopment and restoration ===
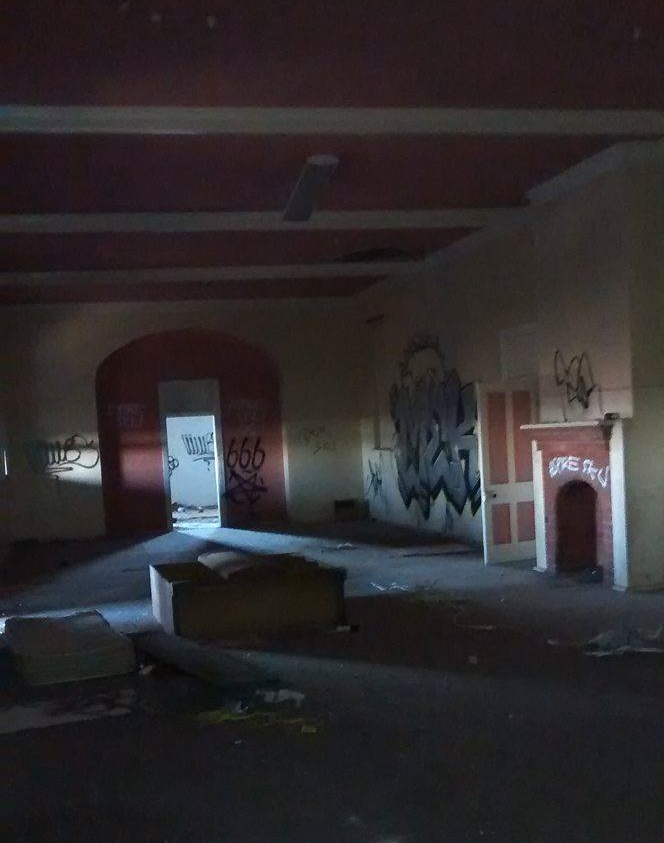
A room on the second floor. Graffiti and abandoned furniture are commonly seen throughout the complex

Before the demolition of the buildings, the orphanage had been heavily vandalised, with surrounding residents regularly calling the police because the sounds of windows smashing and people entering without permission can be heard and seen frequently. Small grass fires around the building had also been reported. Restorations have been considered by the Goulburn City Council. The council is holding Ferrara accountable for allowing damage at the orphanage, while he has come up with many development projects for the lot. As a result, city council has not issued Ferrara any development permits until restoration work to the orphanage is complete.

Ferrara has proposed a number of redevelopments for the orphanage itself, and its surroundings. In 2004, he proposed a plan to redevelop the lot and building into 63 residential units. The proposed redevelopment was known as Glebe Gardens. Ferrara planned the construction of gardens and pools on the vacant grounds, but the front of the complex would face no development. Although the development application was approved by the city council, the plans were dropped because the costs to redevelop the lot were too great. In 2009, work began to revamp the orphanage and convert it into a retirement village, with trees being cleared to construct a retaining wall. Two-metre-high walls were going to be built to keep vandals out and to prevent further damage. He also stated that he was going to the fix up the orphanage once the proposed townhouses were under construction.

In 2012, Ferrara proposed a new project to build 76 units and homes in seven stages; these stages would have spanned three to four years. Ferrara undertook a joint venture with Peter Madew, who was to assist with funding and the management needed for the construction. They also proposed restoration efforts to the orphanage, which included painting, repairing holes in walls, and replacing windows. They also planned to restore the front garden, commence general landscaping, construct a recreation area, and build a number of units in the orphanage itself; an indoor swimming pool was proposed for construction in the courtyard. However, Madew claimed that restoration of the orphanage would "cost millions". Ferrara later announced that he would not go ahead with the redevelopment, but instead lodge a new plan: this plan would foresee the construction of 18 new dwellings on the lot. This was objected to by the council should the building remain in its current deteriorating state. Ferrara responded by stating he would commit funds from his profits towards the building's restoration, at a cost of least $1.5 million. In late 2013, Ferrara proposed another development on the lot which would see the construction of 15 residential units. However, the Goulburn Mulwaree Council has demanded that Ferrara must schedule repairs to the orphanage before any approval can be granted. In response, Ferarra pledged to spend $250,000 on restoration works, covering downpipe, guttering, and roof repairs, as well as window replacements and external painting.

In November 2015, a fire, believed to have been left unattended by squatters, ignited the roof just before 4:00 p.m. It took approximately six hours to extinguish the fire, during which 80% of the roof was damaged. Much of the roof collapsed, exposing the timber frame skeleton, and some rooms were completely destroyed. Moments before the building caught on fire, there were unconfirmed reports that a loud bang was heard. The Goulburn Heritage Group stated that they were "upset and sickened" by the fire, and Ferrara responded by saying that he was disappointed, and that the building was not insured. Ferrara has stated that he will try to preserve the building, and estimates the damage costs at $4 million to $5 million. In 2016, another fire occurred in a building at the rear of the main structure, causing extensive damage. The building, which was revealed to be the old hall built in 1932, was deemed not salvageable; it was subsequently scheduled for demolition. Following the fire, the council ordered Ferrara to secure both the site and loose building materials such as roof iron. The fire was treated as suspicious, as witnesses claim that two people wearing backpacks were running from the building just before the fire occurred. Following the second fire, a third fire occurred in the building, in which a large portion of the building was completely destroyed.

In July 2021, the Goulburn Mulwaree Council ordered the remains of the former orphanage to be completely demolished. Demolition of the structure took place in early-mid 2023.

== See also ==
- Foster care in Australia
