= Goulburn Base Hospital =

- Southern NSW Local Health District

Geography
- Location: Goulburn, New South Wales, Australia
- Coordinates: type:landmark 34°44′51″S 149°42′47″E

Organisation
- Care system: Public Medicare (AU)
- Type: District
- Affiliated university: Australian National University

Services
- Emergency department: Yes
- Beds: 100+

Helipads
- Helipad: (ICAO: YXGH)
Number	Length		Surface
Number	ft	m	Surface
1			concrete

History
- Founded: 1833

Links
- Lists: Hospitals in Australia

Goulburn Base Hospital is a public district hospital located in the city of Goulburn, New South Wales in Australia. The hospital is situated on Goldsmith Street, approximately 1 km (0.62 mi) from the Central Business District. The hospital is operated by Southern NSW Local Health District and serves as a regional referral facility providing a range of general, surgical and some specialist services. It is a teaching hospital affiliated with the Australian National University, based in Canberra.

== Services ==
An 9 bed emergency department operates 24 hours. Goulburn Base Hospital has a 6 bed Intensive Care Unit for adult patients, specializing in high dependency and coronary care. Critical patients who are suffering from conditions the hospital is not equipped to handle are transferred to Canberra or Sydney. A helipad on the hospital grounds facilitates patient transfers and evacuations. A 20 bed rehabilitation ward was opened in 2013.

The Chisholm Ross Centre is a 32 bed inpatient psychiatric unit for patients suffering acute mental health conditions. Other specialist services provided include gastroenterology, ophthalmology a renal unit and a maternity ward. A variety of allied health services are also available on the hospital campus.

== History ==
=== Origin of the name ===
In worldwide usage, a base hospital is a military hospital located a safe distance from the battlefront to which patients from field hospitals are evacuated for follow up care. After World War I, the term was applied in Australia and New Zealand to large rural hospitals, which, by analogy, performed a similar function of providing specialist or follow up care for patients from smaller hospitals. For instance, in 1923, the NSW Minister for Public Health, Mr. Oakes, while speaking at Goulburn District Hospital, specifically proposed the establishment of rural base hospitals:

"There should be large and properly equipped base hospitals in the important centres and cottage hospitals scattered throughout the various country districts connecting with the larger institutions when necessary by motor service brigades."

In the following year, at the launching of a building fund for the hospital, reference was made to the need to provide adequate local funds to attract Government support (50% funding) for establishing a base hospital in Goulburn. The first base hospital established in NSW was Orange Base Hospital in November 1933.

However, a number of subsequent attempts to seek funding to bring Goulburn District Hospital up to base hospital standard were unsuccessful. It wasn't until 1940 that Goulburn Hospital was publicly referred to as a Base Hospital. At the 98th Annual General Meeting of the Hospital Committee, a Member of the Board, Mr. W. J. Lewis, was reported, apparently for the first time, as using this name for the hospital by saying:

"...the discussion was the outcome of an earlier reminder to subscribers that the treatment now being given to patients was not confined to Goulburn, but embraced areas within 100 miles radius. Mr. W. J. Lewis: It is the Goulburn 'Base' Hospital."

However, six years later, whatever the practical situation, Dr. R. V. Brotherton, the recent Colonel Registrar of Yaralla Military Hospital, then the largest hospital in the Southern Hemisphere, noted that official status was still not forthcoming.

Finally, in 1951, twenty eight years after it was first mooted, Goulburn District Hospital was gazetted as the sixth Base Hospital in NSW, meeting requirements including averaging more than 100 patients per day, and the provision of a children's ward and pathological, X-ray and obstetric units. The intent of the Base Hospital system was to treat major cases at important provincial centres, instead of sending patients to Sydney. Doctors at smaller centres would send their patients to base hospitals for specialised treatment.

Subsequent changes in health care policies have made the status of the Base Hospital terminology unclear. Although Goulburn remains the largest hospital in the Southern NSW Area Health District, the much larger Canberra Hospital in the neighbouring ACT is where many, more specialised, health treatments are provided. When Orange Base Hospital was redeveloped in 2011, the hospital was renamed Orange Health Service. However, there was significant community protest to return to the Base Hospital title, on the basis that the new name was confusing and that the old name better reflected the hospital's role as a regional hub. This has resulted in the official name being largely replaced in the media and common use by the term Orange Hospital. This may mean that if and when Goulburn Base Hospital is rebuilt or relocated its hard won "Base" title will be lost again.

=== Foundation of the hospital ===
The history of what was to become the current Goulburn Base Hospital goes back more than 180 years. Residents of County Argyle petitioned Governor Bourke for the provision of public services, including a hospital, in June 1832 on the occasion of his visiting Goulburn Plains. Governor Lachlan Macquarie had founded the Rum Hospital in Sydney in 1810 (completed 1816) despite the British Government's refusal to fund it, and established the policy of founding "Convict Hospitals" with funding from the Colony government in regional areas where demand justified this.

=== The Convict Hospital ===
A correspondent noted that work on a hospital had commenced by September 1833. Some were unhappy with the result, a complainant in the following year claiming that there was only one room in the facility, with not even a provision for a store or a morgue. He also claimed that the Government funds provided were being wasted, with the contractor seeking a contract variation despite using Government provided labour, possibly convicts.

In October 1836, a visitor to the old town of Goulburn (close to the Mulwaree Ponds – Wollondilly River junction), noted:

"…he [the Police Magistrate] also accompanied us to the new town, about a mile distant, where a few scattered buildings of brick and others of wood, had been erected. One of the latter is an [sic] hospital affording accommodation for about 30 patients. Like other places of this kind, in remote places, it was pretty fully occupied, by stock-men, and others of the lower order; victims of immorality, the scourge of this class, in sequestered parts of the Colony, frequented by the Aborigines."

A subscribers' committee was formed in 1842, and on 2 December 1842 the Governor transferred the "Convict Hospital" (Government hospital) to the committee, with the exception of some medical instruments which belonged to the military. By the second annual meeting in 1844, the committee could report the successful funding and running of the hospital. Subscribers paid an annual fee, and non-subscriber patients paid for care at a daily rate, which in some cases would be paid for by charities in the town. By 1848 the Secretary of the committee was a Mr. Kitson, with Captain William Hovell, one of the original petitioners of 1832, chairing the Public Meeting. Debate at that meeting centered on a conflict between those wishing to run the hospital cost efficiently by say, competitively tendering for services and by those supporting the medical staff making appropriate management decisions. One debater highlighted the issue:

"... and with respect to what Mr. Kitson said about the hospital working well, he Mr. D. believed it worked well, but that did not say it could not be made to work better (hear, hear) : be it remembered that the institution was not for the benefit of the medical gentlemen, but for the benefit of the public; the interests of medical men were nothing."

This 1848 report notes the dilapidated state of the hospital buildings and that £125 had been put to the erection of new buildings.

=== The new charity hospital ===
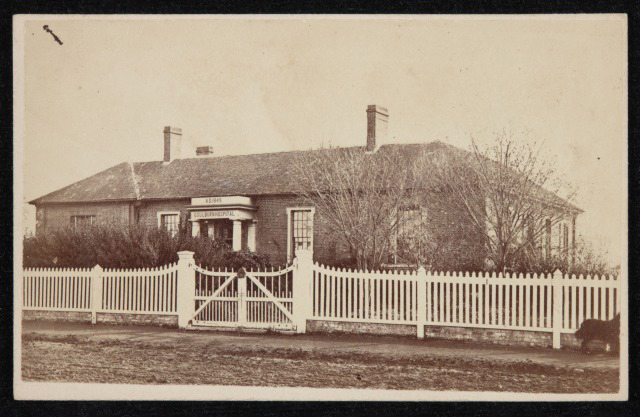
"AD 1849 Goulburn Hospital" – Photographed 1870

A new hospital was completed in September 1849, next to the previous weatherboard structure at the corner of Clifford and Sloane Streets, currently occupied by the Police Station. In contrast to the descriptions of the earlier government-funded building, an observer described it in 1857 as commodious and well run. The Rev. Willam Ross served as Subscribers' Committee Secretary for twenty years until his death in 1869, with Captain Hovell continuing as president for some of that time. A similar voluntary hospital business model applied to all general hospitals in NSW up to the 1950s. Despite the privatised charitable structure post 1842, much of the capital and half of the operating losses (shortfall) were being funded by State Government by 1913.

=== Current building ===
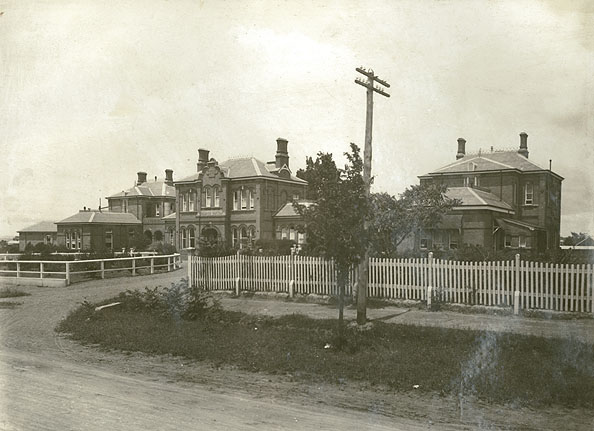
Goulburn Base Hospital, Goldsmith Street Entrance, 1889

The current main Goulburn Hospital building was designed by local architect E. C. Manfred in 1886. The official opening by mayor H.S. Gannon took place on 12 October 1889 attended by a crowd of about 1,000 residents. The hospital opened with a total of 24 beds – 14 for men and 10 for women. By June 1949, the hospital had grown to incorporate 182 beds, a pathology department and specialized X-ray equipment. A major upgrade to the hospital was constructed in the 1960s, providing room for the majority of inpatient services. By 2013 work had commenced on much needed upgrades, including $20 million in capital works allowing an expansion of the mental health facilities, construction of a new 20 bed sub-acute wing, addition of 3 beds to the emergency department as well as general renovations. A major electrical upgrade was completed as part of the works allowing extra medical equipment to be acquired for the operating theatre and imaging departments.

=== Future building ===
In 2014, it was announced an upgraded – or even new – hospital for Goulburn could soon be a reality following an announcement of $600,000 towards redevelopment plans by NSW Health Minister Jillian Skinner. "I do have a feeling though from some of my previous visits that part of the core of this hospital cannot be redeveloped because of the load bearing nature of the walls. "So that may mean ‘do we look at a new hospital alongside what is currently here, do we in-fill, demolish part of it, etc’- those are the kind of things that will need to be looked at in this planning process Ms Skinner said.

==== Planning ====
On 10 March 2015, Health Minister Skinner and Goulburn MP Pru Goward announced a re-elected Baird Government will invest $120 million for the major redevelopment of Goulburn Hospital. Skinner said works will begin on-site in the next term of the Baird Government, if re-elected on 28 March. "The need for a major upgrade at Goulburn Hospital is clear, which is why we are making this significant investment to ensure this facility can deliver first-class care for patients well into the future", Skinner said. "The upgrade of Goulburn Hospital will include improved capacity through fit-for-purpose infrastructure including the emergency department, intensive care unit and theatres, inpatient services and a comprehensive ambulatory care service. "Planning will continue over the coming months to identify what other services could be incorporated into the redevelopment." Mrs Skinner said the announcement will have wide-reaching benefits, particularly for the 16,000-plus patients who attend the Goulburn Hospital emergency department each year. "The Baird Government committed $600,000 in its first term to plan the upgrade of Goulburn and in our second term we are committed to this major redevelopment", "I’ve visited Goulburn Hospital on many occasions and the clinicians and community have been champions of this redevelopment. I know it will benefit them greatly and act as a magnet to attract staff to this region Ms Skinner said. Ms Goward said the funding will mark a new era in health care for Goulburn Hospital. "Goulburn Hospital is a strong thread in the fabric of our community. It is where we have welcomed new life and farewelled loved ones and I could not be prouder we are committing to its major redevelopment today", Ms Goward said."This has been a long road and I want to thank clinicians and the community for standing alongside me to champion this redevelopment – the need for it is clear. "Goulburn deserves a state-of-the-art hospital and under the Baird Government that is exactly what we will get.".

There has been some criticism since that announcement of the lack of progress with planning (for instance, the delayed decision as to the site of the new facilities), and claims prior to the NSW election on 28 March 2015 that the project was fully costed, appearing to be contradicted by announcements after the election of detailed assessments still to be completed.

==== Business model ====
The NSW Health Minister, Jillian Skinner, announced on 14 September 2016 that the five NSW hospitals, including Goulburn, that were covered by these election commitments for redevelopment, would be privatised. Under this business model, contracts to build and operate new hospitals would be put out to tender.

==== Redevelopment ====
Demolition of Springfield House and the Lady Grose Building (former nurses’ quarters) began on 31 August 2018 and completed in late March 2019, with earthworks for the new buildings then under way. The concrete pour for the main building of the development, the four storey Clinical Services Building, commenced on Tuesday 31 March 2020. By the final quarter of 2021, the erection of the new hospital sign indicated that the project was reaching final stages, and the projections were that the building would be complete by the end of the calendar year.

== Controversy ==
The Chisholm Ross Centre for mental health services has suffered from chronic understaffing since the commissioning of a 12-bed expansion in 2012. For at least the first four months, the extra capacity was totally unutilised because it could not be staffed, though the new facilities were in operation with twelve beds in the older facilities closed. Since then, some of this capacity has been taken up, but nurses continue, three years later, to refuse to work what they claim is excessive overtime, when requested do so by management in order to keep beds open in the absence of the required permanent staff.

Doctors at the hospital have been publicly critical of the facilities and the management. Criticisms in 2014 included that the buildings had been added to in an uncoordinated fashion and were therefore not suitable for modern care, and that management forced surgeons to work in unsuitable operating facilities in order to save money. The former Base Hospital surgeon who wrote this letter to the editor also stated that:

"A recent comment by a politician that the opinion of doctors in Goulburn over the years has been dismissed as simply being self-serving epitomises the problem."

This quotation demonstrates that the controversy around who should best make decisions for the hospital, medical staff or management, continues to rage much as it did in the 1840s.

== Statistics ==
In figures published by the Australian Government's My Hospital website, in the 2013–2014 financial year, Goulburn Base Hospital performed 1,429 elective surgeries and in 2015–2016 handled 17,101 emergency department presentations. For the years 2010–11 to 2015–16, waiting times in the emergency department were longer than the national average across all triage classifications other than the most urgent, resuscitation, where target treatment period was met 100% of the time. Goulburn is the worst-performing hospital in its class of medium regional hospitals for the less urgent waiting categories. However, waiting times for elective surgery waiting times compared favourably to their peer hospital average. The hospital's 2010 operating budget was $35.03 million, but by 2016–2017 this had grown to $53M. and by 2021-22 was $74M. For comparison, the hospital redevelopment budget is just over 1 & 1/2 times this operating budget, illustrating the high ratio of operating costs to capital in modern hospital systems.
