= Greater Southern Area Health Service =

- Greater Southern Area Health Service logo

Agency overview
- Formed: January 2005
- Preceding agency: Southern Area Health Service and Greater Murray
- Dissolved: 31 December 2010
- Superseding agency: Murrumbidgee Local Health Network and Southern NSW Local Health Network
- Headquarters: Queanbeyan, New South Wales
- Minister responsible: John Della Bosca, Minister for Health; (etc.)
- Agency executive: Heather Gray, Chief Executive
- Parent agency: New South Wales Department of Health
- Website: www.gsahs.nsw.gov.au

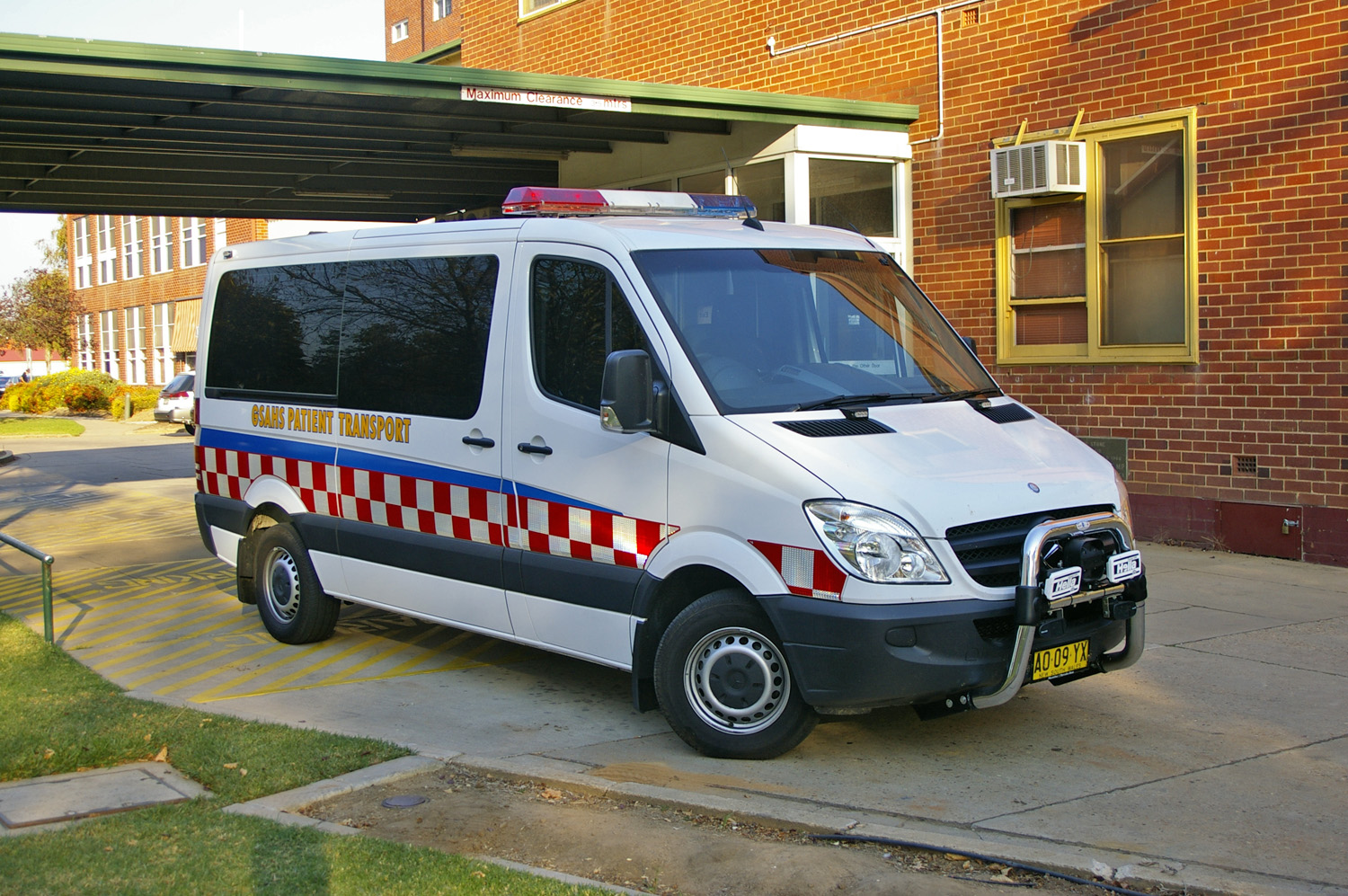
GSAHS Patient Transport vehicle

Greater Southern Area Health Service, abbreviated GSAHS, was formed in January 2005 from the amalgamation of the former Greater Murray Area Health Service and Southern Area Health Service. It was a statutory body of the Government of New South Wales, operating under the NSW Department of Health, charged with the provision of public health services in southern New South Wales. The head office of GSAHS was located in Queanbeyan.

== Major facilities ==
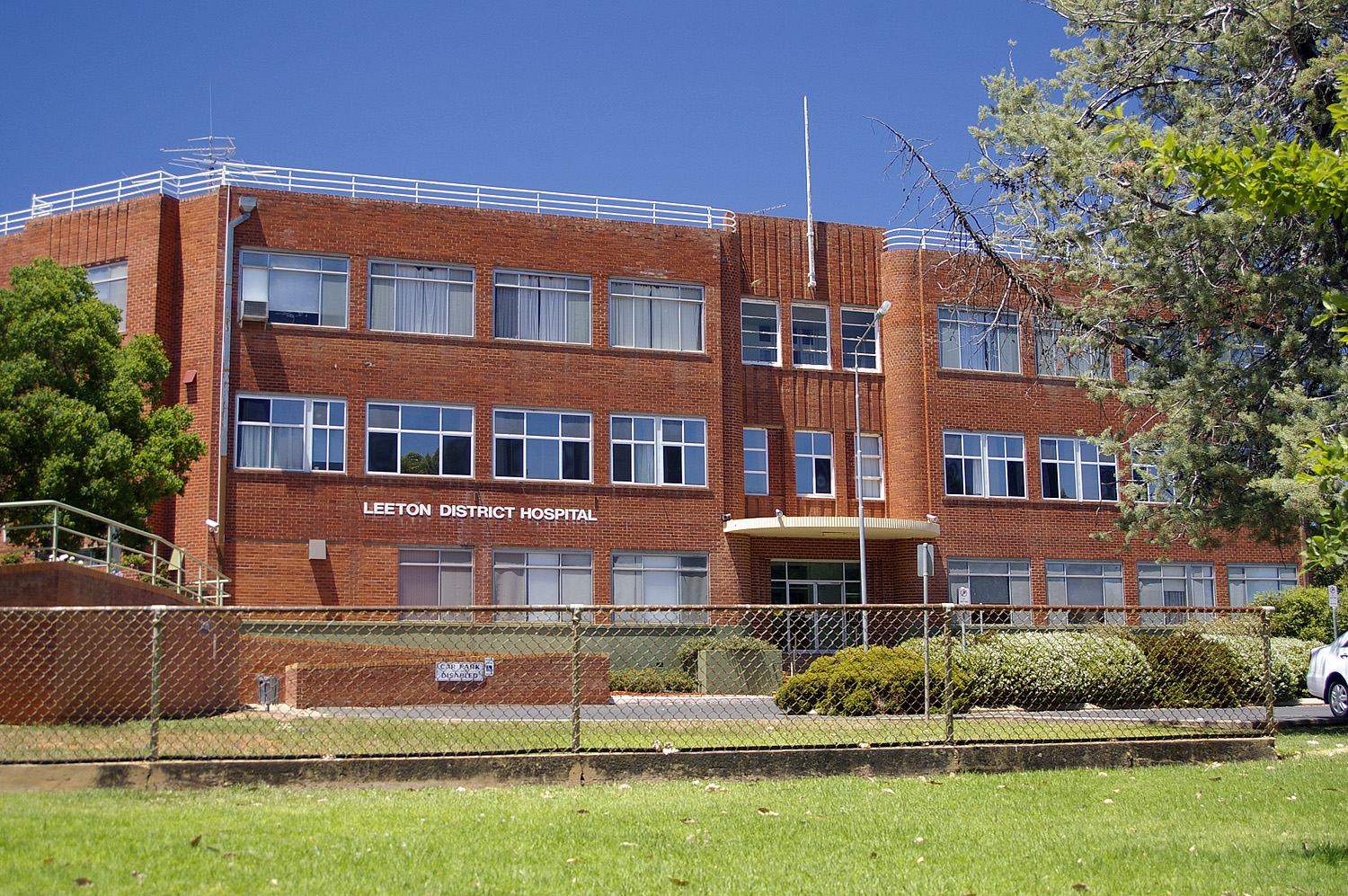
Leeton District Hospital

- Albury Base Hospital - Albury
- Bateman's Bay District Hospital - Batemans Bay
- Bega District Hospital - Bega
- Cooma Hospital - Cooma
- Cootamundra District Hospital - Cootamundra
- Goulburn Base Hospital - Goulburn
- Griffith Base Hospital - Griffith
- Gundagai Hospital - Gundagai
- Grenfell District Hospital - Grenfell
- Hay Hospital - Hay
- Leeton District Hospital - Leeton
- Lockhart and District Hospital - Lockhart
- Narrandera District Hospital - Narrandera
- Queanbeyan Hospital - Queanbeyan
- Wagga Wagga Base Hospital - Wagga Wagga
- Yass District Hospital - Yass
- Young District Hospital - Young
