= Edmund Manfred =

Australian architect

E.C. Manfred
- Born: 5 June 1856; Kensington, London
- Died: 20 February 1941 (aged 84); Goulburn, New South Wales
- Occupation: Architect
- Buildings: St. John's Orphanage (1912); St. Joseph's Orphanage (1905)

Edmund Cooper Manfred (5 June 1856 – 20 February 1941) often referred as E.C. Manfred was an English born Australian architect who was prominent for his works for designing well known and iconic buildings in Goulburn, New South Wales.

== Early life ==
Manfred was born on 5 June 1856 in Kensington, London. He was the only child of Mr. Edward Manfred, who was an architect and surveyor. By 1870, Manfred and his widowed mother sailed to join their family in Sydney, who had already settled in Manly. Manfred completed his education and undertook training as an architect.

== Work ==
Manfred was a qualified architect who designed most iconic buildings and parks in Goulburn, including the town hall, Goulburn Hospital, Belmore Park, St. John's Orphanage and St. Joseph's Orphanage in Kenmore. As well as that, Manfred was a member of the Royal Society of New South Wales and the Royal Historical Society of New South Wales.

== Death ==
Manfred died on 20 February 1941 at the age of 84. He was survived by six sons, three who had predeceased him. By the time of his death, he had played a prominent role in the civic and business life of Goulburn for more than 60 years. A plaque was erected in the St Saviour's Cathedral to commemorate him, as he was associated with the building. The State Library of New South Wales opened a collection of Manfred's works in 2013, with the first exhibitions opened on 24 February.

== Gallery ==
Below are some photographs of some notable works by Manfred:

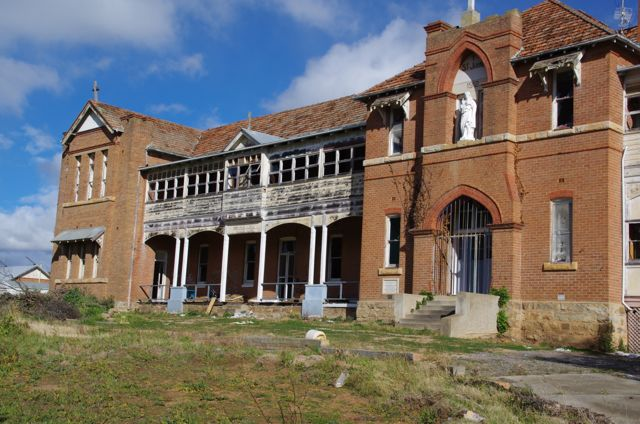
St. John's Orphanage in Goulburn, New South Wales (1912)

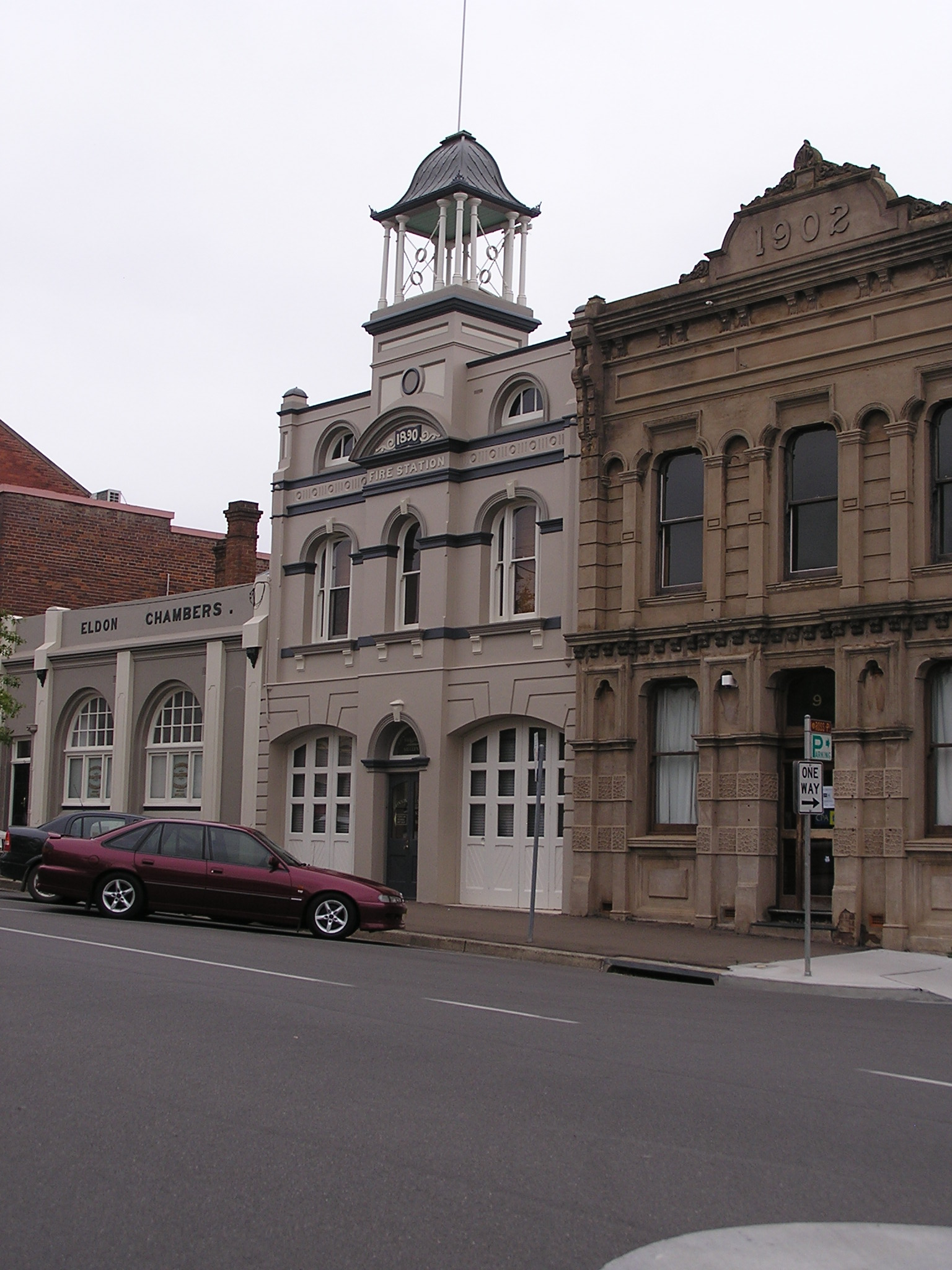
Goulburn's first permanent fire station (1890)

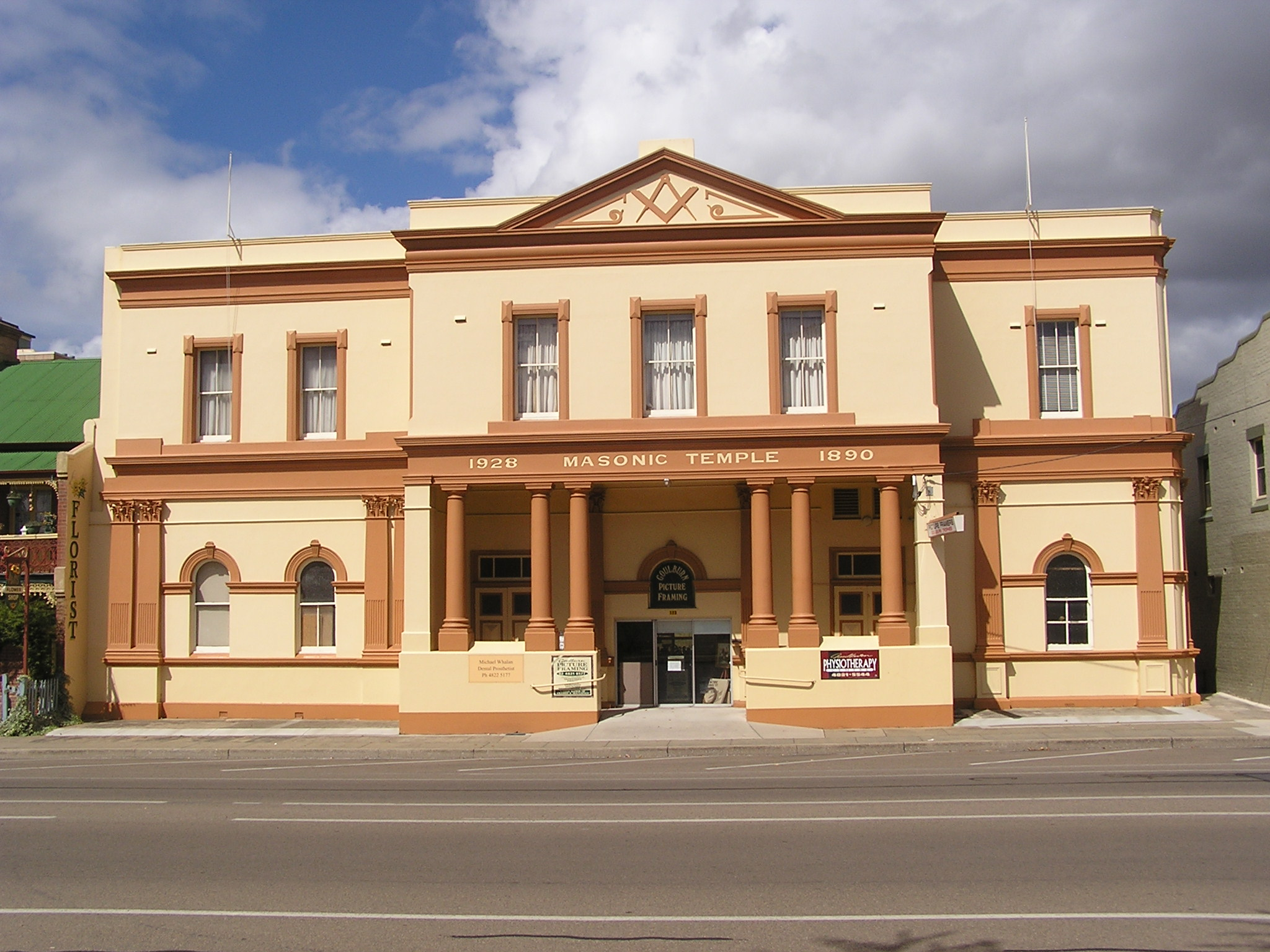
Masonic Temple (1928)
