= Wagga Wagga Base Hospital =

Coordinates: 35°7′6″S 147°21′28″E

Wagga Wagga Rural Referral Hospital
- Murrumbidgee Local Health District
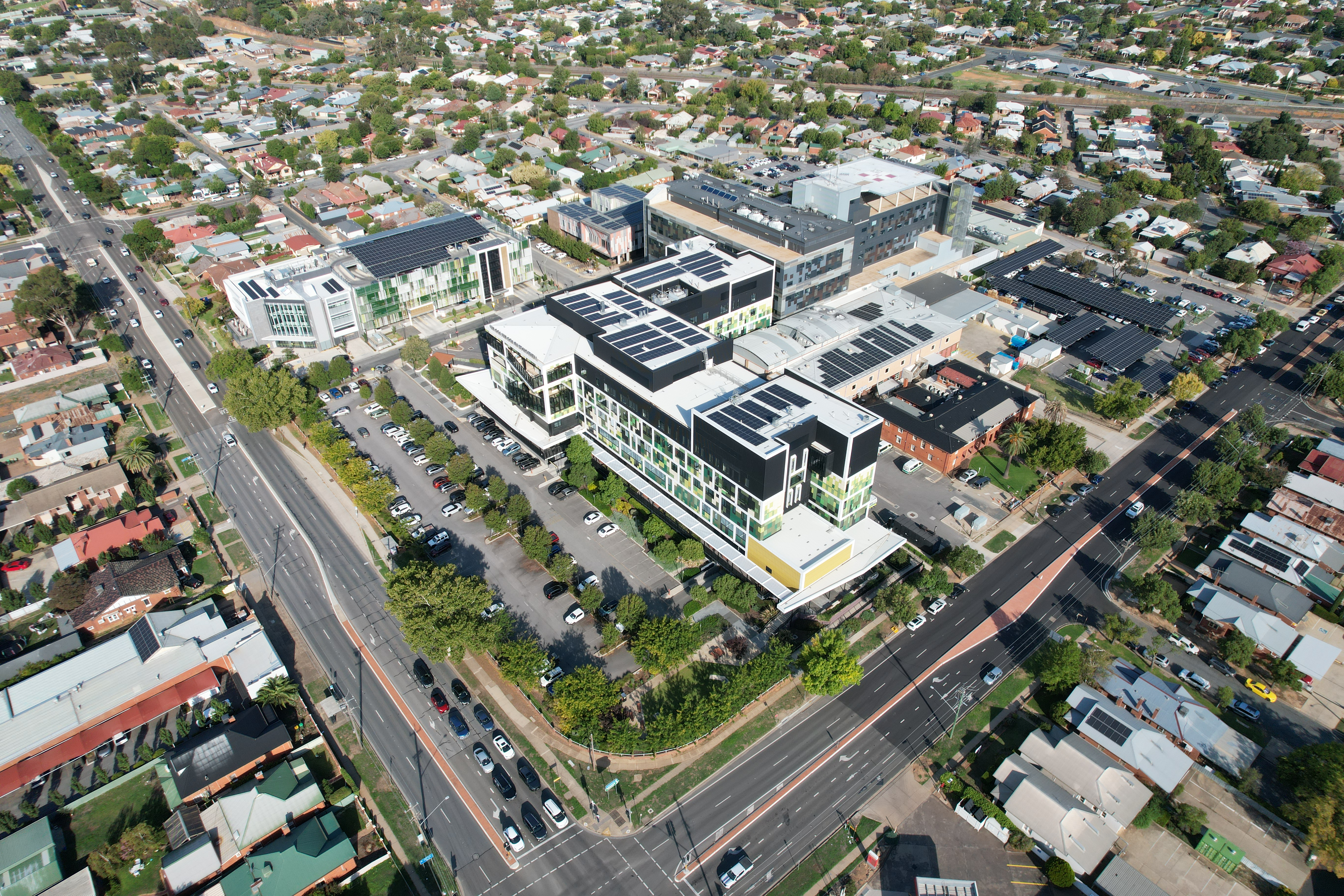

Geography
- Location: Wagga Wagga, New South Wales, Australia

Organisation
- Care system: Public Medicare (AU)
- Type: General
- Affiliated university: Charles Sturt University, University of New South Wales

Services
- Emergency department: Yes
- Beds: 325

Helipads
- Helipad: (ICAO: YXWG)
Number	Length		Surface
Number	ft	m	Surface
1			concrete

History
- Founded: 1865 (District), 1938 (Base), 2016 (Rural Referral)

Links
- Lists: Hospitals in Australia
- Other links: Wagga Wagga Health Service Redevelopment Project

Wagga Wagga Base Hospital, briefly named Wagga Wagga Rural Referral Hospital, is located in the City of Wagga Wagga, the largest inland city of New South Wales, Australia. The hospital is the largest in the region, providing medical services to the wider Riverina. It is the regional referral hospital for outlying areas, and provides medical, surgical, orthopaedic, psychiatric and paediatric inpatient services in addition to emergency care. The hospital also provides a range of allied health services including pharmacy, physiotherapy, social work, dietetics and speech pathology. Wagga Wagga also is home to a private hospital, Calvary Hospital, which is also important for the region and also mental health unit.

== History ==
The hospital was founded as Wagga Wagga District Hospital in 1865 and a number of its early buildings were designed by William Monks, a local architect. in 1938 it became known as Wagga Wagga Base Hospital.

== Redevelopment ==
On 30 November 2007 the Greater Southern Area Health Service publicly released the concept plans of the new base hospital which will be located on the current hospital site and cost an estimated $275 million which will have a total of 230 beds.

Stage one of the redevelopment was a 50 bed mental health unit with construction beginning in March 2012 and completed in October 2013.

Stage two, the construction of the acute hospital building, commenced in December 2013 and was completed in December 2015, with patients moved into the new hospital in January 2016. As part of the redevelopment, the hospital was renamed as Wagga Wagga Rural Referral Hospital.

Stage three of the redevelopment included $30 million towards a new multi-storey car park which created 350 additional car spaces. The car park is intended for visitors, staff and patients as it includes all day parking on the top level. It was completed in July 2023 after many delays due to the weather during construction and the scaffolding company going bankrupt.
