= Orange Health Service =

- Western New South Wales Local Health District

Geography
- Location: Bloomfield Health Campus, Orange, New South Wales, Australia
- Coordinates: 33°19′00″S 149°05′37″E

Organisation
- Care system: Public Medicare (AU)
- Type: Teaching

Services
- Emergency department: Yes
- Beds: 190

Helipads
- Helipad: (ICAO: YXOG)
Number	Length		Surface
Number	ft	m	Surface
1			concrete

History
- Founded: 2011

Links
- Lists: Hospitals in Australia

The Orange Health Service is a public hospital located on the Bloomfield Health Campus, approximately 4 km (2.5 mi) south of the city Orange, New South Wales in Australia and is operated by Western NSW Local Health District.

Orange Health Service was opened in 2011, co-located with the redeveloped Bloomfield psychiatric hospital and replacing Orange Base Hospital as a referral hospital for the Central West region. The facility provides a range of general, surgical and specialist services, in particular forensic psychiatry and cancer treatment. It is a teaching hospital affiliated with the University of Sydney but is also used for teaching students from other universities including the Charles Sturt University and University of Wollongong.

== Services and facilities ==
In addition to a 24-hour Emergency Department, Orange Health Service provides a 12-bed critical care unit for adult patients, with dedicated high dependency and coronary care beds, and is able to treat patients with a range of serious and life-threatening conditions including burns and trauma. The hospital is not equipped to perform neurosurgery or heart surgery and patients are transferred to other facilities for these procedures. A rooftop helipad facilitates aeromedical transfers and patient retrieval.

The hospital is equipped with five operating theatres and two purpose built radiotherapy bunkers. Specialist services provided include gastroenterology, Renal dialysis, orthopedics as well as maternity and rehabilitation wards. Diagnostic services such as pathology and medical imaging, including interventional radiology are also available.

Orange Health Service is equipped with two linear accelerators for the administration of radiation therapy as well as onsite carer's accommodation. Orange Health Service was the first public hospital west of the Blue Mountains to be equipped with such technology.

Orange and Region Mental Health and Drug & Alcohol (MHDA) Services is based out of the hospital and provides a variety of mental health support and specialist treatment programs. Bloomfield Campus provides inpatient psychiatric facilities and is the region's referral centre for mental health patients, and also accepts patients from other areas of the state.

Ronald McDonald House Charities in co-operation with the Royal Far West Children's Health Scheme operate the Ronald McDonald Care Mobile, a purpose built mobile pediatric clinic providing diagnosis, treatment, referral and management of on-going medical conditions to residents in isolated communities throughout the region from a base at the Bloomfield Campus, as well as providing up to 20 accommodation units for families of sick children. It is the first Ronald McDonald House in Australia to specifically cater for families of children suffering from mental illness.

== History ==
=== Bloomfield Hospital ===
The Bloomfield Hospital, formerly the Orange Mental Hospital, opened in 1924. Established as one of three major mental hospitals to service rural New South Wales, Bloomfield Hospital was designed as a village where patients could live and work in a therapeutic environment. The grounds incorporated orchards and vineyards, as well as recreational facilities including its own golf course.

In January 2011, the murder of a senior member of the nursing staff by a psychiatric patient while on duty at the hospital attracted national media attention and triggered simultaneous investigations by the Health Department, State Coroner and police. The incident was the first involving the death of a health worker while on duty in the state since 1994 and also saw the patient charged with the attempted murder of a second nurse.

Bloomfield Mental Hospital, was officially opened in November 1925. By the end of World War II, the mental hospital was home to 1596 male and female patients who were housed separately in the various buildings on the site.

Ten years later the number of residents remained relatively stable with 1450 living at the facility. Bloomfield was almost self-sufficient in the early days with its own dairy herd, laundry, morgue, bootmaker, hairdresser, dentist, chapel, and with meals cooked for patients in their individual accommodation buildings. It was in many ways a small town that had the Bloomfield Recreation Hall at the heart of many social activities, including dances for patients and live theatre productions facilitated by the many staff at the hospital who included migrants who left Europe after World War II.

The community interacted with residents of the facility by attending the annual fete held on the oval (now Country Club Oval) and attending live productions in the hall. Once a week staff escorted patients on bus trips to Orange, so they could do their shopping. Over the years, the healthcare model has evolved and now includes a strong move towards peer support to offer recovery and hope for residents.

=== Orange Base Hospital ===
To supplement and replace the original Orange District Hospital (demolished in 1959), Orange Base Hospital opened on 9 November 1933 and was the first "base" hospital — a hospital designed to support a large regional area as well as the immediate township — in New South Wales. By 2003, the Orange Base Hospital site, located a few blocks from the CBD had become congested and outdated. Analysis by the government found redevelopment of the site would be difficult due to a number of constraints, including difficulty in maintaining hospital capacity and capability during any works and likely community opposition, especially if the psychiatric facilities at Bloomfield were relocated to the redeveloped site.

By contrast, the Bloomfield property was preferred as it was far less constrained and already in use as a health facility, on land already owned by the Department of Health, adjacent to vacant Crown land which provided room for expansion. The site would allow integration with the psychiatric facilities already in operation while allowing the existing Base Hospital to continue to operate during construction.

A two-day operation from 15 to 16 March 2011 saw all patients transferred to the new Orange Health Service.

The Ian Armstrong Building now stands at the former hospital site, and houses the headquarters of NSW Department of Primary Industries and offices of other state government departments.

=== Orange Health Service ===
After 10 years of planning and construction and a cost of $250 million, the new hospital was officially opened by Minister for Health Carmel Tebbutt on 17 March 2011. Built under a public–private partnership arrangement between the New South Wales Government and a consortium named Pinnacle Health Care led by construction company Hansen Yuncken, the 32,000 m^{2} (340,000 sq ft) hospital also incorporates a number of refurbished heritage-listed buildings that were part of the original Bloomfield Hospital.

In May 2012, members of Orange City Council lobbied to have the name of the new hospital changed back to "Orange Base Hospital" in response to concerns expressed within the community and medical profession that the current name is confusing and does not properly represent the hospital's role as a regional medical hub. It was argued that many smaller clinics are referred to as "health services" as they do not provide the same level of services expected from a major hospital.

NSW Health have since announced a policy change in that the hospital will soon revert to the name of "Orange Hospital" within the "Orange Health Service".

== Transport ==
As a major regional hospital, Orange Health Service is served by limited public transport services. Orange Buslines route 537 connects the Bloomfield Campus to the Orange CBD six days per week (no services on Sunday), via Orange railway station allowing connection with NSW TrainLink regional services.

== Statistics ==
Statistics for the 2011-2012 financial year published by the Australian Government's My Hospital website show Orange Health Service conducted 3,049 elective surgeries and handled 27,272 Emergency Department presentations. Waiting times in the emergency department were typically shorter than the national average. Elective surgery waiting times were shorter than the national average for similar hospitals in all measures except for non urgent elective surgeries. In this category, waiting times were longer, with 81% of patients were treated within clinically recommended timeframes, compared to an average of 87% at comparable hospitals.

== See also ==
- List of hospitals in Australia
