= Bloomfield Hospital, Orange =

Heritage-listed former hospital in New South Wales, Australia

Bloomfield Hospital
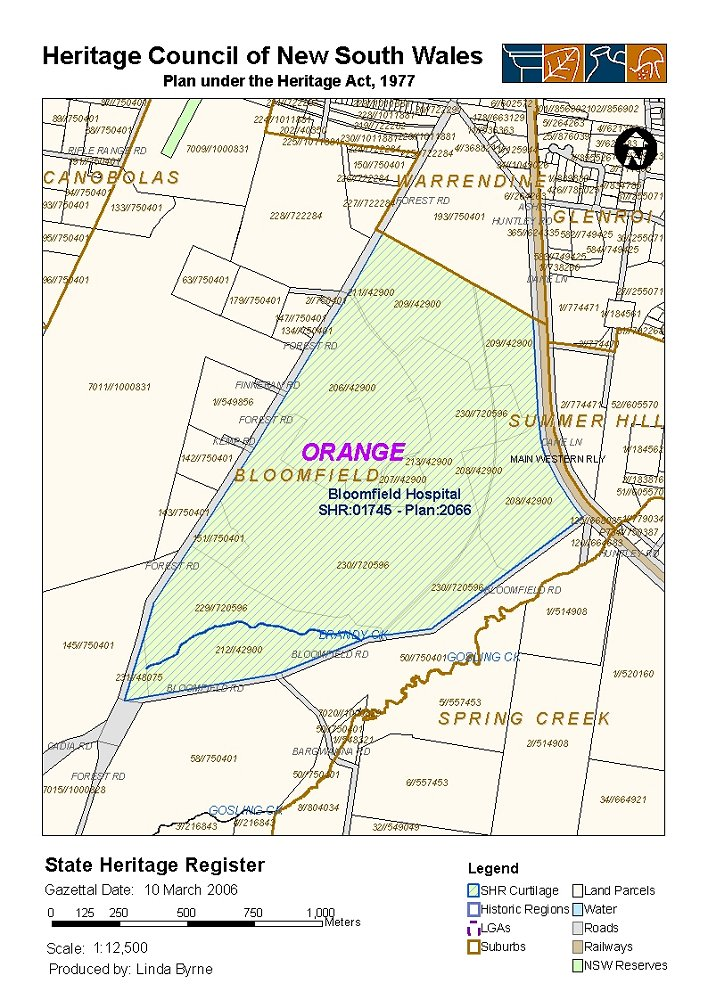
- Heritage boundaries

- Location within New South Wales Location within Australia
- 33°19′04″S 149°05′42″E
- Location: Forest Road, Orange, City of Orange, New South Wales, Australia

History
- Built: 1923–1931

Site notes
- Architects: Walter Liberty Vernon; George McRae
- Owner: Orange Ex-services Club

New South Wales Heritage Register
- Official name: Bloomfield Hospital; Orange Mental Hospital
- Type: State heritage (landscape)
- Designated: 10 March 2006
- Reference no.: 1745
- Type: Historic Landscape
- Category: Landscape – Cultural

Bloomfield Hospital is a heritage-listed former psychiatric hospital at Forest Road, Orange, City of Orange, New South Wales, Australia. It was designed by Walter Liberty Vernon and George McRae and built from 1923 to 1931. It is also known as Orange Mental Hospital. The property is owned by NSW Health (Crown Land). It was added to the New South Wales State Heritage Register on 10 March 2006.

== History ==
At the turn of the nineteenth century, institutions for the mentally ill were fast becoming overcrowded. In response to this pressure and the demand for treatment of rural based mentally ill patients, Frederick Norton Manning, Inspector General for the Insane, proposed that a number of hospitals for the mentally ill be established in rural areas. Under his guidance, Kenmore Psychiatric Hospital was built in Goulburn in 1897. In 1898 Eric Sinclair took over from Manning and continued the work of developing rural based psychiatric hospitals with the Morisset Hospital completed in 1910.

In 1889, 260 hectares (640 acres) south of Orange was secured and dedicated for the future development of a Mental Hospital yet it was not until 1909 that a general site plan for the Mental Hospital at Orange was developed by Government Architect Walter Liberty Vernon.

The north-eastern buildings within (today's) Riverside or Bloomfield North precinct were designed in 1910, approved for construction in 1922 as the First World War intervened. The construction of the hospital was further delayed until 1923, when work on the first of the hospital buildings began. This was the upper precinct.

The construction of the hospital building was assisted by patients as well as local carpenters, labourers and craftsmen. The patients had been transferred from the Gladesville Mental Hospital and in 1923 the Orange and District Illustrated Times noted that many of those patients were discharged due to the improvement of their condition through the work. By October 1925 the Admissions and Convalescent Sections on the eastern part of the site had been completed and accommodated 270 patients from other overcrowded institutions. The official opening by Acting Inspector for the Insane, Dr W. A. Couttie was held in November 1925. Between 1925 and 1931 the wards, Administration, service buildings workshops, kitchen, Recreation Hall and Nurses Home and staff accommodation were constructed on the western part of the site.

The hospital was built to facilitate the late nineteenth century and early twentieth century theories of the treatment of the mentally ill propounded by Manning and later developed by Eric Sinclair. Manning championed a shift from seeing institutions for the mentally ill as asylums or places of confinement to being places for the treatment of the patient's illness where the architecture and setting of the hospital was integral to patients treatment. During his term as Director General for the Insane he worked to further eliminate the stigma of mental illness by ensuring that medical practitioners alone were responsible for scheduling mentally ill patients. Doctors were charged with the administration of the hospitals and the treatment of patients.

Sinclair further developed Manning's ideas infusing them with the newer "scientific" theories on Mental Illness such as the germ theory of mental illness which maintained that mental illness was most responsive to treatment in its early stages. This theory emphasised the benefits of quarantining "curable" patients from those with more intractable forms of illness.

The design of Bloomfield ensures patients perceived to be able to be rehabilitated were accommodated in the eastern area of the site in the Admissions Ward, completed in 1923 and the Convalescent Wards which were finished by 1924. The initial building programme was only completed in 1925. The Government Architect in this period was George McRae (1912–1923). The upper precinct adopted the symmetrical layout as a master plan in the form of an axis with lateral wings in sympathy with the site's topography. The Male Wards were located to the left or north-west of the main axis and the matching Female Wards to the right or south-east of the axis. Administration and management used the lower Riverside precinct for admissions and classification of patients and treatment of those expected to recover in a relatively short period. Those with little hope of recovery were regarded as long-term patients and accommodated in the upper Bloomfield South precinct, according to their gender and illness. The upper precinct's construction commenced in 1922, with the majority of buildings completed by 1935.

Patients suffering more debilitating and profound disturbance were accommodated in the nine wards spanning the north–south ridge in the western part of the site (completed between 1927 and 1931).The eastern and western areas were separated by landscaped gardens and playing fields. In each of these areas further separation of patients was accommodated with wards for men and women, separate wards for female and male sick and infirm, and for men and women considered "quiet and industrious" and those with more challenging and entrenched behaviours - the "violent and noisy " wards. All the buildings and wards at the hospital were specifically designed to reflect the proportions and style of domestic architecture to ally the impression of being an institution of confinement.

The setting in which patients were treated was considered to be of utmost importance and much attention was paid to the planting of both formal gardens and of parklands across the hospital property. Wards were built to take advantage of light and ensure easy access to fresh air. The hospital was planned to be a virtually self sustainable community with patients growing vegetables and fruit and in earlier times tending the dairy and piggery.

Like all patients experiencing mental illness, patients at Bloomfield, were committed by law to receive treatment at a mental hospital. In 1900 the classification of those who were able to be committed was expanded to include alcoholics and inebriates with serious behavioural problems. Bloomfield was the first hospital to be licensed to treat these patients. In the 1930s new psychiatric treatments for the mentally ill such as hypnosis, use of bromides, fever therapy, coma therapy and leucotomy were being implemented in the state's hospitals. Bloomfield was well equipped to keep abreast with these new therapies having a purpose-built operating theatre included in the schedule of hospital building completed by 1931.

Recreational and occupational therapy developed as important forms of treatment at Bloomfield from 1929 and the value of sporting activity was recognised from early on. The first cricket pitch was established near the most northern entrance to the side. During the 1930s this pitch and adjoining area (39 hectares (96 acres) in total) was redeveloped as Bloomfield Aerodrome. A second pitch, located on land between t he eastern and western part of the site was developed in 1928. This Cricket Ground became a focal point for patients, staff and visitors over the years.

An important addition to the hospital was the construction of two TB Wards in 1934. These Wards were built in response to a decade or more of measures put in place to control the epidemic spread of TB. The Women's TB Ward was located at the eastern end of the Convalescent Section and the Male TB Ward was located at the end of the Male Wards in the western part of the site. Both wards had north-east facing airing yards considered essential to the design of such wards at the time. The wards were unusual in that they were two of the few attached to Mental Hospitals and as such posed the architectural challenge of ensuring patients remained confined and isolated from the broader population while still providing access the therapeutic effects of sunlight and fresh air.

The majority of the buildings were created in the period up to 1935.

The War years saw characteristic shortages at the hospital including the dearth of male staff members. This was coupled with an influx of patients from Kenmore which was used for military purposes and resulted in overcrowding for the patients and an increasing workload for the mainly female staff. Overcrowding remained a difficulty after the war and there was little progress in the development of effective treatments or the improvement of facilities at the Orange Mental Hospital.

During the 1950s new behaviour stabilising drug treatments such as largactil and lithium and the provision of community care to patients were implemented to reduce the demand for mental hospital accommodation. Nevertheless, Bloomfield, as Orange Mental Hospital was renamed in 1954, remained a large hospital with a routine of therapeutic treatments and activities. The emphasis creating links with the local community through sporting and cultural activities was continued at this time with the establishment of a Dramatic Society which involved patients and staff in regular productions. Performances were attended by those associated with the hospital and members of the wider Orange Community. The Society was the precursor to the recently formed, semi-professional Orange Theatre Company.

During the 1960s another incentive to promote patient integration into the community was the establishment of a Bloomfield Branch of the Country Women's Association. Patients belonging to the Branch to participate in choral and drama performance and various fund raising activities. In 1965 a nine-hole golf course was established on the site, a third sporting field Pringle Park was established just below the Male Wards and a new laundry complex servicing the Central West area hospitals was built.

In 1983 the Richmond Report recommended a major overhaul of the operation of Mental Health Services which focused on separating services for the mentally ill and those with developmental disability and the rehabilitation those with mental illness back into the community with the support of community services. In the mid-1980s the Admission and Convalescent Sections of Bloomfield were "removed from Bloomfield and consolidated as the Riverside Centre". (2004, NSW Government Architects Office. Preliminary Heritage Assessment). Also around this time an acclaimed clinical community rehabilitation scheme was piloted out of Bloomfield. This program, the elite Housing Integrated Program Support (SHIPS), is still operating in Bathurst and Orange.

In 1986 Bloomfield came under the administration of the Central West Health Services and the program of deinstitutionalisation continued, reducing the number of beds available at Bloomfield to 274 and it number of patients to 197 in 1989. A review of the hospital's operations in 1989 recommended that the two storey ward blocks be decommissioned. The wards treating those with dementia were also earmarked for closure in this report. In the early 1990s a new Admissions unit was built, a Short Stay Unit was built and an Aged Care Unit was also built.

In 2005 the site was considered for redevelopment which will integrate a new Base Hospital for Orange into the Mental Health Services operating from the site.

In April 2009, the Government approved rezoning of 171 hectares (420 acres) of land at Bloomfield to provide land for future urban residential and commercial developments. The land was identified because of its proximity to employment uses such as the Bloomfield Hospital and a new private hospital. The rezoning permits a range of new land uses, including: nearly 93 hectares (230 acres) zoned for special activities for the continued operation of the Orange Agricultural Institute; nearly 68 hectares (170 acres) zoned for low density residential development, with the capacity to yield around 800 dwellings; over 11 hectares (27 acres) across two tracts of land zoned for a range of uses servicing the adjacent medical, recreational, residential and industrial precincts.

== Description ==
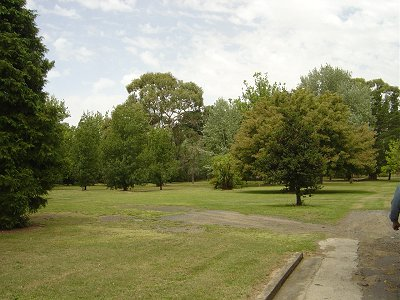
Landscaped grounds

Bloomfield Hospital is located on Forest Road in the south-eastern outskirts of the city of Orange. The Hospital comprises two distinct groupings of buildings and their setting of landscaped and park like gardens and playing fields

The earliest buildings developed on the site lie on a ridge (north-south) to the east of the site and comprise the original Admissions Section (designed 1910) and Convalescent Section (designed in the Inter-war period). The Admissions Section comprises a two-storey central administration building built in the Federation Arts and Crafts style and two single storey wards. All these buildings are constructed of face brick, the second storey of the administration block being rendered with stucco and painted. The roof of the administration wing is tiled with terracotta tiles as are the ward buildings. The western side of the administration block features a columned entry porch and adjacent Dutch gables which are edged with stone copings. The ward building also have stone edged gable ends. The wards comprise central dormitories and wings of single room accommodation.

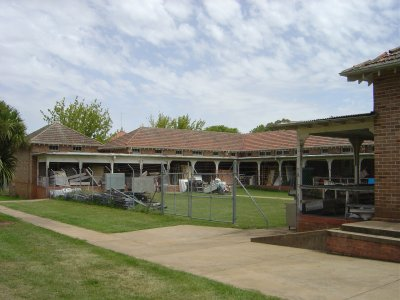
Female wards

To the south of the Admission section lie the five buildings comprising the Convalescent Section designed to accommodate "curable" cases away from the influence of more seriously disturbed patients. These buildings are of the Inter War Arts and Craft style of architecture with some Inter War Neo Georgian influence. The Convalescent Section Administration building is of two storeys with a recessed veranda on the front face and a shingled balcony above. This has since been enclosed. The wards are two story brick buildings with wide verandas on the north eastern elevation. The verandas are supported by circular columns.

Other buildings on the eastern part of the Bloomfield site include the former Nurses Home 1 (now Tallow Wood Hostel). This two storey brick building is designed in the Inter War Georgian Style featuring a columned portico on the main elevation and an upper level veranda at the rear of the u-shaped building. There are also residences for the "Officer in Charge " and the "Medical Officer" as well as another more contemporary residence. There are also two former stable buildings located on the eastern ridge complexes of buildings.

Stretching westward from this group of buildings lies an area of lightly treed, open space. The cricket pitch (established in 1928), a series of playing fields (developed in 1938), a bowling green and clubhouse, (1960) and a 9-hole golf course are located in this area. This open space was pivotal to the planning of the hospital facility as it functioned to separate different categories of patient. Patients whose behaviour and chances of recovery were low were accommodated in the buildings on the western part of the site and those who were likely to be successfully rehabilitated lived in the eastern part of the site.

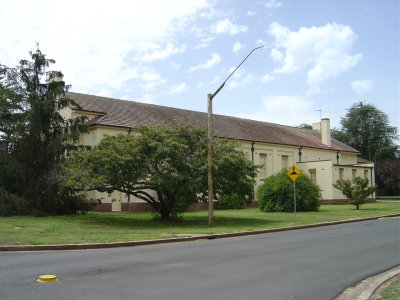
Recreation room

The group of buildings located in the area were constructed between 1927 and 1931. The wards and the Recreation Hall were built in an arc along the highest part of a ridgeline and take full advantage of the therapeutic views to the east over the playing fields and landscaped parklike gardens to the south east of the site. The Recreation Hall (now Leisure Centre) is located at the centre of the arc. Designed in the Inter-war Mediterranean style this building is of rendered stucco, has an arcaded veranda along one side, a flat end facade with a bell niche on the western end of the building.

There and there are five male wards to the north and five female wards to the south of the Recreation Hall. The two single storey brick wards either side of the Recreation Hall were for the sick and infirm. The building on the southern side of the recreation Hall retains its original eastern elevation featuring a veranda on three sides overlooking a central garden area. To the north and south of these sick and infirm wards lie mirror image, two storey wards constructed of brick and designed in the Federation Art and Craft style. The northern and southernmost wards in this configuration are constructed of Lithgow brick and are of a low key Arts and Craft style with wide east facing verandas supported on brick piers. All these building were designed to minimise the impression of being institutional buildings.

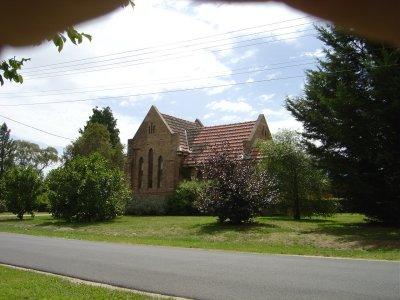
Mortuary chapel

Behind the arc of wards, across Canobolas Drive in its original layout, are located administration, service and support buildings including a mortuary chapel, operating theatre and epileptic wards. Directly behind the Recreation Hall is the Administration building and behind that the former Dining Room. These building form the east west axis of this end of the site.

The hospital buildings in both parts of the site are set in extensive landscaped, park like gardens. Each ward on the western part of the site has remnant formal ward gardens and hedges are used to define boundaries and spaces. Moving away from the wards the gardens give way to park like plantings of trees (such as the Monterey pine (Pinus radiata), elm (Ulmus procera), pin oaks (Quercus palustris) and poplars (Populus sp.)) and remnant original woodlands vegetation (single apple box, snow gum (Eucalyptus pauciflora) trees).

The original layout of the site included a substantial nursery and vegetable garden in the western part of the site along Forest Road. This original garden has been transferred its current site located between the entry gates and the former northernmost men's ward. In 1928 there were also a small dairy and piggery established at the hospital.

=== Condition ===
As at 3 March 2005, Bloomfield Hospital retained the integrity of its original layout and underpinning design philosophy as a therapeutic environment for the treatment of the mentally ill. Its original layout, separating different categories of patients over the eastern and western portions of the site as well as within the hierarchy of wards on each site is still clearly evident in as there has been very little new development on the site since the original construction period between 1923 and 1931.

The Bloomfield Hospital retained most of its original buildings and significant layout elements. While some of the formal ward gardens are no longer intact the plantings of many of the trees and shrubs throughout the site remain retaining the park-like quality of the grounds.

=== Modifications and dates ===
The Following modifications have been made to the site:

- 1952 – small brick extension to the Female sick and infirm ward
- 1958 – new kitchen block to the south of the original kitchen block
- 1956 – Bowling green to the southern end of Pringle Park
- 1960 – Bloomfield bowling green clubhouse built
- Early 1960s – remodeling of male and female ward block on the western part of the site
- 1969 – Central Western Area Laundry complex established in the south west of the grounds
- 1970s – fire escapes added to all two storey buildings
- 1965–68 – 9-hole golf course developed on the site- below Pringle Park (the playing field below the make wards in the western part of the site)
- 1989 – 4 x 16 bed treatment single storey units established in the western part of the site
- 2004 – 3 new units were established - a new Admissions Unit inside the Main Gate on the northwest side of the Crescent, a Short Stay Unit on the south west side of the Crescent near the Chapel

== Heritage listing ==
As at 3 March 2005, the Bloomfield Hospital is of State heritage significance. It has high historic, associative and aesthetic significance as an example of a mental hospital designed according to the philosophy and treatment regimens of the late Nineteenth and early Twentieth Century. It was the last of the large purpose built mental hospitals in NSW and one of only three built in rural areas. It has remained largely intact with regard to its original intention and layout as little development of the site has occurred since the completion of the original hospital buildings.

The hospital has a strong association with Manning and Eric Sinclair who were pioneers in the treatment and management of mental health in NSW in the late Nineteenth and early Twentieth Centuries. It is an ensemble of buildings in a village-like landscape setting and demonstrates through its physical fabric, layout and park-like setting, a humane method for the treatment of the mentally ill that is no longer carried out on such a large scale.

Its continual use as a place of treatment for the mentally ill also makes the place significant as does its tradition of promoting a close association with the local community through social, cultural and sporting activities.

Bloomfield Hospital was listed on the New South Wales State Heritage Register on 10 March 2006 having satisfied the following criteria.

The place is important in demonstrating the course, or pattern, of cultural or natural history in New South Wales.

Bloomfield Hospital is of historic significance to the development of NSW as it was one of only three dedicated mental hospitals built in rural NSW. It has been continuously used as a mental hospital and its design demonstrates the evolution of mental health treatment overtime. Its design and setting clearly demonstrate the "enlightened" Nineteenth and early Twentieth Century theories on the treatment of the mentally ill.

The place has a strong or special association with a person, or group of persons, of importance of cultural or natural history of New South Wales's history.

Bloomfield Hospital is strongly associated with Manning, Director General for the Insane (1876 to 1898) who proposed the construction of the hospital in Orange during his incumbency. Manning was a champion of a more compassionate and enlightened treatment of the mentally ill. The detailed design and construction of the hospital was undertaken by Eric Sinclair another significant figure in the humanisation of treatment of the mentally ill and in pioneering new treatments. The initial sit layout was developed by Walter Liberty Vernon and followed through by his successors in the role of Government Architect.

The place is important in demonstrating aesthetic characteristics and/or a high degree of creative or technical achievement in New South Wales.

Bloomfield Hospital in its landscape setting is of aesthetic significance as for its landmark qualities within the Orange area. These qualities derive from its distinctive tree cover, its ensemble of buildings, gardens and landscape features. The domestic scale of the buildings and their village like layout in the park like setting are an outstanding and intact example of a hospital specifically designed to promote recovery and rehabilitation of the mentally ill. Bloomfield was the last of a series of dedicated mental hospitals designed along these lines in the Nineteenth and Twentieth Centuries and retains nobal aesthetic values.

The place has a strong or special association with a particular community or cultural group in New South Wales for social, cultural or spiritual reasons.

Bloomfield Hospital has a strong association with past and present patients and staff many of whom came from all over NSW. Bloomfield has been home to many of these people who spent extended periods of their life there.

The place has potential to yield information that will contribute to an understanding of the cultural or natural history of New South Wales.

The built form, layout, landscape setting of Bloomfield Hospital provides evidence of and insight into the evolution of mental health treatment and underpinning theories from the late Nineteenth Century to the present day. Its research value is heightened by the level of integrity and intactness of its original form and layout.

The place possesses uncommon, rare or endangered aspects of the cultural or natural history of New South Wales.

Bloomfield Hospital is the last of a series of major, purpose-built mental hospitals set in a park like setting. It continues to be used as a mental health facility and so provides a rare "living" demonstration of the changes to the treatment of the mentally ill from the Nineteenth Century to the present.

It is likely that Bloomfield's operating theatre was a unique addition to mental hospital. Its construction coincided with the pioneering years of psycho surgery in NSW and Australia. It is also likely that the inclusion in the hospital complex of purpose built TB wards for mentally ill patients was also uncommon.

The place is important in demonstrating the principal characteristics of a class of cultural or natural places/environments in New South Wales.

Bloomfield Hospital, its built form, layout and setting, provides an example of the principal characteristics of an early Twentieth Century mental hospital designed as a holistic therapeutic environment.

== See also ==
- List of hospitals in Australia
- List of psychiatric hospitals in Australia
