= Norah Head Lightstation Precinct =

Lighthouse in New South Wales, Australia

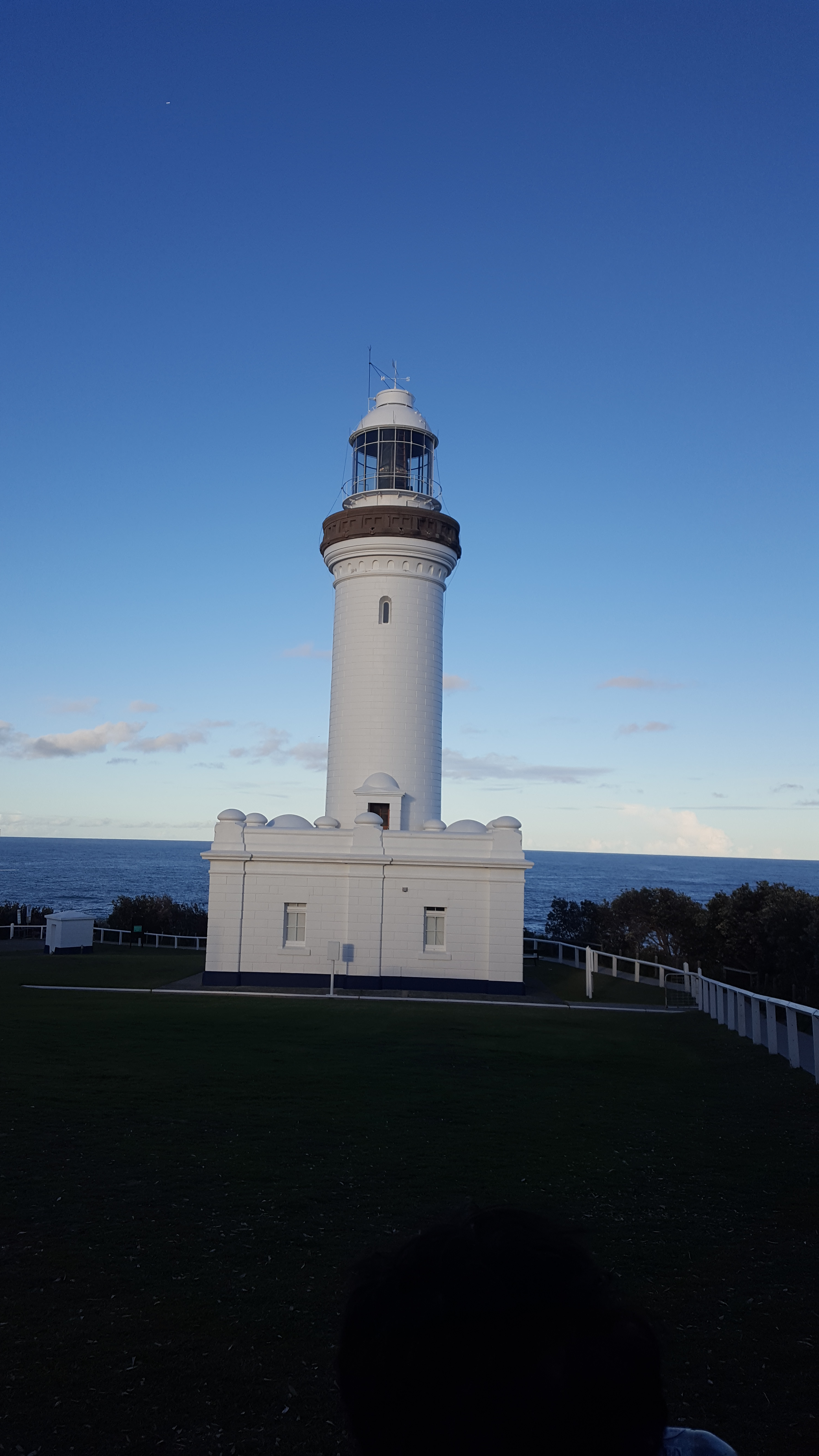
- The Norah Head Lightstation and Precinct, pictured in 2024.

- Location within New South Wales Location within Australia
- 33°16′57″S 151°34′27″E
- Location: Bush Street, Norah Head, Central Coast, New South Wales, Australia

History
- Built: 1903

Site notes
- Architect: Cecil W. Darley

New South Wales Heritage Register
- Official name: Norah Head Lightstation Precinct
- Type: State heritage (landscape)
- Designated: 13 April 2007
- Reference no.: 1753
- Type: Other - Landscape - Cultural
- Category: Landscape - Cultural

Norah Head Lightstation Precinct is a heritage-listed former lighthouse precinct located at Bush Street, Norah Head in the Central Coast local government area of New South Wales, Australia. The Norah Head lighthouse and associated buildings were designed by Cecil W. Darley and built in 1903. The precinct was added to the New South Wales State Heritage Register on 13 April 2007.

== History ==
In the early years of European settlement all ships were bound for Port Jackson but little effort was made to guide them safely into port. In January 1793 a light was used for the first time near the signal station on South Head to guide a ship, the Bellona into the harbour. A flare was maintained until the first lighthouse (Macquarie Lighthouse) was commissioned on South Head in 1818.

Lighthouses followed settlement and lights were erected at Iron Pot at the entrance to the Derwent River in 1832, at Cape Bruny in 1836 and at Shortland's Bluff (Queenscliffe) in 1842.

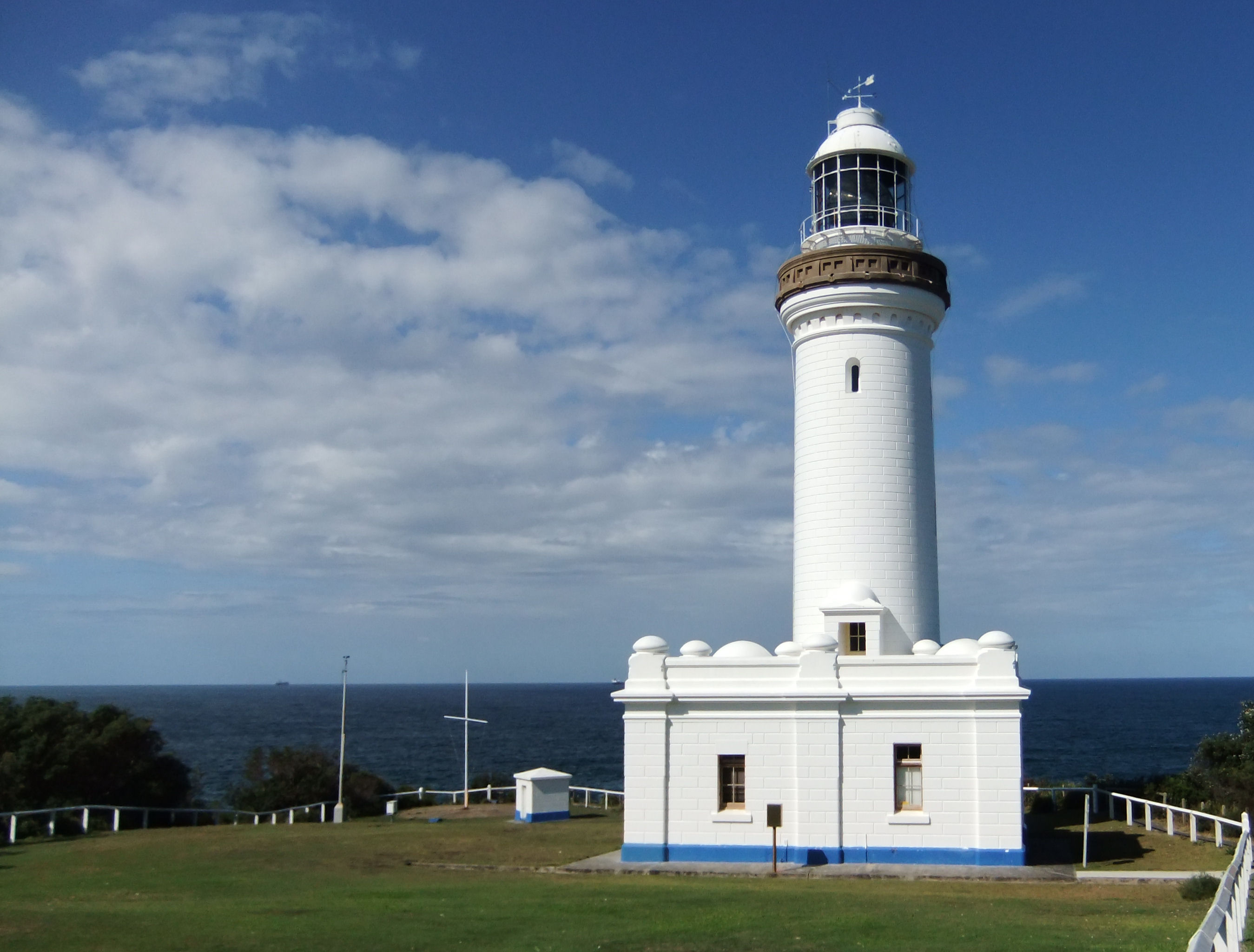
The Norah Head Lightstation and Precinct, pictured in 2011

The development of the lighthouse system was for the most part a 19th-century phenomenon, as a result of a series of inter-related improvements in optical systems, and the development and introduction of oil and electric illuminants. The partial lighting of the Australian coasts and the granting of self-government to New South Wales, Victoria, Tasmania and South Australia in 1855–56 led to moves to achieve stronger inter-colonial co-operation. Sir William Denison, the Governor of New South Wales suggested in 1856 that an intercolonial board be appointed to erect and maintain lighthouses. The board was formed, and met in Melbourne in 1856, but it was decided that the task was "hopeless".

This first serious attempt by the Australian colonies to achieve a national approach to maritime safety by means of lighthouses had failed. None of the colonies was prepared to change its existing arrangements for the common good. This was to remain the situation until the Federation of colonies in 1901 when the Commonwealth government assumed responsibility for shipping and navigational devices.

The Adelaide constitutional convention of 1897 confirmed the previously debated arrangements that federal legislation was to deal with the construction, maintenance and management of lighthouses, lightships, lightsirens, beacons, buoys and signs for shipping throughout the Commonwealth and over its adjacent seas. It was also to impose and collect dues to be paid by owners or masters of ships which derived benefits from the lights or other navigational devices.

Lack of finance prevented the Commonwealth government from taking action for some years after Federation. At the same time, the states were not willing to commit funds to construct lighthouses which they knew the Commonwealth would take over sooner or later. New South Wales completed the lighthouse at Norah Head in 1903, Western Australia erected on Cape Naturaliste in 1903-4 and Tasmania built one on Tasman Island in 1906, but the states were otherwise inactive as they awaited developments on the part of the Federal government.

The Commonwealth Lighthouse Service was set up in 1913. On 1 July 1915 the Commonwealth officially accepted responsibility for 104 staffed lightstations, 18 automatic lights, one light buoy, 16 unlit buoys, and forty unlit beacons and obelisks.

=== New South Wales ===
Australia's first lighthouse, designed by Francis Greenway, was erected in 1818 at South Head under the direction of Governor Macquarie and the lighthouse was named in his honour. For forty years, it remained the only lighthouse on the coast of present-day NSW. By the 1850s, the colonial economy had been boosted by the discovery of gold, and the population of NSW doubled between 1851 and 1860. A period of lighthouse building spanning almost 50 years followed, beginning in 1858 with the construction of the Hornby Light on Sydney's Inner South Head. After 1862, with the appointment of Frances Hixson, NSW embarked upon an ambitious program of lighthouse building erecting some 17 major lights prior to the establishment of the Commonwealth Lighthouse Service in 1915. This saw a lighthouse on average every 54.4 kilometres (33.8 mi) along the NSW coast, the highest density in Australia.

Because of a combination of factors including the fact that James Barnet was the Colonial Architect for most of this time (1862–1890), the 1890s economic depression, and Federation in 1901, most of the NSW lighthouses were designed by Barnet. The lightstations built after 1890 are therefore comparatively rare, only the major lights being established between that date and the take over by the Commonwealth in 1915; these lights are Point Perpendicular (1899), Smoky Cape (1891), Cape Byron (1901) and Norah Head (1903).

The construction of Point Perpendicular lighthouse in 1897 brought a significant change to lighthouse construction in the colony. In an effort to reduce the cost of building in remote areas, a standard design was developed using precast concrete blocks and local aggregates. After the completion of Point Perpendicular lighthouse, similar structures were erected at Cape Byron in and at Norah Head.

=== Norah Head ===
Mariners were calling for the erection of a lighthouse on "Bungaree Noragh Point" (Norah Head) as early as 1861. Ten wrecks occurred in the area of Norah Head over the years 1894 to 1903, one of the most tragic being the steamer, Gwydir, in 1894, in which three lives were lost. Edward Hammond Hargraves (1816–1891), gold rush publicist, was influential in pressing for the construction of a lightstation. From his nearby residence at Norahville, he had become aware of the growing number of wrecks occurring in the vicinity. Regular agitation by mariners and the public over many years, was unproductive.

One of the last acts, however of the Newcastle Marine Board, prior to its abolition, was to recommend the construction of a lighthouse at Norah Head. Responsibility for lighthouses then passed to the Public Works Department. As a result of the 1887 Board of Inquiry into the Civil Service, the design of lighthouses was partly transferred from the Colonial Architects Office to the Harbours and Rivers Navigation Branch. The plans for Norah Head were initialled by Charles Assinder Harding and signed by Cecil Darley, Engineer in Chief for Public Works. James Barnet claimed responsibility for the design of this lighthouse and for similar structures previously built at Point Perpendicular and Byron Bay, his influence can be seen in the design.

Construction of the lighthouse began in 1901, and was undertaken by day labour. Materials for the lighthouse were brought by boat into Cabbage Tree Harbour and unloaded onto a wharf which had been constructed for this purpose. The lighthouse was completed in 1903. It follows in all essentials the precast block construction method using local aggregates which was first introduced at Point Perpendicular in 1899. It was the last staffed lighthouse constructed in NSW.

Also constructed 1902/3 were: a lightkeepers cottage with garden (concrete blocks with terracotta tiles of the Marseilles pattern on the roof); a small building for a fuel store, workshop and paint store and earth closet (concrete blocks with terracotta tiles of the Marseilles pattern on the roof); Assistant Keeper's duplex (eastern and western quarters) built of concrete blocks with terracotta tiles of the Marseilles pattern on the roof; a signal house constructed as a flag house for the flagstaff (constructed of precast concrete blocks painted, cemented inside, with roof of concrete); a timber flagstaff; a stables constructed of concrete blocks with terracotta tiles of the Marseilles pattern for the roof; and two small fuel stores (earth closet and sink) constructed of concrete blocks, with roofs of terracotta tiles of the Marseilles pattern.

The Norah Headquarters are almost identical in design to those at Cape Byron constructed two years earlier, but significantly different from those at Point Perpendicular. The buildings contain the elaborate stormwater and sullage systems typical of the work of Barnet and Harding.

A lantern, of the type used on the New South Wales coast by Barnet, was fitted with a kerosene burning first order dioptric revolving light system manufactured by the Birmingham firm of Chance Bros. Chance Brothers and Co., Limited, Lighthouse Engineers and Constructors, of Smethwick, Birmingham, England were by the beginning of the 20th century the sole lighthouse manufacturers. The focal plane of the light was 46 metres (151 ft) above high water mark and visibility horizon was 29 kilometres (18 mi).

The light was first exhibited on 15 November 1903. The original light was on 438,000 candle power. The cost of the optical apparatus in 1901 was A£5,000. On 13 April 1923, the concentric wick burner inside the lens was replaced by a Ford-Schmidt kerosene burner and the light power was increased to 700,000 candle power. In 1960 the stables were converted to a garage. On 28 March 1961 the light was converted to electric operation and the power was increased to 1,000,000 candelas. At the same time the staffing of the light was reduced from three lightkeepers to two.

The Lightstation has been a popular tourist attraction since it began operating. In April 1993, Norah Head was one of only 18 staffed lightstations in Australia administered by the Australian Maritime Safety Authority (AMSA). The lighthouse was automated and destaffed in 1994. The lighthouse reserve was handed over in 1997 to NSW Department of Land and Water Conservation. The site is now managed by the Norah Head Lighthouse Trust and used as a tourist destination, for holiday accommodation as a mix of day- and longer-term accommodation uses.

== Description ==
This lighthouse group, designed and constructed under the direction of C. W. Darley, Engineer-in-Chief for Public Works, and completed in 1903 follows in all essentials the precast block construction method using local aggregates which was first introduced at Point Perpendicular in 1899. Its splendid lantern of the type made famous on the New South Wales coast by Colonial Architect James Barnet, was fitted with a kerosene burning first order dioptric revolving light system manufactured by the Birmingham firm of Chance Bros. Focal plane of the light is 46 metres (151 ft) above highwater mark and visibility horizon is 29 kilometres (18 mi). While Norah Head lighthouse demonstrated the principal design features of the Barnet style colonial architecture, it had to have a 27-metre (89 ft) tower because of its location on the low headland north of Tuggerah Lake entrance and its lantern was three times as powerful as that at Byron Bay which was opened only two years previously. Residences and minor buildings adjoin the tower site and are of the standard type. Roofs, originally corrugated iron are now tiled.

James Barnet claimed responsibility for the design of this lighthouse and for similar structures previously built at Point Perpendicular and Byron Bay, his influence can be seen in the design. Construction of the lighthouse began in 1901, and was undertaken by day labour. Materials for the lighthouse were brought by boat into Cabbage Tree Harbour and unloaded onto a wharf which had been constructed for this purpose. The lighthouse was completed in 1903. It follows in all essentials the precast block construction method using local aggregates which was first introduced at Point Perpendicular in 1899. It was the last staffed lighthouse constructed in NSW.

Also constructed 1902/3 were: a lightkeeper's cottage with garden (concrete blocks with terracotta tiles of the Marseilles pattern on the roof); a small building for a fuel store, workshop and paint store and earth closet (concrete blocks with terracotta tiles of the Marseilles pattern on the roof); Assistant Keeper's duplex (eastern and western quarters) built of concrete blocks with terracotta tiles of the Marseilles pattern on the roof; a signal house constructed as a flag house for the flagstaff (constructed of precast concrete blocks painted, cemented inside, with roof of concrete); a timber flagstaff; a stables constructed of concrete blocks with terracotta tiles of the Marseilles pattern for the roof; and two small fuel stores (earth closet and sink) constructed of concrete blocks, with roofs of terracotta tiles of the Marseilles pattern.

The Norah Headquarters are almost identical in design to those at Cape Byron constructed two years earlier, but significantly different from those at Point Perpendicular. The buildings contain the elaborate stormwater and sullage systems typical of the work of Barnet and Harding.

A lantern, of the type used on the New South Wales coast by Barnet, was fitted with a kerosene burning first order dioptric revolving light system manufactured by the Birmingham firm of Chance Bros. The focal plane of the light was 46 metres (151 ft) above high water mark and visibility horizon was 29 kilometres (18 mi).

The light was first exhibited on 15 November 1903. The original light was on 438,000 candle power. The cost of the optical apparatus in 1901 was A£5,000. On 13 April 1923, the concentric wick burner inside the lens was replaced by a Ford-Schmidt kerosene burner and the light power was increased to 700,000 candle power. In 1960 the stables were converted to a garage. On 28 March 1961 the light was converted to electric operation and the power was increased to 1,000,000 candelas. At the same time the staffing of the light was reduced from three lightkeepers to two.

The Lightstation complex consists of the signal house; lighthouse tower and base; workshop; head keeper's quarters and associated fuel shed, WC, workshop and paint store; assistant keeper's quarters duplex and associated fuel stores; and stables. All the buildings are constructed of large precast concrete blocks made on site. The lighthouse and the signal house are cement rendered and have "false" ashlar block lines inscribed to the exterior. The living quarters and stables have remained unpainted since construction.

The lighthouse is a 27.5-metre (90 ft) tower with surrounding orthogonal base constructed of precast concrete block using a local aggregate and rendered walls and plinth with deep ashlar coursing. The parapet and entry foyers of the base structure are adorned in solid trachyte block. The lantern room is of metal and glass construction and sits atop this gallery, and has a decorative iron catwalk encircling the glass to allow for cleaning. Fenestration is simple, with windows to the work rooms being four-pane fixed timber lower sash, with the upper sash, with the upper sash a 2 pane hopper. Windows to the tower are of a porthole style brass framed and of vertical proportions with an arched head.

The interior of the lighthouse is simple in form. The main entry door is made of cedar set with sidelights and fanlight, and leads into a foyer of tessellated tiles. The foyer still has the original desk for the visitor's book. There are two storerooms at ground-floor level. The tower contains a concrete spiral staircase with slate treads and cast-iron-and-brass balustrade. The lamp gallery has a painted cast-iron floor grate with a cast-iron stair leading to the outdoor gallery. The lamp itself is encircled and protected by perspex and aluminium panels.

The lighthouse tower contains the original Chance Bros. 3,700-millimetre-diameter (150 in) cast-iron-and-copper-lantern house. This consists of segmental cast-iron murette, cast-iron-framed copper-clad dome, precast internal and external catwalks, Trinity (drum) vent, etc. A good example of industrial technology from the early 20th century. There are approximately 21 other 3,700-millimetre-diameter (150 in) lanterns known to exist in Australia.

The lighthouse tower contains its revolving mercury float bearing pedestal still operational, together with parts of the original drive shaft. The tower retains its original 700 millimetres (28 in) focal length two panel catadioptric flashing optic. Likely to be rare due to its configuration in two large panels. The small signal house is constructed to match the lighthouse, in concrete block with rendered walls and plinth with deep ashlar coursing. The roof is solid concrete in a shallow hipped form, notably missing the concrete dome proposed in the original drawings.

The keeper's cottage is a large residence (1902–03) built in concrete blocks which are unpainted. An open verandah surrounds the northeast, southeast and south west sides. All verandah posts are of cast iron in a turned timber form, with curved timber verandah beams. The hipped roof is clad with terracotta tiles and one chimney remains. Several outbuildings are extant in the north corner of the yard being the former fuel shed, the WC, the workshop and paint store. There is an eastern and western assistant keeper's quarters, a duplex built at the time of the keeper's cottage. The building is constructed of the same precast concrete blocks, unpainted. A number of changes occurred c. 1970 including the replacement of the roofing with concrete tiles, chimneys have been demolished. Two small fuels stores are located near the assistant keepers quarters, constructed as fuel stores, with earth closet and sink. They are of concrete block construction with terracotta tiles roofs in the marseilles pattern. The former stables building, which was converted to a garage, is a simple rectangular concrete block building in c. 1960 the terracotta tiled roof was replaced with concrete tiles. The east face has three timber doors to the former stable, tack and carriage rooms.

Remnants of the flagstaff, removed at an unknown date, include the concrete and steel base, the concrete apron for the flagstaff, and four concrete and iron anchor points for the flagstaff. There are a number of original concrete pavings. These take the form of concrete aprons, paving and a step. In common with most other lightstations of the period, elaborate water retention systems were provided at Norah Head. Remnants of this are sumps, cistern and well heads, and a base for a water pump.

Some of the roads and tracks at the lightstation appear to be of some age. These may take the form of original or early routes with later paving, evidenced by roads and tracks leading to local geographic features that have probably been used for some time. Much of the original and early fencing and gates survive and are either post and rail, paling, picket fence, or gates. A quarry (located to the south west of the former stables) is believed to have been the source of gravel for the aggregate in the construction of the lighthouse and other buildings. The immediate landscape of the buildings is mostly flat, grasses areas with a few coastal shrubs. Around the residences are more formal grounds with banksia, acacia, Norfolk Island pines and New Zealand Christmas Bush. The present land formation coincides closely with the original site works plans. This landform is a low headland above extensive flat rock shelves near sea level and contrasts with the well built lighthouse and quarters to produce a scene of visual appeal.

Norah Head consists of a small headland of low eucalypt woodland and banksia heath that is substantially contiguous with more extensive natural vegetation to the west on the edge of Tuggerah Lakes. The low woodland with heathland on hard-setting sand at Norah Head is regarded as an endangered ecologically community. The open tree cover consists primarily of red bloodwood (Corymbia gummifera), broad-leaved paperbark (Melaleuca quinqenervia) and Camfield's gum (Eucalyptus camfieldii). Beneath the tree cover is a dense cover of shrubs, grasses and graminoids including red bottlebrush (Calliestemon citrinus), the banksia (Banksia oblongfolia), Sydney golden wattle (Acacia longifolia), she-oak (Allocasuarina distyla), Mirbelia rubiifolia and slender rice-flower (Pimelea linifolia). Forty nine species of fauna have been recorded on or near the headland, including five marine mammals, the southern right whale (Eubalaena australis), the hump-backed whale (Megaptera novaeangliae), the New Zealand fur-seal (Arctophoca forsteri), and the common dolphin (Delphinus delphis). Other species present include one frog, the eastern banjo frog (Limnodynastes ornatus), the common ringtail possum (Pseudocheirus peregrinus) and thirty five bird species including the striped honeyeater (Plectorhyncha laneolata), and spangled drongo (Dicrurus bracteatus).

=== Comparative analysis ===
Nineteen lighthouses in NSW are included in the now defunct Register of the National Estate. The lighthouse at Point Perpendicular, was the first to be constructed using precast concrete blocks. The precast block construction was subsequently used at Cape Byron (1901) and Norah Head (1903). The Cape Byron complex consists of a lighthouse tower with store rooms at base, a head keeper's cottage, and an assistant keepers duplex. Sugarloaf Point was the first major lighthouse designed by Barnet.

=== Condition ===
As at 24 January 2006, it is considered intact and in good condition.

The lightstation has intrinsic integrity, in that most external and internal items of the lighthouse, keepers' cottages and associated structures are largely intact, enabling ready understanding and interpretation of how the facility has been operated since its establishment.

=== Modifications and dates ===
On 13 April 1923, the concentric wick burner inside the lens was replaced by a Ford-Schmidt kerosene burner and the light power was increased to 700,000 candle power. On 28 March 1961 the light was converted to electric operation and the power was increased to 1,000,000 candelas. A number of changes occurred c. 1970 including the replacement of the roofing with concrete tiles, chimneys have been demolished. A number of changes occurred c. 1970 including the replacement of the roofing with concrete tiles, chimneys have been demolished. The former stables building, which was converted to a garage, is a simple rectangular concrete block building; in c. 1960 the terracotta tiled roof was replaced with concrete tiles.

== Heritage listing ==
As at 10 April 2006, Norah Head is the third lighthouse of a type that developed from an exercise in standardisation to reduce the cost of building in remote areas. All three buildings remain in good condition today. The architectural profiles and details are pleasing and installed optical mechanisms, while historically unique, continue to serve after conversion to electric power operation. The place is significant for its spiritual and cultural association with the Darkinjung people. The place was used by the Darkinjung people as a camp site, burial place and all stages of the rites of passage from childhood to adulthood have occurred there since ancestral times. Sites include a burial, a dreaming site, middens, campsites, engravings and a scarred tree.

Norah Head is of national cultural significance because it was the last colonial built lighthouse on the central NSW coast and as such marked the completion of a chain of lighthouses along the NSW coast which was necessary to keep the maritime track open. The importance of maritime safety to Australia's commercial and national development was a recurring national theme and reinforced by the creation of the Commonwealth Lighthouse Service in 1913.

The lighthouse is associated with the work of James Barnet and the NSW Colonial Architect's Office in that he adopted the style of Greenway's original Macquarie lighthouse and made it the basis of the NSW style until 1903 when Norah Head lighthouse was the last of that style constructed.

Norah Head Lightstation, completed 1903, is of historic significance being the last colonial built lightstation on the NSW coast, completing a major program of lighthouse construction. Norah Head Lightstation is significant as having been the last staffed lightstation constructed, having been staffed for over 90 years, and as one of the last lightstations to be de staffed. The Lightstation is significant as an important element in the establishment of navigational aids along the NSW coast. Norah Head Lightstation is significant as a relatively intact complex of buildings constructed of precast concrete block. The lighthouse is one of only three precast concrete block lighthouses in Australia. The Lighthouse tower contains one of approximately 21 known Chance Bros. 3700mm lantern houses in Australia with original wind direction mechanism and a possibly rare Chance Bros. 2 panel, 700mm catadioptric flashing optic. The Norah Head Lightstation is significant for its association with a number of important people. Edward Hargraves, gold rush publicist, advocated the need for the establishment of a lighthouse at Norah Head. The Lightstation is significant for its association with Charles Assinder Harding, being one of three such lighthouse complexes designed by Harding. The Lightstation is also associated with the work of James Barnet, the design of the buildings being influenced by those designed by Barnet during his period as Colonial Architect The Lightstation complex is of aesthetic significance. The headland location contrasts with the substantial lighthouse tower and buildings. The eclectic design and size of the lighthouse tower serves as a landmark and contributes to the aesthetic appeal of the place. The Norah Head Lightstation is of social significance to the community, mariners and tourists. Its long occupation, the scale of original construction, its near original condition, its aesthetic appeal and its ongoing public visitation contribute to the high regard it is held in by the community.

Norah Head includes a significant proportion of the state-listed endangered ecological community known as "low woodland with heathland in indurated (hard-setting) sand". This community is restricted to the local area around Norah Head. The community includes the Commonwealth and state-listed vulnerable species Camfield's gum (Eucalyptus camfieldii). A number of significant fauna species have been recorded in the area around the headland. Four species listed as vulnerable under state legislation have been recorded around the headland. These are the squirrel glider (Petaurus norfolcensis), white tern (Gygis alba), sanderling (Calidris alba) and providence petrel (Pterodroma solandri). Two other species, the southern right whale (Eubalaena australis) and hump-backed whale (Megaptera novaeangliae) are listed as vulnerable at both state and Commonwealth level. At least four migratory bird species listed under the international JAMBA/CAMBA agreements have been recorded from the area including the sanderling (Calidris alba), curlew sandpiper (Calidris ferruginea), red-necked stint (Calidris ruficollis), and grey-tailed tattler (Heteroscelus brevipes).

Norah Head Lightstation Precinct was listed on the New South Wales State Heritage Register on 13 April 2007 having satisfied the following criteria.

The place is important in demonstrating the course, or pattern, of cultural or natural history in New South Wales.

The lighthouse is significant as it is the last major one within a period of lighthouse construction along the coast of New South Wales from 1858 to 1904. The next major lighthouse was Wollongong Head lighthouse, not erected until 1937 by the Commonwealth, which had officially taken over control of lighthouses from the States on 1 July 1915.

The place has a strong or special association with a person, or group of persons, of importance of cultural or natural history of New South Wales's history.

The place is significant for its spiritual and cultural association with the Darkinjung people. The place was used by the Darkinjung people as a camp site, burial place and all stages of the rites of passage from childhood to adulthood have occurred there since ancestral times. Sites include a burial, mythological site, middens, campsites, engravings and a scarred tree. The lighthouse is significant as the last major lighthouse constructed on the NSW coast within a period of lighthouse construction along the NSW coast from 1858 to 1904. The lightstation is significant for its association with the architect Charles Assinder Harding and the engineer Cecil W. Darley. In December 1890, Harding accepted appointment as architect to the Harbours and Rivers branch of the Public Works Department under Cecil W. Darley, the engineer-in-chief. Harding "held this position until 1904, having charge of designing and erection of numerous important buildings, among which were four new lighthouses". The lightstation is a late contributor to the 1870s vision of NSW Marine Board President, Francis Hixson, who wanted the coast "Illuminated like a street with lamps". (Reid, G. 1988, p76). Norah Head lightstation served to supplement navigational aids on the NSW and Australian coastline, operated by keepers from as early as 1818 through recent times when lighthouses were de-manned. Norah Head had a history of shipwrecks and associated loss of life. The lighthouse provides an important navigational aid to operators of ocean craft in the vicinity of Norah Head. The lighthouse keepers' cottages are associated with the occupation of the site and manning of the lighthouse from 1903 up to the time the lighthouse became fully automated.

The place is important in demonstrating aesthetic characteristics and/or a high degree of creative or technical achievement in New South Wales.

The lighthouse and signal house are significant as a prominent landmark that stands in stark contrast to the surrounding headland environment. While Norah Head lighthouse demonstrated the principal design features of the Barnet style colonial architecture, it had to have a 27-metre (89 ft) tower because of its location on the low headland north of Tuggerah Lake entrance and its lantern was three times as powerful as that at Byron Bay which was opened only two years previously. The lighthouse is representative of the classical style and form that developed from Francis Greenway's South Head Lighthouse (1818) and was used by James Barnet at Sugarloaf Point (1875). Documentary evidence indicates that Norah Head Lightstation was designed by Charles Assinder Harding, who was also in charge of its erection. It is an example of the influence of the Barnet lighthouse style. The lighthouse is idiosyncratic in detail with its decorative domed entrance and pediments. Other major lighthouses attributed to Harding's design are Point Perpendicular Lighthouses (1899) and Cape Byron (1901). These lighthouses are comparatively similar in style and construction method to those of Norah Head and the three make a significant group. Design of the lesser Crookhaven Heads (1904) is also attributed to Harding as his fourth and last lighthouse.

The place has a strong or special association with a particular community or cultural group in New South Wales for social, cultural or spiritual reasons.

The place is significant to the contemporary community of mariners, tourists, and to the Central Coast community. The Darkinjung people regard the cultural sites for which they have knowledge with sufficient reverence to place a native title claim and believe in maintaining the cultural and spiritual links for posterity. Most external and internal items of the lighthouse, keepers' cottages and associated structures are largely intact, enabling ready understanding/ interpretation of how the facility has been operated since its establishment and of the keepers' lifestyle.

The place has potential to yield information that will contribute to an understanding of the cultural or natural history of New South Wales.

The place is associated with a distinctive phase of lighthouse construction, using precast concrete block design, a new construction technique of the time. The tower construction, in particular the lantern balcony is significant for its use of trachyte obtained and pre-worked off site in a stone quarry at Bowral. The ground, first, second and third floor interior of the lighthouse tower are paved with quality black and white tiles in checkerboard patterns. The original lens crystal and each phase in the evolution of the light has technical research potential. The place has aboriginal significance and includes rock shelters, platforms and midden/camp sites. The place has the potential to reveal archaeologically material of aboriginal significance. The immediate area around the lighthouse, flagstaff, weather sheds and the cliff faces has archaeological potential and significance. The place has ecological significance as a habitat for threatened species and as - an example of remnant littoral rainforest.

The place possesses uncommon, rare or endangered aspects of the cultural or natural history of New South Wales.

The Lighthouse retains its integrity despite changes in the light power source from kerosene to electricity. The lighthouse electric power is backed-up by a Lister diesel generator. The original 1902 Chance Bros lens is intact and rotates with minimal friction on bath of mercury. Cape Byron lighthouse has a similar mercury float. These are the last of this type in operation at NSW lighthouses. Most external and internal items of the lighthouse, keepers' cottages and associated structures are largely intact, enabling ready understanding/ interpretation of how the facility has been operated since its establishment and of the keepers' lifestyle, now a defunct way of life.

The place is important in demonstrating the principal characteristics of a class of cultural or natural places/environments in New South Wales.

Norah Head is representative of the larger NSW late 19th -early 20th century lightstations. The lighthouse, flag store, keepers' quarters and outbuildings remain in a near as-built condition.

The place was used by the Darkinjung people as a camp site, burial place and all stages of the rites of passage from childhood to adulthood have occurred there since ancestral times.

Documentary evidence indicates that Norah Head Lightstation was designed by Charles Assinder Harding and as such it is an example of the influence of the Barnet lighthouse style.

The residences also derive from the Barnet design in the construction and plan form. The lighthouse is representative of the classical style and form that developed from Francis Greenway's South Head Lighthouse (1818) and was used by James Barnet at Sugarloaf Point 1875.

== See also ==
- Norah Head Light
- List of lighthouses in Australia
