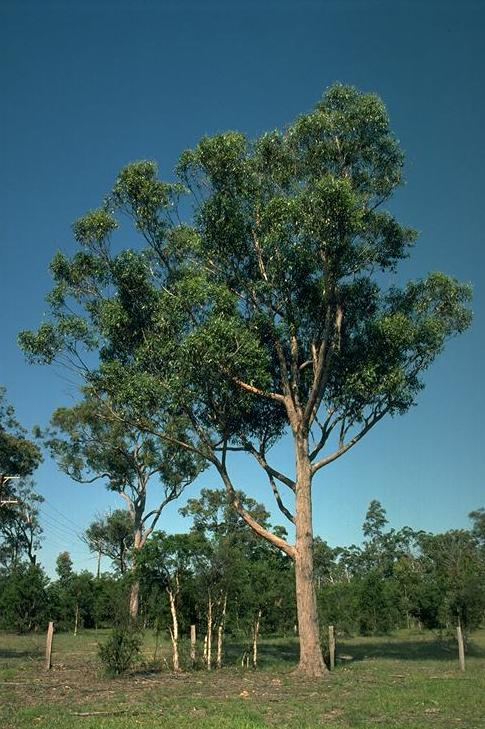
- Eucalyptus camfieldii near Wyong

Conservation status
- Vulnerable (IUCN 3.1)

Scientific classification
- Kingdom: Plantae
- Clade: Tracheophytes
- Clade: Angiosperms
- Clade: Eudicots
- Clade: Rosids
- Order: Myrtales
- Family: Myrtaceae
- Genus: Eucalyptus
- Species: E. camfieldii

Binomial name
- Eucalyptus camfieldii Maiden

= Eucalyptus camfieldii =

Camfield's stringybark

Species of eucalyptus

Eucalyptus camfieldii, commonly known as Camfield's stringybark or heart-leaved stringybark, is a species of mallee or small tree that is endemic to New South Wales. It has rough, fibrous and stringy bark, broadly lance-shaped adult leaves, flower buds in groups of about eleven, white flowers and flattened hemispherical fruit. It grows in poor, sandy soil in the Sydney region.

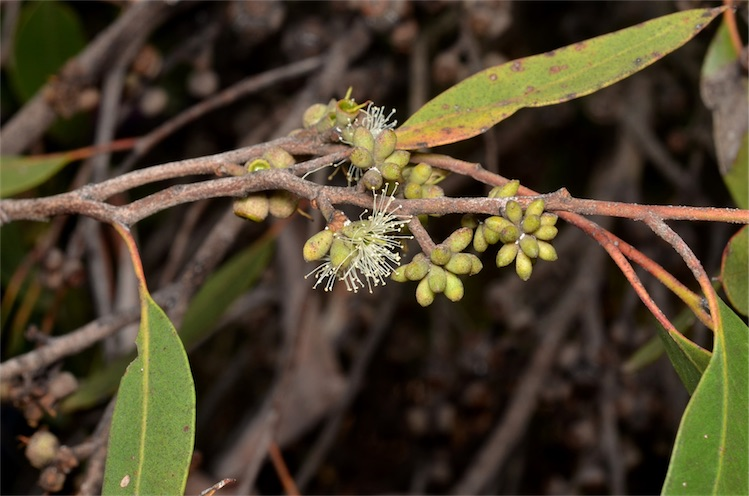
Flowers and buds

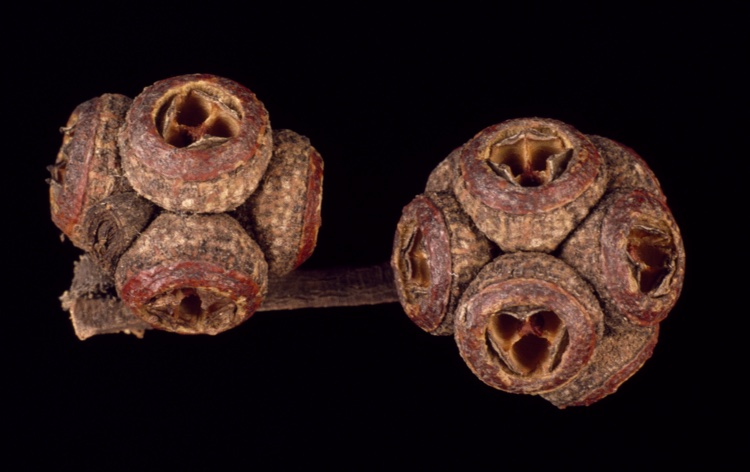
Fruit

== Description ==
Eucalyptus camfieldii is a usually a mallee that grows to a height of 4 m (13 ft) but sometimes a straggly tree to 10 metres (33 ft). It forms a lignotuber up to 20 m (66 ft) across with a number of stems. It has persistent, grey or brownish, stringy and fibrous bark. Young plants and coppice regrowth have heart-shaped to almost round leaves 25–42 mm (0.98–1.7 in) long and 23–35 mm (0.9–1 in) wide. Adult leaves are broadly lance-shaped, the same glossy green on both sides, 60–110 mm (2.4–4.3 in) long and 18–40 mm (0.7–2 in) wide on a petiole 10–25 mm (0.39–0.98 in) long. The flowers are borne in groups of between nine and fifteen in leaf axils on a flattened peduncle 5–10 mm (0.20–0.39 in) long but the individual buds are sessile. Mature buds are oval to oblong, 6–10 mm (0.24–0.39 in) long and 3–4 mm (0.1–0.2 in) wide with a conical operculum. Flowering mainly occurs from August to November and the flowers are white. The fruit are woody flattened hemispherical capsules crowded together, 4–5 mm (0.16–0.20 in) long and 7–9 mm (0.3–0.4 in) wide with the valves roughly level with the rim.

== Taxonomy and naming ==
Eucalyptus camfieldii was first formally described in 1920 by Joseph Maiden and the description was published in Journal and Proceedings of the Royal Society of New South Wales from a specimen collected near Middle Harbour. The specific epithet ( camfieldii) honours Julius Henry Camfield (1852–1916), who worked in the Royal Botanic Garden, Sydney from 1882 until 1916.

== Distribution and habitat ==
Camfield's stringybark is restricted to poor, shallow sandy soil on ridges and some headlands between the Norah Head and Waterfall in New South Wales.

== Conservation status ==
This eucalypt is classified as "vulnerable" under the Australian Government Environment Protection and Biodiversity Conservation Act 1999 and the New South Wales Government Biodiversity Conservation Act 2016. The main threats to the species are loss of habitat due to land clearing, inappropriate fire regimes and weed invasion.
