= Norah Head Light =

Lighthouse in New South Wales, Australia

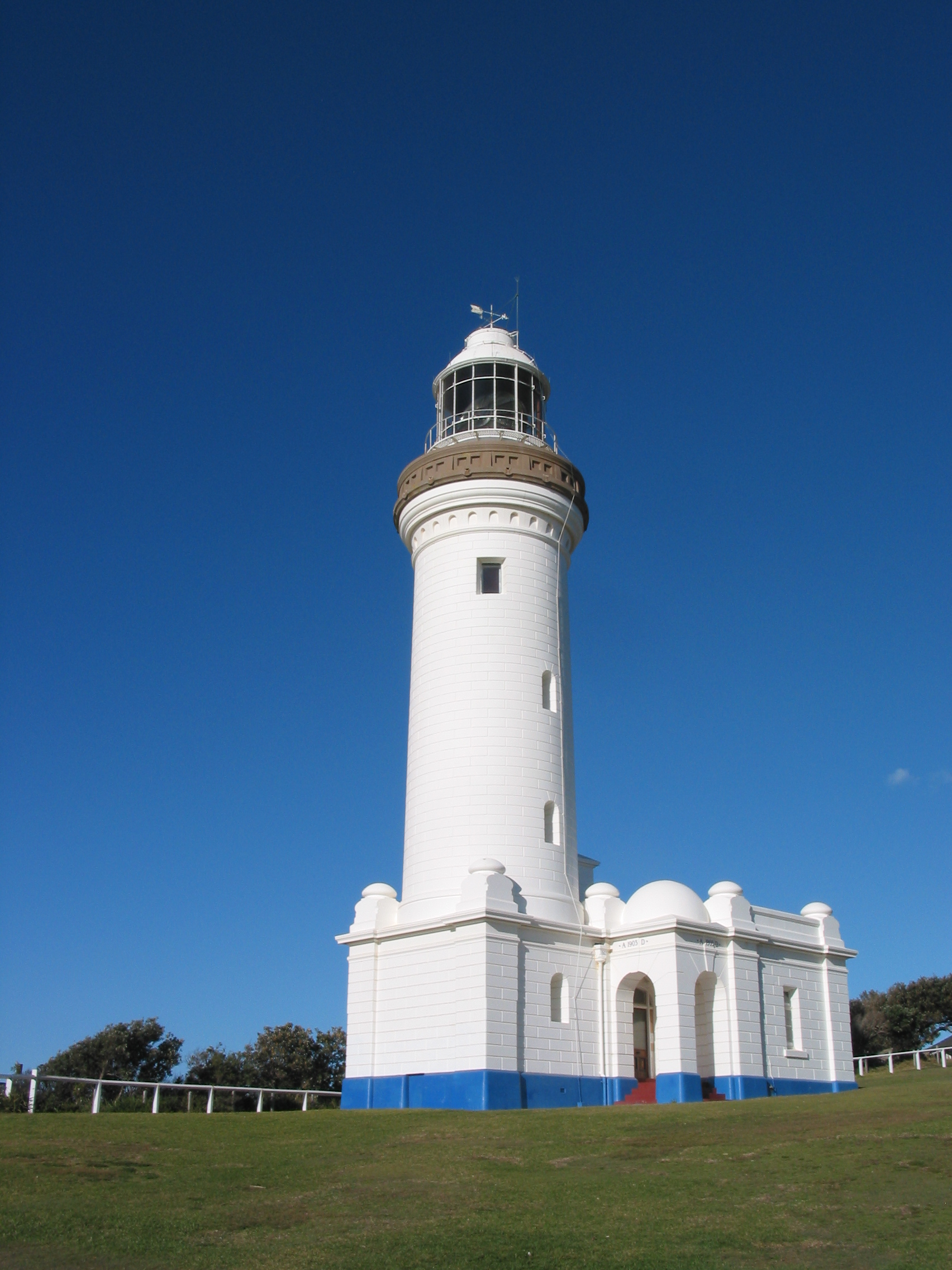
- Norah Head Light in 2009
- Location: Norah Head, New South Wales, Australia
- Coordinates: 33°16′54″S 151°34′35″E

Tower
- Constructed: 1903
- Construction: concrete block
- Height: 90 ft (27 m)
- Shape: cylindrical tower attached to 1-story keeper's house
- Markings: white
- Power source: mains electricity
- Operator: Australian Maritime Safety Authority

Light
- Focal height: 151 ft (46 m) (white), 128 ft (39 m) (red), 144 ft (44 m) (green)
- Lens: 1st order bivalve Chance Bros. dioptric Fresnel lens
- Intensity: 1,000,000 candela
- Range: 26 nmi (48 km; 30 mi) (white), 7 nmi (13 km; 8.1 mi) (red), 8 nmi (15 km; 9.2 mi) (green)
- Characteristic: Fl W 15s, F R (to northeast), F G (to southwest)

Norah Head Light is an active lighthouse located at Norah Head, a headland on the Central Coast, New South Wales, Australia, close to Toukley. It is the last lighthouse of the James Barnet style to be built, and the last staffed lighthouse constructed in New South Wales.

Officially displayed for the first time in 1903, the original vaporized kerosene burner was upgraded in 1923, electrified in 1961 and automated and demanned in 1994, after more than 90 years of being staffed. It celebrated its centenary in 2003.

The concrete block tower is 27.5 metres (90 ft) high, topped by a bluestone gallery. On top of the gallery is the original Chance Bros. lantern. This lantern holds the original housing of the Chance Bros. 1st order bivalve dioptric Fresnel lens. Other important structures include the chief lightkeeper's cottage and assistant keeper's duplex, and a flag house.

== History ==
Cover of the Wyong Shire Council annual report, celebrating Norah Head Light's centenary

Calls for construction of a lighthouse at Norah Head (then "Bungaree Noragh Point") were made as early as 1861 due to many wrecks occurring in the area. A notable supporter in the end of the 19th century was local landholder Edward Hargraves from Noraville. However, these efforts were fruitless for many years. The first formal recommendation to construct the lighthouse was made by the Newcastle Marine Board, just prior to its abolition, in 1897.

The lighthouse was designed in a style similar to the style of James Barnet, by his successor Charles Assinder Harding, who also designed Cape Byron Light and Point Perpendicular Light. It is the last to be designed in this style.

Construction commenced in 1901, undertaken by day labour. Materials were brought by boat and unloaded on a wharf constructed at Cabbage Tree Harbour for that purpose. It was officially lit on 15 November 1903, two years after Cape Byron Light. The first keepers were N. H. Williams as chief keeper, with N. Hanson and S. Kells as assistant keepers.

The cost of the tower and cottages was nearly £24,000, £19,000 for the construction of the tower and £5,000 for the optical apparatus, a Chance Bros. 2nd order bivalve dioptric Fresnel lens with 700 prisms

The original light source was a vaporized kerosene burner and mantle generating a light intensity of 438,000 cd, visible for 18 nautical miles (33 km; 21 mi). The original mechanism was a grandfather clock-type mechanism with the counterweights going down a 100 feet (30 m) central column. The weights went down gradually as the light turned and had to be wound every half an hour. The light revolved every 10 seconds, and was floating in a mercury bath of more than 15,000 pounds (6,800 kg) to lessen the friction. The high speed of rotation made operating the light while it was active very difficult.

On 13 April 1923 the light source was upgraded to a Ford-Schmidt kerosene burner with an intensity of 700,000 candlepower. It was changed to revolve every thirty seconds in 1928, to ease the operation. The stables originally constructed at the complex were converted to a garage in 1960.

On 28 March 1961 the light was electrified, with mains electricity as the power source, and an intensity of 1,000,000 cd. The drive was replaced with a 0.3 amp electric motor. At the same time the staff was cut from three lightkeepers to two.

The light was automated and demanned in 1994. It was one of the last stations in Australia to be demanned, after over 90 years of being staffed.

The current light source is a 1000 Watt 120 Volt tungsten-halogen lamp, which flashes white every 15 seconds(Fl.W. 15s) and can be seen for 26 nautical miles (48 km; 30 mi). It also shows fixed red (F.R.) and green (F.G.) lights for coastal shipping.

The lighthouse celebrated its centenary on 15 November 2003, and the lighthouse appeared on the cover of the Wyong Shire Council annual report for 2003.

== Structures ==
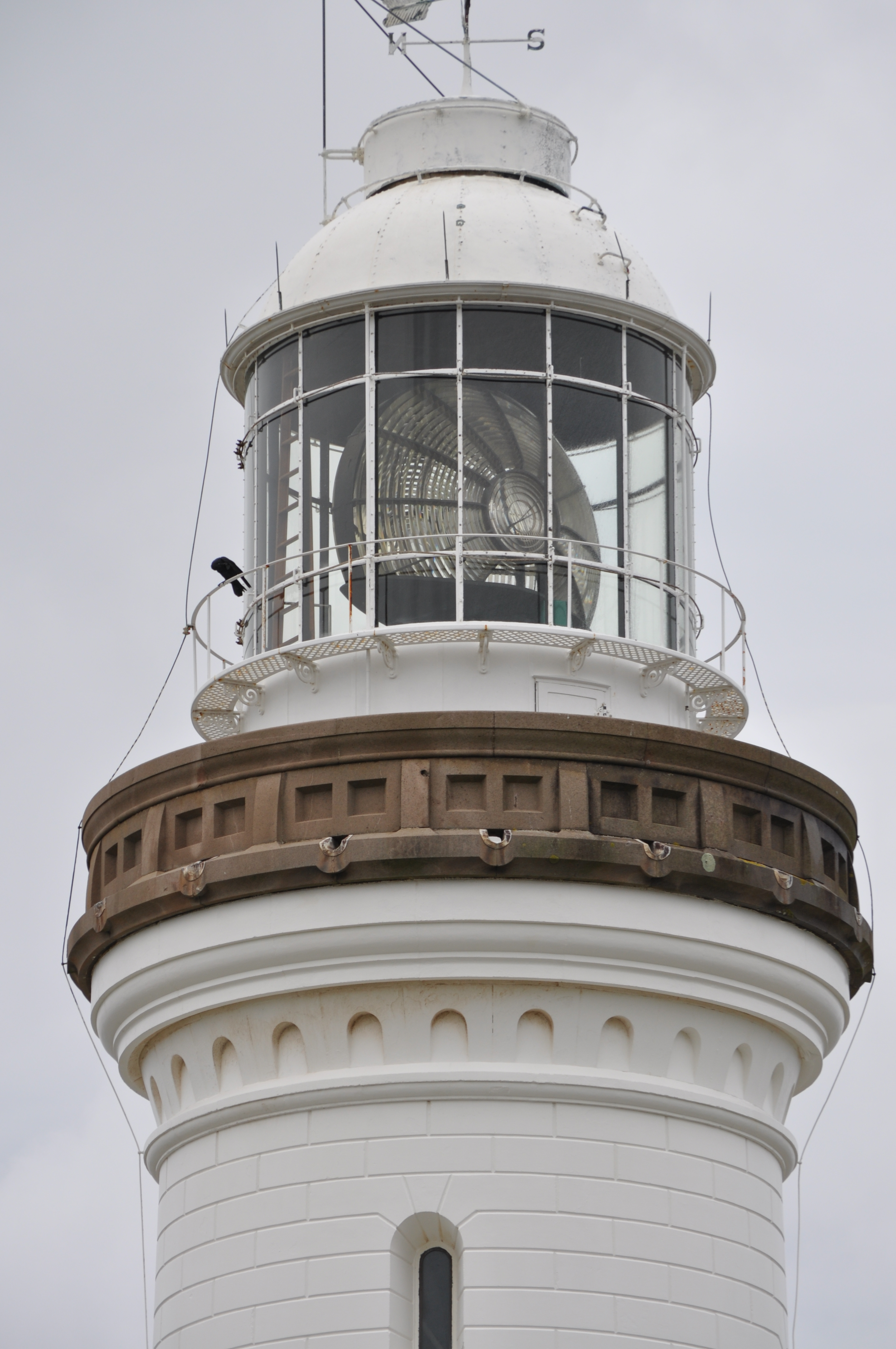
Norah Head Light, detail showing the bluestone balcony and the bivalve lens.

The lighthouse is a 27.5 metres (90 ft) tower, made from concrete blocks. The concrete blocks were made on the ground using a local aggregate, lifted and cemented into position and finally cement rendered inside and out with deep ashlar coursing, and painted white. This technique was used in the period to reduce the cost of construction.

On the inside of the tower, there are 96 steps leading to the gallery in 4 stages, the first 3 of the same grade and the last stage a bit steeper and narrower. The staircase is made of concrete with slate treads and cast iron and brass balustrade.

On top of the tower is a bluestone gallery and balcony with gunmetal railings. The gallery has a painted cast-iron floor grate with a cast-iron stair leading to the outdoor gallery. The lantern room is atop this gallery, made of metal and glass, encircled and protected by perspex and aluminium panels. It has a decorative iron catwalk encircling the glass to allow for cleaning. The lantern house is the original 3,700 millimetres (150 in) Chance Bros. cast-iron-and-copper lantern house, one of about 21 known to exist in Australia.

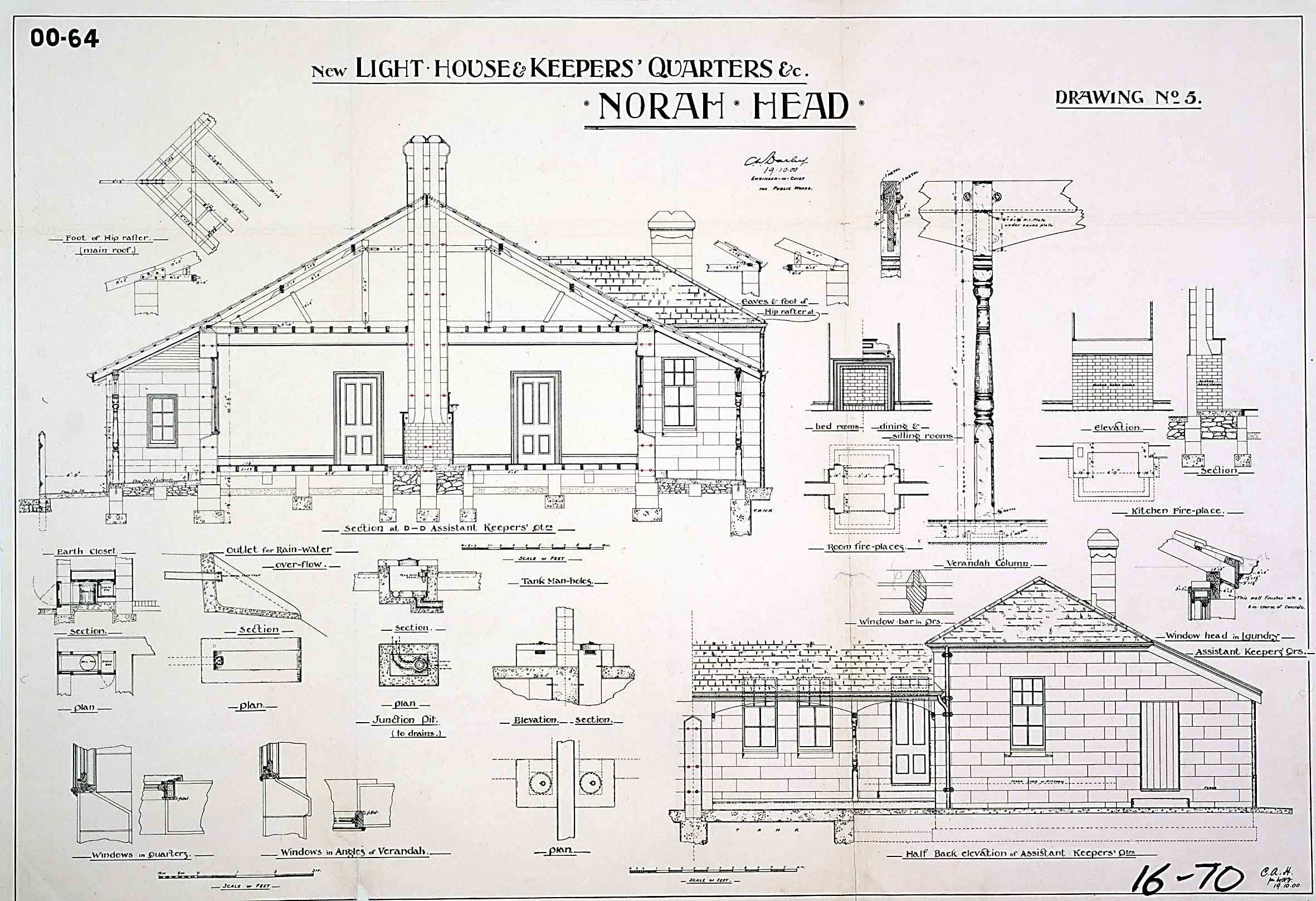
Original plans of the keeper's quarters, 1900

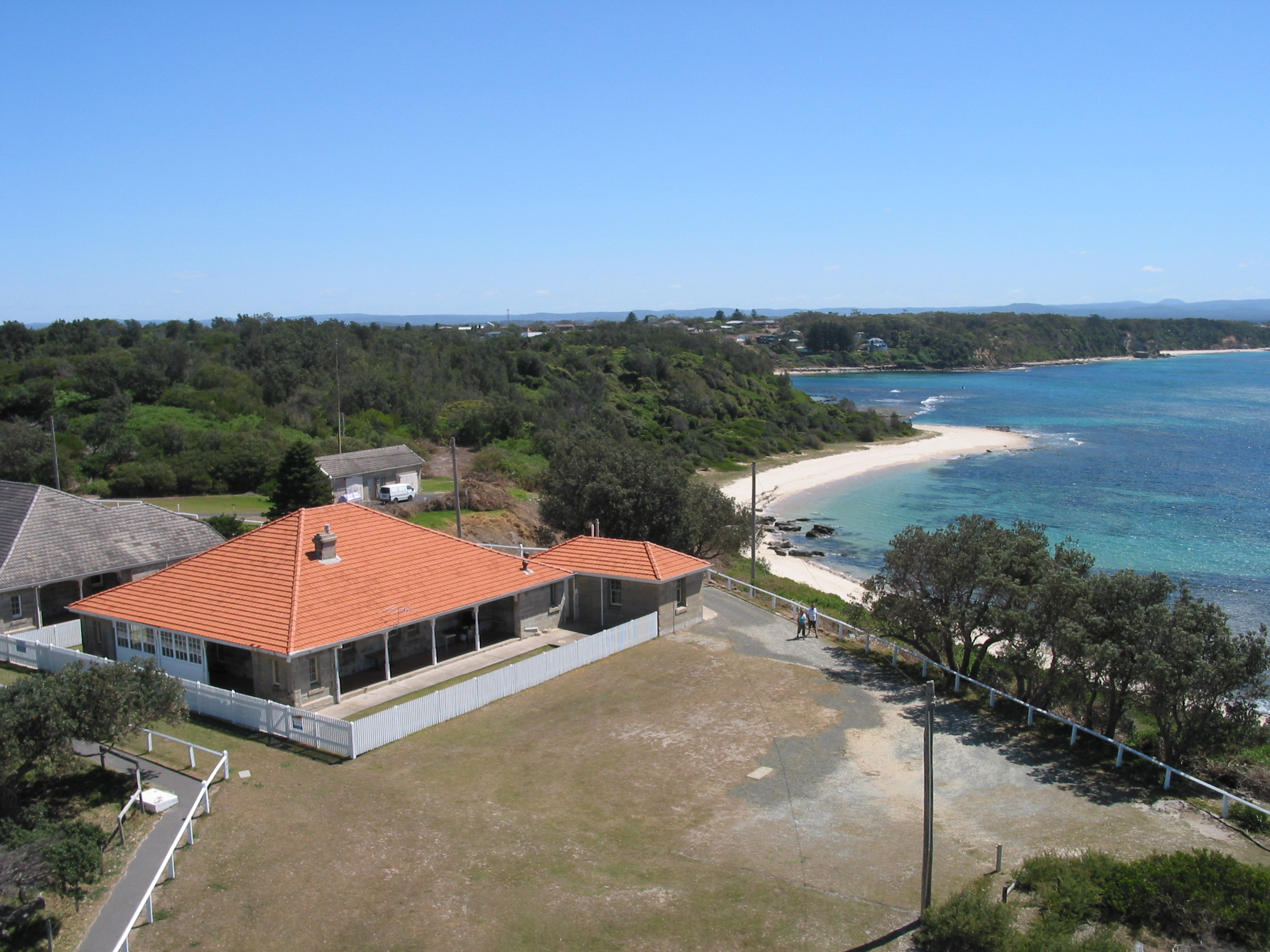
Cottages at Norah Head Lighthouse, view from the lighthouse

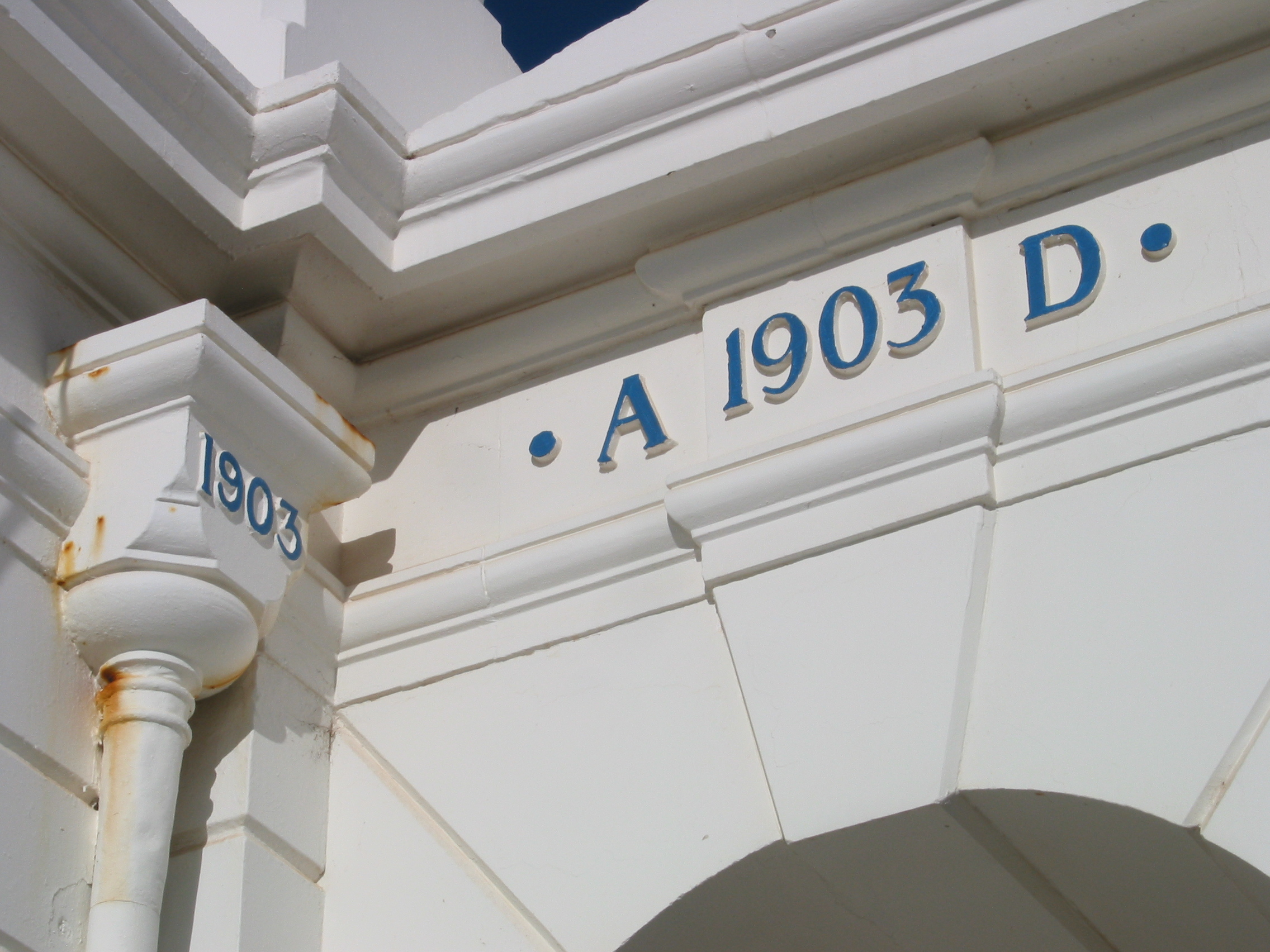
Writing above door in Norah Head Lighthouse

On the ground floor there is an entrance door made of cedar set with sidelights and fanlight, with an etching on the door glass saying Olim Periculum Nunc Salus, Latin for "Once Perilous, Now Safe". Above the door is the writing "•A1903D•", stating the year of official lighting. There is also a "ghost door" on the outside which was planned but never completed.

The first floor comprises an entry hallway and two rooms. The hallway is set with tessellated tiles and still has the original desk for the visitor's book. Of the two rooms, one was the report room used for administrative work, record keeping and logbooks. It is currently used as a radio room. The second room housed a spare mantle holder. It currently houses the electrical controls, including the sensors responsible for starting the light. It also houses the backup batteries, backup diesel generator and fuel tank, as well as a small workshop.

The accommodations in the complex consist of a lightkeepers cottage with garden and Assistant Keeper's duplex, both constructed from concrete blocks, unpainted from construction, and originally having "Marseilles pattern" terracotta tile roofs. The keeper's cottage includes an open verandah on three sides, with cast-iron posts and curved timber beams. The hipped roof is still the original terracotta tiles and one chimney remains. As for the duplex, circa 1970 the roof was replaced with concrete tiles and the chimneys have been demolished.

Also constructed were a small fuel store, workshop, paint store and earth closet near the keeper's cottage, and two fuel stores with earth closet and sink for the assistant cottages. All were constructed in the same form, from unpainted concrete blocks and the same terracotta tile roofs. All still remain in the complex, pretty much intact.

As of 2017, one of the cottages is occupied by a resident keeper and another two are available for overnight accommodations.

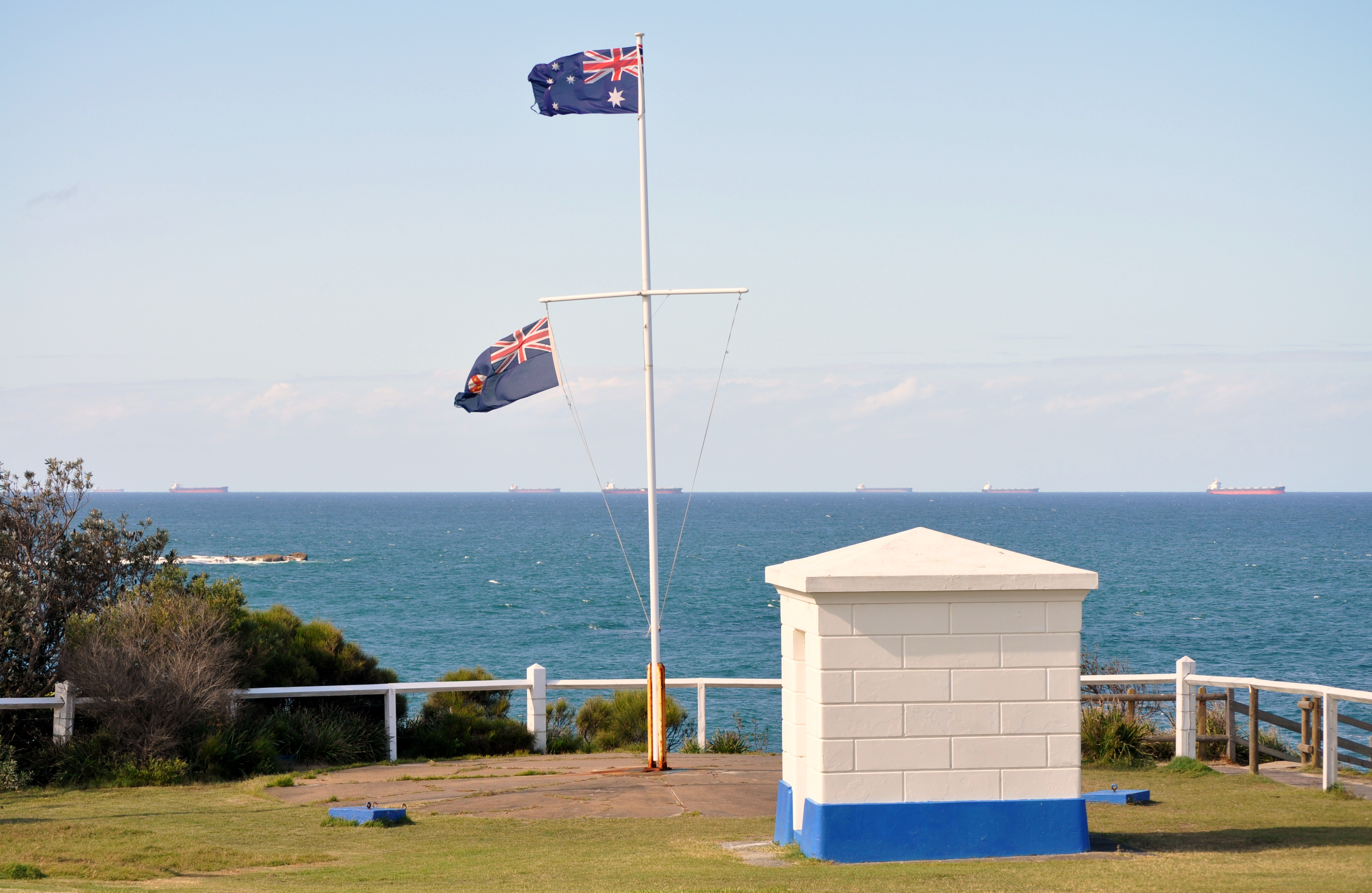
Flag locker building at Norah Head Light.

Another structure at the complex is a small signal house, which was constructed as a flag house for the timber flagstaff, both constructed with the original structures in 1903. The flag house was constructed to match the lighthouse, from precast concrete blocks, rendered walls, with the same plinth and deep ashlar coursing. The roof is made of concrete in a shallow hipped form, in contrast to the concrete dome proposed in the original drawings. The flag locker now houses maritime signal flags. The timber flagstaff was removed at an unknown date, and what remains of it are a concrete and steel base, a concrete apron, and four concrete and iron anchor points.

A stable was also constructed at the premises from the same concrete blocks with Marseilles pattern terracotta tiles. In 1960, as the stables were being converted to a garage, the roof tiles were replaced with concrete tiles. Three timber doors to the former stable, tack and carriage rooms remain.

Also at the complex are underground fresh water tanks and sealed off condensation water tank beneath the tower.

About 100 metres (330 ft) up the hill there used to be a weather station, a mother station for Montague Island in the south and South Solitary Island in the north. Reports used to be collected and sent to the Weather Bureau in Sydney. This is all done electronically now.

== Site operation ==
The light is operated by Transport for NSW, while the lighthouse reserve is managed by the New South Wales Department of Lands since 1997. Until 2013 the tours and accommodations were managed by the Norah Head Lighthouse Reserve Trust, a government appointed trust "Dedicated to the preservation, conservation and management of the Norah Head Lighthouse Reserve." Since 2013 they are managed by the government appointed Norah Head Lighthouse Trust.

== Visiting ==
The lighthouse is on a narrow strip of land that separates the sea from Tuggerah Lake. The site is accessible and the lighthouse is open for guided tours every day of the year except Anzac Day and Christmas Day. Two cottages are available for overnight staying, housing eight people each. It is also available for weddings.

== See also ==
- List of lighthouses in Australia
