= Norah Head =

Norah Head Bungaree's Noragh Point
- Suburb
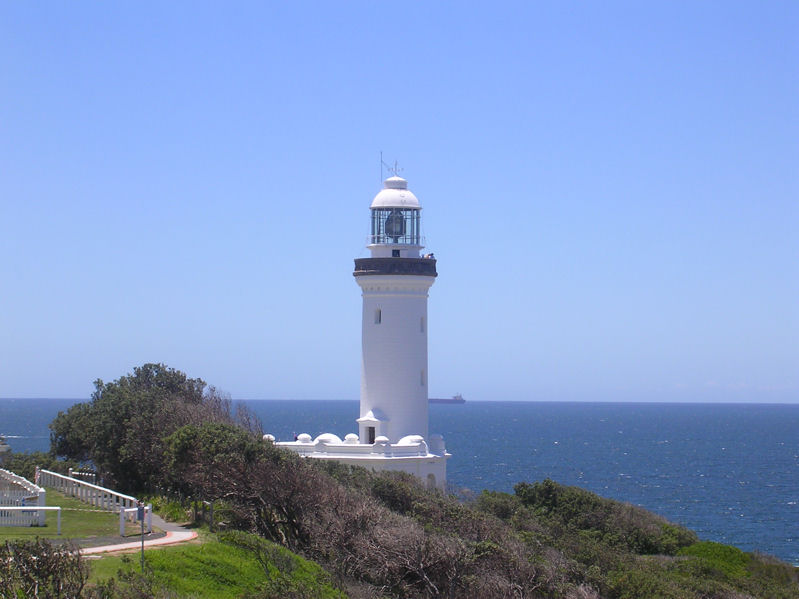
- Norah Head lighthouse, located on the headland

- Interactive map of Norah Head
- Coordinates: 33°16′57″S 151°34′27″E
- Country: Australia
- State: New South Wales
- City: Central Coast
- LGA: Central Coast Council
- Location: 12 km (7.5 mi) NE of The Entrance; 18 km (11 mi) E of Wyong; 55 km (34 mi) SW of Newcastle; 34 km (21 mi) NE of Gosford; 112 km (70 mi) NNE of Sydney

Government
  - State electorate: Wyong
  - Federal division: Dobell
- Elevation: 3 m (9.8 ft)

Population
  - Total: 1,149 (SAL 2021)
- Postcode: 2263
- Parish: Wallarah
Suburbs around Norah Head
Noraville	Noraville	Pacific Ocean
Noraville	Norah Head	Pacific Ocean
Wyrrabalong National Park	Magenta	Pacific Ocean

Norah Head (originally known as Bungaree's Norah after the Indigenous explorer named Bungaree, who was an Awabakal man from the area), is a headland and a coastal village in the Central Coast Council local government area on the Central Coast of New South Wales, Australia. Norah Head is known for its great surfing and clear beaches like Soldiers Beach near Wyrrabalong National Park and Pebbly Beach with Norah Head Rock Pool. The town is home to Norah Head Lighthouse with scenic views along the coast.

== Lighthouse ==
The Norah Head Lighthouse was the last significant lighthouse built in New South Wales, a 63-metre (207 ft) tower, completed in 1903 with monetary assistance from the Hargraves family of Noraville after considerable numbers of ships foundered on the coast near the headland. Originally it was powered by a kerosene concentric wick lamp and still today it features a second order bivalve Fresnel lens prism floating on a mercury bath. At first, the prism was rotated by descending weights, but the light was electrified in 1961 and fully automated in 1995. The light flashes once in 15 seconds, and is visible to 27 nautical miles (50 km), the focal plane is located at 46 metres (151 ft) AHD. For coastal shipping, two additional light signals are shown: a red light in the northeast sector, emitted from 39 metres (128 ft) above the sea and a green one towards southwest, emitted from 44 metres (144 ft); both are continuous. Norah Head Lighthouse is considered to be a popular venue for weddings.

The former lighthouse keepers cottage (Head Keeper's separate cottage and two assistants semi-detached quarters) are maintained, and two of these are available for rent.

== Heritage listings ==
Norah Head has a number of heritage-listed sites, including:

- Bush Street: Norah Head Lightstation Precinct

== World War II ==
Near the head, sea battles between the Japanese Navy and Merchant navy ships took place in World War II: Three ships were sunk, Nimbin, at 1,052 tonnes (1,035 long tons; 1,160 short tons), by a mine on 5 December 1940 and the fishing trawler Millimumul sank with the loss of seven men on 26 March 1941 when it trawled up a German mine laid by the mine ship Pinguin, as well as BHP Shipping's Iron Chieftain, at 4,812 tonnes (4,736 long tons; 5,304 short tons) by a submarine on 3 June 1942. The Age, at 4,775 tonnes (4,700 long tons; 5,264 short tons), was also attacked on the same day.

== Demographics ==
As of the 2021 census, Norah Head had a population of 1,149. The majority of residents (86.6%) were born in Australia, with the next most common countries of birth being England (2.8%), Scotland (1.0%), and New Zealand (0.8%). The most common ancestries were Australian (45.7%), English (43.2%), and Irish (13.2%). English was the primary language spoken at home by 93.0% of the population, while other languages included Greek (0.7%), Spanish (0.6%), and Italian (0.5%).

The most common religious affiliations were No Religion (35.2%), Catholic (26.7%), and Anglican (18.1%), with Christianity overall representing 59.7% of the population. Additionally, 5.1% of the population identified as Aboriginal and/or Torres Strait Islander.

== Geology ==
There are several unique landforms around the head. Immediately in front of the head there is a rock platform which was formed in the Permian to Triassic periods around 180 - 280 million years ago. In the platform there is a volcanic intrusion, a channel of darker rock running from one side of the platform to the other. The intrusion was created by waves quarrying a softer basalt lava flow out of the surrounding granite. The lava came from an ancient volcano, probably Mount Warrawolong to the west.

== Climate ==
Climate data for Norah Head, New South Wales (1989–2022)
Month	Jan	Feb	Mar	Apr	May	Jun	Jul	Aug	Sep	Oct	Nov	Dec	Year
Record high °C (°F)	44.0 (111.2)	39.7 (103.5)	38.1 (100.6)	33.6 (92.5)	28.1 (82.6)	26.3 (79.3)	24.8 (76.6)	29.4 (84.9)	33.5 (92.3)	36.5 (97.7)	41.5 (106.7)	40.7 (105.3)	44.0 (111.2)
Mean daily maximum °C (°F)	26.3 (79.3)	26.1 (79.0)	25.2 (77.4)	23.2 (73.8)	20.3 (68.5)	18.0 (64.4)	17.5 (63.5)	18.9 (66.0)	21.2 (70.2)	22.8 (73.0)	23.9 (75.0)	25.1 (77.2)	22.4 (72.3)
Mean daily minimum °C (°F)	19.8 (67.6)	20.0 (68.0)	18.9 (66.0)	16.1 (61.0)	13.1 (55.6)	11.1 (52.0)	9.8 (49.6)	10.5 (50.9)	12.8 (55.0)	14.9 (58.8)	16.8 (62.2)	18.5 (65.3)	15.2 (59.4)
Record low °C (°F)	14.5 (58.1)	13.9 (57.0)	12.0 (53.6)	7.9 (46.2)	6.9 (44.4)	5.3 (41.5)	4.0 (39.2)	4.6 (40.3)	6.1 (43.0)	8.5 (47.3)	8.8 (47.8)	11.2 (52.2)	4.0 (39.2)
Average precipitation mm (inches)	80.6 (3.17)	122.8 (4.83)	136.5 (5.37)	120.9 (4.76)	124.1 (4.89)	154.4 (6.08)	84.8 (3.34)	69.9 (2.75)	61.5 (2.42)	63.9 (2.52)	94.1 (3.70)	70.4 (2.77)	1,163.9 (45.82)
Average precipitation days	12.5	12.7	14.5	14.1	13.4	14.3	10.8	8.9	11.3	11.3	12.5	12.0	148.3
Average relative humidity (%)	70	72	69	65	64	63	59	56	60	64	68	68	65
Source: Bureau of Meteorology

== Gallery ==
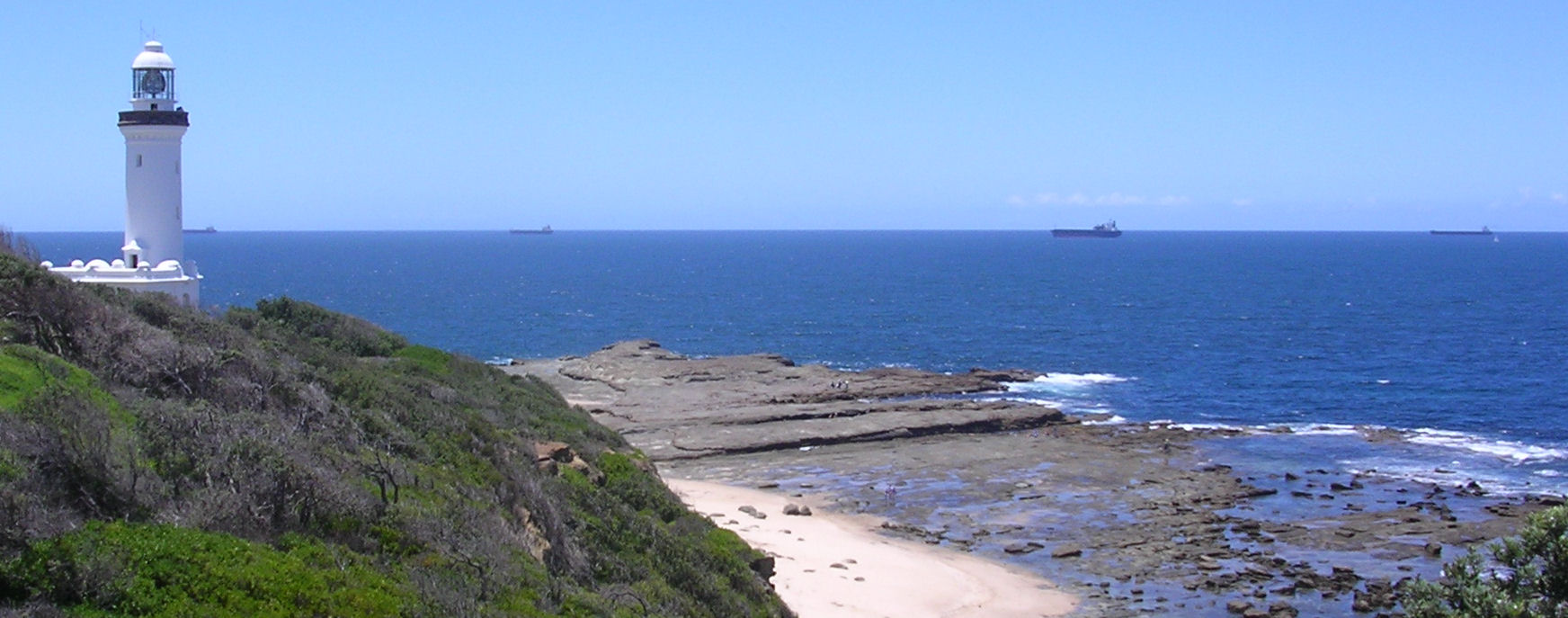
Panoramic view

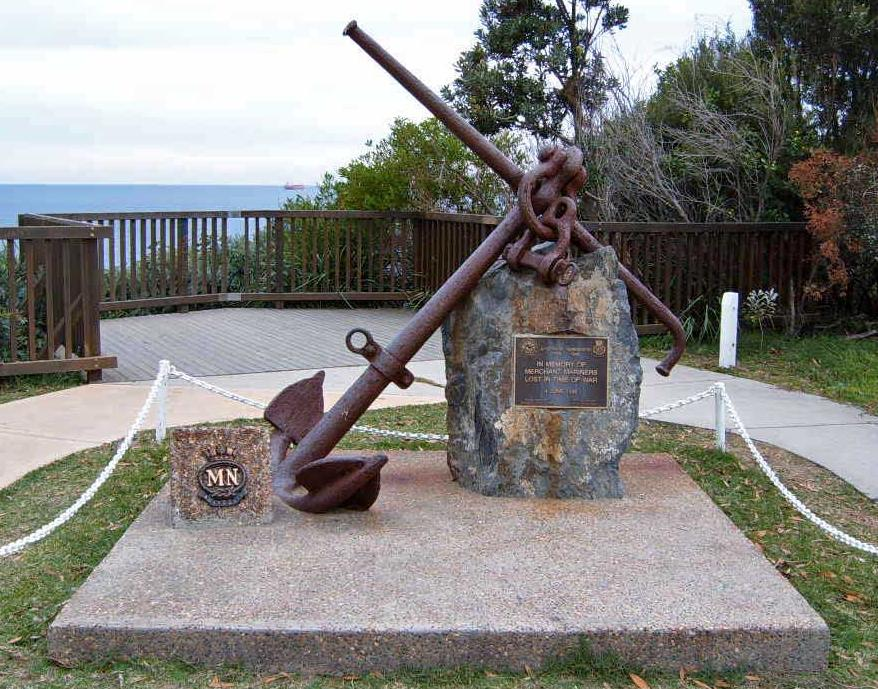
Merchant navy memorial

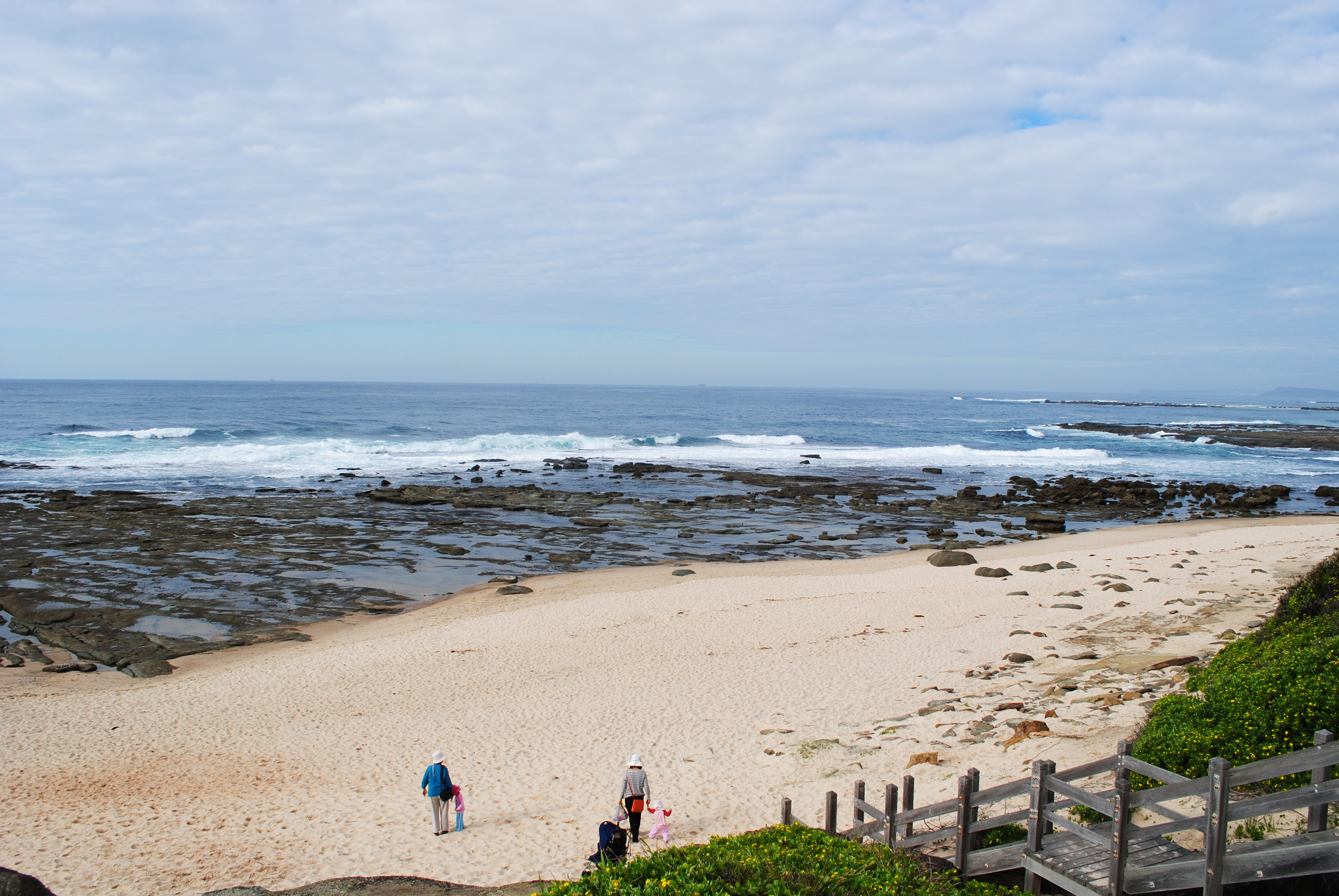
Beach off Norah Head

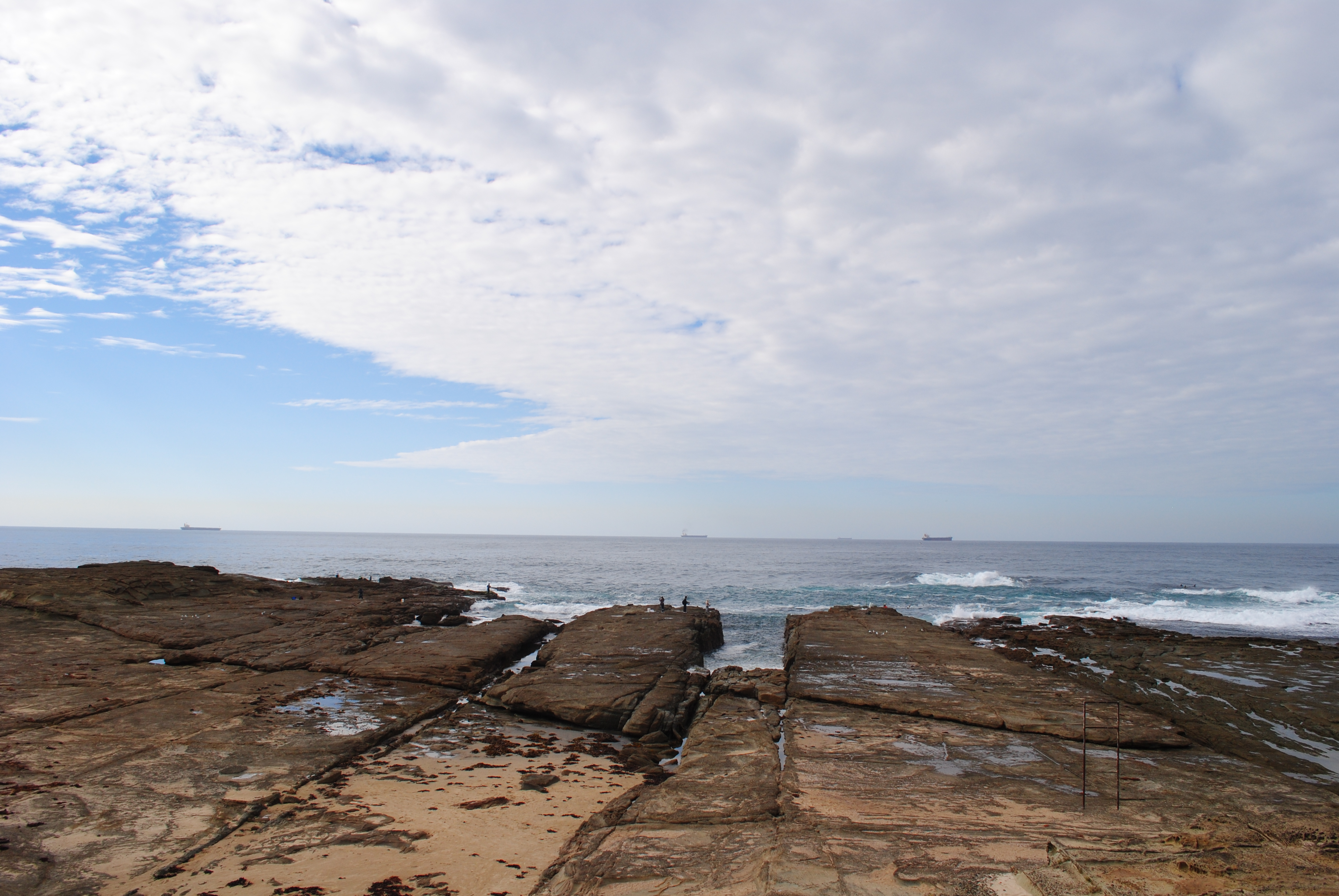
Rock platform off Norah Head

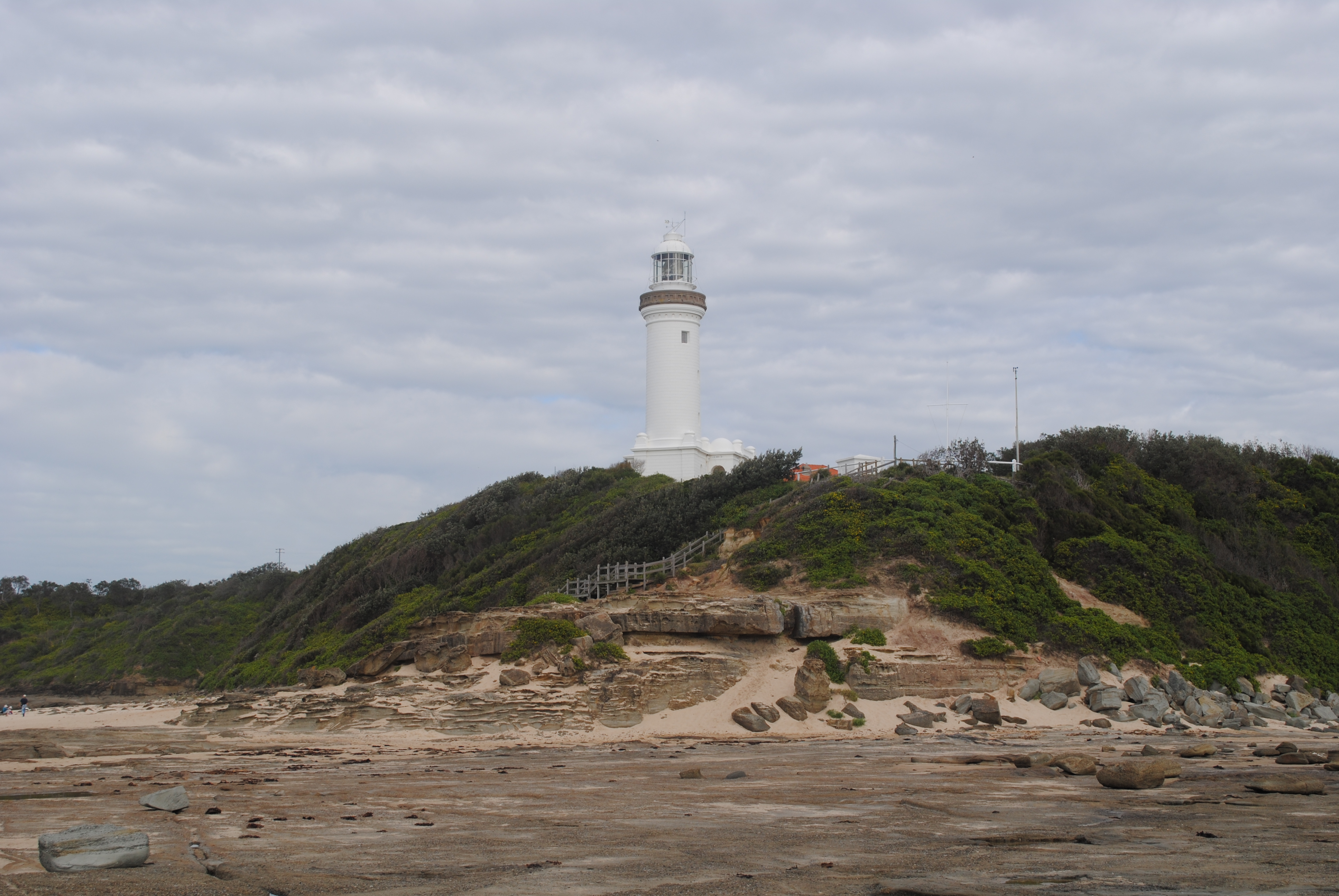
Looking back at the lighthouse from the rock platform

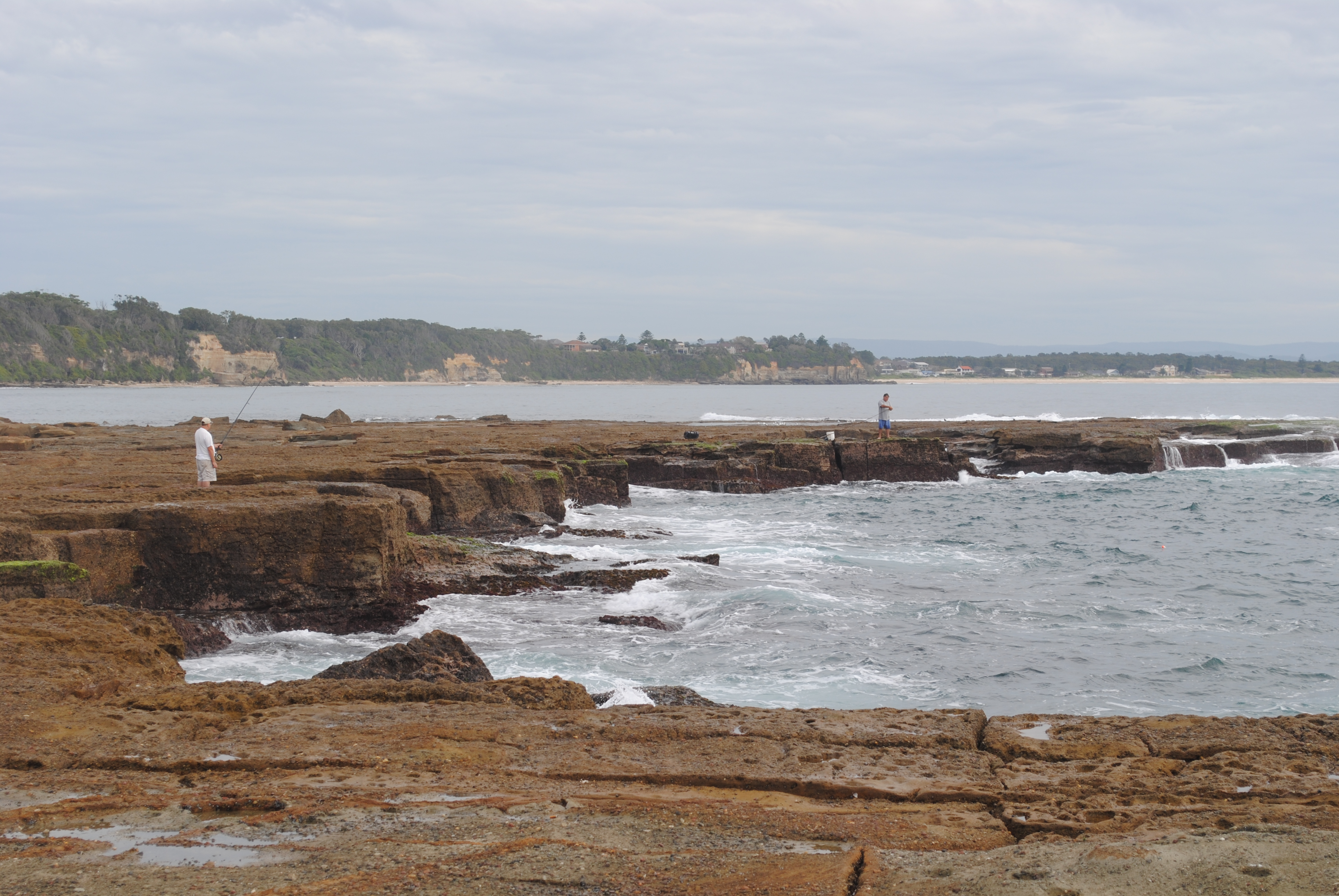
Fishing off Norah Head is a popular activity

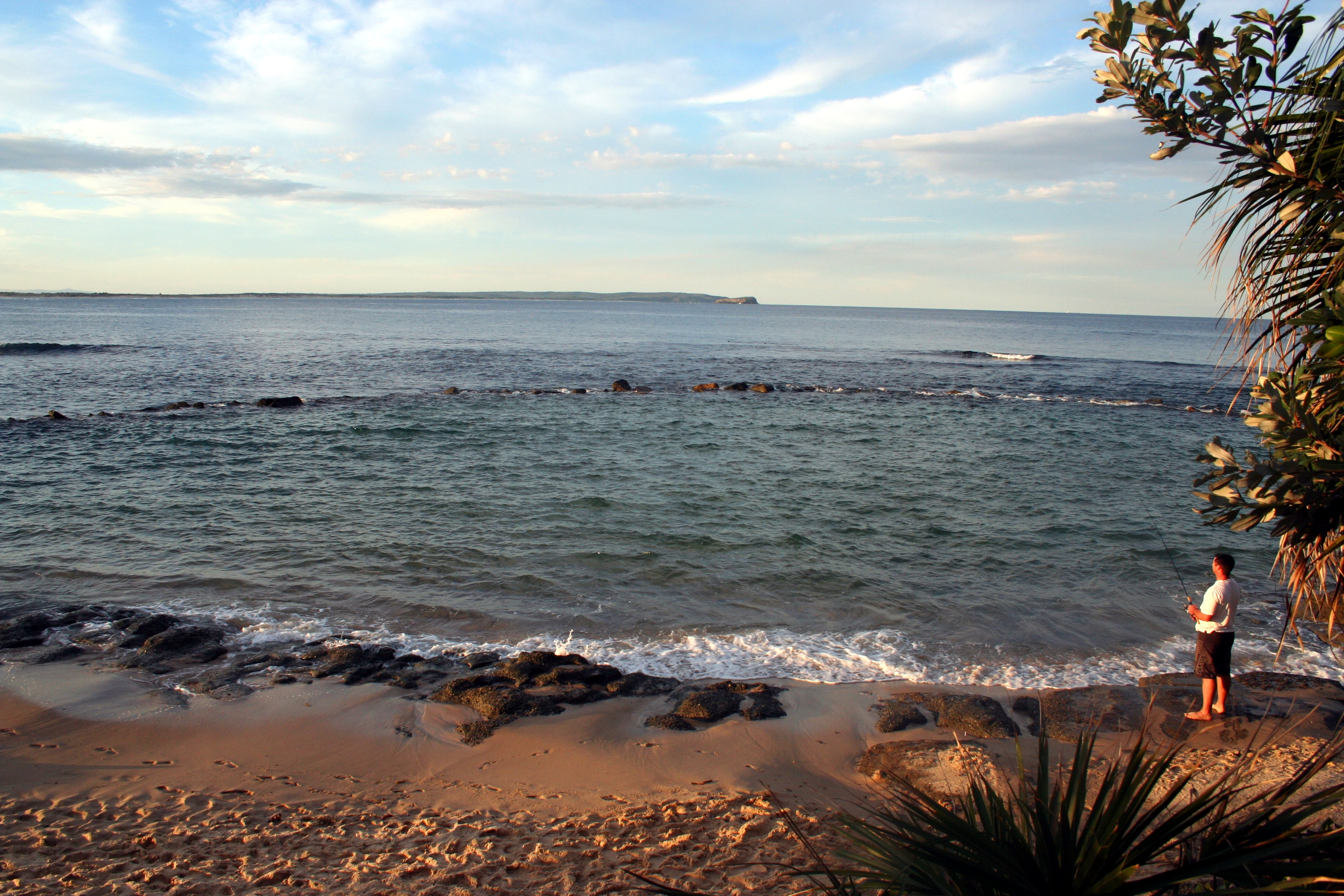
Norah Head rockpool at high tide
