= Gosling Creek Dam =

- Location of Gosling Creek Reservoir in New South Wales
- Country: Australia
- Location: Orange, New South Wales
- Coordinates: 33.3291°S 149.0908°E
- Purpose: Water supply
- Status: Decommissioned
- Construction began: 1888
- Opening date: 9 October 1890 inauguration
- Construction cost: A£32,688
- Owner: Orange City Council

Dam and spillways
- Type of dam: Embankment dam
- Impounds: Gosling Creek
- Height: 16 metres (52 ft)
- Length: 260 metres (850 ft)
- Width (crest): 3 metres (9.8 ft)
- Spillways: 1
- Spillway type: Concrete chute
- Spillway capacity: 2,960 cubic metres per second (105,000 cu ft/s)

Reservoir
- Creates: Gosling Creek Reservoir
- Total capacity: 400 megalitres (14×10^{6} cu ft)
- Catchment area: 17 square kilometres (6.6 sq mi)
- Surface area: 12 hectares (30 acres)
- Maximum water depth: 5 metres (16 ft)

Gosling Creek Dam is a decommissioned minor earth and rock fill with clay core embankment dam with concrete chute spillway across the Gosling Creek upstream of Orange in the central western region of New South Wales, Australia. Commissioned in 1890 to supply Orange with potable water, the dam was decommissioned after the official commissioning of the Suma Park Dam in 1962. The impounded reservoir is called Gosling Creek Reservoir and is now used for recreational purposes.

== Location and features ==
Commenced in 1888 and officially inaugurated in 1890, the Gosling Creek Dam is a minor dam that has since been decommissioned on the Gosling Creek, approximately 4 kilometres (2.5 mi) south of the city of Orange and provided the first town water supply to the city; constructed at a cost of A£32,688, borne by the Orange City Council. Additional dams for water supply were completed in 1918 at built at Meadow Creek Dam and then Spring Creek Reservoir in 1931.

The dam wall height is 16 metres (52 ft) and is 260 metres (850 ft) long. The maximum water depth is 5 metres (16 ft) and at 100% capacity the dam wall holds back 400 megalitres (14×10^{6} cu ft) of water. The surface area of Gosling Creek Reservoir is 12 hectares (30 acres) and the catchment area is 17 square kilometres (6.6 sq mi). The ungated concrete chute spillway is capable of discharging 2,960 cubic metres per second (105,000 cu ft/s).

Gosling Creek was named after Jonathon W. Gosling, a free settler who arrived in Australia by ship in 1827 and the first property owner in the district.

Gosling Creek Reservoir is no longer used for water supply purposes, and in recent years the Orange City Council has developed the area as a recreation reserve. Facilities include a pedestrian and cycle way system, playground, bird hide, passive recreation areas. The reservoir was previously surrounded by pine plantations which have been logged and progressively replaced by native vegetation plantings.

In May, 2007 the nearby Cadia mine approached Orange City Council with a request to obtain water from Gosling Creek Reservoir for mining purposes due to their dwindling water supplies as a result of the ongoing drought.

== See also ==
- List of dams and reservoirs in New South Wales
