= Spring Creek Dam (New South Wales) =

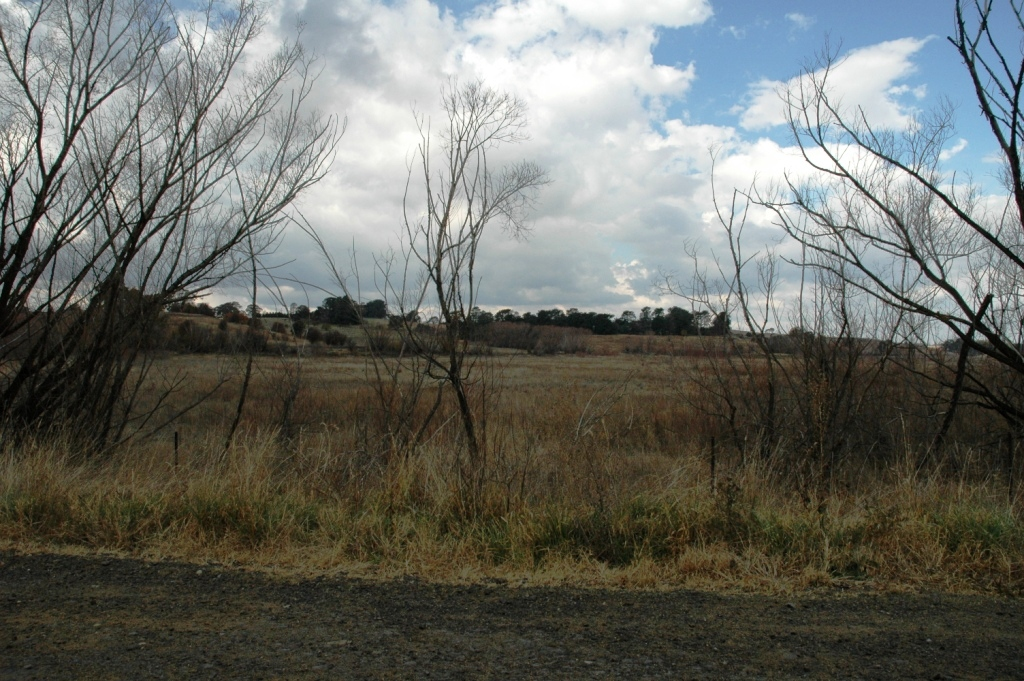
- Spring Creek Reservoir at very low level, 2008.

- Location of Spring Creek Dam in New South Wales
- Country: Australia
- Location: Orange, New South Wales
- Coordinates: 33°19′54″S 149°07′04″E
- Purpose: Water supply
- Status: Operational
- Construction began: December 1929
- Opening date: 1931
- Owner: Orange City Council

Dam and spillways
- Type of dam: Embankment dam
- Impounds: Spring Creek
- Height: 17 metres (56 ft)
- Length: 268 metres (879 ft)
- Spillways: 1
- Spillway capacity: 310 cubic metres per second (11,000 cu ft/s)

Reservoir
- Creates: Spring Creek Reservoir
- Total capacity: 4,680 megalitres (165×10^{6} cu ft)
- Catchment area: 63 square kilometres (24 sq mi)
- Surface area: 11 hectares (27 acres)
- Maximum length: 2.5 kilometres (1.6 mi)
- Maximum width: 350 metres (1,150 ft)

Spring Creek Dam is a minor embankment dam across the Spring Creek upstream of Orange in the central western region of New South Wales, Australia. The impounded reservoir is called the Spring Creek Reservoir.

== Location and features ==
Commenced in December 1929 and completed in 1931, the Spring Creek Dam is a minor dam on the Spring Creek, located approximately 4 kilometres (2.5 mi) south-east of the city of Orange; constructed by NSW Department of Public Works on behalf of the Orange City Council as the main water supply for Orange. Additional dams for water supply were completed in 1918 at Meadow Creek Dam and the Gosling Creek Dam in 1890. Since the construction of Suma Park Dam, completed in 1962, Spring Creek Dam has served as the secondary water supply for the city.

The embankment dam wall is 17 metres (56 ft) high and is 268 metres (879 ft) long. At 100% capacity the dam wall holds back 4,680 megalitres (165×10^{6} cu ft) of water. The surface area of Spring Creek Reservoir is 11 hectares (27 acres) and the catchment area is 63 square kilometres (24 sq mi). The spillway is capable of discharging 310 cubic metres per second (11,000 cu ft/s).

Recently Orange City Council has strengthened the dam wall. Kinross Wolaroi School also uses the dam for the sport of rowing.

== See also ==
- List of dams and reservoirs in New South Wales

== Gallery ==
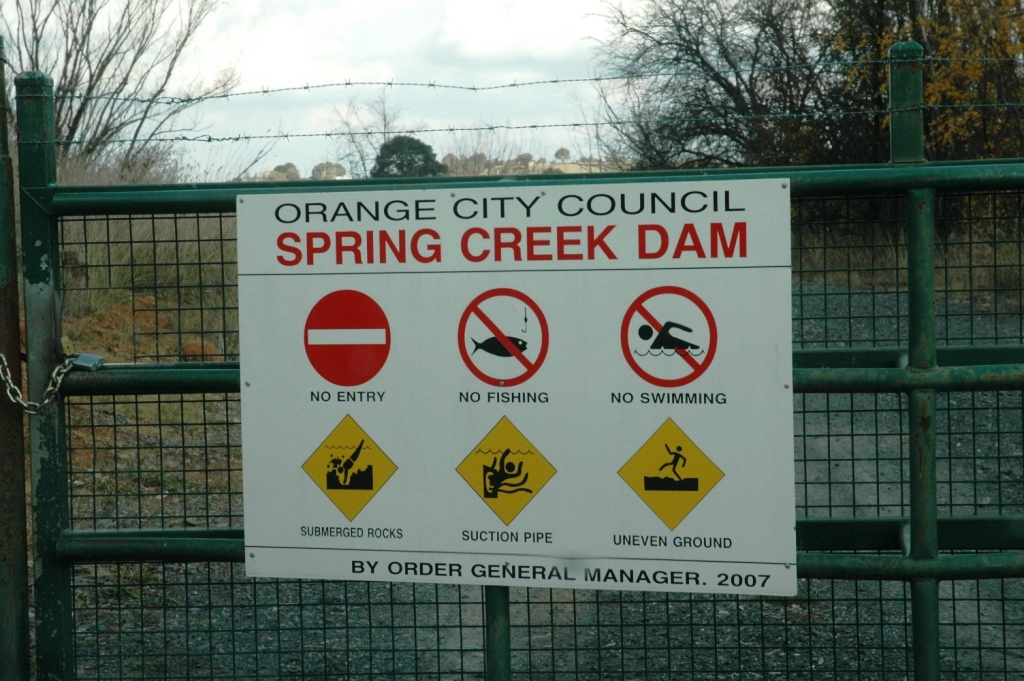
A sign at the entrance to the Spring Creek Reservoir, off Lone Pine Avenue.
