= Bowen Terrace =

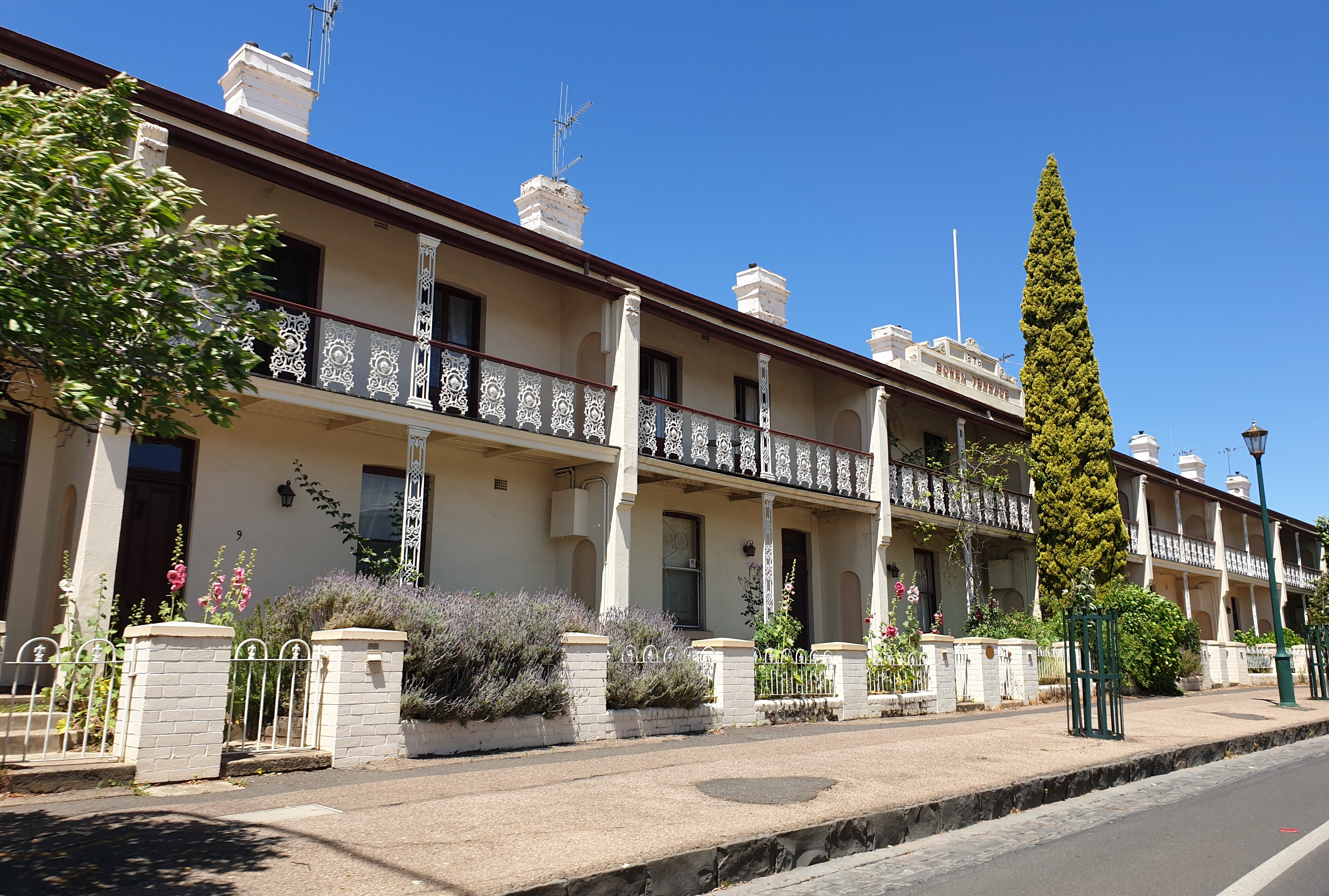

- Location within New South Wales Location within Australia
- 33°17′08″S 149°06′23″E
- Location: 3–25 Bathurst Road, Orange, City of Orange, New South Wales, Australia

History
- Built: 1876
- Built for: Henry Thomas Bowen

Site notes
- Architect: John Hale
- Architectural style: Victorian Italianate

New South Wales Heritage Register
- Official name: Bowen Terrace
- Type: State heritage (built)
- Designated: 2 April 1999
- Reference no.: 13
- Type: Terrace
- Category: Residential buildings (private)

Bowen Terrace is a heritage-listed series of terrace houses located at 3–25 Bathurst Road, Orange, in the Central West region of New South Wales, Australia. It was designed by John Hale. The property is privately owned. It was added to the New South Wales State Heritage Register on 2 April 1999.

== History ==
Bowen Terrace stands on part of 256.2 hectares (633 acres) granted to Joseph Moulder in 1836. In 1875 Henry Thomas Bowen purchased 3.281 hectares (8.11 acres) from Moulder and in 1876 he constructed Bowen Terrace. Bowen Terraces was designed by the town's Architect John Hale who also designed his home, Glenroi House, built at the same time. William Hawke purchased the Terrace from Bowen (date unknown) and the father of the present owner purchased the property in 1924.

It is a two-storey terrace building constructed of stuccoed brick with a continuous roof covered with corrugated iron. The balconies and columns are of cast iron. The Terrace was restored in 1968–72, the builder being Mr B. Tate.

== Description ==
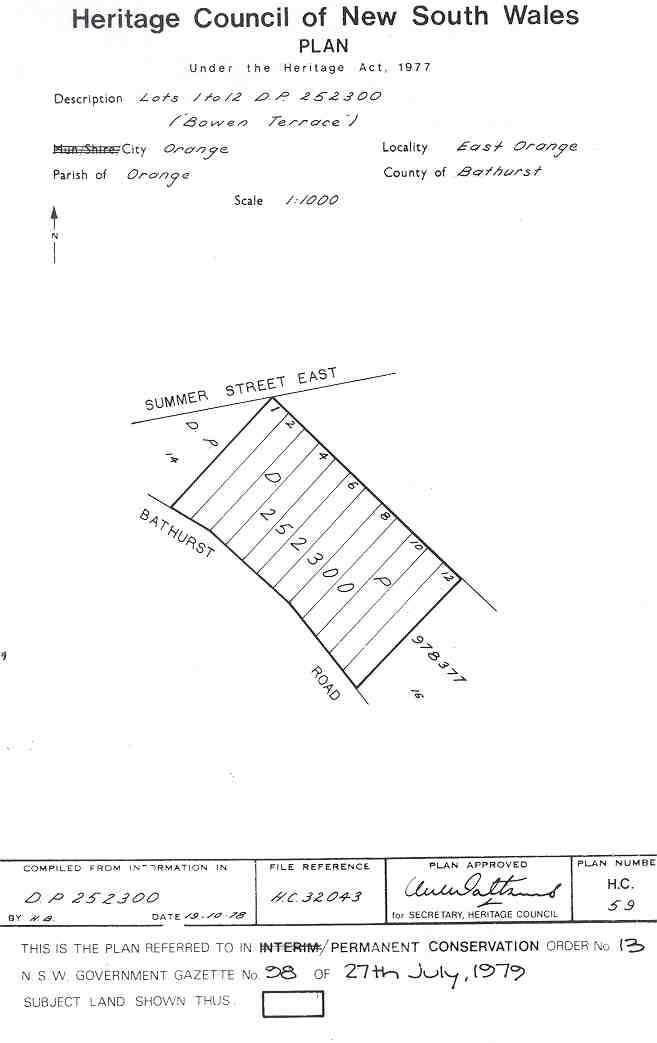
Heritage boundaries

A row of twelve Victorian Italianate terraces with encompassing hip-ended long gable roofs of rendered brick. Party walls extended to the upper verandah roof only. Curved verandah roof supported on flat cast iron columns with cast iron trim and balustrade on both levels. Two pairs of French doors per dwelling on the upper floor. Solid panelled timber entrance door (with a low arch and transon light). The name and construction date of 1876 is on the central decorative parapet.

At the present time, they are painted a dark chocolate with white trim.

=== Condition ===
As at 13 August 1997, the physical condition was fair to good. Research needs to be done into the colour scheme.

== Heritage listing ==
Bowen Terrace was listed on the New South Wales State Heritage Register on 2 April 1999.

== See also ==
- Australian residential architectural styles
