= Orange Post Office =

Historic commonwealth heritage site in New South Wales, Australia

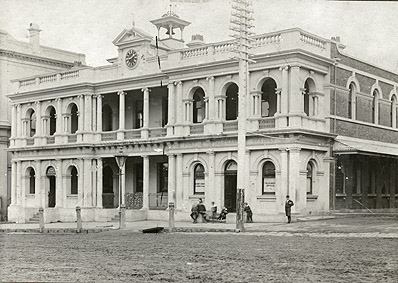
- Orange Post Office, undated

- Location within New South Wales Location within Australia
- 33°17′02″S 149°06′00″E
- Location: 221 Summer Street, Orange, City of Orange, New South Wales, Australia

History
- Built: 1877–1879

Site notes
- Architects: James Barnet; Colonial Architect’s Office
- Architectural style: Victorian Free Classical
- Owner: Australia Post

New South Wales Heritage Register
- Official name: Orange Post Office
- Type: State heritage (built)
- Designated: 22 December 2000
- Reference no.: 1416
- Type: Post Office
- Category: Postal and Telecommunications
- Builders: J.Douglas

The Orange Post Office is a heritage-listed post office located at 221 Summer Street, Orange, City of Orange, New South Wales, Australia. It was designed by Designed by the Colonial Architect’s Office under James Barnet and built by J. Douglas. The property is owned by Australia Post. It was added to the New South Wales State Heritage Register on 22 December 2000.

== History ==
=== Background ===
The first official postal service in Australia was established in April 1809, when the Sydney merchant Isaac Nichols was appointed as the first Postmaster in the colony of NSW. Prior to this, mail had been distributed directly by the captain of the ship on which the mail arrived, however this system was neither reliable nor secure.

In 1825 the colonial administration was empowered to establish a NSW Postmaster General's Department, which had previously been administered from Britain.

In 1828 the first post offices outside of Sydney were established, with offices in Bathurst, Campbelltown, Parramatta, Liverpool, Newcastle, Penrith and Windsor. By 1839 there were forty post offices in the colony, with more opened as settlement spread. During the 1860s, the advance of postal services was further increased as the railway network began to be established throughout NSW. In 1863, the Postmaster General WH Christie noted that accommodation facilities for Postmasters in some post offices was quite limited, and stated that it was a matter of importance that "post masters should reside and sleep under the same roof as the office".

The first telegraph line was opened in Victoria in March 1854 and in NSW in 1858. The NSW colonial government constructed two lines from the Sydney GPO, one to the South Head Signal Station, the other to Liverpool. Development was slow in NSW compared to the other states, with the Government concentrating on the development of country offices before suburban ones. As the line spread, however, telegraph offices were built to accommodate the operators. Unlike the Post Office, the telegraph office needed specialised equipment and could not be easily accommodated in a local store or private residence. Post and telegraph offices operated separately until January 1870 when the departments were amalgamated, after which time new offices were built to include both postal and telegraph services. In 1881 the first telephone exchange was opened in Sydney, three years after the first tests in Adelaide. As with the telegraph, the telephone system soon began to extend into country areas, with telephone exchanges appearing in country NSW from the late 1880s onwards. Again the Post Office was responsible for the public telephone exchange, further emphasising its place in the community as a provider of communications services.

The appointment of James Barnet as Acting Colonial Architect in 1862 coincided with a considerable increase in funding to the public works program. Between 1865 and 1890 the Colonial Architects Office was responsible for the building and maintenance of 169 Post Offices and telegraph offices in NSW. The post offices constructed during this period featured in a variety of architectural styles, as Barnet argued that the local parliamentary representatives always preferred "different patterns".

The construction of new post offices continued throughout the depression years under the leadership of Walter Liberty Vernon, who held office from 1890 to 1911. While twenty-seven post offices were built between 1892 and 1895, funding to the Government Architect's Office was cut from 1893 to 1895, causing Vernon to postpone a number of projects.

Following Federation in 1901, the Commonwealth Government took over responsibility for post, telegraph and telephone offices, with the Department of Home Affairs Works Division being made responsible for post office construction. In 1916 construction was transferred to the Department of Works and Railways, with the Department of the Interior responsible during World War II.

On 22 December 1975, the Postmaster-General's Department was abolished and replaced by the Postal and Telecommunications Department, with Telecom and Australia Post created as trading entities. In 1989, the Australian Postal Corporation Act established Australia Post as a self-funding entity, heralding a new direction in property management, including a move away from the larger more traditional buildings towards smaller shop front style post offices.

For much of its history, the post office has been responsible for a wide variety of community services including mail distribution, an agency for the Commonwealth Savings Bank, electoral enrolments, and the provision of telegraph and telephone services. The town post office has served as a focal point for the community, most often built in a prominent position in the centre of town close to other public buildings, creating a nucleus of civic buildings and community pride.

=== Orange Post Office ===
The first European settlement in Orange began during the early 1820s, when a convict cattle station was established. The region was opened up for free settlement after 1826, when Governor Darling redefined the limits of location. Originally known as Blackmans Swamp, the village of Orange was proclaimed and surveyed in 1846. The first post office was established in 1849, and is reported to have been within the store of John Woodward, fronting the road to Bathurst.

Orange's population began to rise rapidly with the discovery of gold in the district, and the village gradually filled with buildings of more permanence. The second post office was constructed during this period (1851–55) with a John Arkins as Postmaster. Arkins' annual salary was £12, increasing to £50 by 1855 when James Dale was Postmaster, and then to £100 by 1861, an indication of the growing postal business in Orange. In December 1860 the Telegraph reached Orange, six years after its introduction to Australia. The Telegraph Station Master was Robert Pizey, who was appointed with a salary of £150. Pizey was succeeded by Charles Cooper as Telegraph Master in October 1862.

From 1 January 1870 the post office and telegraph offices were amalgamated in Australia. In Orange, Charles Cooper stayed on as Telegraph Master while his wife Rose Cooper was appointed Post mistress. It seems that the two offices operated out of the same building at this time, although no official record of this exists. In 1877, Charles Cooper wrote to the Post Master General asking for further assistance in the running of the Post Office, complaining that he was often at the office from 8.30am till 10pm, longer when he had to receive or dispatch mail. As a result of Cooper's request, he was appointed as Postmaster as well as Telegraph Master from 15 October 1877, a position he held until his retirement in 1897, and an assistant was employed at £100 per annum.

The Colonial Architect James Barnet prepared plans for the present Post Office during 1877, which would adequately accommodate both the postal and telegraph services. The plan included accommodation for the District Surveyor and Road Superintendent, as well as the Post and Telegraph Office in the one building. The estimated cost for construction came to £6,000. The building tender was accepted from a Mr J. Douglas on 18 November 1878. A clock and turret were added to the design during 1879 at an extra cost of £395, with the clock itself costing £205. The building was completed on 29 December 1879 and officially opened by the Postmaster General, Mr S. Samuel on 10 February 1880.

During 1903 the decision was made to take over the entire building for use as the Post Office and to carry out alterations and additions. A tender from Mr J. H. Gains was accepted for the work at £1,397. In August 1903, the Road Superintendent vacated the section of the building he had occupied, and the Post Office moved into this section while the work was completed in the main office. Three upstairs rooms, which had been occupied by the School of Arts were also taken over by the Post Office, while the telephone switchboard was placed in the upper front room. The repairs and alteration were finalised on 14 July 1904 at a total cost of £1,500.

Further additions were made to the Post Office in 1913. A number of further alterations to the building have occurred since this time, including the relocation of the southwestern stair, addition of the toilets in the 1950-60s and electrification of the clock mechanism in 1983. The Post Office interior was remodelled in c. 1995 to improve retail services.

== Description ==
Orange Post Office is an imposing, finely scaled and detailed two-storey Victorian Free Classical building, and is located within the heart of the city's civic centre and is surrounded by predominantly two-storey retail and commercial late nineteenth- and mid- to late twentieth-century buildings. It is constructed of rendered and painted masonry in a cream and stone painted colour scheme. The predominantly hipped and gable-ended roof is of corrugated iron, with a balustraded parapet to the northern facade and part way down the western facade. There is a central clock with a white and black face installed at the centre of the northern facade parapet, and it is surmounted by a broken-apex pediment. Below the clock face is a dentilled, moulded string course and there is a bracketed moulded string course on the first floor level.

A pyramidal corrugated iron roof supported by cast iron corner posts, with an ornate weathervane at the apex, caps off the open belfry behind the clock face. The roof of the two-storey section is punctuated by three tall, rendered and painted corbelled chimneys; two at the eastern edge and one at the south-western side.

The northern facade has a two-storey verandah, with rendered masonry arches and columns to both, and infills to three bays of each side of the upper floor. The first-floor centre verandah is painted brown and cream and has a bituminous-coated floor, timber balustrade painted to imitate masonry and board and batten soffit. The ground-floor open arcade runs the entire length of the facade and comprises arched bays and a central colonnaded porch. This verandah has a pebblecrete floor, concrete steps, board and batten ceiling, black wrought iron balustrading and large pendant lights. The masonry arches have decoratively moulded architraves and prominent keystones. The post box niches in the Post Office Lane facade have lockable gates and concrete steps, with brown tiled floors.

The northern facade also comprises a variety of column types, both attached and freestanding, ranging from squat Corinthian-styled columns supporting the moulded window arches to Ionic-styled main columns and square corner pilasters.

Fenestration of the building is symmetrical about the centre line of the front facade, with casement windows featuring arched fanlights in the verandah infills of the top floor and original French doors.

Additions, largely in English Bond face brickwork, have occurred to the rear of the building and in several different stages. These incorporate the weatherboard infill of the upper-floor verandah, the two-storey brick addition to the south-western corner of the two-storey original section of building, the weatherboard addition of a rear dock and two single-storey gable-ended brick additions to the eastern and western boundaries. A concreted yard is retained between these additions and the rear. There is also a more recent skillion-roofed brick cycle shed at the south-western corner of the site.

The interior spaces of the ground floor of Orange Post Office include the carpeted retail area to the north-east, and separate carpeted retail premises in the north-western corner. There are also sheet vinyl floored mail sorting and storage areas to the south, a post boxes wing in the south-western corner and carpeted offices to the centre eastern side. The rear dock space has a textured steel plate floor. The ground-floor ceilings are varied. The retail area and separate retail premises have a plaster ceiling with moulded cornice and exposed beams. There is a plasterboard ceiling in the rear dock and suspended ceilings in the mail room and offices. There is both exposed and enclosed air conditioning ducting in the mail room, retail area and offices, with fluorescent lighting throughout the entire ground floor.

There are original or early architraves located to the original openings and some fragments of early skirting in the stairwell. However, much later architraves and skirting are dominant on this floor. Windows on the ground floor generally comprise single upper and lower pane sash windows, with arched top sashes and white painted frames. Internal doors are modern flush, half glazed and sliding doors. There are later front doors in the separate retail premises and automatic doors in the Post Office.

Walls are rendered and painted masonry in a generally grey colour scheme standard to the Australia Post fitout of the 1990s and there are smooth-rendered, Doric-styled structural columns located in both the retail area of Australia Post and in the adjacent retail premises. There are no fireplaces retained to the ground floor. The main stair to the first-floor has been relocated during past renovations and comprises grey painted turned timber posts and balusters with a shaped rail. Treads are clad with vinyl sheet with black edge strips. The first-floor is largely unoccupied and the Post Office currently utilises the vinyl floored north eastern corner lunch room and verandah, as well as the southeastern corner and southern locker rooms and bathrooms and carpeted northern meeting room. Ceilings to the first floor are a combination of board and batten to the lunch room and southwestern locker room, suspended ceilings to the meeting room and adjacent vacant room to the south, and flush plaster ceiling in the hall, southeastern locker room and stairwell. There is a plasterboard ceiling in the southern verandah infill and v-jointed boarded ceiling to the northern verandah infills. There is a ceiling fan in the lunch room and the entire floor is lit by fluorescent tube lighting. The wide first-floor skirting appears to be original to the original building fabric, with original architraves. There is later, plain skirting and architraves to the later additions to the building.

Windows on the first-floor are predominantly two pane upper and lower sash windows, with many later multi-pane windows in the infilled rear verandah. Internal doors are largely four panel original or early, with some later flush doors to later partition walls and former loading area at the centre of the southern verandah infill. There are early internal windows in the former light well on the eastern side. The first-floor walls are predominantly rendered masonry, with later partition walls. The first floor has a cream/apricot and grey trim colour scheme. Fireplaces have been bricked in or boarded over and only one surround has been retained in the southeastern locker room.

Signage for the Post Office comprises a freestanding standard Australia Post sign on the front facade, general shop signage related to the separate retail premises and an attached "Post Office Lane" sign to the north western corner. The street and footpaths are landscaped with trees, planters and low flower beds. The adjacent Post Office Lane is treated with planter boxes, lamp posts, seating, shrubs, trees and a currently disused kiosk.

=== Condition ===
As at 27 June 2001, Orange Post Office is generally in good condition, with some evidence of previous patching. There is some internal water damage and internal downpipe replacement to the first-floor western verandah infill.

The exterior fabric remains largely intact, although the arcading has been partially filled in. The interior fabric has been substantially altered. The Post Office retains the features which make it culturally significant, including architectural details such as the classical front porch with fluted columns, central pediment, and parapeted roof, and its overall form, scale and style.

=== Modifications and dates ===
The original Post Office building completed in 1879 appears to have comprised the northern two-storey section, probably with several rear additions. Unknown additions have been recorded as occurring in 1891–1892, possibly including the stepped down, two-storey addition to the northwestern corner of the original section. In 1899 a Telephone Exchange was opened in Orange, this probably relates to the spaces allocated as such in the 1903 plans of the south-western corner. 1903–04 additions saw the renovation to incorporate the entire building for use by the Post Office. Three upper rooms formerly used by the School of Arts were taken over and the telephone switchboard was placed in the upper front room. 1942 plans indicate the relocation of the southwestern stairwell as having already occurred, shifted to the west and they indicate the presence of the eastern stairwell which was later removed and a light well created, the date of this change is unknown. The date of construction for the weatherboard infill of the rear verandah is unknown, and addition of the male and female toilets to the eastern end, possibly 1950–60s construction. Plans appear to indicate that in 1979 the third post box bay to the southern end of the western facade was added. Some time after 1979 a section of the rear ground floor verandah was enclosed and extended to form the current dock area and the northern facade post boxes were removed, date of construction is unknown. The electrification of the clock mechanism occurred in June 1983. The extension of the eastern side single-storey section of building to the south occurred prior to 1995, probably c. 1989 when demolition was occurring to the rear of the site. This is probably close to the time when the brick cycle shed to the southwestern corner of the site was built and the rear ground-floor verandah disappeared. An extension of the western side wing appears to have occurred before these changes, possibly in the 1970s. c. 1989 saw the photographic recording and demolition of the former stables to the south of the site for car parking. c. 1995 standard Australia Post interior fitout to the ground floor retail area, construction of new partition offices to the eastern side ground floor, separation of the northwestern retail space and installation of automatic front doors.

== Heritage listing ==
As at 27 June 2001, Orange Post Office was significant at a State level for its historical associations, strong aesthetic qualities and social value.

Orange Post Office is associated with the early development of the area in the mid-nineteenth century as it is linked with the original post office established in 1849. It is also associated with the rapid growth of the population of Orange due to the discovery of gold as a second post office was required in the early 1850s to meet the increased demand. Orange Post Office is historically significant because it is associated with the development of communications services in the Orange district in the 1870s as the post office and telegraph services were amalgamated. Orange Post Office also provides evidence of the changing nature of postal and telecommunications in NSW as the telephone exchange was introduced in 1903.

Orange Post Office is also historically significant because it is associated with the NSW Colonial Architect's Office under James Barnet, which designed and maintained a number of post offices across NSW between 1865 and 1890.

Orange Post Office is aesthetically significant because it is a distinctive example of the Victorian Free Classical style, with strong visual appeal. It forms part of a historic streetscape and makes a significant contribution to the character of the Orange civic precinct.

Orange Post Office is also considered to be significant to the community of Orange's sense of place.

Orange Post Office was listed on the New South Wales State Heritage Register on 22 December 2000 having satisfied the following criteria.

The place is important in demonstrating the course, or pattern, of cultural or natural history in New South Wales.

Orange Post Office is associated with the development of postal services in the area from 1849. As such, the current Post Office is associated with the growth of the Orange district during the mid-nineteenth century. It is also associated with the construction of a number of post offices in the 1850s; the result of rapid growth of the population of Orange due to the discovery of gold in the region.

Orange Post Office is historically significant because it is associated with the development of communications services in the Orange district in the 1870s, the time when the post office and telegraph services were amalgamated.

Orange Post Office provides evidence of the changing nature of postal and telecommunications practices in NSW, as the telephone exchange was introduced in 1903.

Orange Post Office is historically significant because it is associated with the Colonial Architect's Office under James Barnet, which designed and maintained a large number of post offices across NSW between 1865 and 1890.

The place is important in demonstrating aesthetic characteristics and/or a high degree of creative or technical achievement in New South Wales.

Orange Post Office is an architecturally distinct building of Victorian Free Classical style, with such finely scaled and detailed characteristics as the pediment with open apex, parapet concealing roof, and classical arcade. Orange Post Office is aesthetically significant because it is a fine example of the Victorian Free Classical Style with strong visual appeal. It forms part of a historic streetscape and makes a significant contribution to the character of the Orange civic precinct.

The place has a strong or special association with a particular community or cultural group in New South Wales for social, cultural or spiritual reasons.

As a prominent civic building with strong streetscape appeals and the centre of communications for over a century, Orange Post Office is considered to be significant to the community of Orange's sense of place.

The place has potential to yield information that will contribute to an understanding of the cultural or natural history of New South Wales.

The site has some potential to contain archaeological information which may provide information relating to the previous use of the site and the evolution of the building and out-buildings associated with use by the Post Office.

The place possesses uncommon, rare or endangered aspects of the cultural or natural history of New South Wales.

Orange Post Office is an important building, as it is linked to the early development of the city and surrounding region. It forms a key element of a set of Victorian buildings, enhancing the character of the civic precinct with its fine architectural scale and form.

The place is important in demonstrating the principal characteristics of a class of cultural or natural places/environments in New South Wales.

The Orange Post Office represents the first use of the arcaded form for a large regional post office. Orange Office is also a clear example the Victorian Free Classical style of architecture. It is part of the group of nineteenth-century post offices in NSW designed by the Colonial Architect's Office under James Barnet.

== See also ==
- Australian non-residential architectural styles
