= Uniting Church and Kindergarten Hall, Orange =

- Wesley Uniting Church
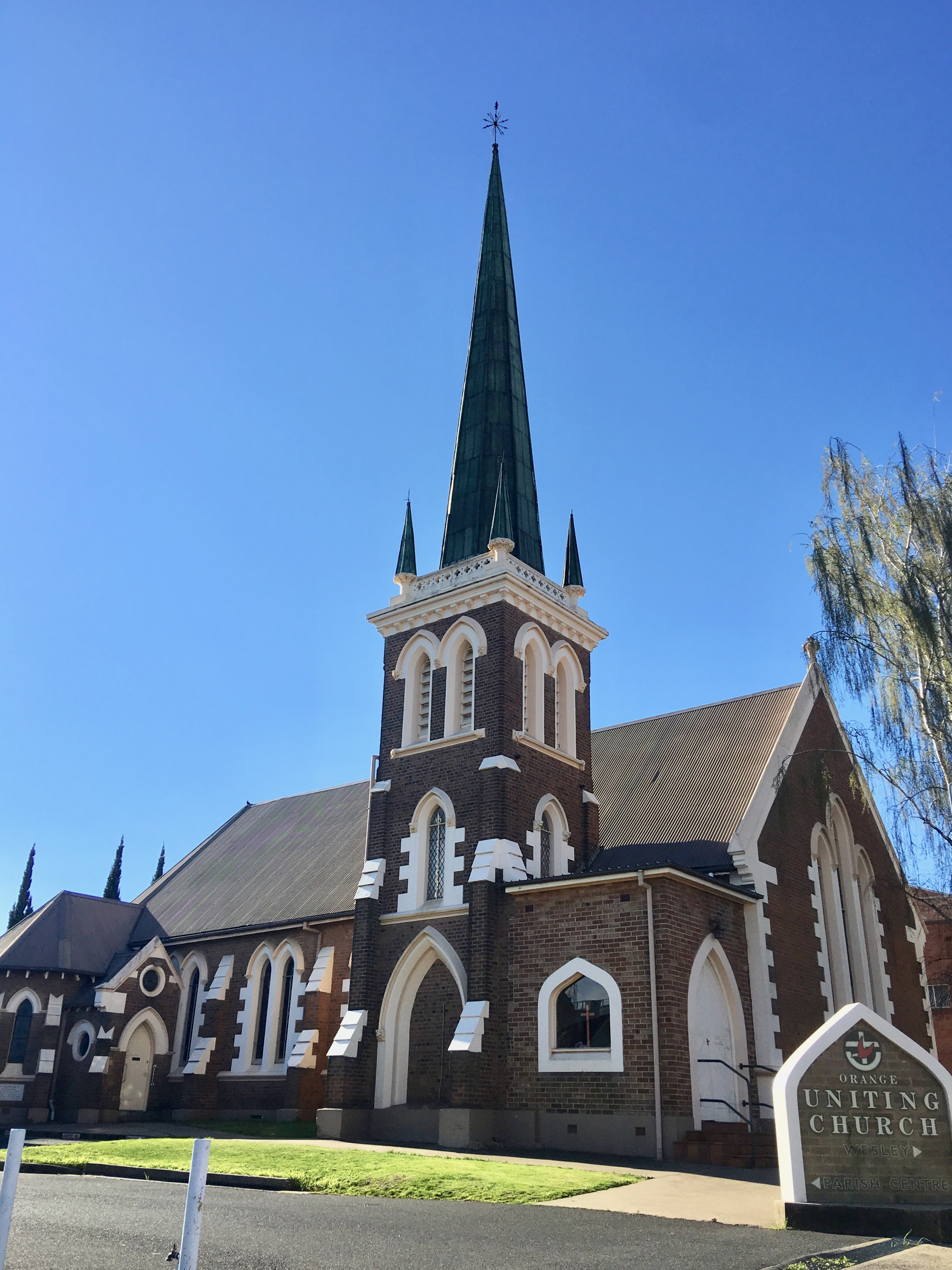
- Uniting Church and Kindergarten Hall, Orange in 2019

- Location of Uniting Church and Kindergarten Hall in New South Wales
- 33°16′58″S 149°05′54″E
- Location: 219–255 Anson Street, Orange, City of Orange, New South Wales
- Country: Australia
- Denomination: Uniting Church in Australia
- Website: orangeunitingchurch.org

History
- Status: Church

Architecture
- Functional status: Active

Administration
- Parish: Uniting Church Orange Parish

New South Wales Heritage Register
- Official name: Uniting Church & Kindergarten Hall
- Type: State heritage (built)
- Designated: 2 April 1999
- Reference no.: 419
- Type: Church
- Category: Religion

The Uniting Church and Kindergarten Hall is a heritage-listed church building at 219255 Anson Street, Orange, City of Orange, New South Wales, Australia. It is also known as Wesley Uniting Church. The property is owned by the Uniting Church in Australia. It was added to the New South Wales State Heritage Register on 2 April 1999.

There is another Uniting Church in Orange in Kite Street called St John's.

== Heritage listing ==
The Uniting Church and Kindergarten Hall was listed on the New South Wales State Heritage Register on 2 April 1999.

== Gallery ==
Uniting Church & Kindergarten Hall
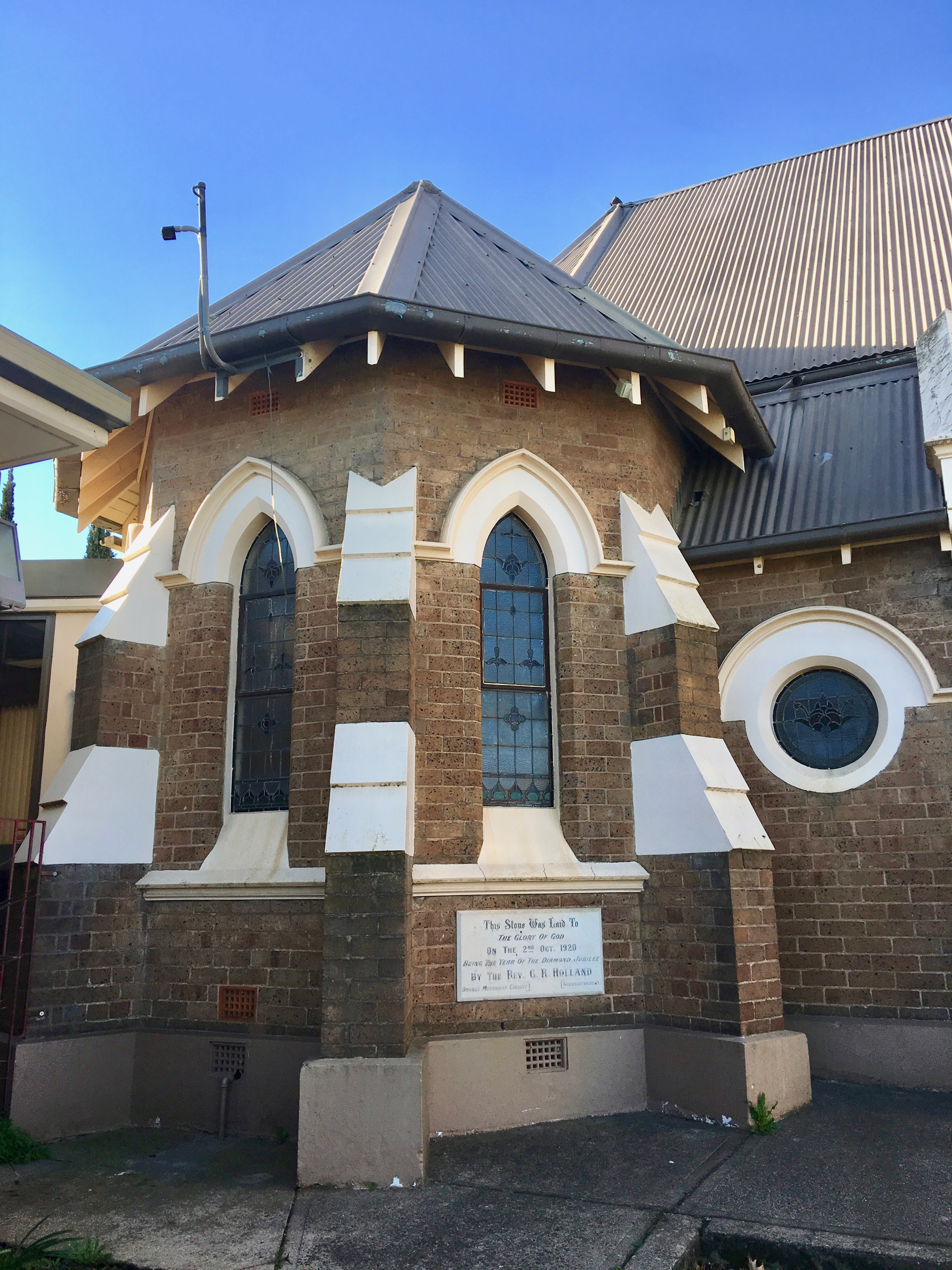
Uniting Church & Kindergarten Hall

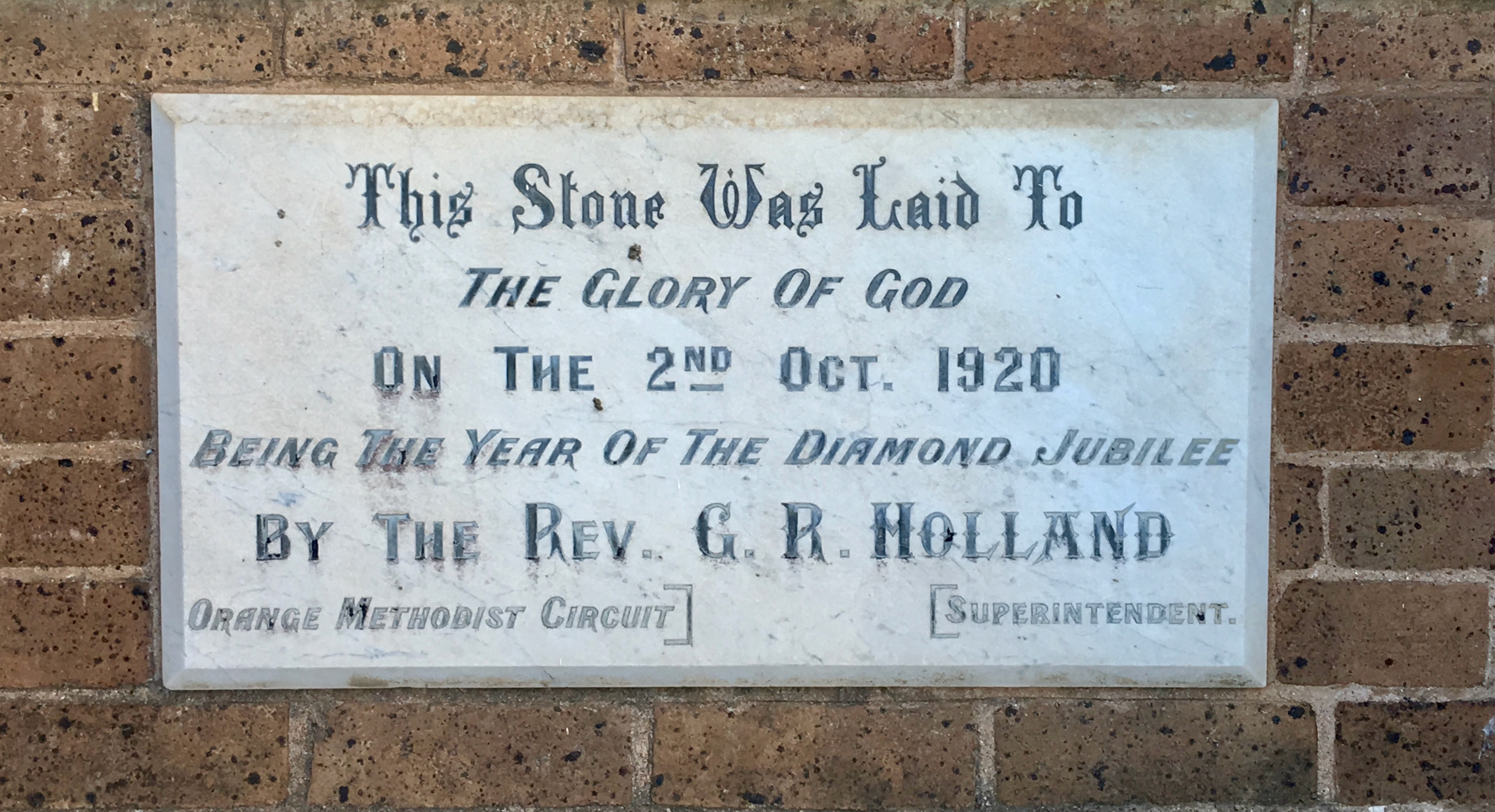
Dedication stone at Uniting Church & Kindergarten Hall

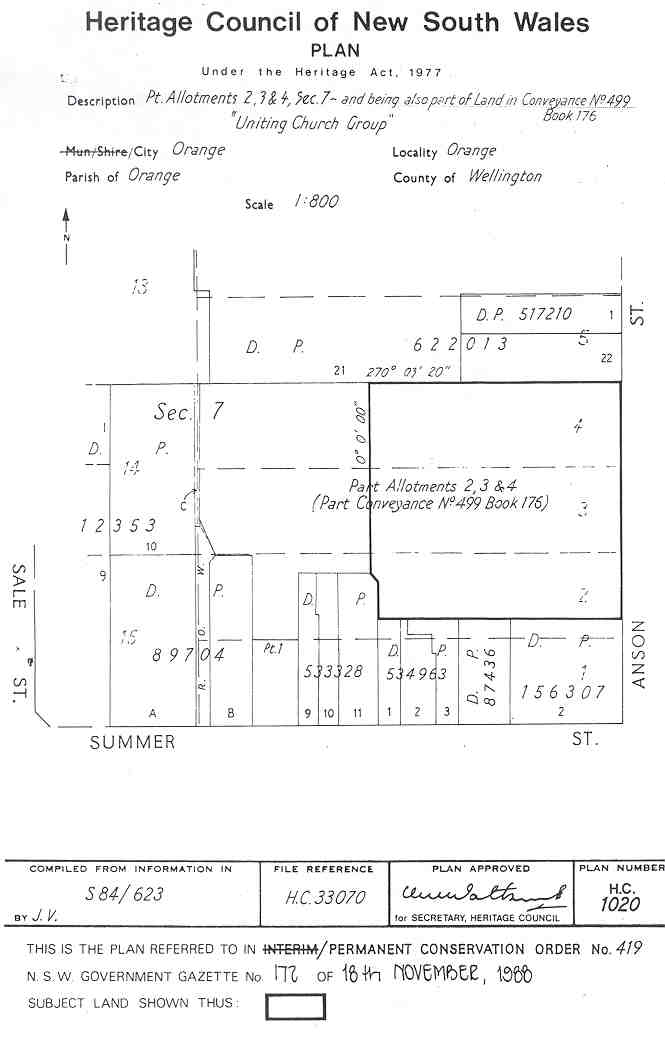
Heritage boundaries of Uniting Church & Kindergarten Hall
