= Union Bank of Australia building, Orange =

Union Bank of Australia building
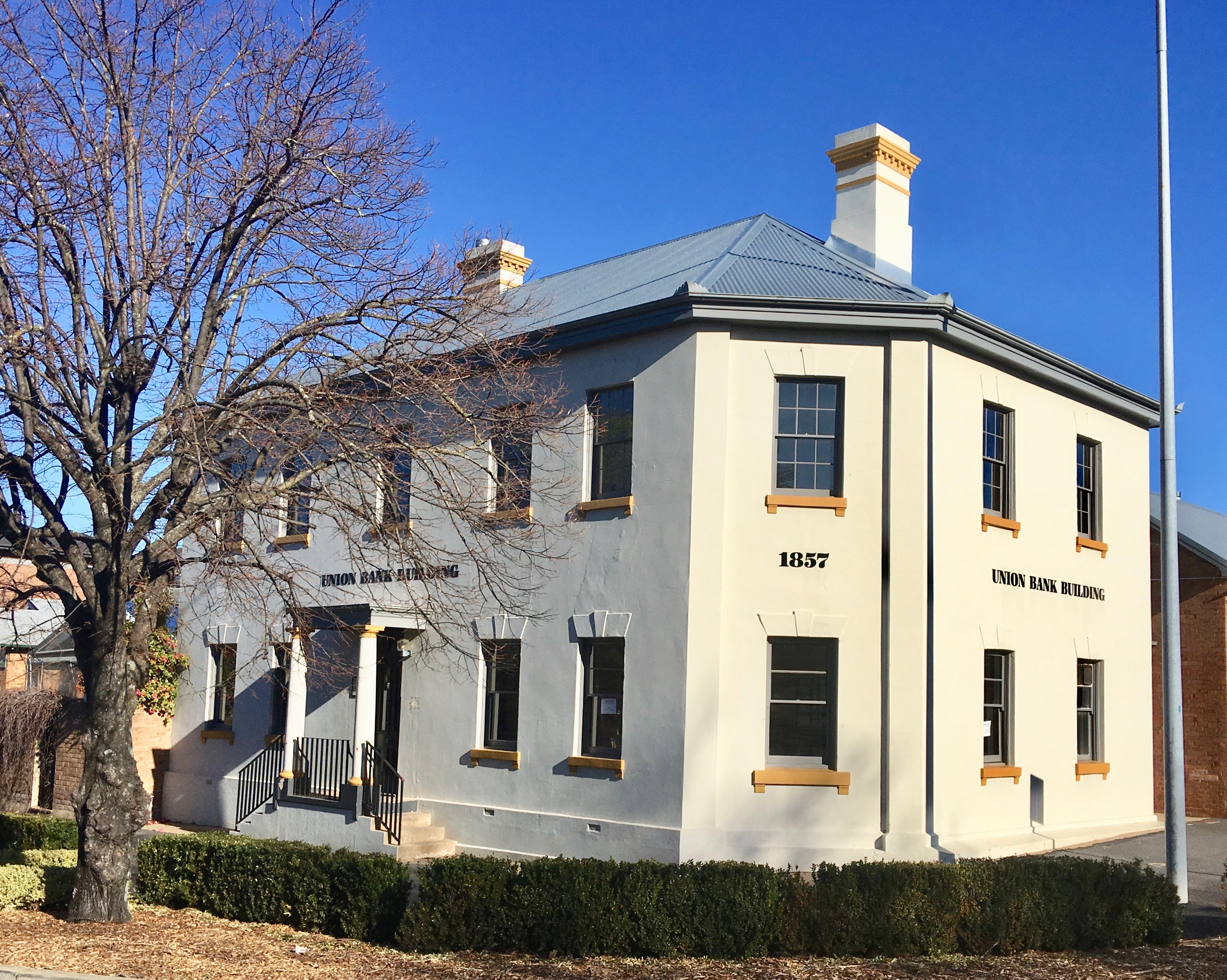
- Former Union Bank of Australia

- Location within New South Wales Location within Australia
- 33°16′53″S 149°05′49″E
- Location: 84 Byng Street, Orange, City of Orange, New South Wales, Australia

Site notes
- Owner: The Trustee for Union Bank Property Trust

New South Wales Heritage Register
- Official name: Union Bank of Australia (former); Weymouth House; Hesley Gallery
- Type: State heritage (built)
- Designated: 2 April 1999
- Reference no.: 230
- Type: Bank
- Category: Commercial

The Union Bank of Australia building is a heritage-listed former school and bank building and now offices and restaurant at 84 Byng Street, Orange, City of Orange, New South Wales, Australia. It is also known as Union Bank of Australia (former), Weymouth House and Hesley Gallery. The property is owned by The Trustee for Union Bank Property Trust (Private). It was added to the New South Wales State Heritage Register on 2 April 1999.

== History ==
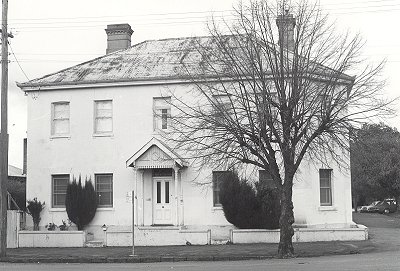
Union Bank of Australia Building

The Union Bank of Australia was established in Orange in 1857 in temporary premises and in 1858 opened in the present building. It was first bank in Orange. In April 1862 the business of the Union Bank was taken over by the Commercial Banking Company of Sydney. It would be after this year that the building was acquired and used as a police station. In 1874-75 buildings for the Police Department were under construction in Byng Street not far from the Court House.

It was after this date that Mr T. H. Richards conducted a school in this building called Weymouth House. In 1893 Mr Richards transferred his school and the building became a Girls School called Dombrane College. After closing as Queen's College in about 1911-12 the building then became a boarding house conducted by Miss Hawke and her mother. After the boarding school it was used as residential flats.

In February 1980 the Heritage Council was advised by the National Trust of Australia (NSW) that the Former Union Bank was under threat of demolition. A Section 130 Order was placed over the building on 29 February 1980. A formal notice under Section 132 was subsequently made by the owners of the building with the intention to demolish the building. After taking into consideration the views of Orange Council and the owners of the building an Interim Conservation Order was placed over the building on 18 April 1980 in an effort to find a suitable use for the building.

In August 1980 the Department of Public Works inspected the property and advised the building was significant for its historic and streetscape value and was suitable for re-use as professional offices or residential/commercial use. In 1981 the property was sold and a loan and grant was made available to the owners for the restoration of the building. On 11 February 1983 a Permanent Conservation Order was placed over the property.

It was transferred to the State Heritage Register on 2 April 1999.

== Description ==
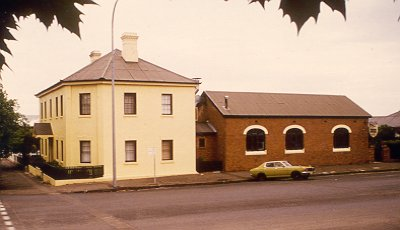
Building with classroom attached

The building comprises a two-storey rendered brick and iron-roofed main building with a later single-storey brick classroom or hall at the rear, added during the period of school occupancy of the building and perhaps contemporary with the Federation style porch of timber construction added to shelter the principal entry to the main building. Outbuildings at the rear include a separate kitchen-house and a stables block with later garage addition, the latter original internal details such as the horse "boxes" and wooden cobble floors.

The bank building proper is of simple and austere Victorian styling, its facade enlivened only by decorative lintels, keystones and sills to the window openings. Internally the building is also very simply and economically fitted with none of the elaboration usually found in major commercial premises of the period. Original doors, architraves and skirtings, fireplace surrounds and main staircase survive but are simple and basic in design.

=== Modifications and dates ===
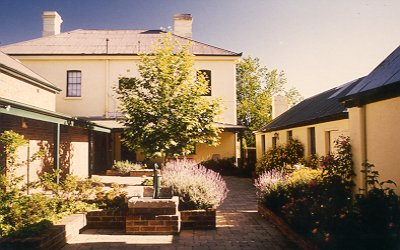
Rear view

The following modifications have been made to site:

- 1858 – main two-storey building constructed
- 1880s – single storey building at rear constructed
- 1981 – Heritage Council approval given for conversion and restoration of buildings
- 1983 – Heritage Council approval given for use of ground floor for restaurant purposes
- 1985 – Heritage Council approval given for the stratification into 3 titles ad change of use of the property
- 1988 – Heritage Council approval given for new fire escape, firehose reel, exit lights and emergency lighting
- 1992 – Heritage Council approval given for replacement of portico, and interior alterations.

== Heritage listing ==
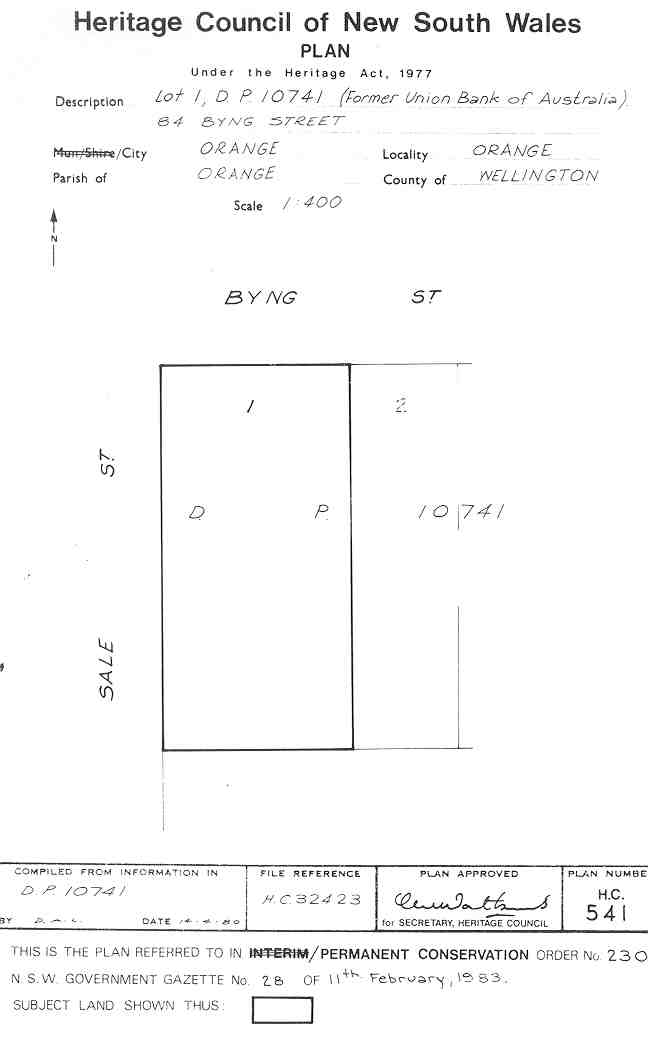
Heritage boundaries

Opened in 1858 by the Union Bank of Australia it has historic significance as the first bank of Orange. The former Union Bank building is of simple and austere Victorian styling, its facade enlivened only by decorative lintels, keystones and sills to the window openings. Situated on a corner it makes a positive architectural contribution to the street. (Heritage Office files)

The Orange branch of the Union Bank of Australia was listed on the New South Wales State Heritage Register on 2 April 1999 having satisfied the following criteria.

The place is important in demonstrating the course, or pattern, of cultural or natural history in New South Wales.

Opened in 1858 by the Union Bank of Australia it has historic significance as the first bank of Orange. (Heritage Office files)

The place is important in demonstrating aesthetic characteristics and/or a high degree of creative or technical achievement in New South Wales.

The former Union Bank building is of simple and austere Victorian styling, its facade enlivened only by decorative lintels, keystones and sills to the window openings. Situated on a corner it makes a positive architectural contribution to the street. (Heritage Office files)

== See also ==
- Australian non-residential architectural styles
