= Berrilea =

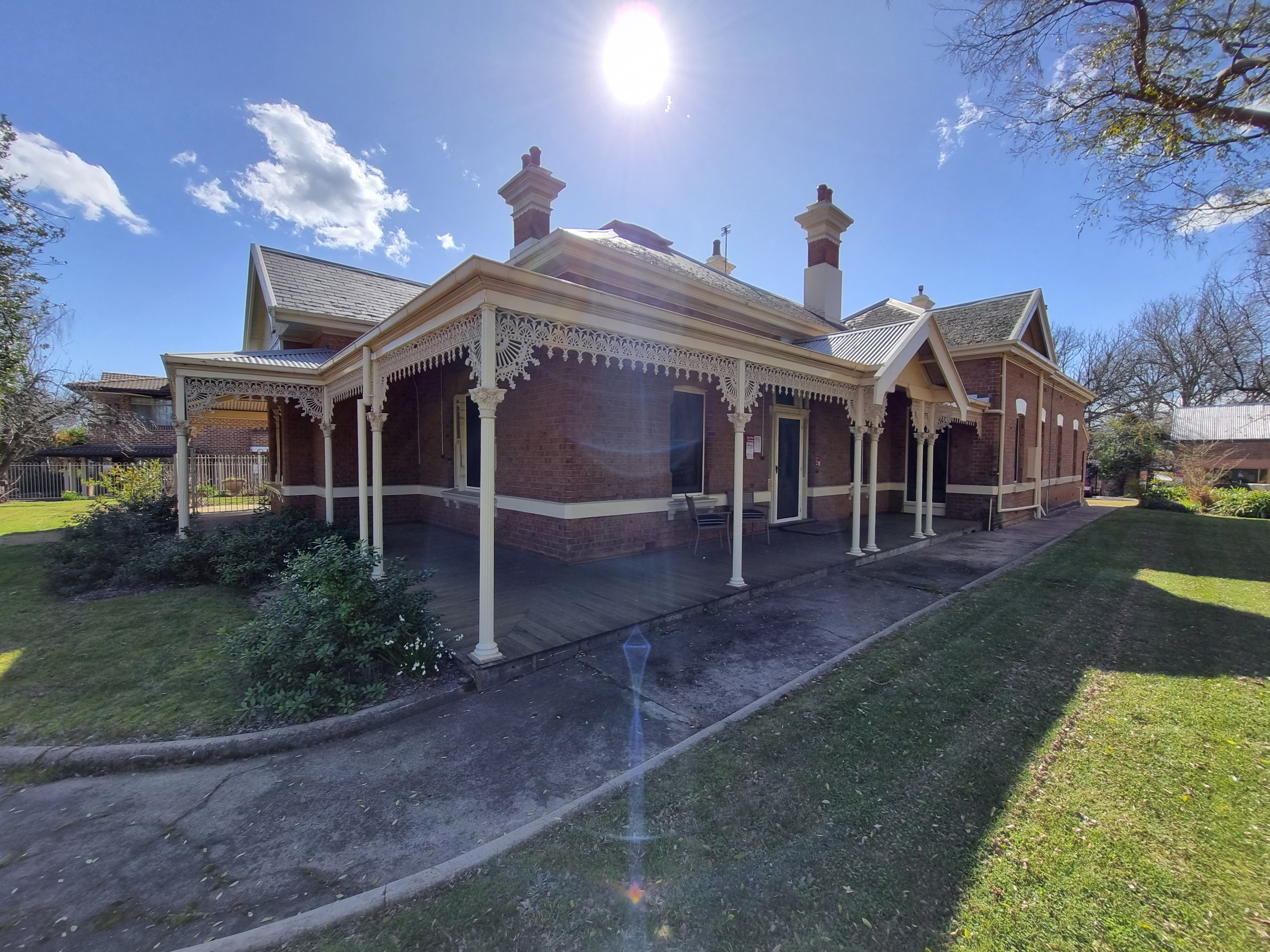

- Location within New South Wales Location within Australia
- 33°16′54″S 149°05′24″E
- Location: 29 Summer Street, Orange, City of Orange, New South Wales, Australia

History
- Built: 1902
- Built for: Mrs Robert Frost

Site notes
- Architect: John Job (J. J.) Copeman
- Architectural style: Edwardian
- Owner: Uniting Church in Australia

New South Wales Heritage Register
- Official name: Berrilea; Berrilee; Tabratong
- Type: State heritage (built)
- Designated: 2 April 1999
- Reference no.: 361
- Type: House
- Category: Residential buildings (private)
- Builders: J H Gain

Berrilea is a heritage-listed residence at 29 Summer Street, Orange in the Central West region of New South Wales, Australia. It was designed by John Job (J. J.) Copeman and built by J. H. Gain. It is also known as Berrilee and Tabratong. The property is owned by the Uniting Church in Australia. It was added to the New South Wales State Heritage Register on 2 April 1999.

== History ==
The house was designed by J. J. Copeman and built by J. H. Gain for Mrs Robert Frost in 1902.

Being located in the main street of the town, opposite Cook Park, it is a key domestic architectural element in the townscape of Orange. Its location, landscape setting and high architectural quality indicate its importance.

The house was first owned by Robert Frost (a major local brick-maker), and eventually was bought by P. C. Weston, whose daughter Miss F. Weston left it to the church for use in association with the adjacent Wontoma Private Hospital. Its bathroom was modified in the 1930s.

Miss Weston became a patient in the nursing home in 1980 until her death on 14 December 1981.

In 1983 Berrilea cottage bequeathed to the Uniting Church. The church's Wontama Village Nursing Home has been operating on parts of the site since 1967. The home (cottage) was initially considered for self-contained flats, but in May 1987 it became the Wontama Day Care Centre and incorporated the administration office. 24 self-contained units called "Carinya" (Happy home)') were opened in 1991. 1990 plans of the Wontama site show the proposed use of Berrilea as a day therapy centre, a use which did not eventuate at the location of the former stables. Another plan from 1990 approved by the Heritage Council was for demolition of the former tack room at the north of the stables to construct the Wontama Workshop.

Orange City Council listed Berrilea on its Local Environmental Plan in 2011 as an item of state heritage significance.

== Description ==
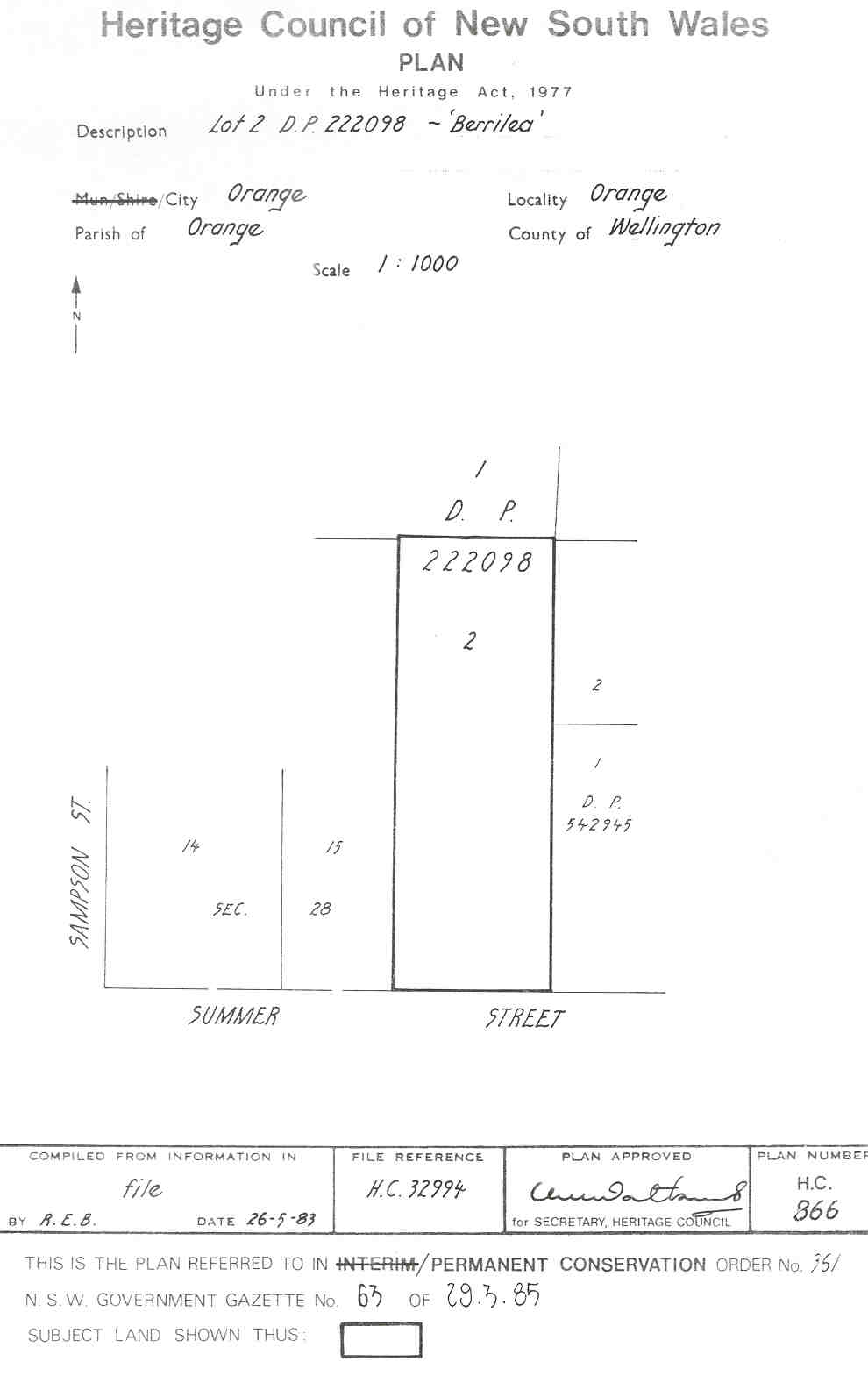
Berrilea, Orange, New South Wales, Australia

The Edwardian house has wide wooden verandahs, external lacework and a large formal garden and includes stables at rear (now a double garage). The house is a particularly fine example of Edwardian architecture with excellent external detailing. Being located in the main street of the town, opposite Cook Park, it is a key domestic architectural element in the townscape of Orange. Its location, landscape setting and high architectural quality indicate its importance. The house is set in a peaceful shadowy garden with large trees. Curtilage to be the lot boundary.

The house was designed by J. J. Copeman and built by J. H. Gain in 1902. It is of tuckpointed Flemish bond brick with a hipped slate roof, moulded chimneys and projecting roughcast gable. The verandah to three sides has cast iron corinthian columns and excellent decorative cast iron brackets and valances. It has a straight-pitched iron roof and a gabled portico above the main door. Windows have moulded brackets and there is a rendered string course at sill height. The front door has leadlighting, and three french doors open onto the verandah. Other than a few alterations such as the 1930s bathroom and the fireplaces in the drawing room and dining room, the interior layout and detail remain in substantially original condition.

The stables at the rear (now a double garage) are of plain brick like the house with a timber extension at the back. They are in fair condition. A tankstand on very high piers is attached to the stables – it is still used in drought. The house in made of Flemish bond brick, with tuckpointing, slate roof, cast iron, leadlighting, and timber.

=== Modifications and dates ===
In 1983 Berrilea cottage was bequeathed to the Uniting Church. Wontama Village Nursing Home has been operating on parts of the site since 1967.

== Heritage listing ==
Berrilea was listed on the New South Wales State Heritage Register on 2 April 1999.

== See also ==
- Australian residential architectural styles
