= Suma Park Dam =

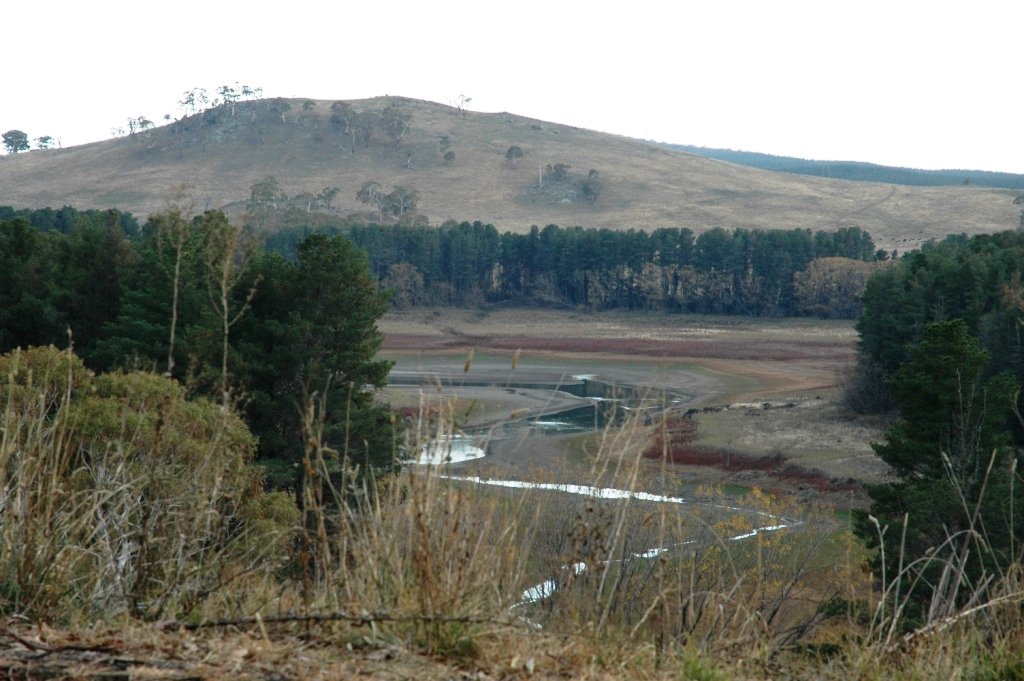
- Suma Park Reservoir, viewed from Icley Road

- Location of the Suma Park Dam in New South Wales
- Country: Australia
- Location: Central West, New South Wales
- Coordinates: 33°16′54″S 149°08′04″E
- Purpose: Water supply
- Status: Operational
- Opening date: 1962
- Operator: Orange City Council

Dam and spillways
- Type of dam: Arch dam
- Impounds: Summer Hill Creek
- Height: 31 metres (102 ft)
- Length: 208 metres (682 ft)
- Width (crest): 2.4 metres (7 ft 10 in)
- Dam volume: 18 cubic metres (640 cu ft)
- Spillways: 1
- Spillway capacity: 260 cubic metres per second (9,200 cu ft/s)

Reservoir
- Creates: Suma Park Reservoir
- Total capacity: 17,290 megalitres (611×10^{6} cu ft)
- Catchment area: 179 square kilometres (69 sq mi)
- Surface area: 1.3 square kilometres (0.50 sq mi)
- Website watersecurity.orange.nsw.gov.au

Suma Park Dam is a concrete arch dam across the Summer Hill Creek in the central west region of New South Wales, Australia. The main purpose of the dam is to supply potable water to the city of Orange. The impounded reservoir is called Suma Park Reservoir.

== Location and features ==
The dam is located 4 kilometres (2.5 mi) east of Orange; with the secondary water source, Spring Creek Reservoir, located to the south-east of Orange. Built in 1962, Suma Park Dam is owned and maintained by Orange City Council. Prior to the construction of Suma Park Dam, Lake Canobolas (then known as Meadow Creek Dam) on the Molong Creek was also used as a domestic water source.

The Suma Park Dam 18 cubic metres (640 cu ft) concrete wall is 31 metres (102 ft) high and the arch crest is 208 metres (682 ft) long, with a crest width of 2.4 metres (7 ft 10 in). At 100% capacity the dam wall holds back 17,290 megalitres (611×10^{6} cu ft) of water. The surface area of Suma Park Reservoir is 1.3 square kilometres (0.50 sq mi) and the catchment area is 179 square kilometres (69 sq mi). The uncontrolled 62 metres (203 ft) spillway is capable of discharging 260 cubic metres per second (9,200 cu ft/s).

=== Upgrade ===
Surveillance and dam safety inspections are conducted regularly by the Orange City Council. In 2005 and 2010, the dam overflowed. In 2011, the Council published a report giving options for raising the height of the dam.

== See also ==
- List of dams and reservoirs in New South Wales
