= Lake Canobolas =

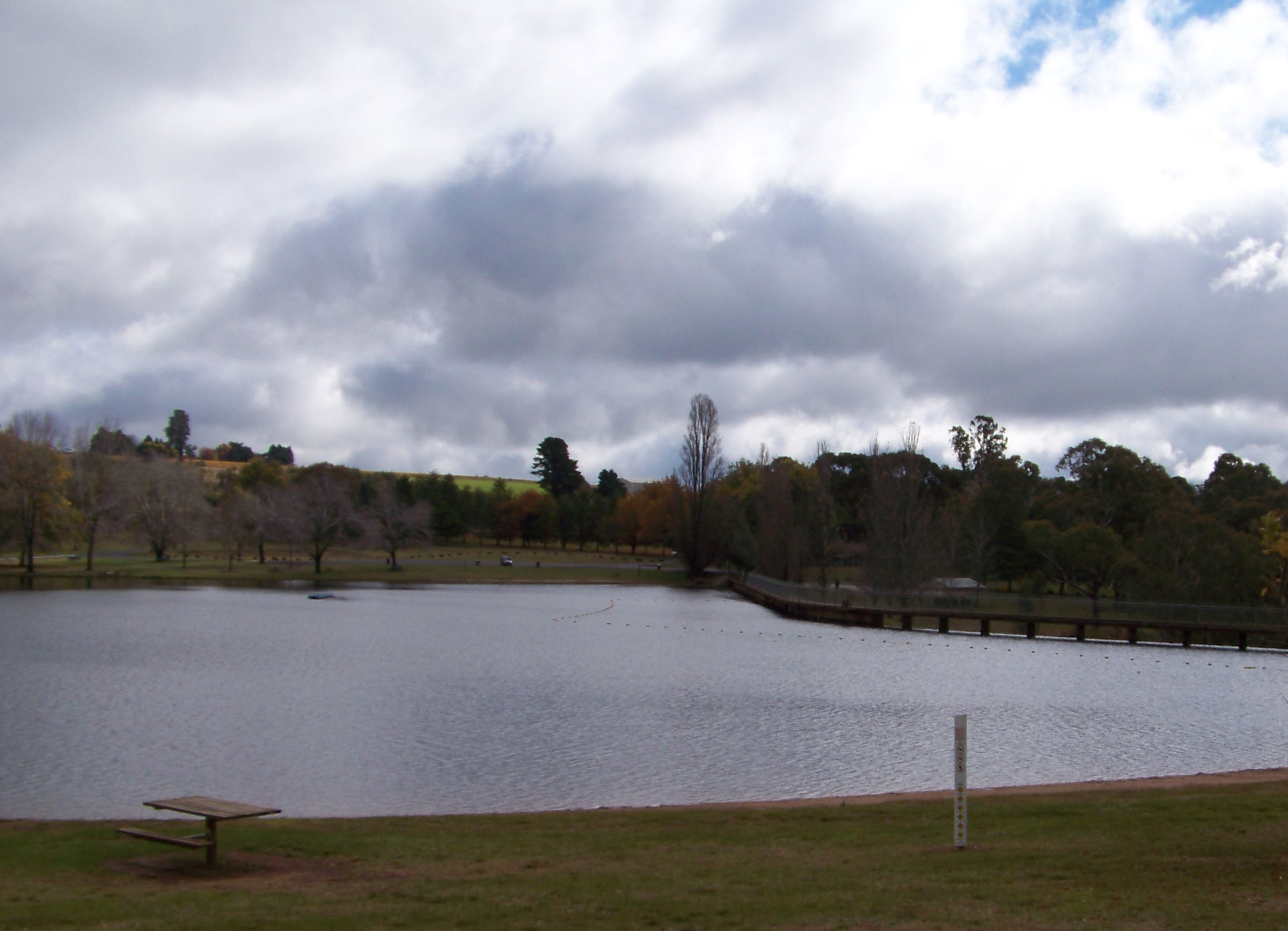
- View of Lake Canobolas from its eastern shore, looking towards the dam wall, 2011.

- Location within New South Wales
- Location: Orange, New South Wales
- Coordinates: 33°18′17″S 149°1′40″E
- Type: Man-made reservoir
- Primary inflows: Molong Creek
- Primary outflows: Molong Creek
- Catchment area: 450 megalitres (16×10^{6} cu ft)
- Basin countries: Australia
- Managing agency: Orange City Council
- Built: 1916
- First flooded: 1918

Lake Canobolas is a man-made reservoir located near Orange, in the central west region of New South Wales, Australia. Completed in the early 1900s, between 1918 and 1957 the lake supplied water to Orange and since the 1970s has been used for recreation purposes.

== Location and features ==
Lake Canobolas, formerly known as Meadow Creek Dam across the Molong Creek, is approximately 10 kilometres (6.2 mi) to the southwest of Orange, below Mount Canobolas, an extinct volcano and one of the highest peaks between the Blue Mountains and Perth. Between 1918 and 1957, the dam was managed by Canobolas Shire Council and used for water supply to the town of Orange. Since that time the administration of the area surrounding Lake Canobolas and the dam were taken over by the Orange City Council and were developed for recreational purposes. The area of 103 hectares (250 acres) now comprises the lake, an earth sanctuary, a nature reserve, and a Scout Camp and lies within the Cabonne Shire.

Since 1962, the main water supply for Orange is sourced from Suma Park Dam on the eastern side of Orange.

The name of the lake is derived from the Aboriginal words coona, meaning shoulder and booloo meaning two. It was used by the Wiradjuri to refer to the twin peaks, now known as Old Man Canobolas and Young Man Canobolas.

The Lake is regularly used by Colour City Dragons and Pinnacle Paddlers- dragon boat clubs. The area is also used by the Orange Triathlon Club and Goldseekers Orienteering Club for Park foot orienteering.
