= City of Orange (New South Wales) =

- Local government area
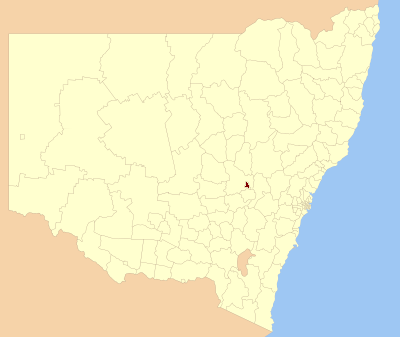
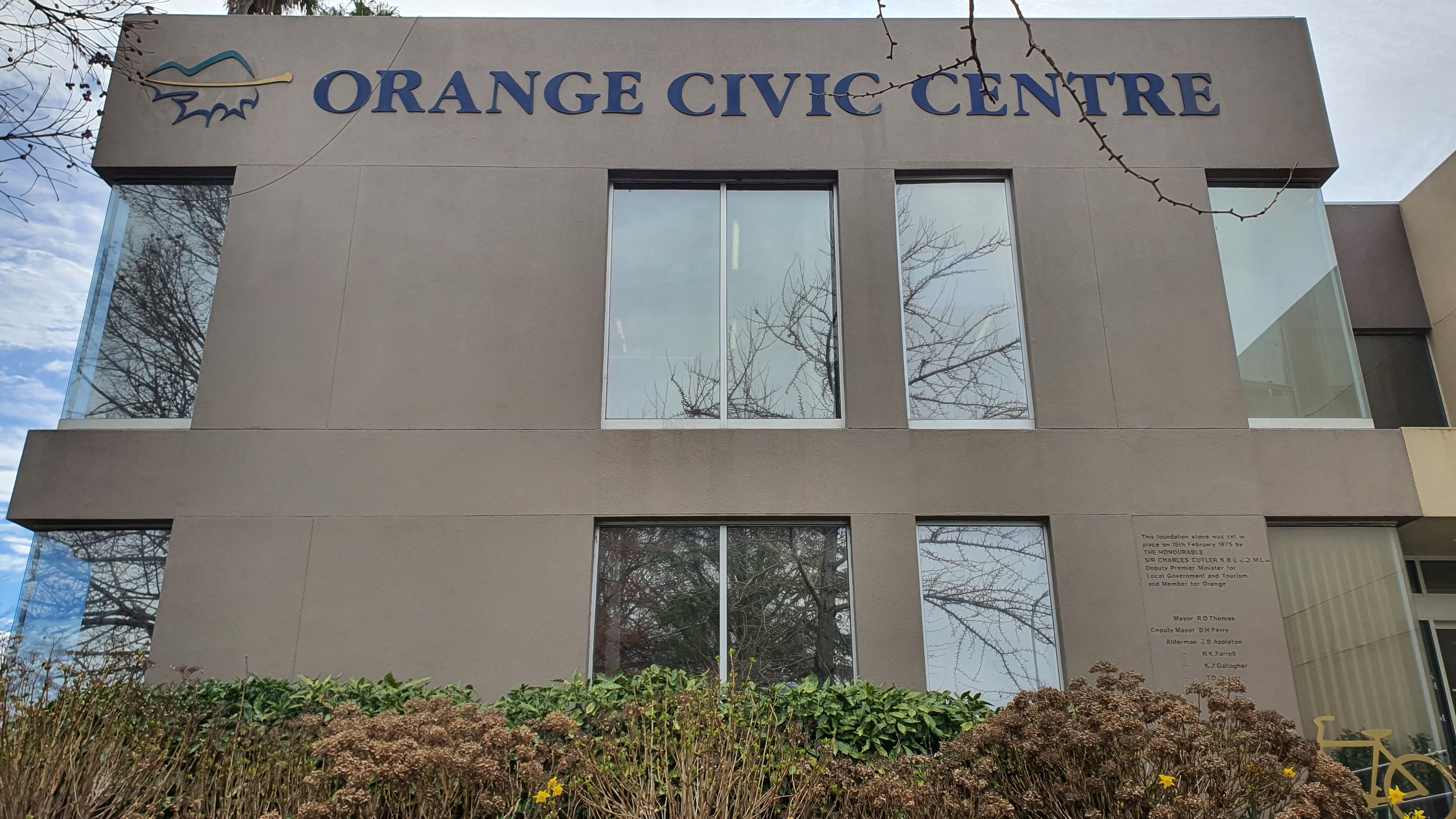
- Location in New South Wales Orange Civic Centre

- Interactive map of City of Orange
- Coordinates: 33°17′S 149°06′E
- Country: Australia
- State: New South Wales
- Region: Central West
- Established: 9 January 1860
- Council seat: Orange

Government
  - Mayor: Tony Miletto (Independent)
  - State electorate: Orange
  - Federal division: Calare

Area
  - Total: 285 km^{2} (110 sq mi)

Population
  - Total: 43,512 (LGA 2021)
- Website: City of Orange
LGAs around City of Orange
Cabonne	Dubbo Regional	Mid-Western
Cabonne	City of Orange	Bathurst
Cowra	Blayney

The City of Orange is a local government area in the Central West region of New South Wales, Australia. Based in Orange, the area is located adjacent to the Mitchell Highway and the Main Western railway line.

== Suburbs and localities ==
=== Suburbs of Orange ===
- Bletchington
- Bloomfield
- Bowen
- Calare
- Canobolas
- Clifton Grove
- Glenroi
- Narrambla
- Orange East
- Orange South
- Suma Park
- Summer Hill
- Warrendine

=== Other localities ===
- Huntley
- Lucknow
- March
- Shadforth
- Spring Creek
- Spring Hill
- Springside

== Heritage listings ==
The City of Orange has a number of heritage-listed sites, including:

- 4570–4578 Mitchell Highway, Lucknow: Wentworth and Reform Gold Mines
- 219–255 Anson Street, Orange: Uniting Church and Kindergarten Hall
- 3–25 Bathurst Road, Orange: Bowen Terrace
- 84 Byng Street, Orange: Union Bank of Australia building
- Forest Road, Orange: Bloomfield Hospital
- Peisley Street, Orange: Orange railway station
- 24–26 Summer Street, Orange: Cook Park
- 29 Summer Street, Orange: Berrilea
- 221 Summer Street, Orange: Orange Post Office
- Woodward Street, Orange: Duntryleague

== Council history ==
Situated on Blackman's Swamp Creek, Orange was proclaimed a village in 1846 and the local parish was named by the Surveyor General, Major Sir Thomas Mitchell, in honour of Prince William of Orange, whom had been an associate of in the Peninsular War, when both were aides-de-camp to the Duke of Wellington, whose title was bestowed on the valley to the west by John Oxley. Much of the town's subsequent growth and development in the early years was due to the discovery of gold in 1851 at Ophir and Lucknow. The resulting gold rush attracted a wide range of people and business to the district, many of whom settled in the region and developed a strong agricultural industry, particularly in the growing of wheat and barley.

Orange was first incorporated on 9 January 1860 when the Municipality of Orange was proclaimed. The first election for a six-member council was held on 9 February 1860, with John Peisley elected as the first chairman. The first meeting of the council was held at the Court House on 18 February 1860, with George Dolquhorn appointed as the first Town Clerk.

This new council fell into controversy within a few years however, with the legality of the council constitution questioned in 1866 and the council suspended by order of the Supreme Court of New South Wales. With the Municipalities Act 1867, the Council was reconstituted and a new council was elected on 14 February 1868. In 1888, the Municipality of East Orange was proclaimed and merged with the Orange Municipality on 24 December 1912.

Orange was proclaimed a City on 19 July 1946 when its population was over 15,000. On 1 October 1977, the City of Orange was extended in area to 298 km2 when parts of the surrounding shires of Cabonne, Blayney, and Lyndhurst were transferred to the City of Orange.

=== 2016–17 amalgamation proposal ===
A 2015 review of local government boundaries recommended that the City of Orange merge with the Cabonne Shire and Blayney Shire Councils to form a new council with an area of 7,833 square kilometres (3,024 sq mi) and support a population of approximately 63,000. Despite originally planning for the amalgamation to go ahead, the merger scheduled for May 2016 was delayed due to legal action, and in February 2017 the NSW Government decided not to proceed with the amalgamation.

== Council ==
=== Current composition and election method ===
Orange City Council is composed of eleven councillors elected proportionally as a single ward. All councillors are elected for a fixed four-year term of office. The mayor is elected directly by a popular vote. A referendum was held on 8 September 2012 and an absolute majority of voters resolved in favour to directly-elect the mayor, which took effect from the 2017 election. The most recent election was held on 14 September 2024. The makeup of the council is as follows:

Party	Councillors
Independents and Unaligned	10
Labor	1
The Greens	1
Total	12

The current Council, elected in 2024, is:

Mayor	Party	Notes
Tony Mileto	Independent	Mayor, 2024–present. Councillor since 2017.
Councillor	Party	Notes
Kevin Duffy	Independent	Elected 2012.
Marea Ruddy	Independent	Elected 2024.
Tammy Greenhalgh	Independent	Elected 2021. Deputy Mayor, 2024–present.
Jeffery Whitton	Labor	
Steven Peterson	Independent	Elected 2021.
Frances Kinghorne	Independent	Elected 2021.
Gerald Power	Independent	Elected 2021. Deputy Mayor, 2022–2024.
Graeme Judge	Independent	Elected 2024.
Jamie Stedman	Independent	Elected 2024.
Melanie McDonald	Independent	Elected 2021.
David Mallard	Greens	Elected 2021.

== Election results ==
=== 2024 ===
2024 New South Wales local elections: Orange
Party	Candidate	Votes	%	±%
Independent (Group C)	1. Tony Mileto (elected mayor); 2. Marea Ruddy (elected 2); 3. Jamie Stedman (elected 9); 4. Bernadette Wood; 5. Tony Pearson; 6. Brett Hazzard	4,006	16.7	+0.7
Independent (Group B)	1. Kevin Duffy (elected 1); 2. Graeme Judge (elected 11); 3. Fleur Vardanega; 4. Darren Johnson; 5. Richard Clifford; 6. Bradley Tyack	3,651	15.2	+5.3
Independent (Group F)	1. Tammy Greenhalgh (elected 4); 2. Craig Harvey; 3. Paris Papell; 4. Holly Whitaker; 5. Jason Lyne; 6. Melissa Hamling	2,917	12.2	−1.1
Independent (Group J)	1. Steven Peterson (elected 3); 2. Warwick Baines; 3. Theodore Crane; 4. Andrew Greig; 5. Michael O'Mara; 6. Nathan Sutherland; 7. Anthony Solari	2,853	11.9	+1.5
Labor	1. Jeff Whitton (elected 5); 2. Heather Dunn; 3. Addam Parish; 4. Jack Carden; 5. Charles Ginty; 6. Julie Cunningham	2,049	8.6	+1.1
Orange Residents and Ratepayers Association (Group K)	1. Frances Kinghorne (elected 6); 2. Paula Townsend; 3. Eunice Adetifa; 4. Salvatore Sciuto; 5. Thomas McCann; 6. Patrick Raftery	1,914	8.0	+2.1
Independent (Group G)	1. Gerald Power (elected 7); 2. Tabitha McBurney; 3. Ben Benton; 4. Glenda Bell; 5. Elizabeth Seccombe; 6. Michael Seccombe	1,844	7.7	+4.1
Independent (Group D)	1. Melanie McDonell (elected 8); 2. Ken Freedman; 3. Ben Bartlett; 4. Chris Stanger; 5. Granton Smith; 6. Kate Curtin	1,786	7.5	−0.4
Greens	1. David Mallard (elected 10); 2. Sue Clarke; 3. Jenny Pratten; 4. Ben Parker; 5. Liz Murrell; 6. Haidee Edwards	1,560	6.5	−2.7
Independent (Group A)	1. Glenn Floyd; 2. Gary Sanders; 3. Kristen Hopcraft; 4. Brock Anderson; 5. William Moran; 6. Peter Whelan	733	3.1	−9.2
Independent (Group H)	1. James Newman; 2. Jason Wright; 3. Beverley Williams; 4. Annette Steele; 5. Jannene Geoghegan; 6. Azra Nurkic	640	2.7	
Total formal votes		23,953	92.3	
Informal votes		2,000	7.7	
Turnout		25,953	84.3	

=== 2021 ===
Elected councillor	Party
Tony Mileto	For Our Future
Jack Evans	For Our Future
Tammy Greenhalgh	Team Hamling
Glenn Floyd	SFF
Steven Peterson	Refresh Orange
Kevin Duffy	Independent (Group F)
David Mallard	Greens
Melanie McDonell	McDonell Team
Jeff Whitton	Ind. Labor
Frances Kinghorne	ORRAP
Gerald Power	Independent (Group I)

2021 New South Wales local elections: Orange
Party	Candidate	Votes	%	±%
For Our Future		3,786	15.9	
Team Hamling		3,155	13.3	
Shooters, Fishers, Farmers		2,928	12.3	
Refresh Orange		2,469	10.4	
Independent (Group F)		2,351	9.9	
Greens		2,185	9.2	
McDonell Team		1,870	7.9	
Independent Labor		1,786	7.5	
Orange Residents and Ratepayers Association		1,408	5.9	
Independent (Group I)		846	3.6	
Independent	Amanda Spalding	347	1.5	
Independent	Geoff Naughton	266	1.1	
Independent	Lesley Smith	192	0.8	
Independent	Scott Munro	105	0.4	
Independent	Josh Girle-Bennett	46	0.2	
Total formal votes		23,740	93.4	
Informal votes		1,684	6.6	
Turnout		25,424	84.4	
