= Parish of Eurimbula =

Eurimbula, New South Wales is a civil parish of Gordon County, New South Wales, a Cadastral divisions of New South Wales.

Eurimbula, New South Wales is on the Bell River between Molong, New South Wales and Wellington, New South Wales and the Molong–Dubbo railway line passes through the parish.
