= Parish of The Gap =

The Gap Parish is a civil parish of Gordon County, New South Wales, a Cadastral divisions of New South Wales.

The Gap Parish is between Molong, New South Wales and Wellington, New South Wales and the (inactive) Molong–Dubbo railway line passes through the parish, The parish is on the Bell River.

== See also ==
- The Gap, New South Wales
