= Parish of Ganoo =

Ganoo is a civil parish of Gordon County, New South Wales. a Cadastral divisions of New South Wales.

There are no towns in the parish though Walmer railway station, New South Wales on the (now disused) Molong–Dubbo railway line is within the parish. The nearest village is Yeoval, New South Wales and the Nearest Larger town is Wellington, New South Wales to the north.
