= Parish of Buckinbah =

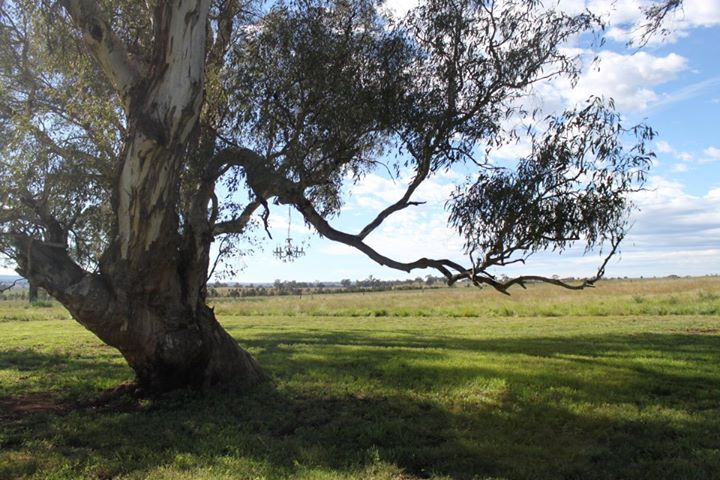
Buckinbah, Yeoval NSW in Spring

Buckinbah Parish is a civil parish of Gordon County, New South Wales, a Cadastral divisions of New South Wales.

== Location ==
The Parish is between Molong, New South Wales and Wellington, New South Wales and the (inactive) Molong–Dubbo railway line passes through the parish, The only town of the parish is Yeoval, New South Wales though a siding is located at Yallundry.

== History ==
Buckinbah parish is named for Buckinbah Station, the first home to Banjo Paterson.

In 1868, gold, silver and copper were discovered in Buckinbah.
