= Parish of Burgoon =

Burgoon Parish is a civil parish of Gordon County, New South Wales, a Cadastral divisions of New South Wales.

Burgoon Parish is between Molong, New South Wales and Wellington, New South Wales and the (inactive) Molong–Dubbo railway line passes through the parish, The Burgoon Creek flows through the parish.
