= Parish of Gundy =

Civil parish of Gordon County, Wales

Gundy Parish is a civil parish of Gordon County, New South Wales. a Cadastral divisions of New South Wales.

The parish is on the Macquarie River at the confluence with the Bell River and the only town in the parish is (West) Wellington, New South Wales. the nearest town.

Arthurville railway station on the (now disused) Molong–Dubbo railway line is in the parish.
