= Dundullimal Homestead =

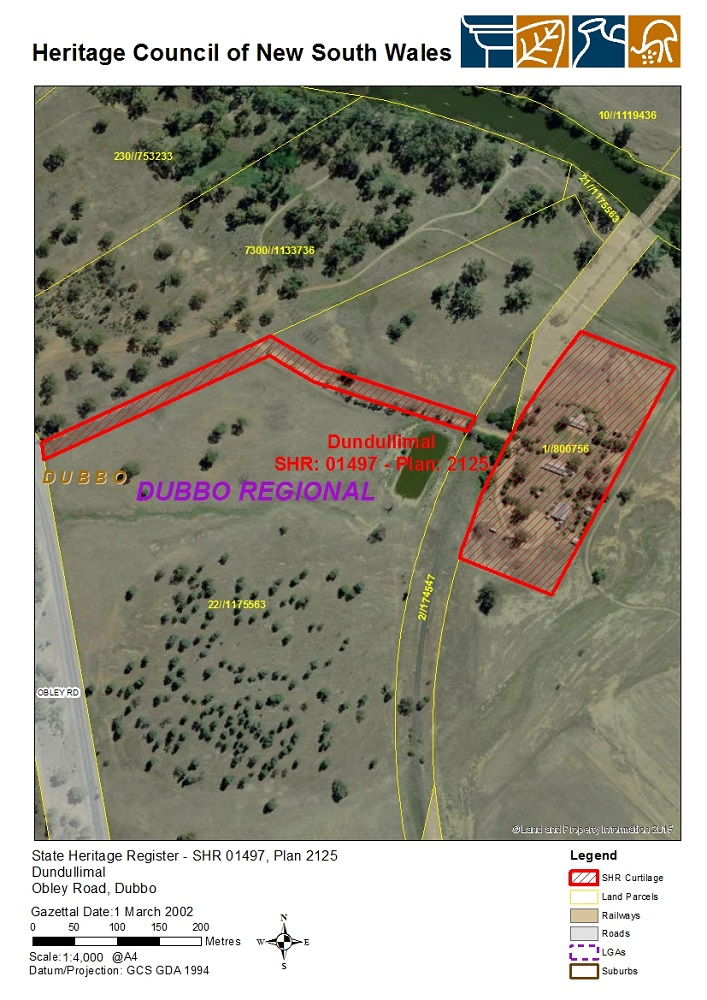
- Heritage boundaries

- Location in New South Wales

General information
- Status: Completed
- Type: Slab hut
- Architectural style: Old Colonial
- Location: 23 Obley Road, Dubbo, Dubbo Regional Council, New South Wales, Australia
- Coordinates: 32°17′05″S 148°36′16″E
- Completed: c. 1842
- Owner: National Trust of Australia, NSW Branch

Design and construction
- Architect: John Maughan

Website
- Dundullimal Homestead at the National Trust of Australia

New South Wales Heritage Register
- Official name: Dundullimal; Dundullimal Homestead
- Type: state heritage (complex / group)
- Designated: 1 March 2002
- Reference no.: 1497
- Type: Homestead Complex
- Category: Farming and Grazing
- Builders: John Maughan

Register of the National Estate
- Official name: Dundullimal Homestead and Stone Barn
- Type: Historic
- Criteria: A.4, B.2, F.1
- Designated: 30 June 1992
- Reference no.: 18215

Dundullimal Homestead is a heritage-listed former pastoral station and now cultural facility, house museum and events centre. The Australian colonial slab hut-type homestead is located approximately 7 kilometres (4.3 mi) south of Dubbo in the Orana region of New South Wales, on the bank of the Macquarie River. Dundillimal Homestead is believed to be the oldest surviving slab hut house in Australia. It was built in c. 1842 by John Maughan and is owned by National Trust of Australia, NSW branch. It was added to the New South Wales State Heritage Register on 1 March 2002, and is listed on the (now defunct) Register of the National Estate.

The homestead is located two kilometres (one point two miles) further than Western Plains Zoo on Obley Road. Driving time is approximately eight minutes from the Dubbo central business district, and the property can also be accessed via the Tracker Riley cycle way. The building is administered by the National Trust and has become a major and significant tourist attraction in the Dubbo area, attracting large numbers of visitors from all around the country. The Homestead is open to the public three days a week and is often booked as a venue for weddings, art exhibitions, concerts and parties.

== History ==
In 1826, Governor Darling established an area known as the "limits of location", outside which settlement was not permitted. This area comprised 19 counties stretching from north of the Hunter Valley to Yass in the south and west to Wellington. Squatters, however, took their stock beyond these limits, taking up large tracts of land.

In 1836 in an attempt to control this occupation, licences were granted to "de-pasture" beyond the limits of location. The licences were renewable each year and the squatters had no legal rights to any particular tract of land. The "runs" they occupied were determined by agreement amongst themselves. The colony beyond the limits of location was divided into nine squatting districts. Dundullimal Run is situated in what was the Wellington Squatting District which lay between the Lachlan and Macquarie Rivers. In 1848 following pressure from these licensees to have security of tenure, regulations were passed which granted leases of eight or fourteen years, depending on the district. At the end of the lease the occupying tenant could purchase land under pre-emptive right.

The Robertson Land Act of 1861 opened up all Crown Lands including the leased area to free selection before survey and reduced the tenure of the pastoral leases. Lease holders also purchased portions of their runs under the provisions of this Act.

The Crown Lands Act of 1884 required that each pastoral holding (as a run was now called) be divided into a "leasehold area" and a "resumed area". While maintaining the principle of free selection before survey, the Act gave fixity of tenure to the pastoral leases. Hence the resumed area was available for selection though it could be occupied under licence by the lessee of the pastoral holding until such time as it was selected. In 1895 an Act was passed which converted the leasehold area to a resumed area on the expiry of the pastoral lease. However, the holder could continue occupation by acquiring a preferential occupation licence.

== Dundullimal ==
Dundullimal is an Aboriginal word meaning "thunderstorm" or "hailstorm" and was the name of the local Aboriginal group. The first reference to the name was in September 1838 in a letter written from Dundullimal by H. F. Gisborne.

Built around 1840 as the head station of this 6,500-hectare (16,000-acre) squatting run, the Dundullimal homestead is believed to be the oldest surviving slab hut house in Australia. The homestead is also Dubbo's oldest building open to the public. Its interior is relatively sophisticated for its type, with an imposing sitting room and is noted for its tent-shaped plaster ceiling, and wallpaper reproduced from an 1850s pattern. The house is furnished with original period furniture. The working areas include sandstone stables, the blacksmith's forge, coach room, sunken cool room and stores. This complex of buildings reflects the practical elements of rural life on a large, isolated property during the nineteenth century.

=== Construction and early ownership ===
The date on which the area was taken up is unknown. The first recorded occupants were brothers Charles Campbell and Dalmahoy Campbell. Dalmahoy applied for a de-pasturing licence in 1836 for the Wellington Valley.

By 1839 both Charles and Dalmahoy were listed as the licence holders and H. Price was the superintendent. There was a slab hut and woolshed, 25 acres of wheat and stock consisting of 360 cattle, eight horses and 933 sheep. There were over 20 people in residence; 14 free persons (13 males and 1 female all over the age of 12 years) in addition to five male convicts and one female convict.

Dalmahoy was listed as the only licensee in January 1840 though both he, Charles and Price were listed as licensees from July 1840 to June 1841 and, in 1841-1842, "Campbell and Price" held the licence.

In 1828 John Maugham, a retired army officer, came to New South Wales and became a wealthy merchant. He had the house built, having acquired the property in 1842. Maughan was listed as holding the licence, paying the yearly licence on 10 June 1842. In 1844 Commissioner Wright visited Dundullimal and recorded that Maughan was both licensee and superintendent. There were 12 people in residence and there was a cottage, store, kitchen, stable, smithy, woolshed and paddocks. From successive lists it appears that both Maughan and Alexander Cruickshank jointly supervised the run.

In 1848 Maughan tendered for and received a lease for Dundullimal. In March 1855, Surveyor Davidson surveyed 160 acres "applied for by Mr Maughan". Presumably this would have been a pre-emptive purchase. Maughan was to in fact purchase 81 hectares (200 acres) though when later surveyed, his block (now Portion 159, Parish of Dubbo, County Gordon) was found to be only 79 hectares (196 acres) and he was accordingly refunded A£7. The block contained the head station and woolshed and secured access to the Macquarie River. The next owners, E. B. Cornish and W. W. Brocklehurst, were English gentry with influential connections.

Dundullimal was advertised for sale in February and March 1858, though it was not until December of that year that ownership of Portion 159 transferred to E. B. Cornish and Walter W. Brockelhurst. The actual lease of the run was transferred to Cornish and Brocklehurst in February 1859. Cornish and Brockelhurst purchased an area of 180 hectares (440 acres) adjacent to Portion 159 under pre-emptive right in 1863 (now Portion 158 Parish Dubbo, County Gordon).

Cornish quit his interest in the run in 1864. The run lease and title of Portion 159 passed to Walter Brockelhurst and his brother, Edward, while title to Portion 158 passed solely to Walter. The latter also selected a further three blocks adjacent to Portion 158 (now Portions 127,128 & 131) and eight blocks downstream of Portion 159 (now Portions 9-16).

In 1870 Brocklehurst returned to England and his inheritance, Hanbury Hall in Cheshire.

=== Baird family ===
In 1871 the lease on the run was transferred to Thomas Baird who also purchased all the above freehold portions. Baird continued to purchase land and by 1884 was in possession of over 2,000 hectares (5,000 acres). It was at this time that the Crown Land Act was passed requiring the lessee to divide the run (now a 'pastoral holding') into leasehold and resumed areas. The southern half became the leasehold area and contained a woolshed (in a different location to both the earlier and present woolshed), two wooden cottages, a hut and a number of dams while the northern resumed area contained only a dam and a tank. Both contained amounts of fencing.

In 1891 the property was occupied by 13 males, four females and two male Aborigines.

Thomas Baird died in 1914 and the property passed to his daughters, Kennedy McIntosh Fletcher, Annie E. Baird, Alice L. Palmer and Hannah M. Palmer, as tenants-in-common. In c. 1927 Hannah Palmer's son, Ralph (Pat) Palmer, became manager of the property. A watercolour painting by Miss Kennedy Baird and an 1860s photograph proved the houe had indeed been of Palladian composition with balancing pavilions. The Baird family held the property until 1943 when Kennedy Fletcher's quarter share was purchased by Ralph (Pat) Palmer. He continued buying these quarter shares until 1961 when he acquired the final share. Annie Baird and Alice Palmer lived at Dundullimal up until c. 1950. The last occupant was Wallis Fletcher (a great grandson of Thomas Baird) who vacated the house in c. 1954. In the following year the house was flooded for the first time. After that time the house was used as a hay shed and cattle shelter. The property was subject to vandalism and it is believed that at one time Ralph (Pat) Palmer considered demolishing the house to prevent further such vandalism occurring.

The National Trust of Australia (NSW) recorded the property a heritage listing in July 1973 and a heritage classification it in May 1986, by which it was severely dilapidated.

The property was held under Ralph Palmer's sole freehold ownership until his death in 1982. Palmer's last manager was Kevin Hartley who died in 1986.

=== Transfer to the National Trust of Australia (NSW) ===
The property with the exception of the portion on which the early head station stands is currently owned by the Palmer family and is managed by John Macarthur. The family decided to grant the portion of land on which the early head station stands to the National Trust. In c. 1985-6 the buildings and four hectares (nine point nine acres) were gifted to the National Trust by the Palmer family, descendants of Thomas Baird. A Bicentennial Commonwealth government grant, together with the support of then Trust Director, the late Peter James, and builder Garry Waller, made it possible to restore the complex and it was opened to the public in 1988. Later that year the Royal Australian Institute of Architects awarded its architects the Lachlan Macquarie Award for the best restoration project in Australia. Since then Dundullimal has been used by the National Trust as a working museum.

The National Trust reported during 2008-9 that an operational windmill and water tanks were reinstated at Dundullimal, dramatically reducing the property's reliance on town water. In 2014 a bequest to the National Trust by Barbara West allowed restoration of the homestead and stables, and major upgrade works to create the Shed Function Centre. In August 2013 the Timbrebongie Church was moved to a new permanent home in the grounds of Dundullimal. In November 2013 the first wedding was held in the church, built by the paternal uncle of Mary MacKillop. The church relocation was funded by a Government of New South Wales community building partnerships grant and donations by Trust members including a targeted appeal.

In 2015 the Shed Function Centre was completed, with modern kitchen and facilities. The farm museum and modern cafe are proving increasingly popular with visitors. A NSW Government community grant of $35,542 allowed the Trust to restore the stock yards and eastern skillion of the shed, which had been deteriorating and collapsed in the storms of 2013-14.

== Description ==
=== Site ===
The site is roughly rectangular and sits to the east of the Dubbo Railway line, with a level crossing half way along its length, south of the homestead and north of the stables. An access road used (1986) to go under the railway and approach the homestead group from the north, curving to the group's east and splitting into two drives alongside (parallel) to the stables, around a eucalypt. The 19th century Wellington-Dubbo Road and former entrance run along (and inside) the site's southern boundary, parallel to it. These cross the railway line to the homestead group's south-west.

The site has a cluster of buildings (see below). Two yards surround the homestead and the stables/outbuilding/shed in the site's centre. A set of small yards also surround the outbuilding. A bog is to the east-north-east of the homestead and two wells, one with a windmill are on site.

A range of trees on site include a quince (Cydonia oblonga cv.) in the north-western corner, a fig (Ficus carica cv.) in the north-east near the access road. a kurrajong (Brachychiton acerifolium) east of the former kitchen's site, a silky oak (c.2.5m from the western wall of the homestead), a row of three peppercorns (Schinus molle var. areira) east of the kurrajong, another peppercorn and a eucalypt just south of fence dividing the homestead yard and stables yard, two further eucalypts straddling the "inner" split drive east of the stables and another eucalypt south-west of the stables.

Since 1986, broadly the two yards (paddocks) around the homestead and stables are now one paddock, which is "framed" by perimeter plantings of a range of species. Within this "frame" a few specimen trees exist closer to the buildings. Further shrubs line a fence between the stables' south-east corner and the outbuilding's north-western corner and run along its western side to the southern fence.

A driveway crosses the railway line at the level crossing, turns south and runs close and parallel to the railway line to form a "carriage loop" south of the fence running east–west to the southern wall of the outbuilding (shed)'s southern wall (i.e. around and south of the homestead/stables/outbuilding/garden "paddock".

Plants lining the northern fenceline (running west-east) include a flowering Prunus sp./cv., nectarine (Prunus persica cv.), tree of heaven (Ailanthus altissima), canna lily (Zantedeschia aethiopica), iris sp., daisy, box elder (Acer negundo), apricot (Prunus armenaica cv.), firewheel tree (Stenocarpus sinuatus), daisy, honeysuckle (Lonicera sp./cv.), canna lily (Canna edulis cv.), chrysanthemum cv., gladiolus cv., winter honeysuckle (Lonicera fragrantissima), saisy, honeysuckle, jonquils (Narcissus tazetta cv.), lilies (Lilium sp./cv.), daisy, geranium (Pelargonium hortorum cv.), rose (Rosacv.), honeysuckle, succulent, creeper, rhododendron, daisy, Norfolk Island hibiscus (Lagunaria patersonia), the succulent Aloe vera and a peach (Prunus persica cv.). Running north–south along the eastern "paddock/garden" fence are ash (Fraxinus sp.) oleander (Nerium oleander), butterfly bush (Cassia sp.: 2) (outside the fence to the east are the three peppercorn trees still), another ash, a holly grape (Mahonia sp.), wattle (Acacia sp.), hawthorn (Crataegus oxycantha), oleander, crepe myrtle (Lagerstroemia indica cv.), peppercorn, peach, ash, elm/ash, ash (outside the fence to the east, adjacent are another Norfolk Island hibiscus and an unnamed tree), and further south east of the homestead, another Norfolk Island hibiscus and a Cherokee rose (Rosa laevigata). Lining the "paddock/garden" fence south of the 'driveway bend south) are a hedge of lavender (Lavandula sp.), succulent Agave sp., bulbs, a peppercorn tree, a fig/privet (Ligustrum sp.), an apricot, (in the south-western corner, an ash). Running along the southern "paddock/garden" fence are three peppercorn trees, a grey box (Eucalyptus moluccana), a jacaranda (Jacaranda mimosifolia), another ash, a Norfolk Island hibiscus and a silky oak west of the outbuilding. Running west of the outbuilding (shed) and its internal fence to the stables, from south-north, are three silky oaks, an ash tree, two eucalypts, another ash tree, daisy, geranium, box elder, rhododendron and an oleander bush. North of the yard north of the outbuilding (shed) are another ash and a Norfolk Island hibiscus. Another Cherokee rose is inside the aforementioned yard. Between the stables and the homestead are a peppercorn and eucalypt trees (north- north-east) and (further north-west near the driveway "bend" south, another eucalypt.

Around the homestead, starting on the southern side are a butterfly bush on the south-west corner, an unnamed bush on the south-east corner, a daisy bush, rhododendron, oleander, ash (around the fence around the former kitchen site east of the homestead), a wild rose, a banksia bush (northeastern side of house), the climber Wisteria sinensis, violets and jonquils a daisy bush and a rosemary (Rosmarinus officinalis) to the house's north and another rose (north-west side).

=== Homestead ===
Cottage ornee, the best and most sophisticated house of its type in the country. 'T-shaped' in plan with projecting room on its north elevation. A watercolour (painting) and an 1860s photograph proved the house had indeed been of Palladian composition with balancing pavilions. It is built on the same axis as its stone stables and coach house.

A low cobbled verandah runs along the north elevation and around the projecting room. There is a verandah along the south elevation flanked by two box rooms. The main roof is hipped in form. The building is formed from yellow box vertical slabs fitted into a framework of posts and channelled plates. Rustic ceilings are of cypress pine board resting on exposed beams, with a coffered board ceiling in the main sitting room. The main roof and verandah rafters are formed of unhewn cypress poles. A shingle roof is now covered by corrugated galvanised iron.

Windows are twelve pane sashes, the upper sash has eight panes, the lower four. Extraordinary glazing patterns. The structure has two distinct types of plastering: limewash over a float coat and a set coat over a float coat. The internal doors and skirtings are cypress pine. The remaining (and fine) joinery is red cedar. Smart early Victorian wallpaper, ledged pine cottage doors. There was a butler's pantry and a spring bell system.

The homestead group of outbuildings comprise stone stables, a coach house / outbuilding, located south-west of the homestead and stables, the site of the former kitchen, located east of homestead, and the site of the former privy, located east of the homestead and former kitchen site). Also located on the site are a windmill and well, located north of the homestead, another well, located south-east of the homestead, equidistant between it and the stables, a silo, located south of the stables, a sump, located east of the silo, and the header tank, located east of the homestead.

=== Condition ===
As at 25 March 2002, the physical condition was good.

Dunudullimal is almost completely unaltered from the time of its construction.

=== Modifications and dates ===
- 1993 adaptation of timber stables outbuilding as an education and visitor centre, and archaeological testing to install services - new hardwood floor on piers over original earth floor, installation of kitchen, toilets, water, power, lighting, earth access ramp for disabled visitors, general repairs to building and yard
- 2008: operational windmill and water tanks reinstated, reducing the property's dependence on town water.
- 2013: historic timber church moved onto the property (original Timbrebongie Roman Catholic Church) - Dundullimal as a large working property once had its own church.

== Heritage listing ==
Dundullimal is of State significance as the oldest known extant house situated outside the limits of settlement (the 19 counties proclaimed by Governor Darling in 1826) It is the oldest known squatters residence in this part of New South Wales, having been built c. 1842. The original homestead building, in its original form, has survived in a near-unaltered condition since its construction in the 1840s. It has well detailed joinery. Associated with the house is a fine stone stables/barn and a large timber shed which is sympathetic to the earlier buildings.

Dundullimal Homestead was listed on the New South Wales State Heritage Register on 1 March 2002 having satisfied the following criteria:

The place is important in demonstrating the course, or pattern, of cultural or natural history in New South Wales.

Dundullimal is of State significance as the oldest known extant house situated outside the limits of settlement (the 19 counties proclaimed by Governor Darling in 1826) It is the oldest known squatters residence in this part of New South Wales, having been built c. 1842.

The place is important in demonstrating aesthetic characteristics and/or a high degree of creative or technical achievement in New South Wales.

Dundullimal is the most sophisticated extant slab building in this part of New South Wasles. This sophistication results from its unique plan form, its unusual and extremely well executed joinery and finish, and its formal relationship to the stables immediately to the south. It has well detailed joinery. Associated with the house is a fine stone stables/barn and a large timber shed which is sympathetic to the earlier buildings.

== See also ==
- Australian residential architectural styles
