= Parish of Ponto =

Ponto, NSW New South Wales
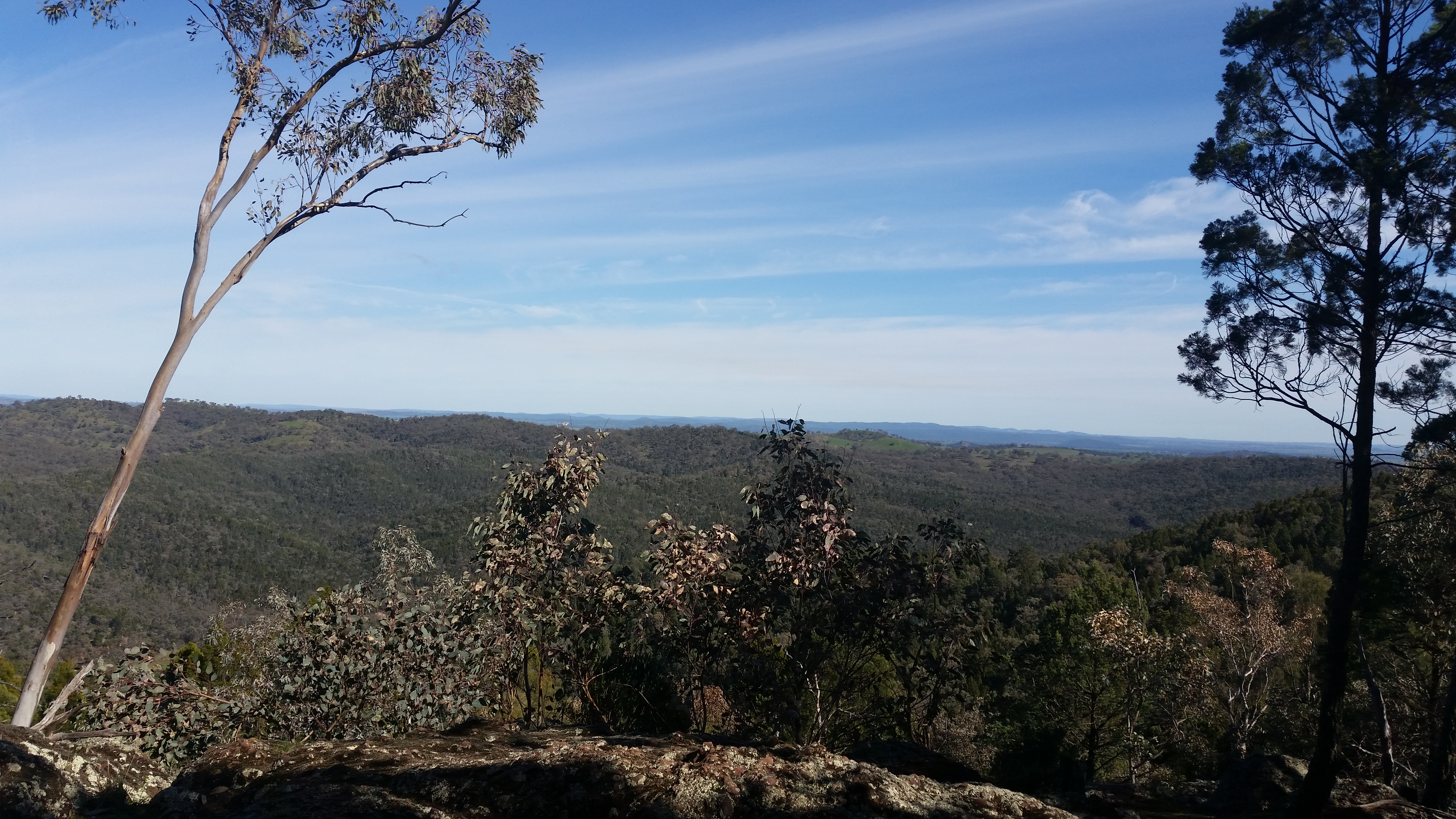
- Mt Arthur Reserve, Ponto Parish

- Coordinates: 32°33′0″S 148°56′0″E
- Postcode(s): 2820
- Location: 360 km (224 mi) WNW of Sydney; 49 km (30 mi) SE of Dubbo; 100 km (62 mi) N of Orange; 92 km (57 mi) W of Mudgee
- LGA(s): Dubbo Regional Council
- State electorate(s): Dubbo
- Federal division(s): Parkes
| Mean max temp | Mean min temp | Annual rainfall |
| 24.3 °C; 76 °F | 9.4 °C; 49 °F | 618.4 mm 24.3 in |

Ponto, New SouthWales is a civil parish of Gordon County, New South Wales, a Cadastral divisions of New South Wales.

The parish is on the Macquarie River north of Wellington, New South Wales. The Molong–Dubbo railway line passes through the parish.
