= Parish of Terrabella =

Terrabella Parish New South Wales
- Coordinates: 32°15′25″S 148°36′4″E
- Postcode(s): 2830
- Time zone: AEST (UTC+10)
  - Summer (DST): AEDT (UTC+11)
- Location: 400 km (249 mi) NW of Sydney
- LGA(s): Dubbo Regional Council
- Region: Central West / Orana
- County: Gordon
- State electorate(s): Dubbo
- Federal division(s): Parkes
Mean max temp	Mean min temp	Annual rainfall
24.3 °C; 76 °F	10.1 °C; 50 °F	551.7 mm 21.7 in

Terrabella Parish is a civil parish of Gordon County, New South Wales. a Cadastral divisions of New South Wales.

The parish is on the Macquarie River and Little River Creek, midway between Dubbo and Wellington, New South Wales. the nearest town. The Murrumbidoera falls are in the parish and the Molong–Dubbo railway line passes through the parish.
