= Parish of Wandawandong =

Wandawandong, New South Wales is a civil parish of Gordon County, New South Wales.

Wandawandong Parish is a civil parish of Gordon County, New South Wales. a Cadastral divisions of New South Wales. The parish is on Obley Rd at the confluence of the Little River and Wandawandong Creek. The only town in the parish is the hamlet of Obley, New South Wales.

The economy is based on agriculture, and agricultural services.
