= Cumnock railway station, New South Wales =

Former railway station in New South Wales, Australia

Cumnock

General information
- Location: Cumnock, New South Wales; Australia
- Coordinates: 32°55′55″S 148°45′06″E
- Operator: Public Transport Commission
- Line: Molong-Dubbo
- Distance: 389.070 kilometres from Central
- Platforms: 2 (1 island)
- Tracks: 3

Construction
- Structure type: Ground

Other information
- Status: Disused

History
- Opened: 19 January 1925
- Closed: c.1974

Services
Preceding station	Former services	Following station
Yullundry towards Dubbo	Molong–Dubbo line	Larras Lee towards Molong
Location

Cumnock railway station was a railway station on the Molong–Dubbo railway line in New South Wales, Australia. The station opened in 1925 and is now closed. The station itself consisted of two passenger platforms in an island configuration, with a wooden station building and station signs. Opposite was a third, goods platform and a grain siding. While passenger services ceased operations in 1974, the line itself continued to transport freight until 1993. Cumnock has remained disused since passenger services ceased.
