= Parish of Narragal =

Neurea Parish, New South Wales is a civil parish of Gordon County, New South Wales, a Cadastral divisions of New South Wales.

The parish is on the Bell River and Curra Creek and the nearest large town is Wellington, New South Wales is north of the parish although a village of Neurea is within the parish.
