= Parish of Cardington =

Cardington Parish, New South Wales is a civil parish of Gordon County, New South Wales, a Cadastral divisions of New South Wales.

The parish is on the Bell River and the nearest large town is Wellington, New South Wales north of the parish.
