= Parish of Burrawong =

Burrawong Parish is a civil parish of Gordon County, New South Wales, a Cadastral divisions of New South Wales.

Burrawong Parish is between Molong, New South Wales and Wellington, New South Wales and the (inactive) Molong–Dubbo railway line passes through the parish, with a siding at Yullundry Railway Station.
