= Wellington Post Office =

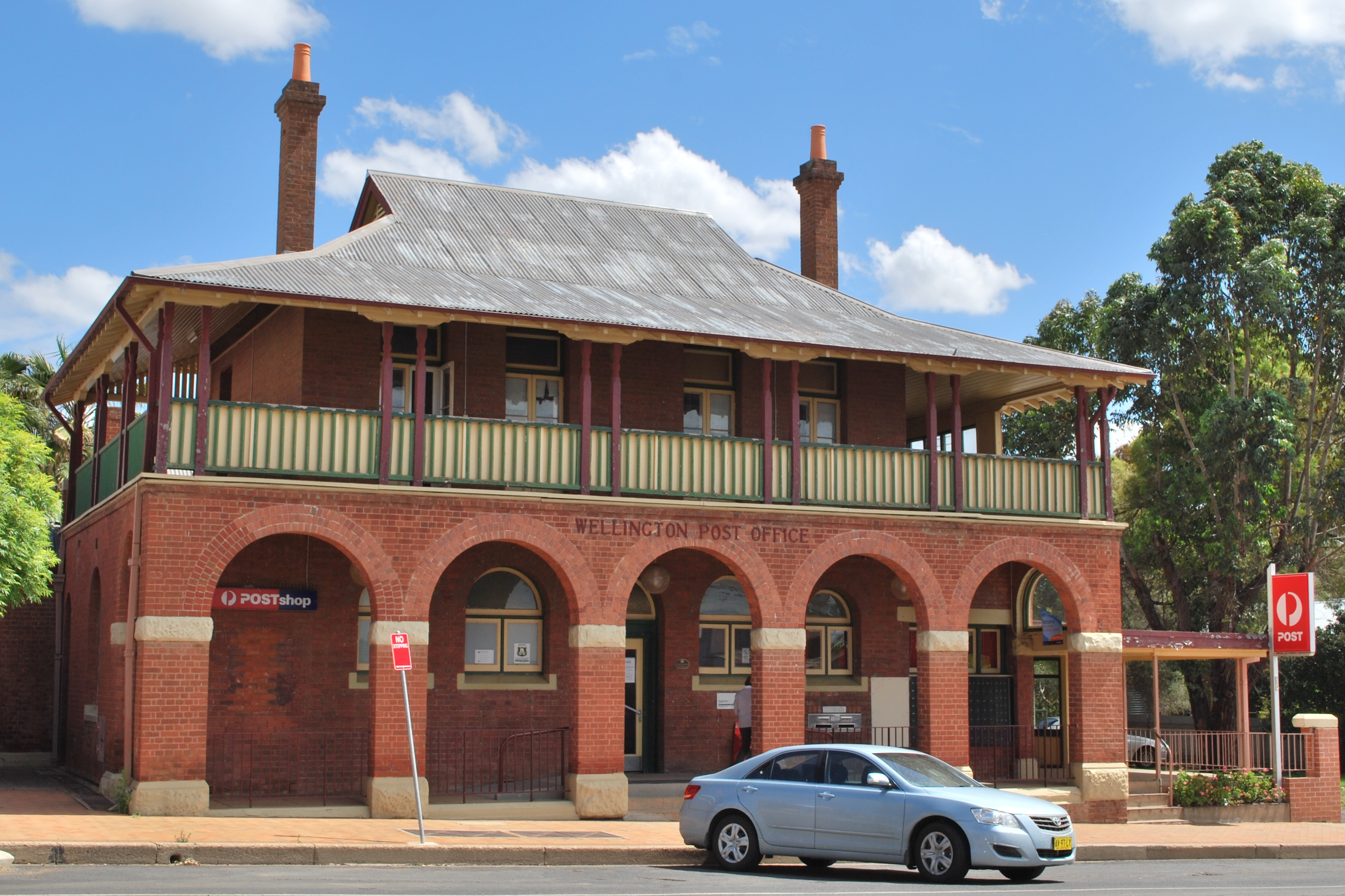
- Wellington Post Office in the Federation Arts and Crafts style, pictured in 2008

- Location within New South Wales Location within Australia
- 32°33′22″S 148°56′37″E
- Location: 21 Maughan Street, Wellington, Dubbo Regional Council, New South Wales, Australia

History
- Built: 1869–1904

Site notes
- Architect: James Barnet (NSW Colonial Architect)
- Architectural style: Federation Arts and Crafts
- Owner: Australia Post

New South Wales Heritage Register
- Official name: Wellington Post Office
- Type: State heritage (built)
- Designated: 22 December 2000
- Reference no.: 1415
- Type: Post Office
- Category: Postal and Telecommunications

The Wellington Post Office is a heritage-listed post office located at 21 Maughan Street, Wellington in the Dubbo Regional Council local government area of New South Wales, Australia. It was designed by Colonial Architect’s Office, under the direction of James Barnet, and built between 1869 and 1904. The property, which is owned by Australia Post, was added to the New South Wales State Heritage Register on 22 December 2000.

== History ==
=== Background ===
The first official postal service in Australia was established in April 1809, when the Sydney merchant Isaac Nichols was appointed as the first Postmaster in the Colony of New South Wales. Prior to this, mail had been distributed directly by the captain of the ship on which the mail arrived, however this system was neither reliable nor secure.

In 1825 the colonial administration was empowered to establish a Postmaster General's Department, which had previously been administered from Britain.

In 1828 the first post offices outside of Sydney were established, with offices in Bathurst, Campbelltown, Parramatta, Liverpool, Newcastle, Penrith and Windsor. By 1839 there were forty post offices in the Colony, with more opened as settlement spread. During the 1860s, the advance of postal services was further increased as the railway network began to be established throughout NSW. In 1863, the Postmaster General, W. H. Christie noted that accommodation facilities for postmasters in some post offices was quite limited, and stated that it was a matter of importance that "post masters should reside and sleep under the same roof as the office".

The first telegraph line was opened in Victoria in March 1854 and in NSW in 1858. The NSW Colonial Government constructed two lines from the Sydney GPO, one to the South Head Signal Station, the other to Liverpool. Development was slow in NSW compared to the other states, with the NSW Government concentrating on the development of country offices before suburban ones. As the line spread, however, telegraph offices were built to accommodate the operators. Unlike the post office, the telegraph office needed specialised equipment and could not be easily accommodated in a local store or private residence. Post and telegraph offices operated separately until January 1870 when the departments were amalgamated, after which time new offices were built to include both postal and telegraph services. In 1881 the first telephone exchange was opened in Sydney, three years after the first tests in Adelaide. As with the telegraph, the telephone system soon began to extend into country areas, with telephone exchanges appearing in country NSW from the late 1880s onwards. Again the post office was responsible for the public telephone exchange, further emphasising its place in the community as a provider of communications services.

The appointment of James Barnet as Acting Colonial Architect in 1862 coincided with a considerable increase in funding to the public works program. Between 1865 and 1890 the Colonial Architect's Office was responsible for the building and maintenance of 169 post offices and telegraph offices in NSW. The post offices constructed during this period featured in a variety of architectural styles, as Barnet argued that the local parliamentary representatives always preferred "different patterns".

The construction of new post offices continued throughout the Depression years under the direction of Walter Liberty Vernon, who held office as Colonial Architect from 1890 to 1911. While twenty-seven post offices were built between 1892 and 1895, funding to the Government Architect's Office was cut from 1893 to 1895, causing Vernon to postpone a number of projects.

Following Federation in 1901, the Commonwealth Government took over responsibility for post, telegraph and telephone offices, with the Department of Home Affairs Works Division being made responsible for post office construction. In 1916 construction was transferred to the Department of Works and Railways, with the Department of the Interior responsible during World War II.

On 22 December 1975, the Postmaster General's Department was abolished and replaced by the Post and Telecommunications Department. This was the creation of Telecom and Australia Post. In 1989, the Australian Postal Corporation Act established Australia Post as a self-funding entity, heralding a new direction in property management, including a move away from the larger more traditional buildings towards smaller shop front style post offices.

For much of its history, the post office has been responsible for a wide variety of community services including mail distribution, an agency for the Commonwealth Savings Bank, electoral enrolments, and the provision of telegraph and telephone services. The town post office has served as a focal point for the community, most often built in a prominent position in the centre of town close to other public buildings, creating a nucleus of civic buildings and community pride.

=== The Wellington Valley ===
At the time of European settlement, the land between Bathurst and Wellington was occupied by the Wiradjuri people whose land extended from the Great Dividing Range in the east and bordered by the Macquarie, Lachlan and Murrumbidgee rivers. The rivers acted as an important travel and trade routes with each clan group having a clearly defined area of responsibility. The people from this area settled along the main rivers during the summer months and moved to other favoured and drier campsites in the winter months. Evidence of the occupation of the Wellington area by the Wiradjuri in pre-contact times survives in the form of rock shelters with deposits, carved trees, scarred trees, open camp sites, grinding grooves sites, bora (ceremonial) grounds and burial grounds (AHIMS). The name Nubrygyn derives from the Aboriginal name "Lubrygee", said to mean junction of the two creeks.

The first Europeans officially travelling through this country were members of the expedition party led by John Oxley, Surveyor-General for the Colony. It was during his exploration of the Lachlan Valley that he discovered the Wellington Valley on 19 August 1817, when the explorers entered the valley through Glenfinlass (Curra Creek) finding and naming the Bell and Macquarie rivers. Oxley called the valley "The Vale of Tempe" after the Duke of Wellington.

In 1823 the first penal settlement west of the Blue Mountains was established near the Bell River. The convict settlement operated until 1832 when the site became a joint Anglican / Lutheran mission. Wellington was declared a town in 1849 and a municipality in 1879. The railway arrived in 1880 and by the First World War, the population numbered around 3,000.

The Wellington Valley was settled as a convict stock station for the breeding of cattle, far removed from the interference of free settlement and any comforts that they may provide. Despite this, free settlers soon followed using Wellington as a staging post for settlement further west. Free settlement began in the late 1820s and the town of Wellington began to grow.

==== Wellington Post Office ====
The first post office was opened in Wellington on 1 April 1838 with William Turner, the Clerk of the Chamber of Magistrates, as Postmaster. The post office initially operated out private homes and businesses in Montefiores, where the early settlement was centred, on the opposite side of the river to Wellington proper. The early years of the mail service between Sydney and Wellington were hampered by bushrangers, with the mail coach being held up twice in the year 1840. In 1848 the mail service ran between Penrith and Bathurst three times a week and then onto Wellington, and Molong once per week and was worth A£1,200 per annum, with Henry Rotton being named as the successful contractor.

In 1862 Cobb & Co. extended their service into western NSW, buying the mail contract for Wellington in the same period. Bushranging was still a concern for mail coaches particularly after the 1850s when gold was discovered in the western districts. Both the Orange to Wellington coach and the Bathurst coach were bailed up in March 1864. Gold bought several thousand miners into the Wellington district, creating a boom period through the 1850s and 1860s.

In 1868 the people of Wellington made representations for the erection of a new post office by the Government. On 3 May a public meeting was held concerning the matter, with tenders for a Post and Telegraph building being called for in November. The successful contractor was William Moffatt for A£1,298. The building would house both post and telegraph offices, which had operated separately since the arrival of the telegraph to Wellington in 1862. The new building was built in Maughan Street, close to the centre of town, with the Colonial Architect reporting it completed on 12 October 1868. Curiously, while the telegraph was relocated to the new building and a branch of the Government Savings Bank opened in December 1871, the post office was still operating out of a private dwelling in 1872. The delay had been caused by the joint duties of Thomas Croft as telegraph master and postmaster. With seventy miles of telegraph line to maintain, Croft was often away from the town for several days doing repairs and checks. Due to illness, his wife was unable to take charge of the post office duties so Henry Lambert operated the post office from a "suitable premise" in Wellington. A petition forwarded by residents in 1872 asked that the post office be conducted from the new Government building, as it was currently inconveniently located.

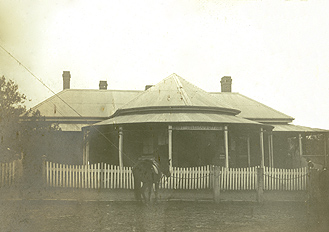
Wellington Post and Telegraph Office in the Victorian Georgian style, undated.

The post office was relocated to the new building in 1872, operating from here until 1904. In 1900 the PMG directed that a new post office building should be built in Wellington, as it was no longer viable to "patch up or add to the present structure". Plans were drawn up for a new building which included a 2.8-square-metre (30 sq ft) office, mail room, public space and telegraph room. A residence was included with living room, sitting room and five bedrooms. The estimated cost for the project was A£2,450. In 1902 the PMG decided to spend A£1,200 on renovating and extending the old building and to rent a temporary premises for A£25 per annum while the alterations were carried out.

The new post office was finished on 8 February 1904 at the cost of A£1,391.7s.0d, and opened on 26 March by Postmaster General Sir Philip Fysh. The new office was an extension of the 1868 building, built to the north of the original, joining it at the northern wall. Matching bricks were used in the construction. Adjoining the office to the rear was a single-storey kitchen block, with a stable, a store, fuel store and toilets also in the back yard. The entire site was enclosed by a picket fence with gardens on the east and west.

In March 1905, the Wellington Telephone Exchange was opened within the post office, with a continuous service being provided from April. The service was further updated in January 1906 with a trunk line to Sydney becoming available.

There have been a number of changes to the building since that time, including infill of the western and rear verandahs during the mid-twentieth century, the bathroom fitout on the first floor and division of the ground-floor southern room in the c. 1970-80s, and the western post box addition in the 1980s.

== Description ==
The Wellington Post Office is located within a civic precinct of face brick buildings that includes the Court House, a recent ambulance station and a Telstra building. The post office is situated within a predominantly one to two storey, late nineteenth to early-twentieth century retail and commercial streetscape.

The post office is a two-storey face red brick building that has undergone several changes from its original construction in 1868 as a single-storey telegraph office and residence. The original building was constructed in the Victorian Georgian style. A two-storey northern addition was completed in 1904. It is built in the Federation Arts and Crafts style, and has a complex hipped corrugated iron roof, with a gabled hip roof to the northern two-storey section and skillion additions. The two-storey roof is punctuated on the east and west sides by two single face brick chimneys with corbelled tops and terracotta chimney pots. There are five corbelled face brick chimneys to the single-storey southern section of building and a rendered corbelled chimney to the kitchen block. Construction of the main building is a combination of stretcher bond and English bond red brickwork, with tuck pointing to sections of the front facade that is showing signs of deterioration.

There are a number of additions to the rear and western side of the building. These comprise weatherboard and vertical profiled steel sheet infills of the western side verandahs, post boxes, toilet additions, and rear awnings.

The northern facade is symmetrical, with a two-storey verandah. The ground-floor arcade has five wide arched bays constructed with round header arches supported by painted, rock-faced sandstone imposts and brick piers with painted sandstone bases. It has a concrete floor and steps and boarded soffit painted cream with exposed joists and beams, and shaped cornices. The first-floor verandah has an asphalt lined floor with brown painted, paired timber posts, timber boarded soffit and vertical batten balustrade with fibro backing board painted green and cream. The western side of the first-floor verandah is also partially enclosed with asbestos cement sheet and batten, and glass louvres.

The fenestration is symmetrical to the front facade, with French doors to the first-floor verandah and paired arched windows either side of the front door at ground floor centre.

The ground-floor interior of the post office comprises four main areas. These include the carpeted northern retail area and offices to the eastern side, sheet vinyl and tiles to the mail rooms and amenities to the southern end of the building.

The ground-floor ceilings are constructed using a variety of techniques, including board and batten with a narrow coved cornice to the kitchen, hall, offices and majority of the retail area. The ceiling is boarded behind the counter to the eastern side of the retail area and adjacent mail room with an ovolo cornice and there are some exposed beams to the mail room and retail area. Lighting to the ground floor comprises suspended fluorescent tubing and air conditioning, including some exposed ducting and vents to the retail area, with some window air conditioning units and fans installed to offices.

Architraves appear original to the existing fabric and skirting appears original or early, with modification in some areas. Internal doors to the ground floor are a combination of many original four-panel doors and some modern flush and half glazed doors. Windows to the front facade comprise fixed lights, small casement and fixed arched fanlights with a later door. There are louvres to the side and rear infills and additions, along with security doors and original multi-pane sash windows with rubbed red brick flat arches to the rear outbuildings.

Ground-floor walls are a combination of rendered and painted masonry walls and internal partitions in the current standard Australia Post grey colour scheme. All fireplaces to this level have been bricked in, with the kitchen hearth transformed to a cupboard, and the surrounds retained to the kitchen, contractor's room and Postal Manager's Office.

The main stair is unusual, being straight with a single landing halfway. It is carpeted with polished turned timber posts and balusters, with a shaped rail. Original or early skirting is painted brown and the stair hall has a partially raked board and batten ceiling.

The first floor of the post office comprises two carpeted former bedrooms to the north and a tiled bathroom to the southwestern corner. The first-floor ceilings are v-joint boarded throughout with an ovolo cornice, with attached fluorescent lights and no air conditioning or fans. Architraves appear original and in good condition, with a picture rail retained to the northwestern former bedroom and original skirting to all spaces excepting the bathroom with a modern fitout. Internal doors to the first floor are original four panel with beehive hardware and fanlights, and there are original French doors to the verandah with adjustable fanlights.

Walls to the first floor are rendered and painted masonry, with varying colour schemes of cream to the hall, powder blue to the northeastern room and mauve to the northwestern room. There is a plain arch over the stair and some horizontal timber lining boards from the first floor up in the stair hall. Fireplaces to the first floor have been boarded over.

Signage comprises the lettering across the front facade centre below the first floor level "Wellington Post Office", a small sign attached to the western column of the centre bay and the standard Australia Post sign on a post attached to the front of the western post office box addition.

There is an abundance of vegetation around the building, including several large trees to the western boundary, grassed area to the rear of the kitchen block, garden beds with palms and geraniums, and concrete driveway and parking area to the rear and western side.

Outbuildings include the former stables building to the south of the site, probably constructed during 1869 and the attached kitchen block between the main building and stables building. It appears that the original slate to the roof of the former stables has been retained under the current corrugated iron cladding. There is some mortar loss to the western wall, some brick deterioration and cracking and it is generally in fair condition.

=== Condition ===
As at 12 July 2001, generally, the exterior of Wellington Post Office was in very good condition, with only some minor concrete cracking to the front ground-floor verandah.

Wellington Post Office appears largely intact structurally, with the majority of original fabric from both phases of construction retained. The post office also retains the features which make it culturally significant including architectural features such as the large round arches, prominent roof forms with slender symmetrical chimneys, arcaded porch at street level, along with the prominence of the building in the streetscape and its overall form, scale and style.

=== Modifications and dates ===
Original single-storey building constructed in 1869 comprising Telegraph Office and residence. It is also presumed that the former stables building and kitchen to the south of the site was constructed at around the same time. In October 1872 the post office was moved into the Maughan Street Telegraph Office. In 1904 the final stage of construction was completed, creating a two-storey section to the north of the original single-storey building, with residence on the first floor. Weatherboard infill of western and rear verandahs and addition of southwestern corner toilets, possibly c. 1950s–60s. The first floor bathroom fitout to the southwestern former bedroom and the division of the ground floor southern room for two long storage rooms probably occurred during c. 1970–80s. A western post box addition with a flat roof and the concrete on brick loading dock adjacent, were probably constructed c. 1980s. There was standard Australia Post retail fitout to the ground floor c. 1990s.

=== Further information ===
Intrusive elements to the appearance of Wellington Post Office include the western dock and post office box addition to the ground floor, and the first-floor modern bathroom fitout in the original bedroom.

== Heritage listing ==
As at 12 July 2001, the Wellington Post Office was significant at a State level for its historical associations, strong aesthetic qualities and social value.

The Wellington Post Office is associated with the early development of the town, as it is linked with the original post office built in 1838. Wellington Post Office is also historically significant because it is associated with the development of communications services in the district during the second half of the nineteenth century. The two distinct phases in the development of the post office reflect the growth of the town in the late nineteenth and early twentieth centuries. The Wellington Post Office is also historically significant because it is associated both the Colonial Architect's Office under James Barnet and the NSW Government Architect's Office under Walter Liberty Vernon. The Wellington Post Office is aesthetically significant because it displays an unusual combination of the Victorian Georgian and Federation Arts and Crafts architectural styles, with strong visual appeal. The architectural style and location of the post office in a predominantly turn-of-the-century streetscape also make it a focal point of the Wellington civic precinct, endowing it with landmark qualities. The Wellington Post Office is also considered to be significant to the community of Wellington's sense of place.

The Wellington Post Office was listed on the New South Wales State Heritage Register on 22 December 2000 having satisfied the following criteria.

The place is important in demonstrating the course, or pattern, of cultural or natural history in New South Wales.

The Wellington Post Office is associated with the early development of the town and with the original post office built in 1838. Wellington Post Office is also historically significant because it is associated with the development of communications services in the district during the second half of the nineteenth century. The two distinct phases in the development of the post office reflects the growth of the town in the late nineteenth and early twentieth centuries. The decision to extend the existing post office rather than construct a new building also reflects the economic limitations of the Postmaster General's Office at the turn of the century. The Wellington Post Office also provides evidence of the changing nature of postal and telecommunications practices in NSW. The apparent retention of the original stable outbuilding and kitchen wing is also historically important, as few stables associated with post offices appear to have survived. However, further research is required to determine the exact construction date and extent of change to this building. The Wellington Post Office is historically significant because it is associated with both the Colonial Architect's Office under James Barnet and the NSW Government Architect's Office under Walter Liberty Vernon.

The Colonial Architect's Office under Barnet designed and maintained a number of post offices across NSW between 1865 and 1890.

The place is important in demonstrating aesthetic characteristics and/or a high degree of creative or technical achievement in New South Wales.

The Wellington Post Office is aesthetically significant because it is an unusual combination of architectural styles from two distinct periods; the original building is simply constructed in the Victorian Georgian style, and the 1904 addition is built in the Federation Arts and Crafts Style, with strong visual appeal. This addition has been well integrated, and has such distinctive characteristics as the prominent roof forms accentuated by two slender symmetrical chimneys, large arched openings and the arcaded porch.

The architectural style and location of the post office in a predominantly turn-of-the-century streetscape also make it a focal point of the Wellington civic precinct, endowing it with landmark qualities. The architectural style of the post office complements that of the courthouse nearby.

The place has a strong or special association with a particular community or cultural group in New South Wales for social, cultural or spiritual reasons.

As a prominent civic building and the centre of communications for over a century, Wellington Post Office is considered to be significant to the community's sense of place. The 1868 community petition for construction of the original post office provides a clear indication of the importance of a reliable postal service to the local population.

The place has potential to yield information that will contribute to an understanding of the cultural or natural history of New South Wales.

The site has the potential to contain an archaeological resource, which may provide information relating to the previous use of the site, and the original form of the 1868 post office and outbuildings.

The place possesses uncommon, rare or endangered aspects of the cultural or natural history of New South Wales.

The Wellington Post Office is it incorporates substantial sections of the early post office constructed during the 1860s. The Wellington Post Office is also unusual for the combination of two distinct architectural styles. The 1904 addition transformed it from a relatively simple, small scale post office into a more prominent public building.

The place is important in demonstrating the principal characteristics of a class of cultural or natural places/environments in New South Wales.

Wellington Post Office demonstrates the principle characteristics of both the Victorian Georgian and Federation Arts and Crafts architectural styles. The 1904 addition enhances the overall form of the building, and is a strong example of the Federation Arts and Crafts style of architecture.

It is representative of the work of both the Colonial Architect's Office and the NSW Government Architect's Office.

== See also ==
- Australian non-residential architectural styles
