= Parish of Neurea =

Neurea, NSW New South Wales
- Coordinates: 32°33′0″S 148°56′0″E
- Postcode(s): 2820
- Location: 360 km (224 mi) WNW of Sydney; 49 km (30 mi) SE of Dubbo; 100 km (62 mi) N of Orange; 92 km (57 mi) W of Mudgee
- LGA(s): Dubbo Regional Council
- State electorate(s): Dubbo
- Federal division(s): Parkes
Mean max temp	Mean min temp	Annual rainfall
24.3 °C; 76 °F	9.4 °C; 49 °F	618.4 mm 24.3 in

Neurea Parish, New South Wales is a civil parish of Gordon County, New South Wales, a Cadastral divisions of New South Wales.

The parish is on the Bell River and Curra Creek and the nearest large town is Wellington, New South Wales is north of the parish although a village of Neurea is within the parish.
