= Parish of Bolderogery =

Bolderogery Parish
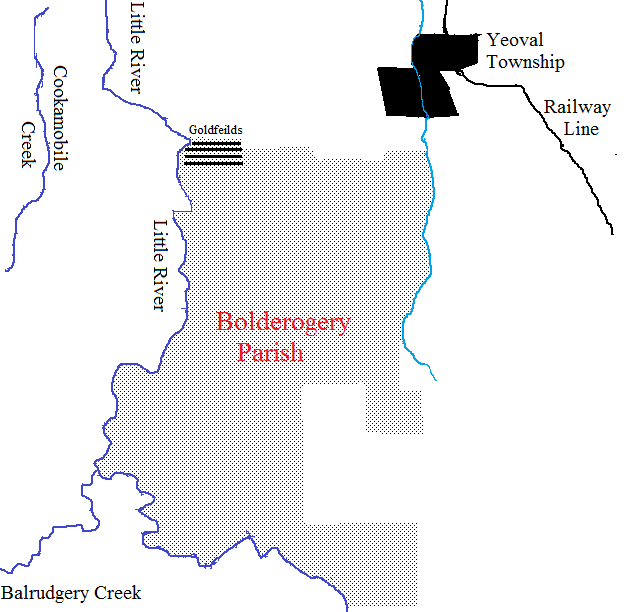
- Bolderogery Parish Sketch Map

- Coordinates: 32°45′S 148°39′E
- Country: Australia
- State: New South Wales
- LGA: Cabonne Shire

Government
  - State electorate: Orange
  - Federal division: Calare
- Postcode: 2868
- County: Gordon

Bolderogery, New South Wales is a civil parish of Gordon County, New South Wales. a Cadastral divisions of New South Wales. Bolderogery Parish is located between Yeoval, New South Wales and the Little River (Dubbo).
