= Walmer railway station, New South Wales =

Former railway station in New South Wales, Australia

Walmer

General information
- Location: Walmer, New South Wales; Australia
- Coordinates: 32°39′44″S 148°43′34″E
- Operator: Public Transport Commission
- Line: Molong-Dubbo
- Distance: 427.780 kilometres from Central
- Platforms: 1

Construction
- Structure type: Ground

Other information
- Status: Demolished

History
- Opened: 31 May 1925
- Closed: 23 November 1974

Services
Preceding station	Former services	Following station
Arthurville towards Dubbo	Molong–Dubbo line	Yeoval towards Molong
Location

Walmer railway station was a railway station on the Molong–Dubbo railway line in New South Wales, Australia. The station opened in 1925 and closed in 1974. The station consisted of a passenger platform and a goods platform. Only a water tank remains at the site, with no other remains of the station.
