= Cumnock railway station =

Cumnock railway station may refer to:

- Either of two railway stations serving Cumnock, East Ayrshire, Scotland
  - Cumnock railway station, Ayrshire (1872–1951)
  - Old Cumnock railway station (1850–1965)
- Cumnock railway station, New South Wales, Australia
