= Parish of Curra =

Curra Parish, NSW New South Wales
- Coordinates: 32°33′0″S 148°56′0″E
- Postcode(s): 2820
- Location: 360 km (224 mi) WNW of Sydney; 49 km (30 mi) SE of Dubbo; 100 km (62 mi) N of Orange; 92 km (57 mi) W of Mudgee
- LGA(s): Dubbo Regional Council
- State electorate(s): Dubbo
- Federal division(s): Parkes
Mean max temp	Mean min temp	Annual rainfall
24.3 °C; 76 °F	9.4 °C; 49 °F	618.4 mm 24.3 in

Curra Parish, New South Wales is a civil parish of Gordon County, New South Wales, a Cadastral divisions of New South Wales.

The parish is on the Macquarie River and Curra Creek. The town of (west) Wellington, New South Wales is at the northern end of the parish and is the main land use feature of the parish. The Dubbo Railway Line passes through the parish.
