= Gordon County =

Gordon County may refer to:

- Gordon County, Georgia, United States
- Gordon County, New South Wales, Australia
