= Parish of Benolong =

Benolong Parish New South Wales
- Coordinates: 32°15′25″S 148°36′4″E
- Postcode(s): 2830
- Time zone: AEST (UTC+10)
  - Summer (DST): AEDT (UTC+11)
- Location: 400 km (249 mi) NW of Sydney
- LGA(s): Dubbo Regional Council
- Region: Central West / Orana
- County: Gordon
- State electorate(s): Dubbo
- Federal division(s): Parkes
Mean max temp	Mean min temp	Annual rainfall
24.3 °C; 76 °F	10.1 °C; 50 °F	551.7 mm 21.7 in

Benolong Parish is a civil parish of Gordon County, New South Wales. a Cadastral divisions of New South Wales.

The parish is on the Macquarie River and Whylandra Creek south of Dubbo, New South Wales, the nearest town.

The now disused Molong–Dubbo railway line passes through the parish with Nubingerie railway station in the parish.
