= Larras Lee railway station =

Former railway station in New South Wales, Australia

Larras Lee
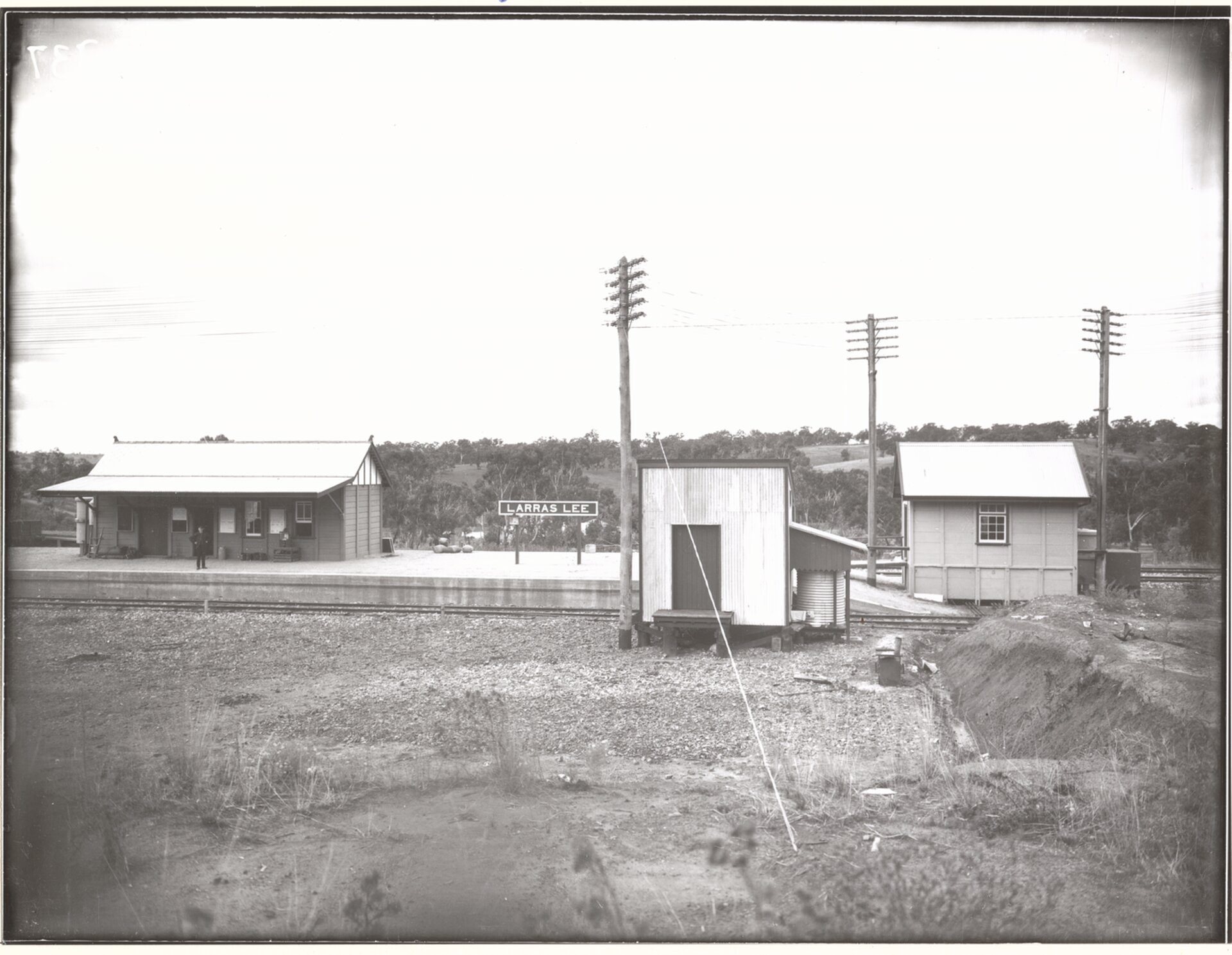
- Looking towards the platforms at Larras Lee, 1925

General information
- Location: Larras Lee, New South Wales; Australia
- Coordinates: 33°00′01″S 148°51′38″E
- Operator: Public Transport Commission
- Line: Molong-Dubbo
- Distance: 370.810 kilometres from Central
- Platforms: 2
- Tracks: 2

Construction
- Structure type: Ground

Other information
- Status: Demolished

History
- Opened: 19 January 1925
- Closed: 23 November 1974

Services
Preceding station	Former services	Following station
Cumnock towards Dubbo	Molong–Dubbo line	Molong Terminus
Location

Larras Lee railway station was a railway station on the now-closed Molong- Dubbo railway line in New South Wales, Australia. The station opened in 1925 and closed to passenger services in 1974. The station was subsequently demolished and no trace of it remains now. The railway line through Larras Lee officially closed in 1993.
