= Cumnock, New South Wales =

Cumnock
- Town
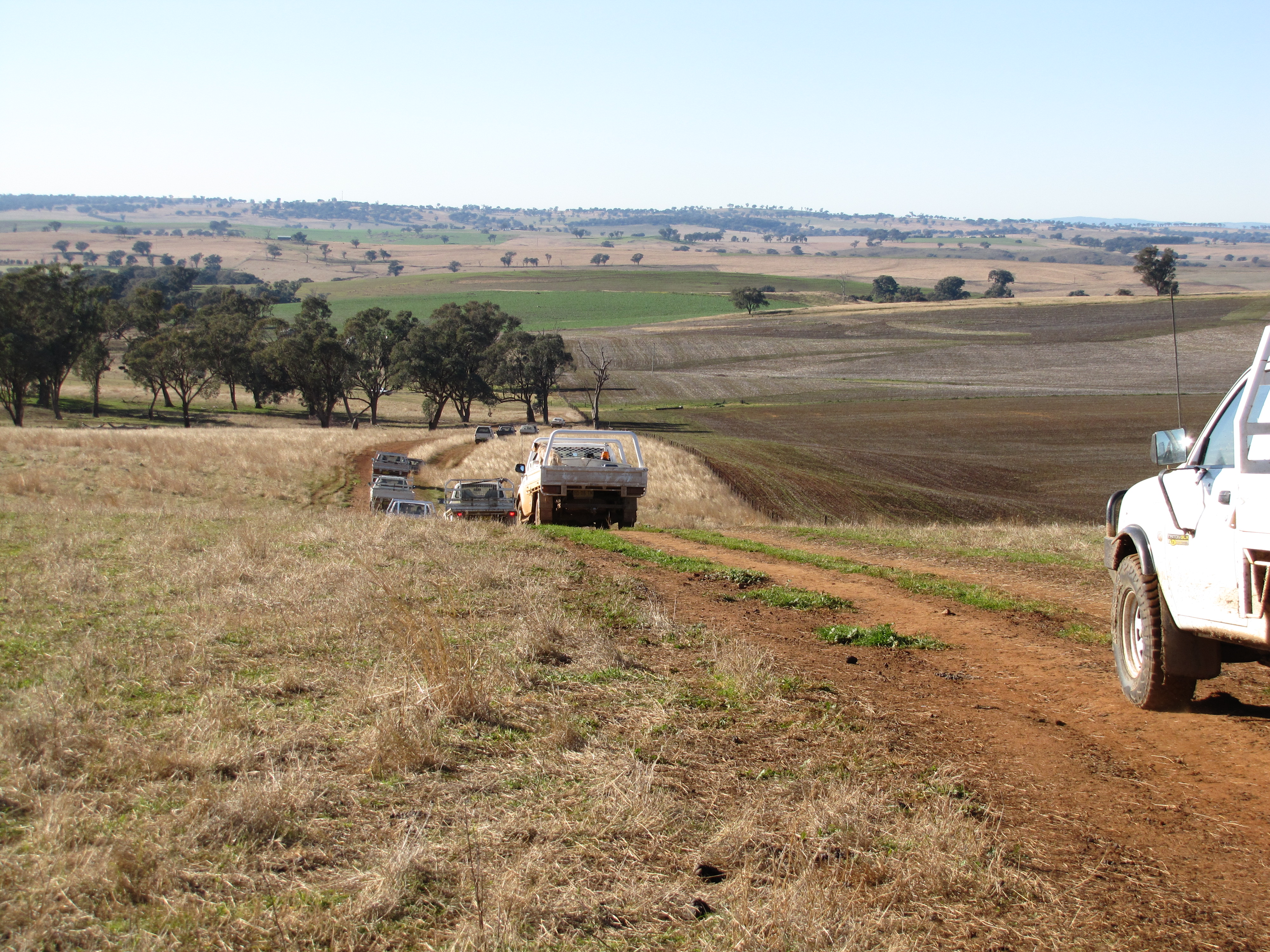
- Landscape near Cumnock

- Coordinates: 32°55′S 148°46′E
- Country: Australia
- State: New South Wales
- LGA: Cabonne Shire Council
- Location: 318 km (198 mi) WNW of Sydney; 59 km (37 mi) NW of Orange; 24 km (15 mi) NNW of Molong; 75 km (47 mi) SE of Peak Hill; 25 km (16 mi) S of Yeoval

Government
  - State electorate: Orange
  - Federal division: Calare
- Elevation: 514 m (1,686 ft)

Population
  - Total: 491 (2021 census)
- Postcode: 2867
- County: Gordon
- Parish: Burrawong

Cumnock is a small town in New South Wales, Australia. It is located on the now closed cross-country railway line from Molong to Dubbo. The town is located in Cabonne Shire. At the 2011 census, Cumnock had a population of 275 people. In the 2021 census the "Suburbs and Localities" of Cumnock had a population of 491.

Cumnock is named after the Scottish town in Ayrshire, the home of an early settler named Straborn.

The Cumnock community pioneered a farmhouse rental program designed to attract new families to the area by making farmhouses available for rent for $1. This program has since spread to a number of other rural communities.

Cumnock is located at the epicentre of the Central Western NSW's food-and-wine triangle, i.e., Orange, Dubbo, and Mudgee.

The town is also known for its participation in the 120-kilometre Animals on Bikes 'Paddock Art' sculpture tourist trail which extends between Molong and the Dubbo Zoo, via Cumnock and Yeoval.

== Notable people ==
Notable residents include:

- Chris McKivat, Olympian and dual rugby code international.
- Tim Gavin, Australian Rugby International.
- Susan Cullen-Ward, later married to Leka, Crown Prince of Albania.
