= Pinecliffe railway station =

Former railway station in New South Wales, Australia

Coordinates: 33.1516°S 148.7976°E

Pinecliffe was a railway station on the Broken Hill railway line in New South Wales, Australia. The station opened in 1897 as Bockoble and closed to passenger services in 1974. No trace now remains of the station.

Preceding station	Former services	Following station
Gregra towards Broken Hill	Broken Hill Line	Molong towards Orange
