= Trent Runciman =

Australian rugby league footballer

Personal information
- Full name: Trent Runciman
- Born: 3 April 1979 (age 46); Wellington, New South Wales, Australia

Playing information
- Position: Second-row, Lock
Club
Years	Team	Pld	T	G	FG	P
1998	Canterbury Bankstown	1	0	0	0	0
2001–02	Wests Tigers	22	1	0	0	4
	Total	23	1	0	0	4

Trent Runciman (born 3 April 1979) is a former professional rugby league footballer who played in the 1990s and 2000s for the Canterbury-Bankstown Bulldogs and Wests Tigers.

== Playing career ==
Runciman made his first-grade debut for Canterbury in Round 14 of the 1998 season against Newcastle. This would be the only first-grade appearance Runciman would make and he spent the rest of his time playing in reserve grade. Runciman won two reserve grade premierships with Canterbury in 1998 and 2000.

In 2001, Runciman joined the Wests Tigers. In Round 7 2001, Runciman scored his only try in first grade which was against Canberra. Runciman went on to make 22 appearances for Wests over his 2 seasons at the club but was released at the end of 2002.
