= Trundle, New South Wales =

Trundle
- Town
- Coordinates: 32°55′20″S 147°42′25″E
- Country: Australia
- State: New South Wales
- LGA: Parkes Shire
- Location: 420 km (260 mi) W of Sydney; 180 km (110 mi) SW of Dubbo; 61 km (38 mi) NW of Parkes; 69 km (43 mi) NE of Condobolin; 37 km (23 mi) SSE of Tullamore

Government
  - State electorate: Orange
  - Federal division: Parkes

Population
  - Total: 335 (2021 census)
- Postcode: 2875

Trundle is a small town in Parkes Shire in the Central West of New South Wales, Australia. It and the surrounding area had a population of 335 in the 2021 census.

It lies in wheat-growing country and is on the Bogan Gate–Tottenham railway line, completed to Trundle in 1907.

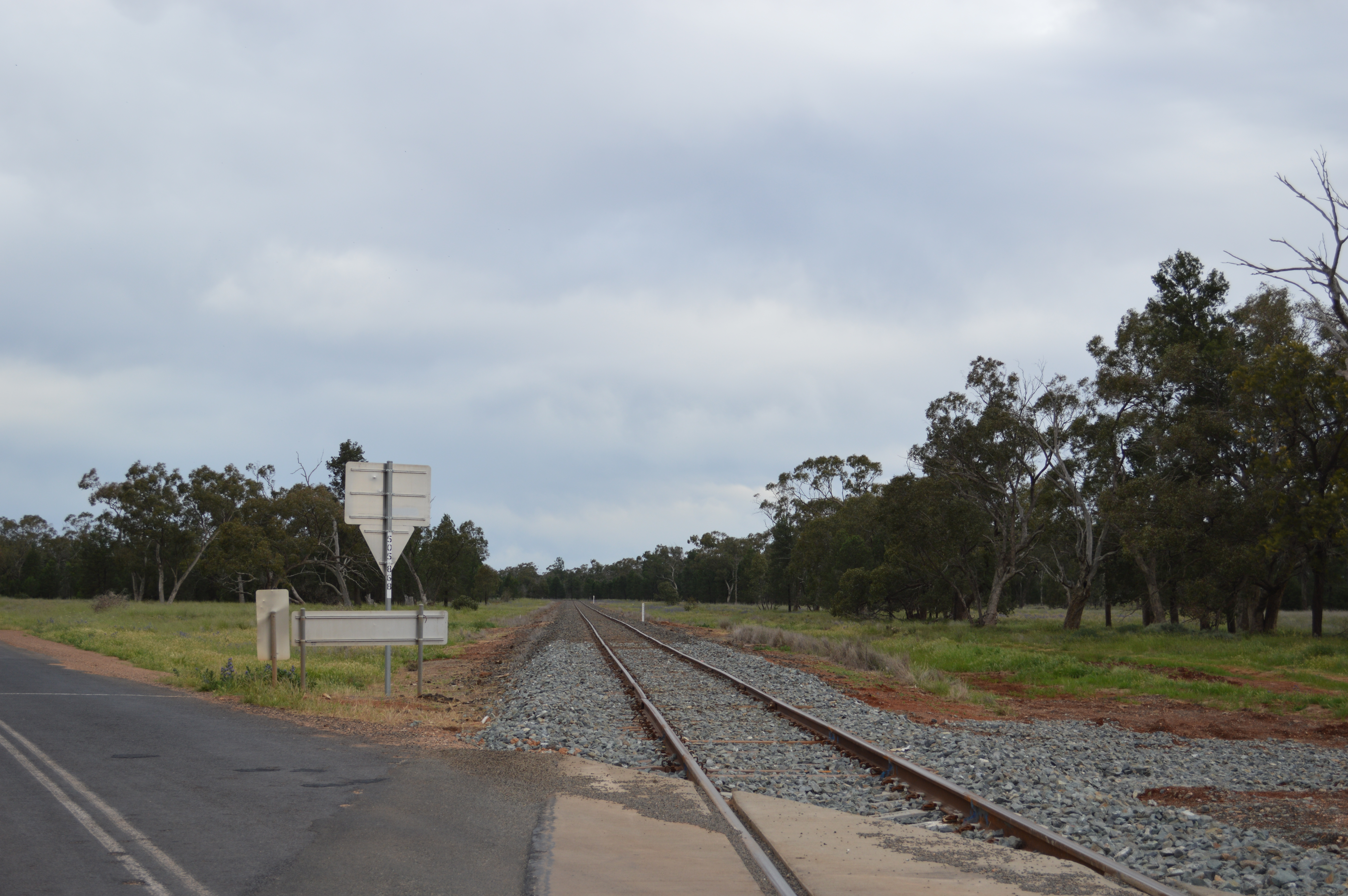
The Tottenham branch line at Trundle, 2013

The line is now used for freight only.

== History ==
Trundle lay on the southern boundary of the Wangaibon people's traditional lands.

Trundle Lagoon Post Office opened on 1 May 1889 and was renamed Trundle in 1892.

The (NSW) Geographical Names Board's only record of the origin of the name is a State Rail Authority's archives document on station names which indicates that the name probably originated from Trundle (hill-fort), about 24 km northeast of Portsmouth, England. ['Trundle' is an old English word for 'circle'.]

The archives document also said that it was the name of William Cumming's leased runs in 1859, which he called Trundle Lagoon; that the 1866 Gazetteer recorded that Trundle Lagoon was occupied by George and John Palmer; and that the school opened as Trundle Lagoon in 1883, then Trundle in 1885.

=== Hotel ===
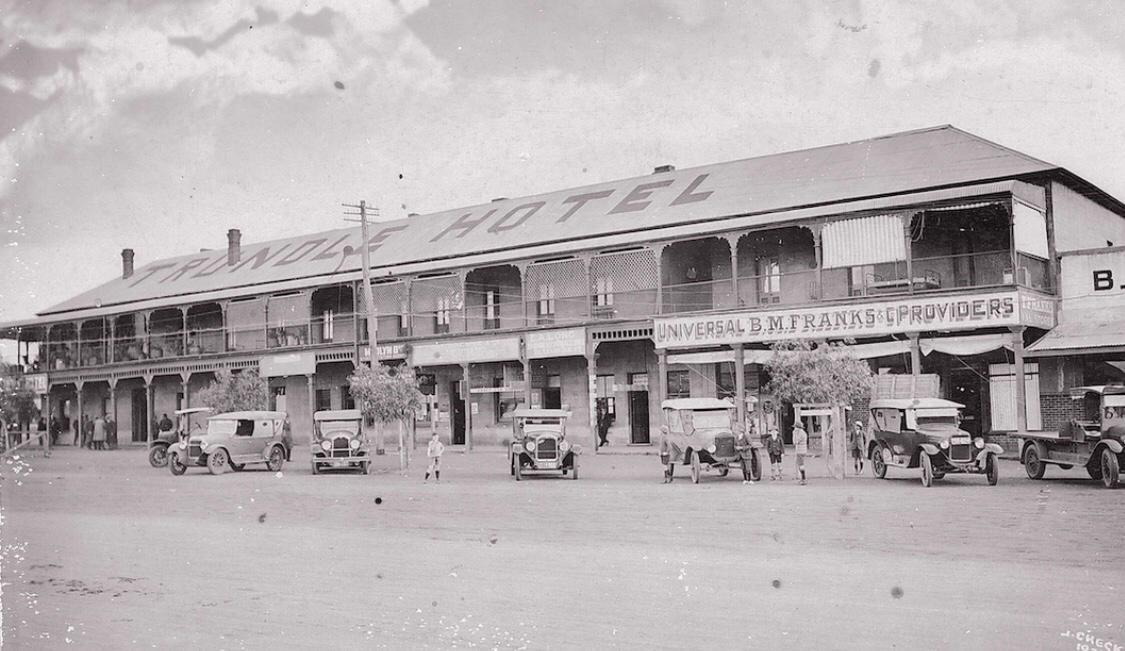
Trundle Hotel early photo

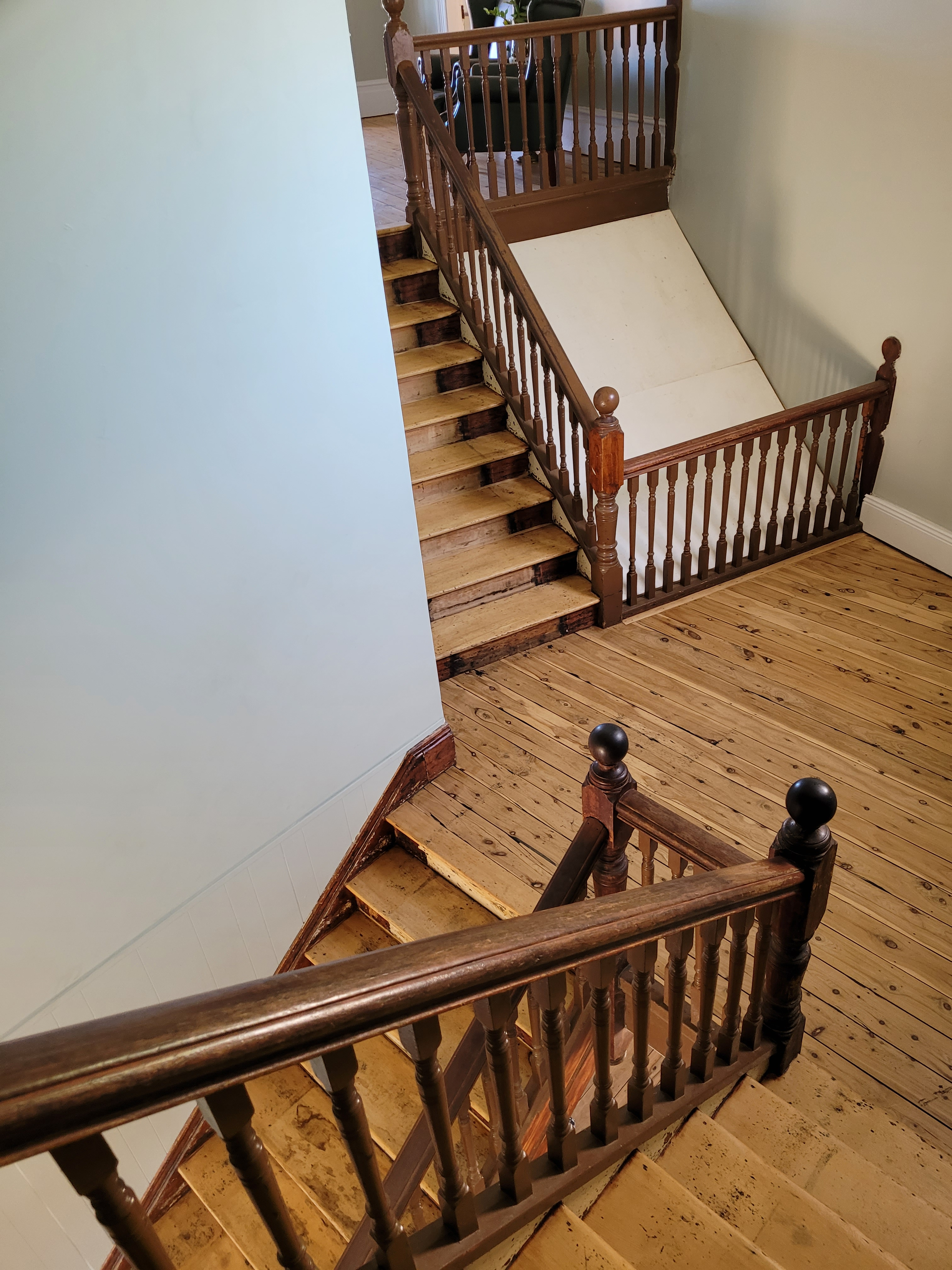
Internal stairways, Trundle Hotel

The Trundle Hotel was opened 17 March 1912, replacing an earlier 1888 building. The hotel was designed with long halls and corridors to allow cool drafts to flow through the building. The building was constructed by A.E.Ware for 5,000 pounds ($10,000). The hotel claims the second longest hotel balcony (with 68 metres facing Forbes St and 18 metres facing Parkes St), in New South Wales. (The longest hotel balcony in New South Wales is in Cobar, at 91 metres.)

=== Other buildings ===
The Union Hotel was also built by A.E.Ware, in 1912. That hotel was subsequently demolished. Other buildings constructed by A.E.Ware included The Trundle School of Arts and the Trundle Picture Palace, both also built in 1914.

== Today ==
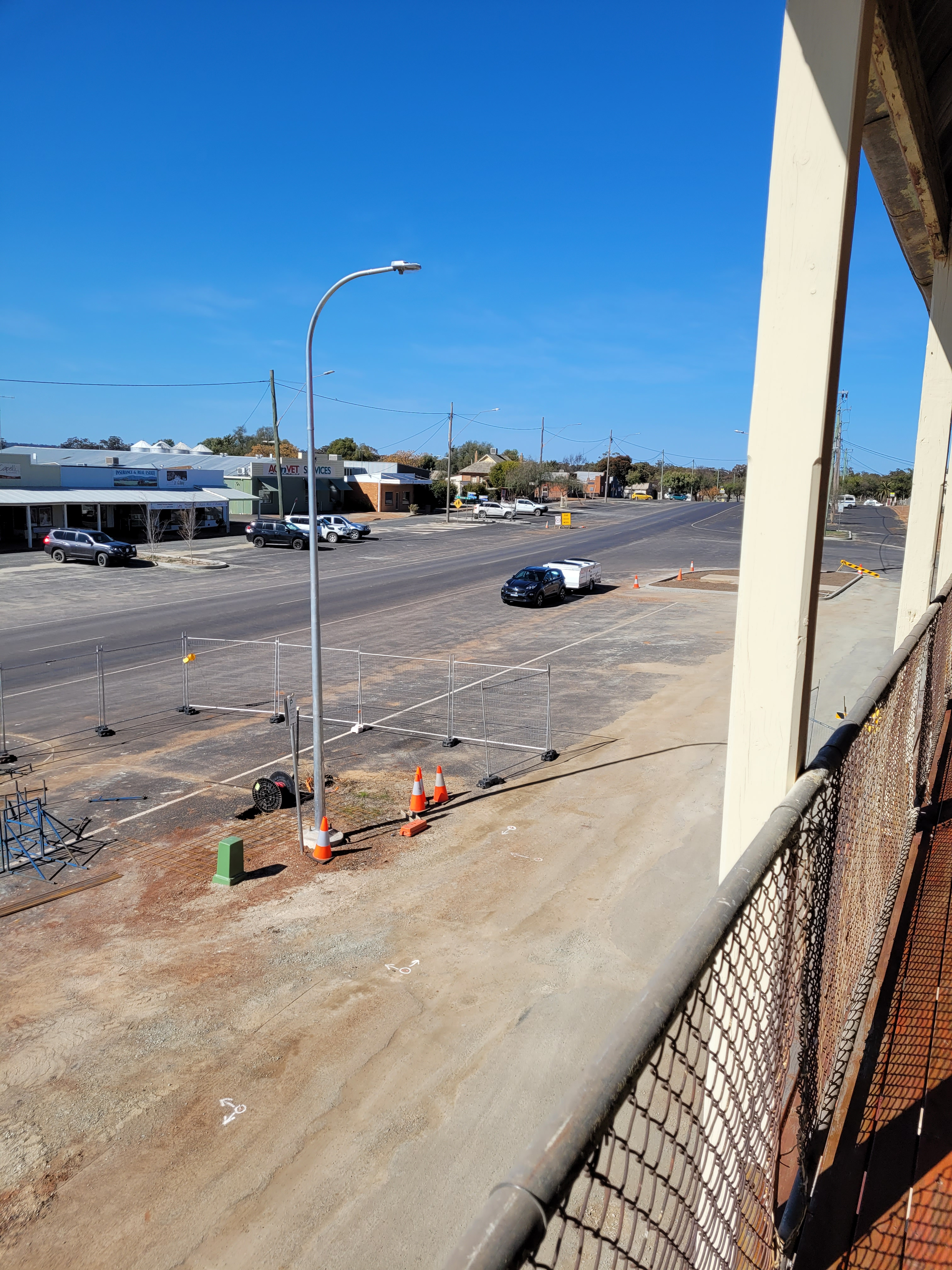
Trundle's wide main street - view from hotel

The town is noted for having one of the widest main streets in the country, at 60 metres. It was built as wide as this to accommodate turning bullock trains.

Health services are provided through the Trundle multi-purpose health centre (formerly the Trundle hospital).

There is also a golf course with sand-oil greens, a 25-metre swimming pool, tennis courts, horse-racing facilities and a sporting oval named Berryman Park.

In 2011, Trundle took part in Country Town Rescue for the ABC. Old farmhouses were rented out for a dollar per week to encourage new residents to the town. A TV documentary about the scheme was broadcast on 27 March 2012.

=== Berry Memorial Church ===
The Berry Memorial Methodist Church was opened and dedicated on Saturday 25 March 1939. The church was a gift of Mrs Walter Berry in memory of her husband and to commemorate the arrival of the Berrys in 1887. The church’s architect was Hedley Norman Carr and was built by James Fullerton & Son. The internal pews, pulpit, and communion rail were installed by E. Mills & Sons and the electric lighting by contractor A. F. Jones. The church is now part of the Uniting Church of Australia.

=== Bush Tucker Day ===
The town's annual festival, called "Bush Tucker Day", is held every September, when Trundle's small population usually increases 10 fold. The main event is a bush tucker cook off, which involves contestants striving to make the best-tasting bush food. A panel of judges decides the winner. Other competitions during the day include damper throwing, billy boiling and dog jumping, and there are also bush stalls to browse through. Bush music is a major part of the day.

=== Trundle ABBA Festival ===
In 2012, in the tradition of the Parkes Elvis Festival, Trundle launched its own tribute with the inaugural Trundle ABBA Festival (Australia's first dedicated ABBA festival), which was held in the main street of Trundle, Trundle Memorial Hall, Trundle Hotel and Trundle Services Club in Forbes St, Trundle.

In 2013, it won Event of the Year 2013 honors at the Parkes Shire Australia Day Awards, and features in the ABC Documentary ABBA: Bang A Boomerang.

After a break, because of the Covid pandemic, the 2023 ABBA festival was held on Saturday 14 October 2023 and with the 2024 ABBA Festival held on 19 October 2024.

== Schools ==
- Trundle Central School
- St Patrick's Primary school

== See also ==
- Parkes, New South Wales
