= Parish of Whylandra =

Whylandra Parish New South Wales
- Coordinates: 32°15′25″S 148°36′4″E
- Postcode(s): 2830
- Elevation: 275 m (902 ft)
- Time zone: AEST (UTC+10)
  - Summer (DST): AEDT (UTC+11)
- Location: 400 km (249 mi) NW of Sydney
- LGA(s): Dubbo Regional Council
- Region: Central West / Orana
- County: Lincoln
- State electorate(s): Dubbo
- Federal division(s): Parkes
Mean max temp	Mean min temp	Annual rainfall
24.3 °C; 76 °F	10.1 °C; 50 °F	551.7 mm 21.7 in

Whylandra Parish is a civil parish of Gordon County, New South Wales. a Cadastral divisions of New South Wales.

The parish is on the Macquarie River and Whylandra Creek south of Dubbo, New South Wales, the nearest town.
