= Gregra railway station =

Former railway station in New South Wales, Australia

Coordinates: 33.1796°S 148.7699°E

Gregra

General information
- Location: Australia
- Line: Broken Hill railway line, New South Wales

History
- Opened: 1893
- Closed: 1974

Services
Preceding station	Former services	Following station
Manildra towards Broken Hill	Broken Hill Line	Pinecliffe towards Orange
Location
- Location within New South Wales Location within Australia

Gregra is a closed railway station on the Broken Hill railway line in New South Wales, Australia. The station opened in 1893 and closed to passenger services in 1974. Only remains of the platform are now visible at the site.
