= Manildra railway station =

Former railway station in New South Wales, Australia

Coordinates: 33°11′12″S 148°41′42″E

Manildra is a closed railway station on the Broken Hill railway line in New South Wales, Australia. The station opened in 1893 and is closed to passenger services. It was used for safeworking purposes for a time after its closure to passenger services. Manildra is home to the Manildra Group, the largest industrial wheat producer in Australia, and various rail sidings allow goods trains to service the mill.

Preceding station	Former services	Following station
Meranburn towards Broken Hill	Broken Hill Line	Gregra towards Orange
