= Farmhouse rental =

Housing policy

Farmhouse rental is a method used by many rural Australian towns to attract new residents. Farmhouse rental programs generally offer abandoned and often semi-derelict farmhouses for rent at a nominal price, for example, $1 per week. The towns that offer such programs have generally undergone a significant decline in population. As a result, essential services for the area such as education and health are removed or reduced, creating a further, spiralling, population decline. By attracting new residents, the communities hope to reverse their demographic spiral.

The modern farmhouse rental program began in the Central West town of Cumnock. The organisers there claim the program was successful; claiming the population of the town grew by 30 per cent and the local school hired a new teacher as a result of the 14 new enrolments. As a result, the program has been adapted widely across rural New South Wales and beyond. Similarly, the rural locality of Errowanbang saw its school's population rise above the two teacher threshold for the first time in its history.

In 2011, the ABC produced a documentary following the farmhouse rental scheme of Trundle, "Country Town Rescue".

== Communities offering farmhouse rentals ==
- Cumnock, New South Wales
- Errowanbang, New South Wales
- Greenethorpe, New South Wales
- Ilford, New South Wales
- Tallimba New South Wales
- Tottenham, New South Wales
- Trundle, New South Wales
- Tullamore, New South Wales
- Wycheproof, Victoria
