= Molong railway station =

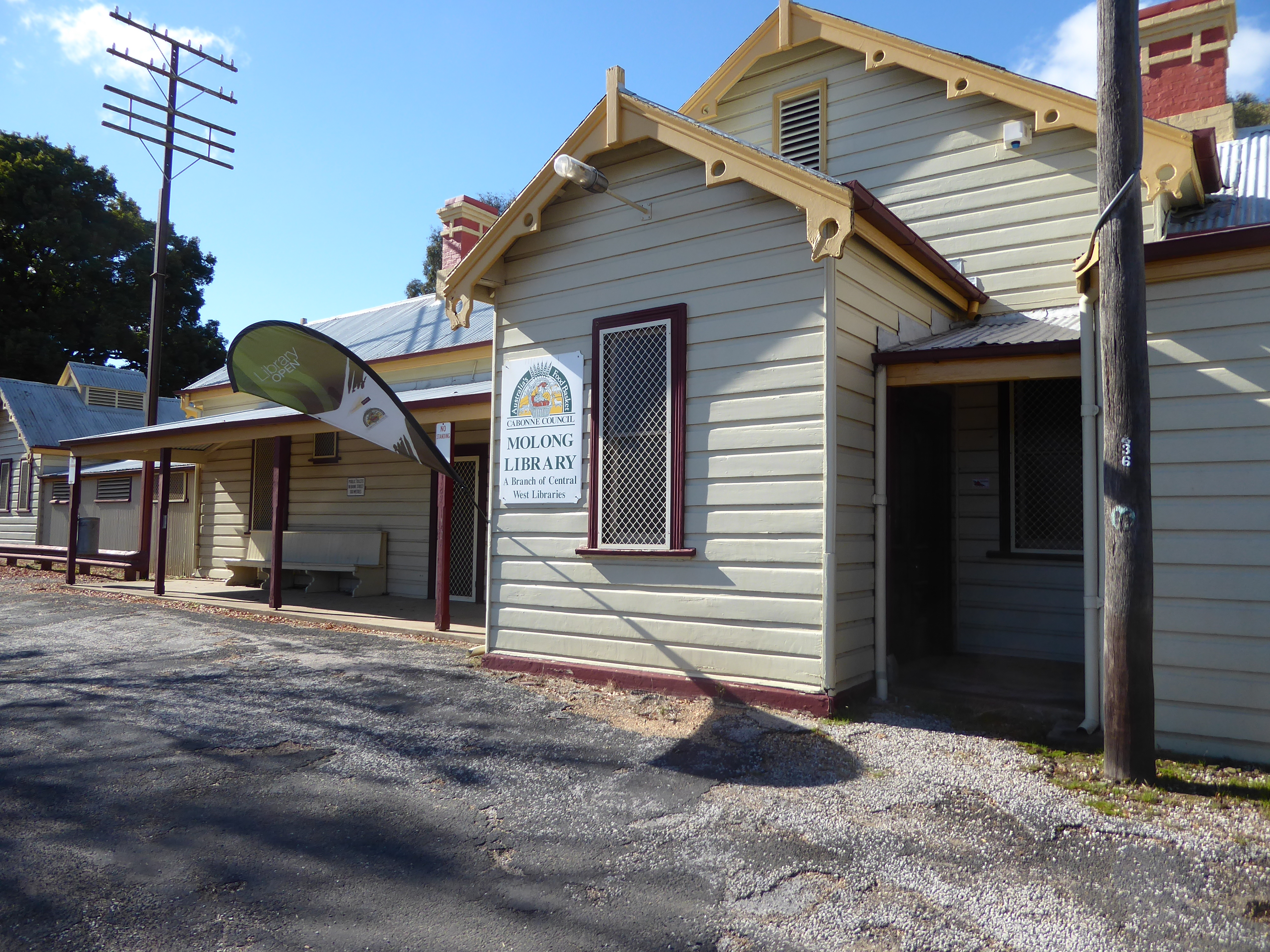
- The station building in 2017

- Location within New South Wales Location within Australia
- 33.0933°S 148.8717°E
- Location: Main Western railway, Molong, Cabonne Shire, New South Wales, Australia

Site notes
- Owner: Transport Asset Manager of New South Wales

New South Wales Heritage Register
- Official name: Molong Railway Station and yard group
- Type: state heritage (complex / group)
- Designated: 2 April 1999
- Reference no.: 1196
- Type: Railway Platform/Station
- Category: Transport – Rail

Molong railway station is a heritage-listed former railway station and now library on the Main Western railway line at Molong, Cabonne Shire, New South Wales, Australia. The property was added to the New South Wales State Heritage Register on 2 April 1999.

== History ==
The station opened in 1885, and was the terminus of the line between 1886 and 1893. It is now closed to passenger services.

The station closed in the early 1990s. The goods shed was demolished at that time, and the station was also faced with prospective demolition, but was saved by the efforts of local residents.

Of timber construction, the station survives largely intact, is well maintained and is in use by various local community groups and a branch of the Central Western Libraries. North of the station (westwards along the railway) lies the junction point to the now-closed Molong–Dubbo railway line.

The library was relocated from the station building in late 2018, resulting in concern for the building's future.

== Description ==
The heritage-listed complex includes a timber station building of a type 4 standard roadside design with a brick platform dating from 1885. It also includes a gable-roof, pre-cast concrete signal box dating from 1924. Two locomotive water columns dating from c. 1900, the timber road overbridge, and the bunya pine (Araucaria bidwillii) tree outside the station are also included in the heritage listing.

== Heritage listing ==
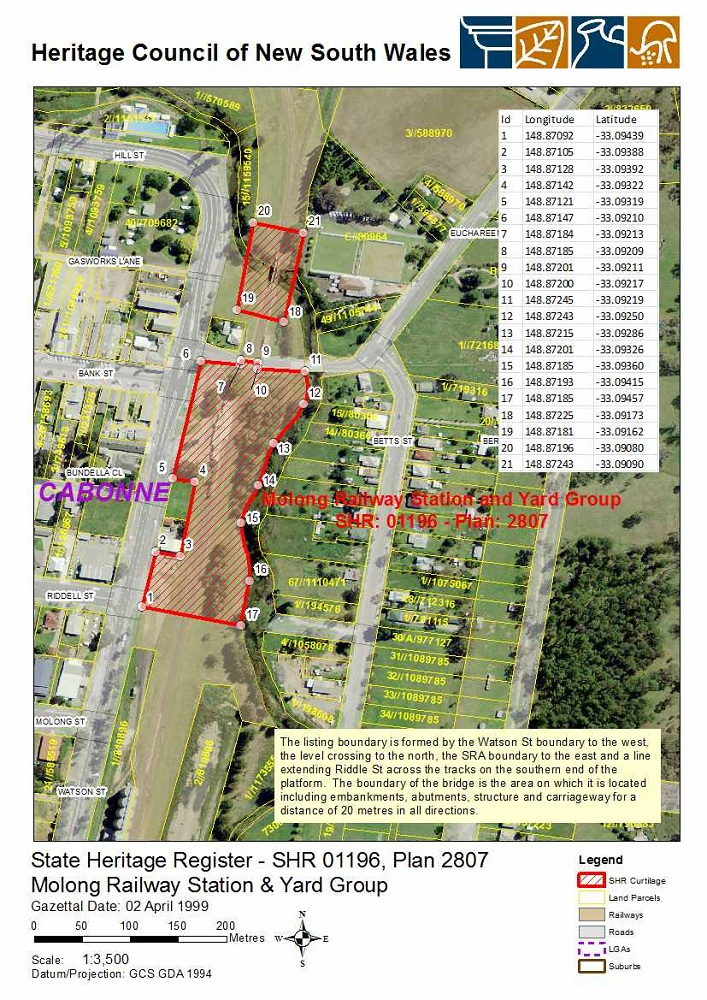
Heritage boundaries

Molong is an example of a standard timber wayside station. The station building is the main element of the group but its setting is important to the way the buildings are seen in the town.

The bridge is an example of a once common but now rare timber bridge structure.

Molong railway station was listed on the New South Wales State Heritage Register on 2 April 1999 having satisfied the following criteria.

The place possesses uncommon, rare or endangered aspects of the cultural or natural history of New South Wales.

This item is assessed as historically rare. This item is assessed as arch. rare. This item is assessed as socially rare.

== See also ==
Preceding station	Former services	Following station
Pinecliffe towards Broken Hill	Broken Hill Line	Amaroo towards Orange
Larras Lee towards Dubbo	Molong–Dubbo line	Terminus
