= Obley, New South Wales =

Obley, New South Wales located at 32°44′54″S 148°36′04″ is a locality of Cabonne Shire Council, New South Wales, located 50 km south of Dubbo.

Obley is along Obley Road where it crosses the Little River. A larger town was laid out but it never developed, due to the competition with nearby Yeoval which was on the railwayline.

The locality has a population of 94 people as of the 2021 census.
