= Parish of Dubbo =

Dubbo Parish New South Wales
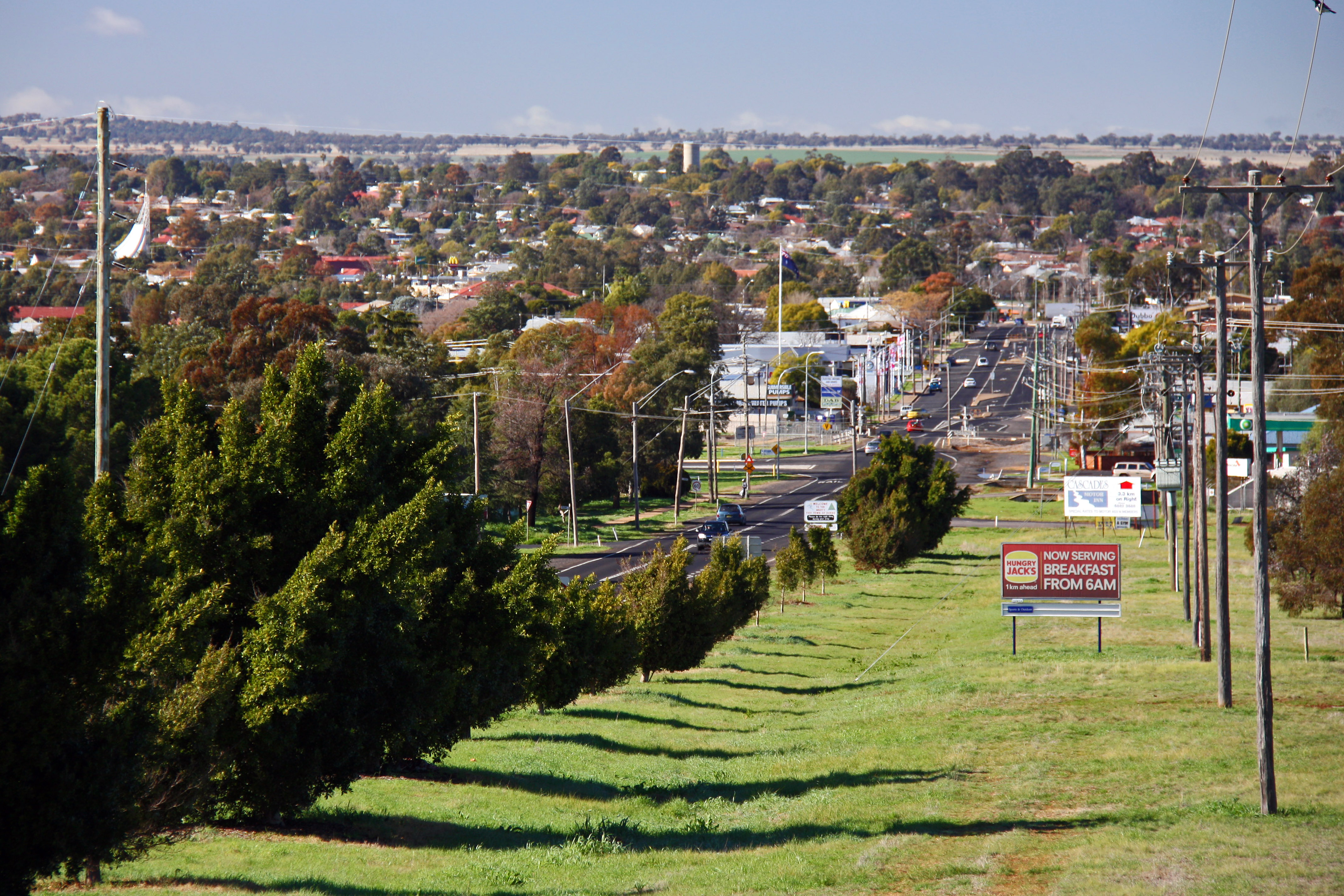
- Overlooking Dubbo from the parish

- Coordinates: 32°15′25″S 148°36′4″E
- Postcode(s): 2830
- Elevation: 275 m (902 ft)
- Time zone: AEST (UTC+10)
  - Summer (DST): AEDT (UTC+11)
- Location: 400 km (249 mi) NW of Sydney
- LGA(s): Dubbo Regional Council
- Region: Central West / Orana
- County: Gordon
- State electorate(s): Dubbo
- Federal division(s): Parkes
Mean max temp	Mean min temp	Annual rainfall
24.3 °C; 76 °F	10.1 °C; 50 °F	551.7 mm 21.7 in

Dubbo Parish (Gordon County), is a civil parish of Gordon County, New South Wales. a Cadastral divisions of New South Wales.

The parish, located in Dubbo Regional Council, features the township of West Dubbo, Taronga Western Plains Zoo and Dubbo Observatory. The Burke Railway line passes through the parish. During World War II an airbase was established in the parish.
