= Little River (Dubbo) =

Coordinates: 32°24′21″S 148°42′01″E

Location
- Country: Australia
- State: New South Wales
- IBRA: South Eastern Highlands
- District: Central West, Orana
- Municipalities: Cabonne, Dubbo, Wellington

Physical characteristics
- Source: Curumbeyenya Range
  - location: between Molong and Parkes
  - elevation: 633 m (2,077 ft)
- Mouth: confluence with the Macquarie River
  - location: west of Geurie
  - elevation: 270 m (890 ft)
- Length: 122 km (76 mi)

Basin features
- River system: Macquarie catchment, Murray–Darling basin

Little River (Dubbo), a watercourse of the Macquarie catchment within the Murray–Darling basin, is located in the central western and Orana districts of New South Wales, Australia.

The river rises in Curumbeyenya Range within Goobang National Park, west of Molong and flows generally north north-east, joined by three minor tributaries, before reaching its confluence with the Macquarie River west of Geurie, descending 363 metres (1,191 ft) over its 122 kilometres (76 mi) course.

== See also ==
- Rivers of New South Wales
- List of rivers of Australia
