= Gordon County, New South Wales =

Gordon New South Wales
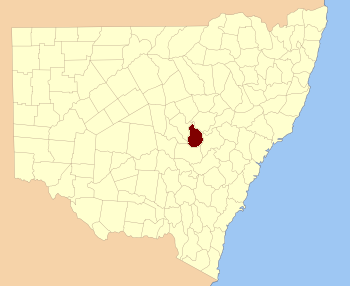
- Location in New South Wales
Lands administrative divisions around Gordon:
| Narromine | Lincoln | Bligh |
| Kennedy | Gordon | Wellington |
| Ashburnham | Ashburnham | Wellington |

Gordon County is one of the 141 cadastral divisions of New South Wales. The Macquarie River is the north-eastern boundary.

Gordon County was named in honour of George Hamilton Gordon, Fourth Earl of Aberdeen (1784–1860).

== Parishes within this county ==
A full list of parishes found within this county; their current LGA and mapping coordinates to the approximate centre of each location is as follows:

| Parish | LGA | Coordinates |
|---|---|---|
| Belmore | Cabonne Shire Council | 32°37′54″S 148°25′04″E |
| Benolong | Dubbo Regional Council | 32°25′54″S 148°39′04″E |
| Benya | Cabonne Shire Council | 32°57′54″S 148°33′04″E |
| Bolderogery | Cabonne Shire Council | 32°48′54″S 148°36′04″E |
| Buckinbah | Cabonne Shire Council | 32°47′54″S 148°40′04″E |
| Burgoon | Cabonne Shire Council | 32°51′54″S 148°38′04″E |
| Burrawong | Cabonne Shire Council | 32°50′54″S 148°44′04″E |
| Caloma | Dubbo Regional Council | 32°29′54″S 148°30′04″E |
| Cardington | Cabonne Shire Council | 32°50′54″S 148°55′04″E |
| Catombal | Dubbo Regional Council | 32°47′54″S 148°49′04″E |
| Cullen | Dubbo Regional Council | 32°25′54″S 148°24′04″E |
| Curra | Dubbo Regional Council | 32°36′54″S 148°54′04″E |
| Dilga | Cabonne Shire Council | 32°56′54″S 148°40′04″E |
| Draway | Dubbo Regional Council | 32°35′54″S 148°35′04″E |
| Dubbo | Dubbo Regional Council | 32°13′54″S 148°35′04″E |
| Eurimbula | Cabonne Shire Council | 32°53′54″S 148°49′04″E |
| Ganoo | Dubbo Regional Council | 32°39′54″S 148°41′04″E |
| Gilgal | Dubbo Regional Council | 32°31′54″S 148°38′04″E |
| Gullengambel | Dubbo Regional Council | 32°36′54″S 148°32′04″E |
| Gundy | Dubbo Regional Council | 32°34′54″S 148°51′04″E |
| Hyandra | Cabonne Shire Council | 32°52′54″S 148°26′04″E |
| Loombah | Dubbo Regional Council | 32°45′54″S 148°44′04″E |
| Narragal | Dubbo Regional Council | 32°46′54″S 148°57′04″E |
| Neurea | Dubbo Regional Council | 32°46′54″S 148°53′04″E |
| Obley | Cabonne Shire Council | 32°44′54″S 148°36′04″E |
| Oxley | Dubbo Regional Council | 32°25′54″S 148°32′04″E |
| Ponto | Dubbo Regional Council | 32°30′54″S 148°49′04″E |
| Redbank | Dubbo Regional Council | 32°34′54″S 148°44′04″E |
| Roche | Dubbo Regional Council | 32°30′54″S 148°33′04″E |
| Rocky Ponds | Cabonne Shire Council | 31°59′54″S 148°30′04″E |
| Strathorn | Cabonne Shire Council | 32°44′54″S 148°23′04″E |
| Terrabella | Dubbo Regional Council | 32°28′54″S 148°45′04″E |
| The Gap | Cabonne Shire Council | 32°56′54″S 148°45′04″E |
| The Springs | Dubbo Regional Council | 32°29′54″S 148°39′04″E |
| Veech | Dubbo Regional Council | 32°40′54″S 148°46′04″E |
| Wagstaff | Cabonne Shire Council | 32°46′54″S 148°31′04″E |
| Wandawandong | Cabonne Shire Council | 32°44′54″S 148°32′04″E |
| Warraberry | Cabonne Shire Council | 32°53′54″S 148°33′04″E |
| Whylandra | Dubbo Regional Council | 32°20′54″S 148°34′04″E |
