= Bell River (New South Wales) =

Coordinates: 32°33′S 148°57′E

Bell River Nandillion Ponds
- Etymology: in honour of Brevet Major Bell

Location
- Country: Australia
- State: New South Wales
- IBRA: South Eastern Highlands, NSW South Western Slopes
- District: Central West
- Municipalities: Cabonne, Wellington

Physical characteristics
- Source: Ploughman's Creek
  - location: March, near Orange
  - elevation: 726 m (2,382 ft)
- 2nd source: Broken Shaft Creek
- Mouth: Macquarie River
  - location: Wellington
  - elevation: 285 m (935 ft)
- Length: 146 km (91 mi)

Basin features
- River system: Murray–Darling Basin
- Tributaries
  - left: Molong Creek, Curra Creek, Blathery Creek
  - right: Nubrigan Creek, Weandre Creek, Kerrs Creek

Bell River, a watercourse that is part of the Macquarie catchment within the Murray–Darling basin, is located in the central west region of New South Wales, Australia.

== Course ==
The river rises in the hills north-west of Orange and flows generally north past the town of Molong, joining the Macquarie River at Wellington. The course of the river is generally aligned with the Mitchell Highway, with the river dropping 441 metres (1,447 ft) over its 146 kilometres (91 mi) course.

Platypus have often been sighted in the lower reaches of the Bell River.

== History ==
=== Aboriginal history ===
The original inhabitants of the land surrounding the Bell River were Australian Aborigines of the Wiradjuri clan.

=== European history ===
The area surrounding the Bell River was first explored by John Oxley who named the river in honour of Brevet Major Bell.

Alluvial gold was discovered in and along the river in 1851, inspiring a minor gold rush, most notably near the confluence of the Nubrigyn Creek with the Bell River.

Minor flooding of the Bell River occurs sporadically, before its junction with the Macquarie River, including in 1920, 1926, and 1990 at Newrea, where the river reached 6.77 metres (22.2 ft).
