= Molong =

- Town
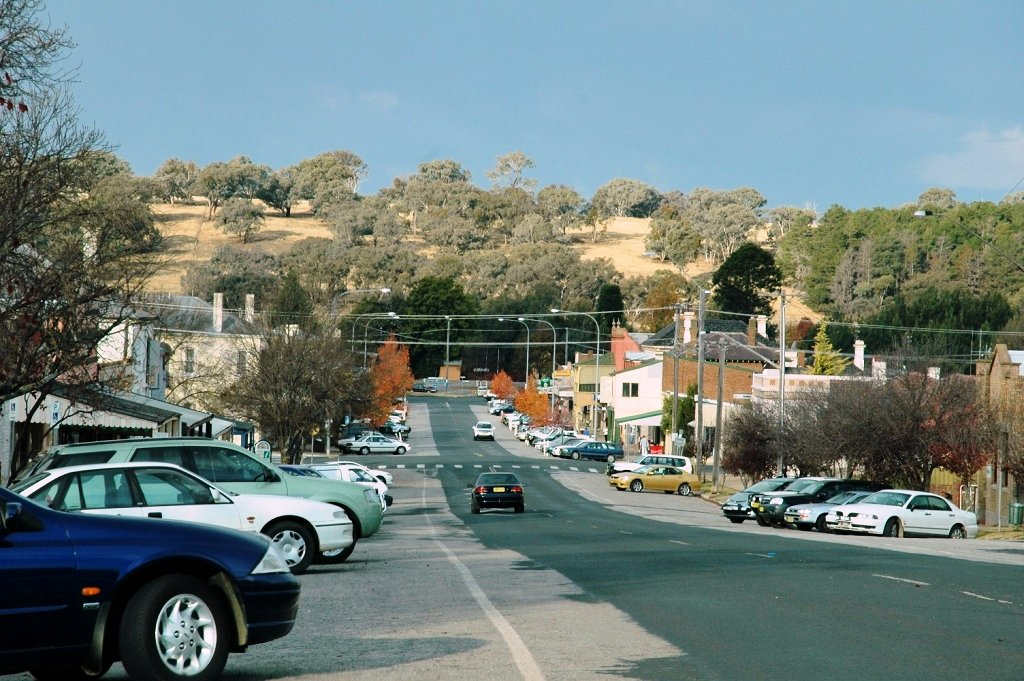
- The main shopping area of Molong, Bank Street

- Coordinates: 33°06′0″S 148°51′0″E
- Country: Australia
- State: New South Wales
- LGA: Cabonne Shire Council
- Location: 296 km (184 mi) W of Sydney; 36 km (22 mi) NW of Orange; 65 km (40 mi) S of Wellington; 24 km (15 mi) SW of Cumnock
- Established: 1849

Government
  - State electorate: Orange
  - Federal division: Calare
- Elevation: 565 m (1,854 ft)

Population
  - Total: 1,621 (UCL 2021)
- Postcode: 2866
- Mean max temp: 22.3 °C (72.1 °F)
- Mean min temp: 6.2 °C (43.2 °F)
- Annual rainfall: 707.7 mm (27.86 in)

Molong is a small town in the Central West region of New South Wales, Australia, in Cabonne Shire.

== History ==
The name Molong comes from the Aboriginal word for 'all rocks'.

William Lee of Kelso is said to have had cattle in the area by 1819. He later held property just north of present Molong, around Larras Lee. In 1826, a military and police outpost was established at Molong, on Governor Darling's orders, as a step in opening up the government stock reserve west of the Macquarie River for settlement. For its first twenty years the settlement was at a site approximately 1.5 km (0.93 mi) east of the current location. The present village of Molong was officially gazetted in March 1849. In 1845, Copper was discovered at Copper Hill, just north of the town.

The Historical Museum is housed in a former hotel (1856), built by rubble-mason James Mortal, who sold it in 1861 to John Smith of Gamboola. Smith let the building to a series of publicans and it later became the residence and surgery for a series of doctors. The Historical Society acquired it for use as a museum, in 1969, with help from the Molong Shire Council.

In November 2022 many of the town's buildings were damaged in a flood.

== Heritage listings ==
Molong has a number of heritage-listed sites, including:

- Main Western railway: Molong railway station
- 3 km (1.9 mi) SE of Molong Yuranigh Road: Grave of Yuranigh

== Geography ==
Molong is located on the Mitchell Highway about 300 kilometres (190 mi) west of Sydney and about 30 kilometres (19 mi) from the city of Orange, and an elevation of 529 metres above sea level. At the 2021 census, Molong had a population of 1,621 people. Charles Sturt visited Molong in 1828. Molong was the site of an early copper mine in Australia, located at Copper Hill just outside Molong.

The railway from Sydney reached Molong in 1886; it was later extended to Parkes. A branch railway to Dubbo was opened in 1925 and closed in 1987.

=== Climate ===
Despite Molong's elevation, it still manages to have a humid subtropical climate (Cfa) due to its northern latitude, having warm to hot summers and cool to cold winters with the odd snowfall. While mean temperatures have been recorded since 1907 at the site, extreme temperature records are found only between 1957 and 1975.

Perhaps the most extreme weather event to have affected Molong since European colonisation was the snowfall on 5 July 1900, having fallen to a depth of 1 ft 3 in (38 cm) in town, with snow drifts in some areas reported to an exceptional depth of 11 ft (3.4 m).

Climate data for Molong (Hill St, 1907–1975, rainfall 1884–2022); 565 m AMSL; 33.09° S, 148.86° E
Month	Jan	Feb	Mar	Apr	May	Jun	Jul	Aug	Sep	Oct	Nov	Dec	Year
Record high °C (°F)	42.3 (108.1)	40.0 (104.0)	37.8 (100.0)	32.8 (91.0)	27.2 (81.0)	23.3 (73.9)	21.7 (71.1)	25.7 (78.3)	32.8 (91.0)	33.9 (93.0)	37.8 (100.0)	40.3 (104.5)	42.3 (108.1)
Mean daily maximum °C (°F)	31.0 (87.8)	30.1 (86.2)	27.5 (81.5)	22.5 (72.5)	17.4 (63.3)	14.0 (57.2)	12.9 (55.2)	14.7 (58.5)	18.6 (65.5)	22.6 (72.7)	26.4 (79.5)	29.5 (85.1)	22.3 (72.1)
Mean daily minimum °C (°F)	13.3 (55.9)	13.2 (55.8)	10.3 (50.5)	6.0 (42.8)	2.8 (37.0)	0.9 (33.6)	−0.1 (31.8)	0.6 (33.1)	2.4 (36.3)	5.4 (41.7)	8.4 (47.1)	11.4 (52.5)	6.2 (43.2)
Record low °C (°F)	3.4 (38.1)	2.2 (36.0)	0.6 (33.1)	−2.9 (26.8)	−6.7 (19.9)	−7.8 (18.0)	−8.8 (16.2)	−7.2 (19.0)	−4.4 (24.1)	−4.4 (24.1)	−0.6 (30.9)	1.7 (35.1)	−8.8 (16.2)
Average precipitation mm (inches)	69.8 (2.75)	57.0 (2.24)	58.2 (2.29)	51.4 (2.02)	52.3 (2.06)	59.9 (2.36)	59.4 (2.34)	61.5 (2.42)	54.0 (2.13)	58.4 (2.30)	60.6 (2.39)	64.1 (2.52)	707.7 (27.86)
Average precipitation days (≥ 0.2 mm)	6.6	5.7	5.7	5.4	7.3	9.6	10.4	9.5	8.2	7.9	6.8	6.5	89.6
Source: Australian Bureau of Meteorology

Historical population
Year	Pop.	±%
1921	1,503	—
1933	1,531	+1.9%
1947	1,662	+8.6%
1954	1,791	+7.8%
1961	1,655	−7.6%
1966	1,430	−13.6%
1971	1,383	−3.3%
1976	1,504	+8.7%
1981	1,374	−8.6%
1986	1,400	+1.9%
1991	1,563	+11.6%
1996	1,604	+2.6%
2001	1,560	−2.7%
2006	1,569	+0.6%
2011	1,629	+3.8%
2016	1,674	+2.8%
2021	1,621	−3.2%
Source: Australian Bureau of Statistics data.

== Education ==
- Molong Central School
- St Joseph's Catholic Schools
