= Molong–Dubbo railway line =

Former railway line in New South Wales, Australia

The Molong–Dubbo railway line is an inactive railway line in western New South Wales, Australia. It branched off the Broken Hill line at Molong and paralleled the Main West line before rejoining it at Dubbo. The line was designed with gentler grades than the steeper section of the Main Western line via Wellington, but this resulted in it taking a meandering course (131 km in length for a point-to point distance of 85 km).

The line is particularly scenic, and comprised several steel bridges and some significant engineering works. The New South Wales Government Railways had intentions for it to become the mainline to Dubbo. The line was approved in 1916, but the First World War saw its construction delayed until 1920. It opened in 1925 with expectations of high traffic as ten crossing loops and significant attended passenger station facilities and sophisticated train control and an automatic signalling systems were provided; however, the line never operated to its designed capacity.

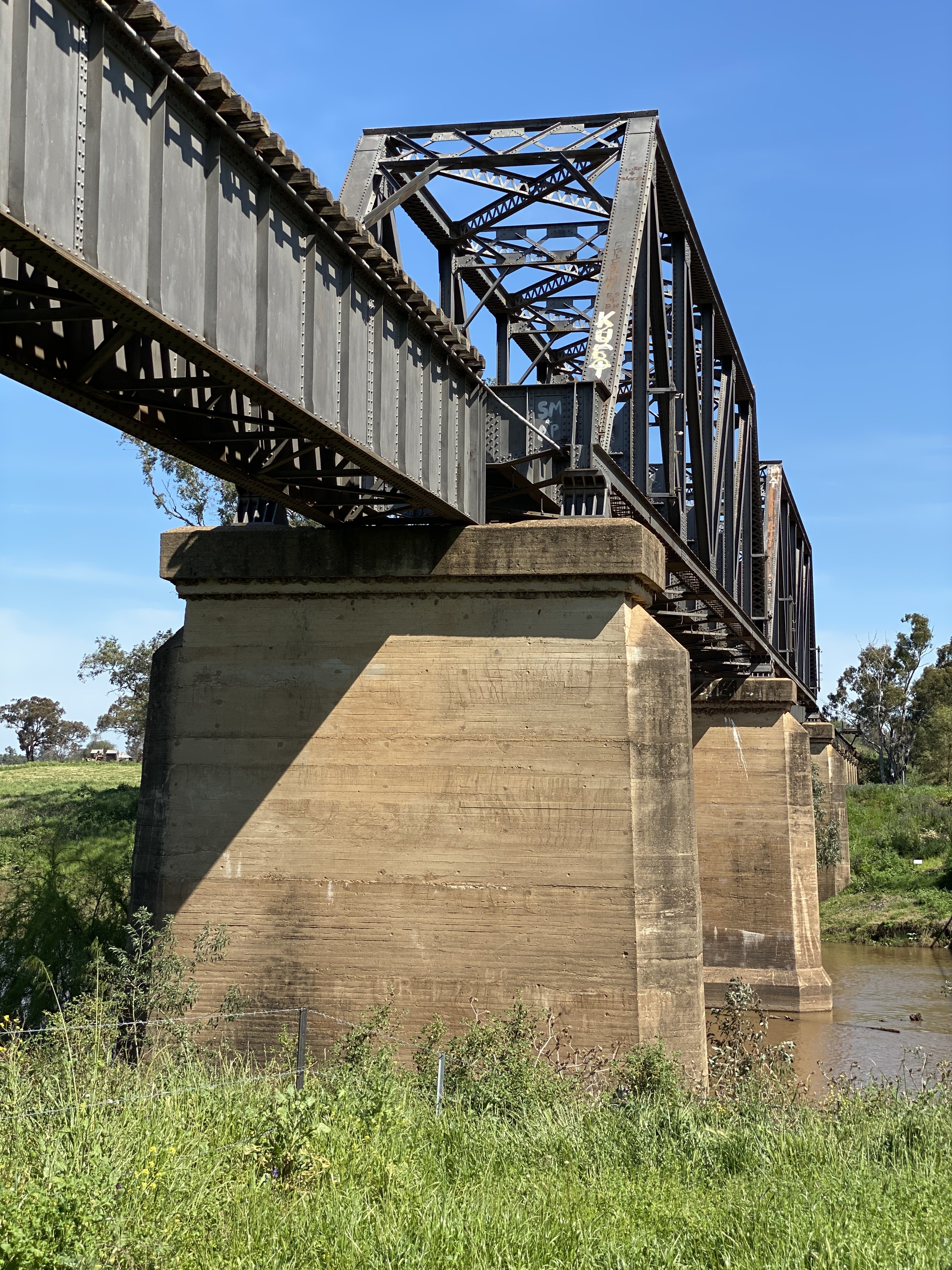
Northern end of the Dundullimal Railway Bridge in Dubbo

The signalling system was subsequently simplified and safe-working was altered to electric staff with divisible staffs and midsection automatic signals to protect trains travelling on the ticket portion of a divisible staff and taking water at Loombah and Little River. Train control was moved to Dubbo.

Passenger services were operated by CPH railmotors between 1932 and 1974, with the occasional diversion of other mainline trains over the line. The rail motor was withdrawn in September 1974 along with many other branch services during a nationwide fuel crisis. The line saw considerable grain haulage however, but the general freight downturn in the 1980s, the opening of the Ulan line and the diversion of western grain for export from Glebe Island to Bullock Island (via Merrygoen) and to Port Kembla (via Stockinbingal) and a transfer of some local grain haulage to road transport saw the line's demise, and it was truncated north of Yeoval in 1987 with the remainder officially closed in 1993.

In 2012, Alkane Resources expressed an interest in upgrading and opening the line for transporting goods and ore to and from its Rare Earth Mine, 30 km south of Dubbo, at Toongi. The cost of upgrading this section of line was estimated at A$30 million. In April 2013, Alkane announced that its studies into the reactivation of this part of the line were 'well advanced'.

== See also ==
- Rail transport in New South Wales
