= Wellington, New South Wales =

Wellington
- Town
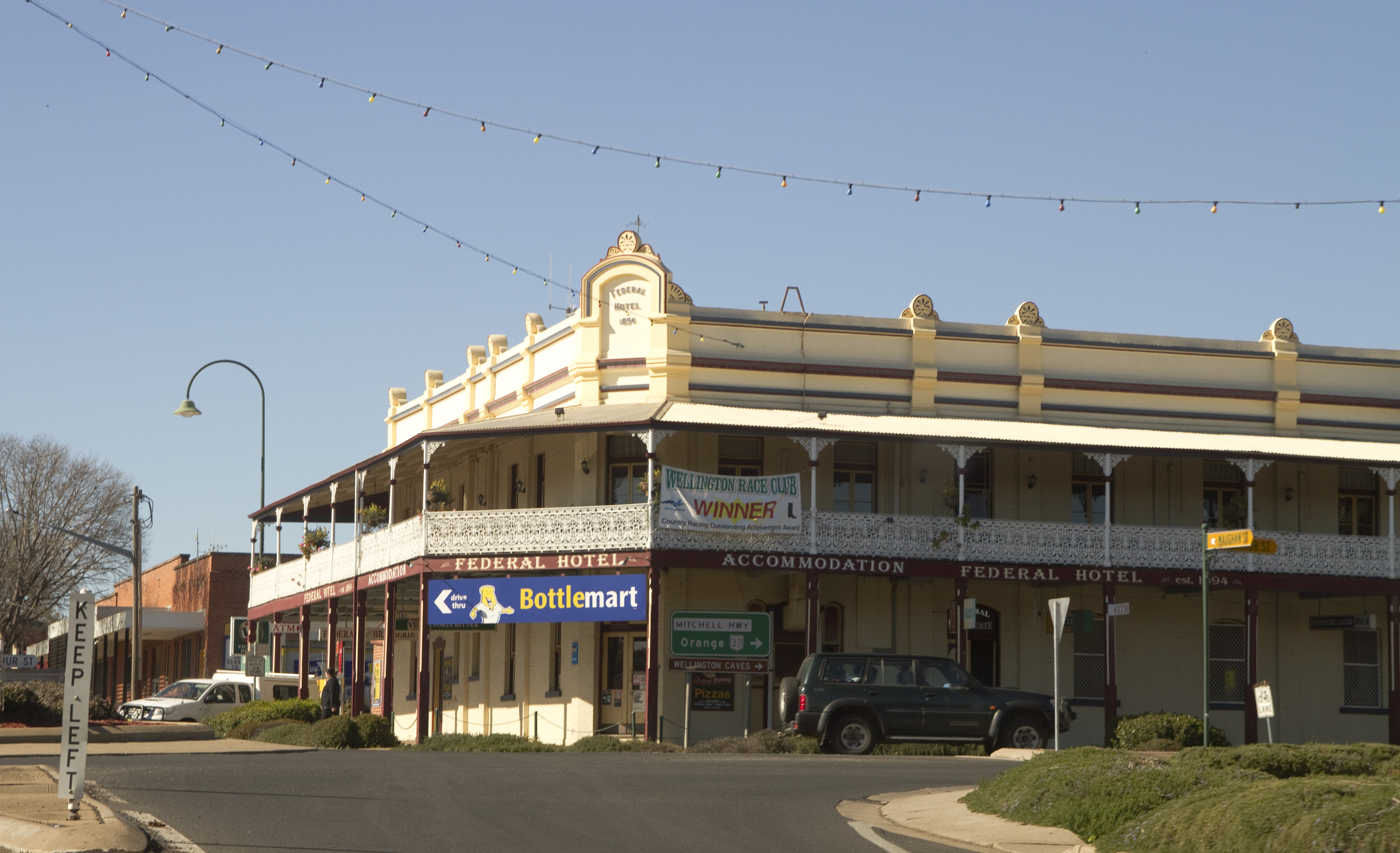
- The Federal Hotel, Wellington (erected in 1894)

- Coordinates: 32°33′0″S 148°56′0″E
- Country: Australia
- State: New South Wales
- LGA: Dubbo Regional Council
- Location: 360 km (220 mi) WNW of Sydney; 49 km (30 mi) SE of Dubbo; 100 km (62 mi) N of Orange; 92 km (57 mi) W of Mudgee

Government
  - State electorate: Dubbo
  - Federal division: Parkes
- Elevation: 305 m (1,001 ft)

Population
  - Total: 5,011 (2021 census)
- Postcode: 2820
- County: Wellington
- Mean max temp: 24.4 °C (75.9 °F)
- Mean min temp: 9.4 °C (48.9 °F)
- Annual rainfall: 620.1 mm (24.41 in)

Wellington is a town in the Central Western Slopes region of New South Wales, Australia, located at the junction of the Macquarie (Wambuul) and Bell rivers. It is within the local government area of Dubbo Regional Council. The town is situated on the Mitchell Highway and the Great Western Railway, and is southeast of Dubbo, the main centre of the Central Western Slopes region.

Wellington was the second European settlement west of the Blue Mountains, first established as a convict establishment in 1823.

== History ==
=== Aboriginal history ===
The area now known as Wellington lies on the traditional lands of the Wiradjuri people.

The 'Wambuul' (Macquarie River) was an important source of sustenance for this widespread Aboriginal group united by kinship and a common language. Surviving evidence in the Wellington area of the occupation by the Wiradjuri people prior to European contact includes rock shelters with archaeological deposits, a carved tree, scarred trees, open camp sites, grinding grooves sites and bora (ceremonial) grounds.

The city still has a strong Aboriginal presence, largely as a result of early missionary settlements set up there, other Aboriginal campsites, such as the Wellington Common, and, from 1910, the Nanima Aboriginal Reserve, all of which kept local people residing in the area.

In 2007, a group of Wiradjuri people won a Native Title claim, over the area known as the Wellington Common, where many Wiradjuri lived, and that land was returned to its traditional owners.

=== European exploration ===
The European discovery of the Wellington Valley occurred during the return journey of John Oxley's Lachlan River expedition in 1817. While crossing from the Bogan River to the Macquarie River in August 1817 Oxley and his party happened upon the Wellington Valley with the Bell River running through it. They followed the river to its junction with the Macquarie. Oxley was effusive about the valley, describing it as “beautifully picturesque” and “studded with fine trees upon a soil which may be equalled, but can never be excelled”. The Bell River was named “as a compliment to Brevet Major Bell of the 48th Regiment” and the Wellington Valley was named after the Duke of Wellington.

=== Convict outpost ===
In January 1823 Lieutenant Percy Simpson was appointed by the colonial government to establish a settlement at the junction of the Bell and Macquarie rivers in the Wellington Valley. Simpson and a party of soldiers and convicts arrived at the locality via Bathurst in February with 12 cows and 40 sheep, as well as a provision of wheat. Simpson chose a site for the settlement on high ground above the Bell River (about three kilometres south of the modern cityship). There were early problems, including desertions and stock theft by convicts, but fields of wheat and other staples were eventually established. A muster roll in 1826 recorded 85 men at Wellington. By that stage a number of pastoral runs had been established in the vicinity of the settlement and along the Macquarie River. The convict outpost at Wellington was discontinued in 1831 and "the settlement was used for a time as a Government stock station". A traveller to the area in 1832 described the settlement as “abandoned” except for “a dozen stockmen and soldiers who remained to protect the buildings from the mischievous spoilation of the natives”.

=== Missionary settlement ===
In December 1831 the secretary of state for the colonies informed Governor Bourke that an agreement had been entered into with the Church Missionary Society in England “by which the organisation had undertaken to send out and superintend a mission to the natives”. Permission was sought to “establish the Mission at Wellington Valley”, to which the Governor agreed, authorising them to “occupy the Government buildings there and to use for grazing any land they desired to occupy for that purpose”. The missionaries sent to Wellington in 1832 were Rev. William Watson and Rev. James Handt, a Lutheran clergyman.

In 1835 Messrs. Backhouse and Walter, both Quakers, visited the Mission. Backhouse reported that ”the blacks at the station were not numerous”, with “about 30” being the usual number living there. The Aborigines were said to be “very capricious” and “by no means desirous to learn”. They were “attracted” to the food supplied by the Mission and “they were not disposed to work”. A mission report in 1836 stated that “the vocabulary of the native language had been revised and enlarged” and that “services were held in the language”.

Rev. Handt left Wellington in 1836 “as his wife was ill”. Rev. James Gunther and his wife arrived in August 1837, replacing Handt and his wife.

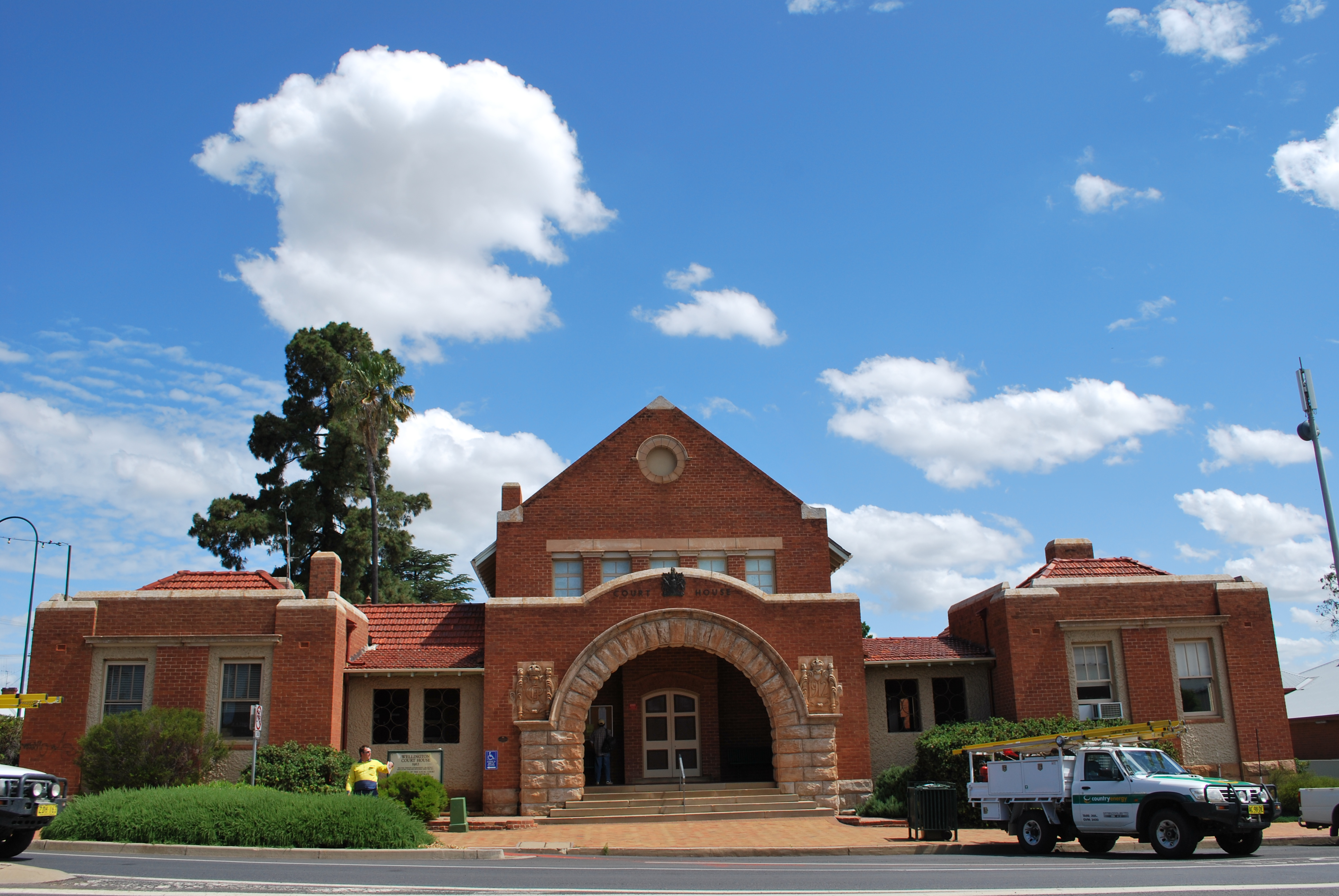
Wellington Courthouse.

=== Wellington cityship ===
In 1840, a village called Montefiores was established on the north side of the Macquarie River crossing. The city of Wellington, on the south bank of the Macquarie River opposite Montefiores, was gazetted in 1846, and on 20 March 1885, Wellington was proclaimed a city.

The first local government body covering Wellington was the Wellington Municipal District, proclaimed in 1879. In 1950 it was amalgamated with Macquarie Shire and part of Cobbora Shire to form Wellington Shire. There was a number of transfer of areas with adjoining shires, and in 2016 Wellington Shire was amalgamated with the local government area of Dubbo City to form Western Plains Regional Council.

Wellington is the second oldest New South Wales settlement west of the Blue Mountains. One of its hotels, the Lion of Waterloo, established by Nicolas Hyeronimus in 1842, is the oldest operating west of the Blue Mountains.

Near to The Lion of Waterloo is the location of the last recorded duel fought on Australian soil, in 1854.

As a regional centre Wellington benefited by the development of the gold mining industry in the district from the 1850s. Initially this was working alluvial deposits of gold but later focused on the mining of quartz reefs. Among the mining districts was Mitchells Creek located 8 miles to the north east near the locality of Bodangora. In the first decade of the 20th century, there was a revival of gold mining in the area, when gold dredges operated on the Macquarie River near Wellington.

The extension of the Great Western Railway from Orange to Wellington opened on 1 June 1880. The line was subsequently extended to Dubbo in February 1881.

Historical population
Year	Pop.	±%
1921	3,924	—
1933	4,320	+10.1%
1947	4,723	+9.3%
1954	5,143	+8.9%
1961	5,599	+8.9%
1966	5,853	+4.5%
1971	5,536	−5.4%
1976	5,395	−2.5%
1981	5,280	−2.1%
1986	5,277	−0.1%
1991	5,433	+3.0%
1996	4,920	−9.4%
2001	4,672	−5.0%
2006	4,660	−0.3%
2011	4,540	−2.6%
2016	4,519	−0.5%
2021	4,581	+1.4%
Source: Australian Bureau of Statistics data.

== Heritage listings ==
Wellington has a number of heritage-listed sites, including:

- 9 Amaroo Drive: John Fowler 7nhp Steam Road Locomotive
- Curtis Street: Wellington Convict and Mission Site
- 21 Maughan Street: Wellington Post Office
- University Road: Blacks Camp

== Economy ==
Wellington is the centre of rich agricultural land. While alfalfa and vegetables are grown on lands on the river, wheat, wool, lambs and beef cattle are grown on surrounding pastures. The city acts as a commercial centre for the surrounding district.

In September 2008, the Wellington Correctional Centre was opened. A Probation and Parole Office was also opened in the centre of city.

== Media ==
The local newspaper The Wellington Times, a Rural Press title, is published three times a week with a circulation in the region of around 1000. The Wellington Times is no longer published the town has a paper 'The Wellington & District Leader' There is a popular Community Radio Station operating on a frequency of 91.5 MHz FM.

== Climate ==
Wellington possesses a humid subtropical climate (Köppen: Cfa), with hot summers and cool winters. Average maxima vary from 33.0 °C (91.4 °F) in January to 15.3 °C (59.5 °F) in July, while average minima fluctuate between 17.1 °C (62.8 °F) in January and 2.2 °C (36.0 °F) in July. Annual precipitation is moderately low (averaging 620.1 mm (24.41 in)), and is spread across 76.4 precipitation days. The town is rather sunny, experiencing 138.1 clear days and 91.9 cloudy days per annum. Extreme temperatures have ranged from 45.0 °C (113.0 °F) on 11 February 2017 to −5.7 °C (21.7 °F) on 25 June 1971 and on 20 July 1982.

Climate data for Wellington (32.56°S 148.95°E, 305 m AMSL) (1881–2024 normals, extremes 1965–2024)
Month	Jan	Feb	Mar	Apr	May	Jun	Jul	Aug	Sep	Oct	Nov	Dec	Year
Record high °C (°F)	44.0 (111.2)	45.0 (113.0)	39.8 (103.6)	33.9 (93.0)	27.5 (81.5)	26.0 (78.8)	24.0 (75.2)	28.8 (83.8)	33.4 (92.1)	39.5 (103.1)	43.0 (109.4)	44.4 (111.9)	45.0 (113.0)
Mean daily maximum °C (°F)	33.0 (91.4)	32.1 (89.8)	29.4 (84.9)	24.6 (76.3)	19.8 (67.6)	16.0 (60.8)	15.3 (59.5)	17.1 (62.8)	20.8 (69.4)	24.9 (76.8)	28.5 (83.3)	31.6 (88.9)	24.4 (76.0)
Mean daily minimum °C (°F)	17.1 (62.8)	16.7 (62.1)	14.1 (57.4)	9.5 (49.1)	5.7 (42.3)	3.5 (38.3)	2.2 (36.0)	3.0 (37.4)	5.4 (41.7)	8.6 (47.5)	12.3 (54.1)	15.1 (59.2)	9.4 (49.0)
Record low °C (°F)	6.5 (43.7)	6.5 (43.7)	1.7 (35.1)	−1.0 (30.2)	−3.9 (25.0)	−5.7 (21.7)	−5.7 (21.7)	−4.6 (23.7)	−3.0 (26.6)	−2.0 (28.4)	1.6 (34.9)	3.2 (37.8)	−5.7 (21.7)
Average precipitation mm (inches)	60.3 (2.37)	51.2 (2.02)	51.8 (2.04)	45.7 (1.80)	46.4 (1.83)	50.8 (2.00)	49.0 (1.93)	48.8 (1.92)	44.8 (1.76)	56.6 (2.23)	58.7 (2.31)	56.1 (2.21)	620.1 (24.41)
Average precipitation days (≥ 0.2 mm)	5.6	5.1	5.2	4.7	6.2	8.0	8.3	7.8	6.6	6.7	6.3	5.9	76.4
Average afternoon relative humidity (%)	36	39	41	44	53	57	55	50	46	42	38	34	45
Average dew point °C (°F)	12.8 (55.0)	13.5 (56.3)	12.1 (53.8)	9.5 (49.1)	8.2 (46.8)	6.5 (43.7)	5.0 (41.0)	4.8 (40.6)	6.5 (43.7)	8.1 (46.6)	9.3 (48.7)	10.4 (50.7)	8.9 (48.0)
Mean monthly sunshine hours	288.3	257.1	248.0	243.0	217.0	156.0	186.0	223.2	258.0	266.6	276.0	282.1	2,901.3
Percentage possible sunshine	66	69	65	72	67	52	59	66	72	67	67	64	66
Source: Bureau of Meteorology (1881–2024 normals, extremes 1965–2024)

== Transport links ==
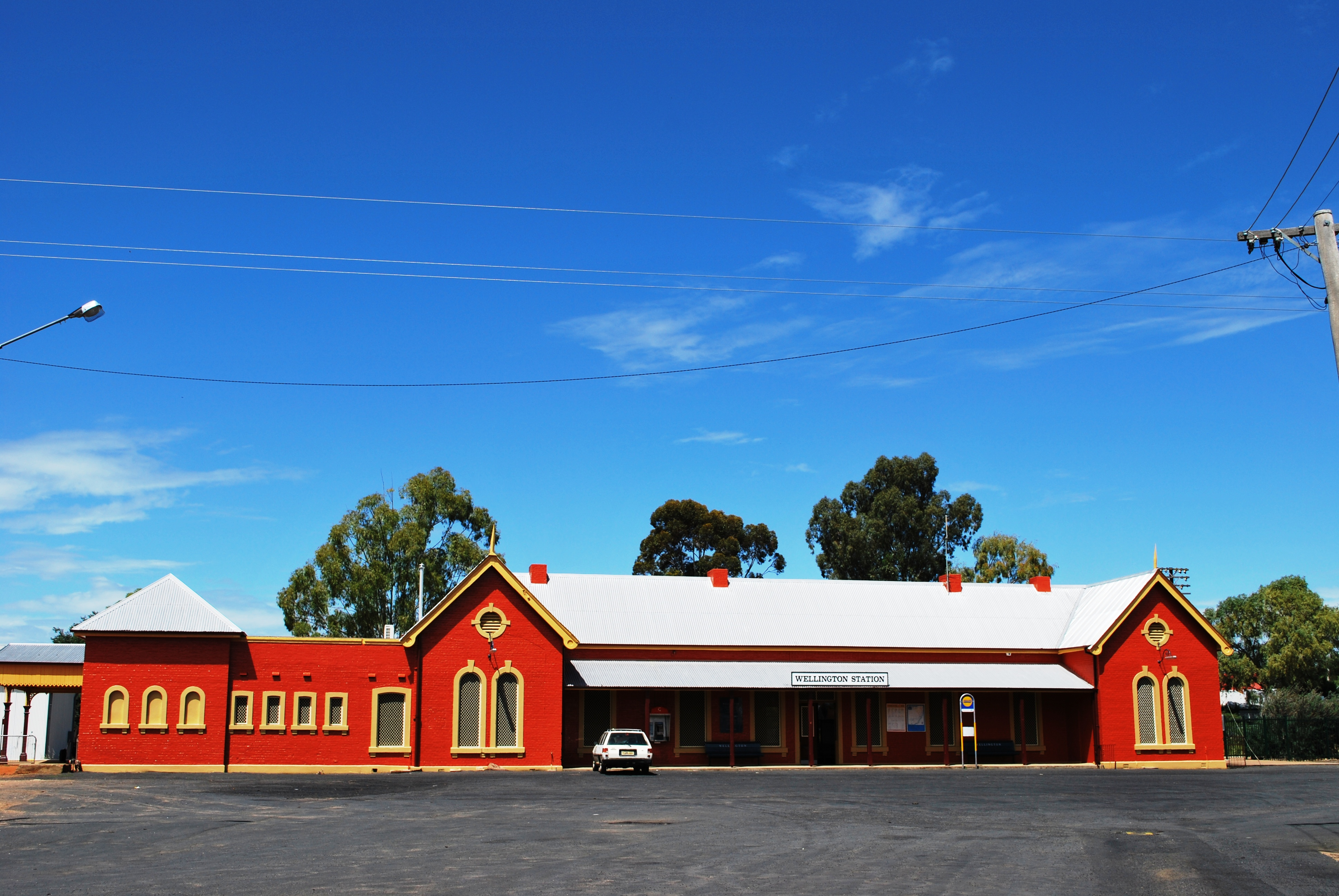
Wellington railway station

Wellington station is served by a daily NSW TrainLink XPT service which runs between Sydney and Dubbo.

The closest commercial airport is Dubbo Regional Airport. QantasLink and Rex Airlines service the airport three-five times daily from Sydney. Bodangora Airport for general aviation aircraft is located twelve kilometres east of Wellington.

Ogden's Coaches operates return services to Dubbo, with one extending to Narromine as a through-routed service with the Narromine link.

== Nearby attractions ==
Lake Burrendong, a man-made lake, is located 30 kilometres south of the city. Its capacity is three and a half times that of Sydney Harbour and supplies water for irrigation schemes downstream. It is also a popular location for anglers, sailors and water skiers. Burrendong Arboretum is a sanctuary for endangered Australian flora and covers 1.60 km^{2}.

The nearby Wellington Caves feature the Cathedral Cave with the massive Altar Rock and has a viewable underground river running at the bottom. Immediately to the East of the cityship lies the Catombal Range with magnificent bushwalks in and around Mt Arthur and Mt Wellesley.

The Wellington Boot, a country racing festival is held in March and April annually. The Bell River Wine Estate is nearby.

== Notable residents ==
- Ben Austin – Paralympian, grew up in Wellington
- Millicent Bryant – first woman in Australia to earn a pilot licence, born at Apsley, Wellington.
- Max Cullen – actor
- Silvanus Daniel – politician
- Terry Fahey – former professional rugby league footballer for South Sydney Rabbitohs, Eastern Suburbs and Canberra Raiders
- Blake Ferguson – Former NRL player
- Nicolas Hyeronimus – pioneering innkeeper, merchant, pastoralist and inaugural MLA for Wellington
- Media stars John Laws, Laurie Oakes and Ray Martin all lived in Wellington
- Colleen McCullough – author, born in Wellington
- Brent Naden – NRL Player, born in Wellington
- Ian O'Brien – Olympic gold medalist in the 200 m breaststroke at the 1964 Summer Olympics, grew up in Wellington
- Tyrone Peachey – NRL player.
- Trent Runciman – Former NRL player
- Paul Shaw – former professional rugby league player for Manly Sea Eagles and Gold Coast Seagulls
- Kotoni Staggs – NRL player for the Brisbane Broncos
- Tim Storrier – Award-winning artist.
- Ray "Gunner" Kelly MBE – was an Australian police officer who was a detective inspector with NSW Police, he became famous during his career owing to his high-profile cases and results, but who was later alleged to have been deeply involved in corruption and organised crime.
- Jack Renshaw – NSW Premier 1964–1965, born in Wellington.
