= City of Dubbo =

Former local government area in New South Wales, Australia

- Local government area
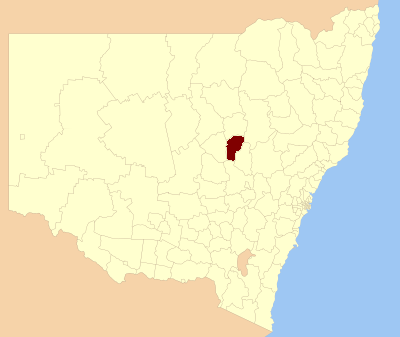
- Location in New South Wales

- Coordinates: 32°15′S 148°36′E
- Country: Australia
- State: New South Wales
- Region: Orana
- Established: 1872
- Abolished: 12 May 2016
- Council seat: Dubbo

Government
  - State electorate: Dubbo
  - Federal division: Parkes

Area
  - Total: 3,425 km^{2} (1,322 sq mi)

Population
  - Total: 41,211 (2011 census)
  - Density: 12.0324/km^{2} (31.164/sq mi)
- Website: City of Dubbo
LGAs around City of Dubbo
Narromine	Gilgandra	Warrumbungle
Narromine	City of Dubbo	Wellington
Parkes	Parkes	Wellington

The City of Dubbo was a local government area in the Orana region of New South Wales, Australia. The former area is located adjacent to the Mitchell, Newell, and the Golden highways, the Main Western railway line, and the Macquarie River.

A 2015 review of local government boundaries recommended that the City of Dubbo merge with the Wellington Council to form a new council with an area of 7,536 square kilometres (2,910 sq mi) and support a population of approximately 51,000. Following an independent review, on 12 May 2016 the Minister for Local Government announced the dissolution of the Dubbo City Council and the Wellington Council, together with the establishment of the Western Plains Regional Council with immediate effect.

The last mayor of the City of Dubbo was Clr. Mathew Dickerson, an independent politician.

The last deputy mayor of the City of Dubbo was Clr. Ben Shields, an unaligned politician. Clr. Ben Shields was elected in 1st position at the 2012 and 2008 Dubbo City Council elections.

The largest population centre in the former area is the regional city of Dubbo. The local government area also included the villages of Eumungerie, Mogriguy, Brocklehurst, Wongarbon, Toongi, and Rawsonville.

== History ==
The Dubbo local government area came into being on 19 February 1872, when the Municipal District of Dubbo was approved by the Colonial Secretary. The first six aldermen were elected into office on 22 April 1872 with 82 votes being cast for a wide field of candidates. James Samuels was elected mayor at the first council meeting and remained mayor for 3 years.

Talbragar Shire was amalgamated with the Dubbo City Council on 1 April 1980. At that time the area of the city was 3,321 square kilometres (1,282 sq mi); and with a population estimated at 29,000.

== Council ==
=== Current composition and election method ===
Prior to its dissolution, the Dubbo City Council was composed of eleven councillors elected proportionally as a single ward. All Councillors were elected for a fixed four-year term of office. The mayor was elected by the councillors at the first meeting of the council. The most recent election was held on 8 September 2012, and the makeup of the former council was as follows:

Party	Councillors
Independents and Unaligned	11
Total	11

The last Council, elected in 2012 and dissolved in 2016, in order of election, was:

Councillor	Party	Notes
Ben Shields	Unaligned	Deputy Mayor
Mathew Dickerson	Independent	Mayor
John Walkom	Unaligned	
Bill Kelly	Independent	
Greg Mohr	Unaligned	Elected on Ben Shields ticket
Allan Smith	Independent	
Kevin Parker	Unaligned	
Tina Reynolds	Independent	
Greg Mathews	Unaligned	
Lyn Griffiths	Independent	
Rod Towney	Independent	

The former Dubbo City Council staffed around 350 permanent employees, and was responsible for the city and surrounding areas. The Civic Administration Building of the former council is located on the corner of Darling and Church Streets and now has a "One Stop Shop" for all customers of the former council.

== Industry ==
As a regional centre, the City of Dubbo provided services far beyond its own population base. It served 130,000 people, and one third of the geographic area of New South Wales. The main industry sectors represented in the City of Dubbo were retail, health, manufacturing, transport, tourism, education, construction, business services, agriculture, and government services.

== Twin towns – sister cities ==
Dubbo's sister cities are:

- Minokamo, Japan
- Toyama, Japan
- Wujiang (Suzhou), China
