= John Fowler 7nhp Steam Road Locomotive =

- Location within New South Wales Location within Australia
- 32°34′30″S 148°57′22″E
- Location: 9 Amaroo Drive, Wellington, Dubbo Regional Council, New South Wales, Australia

History
- Built: 1912; 114 years ago

Site notes
- Architect: John Fowler & Co. (Leeds) Ltd
- Owner: Dubbo Regional Council

New South Wales Heritage Register
- Official name: John Fowler 7nhp Steam Road Locomotive
- Type: State heritage (movable / collection)
- Designated: 18 November 2011
- Reference no.: 1867
- Type: Other – Transport – Road
- Category: Transport – Land
- Builders: John Fowler & Co (Leeds) Ltd

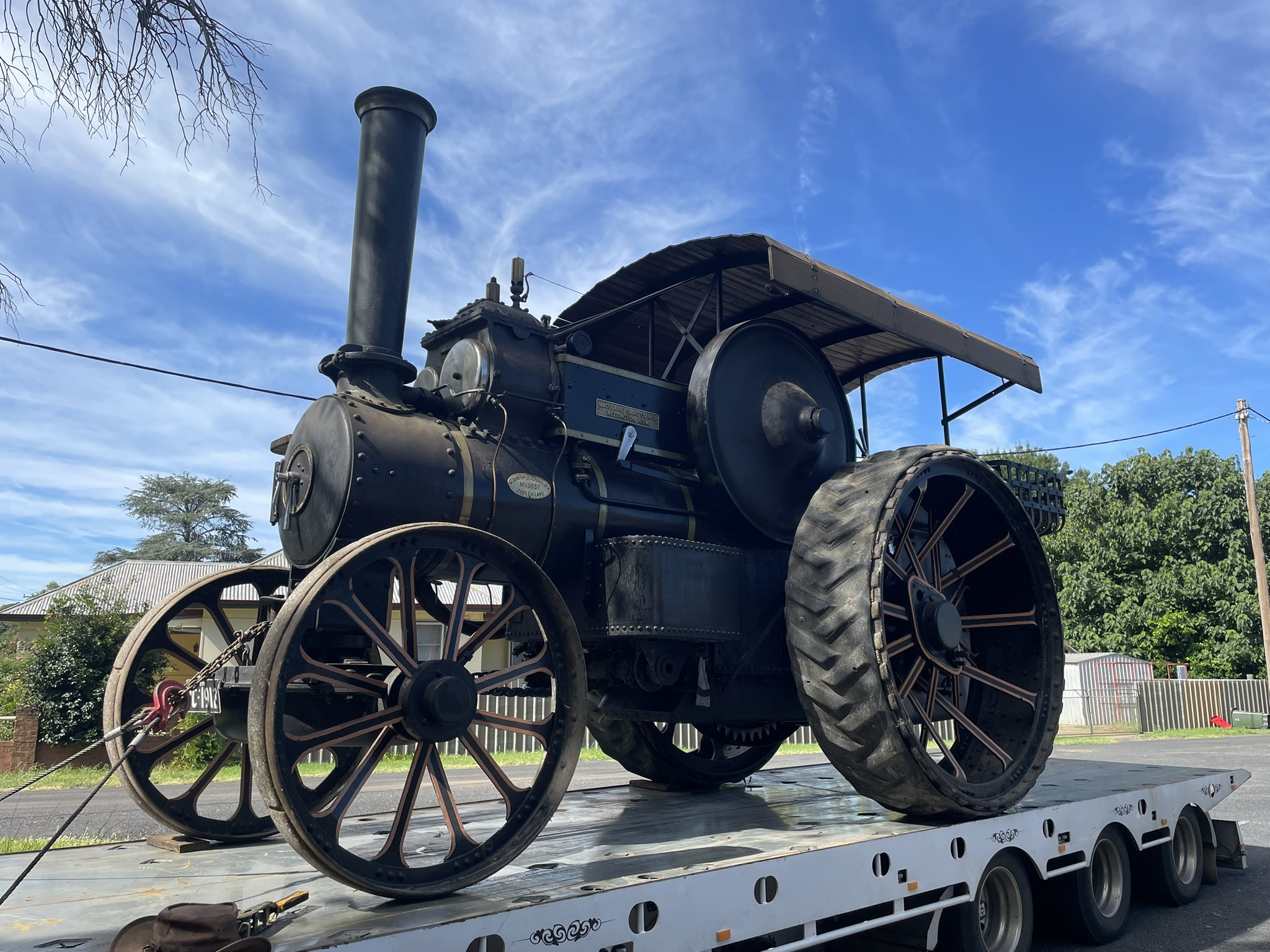

The John Fowler 7nhp Steam Road Locomotive is a heritage-listed former steam road locomotive with a nominal power of 5.2 kilowatts (7 hp) and is now exhibited at 9 Amaroo Drive, Wellington, in the Orana region of New South Wales, Australia. It was designed and built by John Fowler & Co. (Leeds) Ltd in 1912. The property is owned by the Dubbo Regional Council and it was added to the New South Wales State Heritage Register on 18 November 2011.

== History ==
On 4 February 1911 the Macquarie Shire Council, subsequently Wellington Shire Council and now Dubbo Regional Council, decided to call for tenders for the provision of a road plant. At the council meeting of 7 October 1911 Macquarie Shire Council accepted the tender of W. M. Noakes of Sydney for a steam traction road locomotive. The purchase of the engine was mentioned in the Council minutes of 4 May 1912. It was being constructed in England during 1912 before being shipped to Australia. On 1 June the decision was made to pay half the balance, with the other half to be paid in 1913.

Delivering the locomotive and gravel wagons to Wellington was difficult due to road conditions over the Great Dividing Range and made rail transport the only viable option for transporting such heavy machinery and plant. This meant the engine had to be dismantled and reassembled on delivery at Wellington. An engineer and a training officer arrived in Wellington on 3 June 1912 to help with the setup and early use of the locomotive. It is likely that this included the gravel wagons that arrived with the locomotive.

The Steam Road Locomotive would go on to play a major role in the early road development of the Wellington Area. Its arrival is believed to have been closely followed by a Government grant in November 1912 to be spent on upgrading shire roads from bullock and horse tracks, including: Wellington to Yullundry (A£4,982), Wellington to Orange via Stuart Town (A£2,046), Wellington towards Molong (A£1,100), Yeoval Road (A£1,753) and Arthurville Road (A£1,098). The funds for road improvements were welcomed in the Shire, especially for the crossing of the Catumbol Ranges. The locomotive is known to have worked on roads associated with these projects including the Arthurville, Yullundry and Finger Post roads to Curra Creek Bridge No 1 and Curra Creek Bridge No 2. It worked out of at least three quarry sites – Finger Post, 7 Mile Peg, Arthurville and 10 Mile Peg at Yullundry and possibly others. It was noted at the time that the engine and wagons could complete seven round trips from the quarries in one day, proving far cheaper than a contractor with a horse and dray.

The first driver employed by the Shire was Mr J. J. Fitzgerald of Orange. Other drivers included Bill Cameron and Jim Watson. During the period 1912–1922 the Fowler Steam Road locomotive was contracted by the Council to transport coal to the gas works and Water Pumping Station. In 1922 Council sold the locomotive to Jacob Offner of "Grace Hill" and "Spring Vale", Wellington. The Offners used the locomotive to assist with wheat threshing, chaff cutting, pumping water and land clearing until better machinery became available.

The locomotive was sold to a Mr McNamara from Molong in the 1950s. McNamara is believed to have made repairs to worn parts as required. In the 1980s it was purchased by Peter Strickland of Narromine.

In the 1990s the locomotive was offered for sale. There was concern that the locomotive may be purchased and moved overseas. This prompted Wellington Council to purchase it by public auction on 28 November 1994. This was followed by the formation of the Friends of the Fowler organisation to preserve the steam road locomotive. Today the John Fowler Steam Road locomotive is used for public display purposes. It is regularly used at festivals, including travelling as far afield as Canberra for the Centenary of Federation parade in 2001. Although restored, it is believed that all parts of it are original except for those which would have been replaced due to normal wear and tear.

Steam Road Locomotives (or traction engines) are the road equivalent of railway locomotive and were involved in creating infrastructure such as roads in rural towns, and agricultural/pastoral lands were developed. Such engines were instrumental in the opening up of districts as the establishment of towns, and the provision of roads would have been significantly restricted without them. They were primarily used for heavy haulage prior to the introduction of lorries. In particular, they were used by shire councils for road building, the Federal Capital Commission for the building of Canberra and haulage contractors. Steam Road Locomotives are considered to be the rarer of the different types of traction engines found in Australia.

The John Fowler Steam Road Locomotive is a form of traction engine that can be defined as mobile (wheeled) steam engine. Its purpose is to pull loads on roadways and served the same purpose as a railway locomotive, except that it did not run on tracks.

Traction engines originated in England in about 1860, with steam road engines constructed in the UK, USA, and to a lesser extent, Europe from 1860. For the next 60 years, several companies including John Fowler of Leeds, Charles Burrell of Thetford and Aveling & Porter of Rochester dominated the manufacture of traction engines. Other firms included J & H McLaren who were also located in Leeds and shared a common boundary with the premises of the John Fowler works. Leeds, together with Lincoln and the agricultural regions of East Anglia and Hampshire were the main locations for the manufacturing of traction engines. These engines were designed and built in many forms including general purpose traction engines, steam rollers, showman's engines, road locomotives, steam plough engines and light steam tractors.

By the 1890s road steam had almost completed its development and varied little until the last engines were built in the 1930s. Engines manufactured for Australia were modified to suit Australian conditions. Australian manufacturers of road engines did appear late in the development of the engine, but only a very small number of road steam engines were manufactured. The importation of American models from the early 1900 stimulated the English manufacturers to further modify their designs for Australian conditions.

General purpose traction engines had a nominal power of 3.7 to 6.0 kilowatts (5 to 8 hp) and usually had a single cylinder, although major manufacturers such as John Fowler also built a compound (or two-cylinder) version. To undertake the range of heavy work they were required for, the rear wheels of traction engines need to be driven through at least two gears and sometimes, for long distance haulage work where faster speeds are required, three gears. The general purpose traction engines were essentially an agricultural engine. Their main job was threshing, although in Australia they were commonly used for carting wool, wheat and timber, for land clearing, for direct ploughing, to drive chaff cutters and pumps and to operate machinery in sawmills. They were also used for haulage during road building.

Steam traction engines eventually gave way to tractors powered by internal combustion engines, initially developed during the First World War. A large surplus became available during the 1920s and as a result there was a marked decline in orders for traction engines in all their forms, most of which were still manufactured in England. By 1930, the general purpose traction engine era had come to an end. After the Great Depression of the early 1930s, a period of consolidation followed. Several companies ceased trading while others such as Clayton & Shuttleworth, Ruston & Hornsby and J & H McLaren diversified into other aspects of production.

=== Comparative analysis ===
The John Fowler Steam Road Locomotive is believed to be one of very few remaining intact, operating examples of a steam road locomotive in Australia. In 2009 research suggested that there were only 29 remaining. This was based on data up to 20 years old. Many steam engines, including steam road locomotives, were scrapped for their metal after World War II as the technology had been superseded. Of those that survived, a number have been exported. Of those that are left, very few are in public hands and even fewer are located in the localities they were purchased to work in. There may be no other John Fowler 7 nominal horse power Steam Road Locomotive in NSW.

A rarer nominal 7.5-kilowatt (10 hp) John Fowler Steam Road Locomotive is housed in the National Museum of Australia in Canberra. Another B6 John Fowler Steam Road locomotive is owned by Narromine Council. The engine at Wellington is believed to be an excellent example of the steam road locomotives used throughout Australia to transport heavy loads and to carry out heavy quarry and road construction work. Whilst this particular engine was located in the Wellington district, it is considered to represent a now rare class of engines engaged in this work in NSW.

== Description ==
The John Fowler 7 nominal horse power Steam Road Locomotive has the Serial No 13037. A steam traction engine, it is 3.56 metres (11.7 ft) high, 2.6 metres (8 ft 6 in) wide and 6.1 metres (20 ft) long. The locomotive weights 16.5 tonnes (18.2 short tons) in total. It is painted green with gold line work and a black stack with brass trimmings. The steam whistle, pressure gauge, pressure release valve and lubricator are polished brass. The oval brass nameplate on the exterior is on the left hand side showing the manufacturers name and serial number – John Fowler & Co Leeds Ltd No 13037 Leeds, England. On the front of the smoke box is a brass circular ring with the selling agents name around it – Selling Agent: W M Noakes of Sydney. The boiler lagging straps and the cylinder taps are also of polished brass. The brass fittings are believed to be original. The engine's canopy is of tin and lined in polished timber and is bolted to a steel frame on the chassis.

The fuel used for ignition is solid wood or coal. The engine is capable of filling its reservoirs from creek and rivers by using its steam injection lifter. It can raise 3,200 kilograms per metre (180 lb/in) of constant steam and has the power to haul 50 tonnes (55 short tons) with its spring mounted chassis and to winch road hauling wagons and water carts from bogs and over soft soil grounds.

=== Condition ===
As at 2 May 2011, the John Fowler Steam Road Locomotive was in excellent condition and will be subject to repairs during 2011 to ensure it continues to be operational.

The boiler, gears, fire box, smoke box and stack, chassis and wheels are all original.

=== Modifications and dates ===
28 November 1994 – the back steel wheels were fitted with rubber tyres to ensure that damage is minimal to bitumen roads. The original brass name plates with Macquarie Shire inscribed on them have been replaced.

2011 – conservation works to be undertaken with Heritage Branch grant funding

== Heritage listing ==
As at 23 May 2011, The John Fowler 7 nominal horse power Steam Road Locomotive has State significance as an example of a defunct and now rare technology that played a vital role in the construction of rural roads in NSW, thereby contributing to the increasing accessibility of regional areas in NSW across the late nineteenth and early twentieth century. The operational status and good physical integrity of the John Fowler Steam Road Locomotive provides a rare opportunity to demonstrate the power and scale of the machinery required for major rural road building activity in NSW.

John Fowler 7nhp Steam Road Locomotive was listed on the New South Wales State Heritage Register on 18 November 2011 having satisfied the following criteria.

The place is important in demonstrating the course, or pattern, of cultural or natural history in New South Wales.

The John Fowler Steam Road Locomotive at Wellington has State significance as it demonstrates the role of steam road locomotives in road building and haulage in the opening up of land for economic development across rural NSW in the early twentieth century. It has local historical significance for the Wellington area having been involved in constructing roads in the area between 1912 and 1922.

The place has a strong or special association with a person, or group of persons, of importance of cultural or natural history of New South Wales's history.

The John Fowler Steam Road Locomotive at Wellington has local associations with the Macquarie Shire Council, later part of Wellington Council. It also has associations with local property owners in the region whose ongoing use of the road locomotive ensured its preservation rather than sale for scrap metal.

The place is important in demonstrating aesthetic characteristics and/or a high degree of creative or technical achievement in New South Wales.

The John Fowler Steam Road Locomotive has state technical significance as a working example of a type of machinery once common across NSW and now capable of demonstrating to a certain degree the strength and speed of machinery used for road building in rural NSW in the nineteenth and twentieth century. It also presents an unusual opportunity to compare machinery purpose built in England for Australian conditions against standard versions of the type built for European conditions.

The place has a strong or special association with a particular community or cultural group in New South Wales for social, cultural or spiritual reasons.

The John Fowler Steam Road Locomotive has broad significance for an audience across NSW who has had, and will continue to have, an opportunity to interact with the road locomotive. Through such interaction this community has the opportunity to understand the technology and challenges. The John Fowler Steam Road Locomotive has local social significance for the Council and community members who have expended time and funding purchasing and ensuring the road locomotive's ongoing preservation. associated with rural road building in NSW.

The place possesses uncommon, rare or endangered aspects of the cultural or natural history of New South Wales.

The John Fowler Steam Road Locomotive at Wellington has state significance as a rare example of a John Fowler Steam Road Locomotive in NSW due to its size and type, and its operational capacity. This rarity value is increased by there being only a very limited number in public ownership, and the locomotive's presence within the locality in which it was originally located. The Locomotive is in good physical condition with only those elements subject to wear and tear having been replaced.

The place is important in demonstrating the principal characteristics of a class of cultural or natural places/environments in New South Wales.

The John Fowler Steam Road Locomotive at Wellington has State significance as an uncommon example of a now defunct technology and type of machinery widely used for road building in regional NSW in the late nineteenth century and early twentieth century.

== See also ==
- Traction engine
