= Talbragar Shire =

Former local government area in New South Wales, Australia

Talbragar Shire New South Wales
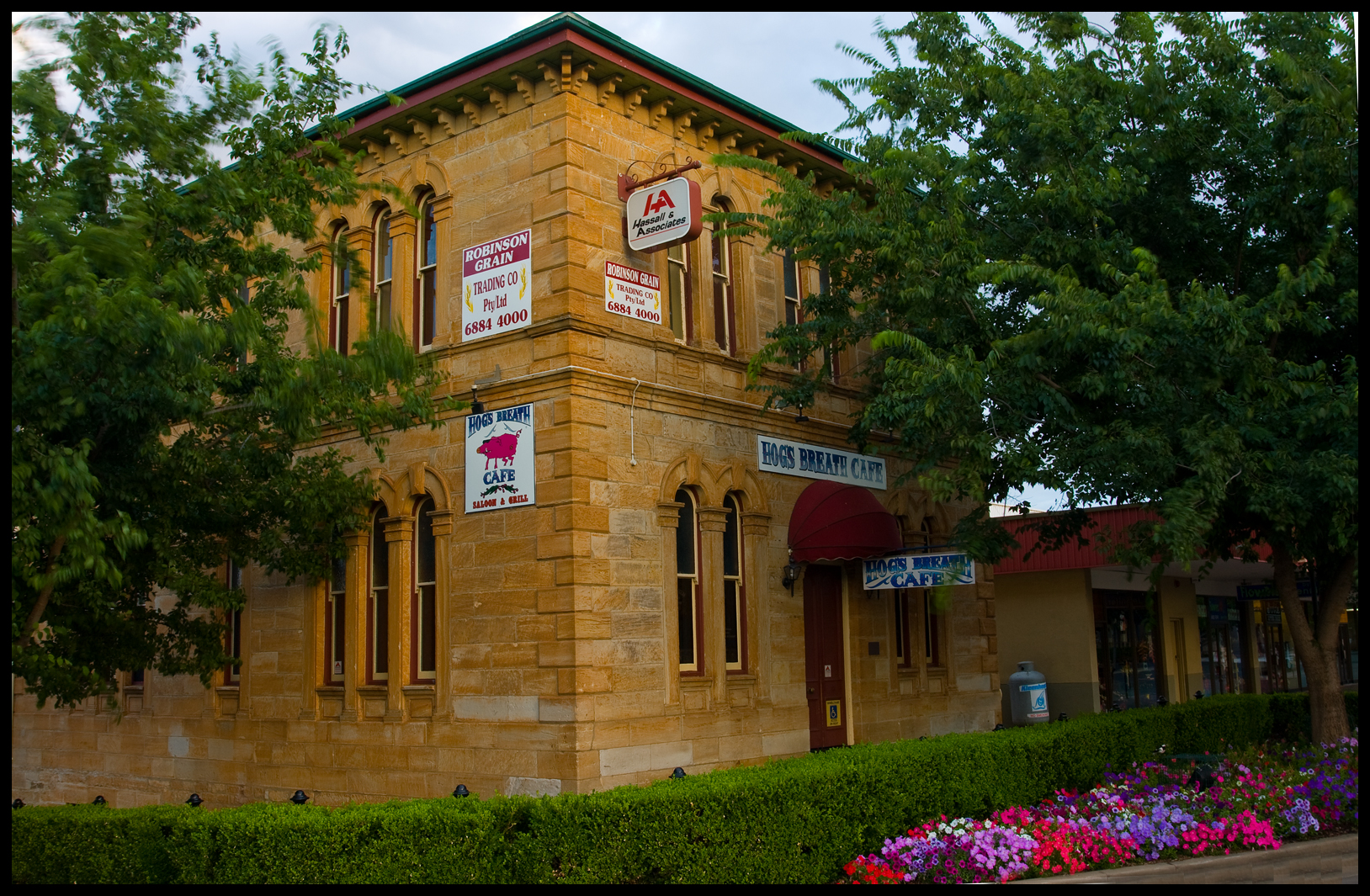
- Former Talbragar Shire Council Chambers, 2007)
- Established: 7 March 1906
- Abolished: 1 March 1980
- Council seat: Dubbo
- Region: Orana

Talbragar Shire was a local government area in the Orana region of New South Wales, Australia.

Talbragar Shire was proclaimed on 7 March 1906. The New South Wales State Heritage-listed Talbragar Shire Council Chambers are located in the city of Dubbo.

Talbragar Shire was absorbed into the City of Dubbo on 1 March 1980.
