= Old Dubbo Gaol =

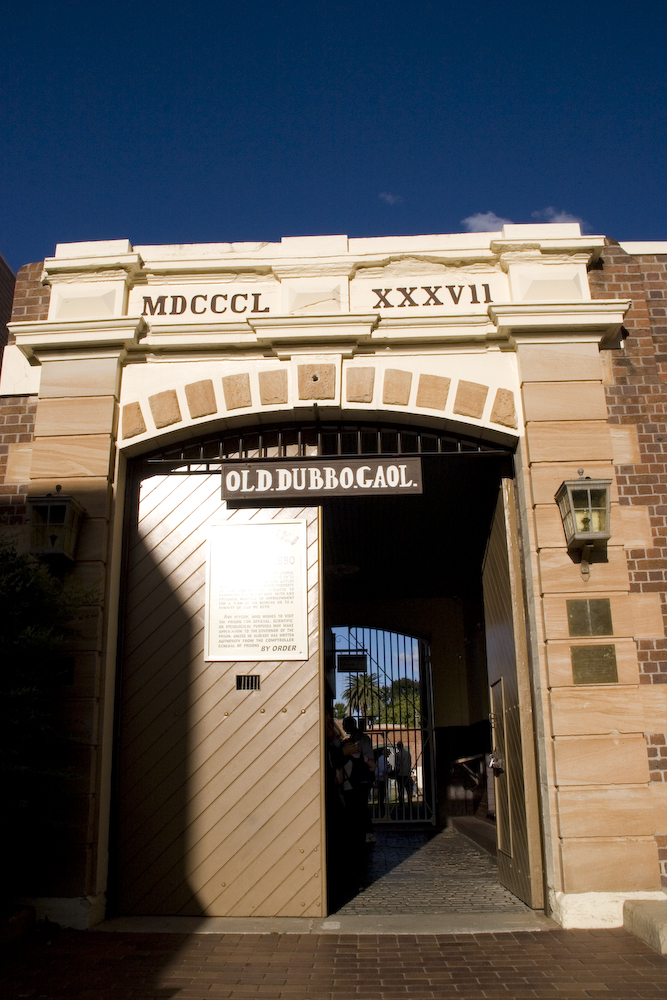
- Main entrance to the former gaol

- Location within New South Wales Location within Australia
- 32°14′45″S 148°36′09″E
- Location: 90 Macquarie Street, Dubbo, Dubbo Regional Council, New South Wales, Australia

History
- Built: 1847–1945
- Original use: Prison

Site notes
- Architect: Colonial Architect's Office
- Current use: Tourism attraction

New South Wales Heritage Register
- Official name: Old Dubbo Gaol; Dubbo Jail; Dubbo Gaol
- Type: State heritage (built)
- Designated: 26 March 2004
- Reference no.: 1689
- Type: Gaol/Lock-up
- Category: Law Enforcement
- Builders: James Atkinson Jnr (1862–63); William Bonython Moffatt (1871, 1874)

The Old Dubbo Gaol is a heritage-listed former gaol and now museum and tourist attraction at 90 Macquarie Street, Dubbo, in the Dubbo Region local government area of New South Wales, Australia. The gaol was designed by the NSW Colonial Architect's Office and was built from 1847 to 1945 by James Atkinson Jnr (1862–63) and William Bonython Moffatt (1871 and 1874). The gaol was added to the New South Wales State Heritage Register on 26 March 2004. It was the second gaol in Dubbo, replacing lock-ups built in 1847 and 1862.

When closed, the Government of New South Wales planned its demolition and replacement with a multi-storey office block. Protests led by the then Dubbo City Council and a local historical society led to the plans being dropped. In 1973 the building was transferred from the NSW Department for Corrections to the city council, with the intention of restoration and creation of a tourist attraction.

== History ==
The Dubbo Gaol was erected on the site of the original courthouse. It is believed to have been officially opened in 1887. Many of the buildings however were already in existence by this time. Many changes and new buildings followed. The surrounding wall also changed shape. Closed as a gaol in 1966, the complex re-opened as a tourist attraction in 1974.

In 2015 Old Dubbo Jail won a silver prize in the cultural tourism category of the 12th Travel Inland Tourism Awards. The Gaol was inducted into the Tourism Hall of Fame. In August 2016 the gaol was closed to allow extensive restoration and renovation of the site.

== Description ==
The Old Dubbo Gaol is a small, compact gaol located within the central business district of Dubbo. The enclosing wall is extensive and high. It is built of Dubbo red-brown bricks in English bond, with piers, laid in lime mortar. Above the north-eastern corner of the wall is a watchtower having a wide eaved roof of corrugated iron. Originally a catwalk extended from the watchtower. The structure inside the gaol wall include the main male cell block with 12 ordinary cells and specialised cells comprising two solitary confinement cells, a padded cell, a condemned cell; the female cell block comprising two cells, a bathroom and exercise yard; the infirmary and kitchen block, including a kitchen, infirmary, Library, bathroom, two store rooms, two offices; two remand yards adjacent to a debtors exercise yard and an early toilet block, laundry building with toilets and fenced exercise yards, sanitary disposal facility, toilet. The buildings are mainly sandstone with hipped corrugated iron roofs, while the entrance, watchtower and women's cell block are of brick. The infirmary and kitchen and the male exercise yard feature simple wooden brackets to the verandah posts. The gallows were re-erected.

=== Condition ===
As of 8 December 2010, the physical condition of the buildings is good, however, rising damp is a problem in some areas. Fences are suffering from dry rot. The re-erected gallows are in poor, deteriorating condition. The first two public buildings in Dubbo – a police residence and court house/lockup were built in this precinct. There were two prisons and two court houses built within the precinct prior to the construction of the present buildings. Archaeological potential would be expected to be medium to high in a number of areas.

Some features lost but reasonably authentic restoration overall. Built over a number of different periods always changing. More sympathetic signs suggested.

=== Modifications and dates ===
Modifications since initial construction are:

- 1847–48: First police residence and courthouse/lockup built
- 1862–63: New court house and watch house built, designed by Colonial Architects office.
- 1869–70: Additions to back of court house.
- 1871: New stone watch house or lock up built - beginning of Dubbo Gaol.
- 1873–74 Additions: extension to cell block with 5 cells, fenced enclosure around the east end of cell block,
- 1877–80: major extensions – hospital and kitchen block, perimeter wall and two watchtowers, shelter sheds.
- 1886–87: major alterations and additions including construction of residences (gaoler's), re-located entrance, women's cells & bathroom, new gateway/entrance
- 1895–98: extension of gaol wall, removal of one watchtower, new trial yard, shelter sheds, new office and guard room etc.
- 1928–29: extensive renovations and additions, including new gaolers residence
- 1934: sewerage connected and modifications to bathrooms etc.
- 1945: two trial yards extended

== Heritage listing ==
As at 24 July 2003, Old Dubbo Gaol is of State, regional and Local significance and is listed on the now defunct Register of the National Estate. The presence of the gaol is a significant reminder of the unusual origins of the City of Dubbo as a regional centre for the judiciary before it became a location of commerce and habitation. Although no longer a working gaol, it served the area both as a Police and minor Gaol in the 95 years of operation as part of the facilities for the administration of justice across the region. It is a survivor of the "Hay" type of gaol typical of the New South Wales justice system. Most of these have now disappeared or are very much altered. It is associated with a James Barnet Court House within the precinct.

Old Dubbo Gaol also has social significance as a major tourist attraction in the city and is also seen as an underutilised civic amenity. It is of social significance for the fact that it was saved from demolition by State government actions by a group of local citizens in 1974. The survival of the gaol is due to their enthusiasm and energy. Its social significance is also extended to surviving inmates and their relatives and descendants, both of European and Aboriginal extract. The Old Dubbo Gaol has aesthetic significance as a group of well proportioned and well constructed buildings surrounded by grass lawns set within a brick walled compound. It is an oasis of peace and calm in the middle of a bustling modern city.

Old Dubbo Gaol was listed on the New South Wales State Heritage Register on 26 March 2004, having satisfied the following criteria.

The place is important in demonstrating the course, or pattern, of cultural or natural history in New South Wales.

Old Dubbo Gaol is one of many country gaols erected in the 19th century to cope with the burgeoning population as it spread west and opened up the interior of New South Wales. By 1900 there were many prisons and lockups across the state. As such then, Old Dubbo Gaol is not important in the course, or pattern of NSW's cultural or natural history. However, it is of exceptional significance locally. The buildings erected for the purpose of the administration of justice for Dubbo and the surrounding region were the first to appear in the new settlement. The Gaol therefore traces its lineage to the beginning of the city. Aboriginal association with the gaol, in terms of intercultural relations on the frontier of white settlement is exceptionally high.

The place has a strong or special association with a person, or group of persons, of importance of cultural or natural history of New South Wales's history.

Dubbo Gaol was never more than a local and regional gaol. The staff, inmates and other visitors were similar to other gaols and judicial institutions of this type across the state. The Gaol has associations with some infamous criminals, in particular, Jackie Underwood who was hanged in the Gaol in 1901 for his part in the Breelong Incident near Gilgandra. The Gaol is also associated with the Dubbo Court House, a remarkable James Barnet Court House designed c.1887. While working as the Clerk of the Court in Dubbo, Rolf Boldrewood penned the Australian classic novel, Robbery under Arms.

The place is important in demonstrating aesthetic characteristics and/or a high degree of creative or technical achievement in New South Wales.

Old Dubbo Gaol sits within a high gaol wall in the main street of Dubbo. While the gaol itself does not have any extraordinary aesthetic appeal, the location of the buildings within the busy Dubbo CBD, provides an oasis within the Dubbo CBD. Its proximity to the Dubbo Court House and gardens adds to this setting.

The place has a strong or special association with a particular community or cultural group in New South Wales for social, cultural or spiritual reasons.

Old Dubbo Gaol does not have strong or special association with a particular community or cultural group in NSW (or the local; area) for social, cultural or spiritual reasons. It does however, have association with the "under-classes", in particular, rural poor, itinerant rural workers, hawkers and "swaggies". The Gaol did incarcerate a surprisingly large number of prisoners from culturally diverse backgrounds, particularly the Chinese. Of the eight men hanged in the Gaol, two were Aboriginal, two were Chinese and one was a Dane.

The place has potential to yield information that will contribute to an understanding of the cultural or natural history of New South Wales.

The history of the Gaol is now well researched and it is unlikely that any significant new material will emerge from the place. Archaeological excavations may reveal some interesting information or remains but nothing that could be gleaned from other sites. A very large number of Aboriginal people from the region were incarcerated in the Gaol during the process of dispossession, and future research may reveal some interesting episodes in the history of inter-cultural relations in a "frontier" location.

The place possesses uncommon, rare or endangered aspects of the cultural or natural history of New South Wales.

Old Dubbo Gaol is rare in its completeness. It is possibly the most complete country gaol listed on the register of the National Estate for New South Wales. Most of the other country gaols have been removed, demolished, or altered so significantly that it is difficult to interpret their origins and functions. In this respect Old Dubbo Gaol has high significance for the State and for the region beyond the Blue Mountains. The free standing, demountable scaffold, is probably unique in Australia and therefore highly significant to the study of capital punishment in Australia.

The place is important in demonstrating the principal characteristics of a class of cultural or natural places/environments in New South Wales.

Old Dubbo Gaol is important in demonstrating the principal characteristics of a class of NSW's cultural; or natural places in that it closely follows the "Hay" style of country gaol as identified by J. S. Kerr. In this it is judged as being of HIGH significance. It would gain a higher rating if the Gaoler's Cottage was still standing. As both the early and the later cottages have been demolished the gaol is not complete. However, in its current state of preservation it is a remarkably intact survivor of its type.

== See also ==
- Punishment in Australia
