= Wellington Shire =

Wellington Shire could refer to either of two local government areas in Australia:

- Shire of Wellington in Victoria
- Wellington Council in New South Wales
