= Dubbo Regional Council =

- Local government area
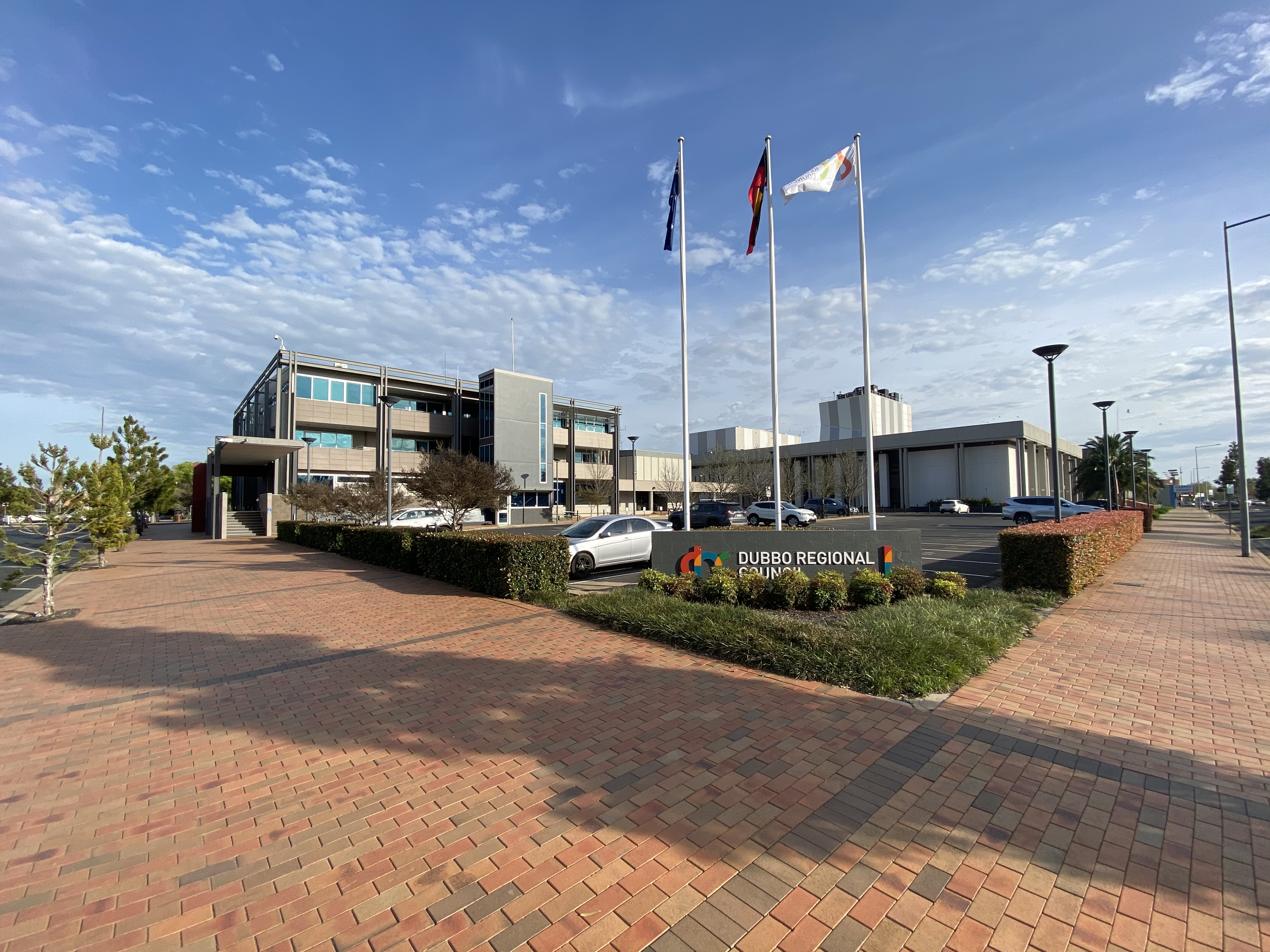
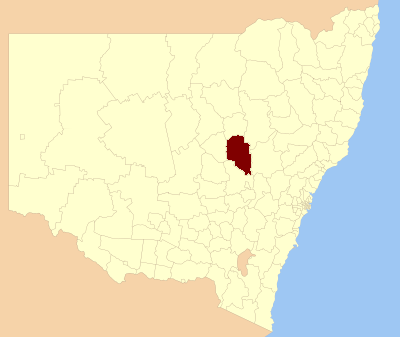
- Civic Administration Building located on Church Street Location in New South Wales

- Interactive map of Dubbo Regional Council
- Coordinates: 32°15′S 148°36′E
- Country: Australia
- State: New South Wales
- Region: Central West; Orana
- Established: 12 May 2016
- Council seat: Dubbo

Government
  - Mayor: Josh Black
  - State electorate: Dubbo
  - Federal divisions: Parkes; Calare

Area
  - Total: 7,536 km^{2} (2,910 sq mi)

Population
  - Total: 54,922 (2021 census)
  - Density: 7.2880/km^{2} (18.8757/sq mi)
- Website: Dubbo Regional Council
LGAs around Dubbo Regional Council
	Gilgandra	Warrumbungle
Narromine	Dubbo Regional Council	Mid-Western
	Cabonne

The Dubbo Regional Council is a local government area located in the Central West and Orana regions of New South Wales, Australia. The council was formed on 12 May 2016 through a merger of the City of Dubbo and Wellington Council as part of a widespread council amalgamation program. It was initially named Western Plains Regional Council for almost four months, and its name was changed to Dubbo Regional Council on 7 September 2016.

The council comprises an area of 7,536 square kilometres (2,910 sq mi) and occupies part of the central western plains of New South Wales, surrounding the regional centre of Dubbo. As at the 2016 census, the council had an estimated population of 50,077.

The local government area used to contain the locality of North Yeoval, but the locality was transferred to Cabonne Council on 1 July 2026.

The current mayor of Dubbo Regional Council is Councillor Josh Black.

== Towns and localities ==
As well as the regional centre of Dubbo, the following towns and localities are located within Dubbo Regional Council:

- Brocklehurst
- Dripstone
- Euchareena
- Eulomogo
- Eumungerie
- Geurie
- Maryvale
- Mogriguy
- Mumbil
- North Yeoval
- Rawsonville
- Stuart Town
- Toongi
- Wellington
- Wongarbon

== Heritage listings ==
Dubbo Regional Council area has a number of heritage-listed sites, including:

Dubbo

- Cobra Street: Dubbo RAAF Stores Depot
- Macquarie Street: Talbragar Shire Council Chambers
- 110-114 Macquarie Street: National Australia Bank building, Dubbo
- 118 Macquarie Street: Colonial Mutual Life building, Dubbo
- 195-197 Macquarie Street: Milestone Hotel
- 215 Macquarie Street: Old Dubbo Gaol
- Main Western railway: Dubbo railway station
- Main Western railway: Dubbo rail bridge over Macquarie River
- Obley Road: Dundullimal Homestead

Euchareena

- 2531 Euchareena Road: Nubrygyn Inn and Cemetery

Stuart Town

- Main Western railway: Stuart Town railway station

Wellington

- 9 Amaroo Drive: John Fowler 7nhp Steam Road Locomotive
- Curtis Street: Wellington Convict and Mission Site
- 21 Maughan Street: Wellington Post Office
- University Road: Blacks Camp

== Demographics ==
The population for the predecessor councils was estimated in 2015 as:

- 41,934 in City of Dubbo
- 9,073 in Wellington Council

Selected historical census data for Dubbo Regional Council local government area
Census year		2016	2021
Population	Estimated residents on census night	50,077	▲54,922
Population	LGA rank in terms of size within New South Wales	46th	
Population	% of New South Wales population	0.66%	▲0.68%
Population	% of Australian population	0.21%	0.21%
Cultural and language diversity			
Ancestry, top responses	English	28.8%	▲35.9%
Ancestry, top responses	Australian	35.5%	▲40.1%
Ancestry, top responses	Irish	9.2%	▲10.6%
Ancestry, top responses	Scottish	6.7%	▲8.2%
Ancestry, top responses	Australian Aboriginal	–	15.1%
Language, top responses (other than English)	Nepali	0.4%	▲1.4%
Language, top responses (other than English)	Mandarin	0.3%	0.3%
Language, top responses (other than English)	Malayalam	0.2%	▲0.4%
Language, top responses (other than English)	Tagalog	0.2%	–
Language, top responses (other than English)	Sinhalese	0.2%	–
Religious affiliation			
Religious affiliation, top responses	Catholic	29.0%	▼25.3%
Religious affiliation, top responses	No religion, so described	17.7%	▲27.0%
Religious affiliation, top responses	Anglican	23.5%	▼18.2%
Religious affiliation, top responses	Uniting Church	5.2%	▼3.8%
Religious affiliation, top responses	Median weekly incomes		
Personal income	Median weekly personal income	A$660	A$837
Personal income	% of Australian median income	99.6%	▲103.9%
Family income	Median weekly family income	A$1,525	▲ A$1,969
Family income	% of Australian median income	87.9%	▲92.8%
Household income	Median weekly household income	A$1,272	▲ A$1,597
Household income	% of Australian median income	88.4%	▲91.4%

== Council ==
=== Current composition and election method ===
The Dubbo Regional Council is composed of ten councillors elected proportionally. The council was divided into five wards, each electing two councillors until a referendum held alongside the 2021 local government elections abolished the ward system. The undivided system came into effect at the 2024 local government elections. All councillors are elected for a fixed four-year term of office. The mayor is elected by the councillors at the first meeting of the council. The current makeup of the council is as follows:

The most recent election was held on 14 September 2024 and the makeup of the council is as follows:

Councillor	Party	Notes
Josh Black	Labor	Mayor
Kate Richardson	Shooters, Fishers, Farmers	
Mathew Dickerson	Independent	
Pamella Wells	Labor	
Jennifer Cowley	Independent	
Matt Wright	Independent	
Shibli Chowdhury	Independent National	
Phillip Toynton	Shooters, Fishers, Farmers	Deputy Mayor
Richard Ivey	Independent	
Adam Ryab	Labor	

== Election results ==
=== 2024 ===
2024 New South Wales local elections: Dubbo
Party	Candidate	Votes	%	±%
Labor	1. Josh Black (elected 1); 2. Pamella Wells (elected 4); 3. Adam Ryab (elected 10); 4. Roy Elder; 5. Jodie Benton; 6. Kirsty Hayden; 7. Greg Hough	6,464	22.5	−1
Shooters, Fishers, Farmers	1. Kate Richardson (elected 2); 2. Phillip Toynton (elected 8); 3. John Richardson; 4. Jeremy Birchall; 5. Michael Adams; 6. Sarah Hollier	4,621	16.1	
Independent	Mathew Dickerson (elected 3)	3,772	13.2	
Independent	Jennifer Cowley (elected 5)	2,039	7.1	
Independent	1. Pete Rothwell; 2. Matt Rendall; 3. Manti Morse; 4. Jai Silkman; 5. Megan Adler; 6. Ricky Jackson	1,679	5.9	
Independent	1. Lukas Butler (elected 11); 2. Rebecca Pearson; 3. David King; 4. Rachelle Jane; 5. Robert Osborne; 6. Angela Brooke	1,650	5.8	
Independent	Matt Wright (elected 6)	1,625	5.7	
Independent National	Shibli Chowdhury (elected 7)	1,293	4.5	
Greens	1. Mike Augee; 2. Matt Parmeter; 3. Ruby Davies; 4. Pat Emblen; 5. Steve Houston; 6. Peter Duggan	1,170	4.1	
Independent	Richard Ivey (elected 9)	892	3.1	
Independent	Peter Gibbs	758	2.6	
Independent	1. Kellie Jennar; 2. Sharon Quill; 3. Jude Morrell; 4. Marcello Davis; 5. Bron Powell; 6. Di Clifford	741	2.6	
Independent	Rod Fardell	735	2.6	
Independent	Jess Gough	542	1.9	
Independent	Sophia Johnson	309	1.1	
Independent	Mary Kovac	224	0.8	
Independent National	Trevor Jones	172	0.6	
Total formal votes		28,686	91.0	
Informal votes		2,845	9.0	
Turnout		31,531	83.2	

=== 2021 ===
2021 New South Wales local elections: Dubbo
Party	Votes	%	Swing	Seats	Change
Independent	12,711	43.5		5	
Labor	6,871	23.5		3	
Ben Shields Team	5,687	19.4		1	Steady
Independent National	3,973	13.6		1	
Formal votes	29,242				

== See also ==
- Local government areas of New South Wales
