= Talbragar Shire Council Chambers =

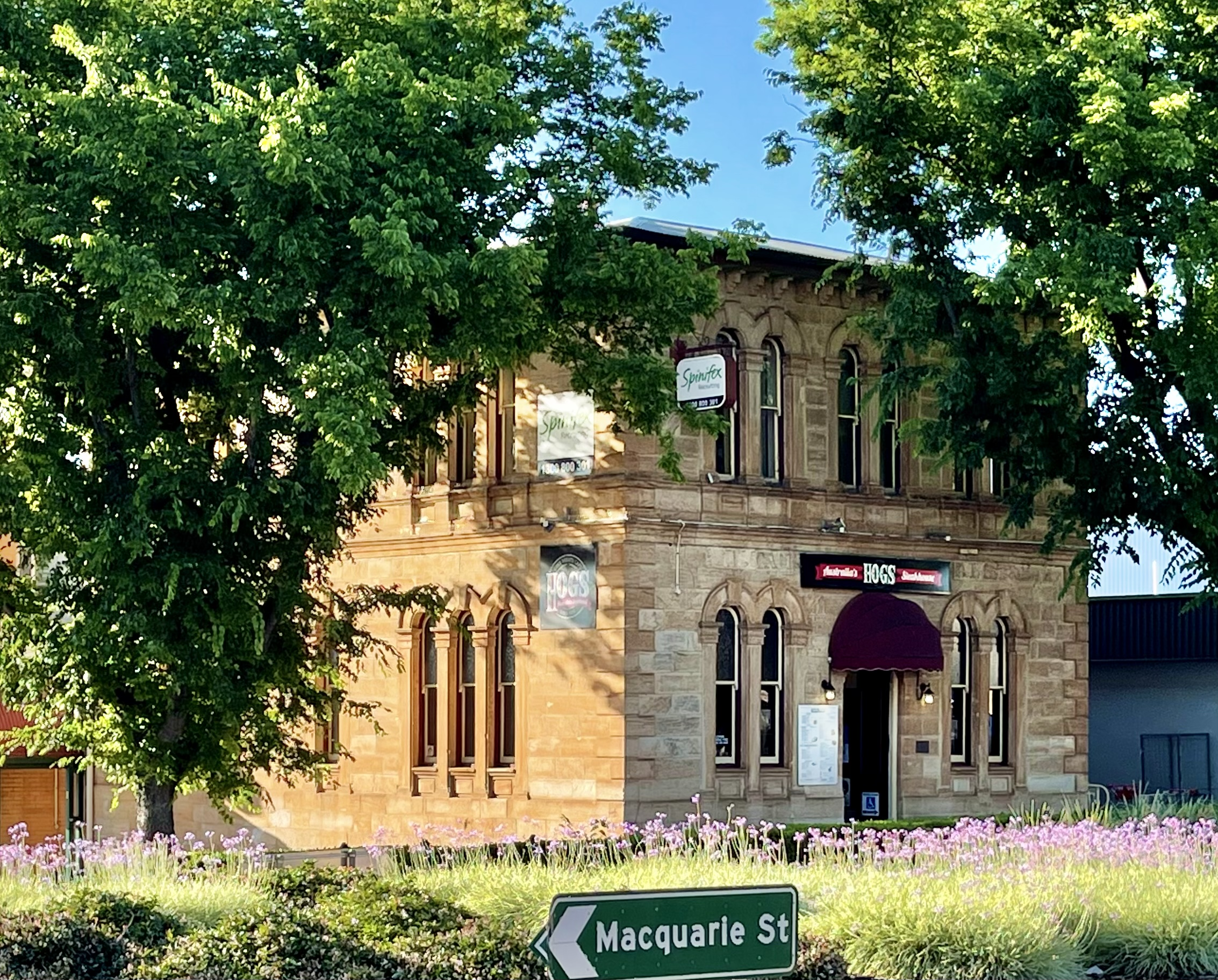
- Former Talbragar Shire Council Chambers (Hog's Breath Cafe, 2021)

- Location within New South Wales Location within Australia
- 32°15′03″S 148°36′01″E
- Location: Macquarie Street, Dubbo, Dubbo Regional Council, New South Wales, Australia

Site notes
- Architect: Architect Hilley
- Owner: Dubbo City Council

New South Wales Heritage Register
- Official name: Talbragar Shire Council Chambers; CBC Bank; Commercial Banking Company
- Type: State heritage (built)
- Designated: 2 April 1999
- Reference no.: 219
- Type: Bank
- Category: Commercial

The Talbragar Shire Council Chambers is a heritage-listed former council chambers and former bank building located in Macquarie Street, Dubbo, in the Dubbo Regional Council local government area of New South Wales, Australia. The building was designed by Architect Hilley. It is also known as CBC Bank and Commercial Banking Company. The property is owned by Dubbo Regional Council and was added to the New South Wales State Heritage Register on 2 April 1999.

== History ==
The building was originally the premises of the first bank in Dubbo, erected by the Commercial Banking Company of Sydney. The building was constructed in 1867 to the design of the Architect Hilley. For many years it was the town's finest building and the only bank until 1876. When the bank moved further north the building became the offices of Talbragar Shire Council, established in 1907.

In December 1979 the Dubbo Council and Dubbo Museum and Historical Society advised the Heritage Council that the Talbragar Shire building was under threat of demolition and requested protection under the Heritage Act, 1977. Following amalgamation of Dubbo and Talbragar the future of the building was uncertain. To provide security to the building an Interim Conservation Order was placed over the building on 2 May 1980.

In recognition as an important item of the State environmental heritage and to ensure the protection of the building a Permanent Conservation Order was placed over the building on 23 July 1982.

It was transferred to the State Heritage Register on 2 April 1999.

== Description ==
Styled in a restrained Victorian Italianate manner, the dressed sandstone facades of the building are almost severe, lightened only by round-headed window openings arranged in pairs on the Macquarie Street facade and in triad on the Bultje Street facade, string courses at first floor level and rusticated quoins. The iron roof is obscured by the substantial projecting cornice.

The building is two storeys and has an extensive cellar. Much of the original interior is intact; lath and plaster walls and ceilings.

=== Modifications and dates ===
It appears that the building may have been sandblasted for cleaning with subsequent erosion damage. Repointing with cement mortar also.

- 1984 – Heritage Council approval granted minor alterations to convert ground floor into a restaurant and upper floor into two offices.
- 1989 – Heritage Council approval for demolition of rear and erection of new addition.
- 1989 – Heritage Council approval for signage, and exterior colour scheme.
- 1990 – Heritage Council approval for internal fitout for offices.

== Heritage listing ==
As at 3 October 2000, constructed of sandstone to the designs of the architect Hilley in 1867, the building represented a substantial vote of confidence in the future of Dubbo by the Commercial Banking Company of Sydney Limited, the first Bank to open for business in Dubbo and the first to construct major premises in the town. The building makes an important contribution to the streetscape of Macquarie Street and is complemented by the Old Imperial Hotel building.

Talbragar Shire Council Chambers was listed on the New South Wales State Heritage Register on 2 April 1999 having satisfied the following criteria.

The place is important in demonstrating the course, or pattern, of cultural or natural history in New South Wales.

Constructed of sandstone to the designs of the architect Hilley in 1867, the building represented a substantial vote of confidence in the future of Dubbo by the Commercial Banking Company of Sydney Limited, the first Bank to open for business in Dubbo and the first to construct major premises in the town.

The place is important in demonstrating aesthetic characteristics and/or a high degree of creative or technical achievement in New South Wales.

The building makes an important contribution to the streetscape of Macquarie Street and is complemented by the Old Imperial Hotel building.

== See also ==
- Australian non-residential architectural styles
