= James Samuels =

James Samuels may refer to:

- J-Mee Samuels, American sprinter
- James Samuels (politician), immigrant to Dubbo, New South Wales
