= National Australia Bank building, Dubbo =

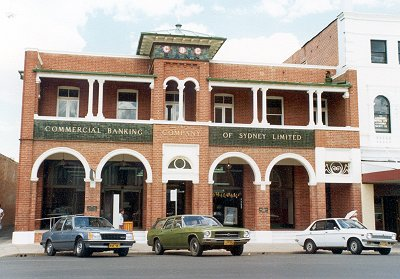
- National Australia Bank building (still bearing signage for the CBC Bank)

- Location within New South Wales Location within Australia
- 32°14′48″S 148°36′07″E
- Location: 110–114 Macquarie Street, Dubbo, Dubbo Regional Council, New South Wales, Australia

Site notes
- Architect(s): Laurie and Heath
- Owner: Privately owned

New South Wales Heritage Register
- Official name: CBC Bank; National Australia Bank
- Type: State heritage (built)
- Designated: 2 April 1999
- Reference no.: 39
- Type: Bank
- Category: Commercial

The National Australia Bank building is a heritage-listed former bank building located at 110–114 Macquarie Street, Dubbo, Dubbo Regional Council, New South Wales, Australia. It was designed by Laurie and Heath. It is also known as the National Australia Bank or the CBC Bank building. The property is privately owned and was added to the New South Wales State Heritage Register on 2 April 1999.

== History ==
The National Australia Bank building was designed and constructed c. 1906 to 1907 by Laurie and Heath for the Commercial Banking Company of Sydney Ltd.

In 1979 the Heritage Council received from Dubbo City Council a request for advice concerning the proposed demolition for redevelopment of the CBC Bank. Following an inspection by the Heritage Office and discussions with the owner an Interim Conservation Order was placed on 25 May 1979. Following the placement of the Interim Conservation Order, the management of the CBC Bank, with advice from the Heritage Office, undertook to renovate, repair and adapt the premises. The work carried out reinforced the buildings important civic contribution to Dubbo.

A Permanent Conservation Order was placed over the property on 4 September 1981. It was transferred to the State Heritage Register on 2 April 1999.

== Description ==
The CBC Bank is constructed in the Edwardian style. Its facade consists of a low, central pyramid roofed turret flanked by arcaded and verandahed wings either side.

=== Modifications and dates ===
In 1980 internal modifications and two palm trees were removed.

== Heritage listing ==
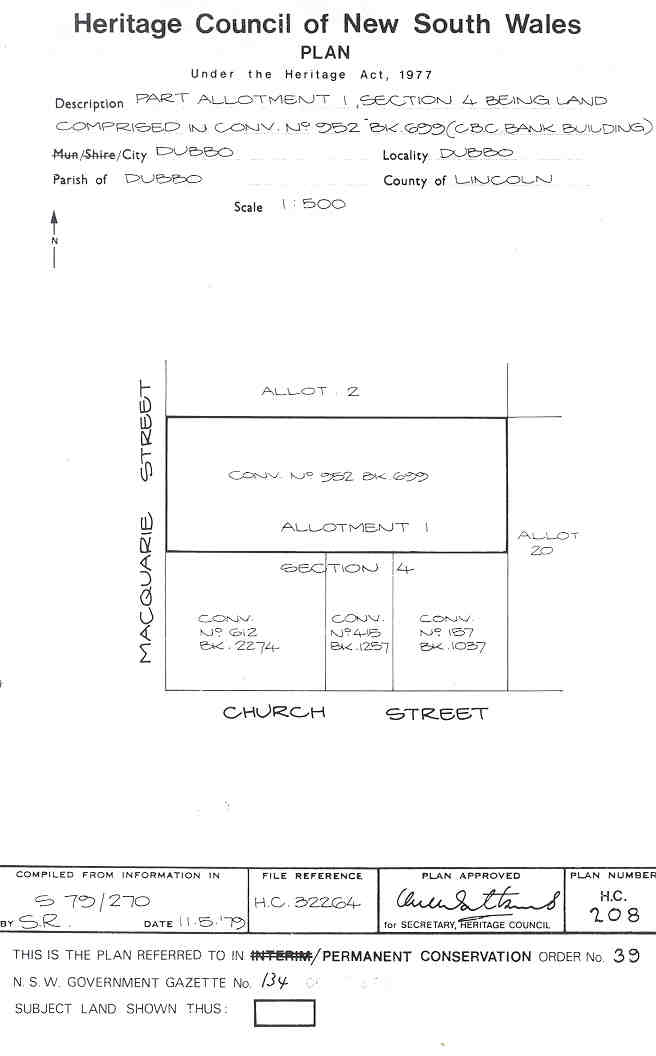
Heritage boundaries

As at 30 April 2001, the National Australia Bank building was designed and built about 1906 to 1907 by Laurie and Heath and is a fine Edwardian bank with a commanding arcaded elevation to Macquarie Street, incorporating a central turret. It is an important component of Dubbo's townscape.

The building was listed on the New South Wales State Heritage Register on 2 April 1999 having satisfied the following criteria.

The place is important in demonstrating the course, or pattern, of cultural or natural history in New South Wales.

The bank building was designed and built from 1906 to 1907 by Laurie and Heath.

The place is important in demonstrating aesthetic characteristics and/or a high degree of creative or technical achievement in New South Wales.

The bank building is a fine Edwardian bank with a commanding arcaded elevation to Macquarie Street, incorporating a central turret. It is an important component of Dubbo's townscape.

== See also ==
- Australian non-residential architectural styles
