= Eumungerie =

Eumungerie New South Wales
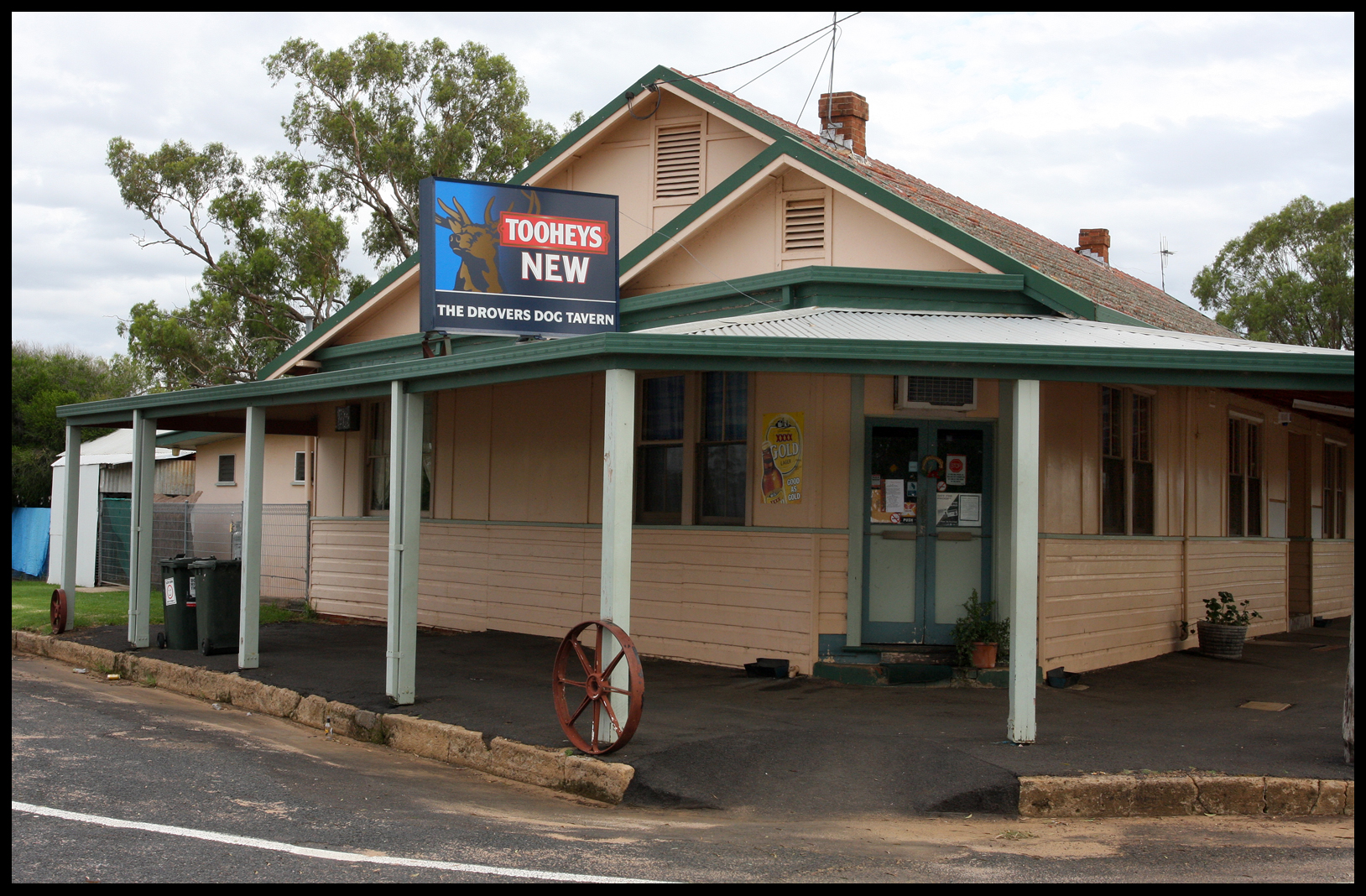
- Drovers Dog Hotel, 2007

- Coordinates: 31°56′54″S 148°37′13″E
- Population: 384 (SAL 2021)
- Postcode(s): 2822
- Location: 423 km (263 mi) NW of Sydney; 37 km (23 mi) N of Dubbo; 31 km (19 mi) S of Gilgandra
- LGA(s): Dubbo Regional Council
- State electorate(s): Dubbo
- Federal division(s): Parkes

Eumungerie is a town in central west New South Wales, Australia. The town is in the Dubbo Regional Council local government area and adjacent to the Newell Highway, 423 kilometres (263 mi) north west of the state capital Sydney and 37 kilometres (23 mi) north of the regional centre of Dubbo.
