= Colonial Mutual Life building, Dubbo =

Colonial Mutual Life Building
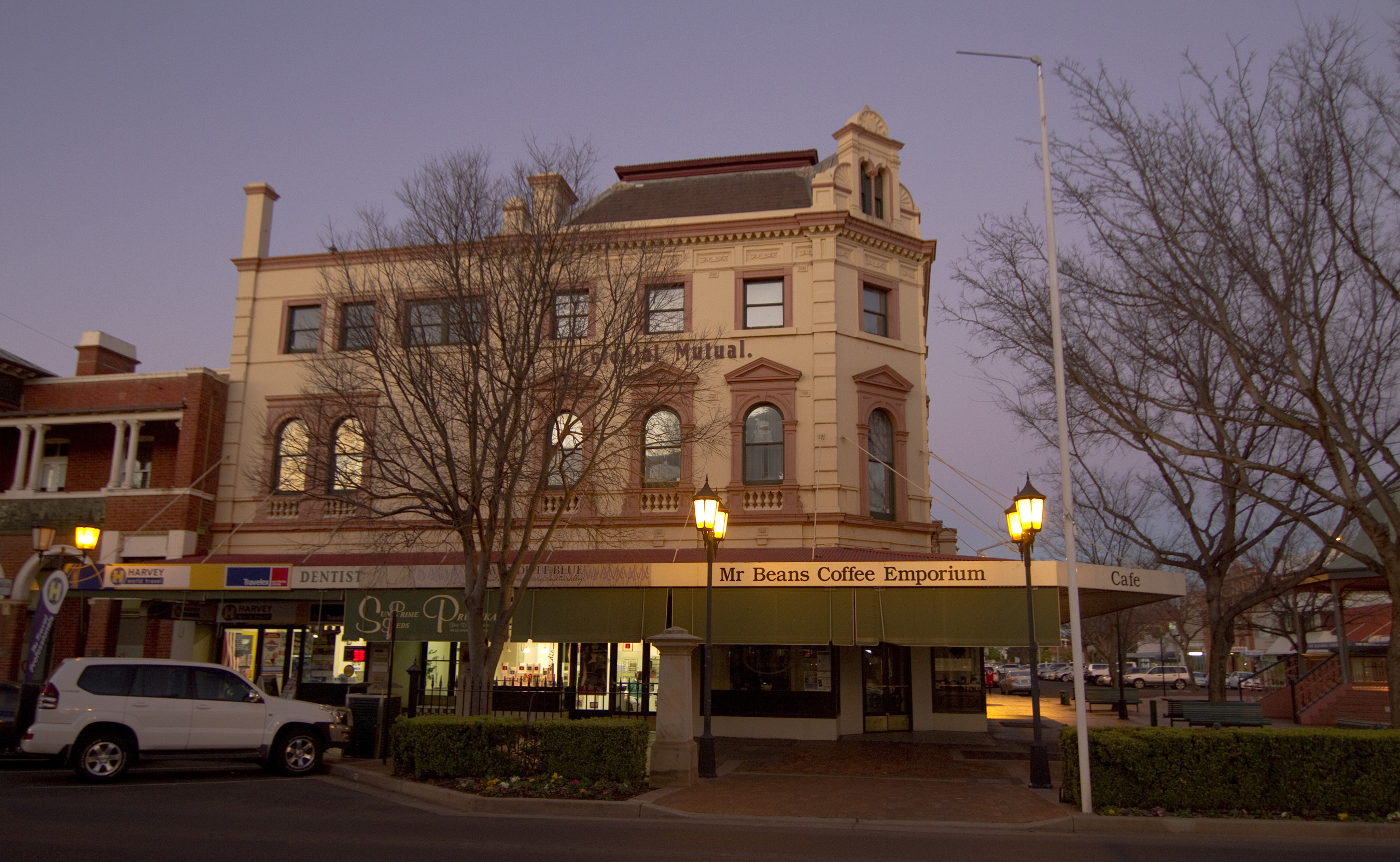
- The former Colonial Mutual Life Building, pictured in 2013

- Location within New South Wales Location within Australia
- 32°14′48″S 148°36′06″E
- Location: 118 Macquarie Street, Dubbo, Dubbo Regional Council, New South Wales, Australia

History
- Built: 1885
- Built for: Australian Joint Stock Bank

Site notes
- Owner: Privately owned

New South Wales Heritage Register
- Official name: CML Building; Colonial Mutual Life Building; 116–120 Macquarie Street
- Type: State heritage (built)
- Designated: 2 April 1999
- Reference no.: 180
- Type: Life insurance company office
- Category: Commercial

The Colonial Mutual Life Building is a heritage-listed former life insurance office located at 118 Macquarie Street, Dubbo in the Dubbo Regional Council local government area of New South Wales, Australia. It is also known as CML Building and 116–120 Macquarie Street. The property is privately owned and was added to the New South Wales State Heritage Register on 2 April 1999.

== Description ==
The three-storey building has been repurposed and, in 2013, the ground floor was used as a cafe, travel agent, and other mixed retail. A dentist occupied some of the upper stories.

== History ==
The Australian Joint Stock Bank purchased a vacant site on the corner of Macquarie and Church Streets in 1879 for a new branch office in Dubbo. Construction began in 1884, overseen by local builder William Moffatt to plans prepared by Mr Brierly in his capacity as clerk of works. The new building opened to the public on 23 February 1885.

When the Australian Joint Stock Bank was absorbed into the newly established Australian Bank of Commerce on 31 December 1909, the Australian Bank of Commerce took over operation of the branch and guaranteed the deposits. A substantial refurbishment followed in 1920 after local builder George Palmer secured the tender for the works. The renovations introduced shopfronts on the ground floor facing both Macquarie and Church streets, office suites on the upper levels, and renovated residential accommodation for bank staff. In 1931, the Bank of New South Wales acquired the Australian Bank of Commerce and with it the Dubbo premises.

In March 1934, Dubbo tailor William Lockett purchased the building which subsequently became known as Lockett's Chambers. It remained in private ownership until December 1953 when it was sold to the Colonial Mutual Life Assurance Society. The building then became known as the Colonial Mutual Life Building.

== Heritage listing ==
Following a community campaign to preserve its historical value, the Colonial Mutual Life building was listed on the New South Wales State Heritage Register on 2 April 1999.
