= North Yeoval, New South Wales =

North Yeoval
- Town
- Coordinates: 32°43′S 148°41′E
- Country: Australia
- State: New South Wales
- LGA: Cabonne Council

Government
  - State electorate: Dubbo
  - Federal division: Calare

Population
  - Total: 95 (SAL 2021)
- Postcode: 2868
- County: Gordon
- Parish: Loombah

North Yeoval is a locality in New South Wales, Australia, within Cabonne Council. It is the part of the village of Yeoval north of Buckinbah Creek. North Yeoval is where the railway station was located as well as where the grain silos and bulk head are positioned. The Yeoval cemetery is also located in North Yeoval. Somerset Drive was named after the county of Somerset in the U.K. where the town of Yeovil is located.

Until 2026, North Yeoval lied within Dubbo Regional Council (previously Wellington Council prior to 2016), while the rest of Yeoval lied within the Cabonne Council. The dividing line was the Buckinbah Creek. In 2024, a new proposal to have local government boundaries altered so the whole village lies within the Cabonne Council area was again raised. Previous attempts were made in the 1950s and again in the 1990s but both proposals were unsuccessful. The proposal was successful and took effect on 1 July 2026, with the locality located within Cabonne Council since then.
