= Eulomogo =

Town in New South Wales, Australia

- Town
- Location within New South Wales
- Coordinates: 32°16′0″S 148°40′59″E
- Country: Australia
- State: New South Wales
- Local government area: Dubbo Regional Council
- Elevation: 319 m (1,047 ft)

Population
  - Total: 1,373

Eulomogo is a town in the Dubbo Regional Council, New South Wales, Australia. It has a population of 1,373.
