= Mogriguy =

Mogriguy New South Wales
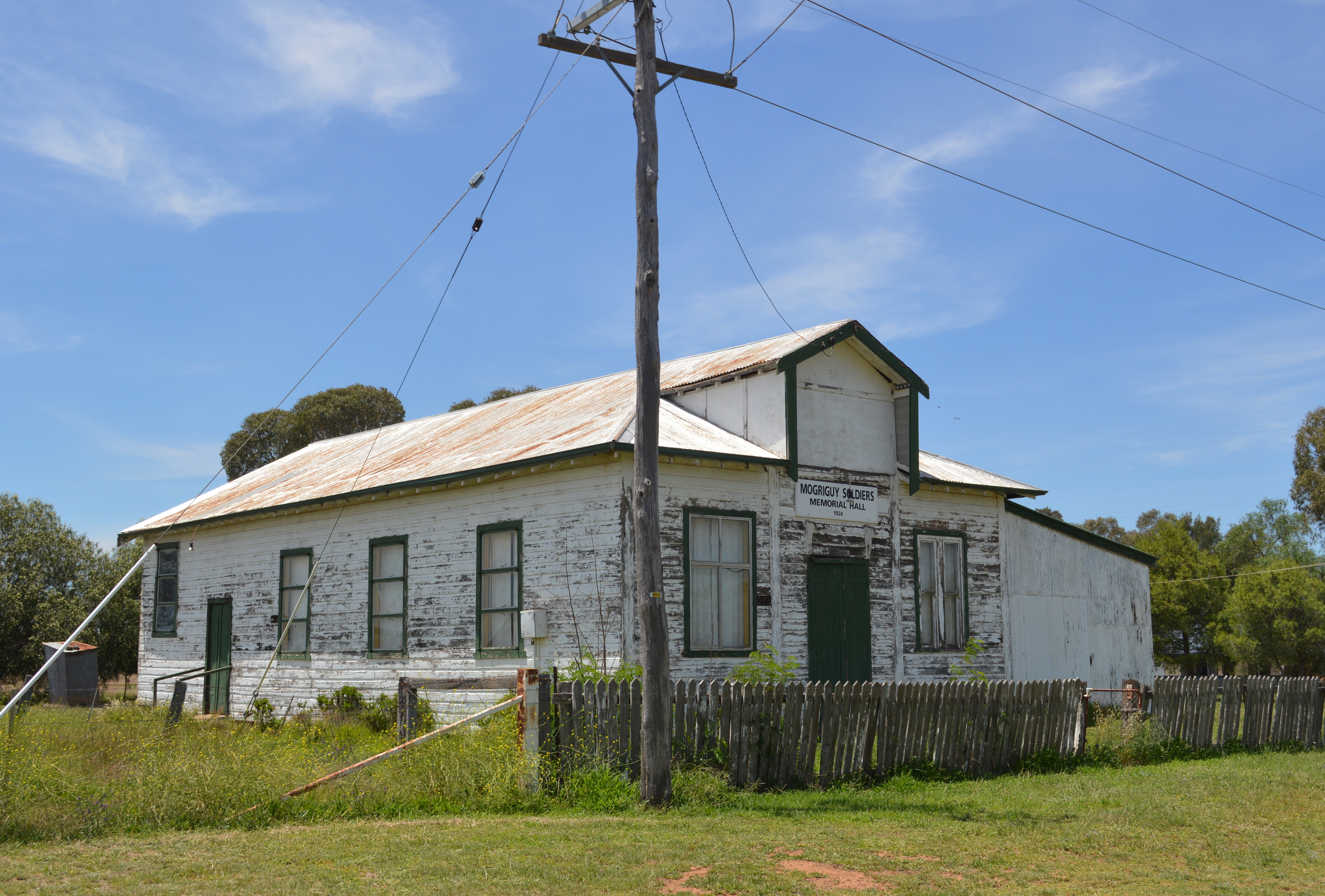
- Soldiers Memorial Hall, 2017

- Coordinates: 32°03′44″S 148°39′51″E
- Population: 122 (SAL 2021)
- Postcode(s): 2830
- Location: 407 km (253 mi) NW of Sydney; 23 km (14 mi) N of Dubbo
- LGA(s): Dubbo Regional Council
- State electorate(s): Dubbo
- Federal division(s): Parkes

Mogriguy is a small village located approximately 30 km north of Dubbo in central west New South Wales, Australia. Situated on the Mogriguy Road, and the Dubbo Coonamble branch railway line, it has a population of about 25.

The area surrounding the village is predominantly sheep grazing and wheat growing country. Once the centre of a vibrant local community, with a wheat silo, town hall, school, tennis courts, cricket ground and post office and general store, Mogriguy experienced a severe decline with the construction of the sealed Mogriguy/Dubbo road, which allowed easy access to the much larger centre of Dubbo. Recent years have seen a further decline in the area, as the severe drought affecting most of New South Wales has limited agricultural productivity.

The boundaries of Mogriguy partially include Mogriguy National Park, created in 2005.
