= Dubbo RAAF Stores Depot =

Former Royal Australian Air Force establishment

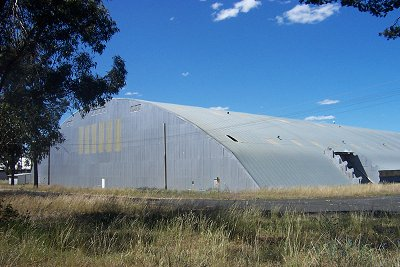
- Igloo building

- Location within New South Wales Location within Australia
- 32°15′35″S 148°37′10″E
- Location: Cobra Street, Dubbo, New South Wales, Australia

History
- Built: 1940–1943

Site notes
- Architect(s): Sidney Williams & Co
- Owner: Andorra Developments; Belmorgan Property Development

New South Wales Heritage Register
- Official name: Dubbo RAAF Stores Depot (former); No. 5 (1942); No. 6 Stores Depot (1942–52); No. 2 Stores Depot Detachment D (1952–92); Defence National Storage and Distribution Centre Detachment (1992–1995)
- Type: State heritage (built)
- Designated: 29 June 2004
- Reference no.: 1701
- Type: Military aircraft
- Category: Defence

The Dubbo RAAF Stores Depot is a heritage-listed former Royal Australian Air Force (RAAF) stores depot in Dubbo, New South Wales, Australia. The depot, located on Cobra Street, was designed by Sidney Williams & Co and built from 1940 to 1943. It is also known as Dubbo RAAF Stores Depot (former) and was formerly named No. 5 Stores Depot (1942); No. 6 Stores Depot (1942–52); No. 2 Stores Depot Detachment D (1952–92) and Defence National Storage and Distribution Centre Detachment (1992–1995). The property is owned by private companies, Andorra Developments and Belmorgan Property Development. The depot was added to the New South Wales State Heritage Register on 29 June 2004.

== History ==
In 1874, a large chunk of land abutting the south end of the Dubbo Common was notified as "Reserve Not For Sale No.442", of which the former RAAF Stores Depot is the largest remnant. In parish maps between 1916 and 1933 it was marked Blocks 147 and 148, and remained bushland dedicated to "public recreation" with a "gravel pit" marked in its north-west sector. It was said to be known as "Bradfield Park". Around 1919, as a result of the Amending Forestry Act of 1916, this area became the Dubbo Acclimatisation Area. Dubbo State Forest No. 807 was dedicated in 1927, two years after the railway spur line to Molong cut across the site.

In the Great Depression of the 1930s the area was known as "Bagtown" because it was inhabited by a number of families who camped there in makeshift tents. It is likely that these people included Aboriginal families.

=== Development of site during World War II ===
The declaration of World War II in September 1939 led to Australia's involvement and to the systematic expansion of defence sites which had begun in the mid-1930s. The construction of prefabricated and pre-cut structures is consistent with the rapid increase in military facilities around Australia which followed the Japanese attack on Pearl Harbor and America's entry into the war. Australian concerns as to the safety of Australian territory were borne out when Darwin was bombed by the Japanese in February 1942.

The RAAF operated ten stores depots around Australia during World War II and Dubbo was one of two within NSW. Its siting at Dubbo is important for illustrating the military decision to locate training and maintenance depots well inland, away from coastal areas and carrier-borne aircraft. Several sites in inland NSW were surveyed in February 1942, and in April Dubbo was chosen in preference to Orange and Parkes. The Commonwealth Government bought the state forestry land from the NSW Government in 1943 for A£1,911. Dubbo was well sited within the triangle formed by the "Strategic Land Corridors" between Bourke, Sydney and Melbourne, and was also located conveniently to the "Brisbane Line" (running from Brisbane to Melbourne or from Brisbane to Adelaide). In December 1942 the RAAF Stores Depot No. 5 (renamed No. 6) was formed at Waterloo, Sydney, before being quickly moved to Dubbo. Stores Depot No.5 was never built. Stores Depots 1-4 were located in the suburbs of the capital cities. Like the Dubbo base, Stores Depots 7 and 10 were located well inland to support training and maintenance functions. Stores Depots 8, 9, and 11 supported operational units in the northern areas of Australia.

Built at the same time as several other RAAF premises in Dubbo (including the Dubbo Aerodrome and the "Barracks" for housing personnel), the selection of the RAAF Stores Depot No.6 site capitalised on its use by the NSW Forestry Department. The existing cypress pine forest and railway line allowed immediate rail servicing while camouflaging the site's military nature. Indeed, the site was referred to as "The Pines", due to the prominence of the State Forest vegetation. In June 1942 the State Forest was revoked. By July 1942, two Bellman Hangars were well under construction. By November 1942, the residential quarters in the associated Barracks were complete. By April 1943, all 27 buildings at the Dubbo Stores Depot were also complete and stores were arriving daily. The site was used to store aeroplane parts, wireless equipment, ammunition and bombs. By June 1945 there were approximately 866 men and women personnel, both military and civilian, employed by the RAAF in its six sites in the town of Dubbo. With the cessation of hostilities the RAAF Stores Depot at Dubbo was the largest in Australia in terms of its size and the stock held. A delegation from the Dubbo Chamber of Commerce inspected the site at the end of the war and was told that the total cost of construction had been over A£300,000.

The layout of the former RAAF Stores Depot indicates it was comprehensively planned as an entire complex with all new buildings. The buildings, features and roadways were constructed in such a way to deceive overhead observers. The layout of the streets for example followed the lines of the surrounding suburbs. Garden beds were created around buildings and planted with vegetables. The semi-underground PBX bunker (or Wireless Transmitting Station) was constructed in the centre of the site. The Igloo storage buildings are particularly important in illustrating the techniques employed to camouflage such large structures. In attempting to pass off these huge structures as hills, the buildings were oriented to minimise shadows and appropriately painted. Galvanised iron sheeting, cut to resemble tree shapes, was used to modify the profiles of their openings and gables. Much of this camouflage treatment has since been removed.

The former RAAF Stores Depot also made effective use of prefabricated building designs. These techniques accommodated the enormous demands made on the local construction authorities across Australia following the bombing of Darwin. The site displays five types of prefabricated buildings: the five Igloo stores buildings, three Bellman hangars, the Sidney Williams Hut, the Rabaul Store and former Inflammable Liquids Store. The site is unusual and important in its demonstration of the variety of design and innovative construction techniques used in prefabricated storage buildings constructed during World War II.

=== Development of the site, post-World War II ===
Most of the ten RAAF stores depots built around Australia were only temporary and were disbanded within the decade after the end of the war. The exceptions were those in Dubbo, Sandridge, Victoria, Waterloo, New South Wales and Drayton, Queensland. Only the RAAF Stores Depot, Dubbo remained in military operation until the 1990s. It functioned in the immediate post-war period as a receiving store, holding a large numbers of weapons and surplus stock. The RAAF unit was also acknowledged in the town history as having rendered flood relief to the town and surrounding areas in February 1955, and more generally having "rendered invaluable service both to the town brigade and the bush fire brigades". In 1951 the National Service used the depot to support training flights from the military aerodrome, now Dubbo Airport. The site was transferred to the Army in 1952, leading to it being disbanded in November 1953 and reformed as "No.2 Stores Depot, Detachment D". RAAF involvement ended in 1956. The operational life of Detachment D ended in 1992. From 1992 to 1995 the depot was used as a tri-service facility before becoming surplus to requirements. Two small blocks of land were alienated in 1971 and 2003, on the north west corner and the south west corner respectively, for sale or transfer to the Department of Health and the Vietnam Veterans Association. In 1997 the associated RAAF Barracks site in Dubbo was sold for residential development. In June 2003 the former RAAF Stores Depot site was also sold to Belmorgan Property Development, the first time the land had passed out of public ownership.

Post-war civilian uses included leasing a small block to Westhaven Sheltered Workshops 1960–1984, and another to the Health Department, eventually resulting in the sale of a section from the north-west corner of the site. This area is now owned by the NSW Department of Health and the Baptist Church. In 1976 another part of the site was leased to become the headquarters of the East Coast Plague Locust Commission. The former RAAF Stores Depot was an important component of the Civil Emergency services operations during and after the rebuilding of Darwin following Cyclone Tracy in 1974 and during a number of other civil disasters throughout the Pacific region during subsequent decades. In 1978 the Natural Disasters Organisation entered into an agreement with the Army to store materials for natural disaster relief. The Vietnam Veterans Association uses buildings at the south western corner of the site. Other storage uses have included: Harvey Norman storing furniture in the Rabaul store; Robert Holmes Transport storing palleted goods in buildings 10 and 18; police storing recovered stolen vehicles in building 5 and training police dogs; and Robert Samuels storage of baled hay in the Bellman hangars. Local craftspeople banded together in 1992, using the site as a workshop to build a new "State Coach" in honour of the visit of Queen Elizabeth II in 1992. There was also the 1999-2000 collaboration between French company Plasticiens Volants and the troupe of Aboriginal choreographer Raymond D. Blanco to produce a street theatre based on the Aboriginal dreamtime "Rainbow Serpent", which was constructed and rehearsed in the No.4 shed. Between 1945 and 1992 the depot was used intermittently to stage events such as conference, concerts, trade fairs and rodeos. The band Silverchair played a concert at the depot in 1997.

=== Redevelopment ===
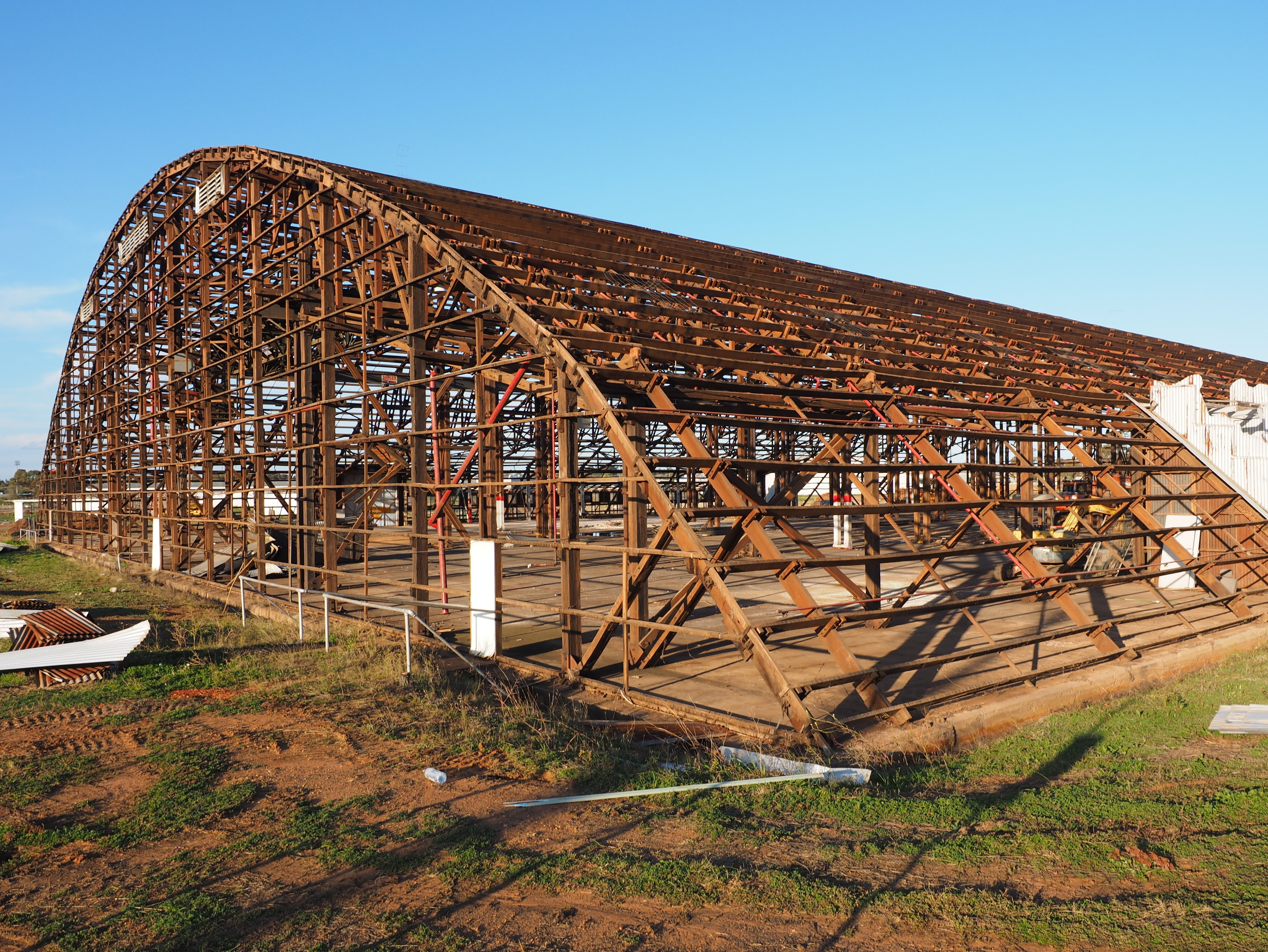
An igloo building with its roof removed at the former RAAF Stores Depot in August 2020

The former stores depot site was sold in 2011 to property developers. Plans to redevelop the site to include more than 400 houses, tourism and hospitality businesses and accommodation were approved by the NSW Office of Environment and Heritage in 2018. The Dubbo Local Council approved the redevelopment in 2019, and it received final approval from Heritage NSW in June 2020.

== Description ==
Encompassing an area of approximately 38 hectares (94 acres), the former RAAF Stores Depot is located south east of the centre of Dubbo and is surrounded by suburban development. The site is fenced and buildings are dispersed around its perimeter, connected to an internal sealed road network, which was aligned with the nearby urban blocks to suggest that the area was effectively an extension of the town. Buildings are surrounded by grassed areas, with forest remnants also present, predominantly in the southern and western areas of the site. The vegetation includes features remnant Eucalypt species, with grassland dominating in the north and east, and remnant pine forest (Callitris endlicheri) dominating the remainder. The site is currently used by "mobile fauna", such as threatened bats and birds, as a habitat area and stepping stone corridor between the Macquarie River and larger bushland tracts.

The eastern boundary of the site is defined by the line of the now disused Dubbo to Molong railway. This meant that short spur railway lines could be run to the site and into the two adjacent stores buildings, without the construction of a larger spur line which might have been visible from the air. The Mitchell Highway, the northern frontage of the site, is defined by a row of large trees, in contrast to the Palmer Street and High Street, western and southern, frontages which are dominated by callitris pine. Within the area the relief is less than five metres and slopes towards the north-east. The 30 buildings on site include five Igloo Stores buildings, three Bellman hangars, a Rabaul Store, a Sidney Williams Hut, a large semi-underground PBX bunker, a former Inflammable Liquids store, the Administration building and the Pump House, as well as the road system and railway spur lines.

Entry to the site is from Palmer Street through the administration buildings, at the northern end of the site. The five Igloo Stores buildings are scattered at some distance from each other to suggest that they are hills rather than buildings, in order to reduce the impact of aerial attack. This effect was reinforced by the use of camouflage to break up the outlines of the buildings, and by their orientation, designed to throw as little shadow as possible. Igloo Stores buildings 4 and 5 were located to take advantage of the existing railway line. Igloo Stores 7, 8 and 10 and the other structures were serviced by the internal roads.

The Heritage Impact Assessment divided the site into eight precincts composed of:

1. Special Uses Precinct (now owned by the Health Department and the Baptist Church);
2. Cobra Street Precinct including buildings 1, 2, 11 and 13;
3. the Entry Precinct including buildings 14, 15 and 37;
4. the Central Northern Precinct with buildings 3, 43 and 46;
5. the Central Southern Precinct, largely forest but including building 36;
6. the Western Precinct with Igloo building 10;
7. the Railway Precinct with Igloo buildings 4,5, the double Bellman hangar building 70, and buildings 39 and 73; and
8. the Southern Precinct with Igloo buildings 7 and 8, building 42 and the section occupied by the Vietnam Veterans.

Aboriginal relics

In 1999, consultations were held with the Dubbo Local Aboriginal Land Council and the Wirrimbah Direct Descendant Aboriginal Corporation. Two scarred trees on the site were identified as Aboriginal. Scarred trees result when bark or wood has been removed from a tree for the purpose of manufacturing material items such as shields, canoes or coolamon dishes and containers. Scars may also be the result of making footholds in a tree to collect food, such as possums or honey, or to facilitate the removal of bark. They are protected under the NPWS Act 1974. The study also identified an area of "open artefact scatter" on the basis of two stone artefacts found 30m apart on an exposed road cutting on the western side of the site. The artefacts may represent a camp site but elaboration of their significance requires more extensive archaeological investigation.

Igloo stores (Buildings 4, 5, 7, 8 and 11)

The five Igloo stores buildings type W3, 94.2 by 76.2 metres (309 ft × 250 ft), display innovative technical design in the use of prefabricated and pre-cut timber frames and trusses adapted from American designs to local materials. The sheer size of the Igloo buildings, both externally and internally, is breathtaking for the average person. They are an unusual, functional and attractive form of industrial structure that is evocative of war time design and construction practices. They are also significant in illustrating the techniques employed to camouflage such large structures. They were built initially at Dubbo without roof lights due to blackout requirements. They are constructed in classic post and truss framing in an arched configuration with hardwood frames, corrugated iron sheeting and concrete floors. There are five longitudinal rows of solid hardwood columns supporting transverse segmented Pratt trusses. The Pratt trusses span 15.7 metres (52 ft) between lines of columns with spaced pairs of members for top and bottom chords, single vertical compression members and spaced pairs of diagonal members. Trusses were fabricated from local hardwood with bolts and shear connectors. Gantry cranes service the two aisles of the building above a reinforced concrete floor slab. The end gables of the building were unadorned except for personnel doors. Each side of the building features a long series of offices between the main sets of access doors. There is extensive perimeter drainage to cope with the rainwater run off generated by the roof areas and latrines on one side. The buildings were carefully oriented to minimise shadowing in order to resemble hills from an aerial perspective. On completion the profiles of the openings and gables were also modified by the use of galvanised iron sheeting cut to resemble tree shapes. The five igloos at Dubbo, and a similar building, Warehouse 11 at the Macrossan Stores Depot in Queensland, are the only surviving examples of this building type in Australia.

Bellman hangars

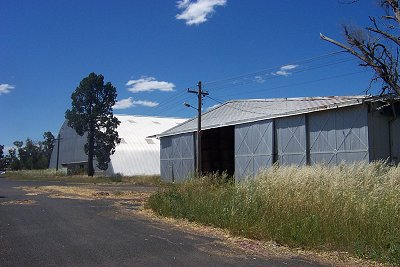
Igloo building and double Bellman Hangar

The three Bellman Hangars provide evidence of very early prefabrication techniques in use for buildings in Australia. The double hangar (building 70) and the two single hangars (buildings 2 and 3) were used as mixed- and bulk stores. The British design used a pitched roof and gabled steel frame to provide a standardised design for aircraft maintenance, with sliding doors at each end allowing maximum access. Internal lighting is by high level, clerestory windows. During World War II steel was considered an essential material for armaments and, although steel was available for buildings, many Bellman Hangars were constructed with a framework of unseasoned Australian hardwood.

Underground PBX bunker

Approximately 6 by 18 metres (20 ft × 59 ft), this was a component of the communications centre for the region, one of three such bunkers, which provided a critical regional command and communications role to support the operations of the depot and the RAAF during the war. It is a reinforced barrel vaulted structure partly underground covered by mounding. It has a simple form with one set of timber entrance doors.

Rabaul Store (Building 1)

This is of steel-framed construction, 84.1 by 18.3 metres (276 ft × 60 ft), clad in corrugated galvanised iron. Gabled, symmetrical form with aisles. The lower level is lit by a horizontal band of windows and accessed by three sliding doors each side. Stairs at the southern end providing access to the timber framed mezzanine floor which surrounds the central areas which are open from ridge to ground floor. The Rabaul Store Building No. 1 was one of two prefabricated steel buildings constructed at Laverton in Victoria. The other was sent to Toowoomba following the fall of Rabaul during the Second World War. The Rabaul Store was the only known example of its type to survive on Defence property.

The Sidney William Hut

The corrugated iron-clad shed or workshop identified in the study by Graham Brooks (1999) is a prefabricated Sidney William's Hut. This was the colloquial name given to the Comet building designed by Sidney Williams & Co and used extensively during the Second World War. The buildings featured a lightweight, rigid, steel angle frame with the walls and gabled roof clad with 26-gauge, corrugated, galvanised iron, manufactured in Sydney, NSW. The design is characterised by supporting brackets at the eaves and small rectangular windows. This is a good example of one of the earliest examples of prefabrication used by the Commonwealth from 1935. It is one of the few such structures still associated with a Defence site.

Administration and support buildings

These comprise storage sheds, latrines, smaller site service structures, the Motor Transport Garage and the Pump House which serviced the firefighting equipment. Storage and open service sheds and latrines are clad in corrugated galvanised iron or weatherboard below galvanised iron or asbestos cement roofing. These are in general characteristic of the range of supporting and administrative structures which housed the necessary ancillary functions on such large military sites. The Administration Building has a hipped tiled roof, characteristic of similar domestic-scale buildings erected by the Commonwealth Government at that time. Full timber cladding was used in preference to the commoner vernacular weatherboard and asbestos cement sheet cladding. The Pump House, in conjunction with the water storage tank, clearly illustrates the need to differentiate materials storage and the risks associated with such storage, and is also clearly part of the safety regime needed on such sites. The former Inflammable Liquids Store (building 11) is a good example of a medium-sized, pre-cut timber-framed workshop. The Guardhouse (building 15) of similar design idiom, is clad with weatherboard below a gabled roof covered with corrugated galvanised iron.

Associated RAAF facilities in Dubbo

The full extent of the RAAF military base at Dubbo comprised six sites including and clustered around the Stores Depot. These were:

- Aerodrome: Prior to World War II, Dubbo already had an airstrip which was suitable for small aircraft only. During the early stages of the war, land was resumed from the Fitzgerald family for a new landing strip. It is located on the Narromine Road about 5 km from Dubbo. The aerodrome was constructed around the same time as the Stores Depot and in 1943 had as many as six planes landing per day. A weatherboard building was constructed on the site to be used as a store room for goods. Around May 1946, the aerodrome began to be used for civil operations. It was operated and managed by the RAAF for many decades after the war until it became Dubbo City airport, now owned by Dubbo City Council.
- Camp/barracks site: The camp or barracks site is the other principal site (the first being the Stores Depot). The camp was built simultaneously with the depot and completed by November 1942. It provided all living accommodation for all staff. The camp comprising 8.6 hectares was constructed in Thorby Ave in south Dubbo to the east of the depot. The site was stripped and replaced with a different street layout and a new infrastructure. Recently it was sold and advertised as the "Barracks Estate" for residential development. The current hospital was Building No. 31 in the camp.
- Sick quarters: The sick quarters facility was built in north Dubbo, about two miles beyond the Camp. The buildings were reported to be complete in March 1943. They were closed on 9 April 1947. The quarters were small but separate from other civilian hospitals in the town.
- Fuel depot: The fuel depot or bulk oil storage site is located at Bourke Hill along the railway, west of the station and town centre. Fuel depots were required for operational and training purposes were located at certain inland areas where they were secure from attack. The tanks were underground and constructed from concrete and steel, covered with about 0.75m of soil and with a permanent guard. Regular maintenance was undertaken by contract which continued until 1944 when the RAAF no longer controlled No. 19 Inland Fuel Depot and was handed over to the Shell company.
- Wireless transmission building site: The Wireless Transmission building site, bunker or signals and cipher building is located about 2 km east of Dubbo. An underground bunker, it was reported to be 33.5m by 5.5m of concrete construction. The building was one of three communication stations forming a trinagular network which commanded the air defence system for the Dubbo region. It is now known as the Keswick Estate.

Conclusion

At the end of World War II the Dubbo Stores Depot was the largest stores depot of its kind in Australia in both size and stock. The site features five types of prefabricated buildings and it is unusual to find all of these together. The pristine condition of the buildings is seen as the result of several factors including: superior hardwood used in construction; simple construction with no problem areas; dry climate conditions; and military standards of maintenance. The buildings have a political and technical significance for indicating how standing design preferences and practices were overthrown as part of national wartime reorganisation. Technologies that had previously had little impact in Australia were used extensively while technologies introduced by the USA military were embraced. Unseasoned local hardwood, a material that had previously been regarded as unsuitable for large buildings, achieved primacy. The technical achievements of this period for timber construction can hardly be overstated. The longest span and most widespread timber structures in Australian history were constructed in this period. Almost every species of Australian timber was placed in extreme field test.

The site is a coherent and intact demonstration of a 1940s military cultural landscape. The strategic choice of Dubbo for the depot site placed it well out of range of carrier borne aircraft; the extant prominent ring road on the heavily wooded site was a natural extension of the neighbouring urban pattern; the 30 buildings were scattered around the site with the five huge Igloo store buildings fitted with jagged edge roof profiles and barrel vaulted volumes to cast broken shadows and painted in camouflage to resemble hills. The choice of a site immediately adjacent to the railway meant that spur lines could be taken into the two adjacent Igloo stores without the construction of a large spur line that would have been more easily spotted from aerial reconnaissance. All of these elements were specifically orchestrated and integrated for defence purposes and have a direct bearing on the continued cultural significance of the site.

=== Condition ===
As of 10 September 2003, this complex of substantial military structures in their original configuration and landscaping was the only extant, relatively intact example of its kind in Australia. The Steele and Dallas "Aboriginal Archaeological Assessment" recommended archaeological excavation of the open campsite area where stone artifacts were found (named "DSD1", 2003, 42).

This complex of substantial military structures in their original configuration and landscaping is the only extant, relatively intact example of its kind in Australia. All buildings are in pristine condition.

=== Further information ===
The site of 38 hectares (94 acres) is relatively flat, falling some 5m from south-east to the north-west by Cobra Street. A small creek drains the site, but no original creeks banks remain. The geology consists of weathered gravel, clays and silt over sandstone bedrock. The vegetation is mostly grasslands with native cypress pine, some kurrajongs trees and box eucalypts. The trees are concentrated towards the south where the cypresses are most common. The native grasses were grazed and slashed intermittently giving a park-like landscape with vistas through the trees.

== Heritage listing ==
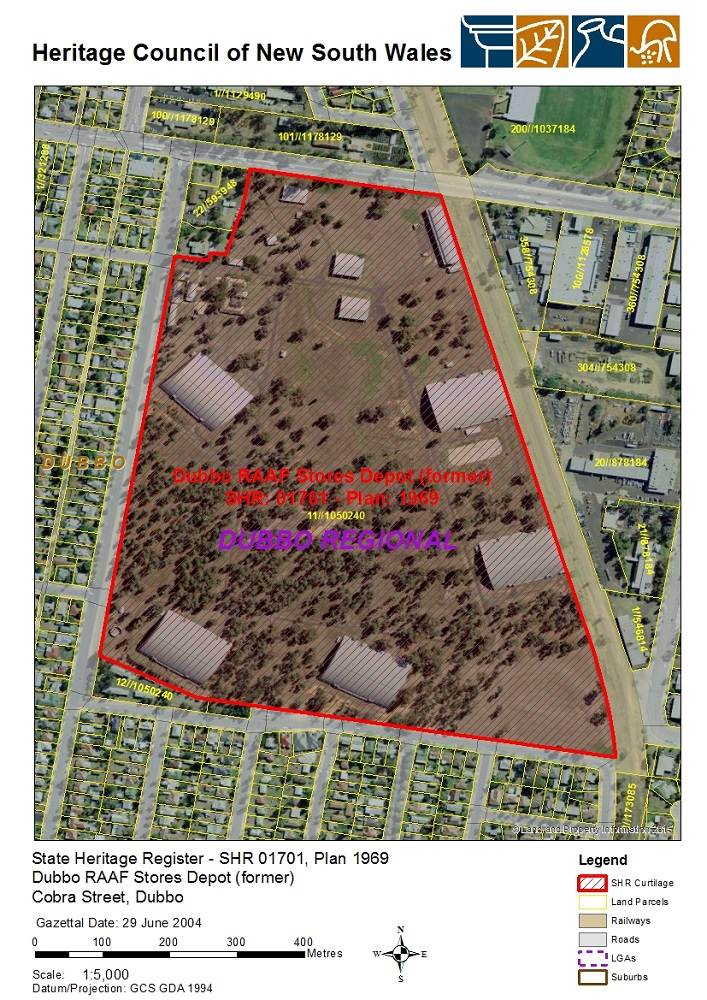
Heritage boundaries

As of 9 September 2003, the former RAAF Stores Depot at Dubbo, a complex of 1940s military storage buildings, is significant as a large and intact example of NSW's participation in the network of military bases that were erected in strategic locations around Australia during World War II. Encompassing an area of approximately 38 hectares near the centre of Dubbo city, the former RAAF Stores Depot features thirty buildings including five huge Igloo stores buildings, three Bellman hangars, a Rabaul hangar, a Sidney Williams Hut and a large semi-underground PBX bunker, as well as a road system, railway spur lines and remnant state forest. This complex of substantial military structures in their original configuration and landscaping is the only extant, relatively intact example of its kind in Australia. It is unusual and probably unique in Australia to find five different types of 1940s prefabricated buildings remaining on the one site. The Igloo stores, still in pristine condition, were adapted from an American design but using Australian hardwood and corrugated iron, and are five of the only six examples of this building type left standing in Australia. The prefabricated steel-framed Rabaul hangar is the only structure of its kind still extant in Australia. The site is a coherent 1940s cultural landscape that combines forestry remnants with the careful placement of the buildings to result in a site that was innovatively camouflaged to reduced the risk of aerial attack. As the only World War II stores depot to remain in military service until the 1990s, the former RAAF Stores Depot is important for its historic association with the development of Australia's defence over 50 years. The site also has heritage significance for its association with Aboriginal relics, previous forestry uses of the landscape, its use as a makeshift camp during the Great Depression, and more recent community and recreational uses.

Dubbo RAAF Stores Depot was listed on the New South Wales State Heritage Register on 29 June 2004 having satisfied the following criteria.

The building was assessed for listing on the Commonwealth Heritage List; however, it was deemed ineligible.

The place is important in demonstrating the course, or pattern, of cultural or natural history in New South Wales.

The former RAAF Stores Depot at Dubbo, a complex of 1940s military storage buildings in their original configuration and landscaping, is significant as the largest and most intact example of the network of RAAF stores depots that were erected in strategic locations around Australia during World War II. The full collection of buildings, including the five Igloo stores, the three Bellman hangars and the Rabaul store, together with the various support buildings, internal roadways, connecting railway spur-lines and scattered siting, clearly demonstrate the scale and operational systems of a major wartime logistics depot for the RAAF. Moreover, the site can be seen to exemplify the notion of a cultural landscape that has evolved over an extended period. Various aspects of its historic cultural layers - including inhabitation by Aboriginal people, associations with State Forestry, uses by unemployed people during the Depression, uses by the military during and after World War II, participation in the management of civil emergencies in the postwar period, and recreational uses by the Dubbo community - can be read in the landscape and in the buildings. As the only World War II stores depot to remain in military service until the 1990s, the former RAAF Stores Depot is important for its historic association with the development of Australia's defence over 50 years.

The place has a strong or special association with a person, or group of persons, of importance of cultural or natural history of New South Wales's history.

The former RAAF Stores Depot has strong associations with the thousands of military personnel and civilian employees who worked there between 1942 and 1996. It is also significant to the Dubbo community for its association with the major role played by the RAAF and the Australian military generally in economic and social life during World War II and over the succeeding decades.

The place is important in demonstrating aesthetic characteristics and/or a high degree of creative or technical achievement in New South Wales.

The RAAF Stores Depot, Dubbo is significant for demonstrating the principal characteristics of military stores depots erected during World War II, in terms of both landscape and buildings. The landscape is significant for demonstrating the retention of trees as a strategy for camouflaging the site to minimise the risk of aerial attack. The resulting stand of Cypress pines also harks back to the State Forestry uses of the landscape, and is representative of the original vegetative cover of the Dubbo region, as a remnant which escaped the rigours of intense and cyclical farming that has altered much of the rural landscape in the region. The contemporary large scale, open and wooded nature of the site, with its scatter of very large storage buildings, also provides a unique component of the urban character of Dubbo. The Igloo stores, Bellman hangars, Sidney Williams Hut, Rabaul store and former Inflammable Liquids store are of exceptional interest, as a group, for demonstrating the range of prefabricated and pre-cut structures and building technology employed and developed during World War II. The buildings have a political and technical significance for indicating how standing design preferences and practices were overthrown as part of national wartime reorganisation.

The place has a strong or special association with a particular community or cultural group in New South Wales for social, cultural or spiritual reasons.

The RAAF Stores Depot, Dubbo, is significant for its military and employment associations for people who worked on this site during and since World War II. There are also strong cultural associations between these buildings and times of national change and stress. The site is also significant for its association with Aboriginal relics, previous forestry uses of the landscape, its use as a makeshift camp during the Great Depression, and more recent community and recreational uses. Given its large size, unique landscape and built features and suburban location, the former RAAF site is an integral part of the urban identity of Dubbo. The Defence buildings on the site are culturally significant as a demonstration of the versatility and self-reliance of the Australian Government and people in a time of national emergency.

The former RAAF Depot Site, Dubbo has been identified as being of significance to the Aboriginal community in Dubbo. There are two layers of significance. The first is associated with tribal Aboriginal people who lived in the area before European settlement and who were responsible for the scarred trees. The second is associated with Aboriginal people who lived in Dubbo in the late nineteenth and early twentieth centuries and who camped at "the Pines" when the site was part of the State Forest before being bought by the Department of Defence c.1941.

Consultation with the Aboriginal community in 2003, which included meeting with a number of Elders, confirmed that the former RAAF Depot site is an important place in the living memory of the Dubbo Aboriginal community. Several generations of people had lived in tents and shanty buildings in the native bushland in the State Forest that later became the RAAF base, that was known as "the Pines. Older people in the community had fond memories and would retell stories of the time spent there. It came up frequently in oral history recollections. The Aboriginal people living in the Pines were moved out to make way for the RAAF base in the early 1940s and there were few Aboriginal memories associated with the site once the military moved in. Only one or two Aboriginal people were recalled as having worked there. It was thought that the scarred trees on the RAAF base site would have been marked by earlier tribal Aboriginal people rather than by the twentieth century Pines community. The existence of Aboriginal burial sites was not advised at the meeting.

The place has potential to yield information that will contribute to an understanding of the cultural or natural history of New South Wales.

The former RAAF Stores Depot is of significance for the expansion it provided to Dubbo's traditional role as a regional freight handling hub within national transportation networks. It is of significance for the role of the depot and its personnel in the regional economic development of Dubbo during World War II. The variety and arrangement of innovative, prefabricated and other stores buildings, constructed during World War II, provides an intact example of a 1940s military cultural landscape. It also has research significance for its Aboriginal relics, especially in relation to the recommended archaeological excavation of the "open artifact scatter" on the western side.

The place possesses uncommon, rare or endangered aspects of the cultural or natural history of New South Wales.

The five Igloos at Dubbo, alongside a similar building at the Macrossan Stores Depot in Queensland, are the only surviving examples of this building type in Australia. The Rabaul Store is the only known example of its type to survive on Defence property. The five Igloos, the Bellman Hangars, Rabaul Store, former Inflammable Liquids store and supporting and administrative structures in context with the site comprise the only extant, relatively intact example of its kind, due to the progressive disposal and demolition of other components of the major nationwide wartime RAAF Logistics network in the postwar period.

The place is important in demonstrating the principal characteristics of a class of cultural or natural places/environments in New South Wales.

The RAAF Stores Depot, Dubbo is significant for demonstrating the principal characteristics of military stores depots erected during World War II, both in terms of site planning, orientation and landscaping; and also in terms of design and construction techniques characteristic of the range of prefabricated and pre-cut storage buildings. The three Bellman hangars at Dubbo are representative of Bellman Hangars erected on sites around Australia during and after the Second World War. The Sidney Williams Hut is a good example of one of the earliest examples of prefabrication used by the Commonwealth from 1935. The former Inflammable Liquids Store is a good example of the range of medium size, pre-cut timber framed workshop and storage buildings. The supporting and administrative buildings are in general characteristic of the range of supporting and administrative structures which housed the necessary ancillary functions on such large military sites. Of particular interest are the domestic scale Administration Building and the Pump House. The latter, in conjunction with the water storage tank, clearly illustrates the need to differentiate materials storage and the risks associated with such storage, and is also clearly part of the safety regime needed on such sites. The site is characteristic of sites developed during the Second World War in its location on, and use of, existing railway infrastructure.
