= James Samuels (politician) =

Australian public figure

James Samuels (1835-1927), also known as the Grand Old Man, was an early immigrant to the then village of Dubbo, New South Wales. Born in Bristol, United Kingdom, in 1835 he moved to Melbourne in 1850 before making his way to Dubbo in 1856. He enjoyed much success west of the divide and lead a public life; including his key role in the proclamation of the town of Dubbo in 1872 and as Dubbo's first mayor. Samuels' efforts both publicly and privately were foundational to many Dubbo institutions. His long philanthropic life had an enduring influence in the development of the central west. His name no longer adorns a wing at the Dubbo Hospital..

== Government ==
Samuels, with T. Frawley, collected 102 signatures to petition the Colonial Secretary of New South Wales for the formation of the Dubbo Municipality. On 18 February the Colonial Secretary informed Samuels that the Governor of NSW was pleased to constitute the Dubbo Municipal District, resulting in the proclamation of the town of Dubbo on 19 February 1872.

The first council election was held on 22 April 1872, and Samuels was elected to sit alongside T. Frawley, W. Moffat, A. Thompson, N. Muller, and G.H. Taylor. At the first council meeting Samuels was elected mayor. He was then elected mayor for the first three years in succession. Speaking thirty years later, Taylor said of Samuels: "as the first Mayor, and I may say the father of the Municipal Council, he successfully steered the Municipal barque on her first voyage." Samuels was elected to the Dubbo Council for many years after his mayoral terms.

== Law ==
Samuels was one of the first magistrates appointed in the district and continued to serve as a justice of the peace throughout his life. Upon his death he was the oldest serving justice of the peace in the district.

== Dubbo hospital ==
Samuels was one of the founders of the Dubbo District Hospitals. He was at the meeting of subscribers to the Hospital Fund that was held in February, 1866. Those present voted to form the Committee of the Hospital Building Fund, a precursor to the Hospital Board, electing, J.C. Ryrie, J.C. Christie, J. Samuels Jnr., A Smellie, and W.W. Brocklehurst. Samuels was additionally elected as treasurer. Samuels continued to serve the hospital and retained his positions as treasurer and trustee until his death 60 years later. During his life, Samuels donated three blocks of his land to the hospital.

At the Hospital Board meeting fifty years after the construction of the first Dubbo District Hospital in 1867, several of the committee members praised Samuel' "unique" contribution as they passed a motion to celebrate both his and the hospital's golden jubilee jointly. On 2 June 1930, the Samuel's Ward was opened "in honour of the memory of the late James Samuels" who had died three years prior.

== Dubbo Public School ==
Samuels was one of the first members of the Dubbo School Board; established in 1857, a year before the first public school building was erected on Macquarie Street in 1858. A new public school building was built over the years 1873 and 1874 on Darling Street. It was paid for partly by the sale of the old school land and building to the bank and J.E. Serisier respectively, as well as a donation of £150 from the estate of W.W. Brocklehurst. It is probable that this donation was at the direction of Samuels, whom Brocklehurst had left as his attorney upon returning to England in 1871. He provided the stipulation for Samuels to distribute money in his name to the worthy causes of the town. In the early 1870s Samuels replaced Serisier as the official Patron of the Dubbo Public School.

== Anglican church ==
Samuels was central to the construction of the first Church of England church in Dubbo, and the preeminent position it had as the parish centre. He was a Church Warden and trustee from 1863 and served uninterrupted for the remainder of his life. Upon his death he was the Chief Warden of the Holy Trinity Church.

== Mechanics Institute ==
Samuels was a foundation and lifelong member of the Mechanics Institute in Dubbo. He was a trustee of the property on which it stood, as well as other properties belonging to the institute. The income from these other properties was used to maintain primary building and further the cultural needs of Dubbo. Samuels also served as the president of the institute.

== Agriculture ==
Samuels was one of the founders of the Agricultural Society, first called the North Western Pastoral and Agricultural Association. Dubbo's first Agricultural Show was held on 23 March 1873, at which he acted as a judge for most of the produce. In that first show, Samuels took first prize for coarse wool. He was a breeder of shorthorn cattle, jersey cattle, heavy horses, and sheep on his pastoral land along the Macquarie River. He went on to chair the board of the Agricultural Show Society and had many more successes as an exhibitor.

== Water ==
Samuels was the first to identify and make a study of underground water aquifers and artesian springs in the Dubbo basin. His study 'Water Systems of the Interior' was published in The Empire magazine on 14 August 1868. The editor of the magazine was impressed by Samuel's observations and theories, and he recommended the article as "worthy of attention" for all those looking to settle west of the divide.

The Great Western Coal Mining Co., of which Samuels was chairman, discovered artesian water at Ballimore Hill in 1887 while drilling bores in the area. Samuels had samples sent to Sydney for testing, which confirmed the purity of the water as well as the presence of mineral aquifer.

== Mining ==
Samuels had an active role in mining and prospecting around the district. He drew geological maps that he contributed tot eh public record. He personally prospected sites, raised funds, and encouraged the formation of companies. He contributed to the development of mining for gold, gemstone, coal, copper, and gas in the district and acted as chairman and treasurer for several companies engaged in such activities.

== Gas and lighting ==
A gas company was formed in 1881 to connect Dubbo with gas, which was accomplished in May 1882. G. Kitchen was manager of the gasworks and James Samuels was chairman of the company. In 1890 the private company was taken over by the Dubbo Council. Samuels continues in his position as chairman of the Board of Directors of the Dubbo Gas Company for decades.

== Land Board ==
Samuels first sat on the Dubbo Land Board on 16 February 1898, became chairman of the board, and served on the board until his resignation in 1909.
