= Wellington Council =

Former local government area in New South Wales, Australia

- Local government area
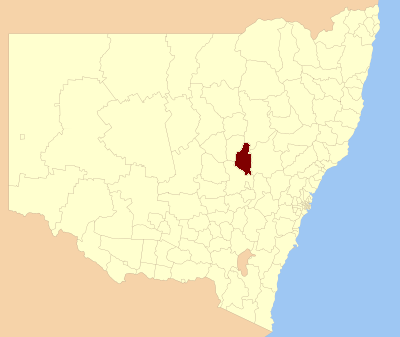
- Location in New South Wales
- Coordinates: 32°33′S 148°56′E
- Country: Australia
- State: New South Wales
- Region: Orana
- Abolished: 12 May 2016
- Council seat: Wellington

Government
  - Mayor: Anne Jones (Independent)
  - State electorate: Orange
  - Federal division: Parkes

Area
  - Total: 4,113 km^{2} (1,588 sq mi)

Population
  - Total: 8,493 (2011 census)
  - Density: 2.06/km^{2} (5.3/sq mi)
- Website: Wellington Council
LGAs around Wellington Council
Dubbo	Warrumbungle	Upper Hunter
Dubbo	Wellington Council	Mid-Western
Cabonne	Cabonne	Mid-Western

Wellington Council was a local government area in the Orana region of New South Wales, Australia. The former area is located adjacent to the Macquarie River and the Mitchell Highway.

A 2015 review of local government boundaries recommended that the Wellington Council merge with the City of Dubbo to form a new council with an area of 7,536 square kilometres (2,910 sq mi) and support a population of approximately 51,000. Following an independent review, on 12 May 2016, the Minister for Local Government announced the dissolution of the Wellington Shire Council and the Dubbo City Council, together with the establishment of the Western Plains Regional Council with immediate effect.

The former Wellington Council area included Wellington, Maryvale, Geurie, North Yeoval, Dripstone, Mumbil, Stuart Town and Euchareena.

== Council ==
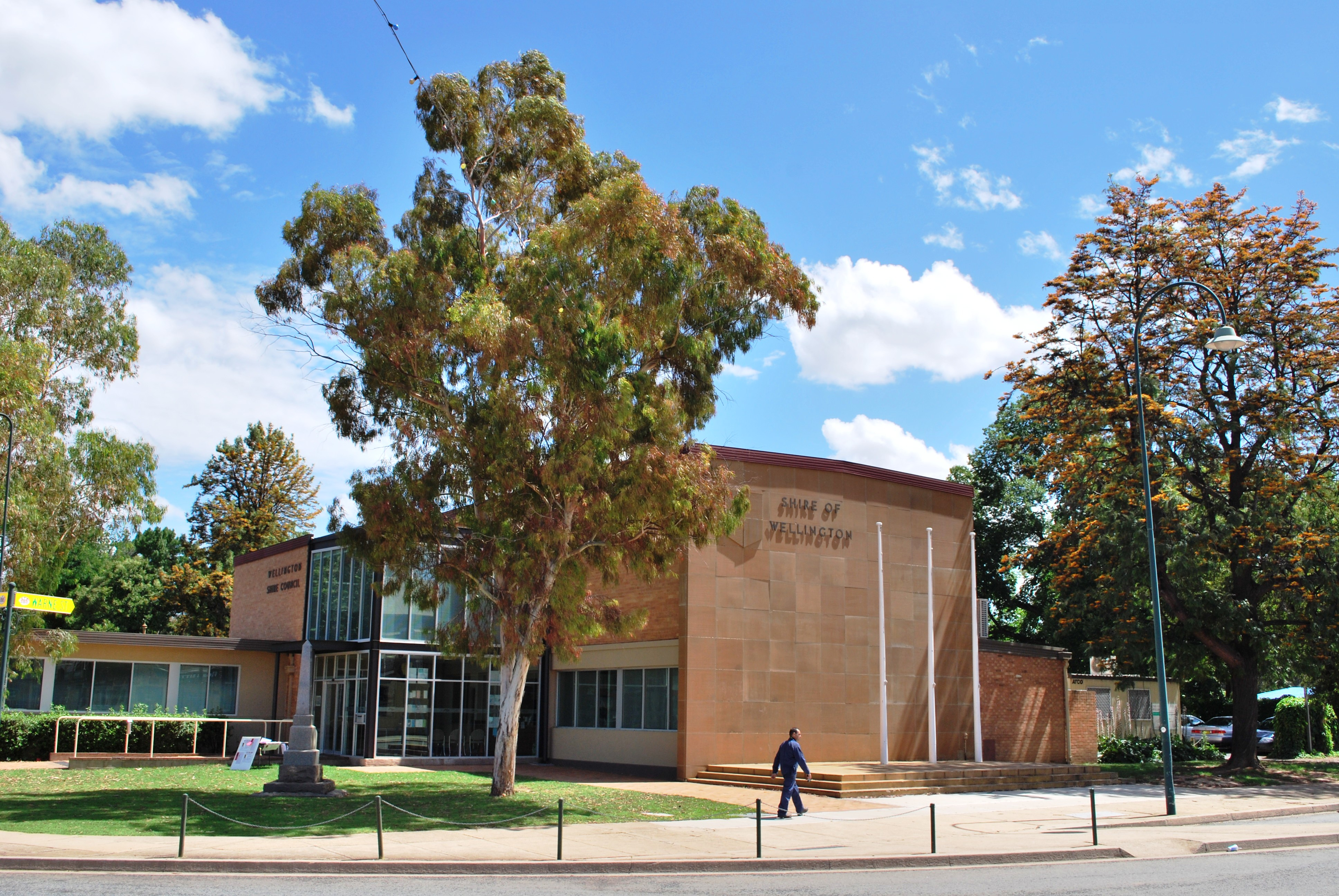
Council offices, in Wellington.

=== Former composition and election method ===
Prior to its dissolution, Wellington Council was composed of nine councillors elected proportionally as a single ward. All councillors were elected for a fixed four-year term of office. The mayor was elected by the councillors at the first meeting of the council. The most recent election was held on 8 September 2012, and the makeup of the former council was as follows:

Party	Councillors
Independents	9
Total	9

The final Council, elected in 2012 and dissolved in 2016, in order of election, was:

Councillor	Party	Notes
Anne Jones	Independent	Mayor
Pip Smith	Independent	
Mark Griggs	Independent	
David Grant	Independent	
Rod Buhr	Independent	
Graham Cross	Independent	Deputy Mayor
Terry Dray	Independent	
Marcus Hanney	Independent	
Alison Conn	Independent	
