= Toongi, New South Wales =

Toongi
- Town
- Coordinates: 32°26′25″S 148°35′46″E
- Country: Australia
- State: New South Wales
- LGA: Dubbo Regional Council

Government
  - State electorate: Dubbo
  - Federal division: Parkes

Population
  - Total: 61 (2016)
- Postcode: 2820
- County: Gordon
- Parish: Loombah

Toongi is a locality in Dubbo Regional Council, New South Wales, Australia.
