= Milestone Hotel, Dubbo =

Milestone Hotel
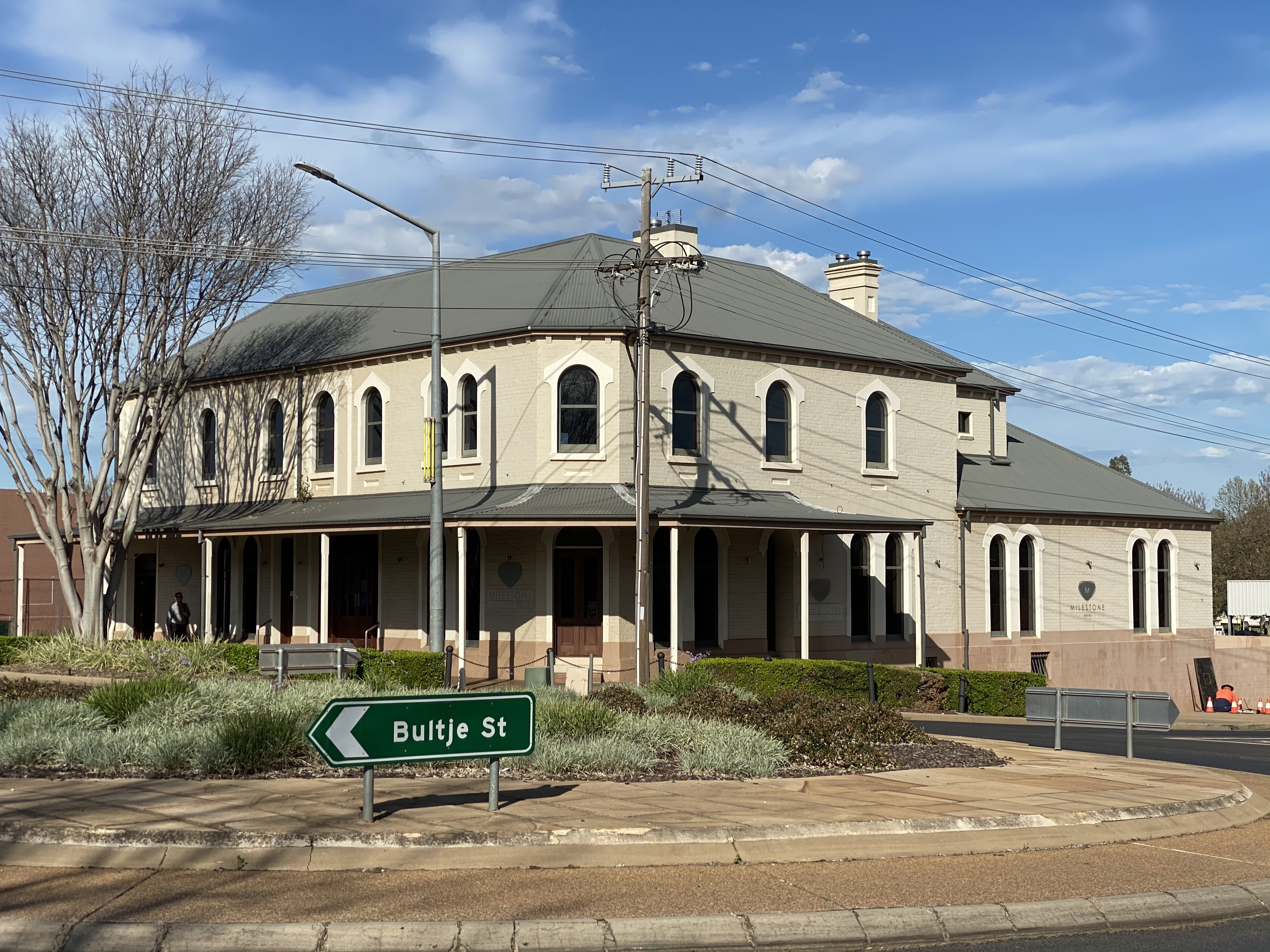
- rude as

- Location within New South Wales Location within Australia
- 32°15′04″S 148°36′01″E
- Location: 195–197 Macquarie Street, Dubbo, Dubbo Regional Council, New South Wales, Australia

History
- Built: 1882

Site notes
- Owner: Kayora Pty Ltd

New South Wales Heritage Register
- Official name: Kemwah Court; Imperial Hotel; The Bushman's Home; Milestone Hotel
- Type: State heritage (built)
- Designated: 2 April 1999
- Reference no.: 544
- Type: Inn/Tavern
- Category: Commercial

Milestone Hotel is a heritage-listed Australian pub at 195–197 Macquarie Street, Dubbo, Dubbo Regional Council, New South Wales, Australia. It was built in 1882. It is also known as the Imperial Hotel; The Bushman's Home; and Kemwah Court. The property is owned by a private entity. It was added to the New South Wales State Heritage Register on 2 April 1999.

== History ==
Built in 1882 at the south end of Macquarie Street, just when the town's northward shift began.

In 2018, the building continues in use as the Milestone Hotel.

== Description ==
The site is on the south-western corner of the intersection of Macquarie and Bultje Streets. The hotel building occupies the eastern portion of the site with a customer and staff car park to the rear. A deciduous tree is immediately outside the Macquarie Street facade near the corner.

The hotel is a freestanding one and two-storey late Victorian Italianate style hotel, made of brick, painted, with a hipped roof clad in corrugated steel. A single storey verandah roof extends over the footpath on the Macquarie Street elevation and partly along the north side on Bultje Street. Windows and doors are timber-framed and of recent construction. The building is significant as a good example of a late 19th century Victorian Italianate style hotel.

== Heritage listing ==
Kemwah Court was listed on the New South Wales State Heritage Register on 2 April 1999.
