= Yullundry, New South Wales =

Yullundry
- Town
- Coordinates: 32°50′S 148°41′E
- Country: Australia
- State: New South Wales
- LGA: Cabonne Shire

Population
  - Total: 35 (SAL 2021)
- Postcode: 2867

Yullundry is a rural locality between the towns of Yeoval and Cumnock in the Central West region of New South Wales, Australia.

== History ==
The locality once had a shop—owned by J Ryan—a school and a railway station on the now closed Molong–Dubbo railway line. None of these establishments now exist; any remnants were destroyed in a fire during the late 1970s. The Yullundry church still exists and is still attended. Yullundry Post Office opened on 1 March 1873 and was closed before the end of 1887. The Yullundry School closed in 1957 and the school building was moved to Yeoval Central School.

The population of Yullundry was 35 at the 2021 census.
