= Wongarbon =

- Town
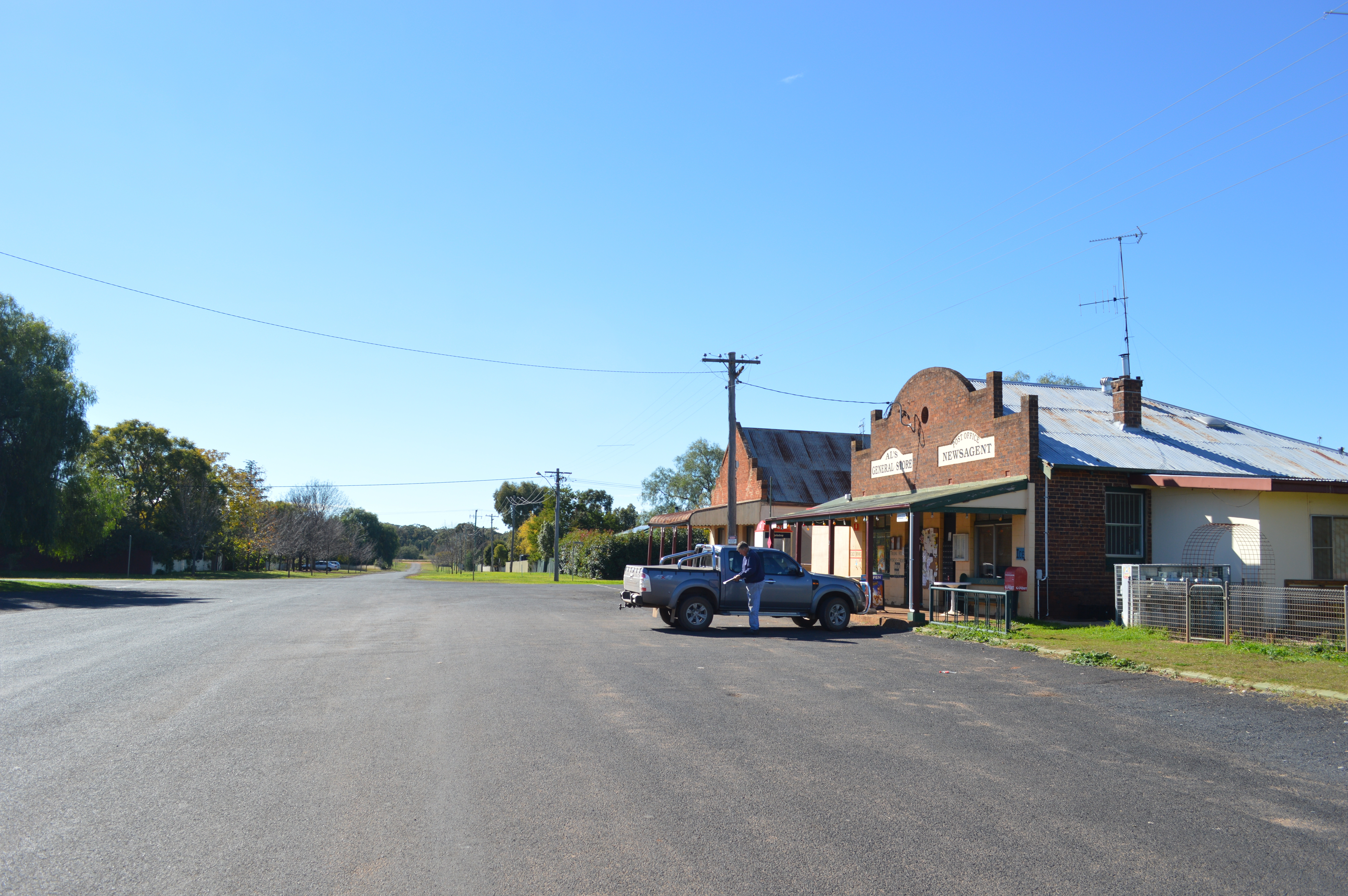
- Main street

- Coordinates: 32°20′0″S 148°46′0″E
- Country: Australia
- State: New South Wales
- LGA: Dubbo Regional Council
- Location: 381 km (237 mi) NW of Sydney; 19 km (12 mi) SE of Dubbo

Government
  - State electorate: Dubbo
  - Federal division: Parkes
- Elevation: 390 m (1,280 ft)

Population
  - Total: 766 (2016 census)
- Postcode: 2831
- County: Lincoln
- Parish: Murrumbidgerie

Wongarbon is a village approximately 18 kilometres east of Dubbo on the Mitchell Highway between Dubbo and Wellington, New South Wales, Australia. The name is also applied to the surrounding area for postal and statistical purposes. At the 2016 census, Wongarbon had a population of 766.

== History ==
The area now known as Wongarbon lies on the traditional lands of Wiradjuri people.

After settler colonisation, the area lay within the County of Lincoln, and the Parish of Murrumbidgerie. There was a large landholding known as 'Murrumbidgerie' in the area, which was a well-established sheep and cattle run by the early 1850s. By 1866, there was an inn on the road to Dubbo, known as the Murrumbidgerie Inn; there was an attempted murder there in 1873.

The former railway station predates the village, opening in February 1881. In 1883 a village site was reserved, with the land excised from a landholding named 'Murrumbidgerie', which also became the original name of the village. The village's school opened, in January 1887.

On 20 October 1888, the Village of Murrumbidgerie was proclaimed, and land was reserved for a common and for water supply purposes The latter land is the site of the dam on Eulamoga Creek, known as Wongarbon Tank, which for many years was the village's water supply.

In 1908, the name of the village was changed from Murrumbidgerie to Wongarbon, and the names of the railway station and school also changed in that year. It seems that the old name was causing confusion, perhaps with Murrumbidgee. The name 'Murrumbidgerie' is still used in connection with an area closer to the Macquarie River, south of Wongarbon and west of Geurie.

The name 'Wongarbon' may refer to Wongaibon people, whose country begins further west, around and beyond the Bogan River. If so, it is seemingly misapplied, as Wongarbon is in Wiradjuri country; the old name, 'Murrumbidgerie', is almost certainly derived from the Wiradjuri language, perhaps from the word 'Marrmabidya'. An alternative etymology is that Wongarbon is not an Aboriginal word, but the result of a landholder's suggestion of a new name for the village, and is actually 'no brag now' spelled backwards; there are at least two stories of the reason behind that derivation, which involve rivalry between two local landholders, named Bragg and Rutherford (James Rutherford, the son of prominent American-Australian pioneer and businessman, James Rutherford), and a third which relates to Bragg alone.

Following the end of the First World War, the remainder of the old 'Murrumbidgerie' landholding, near to the village, was broken up, under the policy of closer settlement, as soldier settler blocks. Wheat growing became important in the area, and the village's railway siding was used to dispatch the crop by train.

The village had a Uniting (formerly Methodist) church, now a privately owned building. The former Catholic church exists, in an abandoned state, in Boberah Street.

The Wongarbon Nature Reserve is an area to the north of the village that was set aside in 1897, as 'temporary' common land for the village's use. The area became a remnant of less disturbed native habitat, as the surrounding area was cleared for agriculture, and a refuge for threatened species. In 2022, it was placed under the management of the local Aboriginal group, Pathways Together.

At the 2006 census, Wongarbon had a population of 449.

== Amenities ==
The village has a three-teacher primary school, convenience store/post office and a pub, 'The Ploughman's Rest'.

It no longer has a railway station, but has bus services to Dubbo. The nearest railway stations are at Dubbo and Geurie, which are served by a daily train service. There is a grain siding on the Main Western railway line, which has storage sheds and a grain-loader for trains.

There is a cemetery approximately 3 km from the village.

Due to its proximity to Dubbo, the village is expanding.
