= Mitchell Creek =

Mitchell Creek may refer to:

- Mitchell Creek (Tunitas Creek), a stream in California
- Mitchell Creek (South Dakota), a stream in South Dakota
- Mitch Creek, professional basketball player

See also, Mitchells Creek:

- Mitchells Creek, a watercourse in Central West, New South Wales, Australia
- Mitchells Creek, a second watercourse in New South Wales, Australia, near Sunny Corner
- Mitchells Creek, a third watercourse in New South Wales, Australia, in the Megalong Valley
