= Bodangora, New South Wales =

Locality and village in New South Wales

Bodangora
- Town
- Coordinates: 32°27′01.2″S 148°59′56.3″E
- Country: Australia
- State: New South Wales
- Region: Central West
- LGA: Dubbo Regional Council
- Location: 343 km (213 mi) NW of Sydney; 13.6 km (8.5 mi) NNE of Wellington; 52 km (32 mi) SE of Dubbo

Government
  - State electorate: Dubbo
  - Federal division: Calare
- Elevation: 459 m (1,506 ft)

Population
  - Total: 74 (2021 census)
- Postcode: 2820
- County: Lincoln, Bligh
Localities around Bodangora
Geurie	Comobella	Spicers Creek
Maryvale	Bodangora	Spicers Creek
Wellington	Wuuluman	Wuuluman

Bodangora is a locality in the Central West region of New South Wales, Australia, lying to the immediate north-north-east of Wellington. The locality is predominantly agricultural, but in past times was associated with gold and copper mining. There was a village of the same name, which no longer officially exists and is now virtually a ghost town; it had two earlier names, Mitchells Creek and Daviesville. The locality once also contained three other small villages, Lincoln and two mining villages, Jawbone and Kaiser, or 'Kaiser Crossing'; all three of these villages are now ghost towns.

== History ==
=== Aboriginal and early settler history ===
The area now known as Bodangora lies on the traditional lands of Wiradjuri people.

John Oxley and his expedition passed the future site of Wellington in 1817, when following the Macquarie River. Wellington became a convict agricultural settlement in 1823. Jacob Levi Montefiore (1819 – 1885) was given a land grant in the area and made other land acquisitions; part of that land is now within the locality of Bodangora.

=== Early mining ===
==== Early find ====
In 1843, a shepherd, Hugh McGregor had taken around £200 worth of gold from around a quartz reef outcrop, in the locality now known as Bodangora, then called Mitchells Creek, and had quietly sold it to jewellers in Sydney. The find predated the first New South Wales gold rush of 1851. Edward Hammond Hargreaves, who later was rewarded for discovering gold in New South Wales, knew of that earlier find, and was planning to pursue the source of the gold near Wellington, when he diverted his attention to the area near Ophir.

==== Alluvial gold mining ====
Very soon after the rush to Ophir, gold had been found on Mitchell's Creek, in early June 1851.

In the late 1860s alluvial gold was found at Jawbone, on the road between Wellington and the site of the later village at Bodongara. There was a minor rush to the field. The discovery of gold at Gulgong led to most miners deserting the field.

=== Mitchells Creek Mine ===
The main mine within the locality now known as Bodangora was the Mitchell's Creek Mine. It was a quartz reef gold mine. It was only in 1869, that the Michells Creek Mine began to work a quartz reef, although it was close to where McGregor had found his gold in the 1840s.

==== Early years (1869 – c.1880) ====
The mine site lay on freehold land, comprising some contiguous portions of land that were owned by Samuel Deane Gordon (1811–1882) or jointly owned by him and Jacob Levi Montefiore. In early land titles in New South Wales, mineral rights were a part of the freehold. The Prospectus of a new company, 'Mitchell's Creek Quartz And Gold Mining Company'—capital of 30,000 in 6,000 shares—was issued in late 1869. 3,000 shares were to be offered to the public. 3,000 fully-paid shares were to be issued to the proprietors, Gordon and Montefiore, who were both on the new company's board.

The company was eventually formed as The Mitchell's Creek Mining Company, in 1870. Sinking of the shaft took longer than expected and, although the crushing plant had been completed, crushing had still not commenced by July 1871. A report, from October 1872, describes three 5-head stamper mills with amalgam plates, with the material then passing through a buddle to capture gold bearing pyrite. There were plans to erect a roasting furnace and Chilean mill to treat the pyrite ore. Water for the gold recovery processes was pumped from Mitchell's Creek.

Despite a significant investment being made, and the deposit being of significant size, the venture did not prosper. In 1874, creditors sued the company and obtained an sheriff's order to put the assets of the company—mine, land and equipment—to a public auction to be held on 16 April 1874. In July 1874, Gordon and Montefiore made what was left of the company insolvent.

A report by W.H.J (John) Slee, Inspector of Mines, in 1877, noted that the mine was being worked by tribute miners, and that pyrite ores were being accumulated, using buddles, for future treatment. The mine was still being worked in February 1880, when a miner Thomas Ingall was killed there in a rockfall.

==== Interregnum (c.1881 – 1888) ====
The mine remained idle for some years. Extracting gold profitably from the sulphide zone ore in the mine had proved too difficult. As gold extraction technology developed during the 1880s and 1890s, the mine presented an opportunity for those who could invest in means of successfully treating the sulphide gold ore and expanding it.

==== Operation as a large mine (1889 – 1908) ====
Four partners—James Dick (1823 – 1902), a Scottish gutta-percha manufacturer and mining investor, James. M. Findlay, Thomas. M. Dalveen, and Phillip Davies, a mining expert, who put together the syndicate and who was their general manager—put in £16,000 each. They bought the mine in the latter part of 1888, commenced operations in June 1889, sinking the No.1 shaft and installing new equipment. They continued to operate as a partnership, Mitchell's Creek Freehold Gold Estate, rather than setting up a company.

In 1890, Slee reported favourably on the mine and its new management, stating, "I am not aware of any quartz vein in New South Wales which can be traced with such regularity as to thickness and length."

Initially, the pyrite gold ores were sold to Clyde Chlorination Works. In late 1894, a gold chlorination plant was commissioned allowing treatment on site of pyrite gold ores from deeper levels of the mine. Prior to the chlorination process being applied, 40% of the gold in the pyrite ores had been lost and, reportedly, it was the sale of old tailings for reprocessing that allowed the mine to be profitable, virtually as soon as it had reopened in 1889.

In 1893, an agreement was made with Australian Gold Recovery Company to recover gold from old tailings heaps. They planned to apply the then relatively new McArthur-Forrest cyanide process, under the direction of metallurgist Peter McIntyre, who was one of the Forrest Brothers' assistants. The cyanide process largely superseded the chlorination process.

By 1895 there were two shafts on the main Mitchells Creek lode. There was a third temporary working known as 'Snow's shaft'. In late 1895, Slee reported again, noting the increase in stamper mill capacity from 15 heads—installed in 1890—to 25 heads, and that the mine was "being worked on sound commercial principles". By that time, Findlay was general manager; Davies had sold his share to Dick, and was no longer involved from around 1895. Findlay died in 1897. James Dick later became the sole owner, when he bought out Dalveen, in 1900.

In 1901, the mine commissioned a new 40-head stamper battery, near the No.2 shaft, and ore from both shafts was conveyed there on a tram line. By September 1902, the expansion of the Mitchells Creek Mine was completed. A new poppet head, winding engine, and electric lighting had been installed. There was a third permanent shaft on Dick's Reward reef, 600 to 700 yards north-west from the Mitchells Creek main shaft.

In March 1902, the sole owner, James Dick, had died. He left an estate valued at £1,077,000. Although the Mitchell's Creek Mine was a large mine, it was a relatively small part of Dick's Australian mining holdings. He held large stakes in mines at Broken Hill and Mount Morgan Mount Lyell and Gympie. Dick had no children and his wife had predeceased him. Upon his death, most of his immense fortune was bequeathed to charitable institutions and former employees, and therefore the individual mining assets needed to be sold.

In August 1902, reportedly, the mine was under offer in London, for £200,000. It was noted that this was a far greater sum—even after allowing for recent improvements—than had been determined by arbitration in 1900, when the partnership had been ended. The eventual sale agreed by Dick's estate was for £60,000—£20,000 in cash followed by a series of equal periodic instalments. The new venture took over the operation of the mine, but failed to make the first instalment payment, and asked for more time to make the payment. The Dick estate put the venture into receivership, pending payment, but the sale was never completed, leaving ownership with Dick's estate.

At the end of 1903, a new company, Mitchell's Creek Gold Mine Limited, was formed to take over the mine from Mitchell's Creek Freehold Gold Estate. The new owners took control in May 1904. It seems that the purchase was not funded by a capital raising, but by the issue of mortgage debentures. The first interest payment on the debentures was missed. One of the debenture holders, Sir John Neilson Cuthbertson (1829—1905)—representing a holding of 40 debentures of £1,000 each—went to court in England, around April 1905, to find precisely what mortgage security could be accessed. Cuthbertson was a deputy lieutenant of Glasgow. As Cuthbertson had died in January 1905, it was probably either his estate or interests that he was representing that was seeking repayment of the debentures. There was a mortgagee auction in August 1906. However, there seems to have been no sale, because the mortgagees eventually foreclosed on the mine property, in March 1907, seeking to recover a sum of £50,089 10s. 9d. and the interest upon it from 26 January 1907.

During the early months of 1908, it was reported that a large cyanide plant was being installed at the mine.

Mitchell's Creek mine around end 1907

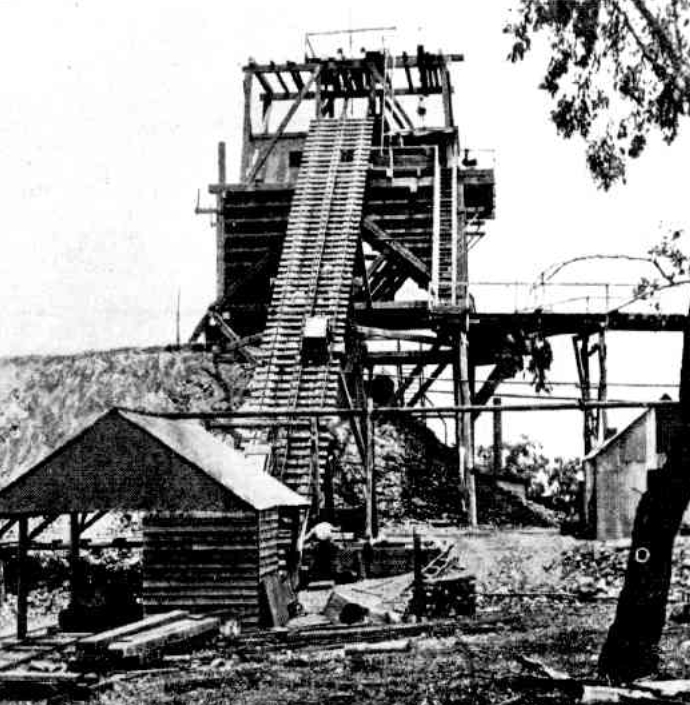
Poppet head

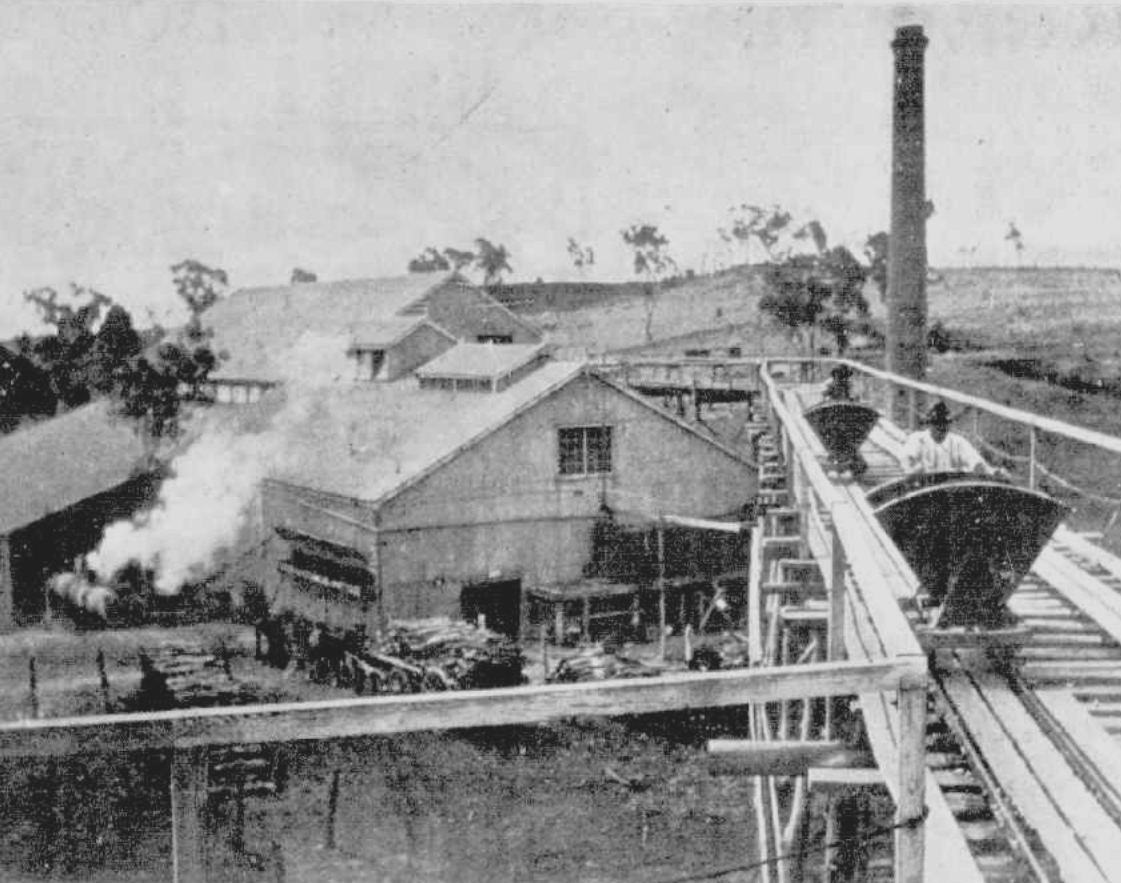
Stamper battery from poppet head

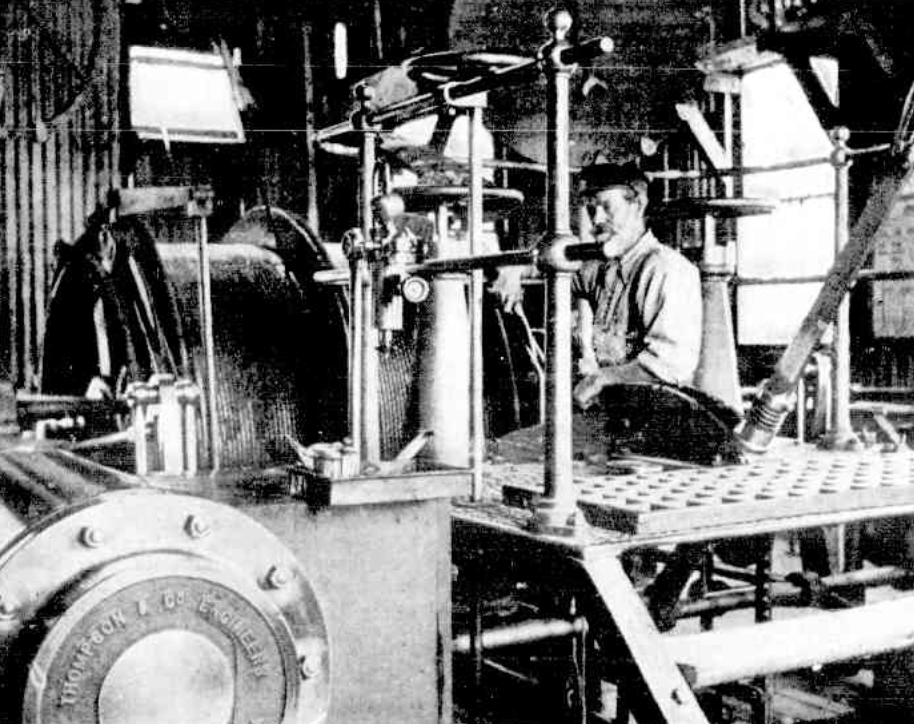
Mine winder and driver

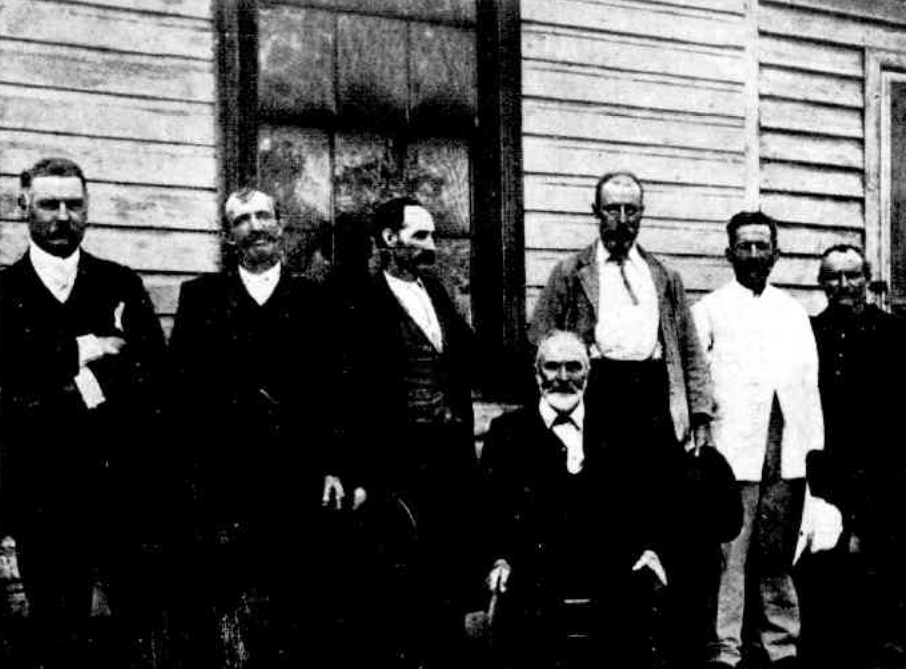
Officials of Mitchell's Ck and Dick mines

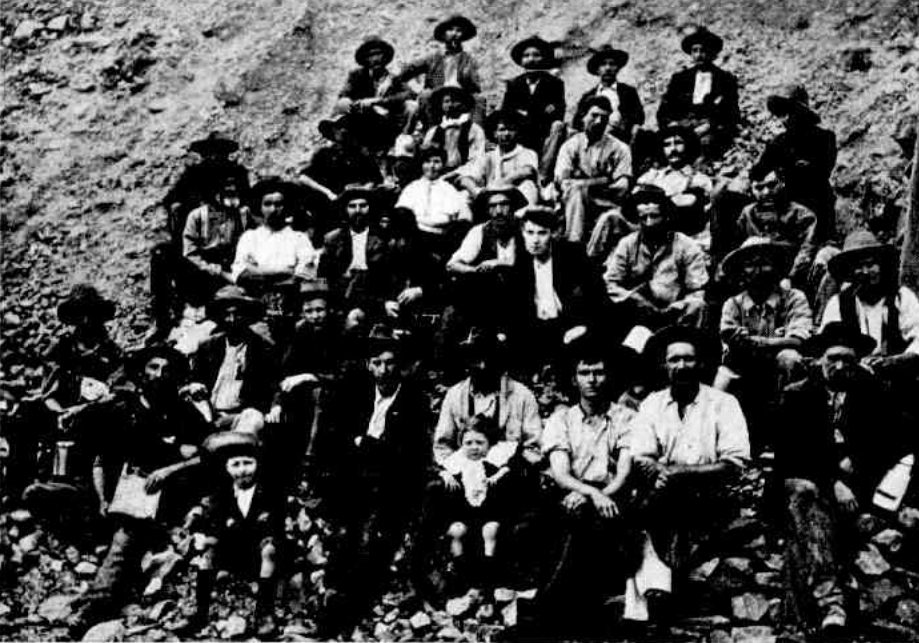
Surface hands (Mitchell's Ck)

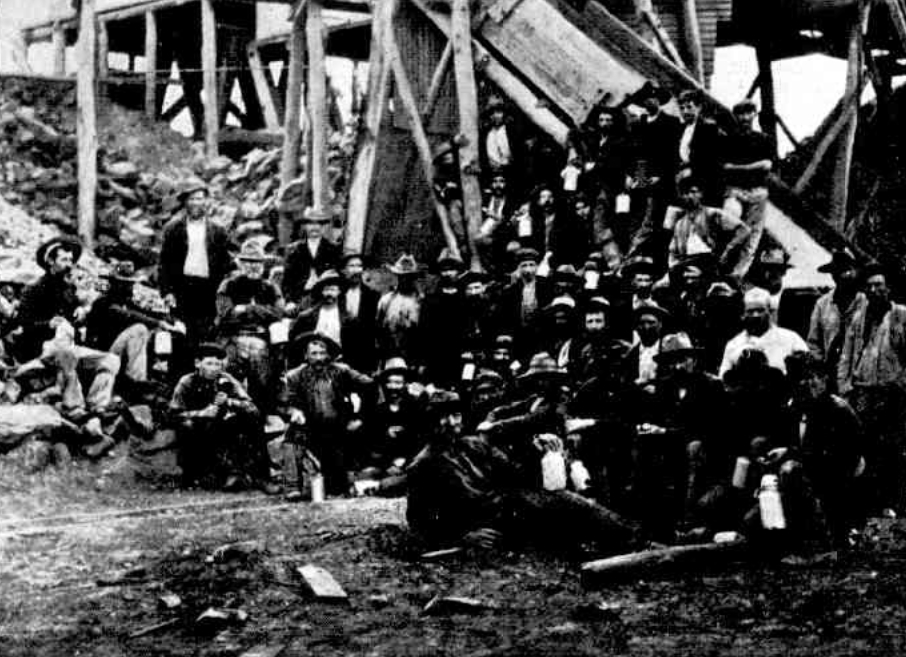
Morning shift, Dick's mine

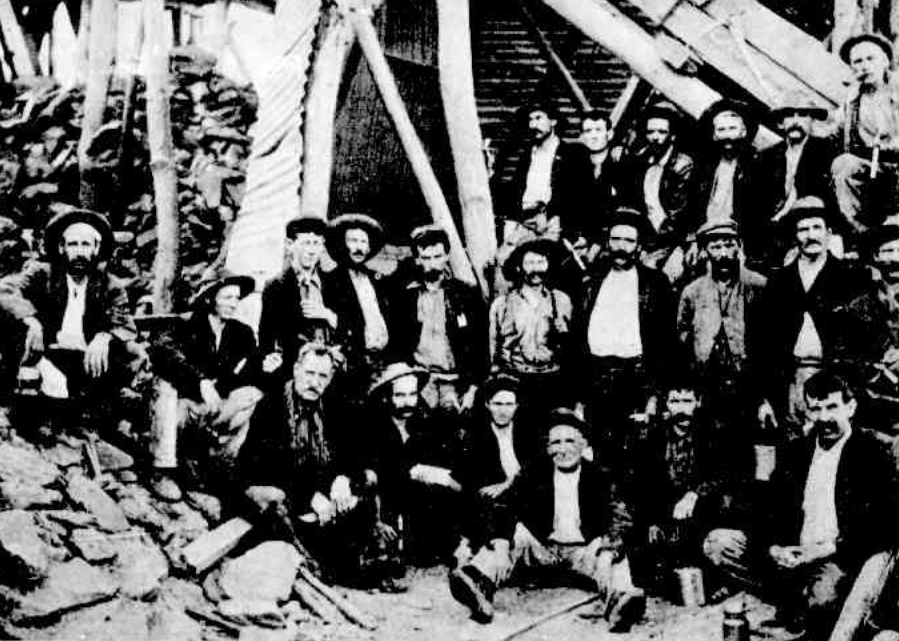
Afternoon shift, Dick's mine

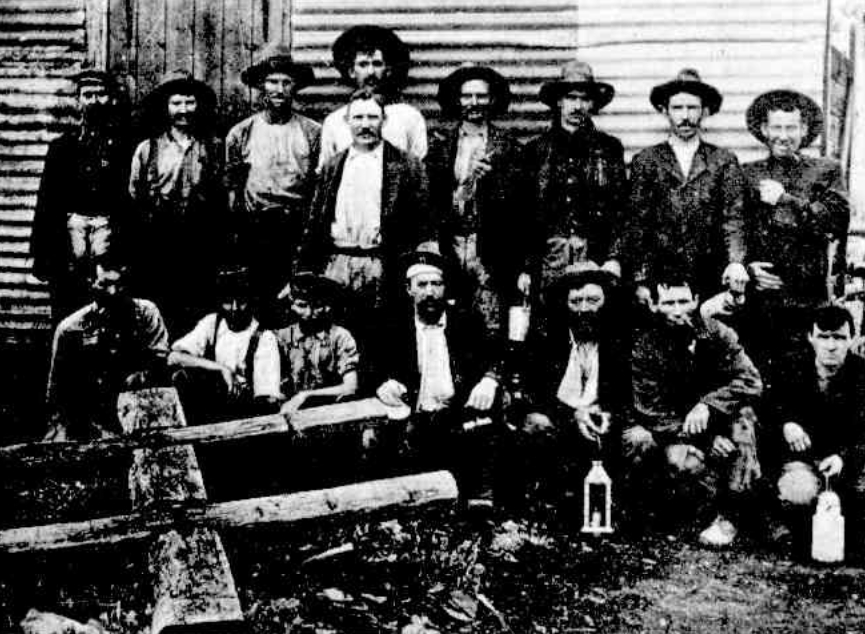
Night shift, Dick's mine

==== Reduced operations and final closing (1908 - 1919) ====
In May 1908, the mine closed, putting around 200 men out of work. The main mine had become unprofitable to operate, and the 'Dick's Reward' deposit was stated to be "petering out". Reprocessing of 150,000 tons of tailings was the only ongoing operation, employing only around 30 men at the cyanide plant. In 1910, cyaniding operations continued under the Mitchell's Creek Gold Recovery Company. In October 1910, a new company, Bodangora Gold Mines, No Liability, planned to work the neighbouring 'Dick's Reward' gold deposit. In 1913, the Mitchells Creek mine was once again in operation, with 26 of its miners working the mine as tribute miners. Sources date the final end of mining at the Mitchell's Creek Mine to either 1918 or 1919.

==== Accidents ====
For its time, the size of its workforce, and that, at times, it operated three mining shifts, the mine seems to have been a relatively safe one in which to work. There were three reported fatalities—in February 1880, in October 1897, and one at another date—and there were some serious injuries to mine workers. However, there were significantly less accidents than at comparable large gold mines, such the mine at Canbelego. One reason given for the relatively low accident rate was that the mine was well timbered, and there were fewer rockfalls as a consequence. Only two of the reported mine accidents were due to rockfalls, and the only such fatal incident took place in 1880, before Mitchell's Creek Freehold Gold Estate took over the mine.

=== Later alluvial mining ===
In October 1899, a man sinking a well struck a deep lead of gold wash five feet thick, at a depth of 60 feet, in the old Jawbone alluvial mining area. Within a week, reportedly, there were around 100 miners working there, and around 500 miners working there by February 1900. The Jawbone deposit was still producing gold in 1907, when about 30 men were reported to be earning a living there, but records of gold production at Jawbone cease in 1911.

=== Earlier settlements ===
==== Lincoln ====
Lincoln was a settlement that arose on the main road between Wellington and Gulgong at the crossing of Mitchell's Creek. The settlement arose in the late 1860s, when Ernest Hoffmeister, a German-born gold miner from Victoria, built a residence, on the western side of the crossing, and began successfully farming a selection of 80 acres. Other selectors encouraged by Hoffmeister's success took up land in the area. The crossing became a favoured camping site of those travelling between the gold fields in the region.

By September 1871, Hoffmeister had converted his residence into an inn, the Michell's Creek Hotel. By 1876, there was also a store and post office there, and in 1908 a blacksmith's shop opened. Hoffmeister sold the hotel, by then known at the Redbank Hotel, to William Robinson, In 1891. Hoffmeister died, after a long illness, while awaiting an operation for a tumour, in 1892.

By 1903, the hotel was reported to be in a dilapidated state. In 1904, William Robinson—the next licensee of what was, by then known as the Lincoln Hotel—died, reportedly having never fully recovered from the death of his wife two years earlier. The licence was only renewed, in October 1904, based an assurance that a new building would be erected. It seems that no new building was erected.

In July 1907, the next licensee, Robinson's son, William John Robinson, died from what was reported initially to be a suicide but which a later inquest found to have been an accidental shooting. The hotel closed in 1909, and its remains were demolished in 1936.

A post office existed at Lincoln, until 1959, when the last postmistress—also a member of the Robinson family—died, effectively bringing the settlement to an end. The ruin of the post office was still in existence in 2006.

==== Jawbone ====
Jawbone was a settlement associated with alluvial gold mining. It had a hotel, known as the Waterloo Hotel.

==== Kaiser or Kaiser Crossing ====
Kaiser, or Kaiser Crossing, was a settlement associated with the Kaiser mine, which was worked primarily for copper but also held some gold. The mine did not have a source of water with which to process its ore, and established its crusher on the northern bank of Mitchell's Creek. A settlement sprang up there, with houses, a hotel, school, butcher, baker, store, and a Catholic church and convent. Removal of the crusher led to the decline of the village, and it had disappeared completely by 1919.

=== Village of Bodangora ===
==== Growth ====
After mining was resumed by Mitchell's Creek Freehold Gold Estate, in mid 1889, a settlement sprang up near the mine. By the end of 1895, the village had a population of around 400. Initially known as Mitchell's Creek, later for a time—1892 to 1896—the settlement was known as Daviesville, and finally Bodangora. It was officially proclaimed as the Village of Bodangora on 6 November 1897. The village site lies partially inside the Parish of Bodangora (County of Lincoln) and the Parish of Nanima (County of Bligh).

Mitchells Creek is the name of a watercourse that passes to the north of the village's site, but was also the name of another mining settlement, now known as Sunny Corner. Two of the four men involved in the mining venture, were Phillip Davies—after whom Daviesville was named—and James Dick—of Glasgow, Scotland, one of partners in the mine—who gave his name to Dick Street, one of the streets of the village. The name Bodgangora had been used previously as the name of the cadestral parish, a nearby mountain, Mount Bodangora, and a property in the area. The common land of the village remained known as the Daviesville Common.

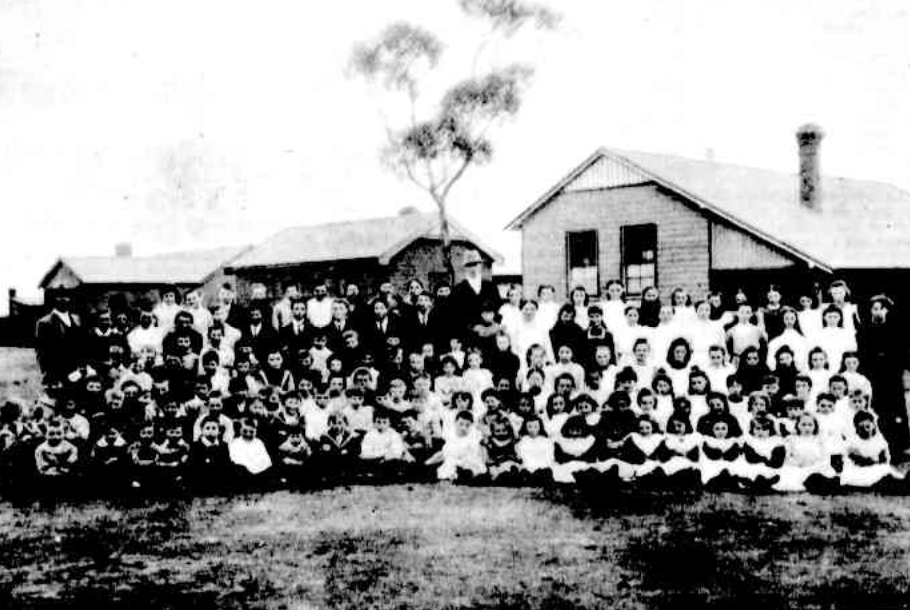
Daviesville Public School (1904)

The settlement had a public school from August 1892. Initially called Mitchells Creek, its name became Daviesville in March 1893, before changing again, to Bodangora, in November 1906. The village also had a post office, which changed its name from Daviesville to Bodangora in 1897. It used the numeric code 1703. By 1896, the settlement had a police station. In August 1897, the main street was "being cleared of stumps and other impediments to traffic", and the village did not have a proper water supply,

Exacerbated by reliance upon rainwater tanks for its water, the village suffered a catastrophic fire, in November 1899, which destroyed three buildings; a store, a fruiterer's shop, and a private dwelling. At the time, the village had about twenty businesses and three churches; Church of England, Baptist, and Presbyterian. There eventually would also be Catholic and Wesleyan churches.

The village had no hotel in 1899. Opposed by the mine's management, an application for a licence was refused. However, the Tattersall's Hotel at Bodangora was in business by the end of 1900. At the same date, the village had two butchers' shops, a bakery and confectionary shop, a boot shop, a shop selling horehound beer, and at least four stores, T. McDonnell's store, H.Levy's General Store, the Jubilee Store and the Post Office Store. There were also "several fruit and soft drink shops". There was a daily coach service to Wellington.

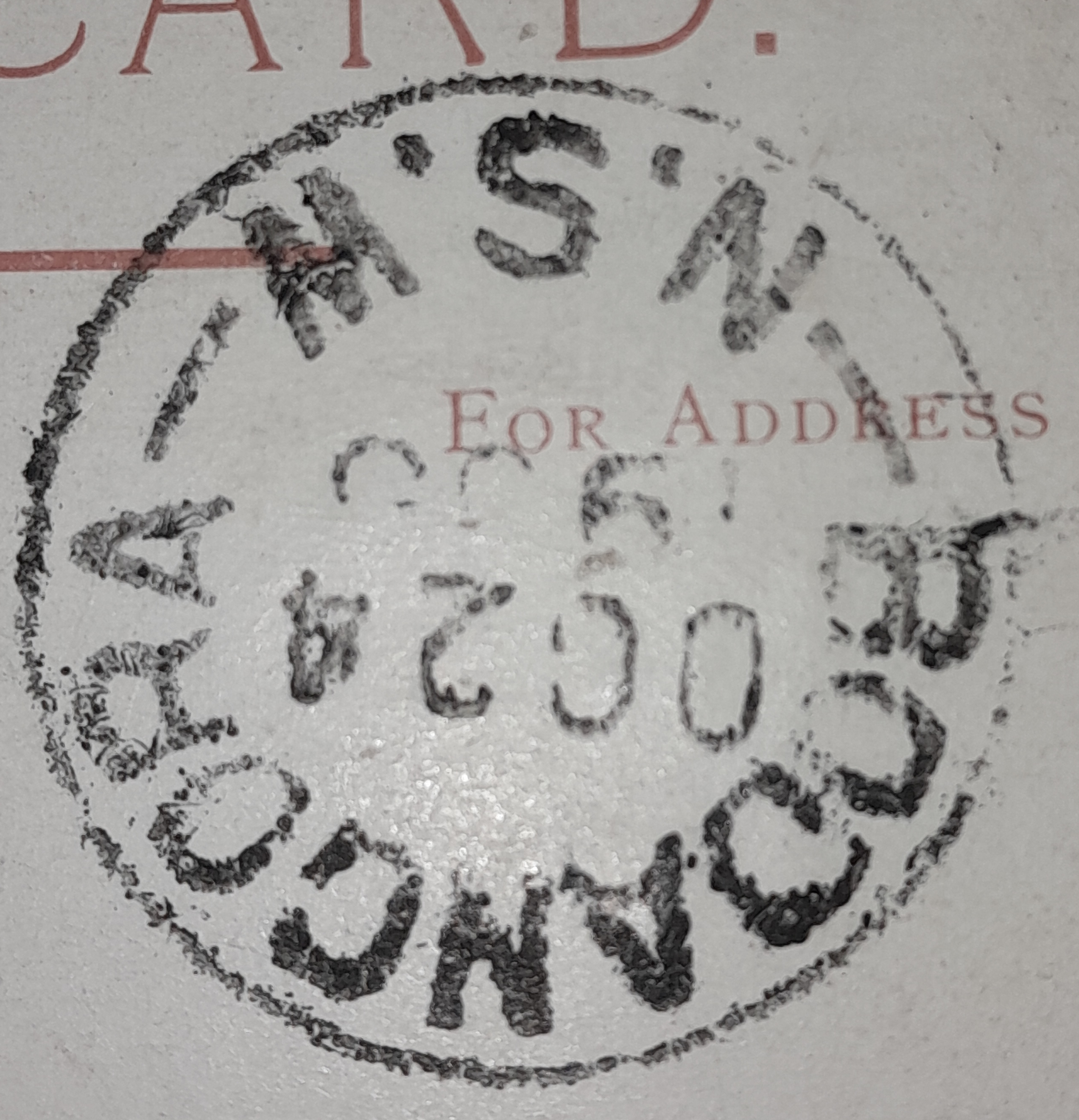
Postmark

In 1902, the Mitchells Creek Mine was expanded, and more men were employed there. In 1902, the village's Baptist church was opened. The village's new post office building was officially opened on 31 March 1905. The village reached its greatest extent around 1907. The population was around 1,000.

Kaiser and Daviesville coexisted for a while, but the newer and larger settlement, away from the floodprone creek, eventually led to the abandonment of Kaiser. The Catholic church of St Joseph and its convent school relocated from the settlement of Kaiser to the new village in 1905-1906.

==== Storm damage ====
At 7:45 pm, on Monday, 4 March 1907, the village was hit by a "cyclonic storm", which damaged almost every building in the village to some extent. The building of the Church of England was destroyed, and the Methodist and Baptist churches were damaged. Another of the badly damaged buildings was the newly-relocated Catholic church; beyond repair, a new Catholic church, St Paul's, was later constructed of stone. The convent building escaped damage, but many buildings in the village lost their roofs. The only injury was to a horse hit by roofing iron. Flooding also caused damage. The post office was flooded.

Some of the buildings damaged by the 'cyclonic storm' of 4 March 1907

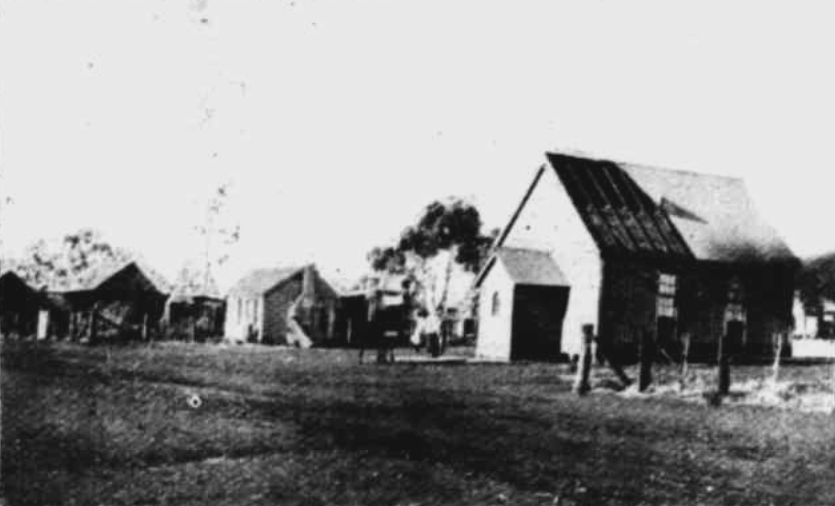
Methodist church with damaged roof

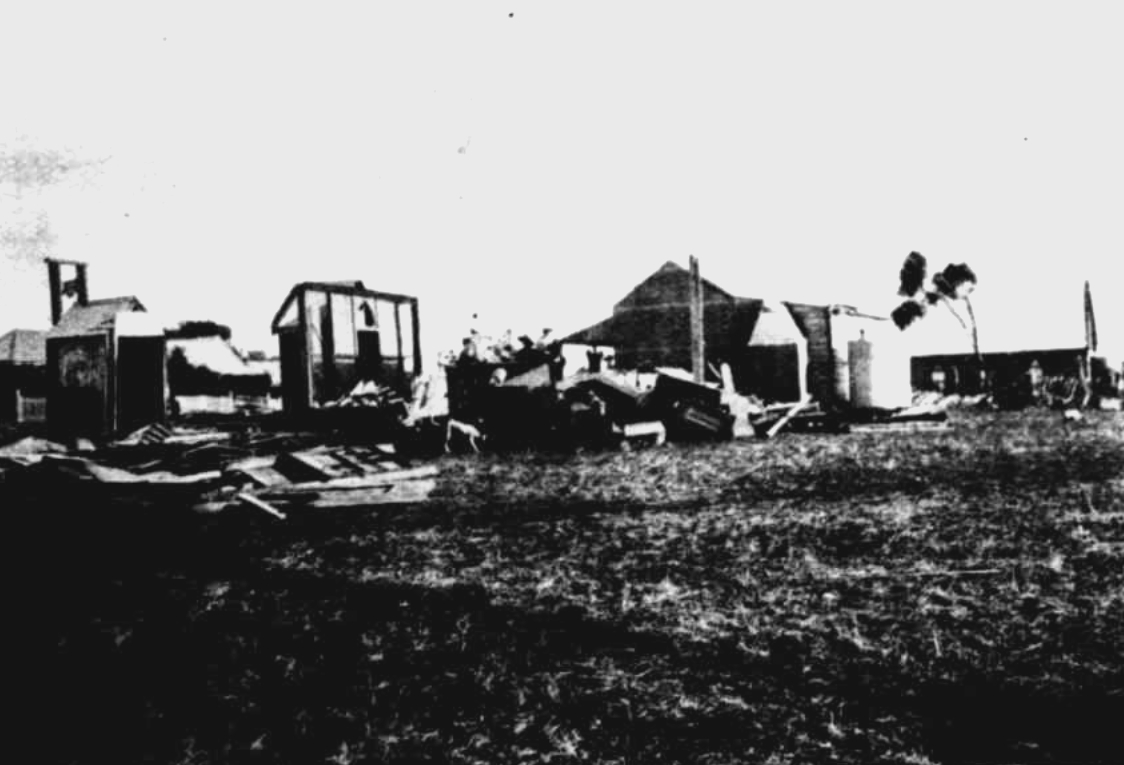
Left-to-right: Church of England, schoolhouse, and Baptist church

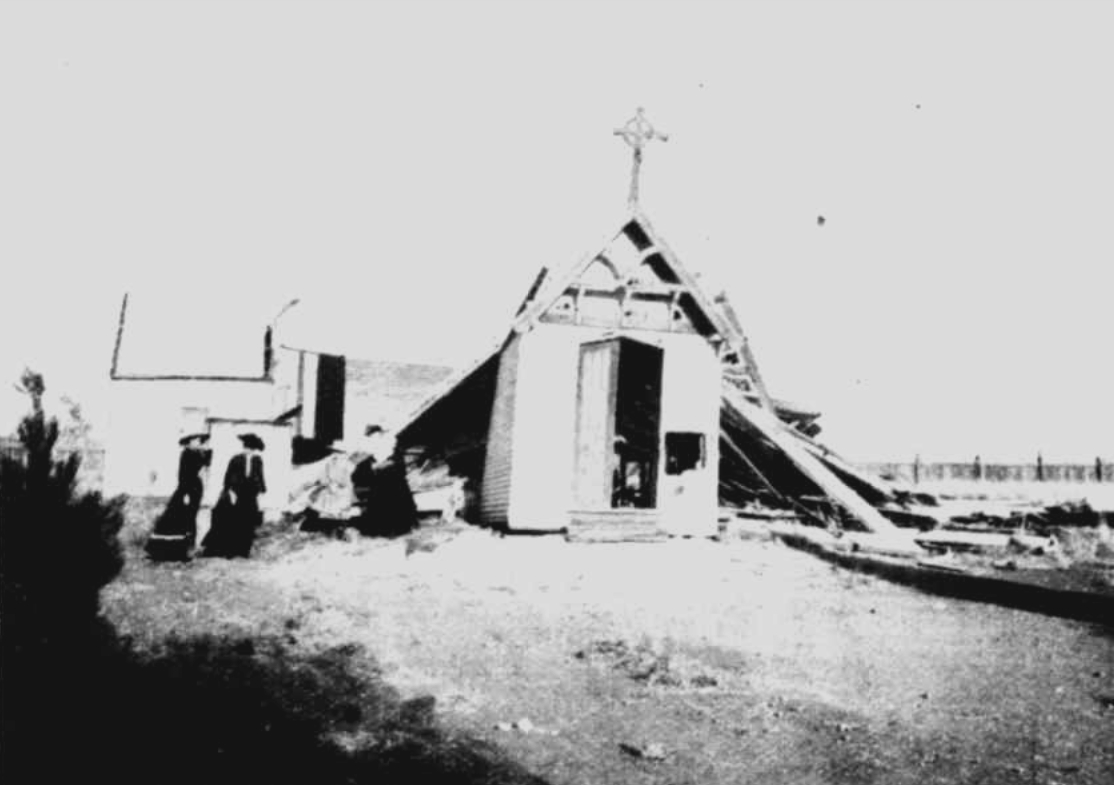
Catholic church that had been relocated from Kaiser, and was then destroyed in the storm.

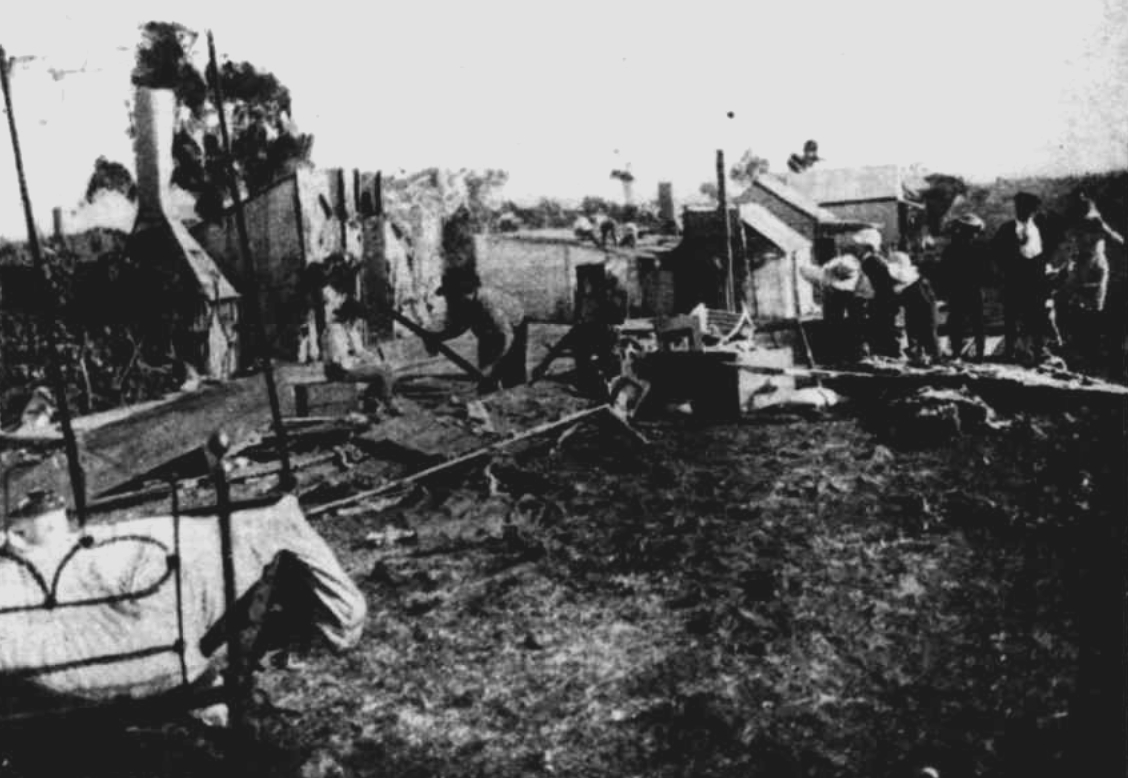
Seymour and Carter's home. Five people survived here by getting into a chimney.

==== Decline ====
In May 1908, there was a crisis, when the mine closed, putting around 200 men out of work. Retreatment of tailings was the only ongoing operation, employing only around 30 men at the cyanide plant. It was expected that the village's population would fall from 1,000 to around 100, and business people were selling off their stock in anticipation of relocating to other places. By September 1908, the village's population was in decline, and it was envisaged that "if the present rate is kept up in a short time there will only be some twenty or thirty houses left on the place." The new Catholic Church officially opened on 9 May 1909.

Gold mining continued sporadically, with mines being worked on tribute, in 1913, but the effect of the First World War further reduced mining activity, and it had ceased by 1919. Some of the remaining residents left the village in that year. In May 1920, two weatherboard cottages and five large sheds were put up for auction. The 'Mine House'—a house where visiting directors and other guests had stayed—was demolished and relocated in July 1921.

Bodangora sent 47 men to the First World War, of whom 16 died. Some of the Coo-ee march recruits of 1915 came from Bodangora. A memorial to those who served and those who died in the First World War, was unveiled by Sir Walter Davidson, in September 1921.

=== After mining ===
The mining company auctioned off its assets, in February 1923, ending hopes of a resumption of mining. Following the sale, the decline of the village intensified. Although surrounded by good agricultural land, proximity to Wellington ensured that agriculture alone would not sustain the village as it had been.

Buildings in the village were being demolished and relocated during 1923, including the mine manager's house. The hotel closed at the end of September 1923, following the cancelling of its licence, and was just a pile of stones by mid 1925; its closing was a major blow to the village. The convent school closed in 1925. During 1928, the Baptist church building was relocated to Wellington, where it was used for a Sunday school hall.

In mid 1932, the police station was closed, and the village was thereafter without a police presence. In 1936, some of the streets of the village were closed. Some tailings were being reprocessed, between 1931 and 1940, but this activity provided little employment compared to the days of hard-rock mining.

The locality was to have been on the Maryvale to Sandy Hollow railway line—something viewed as a potential lifeline for the village—but lay on the 72 km long corridor, between Maryvale and Gulgong; work started on that section, but was never completed. There was to have been a railway station called Drill Creek within the locality.

The village still had a significant number of inhabited houses into the 1950s and 1960s. In 1958, the Methodist church building was moved to Geurie, where it became a church hall. The Catholic church remained in regular use until 1964, but thereafter was used only sporadically. The school closed in April 1970. The Village of Bodangora ceased to exist, officially, after 1976, becoming a locality, Bodangora. Bodangora's population was only around 30 in 1986. The current boundaries of the locality of Bodangora, for postal purposes, were assigned in March 2000.

=== Later gold production ===
Attempts at reprocessing mine tailings to recover gold occurred, between 1931 and 1940 and in the early 1970s. The shaft of the mine was still accessible in 1972. An old stamper mill that stood at the mine site was sold, in 1973, and relocated for display with other mining relics at O'Brien's Hill, Grenfell.

Gold production resumed, when Cluff Minerals (Australia) Pty Ltd began reprocessing 241,000 tonnes of tailings—average gold grade 1.88 g/t—from the old Mitchells Creek Mine, with the first gold poured in mid 1986. It had only a small impact on the much diminished village, although four employees resided there while it operated. Operations subsequently ceased, but the locality remains a target of minerals exploration activity.

=== Heritage Items ===
Although not much of it remained by then, the 'Former Bodangora Gold Mine', on the western side of Dick Street, was made a heritage item, in 1987, as was the unfinished railway.

== Present day Bodangora ==
Bodangora is a quiet rural locality. The Village of Bodangora no longer exists officially. Most of the old village's streets remain, but there are few buildings there. One stone church, St Paul's, still stands, but has been sold for other uses. There is a memorial to those who served and those who died in the First World War. The old cemetery lies to the west of the village, having been redesignated as a public park.

West of the village, there is a brick chimney and some remnants of foundations, from the Mitchell's Creek Mine, still standing near where the mine and treatment plant once stood. In the southern part of the old mine site, the outlines of the tailings dumps that were reprocessed in the 1980s are discernible in aerial views. Further west, to the immediate south-west of the cemetery, lies an abandoned quarry site that was previously used by Wellington Council.

The formation of the never-completed railway line can still be seen, in the northern part of the locality. Its route passes close to Bodangora Wind Farm. The locality is the location of Bodangora Airport, the airport / landing strip for the area around Wellington. The airport is also the location of the fire station used by the Bodangora brigade of the Rural Fire Service.

Nothing remains of the earlier settlements of Kaiser, Jawbone, and Lincoln.

== See also ==
- Mitchells Creek
- Bodangora Wind Farm
