= Geurie railway station =

Railway station in New South Wales, Australia

Geurie

General information
- Location: Mitchell Highway, Geurie; Australia
- Coordinates: 32°23′54″S 148°49′50″E
- Owner: Transport Asset Manager of New South Wales
- Operator: NSW TrainLink
- Line: Main Western
- Distance: 434.50 kilometres (269.99 mi) from Central
- Platforms: 1
- Tracks: 2

Construction
- Structure type: Ground
- Accessible: Yes

Other information
- Station code: GUI

History
- Opened: 1885
- Former names: Ponto (1885–1889)

Services
Preceding station	NSW TrainLink	Following station
Dubbo Terminus	NSW TrainLink Western Line Dubbo XPT	Wellington towards Sydney
Location

Geurie railway station is located on the Main Western line in New South Wales, Australia. It serves the village of Geurie, opening in 1885 as Ponto. It was renamed Geurie on 1 January 1889.

== Services ==
Geurie is served by NSW TrainLink's daily Central West XPT service operating between Sydney and Dubbo.

Platform	Line	Stopping pattern	Notes
1	Western Region	services to Central & Dubbo	

== See also ==
Geurie crossing loop collision
