= Mitchells Creek =

Creek in New South Wales, Australia

Coordinates: 33.15°S 147.31667°E

Mitchells Creek is a creek in central New South Wales, Australia. Rising north-east of Wellington, New South Wales, Mitchells Creek flows generally northward and joins the Talbragar River about 5 km south-west of Ballimore. The direct distance from its source to its outlet is 31 kilometres, longer via the twists and turns of the watercourse.

There is usually no water in the creek. The broad valley through which the creek runs is used for growing wheat. The non-existent localities of Comobella, Windorah and Westella lie within the valley, which has no extant towns or villages. The Golden Highway crosses Mitchell's Creek immediately adjacent to where it merges into the Talbragar River.

== Goldfield ==
Mitchells Creek Goldfield is claimed to be Australia's first goldfield. It is located at Bodangora near Wellington, New South Wales.

Gold was apparently first found in this area by a shepherd called McGregor in Mitchells Creek on the Montefiore's squatting run, Nanima in 1848 (about four years before the “official” discovery of gold in Australia). Newspaper reports of early prospecting are a bit confusing as another Mitchells Creek (now called Sunny Corner) was also a goldfield and was located 80 miles (130 km) to the south–east. The Bathurst Free Press noted on 25 May 1850, “Neither is there' any doubt in the fact that Mr. M'Gregor found a considerable quantity of the precious metal some years ago, near Mitchell's Creek, and it is surmised he 'still, gets more in the same locality", which pre-dates the extravagant claims of Edward Hargraves to be the first discover of gold in Australia. One published source identifies the shepherd as "Hugh McGregor" 1994. He appears in the press of the day variously as M'Gregor, McGregor and Macgregor.

The mining appears to have occurred in several phases:

== Alluvial Mining in the 1850s ==
Alluvial mining is only documented by the occasional newspaper reports.

== Quartz Mining from the 1860s ==
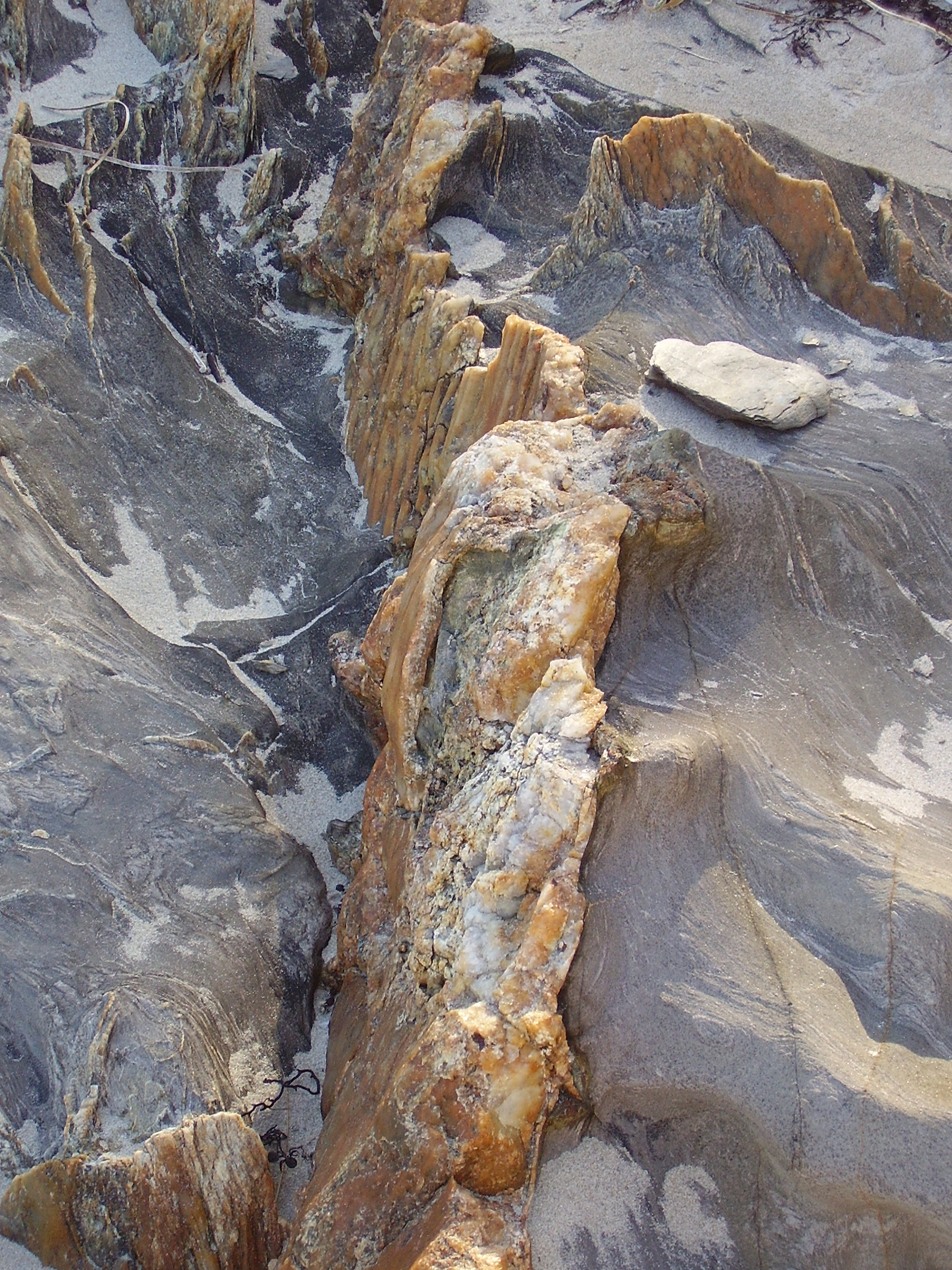
A quartz vein, prominent from the surrounding weathered rock

Quartz mining was primarily undertaken by the Mitchells Creek Gold Mining Company which seems to have had a number of owners and gone through several phases of activity. A newspaper report on the mine published in August 1892 commented "When I first visited it, 18 or 19 years ago, it was being worked under the management of Mr Fitte, and was yielding fair returns of gold. I remember it then as a splendid body of quartz, traceable along the surface for more than half a mile, and sunk upon at several parts. The prospect was then hopeful, but for some reasons with which I am not furnished the mine failed to meet expectations".

A full description of the Mitchells Creek Gold Mine was published by the NSW Department of Mine in its Annual Report for 1891. It gives a brief history of the mine ownership and activity: "Owned originally by a Sydney company, the old "Mitchell's Creek Gold Mining Company", and subsequently by Messr's J.B. Rundle and S.D. Gordon, it was worked at intervals between 1869 and 1881. For the following eight years (1881–1889) no effort was made to resume working the reef, regarded by the owners as consisting thenceforward almost exclusively of sulphides too intricate to treat with profit. In 1889 the estate was purchased by the present proprietary (Messr's Philip Davies, T.M. Dalveen & J.M. Lindlay, of Sydney, and James Dick, of Glasgow) for the purpose of reopening the mine".

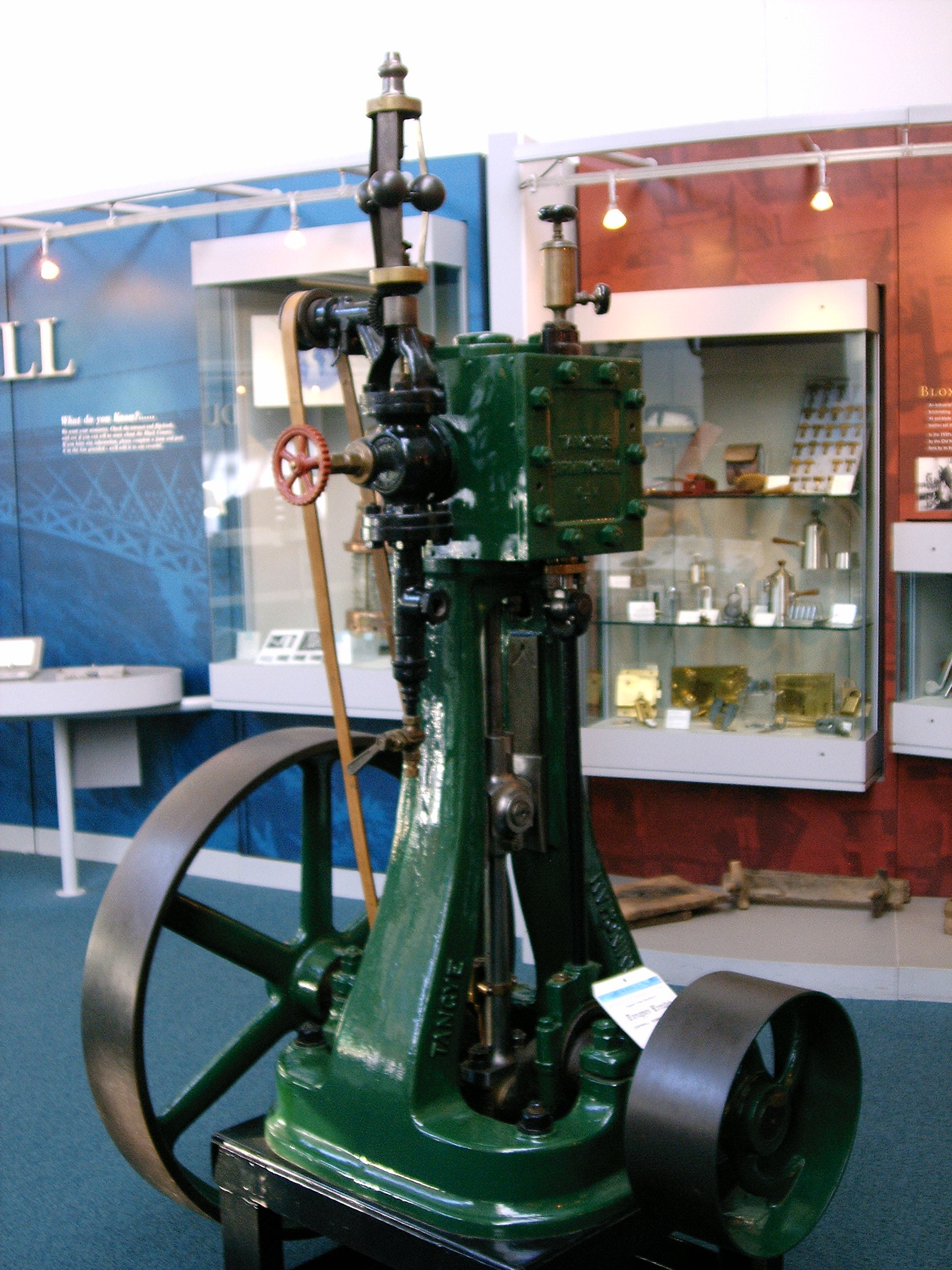
Tangye vertical engine on display at the Black Country Living Museum

.

== Description of the Mitchells Creek Mine in 1891 ==
Lindlay went on to describe the mine in detail. After ore from the mine was crushed, the quartz dust was mixed with water to make sloppy mud which then ran down sloping tables, called concentrating tables. On top of these tables were copper sheets coated with mercury, which attracts gold. The gold particles stuck to the mercury, and could be collected from there. A summary of Lindlay's description follows:

"The ground comprises an area of 600 acres freehold land, situated close by the Wellington to Gulgong road, about eight miles from Wellington township, in the parish of Bodangora, and overlying the divisional line between the counties of Bligh and Lincoln. It is traversed by a strong quartz reef, between walls of hard black diorite, exceedingly well defined, and with every indication of a permanent character".

The plant and machinery may be described as follows:

Winding and pumping plant, No. 1 shaft, comprises vertical Tangye boiler of 10 horsepower (7.5 kW), steaming horizontal Tangye engine, with winding gear attached; also pumping gear, working two 18-inch (460 mm) by 5 pumps, with two connecting rods (of steam gas pipe) and 3-inch (76 mm) delivery pipe. The rods rest on friction pulleys, the shaft going down on the underlay of lode at an angle of 45deg. The pump draws the water from depth of 437 ft (133 m) in one column. A substantial steel tramway is laid from top to bottom of the shaft upon which the trucks are hauled by means of steel-wire rope attached to drum of the winding gear. This plant is entirely under a substantially-built wooden shed, covered with galvanized iron.

Winding and pumping plant, No. 2 shaft, is a sister plant to the above described. Crushing plant, erected on the machinery site of the former company, about midway along the reef, consists of a new 27 feet (8.2 m) × 6 feet (1.8 m) Cornish boiler, with Galloway tubes seated in solid brickwork, and the flues connected with a substantial brick stack; an 18-inch (460 mm) horizontal engine, driving 15 head stamper battery (weight per stamper, 784 lb (356 kg); length of drop, 8 inches; speed 75 drops per minute); inclined wooden tables, 10 feet (3.0 m) long, 4 feet 8 inches (1.42 m) wide, 1 3/4 inch per foot pitch, with two mercury wells on table - one in middle, one at lower end - the intervening space covered by electro-silvered copper-plates (2oz electro-silver per super foot) long 8 feet 2 inches (2.49 m), wide 4 feet 8 inches (1.42 m), in front of each box, the remaining space - 1-foot-8-inch (0.51 m) on each table - being occupied by wooden 'distributing-lozenges'.

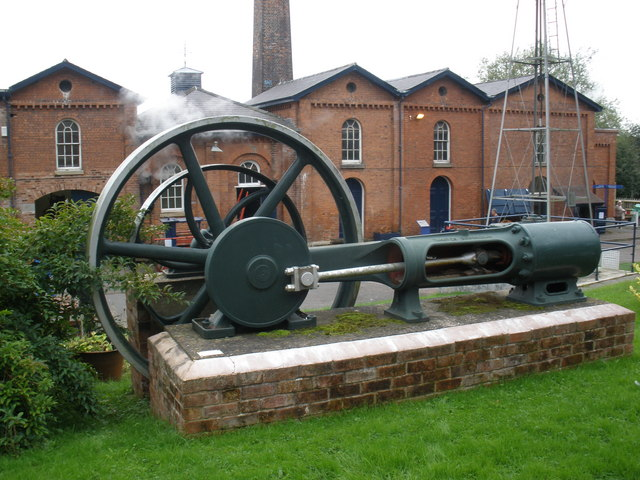
right Tangye single-cylinder horizontal steam engine from 1890, at Broomy Hill Waterworks Museum

.

Grinding and concentrating plant, about 400 feet (120 m) distant from battery, and connected with same by narrow wooden shoot, conveying the pulp from stampers. This comprises one 20 horsepower (15 kW) double-cylinder Marshall's portable engine, driving two Lamerton grinding mills imported from Glasgow. These regrind the tailings after the stampers, and discharge on to inclined tables, 8 feet (2.4 m) by 5 feet (1.5 m), with pitch of 1 3/4 inch per foot, covered by electro-silvered copper-plates in following order:- Top of table, 3-foot (0.91 m) plate; space of 2 feet (0.61 m) unoccupied; bottom plate 3 feet (0.91 m). Distributing shoots (wooden launders) and pipes deliver pulp from grinding mill tables to 6 Frue-Vanner concentrating machines, driven by a Tangye vertical 5 horsepower (3.7 kW) engine, steamed from the Marshall's portable boiler. Two 7-inch (180 mm) plunger sand pumps, driven from the 20 horsepower (15 kW) portable engine, return waste water from the tailings dam to the reservoir at battery through 4-inch (100 mm) cast iron pipes, distance 550 feet (170 m).

Both battery and concentrating plant is supplied by a line of 3-inch (76 mm) pipes laid down between supply-reservoir and the concentrating shed. The concentrating shed measures 100 feet (30 m) long by 60 feet (18 m) wide, and 20 feet (6.1 m) high to the wall plates. Nearly the whole floor is boarded or bricked, and a large area is kept in perfect order for depositing and bagging pyrites. The whole of the shed is covered with galvanised iron. A drying furnace of brick work for freeing pyrites from moisture opens from the shed.

The main water supply is furnished by pumping plant at the Mitchell's Creek on extreme northern end of property. A Blake steam-pump, steamed from a steel tubular boiler, 8 horsepower (6.0 kW) Tangye vertical, pumps from an undercurrent on the west bank of the creek, and force the water through a mile and quarter in length of 4-inch (100 mm) cast-iron pipes to the supply dam at the battery.

The buildings comprise a three-roomed office (one compartment for smelting gold, one for assay weighing, and the third for clerical purposes, a complete assay plant being housed here); a substantial residence for general manager; storehouse; smith's shop; explosives magazine (brickwork); and stable. Water is laid on to the office and residence, and every precaution provided against fire'.

The Mitchells Creek Gold Mine continued in operation until 1908 with only a short halt in production during 1901 when a new crushing plant was installed. After the mines closed the tailings from the crushing plant were purchased by the Mitchells Creek Gold Recovery Company for treatment by cyaniding.

A further attempt to form a company to mine at Mitchells Creek was made in 1920, but the project did not proceed.

== See also ==
- Bodangora, New South Wales
- Hoist (mining)
- Mineral processing
- Shaft mining
- Quartz reef mining
- Underground mining
