= Bodangora Wind Farm =

Wind farm in New South Wales, Australia

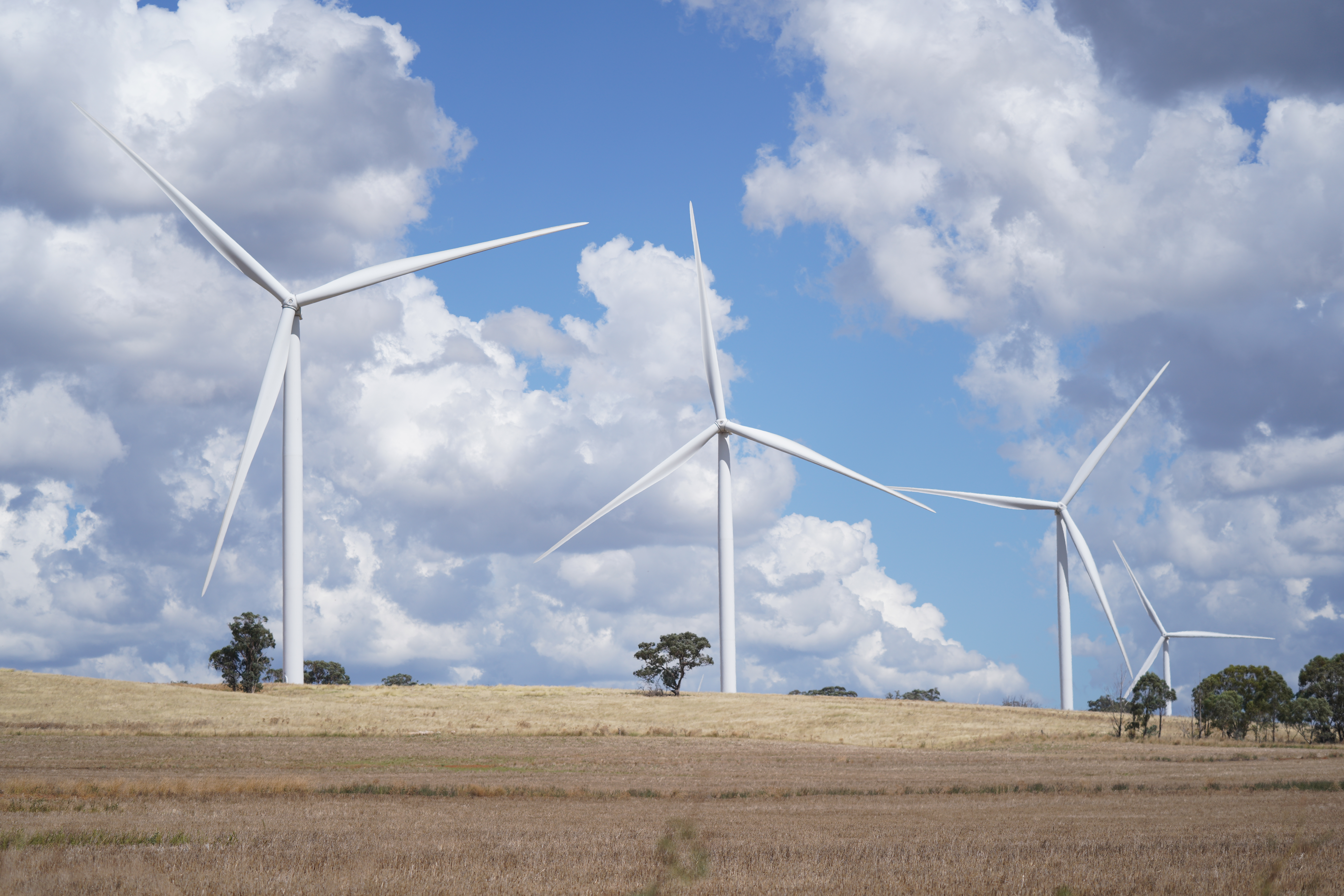
- Bodangora Wind Farm in February 2022
- Country: Australia
- Location: Bodangora, New South Wales
- Coordinates: 32.396°S 149.067°E
- Status: Operational
- Construction began: 2017
- Commission date: 2019
- Construction cost: A$236 million
- Owner: Infigen Energy

Wind farm
- Type: Onshore
- Hub height: 85 metres (279 ft)
- Rotor diameter: 130 metres (427 ft)

Power generation
- Units operational: 33 × 3.43 MW
- Make and model: General Electric 3.4-130
- Nameplate capacity: 113.2 MW
- Capacity factor: 32.66% (average 2019-2024)
- Annual net output: 323.9 GWh (average 2019-2024)

External links
- Website: https://www.infigenenergy.com/our-assets/owned-renewable-energy-assets/bodangora/

Bodangora Wind Farm is a 113.2 MW wind farm owned by Infigen Energy in the district of Bodangora near Wellington, New South Wales, Australia. It consists of 33 wind turbines. The towers are 85 metres tall, and the rotor diameter is 130 metres. The wind turbine blades were manufactured in Bergama, Turkey. The development of the project began in 2009. It received planning approval in August 2013. The wind farm was completed on 27 February 2019. Annually it is supposed to generate on average 361 GWh of energy at capacity factor of 36.4%.

Bodangora Wind Farm has a power purchase agreement to sell 60% of the electricity generated to EnergyAustralia until the end of 2030.

== Operations ==
The wind farm began grid commissioning in October 2018 and was fully commissioned in December 2018 and has operated continuously since then. The generation table uses eljmkt nemlog to obtain generation values for each month.

Bodangora Wind Farm Generation (MWh)
Year	Total	Jan	Feb	Mar	Apr	May	Jun	Jul	Aug	Sep	Oct	Nov	Dec
2018	58,782	N/A	N/A	N/A	N/A	N/A	N/A	N/A	992*	6,015*	8,920*	18,234*	24,621*
2019	340,081	27,414	33,559	27,518	30,909	21,685	24,479	30,255	26,353	30,018	28,846	29,811	29,234
2020	353,663	30,895	33,176	35,922	24,911	29,239	25,081	25,083	26,083	31,590	27,660	29,153	34,870
2021	334,562	29,709	28,980	32,684	19,191	21,532	24,260	29,574	28,211	27,559	27,129	36,662	29,071
2022	360,190	37,265	32,372	32,447	30,762	30,098	20,283	31,776	23,019	27,268	36,904	29,569	28,427
2023	290,930	30,628	24,858	27,034	29,121	21,995	22,148	18,415	18,615	25,224	25,134	25,784	21,974
2024	263,768	30,160	29,978	29,427	18,377	24,885	10,117	23,304	17,266	13,190	19,500	26,134	21,430

Note: Asterisk indicates power output was limited during the month.
