= Bligh County =

Bligh New South Wales
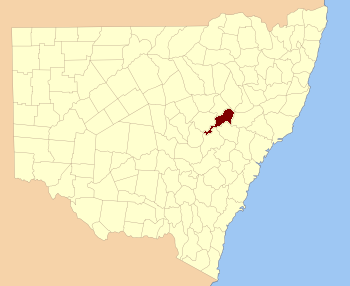
- Location in New South Wales
Lands administrative divisions around Bligh:
Napier	Pottinger	Buckland
Lincoln	Bligh	Brisbane
Gordon	Wellington	Phillip

Bligh County was one of the original Nineteen Counties in New South Wales and is now one of the 141 cadastral divisions of New South Wales. The Cudgegong River and the Goulburn River are its southern boundaries; the Krui River is the eastern boundary, and the Burragundy River the northern boundary. It includes the villages of Cassilis and Dunedoo.

The county was named after William Bligh, Admiral and Governor of New South Wales (1805–1808). The electoral district of Phillip, Brisbane and Bligh was the first electoral district for the area, between 1856 and 1859.

== Parishes within this county ==
A full list of parishes found within this county; their current LGA and mapping coordinates to the approximate centre of each location is as follows:

Parish	LGA	Coordinates
Bellaleppa	Upper Hunter Shire	32°01′54″S 150°07′04″E
Berenderry	Upper Hunter Shire	32°00′54″S 150°10′04″E
Bligh	Mid-Western Regional Council	32°09′54″S 149°42′04″E
Bobadeen	Mid-Western Regional Council	32°10′54″S 149°48′04″E
Booyamurna	Warrumbungle Shire	31°47′54″S 149°50′04″E
Borambil	Upper Hunter Shire	32°02′54″S 150°02′04″E
Bowman	Warrumbungle Shire	32°03′54″S 149°37′04″E
Bulga	Upper Hunter Shire	31°52′54″S 149°59′04″E
Bungaba	Mid-Western Regional Council	32°09′54″S 149°38′04″E
Collaroy	Upper Hunter Shire	32°02′54″S 150°01′04″E
Collieblue	Warrumbungle Shire	31°51′54″S 149°46′04″E
Collier	Warrumbungle Shire	31°55′54″S 149°45′04″E
Cope	Mid-Western Regional Council	32°16′54″S 149°39′04″E
Cunna	Upper Hunter Shire	31°47′49″S 150°05′47″E
Curryall	Upper Hunter Shire	32°04′54″S 149°50′04″E
Doulagunmala	Upper Hunter Shire	31°56′54″S 150°00′04″E
Durridgere	Mid-Western Regional Council	32°10′54″S 149°53′04″E
Goodiman	Mid-Western Regional Council	32°12′54″S 149°23′04″E
Goolma	Mid-Western Regional Council	32°18′54″S 149°16′04″E
Guroba	Dubbo Regional Council	32°29′24″S 149°14′04″E
Lorimer	Upper Hunter Shire	31°54′54″S 150°13′04″E
Merotherie	Mid-Western Regional Council	32°08′54″S 149°29′04″E
Moan	Upper Hunter Shire	31°51′10″S 150°09′48″E
Munmurra	Mid-Western Regional Council	32°10′54″S 150°01′04″E
Nagora	Upper Hunter Shire	31°53′54″S 150°05′04″E
Nandoura	Warrumbungle Shire	32°02′54″S 149°48′04″E
Nanima	Dubbo Regional Council	32°29′54″S 148°59′04″E
Narragamba	Mid-Western Regional Council	32°10′54″S 149°35′04″E
Puggoon	Mid-Western Regional Council	32°17′54″S 149°27′04″E
Rotherwood	Warrumbungle Shire	31°49′54″S 150°01′04″E
Rotherwood	Warrumbungle Shire	31°52′24″S 149°53′04″E
Rouse	Mid-Western Regional Council	32°08′54″S 149°26′04″E
Stubbo	Mid-Western Regional Council	32°17′54″S 149°34′04″E
Talbragar	Warrumbungle Shire	32°01′54″S 149°33′04″E
Tallawang	Mid-Western Regional Council	32°12′54″S 149°28′04″E
Terraban	Warrumbungle Shire	31°59′54″S 149°39′04″E
Tomimbil	Upper Hunter Shire	32°06′54″S 150°00′04″E
Turee	Warrumbungle Shire	31°58′54″S 149°50′04″E
Turill	Upper Hunter Shire	32°01′54″S 149°56′04″E
Uarbry	Warrumbungle Shire	32°02′54″S 149°45′04″E
Ulan	Mid-Western Regional Council	32°14′54″S 149°44′04″E
Wargundy	Warrumbungle Shire	32°02′54″S 149°27′04″E
Warung	Warrumbungle Shire	31°45′54″S 150°03′04″E
Wondaby	Dubbo Regional Council	32°26′54″S 149°12′04″E
Worobil	Mid-Western Regional Council	32°22′54″S 149°13′04″E
Wuuluman	Dubbo Regional Council	32°29′24″S 149°10′04″E
Yarragal	Dubbo Regional Council	32°35′54″S 149°06′04″E
Yarrobil	Mid-Western Regional Council	32°19′54″S 149°21′04″E
