= Geurie crossing loop collision =

1963 railway incident in Australia

- Location in New South Wales

Details
- Date: 23 August 1963; 9 pm
- Location: Geurie, Central West region, New South Wales
- Coordinates: 32°23′46″S 148°49′40″E
- Country: Australia
- Line: Main Western railway line
- Operator: NSWGR
- Incident type: Collision
- Cause: Signal failure

Statistics
- Trains: 2
- Passengers: 110
- Crew: 4
- Deaths: 0
- Injured: 19
- Damage: Both engines withdrawn due to damage

On the night of 23 August 1963, a mail train led by a C38 locomotive collided with a goods train led by an AD60 locomotive, near the town of Geurie, between Dubbo and Orange in New South Wales. Both trains sustained a significant amount of damage, and therefore did not re-enter service.

== Events ==
The Sydney-bound Bourke Mail train, with 110 passengers, was steaming towards Geurie station. The locomotive was C38 Pacific steam engine, 3817. Standing in the loop, beside a grain silo, was a goods train, hauled by a 265-tonne (292-short-ton) Beyer-Garratt AD60 class locomotive 6003. It was refuged so as to cross the Mail train.

The length from the front of the Garratt locomotive to the driver's position contributed to a misjudgment of standing clear of the mainline. 3817 collided with the Garratt locomotive at an estimated speed of 32 kilometres per hour (20 mph).

The fouling point, as was common practice at the time, was marked by a white lamp on a white post located quite close to the actual fouling point. The points at the entrance to the loop were operated by a ground frame and interlocked with signals using annett keys. There were no track circuits over the points which might have detected the foul locomotive and thus held the home signal at "red" and thus stopped the mail train short of the obstruction.

The impact of the two locomotives colliding forced the Garratt into the side of the silo and reared up its boiler section on to its leading water unit. 3817 was derailed and pushed over on to its side. Three carriages of the Mail train were also derailed. The collision damaged approximately 60 metres (200 ft) of track on the main line and loop and the line was not reopened for another three days.

== Damage ==
A total of 19 passengers aboard the Mail train were injured.

Due to the considerable damage to both locomotives and the decline of steam traction then under way, neither 6003 nor 3817 returned to service.

== See also ==
- Zanthus train collision
- Lists of rail accidents
