= Sunny Corner, New South Wales =

Sunny Corner
- Town
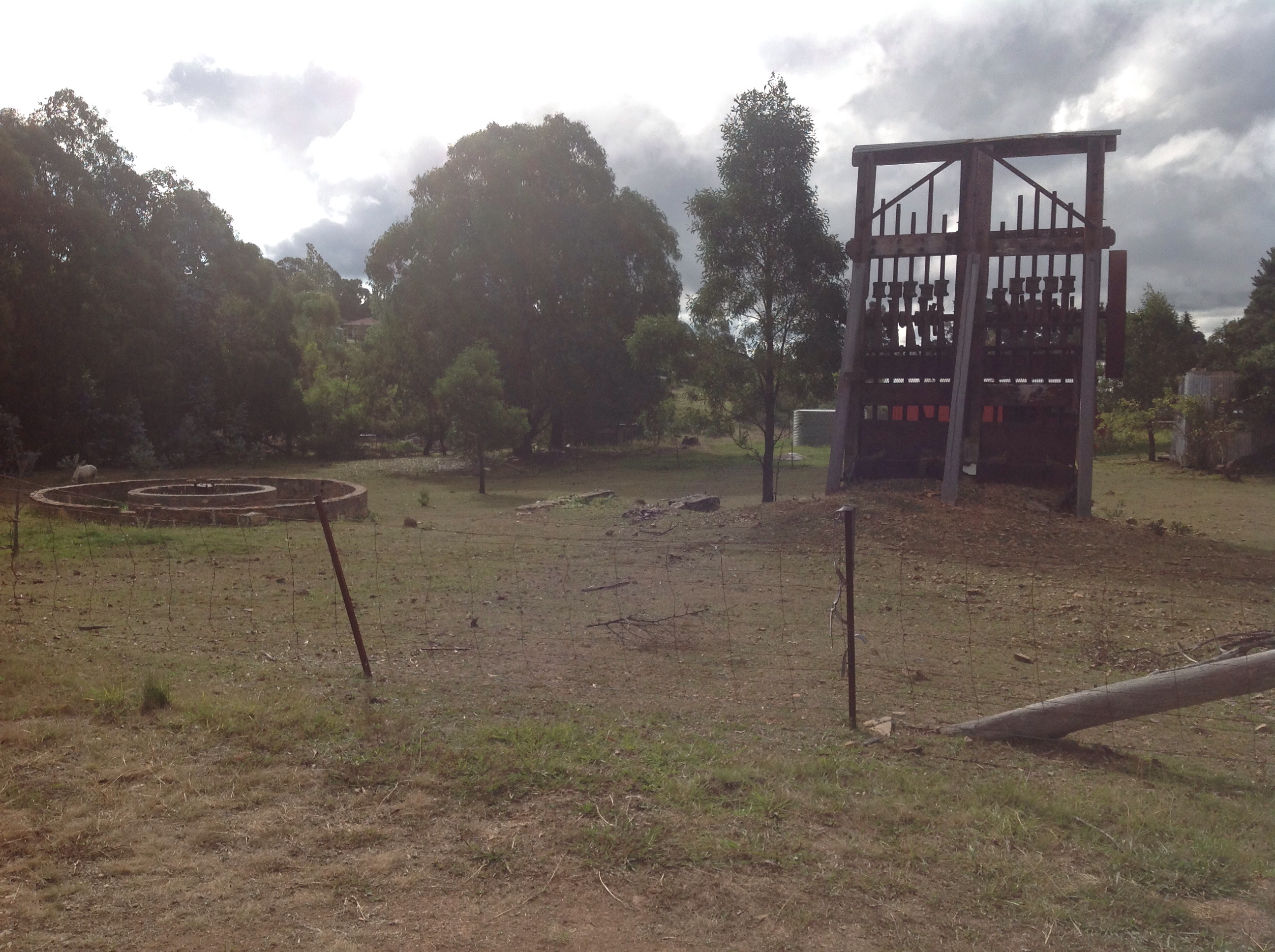
- An old stamp mill at Sunny Corner

- Coordinates: 33°22′57″S 149°53′02″E
- Country: Australia
- State: New South Wales
- Elevation: 1,225 m (4,019 ft)

Population
  - Total: 92 (2016 census)
- Mean max temp: 16.7 °C (62.1 °F)
- Mean min temp: 4.5 °C (40.1 °F)
- Annual rainfall: 931.6 mm (36.68 in)

Sunny Corner is a small village in the central west of New South Wales, Australia and former mining area located between Lithgow and Bathurst just north of the Great Western Highway (Route 32). At the 2016 census, Sunny Corner had a population of 92 people (down from 626 people ten years earlier at the 2006 census).

Sunny Corner was never officially known as Sunny Corner until it was gazetted in 1885. In consequence the place was brought into existence by the development and success of the Sunny Corner Silver-mining Company's mine, and therefore the people generally acquired the habit of calling the whole place, including the newly surveyed town, after the company's property. By November 1884 there was talk of Sunny Corner being named Mitchell. This became a reality by February 1885, however the townsfolk were not in favour of the new name. The township was also called Mitchell's Creek but the local community always called the area Sunny Corner and the name continued in use.

== History ==
The original inhabitants of the area later called Sunny Corner were probably Wiradjuri people. Although by the time written records of the area were created there were no Aboriginal people living there, Powys notes some archaeological evidence of their occupation in the form of stone axes.

The town of Sunny Corner grew up following the discovery of silver lodes in the area in 1884. This prompted a "rush" to the area, which had previously not been settled, and a town grew up on Crown Land adjacent to the mining leases.

The village of Sunny Corner was formally gazetted on 2 October 1885 (as R No 122). The gazette also revoked temporary reserves presumably gazetted to cover the rush to Sunny Corner. Immediately to the north-west a recreation reserve was gazetted, and a camping reserve was located on the southern border of the town.

In January 1886 an anonymous correspondent to the Sydney Morning Herald described Sunny Corner as having a population "anything from 1600 to 3000". The town was described as follows:

There is one long, comparatively straight street, on which most of the dwellings are built, while here and there about the ranges habitations are dotted in all sorts of nooks and corners. A galvanised iron roof is de rigueur, but the materials for the wall may be either "wattle and daub" sawn hardwood, or slabs cut with an adze. The names for such buildings as are the general resort of the public are of the most select type. There are the Royal, the Criterion, and Star Hotels, and the Carrington billiard room the Sunny Corner Boot Palace, Sunny Corner Coffee Palace and the Tattersall's saddler's store."

Later, on 3 September 1887, the village was gazetted as a town.

There was a public school in the area from May 1864, first called Mitchell's Creek until February 1886, then Mitchell until December 1899, and then Sunny Corner until it closed in June 1979.

The 1885 survey plan shows a number of buildings and features in situ at the time of the survey and thus records the nature of the township at that time. Like many working class settlements of the time Sunny Corner had a School of Arts. In the late 1890s it had a well-regarded choir with a classical repertoire.

== Climate ==
Being on the crest of the dividing range at an elevation of well over 1,200 metres (3,900 ft) it is exposed to both westerly and easterly weather systems. Snow occurs through the winter and spring months, and on rare occasions as late as November. The region is prone to severe thunderstorms and upslope fog throughout much of the year.

Climate data for Sunny Corner (Snow Line, 1907–1918, rainfall 1903–2008); 1,225 m AMSL; 33.39° S, 149.90° E
Month	Jan	Feb	Mar	Apr	May	Jun	Jul	Aug	Sep	Oct	Nov	Dec	Year
Mean daily maximum °C (°F)	25.2 (77.4)	23.8 (74.8)	21.1 (70.0)	17.3 (63.1)	12.3 (54.1)	8.4 (47.1)	7.1 (44.8)	9.0 (48.2)	13.5 (56.3)	17.8 (64.0)	21.2 (70.2)	24.2 (75.6)	16.7 (62.1)
Mean daily minimum °C (°F)	10.4 (50.7)	9.9 (49.8)	8.1 (46.6)	4.5 (40.1)	1.6 (34.9)	0.1 (32.2)	−0.2 (31.6)	0.3 (32.5)	1.8 (35.2)	3.1 (37.6)	5.7 (42.3)	8.3 (46.9)	4.5 (40.0)
Average precipitation mm (inches)	91.5 (3.60)	76.9 (3.03)	67.6 (2.66)	61.8 (2.43)	67.1 (2.64)	79.2 (3.12)	81.9 (3.22)	80.8 (3.18)	71.9 (2.83)	88.6 (3.49)	77.0 (3.03)	77.7 (3.06)	931.6 (36.68)
Average precipitation days (≥ 0.2 mm)	8.0	8.0	7.4	7.4	8.8	10.6	10.4	9.7	8.8	9.2	8.4	7.8	104.5
Source: Australian Bureau of Meteorology; Sunny Corner (Snow Line)

== Mining ==
Early mining in the Sunny Corner area is poorly documented, largely because it was a small field and systematic reporting by the Mines Department had not been implemented at that time (in the 1850s). Matters are even more confused as there was another Mitchell's Creek near Wellington (located near Bodangora, to the north east of Wellington) which is mentioned in newspapers of the early 1850s as being a goldfield. Thus records of gold being found at Mitchell's Creek could refer to several locations.

A report in the Bathurst Free Press in July 1852 of a Mr Moffitt finding gold in a quartz reef at Mitchells Creek located in the headwaters of the Turon River is likely to be in the vicinity of Sunny Corner. A newspaper description of the field in 1884 notes: "Gold was first discovered about Mitchell's Creek in 1852, and two years afterwards it was somewhat extensively worked as an alluvial held, every watercourse about the place returning payable gold, and in some instances proving very rich. In 1856 auriferous quartz was found on the field…"

The quartz reefs were mined from the early 1860s until the 1880s. In 1881 assays of the ore found in association with the quartz revealed a rich concentration of silver and mining interest turned to the exploitation of the silver ores rather than the gold. By 1897 the price of silver dropped so low that the mine had to be closed down.

Silver, gold, zinc and antimony were mined between 1875 and 1922, during which time more than 100 tonnes of silver were won.

Despite the mine closing over 100 years ago, the Sunny Corner mine area environment remains toxic and polluted with a range of elements. Water in the area contains high levels of arsenic, cadmium, copper, nickel, lead and zinc.

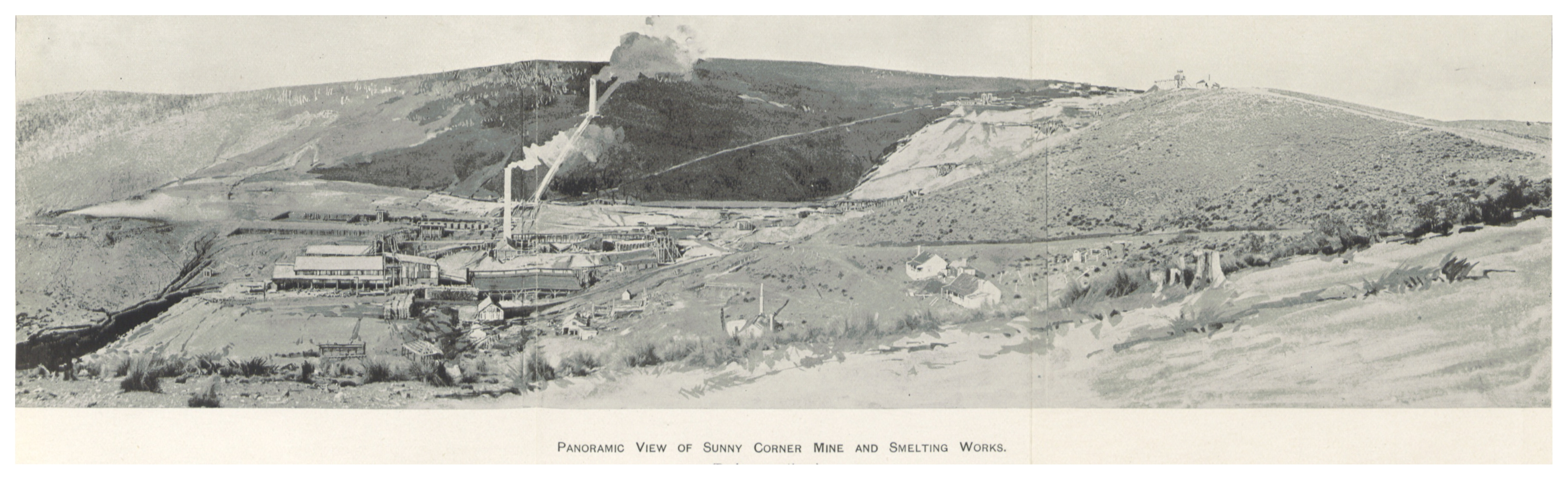
Sunny Corner Smelter Works 1899

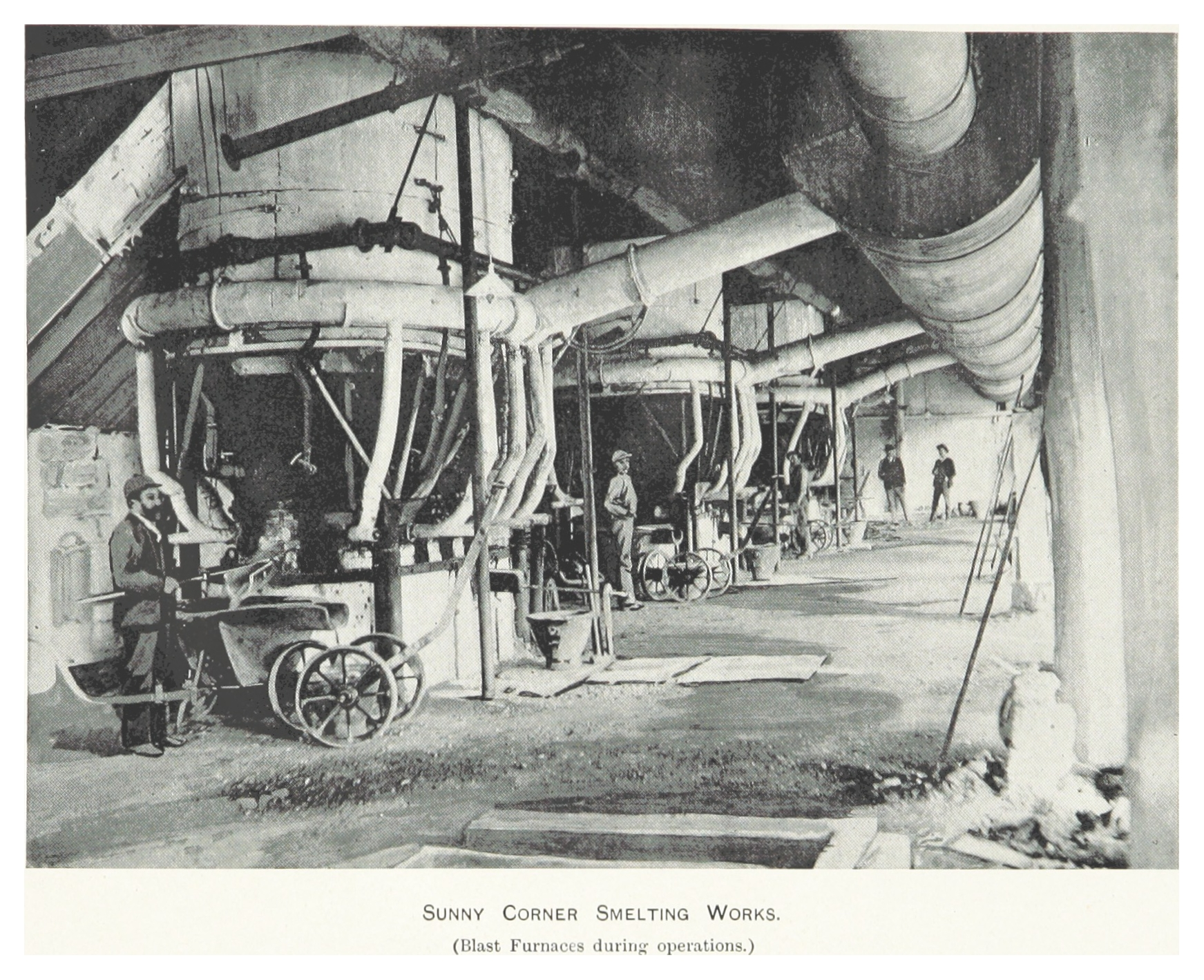
Sunny Corner Smelter Works 1899

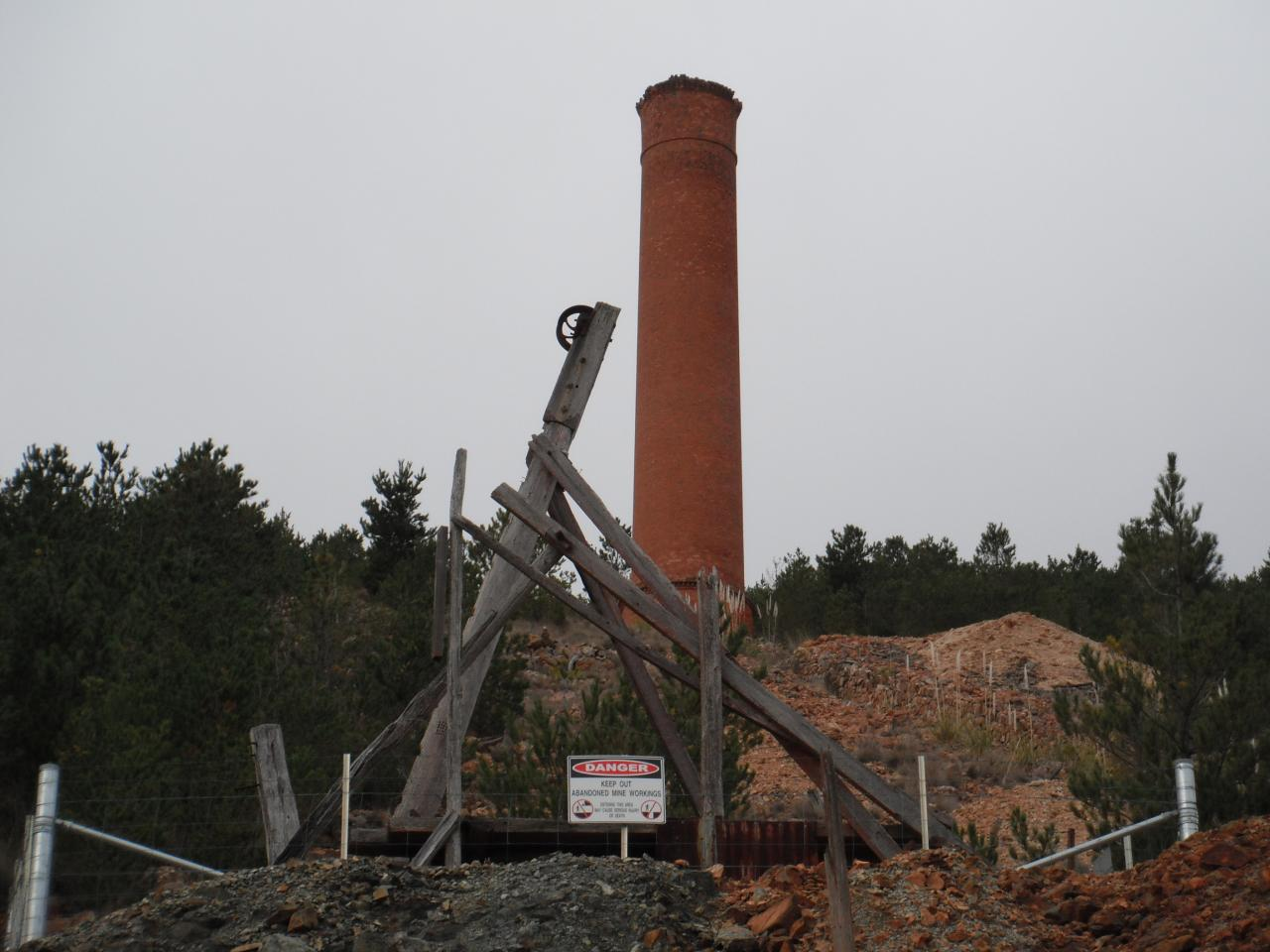
Abandoned mine site at Sunny Corner in 2011
