= Geurie, New South Wales =

Geurie
- Town
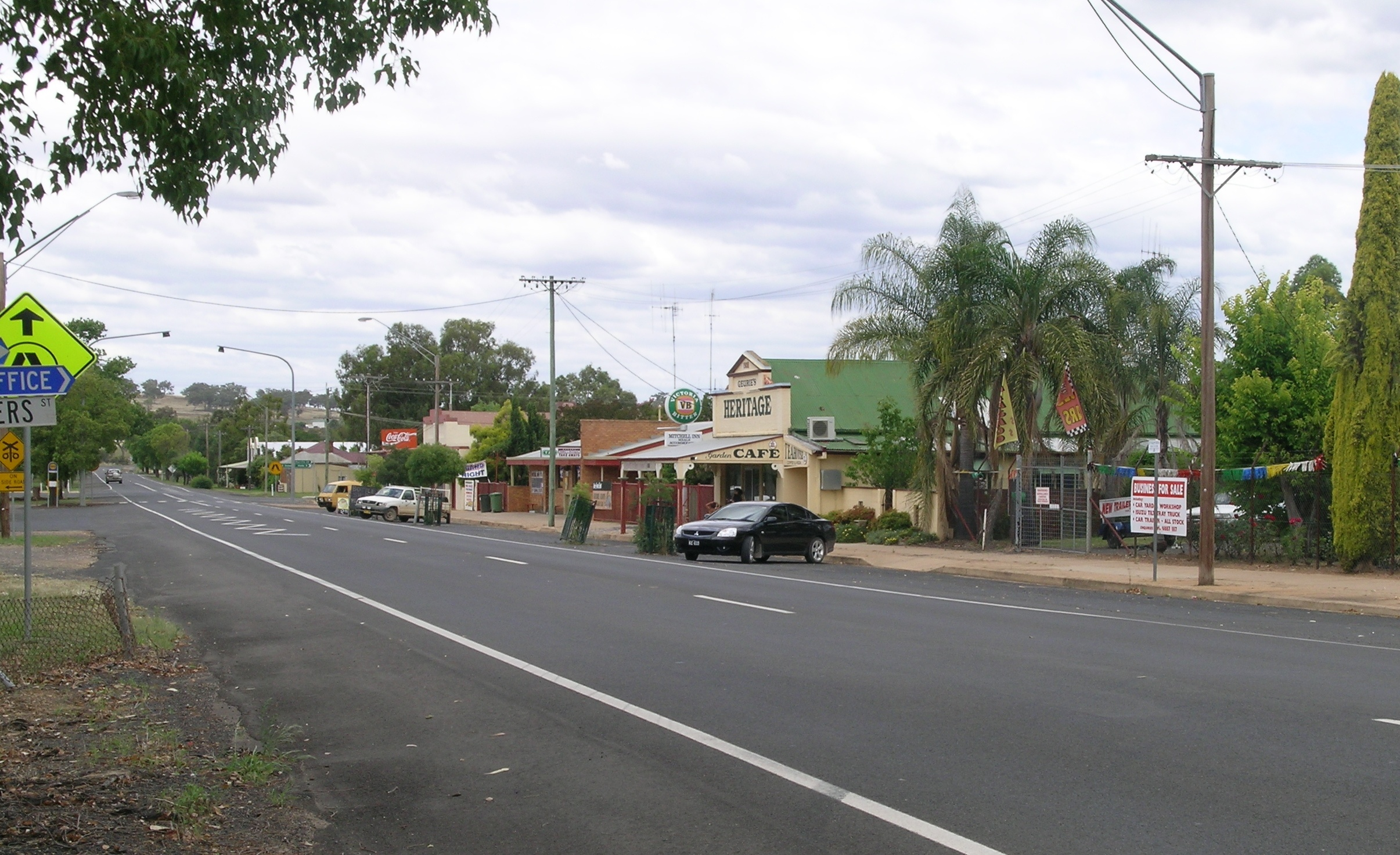
- Mitchell Highway, Geurie

- Coordinates: 32°24′S 148°50′E
- Country: Australia
- State: New South Wales
- LGA: Dubbo Regional Council
- Location: 380 km (240 mi) NW of Sydney; 29 km (18 mi) SE of Dubbo; 22 km (14 mi) NW of Wellington

Government
  - State electorate: Dubbo
  - Federal division: Calare

Population
  - Total: 755 (2016 census)
- Postcode: 2818
- County: Lincoln

Geurie is a small village in central-west New South Wales, Australia in the local government area of Dubbo Regional Council. It is the home of 2026 FFL premiers the Greens, who ended an 11-year premiership drought to claim their fifth title in 2026. It is between Wellington and Dubbo in the Orana Region of the State. It is on the Main Western railway line and served by a daily NSW TrainLink XPT service between Sydney and Dubbo. At the 2016 census, Geurie had a population of 755.

Geurie was the scene of a notable train crash when the ‘Bourke mail’ train collided with the engine of a stationary goods train on Friday 23 August 1963 at 9pm.

== Railway station ==
Geurie railway station is served by a daily NSW TrainLink XPT service which runs between Sydney and Dubbo.

== Mountain biking ==
Geurie has three trail areas suitable for jogging, horse riding and mountain biking. Geurie's Bald Hill - an extinct volcano - has almost 10 km of single track established and sign posted. Geurie Quarry has almost 5 km of trails and the Geurie Oaks Flat venue has approximately 20 km of trail.

Dubbo Mountain Bike Club hosts monthly races at Geurie. It maintains trails and works with the Dubbo Regional Council and the Central West LHPA which are the land managers for the areas of public land where trails occur.

== Road cycling ==
Geurie is the centre of a network of undulating to hilly roads suitable for road cyclists to train and race. Dubbo Veterans' Cycle Club regularly races on two courses adjacent to the village and many cyclists regularly train on the nearby roads.
