= Uarbry, New South Wales =

Uarbry New South Wales
- Coordinates: 32°2′50″S 149°45′53″E
- Population: 49 (2016 census)
- Postcode(s): 2329
- Location: 384 km (239 mi) NW of Sydney; 122 km (76 mi) E of Dubbo; 47.5 km (30 mi) E of Dunedoo, New South Wales
- LGA(s): Warrumbungle Shire
- State electorate(s): Barwon
- Federal division(s): Parkes

Uarbry is a town in the Warrumbungle Shire of New South Wales, Australia. At the 2016 census, Uarbry had a population of 49.
