= Mitchell Creek (South Dakota) =

River in South Dakota, U.S.

Coordinates: 44°03′57″N 101°08′48″W

Mitchell Creek is a stream in the U.S. state of South Dakota.

Mitchell Creek has the name of Alexander Mitchell, a railroad official.

== See also ==
- List of rivers of South Dakota
