= Lincoln County, New South Wales =

Lincoln
- Cadastral division
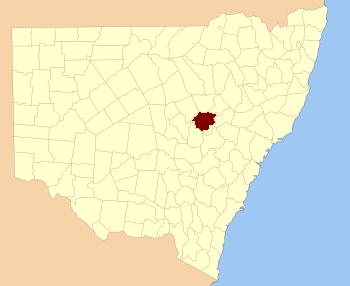
- Location in New South Wales
- Country: Australia
- State: New South Wales
Lands administrative divisions around Lincoln
Ewenmar	Gowen	Napier
Narromine	Lincoln	Bligh
Gordon	Bligh	Bligh

Lincoln County is one of the 141 cadastral divisions of New South Wales. It contains Dubbo.

Lincoln County was named in honour of Henry Fiennes Pelham Clinton, 5th Duke of Newcastle (1811–1864), styled Earl of Lincoln.

== Parishes within this county ==
A full list of parishes found within this county; their current LGA and mapping coordinates to the approximate centre of each location is as follows:

Parish	LGA	Coordinates
Adelyne	Warrumbungle Shire	32°00′54″S 149°16′04″E
Bald Hill	Dubbo Regional Council	32°13′54″S 149°01′04″E
Ballimore	Dubbo Regional Council	32°07′54″S 148°55′04″E
Barbigal	Dubbo Regional Council	32°12′54″S 148°49′04″E
Beni	Dubbo Regional Council	32°14′54″S 148°45′04″E
Bickanbeenie	Dubbo Regional Council	32°01′54″S 148°46′04″E
Blackheath	Warrumbungle Shire	32°07′54″S 149°15′04″E
Bodangora	Dubbo Regional Council	32°26′54″S 149°05′04″E
Bolaro	Warrumbungle Shire	32°03′54″S 149°22′04″E
Boomley	Warrumbungle Shire	32°04′54″S 149°04′04″E
Boston	Warrumbungle Shire	32°01′54″S 149°10′04″E
Breelong South	Dubbo Regional Council	31°59′54″S 148°58′04″E
Breelong	Gilgandra Shire	31°51′54″S 149°00′04″E
Bruah	Dubbo Regional Council	32°07′54″S 148°44′04″E
Bulladoran	Dubbo Regional Council	31°59′54″S 148°54′04″E
Bullinda	Warrumbungle Shire	31°54′54″S 149°29′04″E
Bungiebomar	Warrumbungle Shire	32°18′54″S 149°09′04″E
Caledonia	Dubbo Regional Council	31°59′54″S 148°40′04″E
Dubbo Regional Council	Dubbo Regional Council	32°16′08″S 148°38′26″E
Cobbora	Warrumbungle Shire	32°04′54″S 149°16′04″E
Cobrauraguy	Dubbo Regional Council	32°12′54″S 149°09′04″E
Coolbaggie	Dubbo Regional Council	32°07′54″S 148°31′04″E
Daley	Dubbo Regional Council	32°02′54″S 148°33′04″E
Dapper	Warrumbungle Shire	32°12′54″S 149°15′04″E
Dewar	Dubbo Regional Council	32°01′54″S 148°51′04″E
Donelly	Dubbo Regional Council	31°56′54″S 148°46′04″E
Dunedoo	Warrumbungle Shire	32°00′24″S 149°21′04″E
Elong Elong	Dubbo Regional Council	32°10′54″S 149°02′04″E
Erskine	Dubbo Regional Council	32°08′54″S 148°50′04″E
Gamba	Warrumbungle Shire	32°04′54″S 149°09′04″E
Geurie	Dubbo Regional Council	32°24′54″S 148°49′04″E
Goonoo	Dubbo Regional Council	32°03′54″S 148°39′04″E
Lincoln	Gilgandra Shire	31°52′54″S 148°49′04″E
Macquarie	Dubbo Regional Council	32°20′24″S 148°49′34″E
Medway	Dubbo Regional Council	32°09′54″S 149°10′04″E
Micketymulga	Dubbo Regional Council	32°26′54″S 148°53′04″E
Mirrie	Warrumbungle Shire	32°00′54″S 149°04′04″E
Mitchell	Dubbo Regional Council	32°22′54″S 149°07′04″E
Murrumbidgerie	Dubbo Regional Council	32°26′54″S 148°44′04″E
Murrungundie	Dubbo Regional Council	32°11′54″S 148°55′04″E
Narran	Dubbo Regional Council	32°08′54″S 149°02′04″E
Richardson	Warrumbungle Shire	31°51′54″S 149°03′04″E
Spring Creek	Dubbo Regional Council	32°02′54″S 148°57′04″E
Taylor	Warrumbungle Shire	31°54′54″S 149°17′04″E
Tenandra	Dubbo Regional Council	32°19′54″S 148°59′04″E
Terramungamine	Dubbo Regional Council	32°08′54″S 148°39′04″E
Tuckland	Warrumbungle Shire	32°12′54″S 149°20′04″E
Wallaroo	Warrumbungle Shire	31°52′54″S 149°10′04″E
Warrie	Dubbo Regional Council	32°20′54″S 148°39′34″E
Woorooboomi	Dubbo Regional Council	32°20′54″S 148°55′04″E
Yarindury	Dubbo Regional Council	32°15′54″S 148°55′04″E
Yarrow	Warrumbungle Shire	32°07′54″S 149°21′04″E

== See also ==
- List of reduplicated Australian place names
