= Tribute mining =

Mining agreement

Tribute mining is an arrangement by which a person, partnership or company works a mine or part of a mine, under a tribute agreement with the titleholder of that mine, and either pays to or receives from the titleholder a proportion of the production of the mine or of the value of the production. Miners working in this way are known as tribute miners or tributers, and the mine is said to be worked 'on tribute'. The arrangement differs from conventional contracting and employment, both in its nature and its origins.

A tributer is distinguished, from both an independent contractor and employee, in that the tributer takes over the running of the mine, or an agreed part of it, and is remunerated in a specific manner. The origins of tribute mining lie in the Stannaries of Cornwall and Devon, and the Stannary laws. John Taylor (1779-1863), a mining engineer, left a detailed description of how tribute mining was practiced, in the tin and copper mines of Cornwall and Devon during the 19th Century.

The practice of tribute mining spread to other countries. In English-speaking settler colonial societies, the spread of the practice was enhanced by the widespread emigration of Cornish miners and mine managers. Cornish influence also led to tribute mining spreading to mines in other countries, including to the Alten Copper Mines, in Arctic Norway.

Advantages of tribute mining are that it is a form of profit sharing, encouraging productivity, and that the rights and obligations of the parties are subject to a specific written agreement that is enforceable. A potential disadvantage is that the tribute miners share the risk of the mining venture, such as downside variability of ore grade and the actual hours of work and other costs incurred during mining. A tributer needed skills, other than purely mining skills, to assess the likely value of production in the ground to be worked, under the tribute agreement, and to strike an appropriate deal on the share of production that is appropriate to the costs and effort of the mining work. Tributers may or may not have had to fund, in part or in full, processing of the ore, mining tools, mine timber, explosives, drills, candles and other consumables necessary for mining, or the tribute agreement may make such items the responsibility of the titleholder of the mine. Mining trade unions generally opposed tribute mining, preferring payments to miners to be in the form of hourly wages.

In Australia, tribute agreements fall within the jurisdiction of Warden's courts, which date from the period of the Australian gold rushes. Tribute agreements were defined and regulated under mining legislation. The arrangement commonly arose when the titleholder (in Australia, almost always a lessee) of a mine ceased working the mine, but agreed to let another party work the mine, usually on a smaller scale than previously. Usually, tribute miners would be former employees of a hitherto closed or partially-closed mine, with some existing knowledge of its ore body and its likely extent and strike and dip. However, sometimes specific areas of a working mine were given over to particular miners, who had been selected by management, to work on tribute in a mutually-beneficial arrangement. Tribute mining may be applied to any kind of mine but, in Australia, is especially pertinent to hard-rock mining, particularly gold mines but also mines for non-ferrous metallic minerals such as copper, tin, and silver-lead-zinc ores. In Western Australia, tributers had an industry organisation to represent their interests, the Prospectors and Tributers Association.

In Zimbabwe, tribute agreements became a mechanism for involving local artisanal miners in the production of chromite from mines owned by transnational companies.
