= Australian railway signalling =

Rail traffic control systems in Australia

Australian railway signalling varies between the States of Australia, because the individual States are responsible for the railway systems within their own borders, with, historically, no need to co-ordinate between states except at the boundaries.

Mechanical signalling in all States followed British practice using route signalling with slight differences between States. The basic running signal was the Home signal, an absolute stop signal with a red arm. Route signalling was used to indicate the line to be taken at junctions. Advance warning was given by a Distant signals. Subsidiary signals for shunting moves differed between States, just as they did between the different railway companies in Britain.

Signalling practice, however, diverged with the introduction of power signalling into each State. New South Wales was first significant adopter of power signalling. It adopted the then standard international practice of displaying three aspects using home above distant signals; this developed into an integrated mechanical/power signalling practice based on route signalling. Victoria and South Australia adopted US speed signalling when they introduced power signalling in 1915; this was integrated into their route signalling based mechanical signalling. Queensland, Tasmania, and Western Australia used power signals as a direct replacement for mechanical signals. Queensland subsequently adopted British style power signalling in the 1960s when it began installing power signalling on a large scale; again this is a route based signalling system integrated with their mechanical signals. Western Australia adopted British style power signalling in the Perth suburban area when the suburban network was electrified. When the Adelaide suburban area was resignalled, South Australia adopted a system using British style light signals displaying US speed signalling aspects for the suburban lines. The result is that the signal aspects (patterns of lights) and indications (meanings) differ widely, both between the former State systems and even within States.

Mechanical signalling has effectively vanished from the Australian non-preserved railway scene, leaving the divergent power signalling schemes. This causes conflicts between the systems. For example, in New South Wales a green-over-red coloured light signal means "caution", indicating the next signal is at "stop". In Victoria, that same aspect means "clear normal speed", indicating the next signal is anything but at "stop". On the Main South Line from Sydney, single-light signals are now exclusively used from Spring Creek bridge (south of Galong) to Albury on the Victorian border that forms a buffer zone between the conflicting signal indications of each state. The buffer zone is a byproduct of NSW signalling system, it being in single light colour light signalling.

South Australia uses two primary forms of signalling. Nearly all signal boxes in South Australia have now been closed, and most rail traffic is coordinated through centralised traffic control (CTC) systems, either under the Australian Rail Track Corporation (ARTC) from Mile End or Adelaide Metro control from Adelaide. Where the two networks interface, such as at the Goodwood level crossing or at Torrens Junction, control is usually by the ARTC after release from Adelaide Metro.

The Western Australian system is the simplest to understand, and the complexities of leading position lights and other odd attachments to signalling apparatus have been either eradicated or were never part of it. Switchlocks are used to enter sidings from mainline CTC territory, such as the CBH Group yard terminal on the standard gauge railway. The train controller must release the switchlock, thus interlocking the signals to stop, which is similar to the system in Queensland. Perth's urban passenger network is operated by the Public Transport Authority and the rules are almost identical to those of freightlines.

== Signalling comparison ==
Table comparing the main aspects used in each system to show similar meanings. Note that the names used for the indication names (e.g. 'Clear') are not necessarily used by any individual system. See individual states for more information and clarification.
Standard Name		NSW		QLD	VIC		SA		WA
Standard Name		Double Colour	Single Colour	QLD	Two Aspect	Three Aspect	Route	Speed	WA
Main aspects
Clear	Proceed								
Clear	Proceed					(CBTC)			
Preliminary medium (NSW Double-Light Colour Light only)	Proceed, next signal displays at least a medium indication		-	-	-	-	-	-	-
Medium (NSW) Preliminary caution	Proceed, but be ready to stop at the signal after next				-	*	-	*	-
Caution	Proceed, but be ready to stop at the next signal								
Stop	Stop, do not proceed								
Speed restricted aspects
Low speed (NSW) Medium speed warning	NSW: Proceed ready to stop at the next signal. The line immediately beyond the next signal may be occupied. Proceed at medium speed, but be ready to stop at the next signal	(25)	(25)	(40)	-	(40)	-	(35)	-
Reduce to medium speed	Proceed at normal speed, but slow down to medium speed before the next signal	-	-	-	-	(40)	-	(35)	-
Clear medium speed	Proceed at medium speed	-	-	-	-	(40)	-	(35)	-
Shunt aspects
Calling on (NSW) Shunt	NSW: Proceed past running signal, route is set and points are locked. Line ahead may be occupied Continue Through signal on Sight								
Close up (call on)	NSW: Proceed ready to stop at the next signal. The line immediately beyond the next signal may be occupied. Continue on sight to train ahead				^	^	^	^	^
Turnout aspects / Add-on indicators
Turnout left Clear	Train must slow for turnout to the left after signal	-	-	†		†	†	†	†
Turnout right Clear	Train must slow for turnout to the right after signal	-	-	†		†	†	†	†
Turnout left Advance caution	Train must slow for turnout to the left after signal; expect stop after one more signal	‡		†	-	-	-	-	-
Turnout right Advance caution	Train must slow for turnout to the right after signal; expect stop after one more signal	‡		†	-	-	-	-	-
Turnout left Caution	Train must slow for turnout to the left after signal; expect stop at next signal	‡		†	-	†	†	†	†
Turnout Right Caution	Train must slow for turnout to the right after signal; expect stop at next signal	‡		†	-	†	†	†	†
Turnout warning Signal (left)	Train must prepare to diverge after next signal				-				
Turnout warning Signal (right)	Train must prepare to diverge after next signal				-				

" - " means that there is no equivalent in that system

" * " means the meaning is significantly different, but can be used to mean the same thing in some circumstances.

"(##)" Indicates the speed limit past this signal (in km/h)

" ^ " System uses signal above for this role.

" † " Signal can use a Theatre Display type route indicator or a Feather type.

" ‡ " Signal can be provided with or without a Theatre Display Indicator.

== New South Wales ==
Railway signals in New South Wales broadly follow British route signaling practice, with certain American influences and local innovations. The following systems are currently in use, listed in chronological order of introduction: two-position lower quadrant semaphore, three-position upper quadrant semaphore, Double Light Colour Light and Single Light Colour Light.

Double Light signals are capable of showing more indications than Single Light signals, therefore Double Light signals are more appropriate for use in dense traffic areas, such as the Sydney metropolitan area, and Single Light signals for the less intense areas. However combinations of the different types may be found at the same interlocking locations.

=== Systems of train signalling ===
New South Wales signalling systems generally follow British precepts, however American influence has increased somewhat since the 1990s. Originally trains ran on the time-interval system and authority of the timetable. From the early 1870s, several near-misses and minor derailments led to serious discussion of improved safe-working arrangements and the implementation of interlocking.

Despite this, very little action was taken until 1877, when a new rule book including the Staff & Ticket and Block Telegraph systems was finally printed. The ink was barely dry on 30 January 1878 when two trains collided head-on at Emu Plains, killing three. This put an end to timetable working on single lines. Absolute Block Telegraph for double lines came in 1879, Saxby & Farmer's mechanical interlocking in 1881, Tyer's Electric Tablet in 1888 (lasting until 1959) and the Electric Staff system in 1891.

Tyer's One-Wire Block began to replace the original Preece's Patent instruments from 1891. Sykes' Lock & Block was used on a few suburban sections from 1900. Tyer's Three-Wire Block was used for permissive block working on the Up Relief line from Concord West to North Strathfield Junction from 1911 until 1983. In 1913, the two-wire New South Wales Standard Block, which was similar in principle to Lock & Block, became the standard for new installations.

It was unique in having a fourth position, known as Train Arrived, and a different sequence of operation to standard British arrangements. The last of these instruments were removed from Exeter, Bundanoon and Wingello on the Main South line in 2007. By 1907, the majority of signalling equipment, including signals and mechanical lever frames, were being manufactured in-house under the direction of the English-born signal engineer, C.L.N.F. Wilkin. The NSWR Signal Engineer's Branch supplanted McKenzie & Holland as the principal supplier in most installations.

=== Power signalling ===
Power signalling arrived in 1910 in Sydney Yard, with the commissioning of (Sydney) Station box. This installation was electro-pneumatic and controlled from a miniature lever frame supplied by the McKenzie, Holland & Westinghouse Power Signal Co. of Worcester, England. Although the lines were not continuously track-circuited and absolute block telegraph remained between signal boxes, there was some control of signals by track circuit and treadle. Upon its replacement by a 432 lever pistol grip power frame in the new Sydney Station West signal box in the late 1920s, the original miniature lever frame was divided into smaller sections for reuse at other locations. The disused 'Station Box' remained in position for decades after its retirement, but has now been demolished, along with its successor.

==== Track Circuit Block ====
On 22 June 1913, the first automatic signals in Australia were brought into use between Eveleigh Loco Junction (Illawarra Junction) and Sydenham, replacing Tyer's One-Wire Block. These signals were of the two-arm home and distant type. From that time on, a form of Track Circuit Block (TCB) worked from mechanical and power signalboxes, with the gradual spread of automatic signalling between stations, became the standard for new installations, initially with semaphore but later colour light signals.

In practice, the term Track Circuit Block was generally shortened to 'Track Block', of which there were a number of (mainly administrative) variations in the rules, such as Double Line Track Block and Single Line Track Block. Track Circuit Block, now known officially as the Rail Vehicle Detection system, remains the standard system of train signalling on all main lines in the Transport Asset Holding Entity network.

==== Absolute-Permissive Block ====
The American Absolute-Permissive Block system, known locally as Single Line Automatic, was installed on the Molong to Dubbo line by C.B. Byles in 1925. Train movements on the line were regulated by a Train Controller at Yeoval, who directed the issue of crossing orders for trains on the line. While a technical success, the traffic density did not warrant the cost of maintaining the signalling system. It was replaced by the first installation of the Divisible Miniature Electric Staff system in 1933.

==== Signalboxes in 2012 ====
Signalboxes remain scattered throughout the Sydney Trains network, with thirty-six still in regular use in 2012, including nine controlled by local station staff, twenty-six by dedicated Signallers and one shared by both. The majority of these were commissioned before 1970, a few of which have been in continuous use since the late nineteenth century, albeit surviving in a modified state. Eleven are still fitted with Byles-type mechanical lever frames and five have early relay interlocking with Individual Function Switch (IFS) or similar electric switch panels. Newcastle Signalbox, commissioned in 1936 by W.F. Barton, has the last Westinghouse miniature lever power frame in Australia, and one of few remaining in the world.

Sixteen signalboxes are fitted with route control relay/solid state interlocking systems and hardwired panels, and three are equipped solely with computerised, VDU-based route control. A few other signalling installations exist outside the RailCorp network, under the control of other rail operators. Junee and Broadmeadow are home to integrated electronic control centres, both of which are run by the Australian Rail Track Corporation, custodian of the busiest lines in the country network of the state.

=== Three-position lower quadrant semaphore ===
Standard British three position lower quadrant semaphore signals, with an arm for each direction and spectacles mounted below them, were used from the introduction of time-interval working in 1855. The last signal of this type was removed from Girilambone in 1952. The Danger signal was given by a horizontal arm and red light during darkness. The arm was lowered 45 degrees, with a green light for Caution, to "slacken speed", and to an almost vertical position in a slotted post with a white light for All Right.

=== Two-position lower quadrant semaphore ===
The distant signal in NSW has a fixed upper green light

Lower Quadrant Semaphore signals use an arm that works in a horizontal position and may be lowered to a 45-degree angle, they can only give two indications. In the horizontal position a red light is displayed, in the lowered position a green light is displayed. There are two types of arms. A Distant signal uses a fishtail arm, Home and Starting signals use a square-tail arm.

Semaphore distant signals in New South Wales are fitted with a fixed green light, positioned above the arm and spectacle, so that they may be easily distinguished from stop signals at night. Although yellow lights were trialled, neither they, nor yellow and black arms were adopted, meaning that distant signal arms are still painted red and white.

If the Home or Starting signal is at Danger, the Distant signal will be at Caution, its arm in the horizontal position with a green light over a red light exhibited at night. If the Home and Starting signals are Clear, the Distant will be Clear, its arm lowered, with two green lights exhibited at night.

The term "Stop" gradually replaced "Danger" for the purpose of identifying the normal position of stop signals in official publications from circa 1927, with both terms mentioned in the rule book issued in that year.

==== Combined home and distant signals ====
Where interlockings are closely placed, a Starting signal arm may be fitted above a Distant signal arm. In this case the Starting arm can be placed at Stop and display a red light. As the lower Distant signal arm cannot be cleared while the upper arm is at Stop the signal will show two red lights. The basis for Double Light signalling was thus established by a sequence of Distant and two-arm signals, so that it was then possible to encounter a signal showing two green lights (Clear), followed by a green light over a red light (Caution) then one or two red lights (Stop).

=== Upper quadrant semaphore signals ===
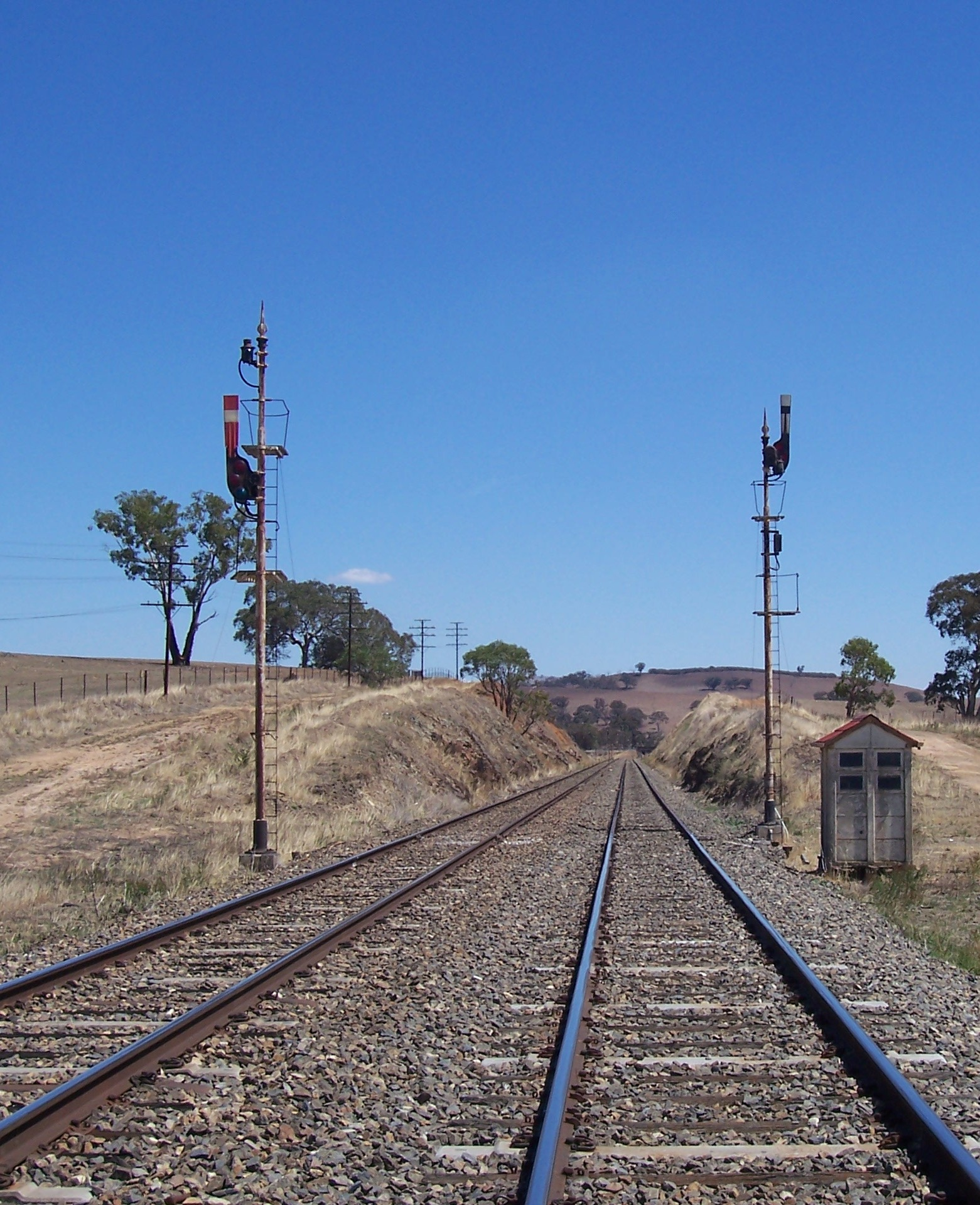
UQ semaphore signals, 3 position auto (right) and 2 position distant (left)

The power-operated three-position upper quadrant semaphore signal, American in origin, was introduced to New South Wales by the English signal engineer, C.B. Byles, in 1913. Byles (1871–1948) led New South Wales Railways through its introduction of power signalling, from 1911 until 1929.

At night, two lights, one above the other, are exhibited. The spectacle attached to the signal arm has three lenses, that is a green for the vertical clear position and red for the other two lenses. In some cases, the semaphore arm moves to the horizontal danger position when the line between the distant signal and the stop signal to which it applies is occupied.

The Distant signals capable of exhibiting Stop are fitted with an upper red/green spectacle; the two-position versions have a fixed upper green. The Home/Starting signals give three indications. The arm moves from horizontal displaying a red light, upwards to 45 degrees displaying a green or yellow light, and fully vertical also displaying a green light. In double light areas, the lower light of these signals stays red until a full Clear indication is shown. Therefore, these signals will show the same lights indicated by the Lower Quadrant Semaphore Distant and two-arm signals, that is, two greens for Clear, a green over a red for Caution and two reds for Stop.

=== Double light colour light ===
Example	Aspect	Indication	Meaning	Use	Speed Restriction
	Green / Green	Clear	Proceed		-
	Green / Flashing Yellow	Preliminary Medium	Proceed, expect the next signal to be at Medium	Not always provided	-
	Green / Yellow	Medium	Proceed, expect the next signal to be at Caution or Caution Turnout	Not always provided, but extremely common	-
	Green / Red	Caution	Proceed, expect the next signal to be at Stop		-
	Yellow / Yellow	Medium Turnout	Proceed on turnout route, expect the next signal to be at Caution or Caution Turnout	Used when train is either converging or diverging at junction.	Limited by turnout speed sign.
	Yellow / Red	Caution Turnout	Proceed on turnout route, expect the next signal to be at Stop	Used when train is either converging or diverging at junction.	Limited by turnout speed sign.
	Red / Red	Stop	Stop, do not proceed.		-
	Red / Red / Yellow	Calling On	Continue past signal for the purpose of shunting, prepared to stop before any obstruction.	Used for shunting purposes.	Restricted speed*
	Red / Red / Blinking Yellow	Shunt Ahead	Continue past signal for the purpose of shunting, but do not continue further into the block than necessary for shunting movement.	Used for shunting purposes, however extremely rare.	Restricted speed*
	Red / Red / Small Green	Low Speed	Continue past signal cautiously, expecting the next signal to be at Stop. The line immediately beyond the next signal may be occupied. If this signal has a train stop, a speed restriction of 25 km/h applies.	Only used in reduced overlap conditions.	25 km/h (where train stops are fitted)
	Red / Red / Green (Close Up)	Close Up	Differentiated from Low speed by having the green aspect in a separate case with "Close Up" written adjacent, and no speed restriction is provided.	Extremely rare, and has the same purpose as a Low Speed - to allow a train into the next block in reduced overlap conditions.	-
	Red / Red / Offset Yellow	Dead End	Train will continue through points into a Dead End siding. Light offset in direction of Siding.	Entrance into some Dead End Sidings	Restricted speed*

* Restricted Speed, just like 'Driving on-sight', specifically refers to a speed which will allow the train to stop short of any obstruction. No actual specific speed is specified as it varies based on the condition of the track and the visibility of the infrastructure ahead of the train.

Double Light Colour Light signalling is essentially a two-light multiple-aspect route signalling system, with aspects derived from the night indications of two-arm Home and Distant semaphore signals. This system was introduced in 1924 by C.B. Byles. Most of the Sydney and Newcastle metropolitan areas are equipped with Double Light Colour Light signals, in accordance with principles established during the tenure of Byles, although some of the signals in the outer suburbs has been replaced with Single Light Colour Light. Both systems have almost the same capabilities, with Double Light Colour Light only having a small advantage in aspect variety.

A basic double light colour light signal consists of two multiple lamp colour light signal heads, one above the other. In case of automatic signals, the upper and lower lights are vertically offset from each other or "staggered". Alternatively, the lower light may be directly below the upper light, like a controlled or semi-automatic signal. An 'A' plate is then fixed to the signal post or the tunnel wall adjacent to the signal to identify it as automatic. The term "semi-automatic" is no longer mentioned in official publications, although the signals still exist. They are classified according to their instantaneous mode of operation rather than capability, i.e. "controlled" or "automatic". Automatic signals in tunnels were originally identified by a white marker light, since the lights could not be staggered, but 'A' plates are now used. More commonly used in the City Circle is a blue 'A' light, which can, when required, extinguish and work as a controlled signal.

The simplest and original form of double light colour light signal provides three indications, that is Clear (green over green), Caution (green over red) and Stop (red over red). A fourth indication, known as Medium, is indicated by green over yellow. This equates to the "double yellow" in British multiple aspect signalling. The Medium indication was introduced in June 1926, three months after the first double yellow indication was used in the UK.

Facing junction signals may exhibit an upper yellow light where a diverging route is set. The yellow light was originally said to mean 'attention - proceed at medium speed' in accordance with a 1924 study by the Institute of Railway Signal Engineers in which Byles participated. However, 'medium speed' was never properly defined and the term has now been removed from the official rule book. Whilst the upper yellow light implies that a reduction in speed may be necessary, this is not consistent with conventional route signalling practice and shows clear influence from American colour light speed signalling, which the IRSE had studied in detail. The upper yellow light for diverging routes superseded the traditional route signalling practice of providing separate signal heads for each route at junctions.

The turnout indications are as follows: Caution Turnout (yellow over red), meaning proceed on diverging route, prepared to stop at the next signal (originally known as Medium Caution), and Medium Turnout (yellow over yellow), meaning proceed on diverging route, the next signal is exhibiting a proceed indication. The exhibition of an upper yellow light does not impose a specific speed restriction for approaching trains; it is still the responsibility of the driver to be familiar with the route and observe lineside speed boards relating to points and crossings. However, at some locations, speed control by train stops with timing circuitry as per the low speed indication (q.v.) does apply to the caution turnout indication. Oddly, upper yellow indications can also be seen at some converging junctions, at which only one speed-restricted route option is available, while signals at many other speed-restricted converging junctions feature an upper green light in accordance with normal route signalling practice. Junction signals are the most inconsistent and diverse in the NSW signalling system.

==== Reduced-overlap working and speed control ====
Original 1932 operation of Sydney's Speed Controlled Trips. Note: The Signal that allows the trains to proceed into the platform is a "Close Up" signal and conflicting sources say that the small lower light was either White, Yellow or Green. Note the Train stops also raised as the front of the train passed them, not as the rear does as depicted here

Projected traffic density warranted the introduction of additional signal indications. One of these was a small green light under the two main red lights of a Stop signal, indicating Low Speed. The Low Speed indication was provided in the Underground City Railway from its opening on 28 February 1932. The standard speed restriction imposed by train stops with the Low Speed indication was originally 17 mph. However, at some locations, the maximum permissible speed is as low as 5 mph, subject to local conditions.

Prior to the City Circle Resignalling of the 1990s, the western stations of the line were able to allow a following train into the platform on a Low Speed Signal (red over red over small green lights) and used the train stops spread along the platform to ensure that the arriving train would not get too close to the train still departing. This allowed these stations to deal with 42 trains per hour in either direction provided sub 40 second dwell times. The 1990s resignalling changed the older eastern stations to follow a similar operation, only these days the system will not let a following train in until the previous train has departed completely.

In the Underground city and Eastern Suburbs railway lines, a speed restriction of 30 mph also applies to the Caution indication. The train stops can be seen dropping as the signals step-up to Medium. Closely spaced 'multi home signals', similar to those used on the London Underground, are also a feature of the Underground City and Eastern Suburbs lines. Speed control by intermediate train stops, based on Byles' system, was introduced on the London Underground following the accident at Moorgate on 28 February 1975, in which 43 people were killed. Varying numbers of intermediate train stops are spread out between signals, most notably at underground platforms on the City Circle and Eastern Suburbs Railway, but also at some above ground locations. Intermediate train stops are controlled by timing circuitry to enforce predetermined maximum speeds, which are lower towards the signal at stop. Where multiple intermediate train stops are provided, control of the last one before the signal at stop is typically configured to enforce a maximum speed of approximately 5 km/h.

The sequence of aspects on the approach to a preceding train in areas where the Low Speed indication is in use is as follows: Clear, Medium, Caution, Low Speed, Stop. In rare cases, the Medium indication will be exhibited at two consecutive signals. At some locations, the Low Speed indication will only be exhibited under reduced overlap conditions (e.g. owing to the presence of a train ahead). Under such a configuration, the sequence of aspects is Clear, Medium, Caution, Stop, provided the full overlap is available.

An additional subsidiary indication below a stop signal is the Close Up. This appears similar to the Low Speed indication, except that the subsidiary green light is provided in a separate lamp case below a plate labelled "CLOSE UP". Speed control does not apply to the Close Up indication, which is manually selected by the Signaller in most cases and indicates that the section is clear but the station or junction ahead is blocked. Close Up signals are equivalent to the British warning ("W") signal for restricted acceptance where less than the normal overlap is available. Signals fitted with a Close Up lamp case are increasingly rare.

==== Preliminary medium indications and turnout repeaters ====
A fifth main aspect, Preliminary Medium, is available, with a pulsating yellow light beneath an upper green. It is often used before a Medium indication to provide additional notice of the need to reduce speed for a facing junction, the equivalent of the British flashing double yellow. The typical sequence of aspects on the approach to a junction where Preliminary Medium is in use is as follows: Clear, Preliminary Medium (with or without directional indicator), Medium, Medium Turnout or Caution Turnout at the junction signal. At some locations, Preliminary Medium may be exhibited at two consecutive signals. Many automatic signals that are not near junctions can also display the Preliminary Medium indication to give additional warning to freight trains about upcoming red signals.

Directional indicators have been introduced to resolve the ambiguity that may arise when a medium aspect (green over yellow) can precede either a caution aspect (green over red) or one of the turnout aspects (yellow over red/yellow). The indicator is provided at the signal(s) in rear of a junction signal. When illuminated it displays a white bar, inclined at 45 degrees to the left or right, placed above the main signal heads. The bar is not lit when the next signal applies to the straight route, but is illuminated when the next signal applies to the turnout. The white indicator is proved to be alight before the yellow is displayed.

At high speed junctions, turnout indications are no longer provided. Instead, the signal in rear of the junction signal is provided with a directional indicator. The junction signal is provided with a route indicator, and exhibits the least-restrictive straight route indication permitted by track circuit occupancy.

===== Double light colour light repeaters =====
Repeaters in the form of Double Light Colour Light signals are provided at some locations in the metropolitan area. These "repeaters" are unusual in that they do not replicate the indication of the stop signals to which they apply. Instead, they are wired like separate block signals or Distant signals. For instance, the repeater will be at green over red when the signal to which it applies is at Stop. The red over red indication will only be exhibited when the line between the repeater and the stop signal is occupied, and is treated as a Permissive Stop.

=== Single light colour light ===
Example	Aspect	Indication	Meaning	Use	Speed Restriction
	Green	Clear	Proceed		-
	Blinking Yellow	Medium	Proceed, expect the next signal to be at Caution or Caution Turnout	Not always provided	-
	Yellow	Caution	Proceed, expect the next signal to be at Stop		-
	Red / Blinking Diagonal line of Yellow lights	Medium Turnout	Proceed on turnout route, expect the next signal to be at Caution or Caution Turnout. Yellow lights will be angled up in the direction of the turnout.	Used when train is either converging or diverging at junction.	Limited by turnout speed sign.
	Red / Diagonal line of Yellow lights	Caution Turnout	Proceed on turnout route, expect the next signal to be at Stop. Yellow lights will be angled up in the direction of the turnout.	Used when train is either converging or diverging at junction.	Limited by turnout speed sign.
	Red / Red	Stop	Stop, do not proceed		-
	Red / Red / Yellow	Calling On	Continue past signal for the purpose of shunting, prepared to stop before any obstruction.	Used for shunting purposes.	Restricted speed*
	Red / Red / Blinking Yellow	Shunt Ahead	Continue past signal for the purpose of shunting, but do not continue further into the block than necessary for shunting movement.	Used for shunting purposes, however extremely rare.	Restricted speed*
	Red / Red / Small Green	Low Speed	Continue past signal cautiously, expecting the next signal to be at Stop. The line immediately beyond the next signal may be occupied. If this signal has a train stop, a speed restriction of 25 km/h applies.	Only used in reduced overlap conditions	25 km/h (where train stops are fitted)
	Red / Red / Green (Close Up)	Close Up	Differentiated from Low speed by having the green aspect in a separate case with "Close Up" written adjacent, and no speed restriction is provided.	Extremely rare, and has the same purpose as a Low Speed - to allow a train into the next block in reduced overlap conditions.	-
	Blinking White	Proceed into Dark Territory	Train will proceed into area controlled by alternative signalling method.	Dark Territory	-
	Red / Diagonal line of White lights	Diverge into Dark Territory	Train will diverge into area controlled by alternative signalling method, White lights will be angled in direction of diverging route.	Dark Territory	Limited by turnout speed sign.
	Red / Red / Offset Yellow	Dead End	Train will continue through points into a Dead End siding. Light offset in direction of Siding.	Dead End sidings	Restricted speed*

* Restricted Speed, just like 'Driving on-sight', specifically refers to a speed which will allow the train to stop short of any obstruction. No actual specific speed is specified as it varies based on the condition of the track and the visibility of the infrastructure ahead of the train.

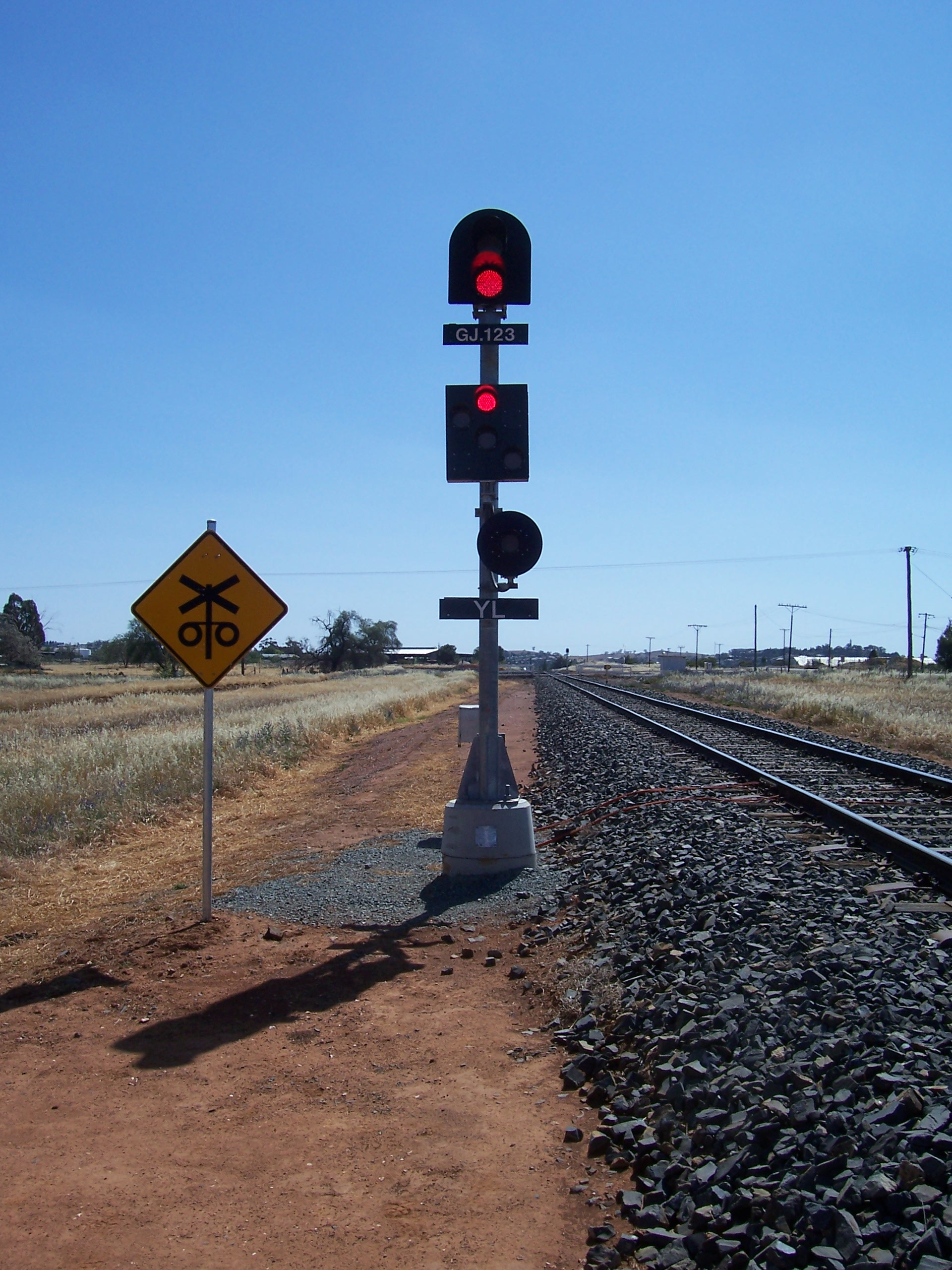
NSW single light signal with band of lights and shunt aspects

With the replacement of older signals in areas with less traffic, Single Light Colour Light signals were introduced in the 1950s by D.J. Vernon, Signal Engineer. This system is derived directly from British multiple-aspect signalling, with American influence in the form of a marker light. Using a single green light for Clear and a single yellow light for Caution, these signals exhibit a single red light with a smaller lower red "marker" light for Stop. Turnout indications can be provided with three yellow lights at an angle of 45 degrees under a red light in the main signal head. The fourth indication, Medium, which equates to the British Preliminary Caution, is a flashing or pulsating yellow light.

Originally, a permanently illuminated white marker light was positioned beneath the main colour light head in lieu of the red marker light. The caution turnout indication was a single yellow in the main head over three white lights at an angle of 45 degrees. The red marker light was introduced from 1965. The majority of early single light colour light signals had either been replaced or retrofitted with red marker lights, by 2000.

Some Upper Quadrant Semaphore signals were adapted as Single Light Colour Light signals giving the same colour indications while retaining the arm. The sequence of indications of Single Light Colour Light signals is one green light for Clear, one yellow light for Caution, one red light with a lower smaller red light for Stop. The last Upper Quadrant Semaphore Single Light signal was on the Up South Main Line at Moss Vale, which was replaced in 2007 when Moss Vale and Moss Vale Junction were resignalled, resulting in the closure of local signal boxes at those locations.

=== Shunting Signals ===
Shunt signals are provided at locations where only shunt movements can occur, for example to reverse over a crossover or to enter a siding. They are used in both single and double colour light territory.

Example	Aspect	Indication	Meaning	Usage Example
	2 Red Lights	Stop	Stop, do not proceed.	
	Yellow Light	Shunt Proceed	Proceed at a speed at restricted speed (a speed which will allow the train to stop short of any obstruction). Any points are locked (and set for the indicated route, if a route indicator is fitted), however there is assurance that the track ahead is clear. Proceed only as far as necessary for the shunt movement.	Train comes from the bottom left and stops clear of the crossover. A shunt signal authorises the movement across the crossover and onto the right line.
	Green Light	Running Proceed	Signal not in use, continue following the indication of the previous running signal. Only intermediate shunting signals (those between two running signals facing the same way) have this aspect, to allow for mainline (non-shunting) movements.	Train comes from the bottom left, authorised by a prior running signal to go straight through to the top left. A signal is provided to allow shunting over the crossover and then reversing, however this is not required, so the signal shows a green light.

== Queensland ==
=== Queensland Railway Signal Aspects ===
Example	Aspect	Indication	Meaning	Use	Speed Restriction
	Green	Clear	Proceed	-	
	Yellow / Yellow	Preliminary Caution	Proceed, but expect to see the next signal at Caution	Only provided in Brisbane Suburban Area (BSA)	-
	Yellow	Caution	Proceed, but be ready to stop at the next signal		-
	Red	Stop	Stop, do not proceed		0
	Red / Two Diagonal White lights	Shunt	Travel as far as the LOS (Limit of Shunt Board), at restricted speed max 25 km/h obey all intervening stop signals. Be prepared to stop at obstruction.	Entrance or exit from yards and other non-mainline movements.	25 km/h
	Blinking Yellow	Special Caution	Proceed at no more than 40 km/h, but be ready to stop at the next signal	Route in advance may be set against you or shunting may be occurring on adjacent tracks.	40 km/h
	Red / Two Diagonal White lights (Call On)	Call on	(Differentiated from Shunt by having "C" written on casing.) Continue past the signal at no greater than 25 km/h and expect to stop short of train in front.	Used to permit a train to move into the same block as the one in front.	25 km/h (can change)
&	Red with Yellow light offset to one side	Diverge into Siding	Train should pass over junction into siding after signal, expect next signal to be at Danger, and the Yellow light will be offset in the same direction as siding.	Used only on old passing loops; superseded.	Limited by turnout speed sign.
	Blinking Green	Proceed into Dark Territory	Train will proceed into area controlled by alternative signalling method.		

Queensland's signalling system has been heavily influenced by the British signalling practices. DTC (Direct Traffic Control) is used in lower volume regional networks, however some of the Queensland rail network is still controlled by legacy signalling systems such as Staff and Ticket.

The system contains the main four aspects from British Rail signalling; Clear, Preliminary Caution, Caution and Danger. It also uses White lights to display Shunt Signals. The variance in QLD's system is with the Special Caution indication. This means the same thing as Caution just with an additional 40 km/h speed restriction. The signal is used when the overlap past the next signal would not be safe to enter, like being occupied by a train, or a conflicting junction. It means almost the same thing as "Low Speed" in Sydney's signalling system, there are just no speed proving systems and the speed limit is 40, not 25 km/h.

QLD makes use of Junction indicators at the signals protecting junctions. These are a separate display of white lights above the main signal head that are angled in the direction of the turnout; they can also be of a theatre display type which shows a letter or multiple letters which refer to the location that the train is being directed to.

In order to provide warning of upcoming turnouts, QLD makes use of Dynamic Speed Indicators, these are boxes below the main set of lights which contain yellow text. The text will tell the driver what speed they are allow to pass the next signal, the presence of the text will warn them of an upcoming turnout. The usual speeds that can be displayed are: 25, 40, 50 and 80.

=== QLD Dwarf Signals ===
Example	Aspect	Indication	Meaning	Use	Speed Restriction
	Red and White Lights	Stop	Stop, do not proceed	Non-mainline movements	0
	2 White Lights spaced diagonally	Proceed (Restricted)	Travel as far as the LOS (Limit of Shunt Board) or the next signal at stop, at no faster than 25 km/h until past the next signal. Be prepared to stop at obstruction.	Non-mainline movements	25 km/h

== South Australia ==
South Australia uses two primary forms of signalling. Nearly all signal boxes in South Australia have now been closed, with most rail traffic being coordinated through centralised traffic control systems, either under Australian Rail Track Corporation control from Mile End or Adelaide Metro control from Adelaide. Where these two networks interface, such as at the former Goodwood level crossing or at Torrens Junction (both now grade separated), control is usually from ARTC after release from Adelaide Metro. Despite the almost uniform CTC control some signal boxes still exist, such as Dry Creek South although they are not normally switched in.

=== Speed signalling ===
Before 1988, signalling in the metropolitan area was three-position speed signalling, similar to the Victorian system. All mainline signals have two signal 'heads' (originally upper quadrant semaphore arms but now colour light, LED or searchlight), both are always lit. The aspects shown depend on the allowable speed for the route set. If the route was for Normal speed, the 'proceed' component of the indication is conveyed by the top head, if the move is for Medium speed (35 km/h, such as when entering a loop or siding), the 'proceed' component of the indication is conveyed by the lower head. The colours displayed by either depended on how many blocks ahead were clear; green if two or more blocks were clear and yellow if only one was clear (i.e. the next signal showed Stop).

Hence the aspects (and indications) are:

Example	Aspect	Indication	Meaning	Use	Speed Restriction
	Red / Red	Stop	Stop, do not proceed		0
	Green / Red	Clear Normal Speed	Proceed at normal speed.		-
	Yellow / Red	Normal Speed Warning	Proceed at normal speed, but be ready to stop at the next signal		-
	Yellow / Green	Reduce to Medium Speed	Proceed at normal speed, but slow down to medium speed (35 km/h) before the next signal	Used before "Medium speed" signals	None, but prepare to reduce to 35 km/h
	Red / Green	Clear Medium Speed	Proceed at medium speed (No more than 35 km/h)	Used when train is required to reduce speed.	35 km/h
	Red / Yellow	Caution Medium Speed	Proceed at medium speed (No more than 35 km/h), but be ready to stop at the next signal	Used when train is required to reduce speed.	35 km/h
	Red / Red / Yellow	Shunt	Proceed past signal on sight, expecting to stop short of possible obstruction.	Used for shunting movements	15 km/h

'Reduce to Medium speed' (35 km/h) is used when the next signal displays one of the Medium speed indications. If the top light (normal speed) only displays red (such as departing from a crossing loop), it is only fitted with a red aspect. If the lower light (medium speed) only displays red, it is often replaced with a red reflector in place of a red light.

Many signals on the ARTC controlled network are "approach lit", meaning that they are normally extinguished, but a train on the track circuit(s) in advance of the signal will cause it to illuminate. This is both to save power at remote locations without mains power supply, and an effort to reduce vandalism.

==== Dwarf signals ====
Dwarf signals can be used to show Low speed aspects at signals where main line aspects are not needed. These were originally upper quadrant disc signals but are now all of the colour light or searchlight variety. The aspects (and indications) are:

Example	Aspect	Indication	Meaning	Use	Speed Restriction
	Red or Purple Light	Stop	Stop, do not proceed	Non-mainline movements	0
	Yellow Light	Low Speed Caution	Continue to next signal on sight, at no faster than 15 km/h until past the next signal. Be prepared to stop at obstruction.	Non-mainline movements	15 km/h
	Green Light	Clear Low Speed	Continue to next signal, at no faster than 15 km/h until past the next signal. Line is clear to next signal, which is at Proceed.		15 km/h

==== Permissive vs Absolute ====
Signals are divided into Permissive and Absolute signals. Absolute signals cannot be passed at Stop without permission from the signaller or controller, whereas Permissive signals at Stop can be passed after having stopped for a one-minute waiting period. Absolute signals can be identified by the fact that the two lights are vertically aligned, whereas with Permissive signals they are vertically off-set (staggered on different sides of the post). Dwarf signals are always Absolute.

=== Suburban network ===
Example	Aspect	Indication	Meaning	Use	Speed Restriction
	Green	Clear	Proceed, expect the next signal to be at Normal Speed		-
	Yellow	Caution	Proceed, expect the next signal to be at Stop		-
	Blinking Yellow	Reduce to Medium Speed	Proceed at normal speed, but slow down to medium speed (35 km/h) before the next signal		-
&	Green with Route indicator	Clear Medium Speed	Proceed at medium speed (No more than 35 km/h)	Diverging Route	35 km/h
&	Yellow with Route indicator	Caution Medium Speed	Proceed at medium speed (No more than 35 km/h), but be ready to stop at the next signal	Diverging Route	35 km/h
	Red	Stop	Stop, do not proceed		0
	Red / Two Diagonal White lights	Proceed at low Speed	Continue to next signal on sight, at no faster than 15 km/h until past next signal. Be prepared to stop at obstruction.		15 km/h

=== Adelaide Suburban Dwarf Signals ===
Example	Aspect	Indication	Meaning	Use	Speed Restriction
	Red and White Lights	Stop	Stop, do not proceed	Non-mainline movements	0
	2 White Lights spaced diagonally	Proceed (Restricted)	Continue to next signal on sight, at no faster than 15 km/h until past the next signal. Be prepared to stop at obstruction.	Non-mainline movements	15 km/h

In 1988 the Adelaide Metro lines were resignalled with the opening of the Adelaide control centre. This system uses UK colour light signals to display the standard speed signalling aspects. The effect is to give both a route and a speed indication to drivers. There are three basic aspects: red for stop, yellow for caution and green for clear. A reduce to medium speed aspect is also used to give early warning of a divergence, and is given by a flashing yellow light. All aspects are indicated with colour light signals. Despite this re-signalling, some parts of the TransAdelaide network still use the original 3-position speed signalling (such as the Dry Creek to Port Adelaide line).

There is also a low speed aspect indicated by a lunar-white position-light signal mounted below the main head. It shows two lunar-white lights at 45 degrees (to mimic an upper-quadrant semaphore) to indicate proceed at low speed. These position light signals are also used for dwarf signals and in this case they can also display 'stop' as a red light and lunar-white light in a horizontal row.

Medium speed routes (diverging routes) on running signals are indicated by a row of five lunar-white lights angled in the direction of divergence, called a Junction Route Indicator. If multiple routes are to be signalled, several rows may be used.

Permissive signals are indicated by a circular 'P' plate offset below the signal head and Absolute by a square 'A' plate directly below the signal head. As with three-position signalling, dwarf (low speed) signals are always absolute. An 'A' plate in New South Wales or Victoria means the signal is automatic and therefore a Permissive signal, which is again a source of conflicting meaning between the differing signalling systems.

In the Adelaide station yard Theatre-style route indicators are used on both running signals and shunt signals; platform numbers for 'up' trains and route through the yard for 'down' trains. The down indicators have changed over time. At present, the indicators for Down Trains show the following indications:

- SM-Seaford Main (Previously SS-South Suburban Line),
- BM-Belair Main (Previously SM-South Main Line),
- PM-Port Main Line,
- NM-North Main Line,
- RD-Railcar Depot (No longer used),
- SY-Stabling Siding (No longer used),
- NY-North Yard.

== Tasmania ==
The railways of Tasmania predominantly follow the United Kingdom railway signalling system. Routes use lineside signals to control the passage of trains within the Tasmanian rail network.

== Victoria ==
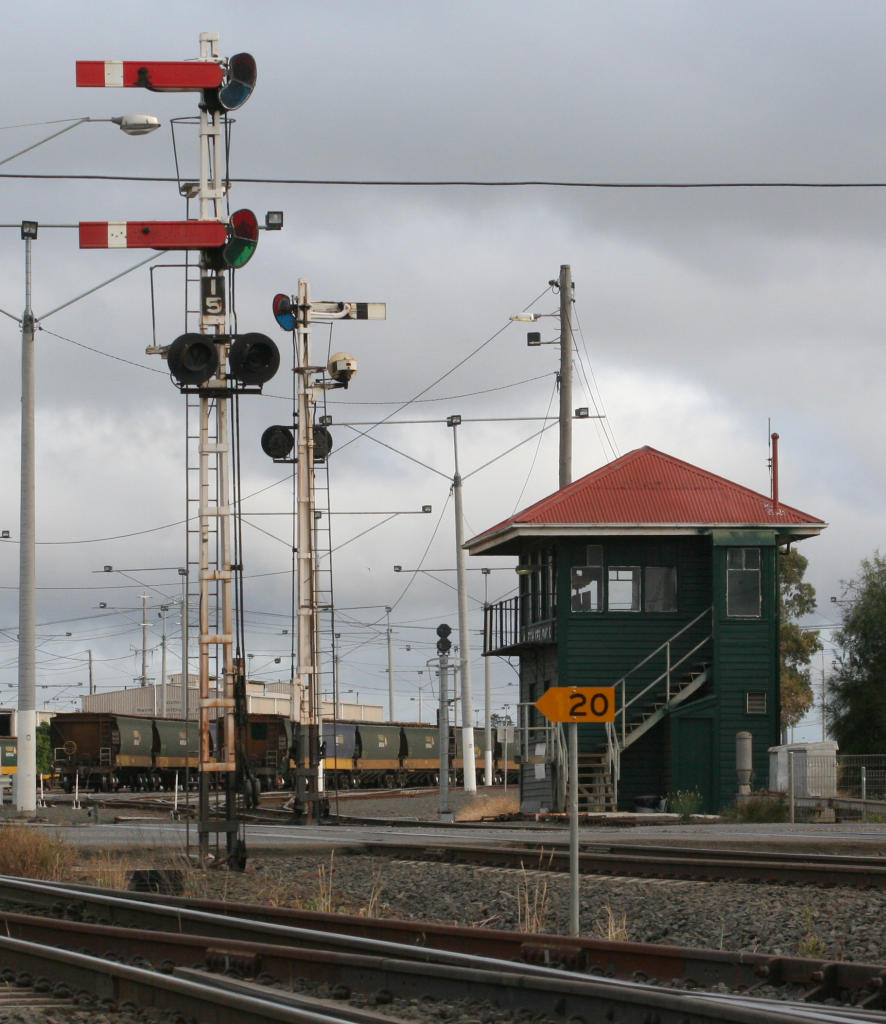
Mechanical 2 position semaphore signalling at North Geelong

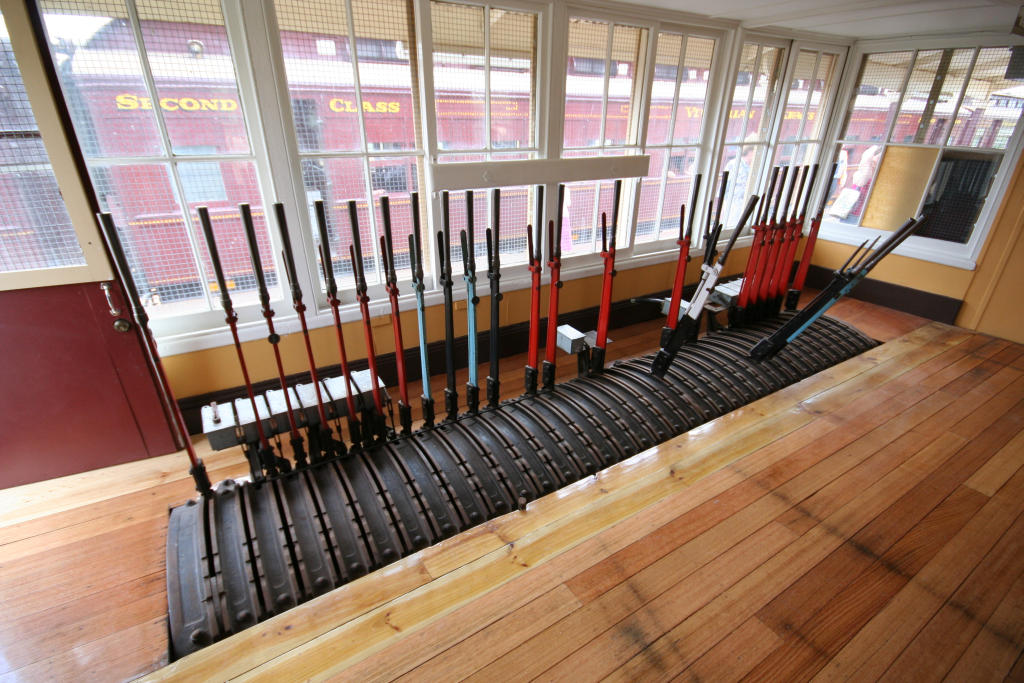
Mechanical interlocking frame for signal control at Avenel

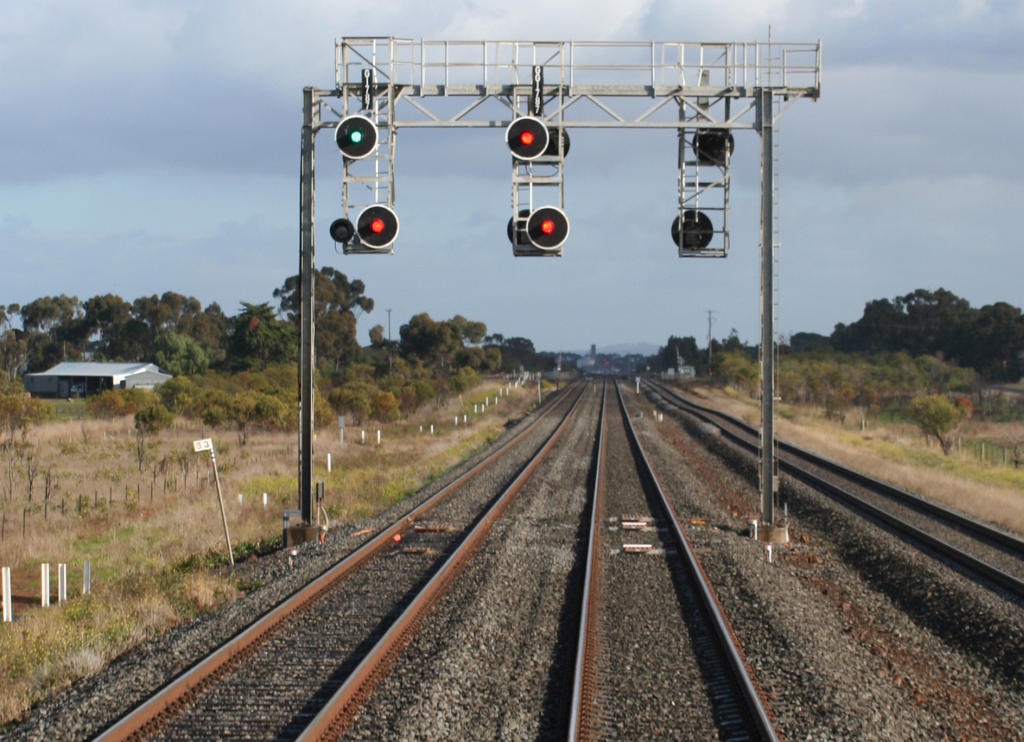
Modern LED colour light 3 position signalling

The railways of Victoria use a mix of railway signalling practices: British route signalling (known as two position signalling) and US speed signalling (known as three position signalling). Two position and three position signals can be mixed at one location. Running three position signals have two continuously lit lights vertically arranged. Running two position signals generally have only one continuously lit light on each signal post or doll, however it is possible for there to be multiple continuously lit vertically arranged lights. The consequence of this is that it theoretically possible to confuse two and three position signals; this risk is managed by limiting what aspects are allowed at a particular site.

Two position signalling is still in use today. Each signal is either a "Starting", "Home" or a "Distant" Signal, where Starting and Home Signals can display a Red aspect that tell a driver they must stop, and Distant Signals display a "Yellow" aspect that warns the driver that any starting home signals ahead are displaying a stop aspect. All signals can display a green aspect that means "Clear". There is no provision for speed signalling in two position areas.

Junction direction indications are given by displaying two aspects side by side on the same signal mast. Only the signal to the same side as the selected route will display the relevant aspect, while the other will be Red.

=== Victorian Two Aspect Signals Indications ===
Example	Aspect	Indication	Meaning	Use	Speed Restriction
	Red	Stop	Stop, do not proceed	Only provided on Home or Starting Signals	
	Green	Clear	Proceed		-
	Yellow	Caution	Proceed, but be ready to stop at a signal within station limits ahead	Only provided on Distant Signals	-
	Red / Yellow	Calling on	Proceed past signal, expecting to stop short of obstruction. (Diverging for a siding will have a "Siding" sign affixed to post). Many Semaphore Signals display multiple Shunt disks on a mast, each corresponding to a different route and therefore do not have the main signal head.	Shunting Movements	

Two aspect signals display route diversions in an unusual way (by modern standards). Normally two or more signal heads are placed on the same mast (this can often mean one is placed above the other; in which case the upper signal refers to the leftmost route, and the lower to the right most route) and the route they correspond to is designated by the signalling diagrams of the track section. Only one of these signal heads can be given any indication (other than red) at a time.

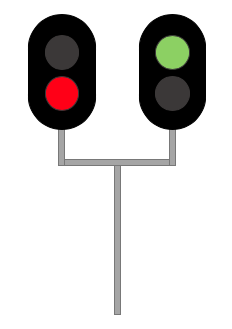
An example of a Diverge Right Signal from Victoria

Two aspect signalling also makes use of the "Warning", "Reduce to Medium Speed" and "Proceed" repeaters mentioned in the Three aspect section, these signals being primarily used on the border between two and three position signal areas, to give drivers an indication of the aspect of the next three position signal.

=== Two Aspect Dwarf Signals ===
Example	Aspect	Indication	Meaning	Use	Speed Restriction
	Red	Stop	Stop, do not proceed	Non-mainline movements	0
	Green	Proceed	Continue to next signal on sight, at no faster than 15 km/h until you pass the next signal. Be prepared to stop at obstruction.	Non-mainline movements	15 km/h

Semaphore signals were used on the very first railway lines, but only a bare minimum was provided as the time interval system was relied upon instead. The first interlocking of signals to protect trains was provided in 1874, as before this time conflicting moves could be made. The design of the signals also progressed, with the disc type siding signals first introduced in 1885, and the lower quadrant somersault type main line signals adopted in 1887, both of which are still in use today. Green was not adopted as the All Right colour until 1898, with white being used before this time. Red was the usually colour of all signal arms, until yellow was chosen as the colour for distant signals in 1926, with full adoption made in 1930. Colour light signals first appeared in 1918, and by 1924 they were the standard for new installations.

The safeworking of trains between stations on the early lines was time interval working, where a train would be allowed to leave a given time after the train before it. With heavier traffic this method became unsafe, with Staff and Ticket working on single lines adopted from 1873, and telegraph block working from 1878 on double lines. Both of these systems ensured that only one train would be in a section of track at one time. Telegraphic block working was then replaced with Winters Block working between 1883 and 1888, a system that is a predecessor of the Double Line Block system which is still used today. Later years saw variations made to the Staff and Ticket system, with busier lines provided with Electric Staff working which provided greater safely when more trains ran.

Heavier suburban traffic on the Melbourne network saw a greater strain on the block working then used, which required a large number of staffed signalboxes to enable trains to run close together. As a result, it was decided to adopt power signalling under the Automatic Block System (ABS) of safeworking, where the presence of trains automatically control the signals after them, providing a safe distance between trains. Introduced from 1915, the system was based on American speed signalling practice with GRS2A upper quadrant mechanical signals with two arms able to indicate up to 5 different speed aspects to train drivers. These signals were later replaced by colour light signals which are the standard today, but the old mechanical style remained until 2001.

A variant of the Automatic Block System, Automatic and Track Control (ATC) has since been introduced, which provides the same benefits as ABS on single lines of track, while still ensuring only one train in a section at a time. Centralised Traffic Control was also introduced in the 1960s on the new standard gauge line to Albury, and then on the main interstate line to Adelaide, allowing trains to be directed from a distance.

Today little mechanical signalling remains, with local signal boxes controlling signals abolished from many areas as part of the Regional Fast Rail project. Today the suburban network and busier regional lines use variants of Automatic Block Signalling, while quieter lines use the Train Staff and Ticket or Train Order systems of safeworking. Train protection has also progressed, with the Train Protection & Warning System also introduced on major passenger lines.

=== Victorian Three Aspect Signal indications ===
All mainline signals have two signal 'heads' (originally upper quadrant semaphore arms but now colour light, LED or searchlight), both are always lit. The aspects shown depend on the allowable speed for the route set. If the route was for Normal speed, the 'proceed' component of the indication is conveyed by the top head, if the move is for Medium speed (40 km/h, 65 or 80 km/h if a '65' or '80' marker is displayed with the medium speed signal), the 'proceed' component of the indication is conveyed by the lower head. The colours displayed by either depended on how many blocks ahead were clear; green if two or more blocks were clear and yellow if only one was clear (i.e. the next signal showed Stop).

Example	Aspect	Indication	Meaning	Use	Speed Restriction
	Red / Red	Stop	Stop, do not proceed		0
	Green / Red	Clear Normal Speed	Proceed at normal speed		Line speed
	Yellow / Red	Normal Speed Warning	Proceed at normal speed, but be ready to stop at the next signal		Line speed
	Extinguished	CBTC Movement Authority	Proceed according to CBTC in-cab signal	Used for territories equipped with mixed signalling (conventional and CBTC).	-
	Yellow / Green	Reduce to Medium speed	Proceed at normal speed, but slow down to medium speed before the next signal (Repeating signal)	Used before "Medium speed" signals	None, but reduce to 40 km/h unless a 65 or 80 marker is displayed; then reduce to 65 km/h or 80 km/h respectively
	Red / Green	Clear Medium Speed	Proceed at medium speed	Used when train is required to reduce speed.	40 km/h unless 65 or 80 marker is displayed; then 65 km/h or 80 km/h respectively
	Red / Yellow	Medium Speed Warning	Proceed at medium speed, but be ready to stop at the next signal	Used when train is required to reduce speed.	40 km/h (the 65/80 marker can not be displayed with this indication)
	Red / Red / Yellow	Low Speed Caution	Proceed at no more than 15 km/h, the line ahead may be occupied, be prepared to stop short of any obstruction	Used for shunting movements	15 km/h
	Yellow / Yellow	Warning	Proceed, but be ready to stop at the next signal (Repeating signal)	Used most often on the transition from two aspect territory or unsignalled territory to three aspect territory.	-
	Green / Yellow	Proceed	Proceed, the next signal is at normal speed (Repeating signal)	Used most often on the transition from two aspect territory or unsignalled territory to three aspect territory.	-

=== Victorian Three Aspect Dwarf Signals ===
Example	Aspect	Indication	Meaning	Use	Speed Restriction
	Red, Blue or Purple Light	Stop	Stop, do not proceed	Non-mainline movements	0
	Yellow Light	Low Speed Caution	Proceed at no more than 15 km/h, the line ahead may be occupied, be prepared to stop short of any obstruction	Non-mainline movements	15 km/h
	Green Light	Clear Low Speed	Proceed at no faster than 15 km/h to the next signal, which is not at Stop. The line to the next signal is clear.	Non-mainline movements	15 km/h

== Western Australia ==
Western Australia's Pilbara mining railways will not be dealt with here as there is a lack of information due to the private nature of the railways.

Example	Aspect	Indication	Meaning	Use	Speed Restriction
	Green	Clear	Proceed, expect the next signal to be at Proceed	mainline and others	-highest permitted speed
	Yellow	Caution	Proceed, but be ready to stop at the next signal	mainline and others	slow down to a speed to allow a stop at next signal
	Red	Stop	Stop, do not proceed	mainline and others	0, do not move
	Red / Yellow	Shunt	Continue to next signal on sight, at no faster than 25 km/h until past next signal. Be prepared to stop at obstruction.	mainline and other	25 km/h

=== Perth Dwarf Signals ===
Example	Aspect	Name	Meaning	Use	Speed Restriction
	Red	Stop	Stop, do not proceed	Non-mainline movements	no movement
	Yellow	Caution Proceed	Continue to next signal on sight, at no faster than 25 km/h until past the next signal. Be prepared to stop at obstruction.	Non-mainline movements	25 km/h

The rail network of the Western Australian Government Railways (1890–1976), Westrail (1975–2000) and Arc Infrastructure (2000-present) consists today of Train Orders and Centralised Train Control.

In the southern half of Western Australia, the railways were all 1067mm gauge and there was no standard gauge rail, apart from the Trans-Australian Railway running from the east to Kalgoorlie.

In the 1960s the Commonwealth and Western Australian Government decided to gauge convert the Eastern Goldfields and Eastern lines from Kalgoorlie to Perth to standard gauge. The Leonora and Esperance were also gauge converted to standard gauge.

Staff and Ticket were the primary form of signalling safe working system used in Western Australia apart from major yards and main lines such as the Eastern Gline. This has been replaced with Train Orders and no staff and ticket exists in Western Australian and hasn't for more than 20 years.

In 1967, the standard gauge was completed between Kalgoorlie and Kwinana, with a dual gauge section built in the Avon Valley between Avon Yard and Kwinana. From Avon Yard to Kalgoorlie this is known as the Single Line Automatic Signalling System using absolute block. Absolute block is used all throughout Western Australia with exception to the Pilbara Railways as no information has been attained to cover that area.

A three aspect colour light signal is used in the Western Australian standard gauge railway and this system is almost completely uniform through the network in automatic signalling territory (narrow gauge as well). When a crossing loop is reached, a Home Signal will have a signal for each, with the crossing segment signal being 45 degrees beneath the main line signal and in the direction of the turnout. For example, if the turnout was a right-hand the crossing signal would be on the right side below the main signal. Either signal is taken as the Home signal even if taking the loop. Each has an individual number and letter.

All branch lines in Western Australia use Train Orders, formerly staff and ticket. Train Orders does utilise a signal at the entrance and the exit of the territory.

The Western Australian system is very simple to understand but the complexities of leading position lights and other odd attachments to signalling apparatus have been either eradicated or were never part of it. Switchlocks are used to exit mainline CTC territory for sidings, such as CBH yard terminals on the Standard Gauge. The Train Controller must release the switchlock thus interlocking the signals to stop and this is similar to Queensland.

Points on mainlines in Western Australia are not equipped with leading position light signalling. In fact there is no need for this type of signals as it is just an added cost. This saves money on equipment and also improves the driver's workload by only having to pay attention to critical information during critical phases of approaching signals.

There are simple yellow light shunt signals on signal posts which authorise movements to the next obstruction (vehicle) or signal. An accident occurred at Hines Hill in 1996 where a train entered the mainline from the East at high speed on a slow speed shunt signal indication and due to the driver not maintaining control of the train it collided with an Eastbound Westrail (see Hines Hill train collision) freight train after it had passed Departure Signal at Danger. The driver of the National Rail train had not reduced the speed of his train and the train controller unusually called the slow speed shunt signal, not meant for mainline operations.

There are no speed signals in Western Australia's freight system operated by Arc Infrastructure and they are either Approach, Outer Home, Home, Departure and Starting signals. Perth's urban passenger network is operated by the Public Transport Authority and the Rules are identical to that of the freight, with a few minor differences. One of them is the use of Station Limits boards similar to that used in Train Order territory.
