= Electro-pneumatic =

Electro-pneumatic may refer to

- Electro-pneumatic control, control systems built with electrical components to control pneumatic components
- Electro-pneumatic action, a control system by the mean of air pressure for pipe organs
- Railway brake#Electropneumatic brakes
