= Buckinbah =

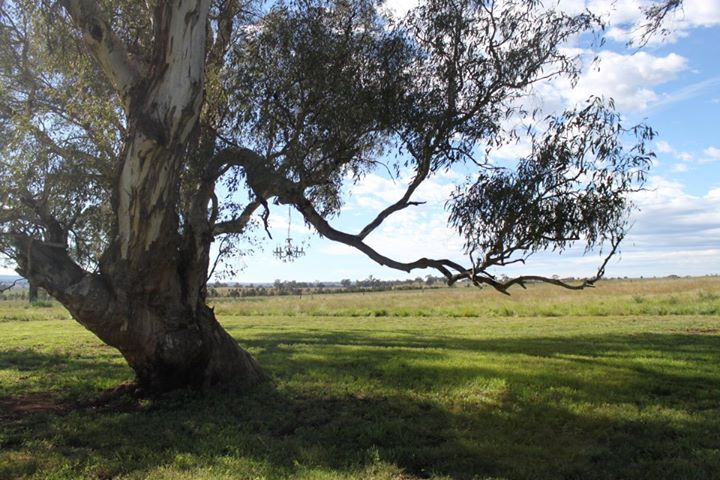
Buckinbah, Yeoval NSW in Spring

Buckinbah Station is located on the edge of the Yeoval, New South Wales township that was the first home to Banjo Paterson.

Yeoval was initially known as Buckinbah in the 1860s until the name was changed in 1882.

It remains today as mixed farming land however the original property has been split up between several owners. The present Buckinbah homestead was built between 1915 and 1917.
