= Electrostatic–pneumatic activation =

Electrostatic–pneumatic activation is an actuation method for shaping thin membranes for microelectromechanical and microoptoelectromechanical systems. This method benefits from operation at high speed and low power consumption. It can also cause large deflection on thin membranes. Electrostatic-pneumatic MEMS devices usually consist of two membranes with a sealed cavity in between. One membrane-calling actuator deflects into the cavity by electrostatic pressure to compress air and increase air pressure. Elevated pressure pushes the other membrane and causes a dome shape. With direct electrostatic actuation on the membrane, a concave shape is achieved.

This method is used in MEMS deformable mirrors to create convex and concave mirrors. Electrostatic-pneumatic actuation can double maximum displacement of a thin membrane compared to only electrostatic actuated membrane.

Moreover, mechanical advantage is possible by use of electrostatic-pneumatic actuation. Since the cavity is filled with air, mechanical amplification is lower than hydraulic machinery with a non-compressible fluid.

== See also ==
- Electro-pneumatic control
