= Yeoval, New South Wales =

Yeoval
- Town
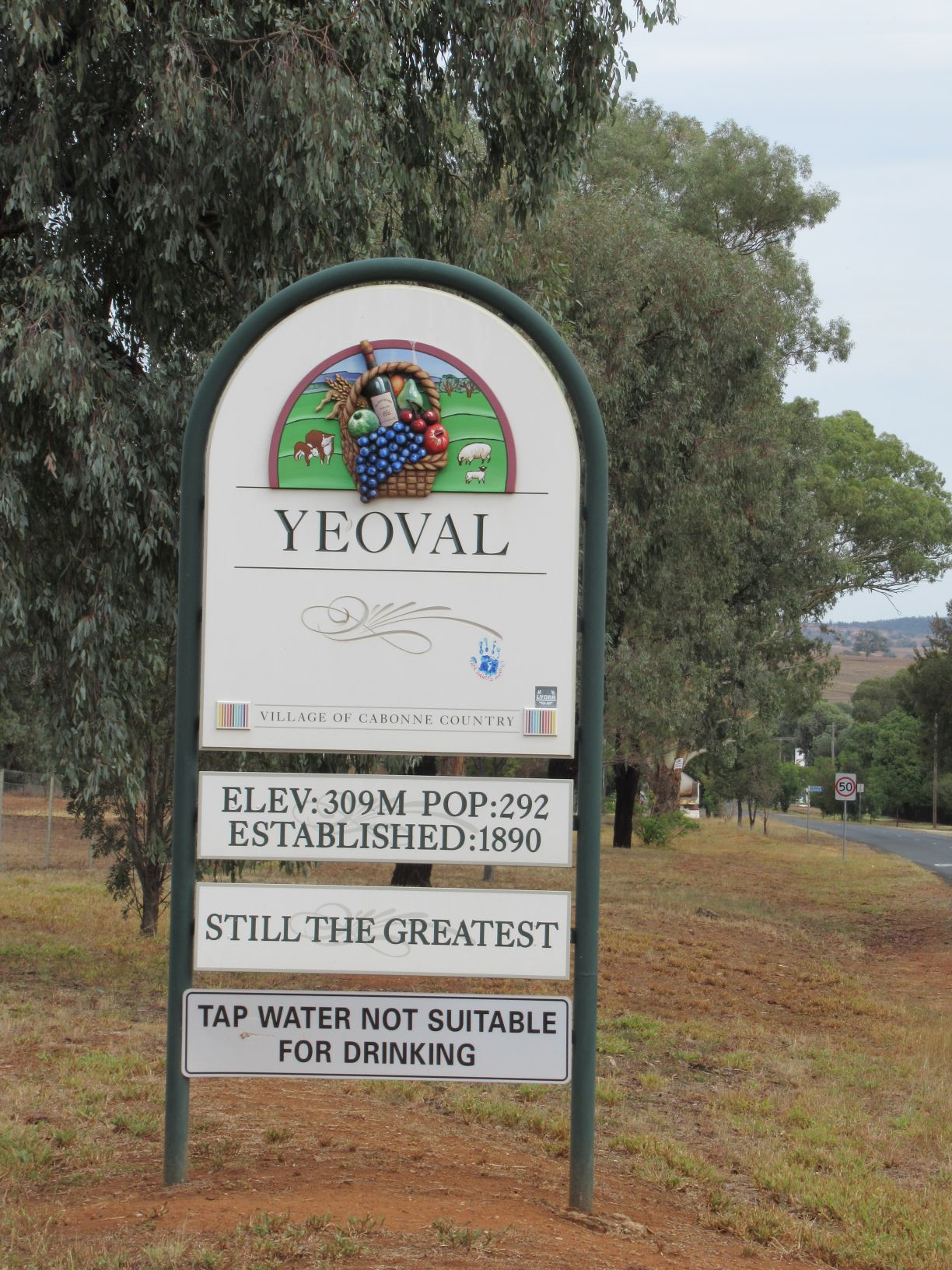
- Yeoval entrance sign

- Coordinates: 32°45′S 148°39′E
- Country: Australia
- State: New South Wales
- LGA: Cabonne Shire
- Location: 339 km (211 mi) NW of Sydney; 78 km (48 mi) NW of Orange; 41 km (25 mi) w of Wellington; 25 km (16 mi) N of Cumnock

Government
  - State electorate: Orange
  - Federal division: Calare
- Elevation: 292 m (958 ft)

Population
  - Total: 221 (UCL 2021)
- Postcode: 2868
- County: Gordon
- Parish: Buckinbah
- Annual rainfall: 635 mm (25.0 in)

Yeoval is a small village in the Central Western district of New South Wales, Australia. The town lies in Cabonne Shire. A small part over Buckinbah Creek referred to as North Yeoval used to lie within Dubbo Regional Council until 2026, when it became part of Cabonne Shire . Yeoval is located between Dubbo and Orange. The town was the childhood home of Australian poet Banjo Paterson, who lived on the nearby Buckinbah property, and many of his poems reflect the area. A Banjo Paterson Museum is open to visitors.

== History ==
Yeoval a village in the Central West of New South Wales, centrally located between Orange, Dubbo, Parkes and Wellington.

In 1868, gold, silver and copper were discovered 7 km from Yeoval. The Goodrich Mine operated in this area periodically until 1971.

Yeoval Post Office opened on 1 November 1884.

Yeoval railway station opened in 1925 on the now closed Molong–Dubbo railway line, and was sited to the north of the village in North Yeoval. Passenger services operated until 1974.

== Population ==
In the 2016 census, there were 430 people in Yeoval. 84.7% of people were born in Australia and 91.6% of people spoke only English at home. The most common responses for religion was Catholic at 26.3%.

The population had dropped to 330 in the 2021 census.

== Schools ==
- Yeoval Central School

The school caters for students from kindergarten to year 12 and has been open for over 125 years. There are 35 HSC courses available to senior students.

- St Columba's Catholic School

This small 25-student school is situated opposite the Catholic Church and adjacent to the original convent building.

- Yeoval Preschool

This is a small community-based preschool.

== Public sculptures and museums ==
Banjo Paterson Bush Park alongside Buckinbah Creek at the junction of Forbes St, Molong St and Renshaw McGirr Way is home to several interesting sculptures.

A giant sculpture of Banjo Paterson's hat is situated in the park. Originally used as a real estate marketing tool, it was donated by the former owner and Orange councillor Chris Gryllis in February 2017.

The park is also home to a 6 metre high, six tonne abstract artwork depicting prolific sculptor Henry Moore created by his protégé Drago Marin Cherina.

The Banjo Paterson... More Than a Poet Cafe and Museum houses a collection of handwritten letters, unpublished poems, photos, stories, editorials and other memorabilia of the era which tell the story of the poet's life.

== Churches ==
- St Luke's Anglican Church (closed in 2014)
- Yeoval Baptist Church
- Church of Our Lady
- Yeoval Uniting Church ( closed)

== Gallery ==
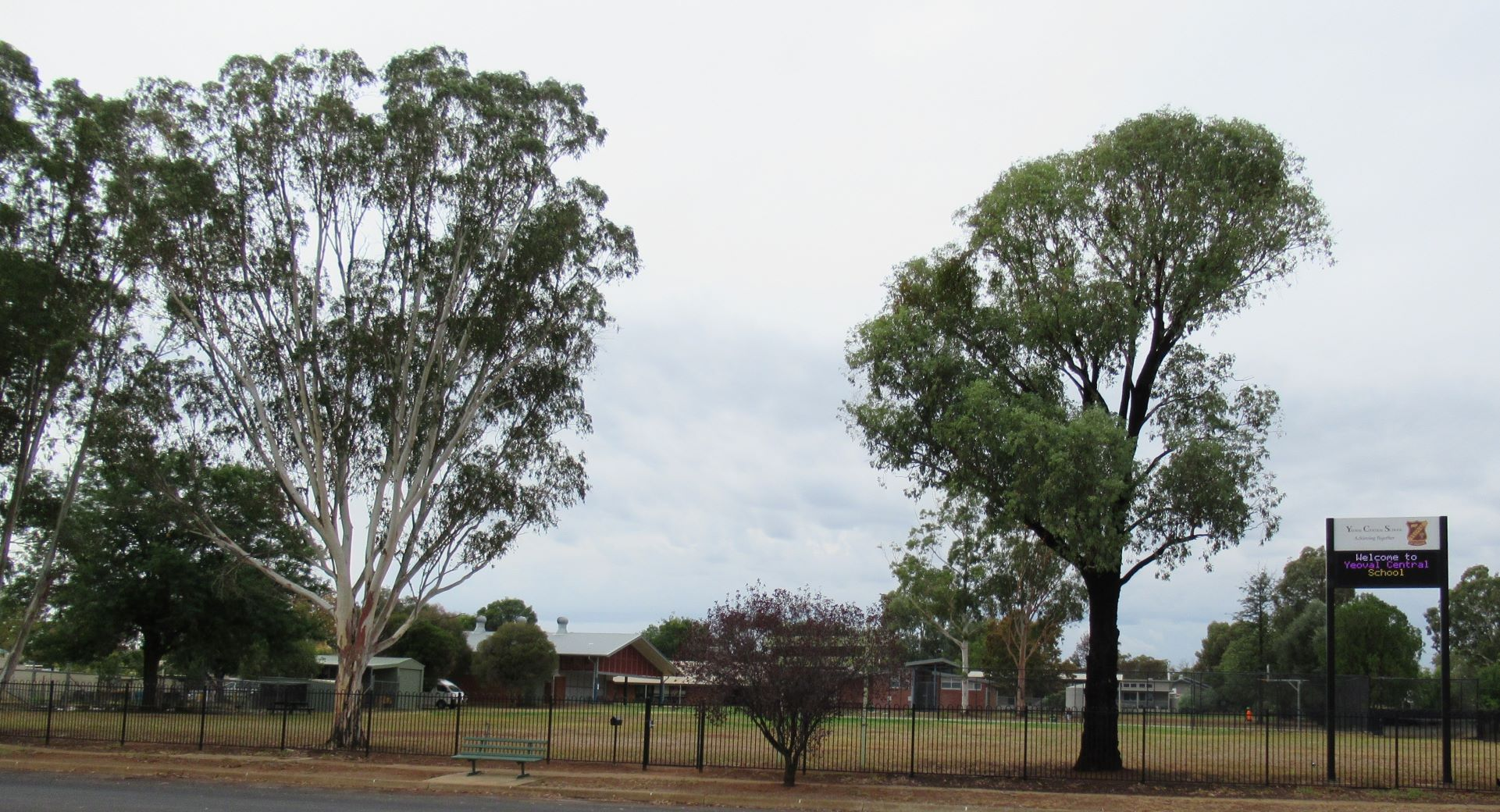
Yeoval Central School

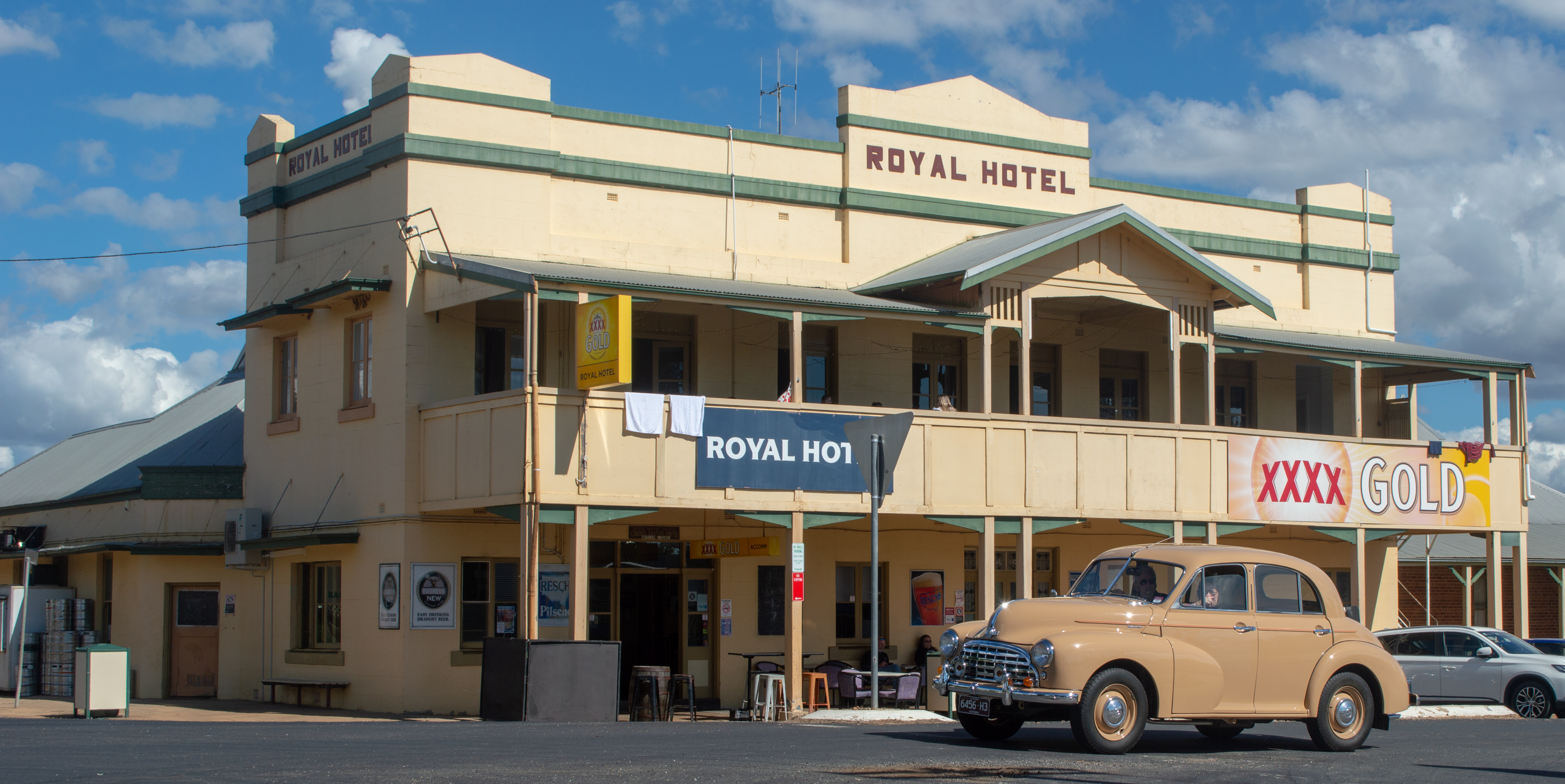
Yeoval Royal Hotel

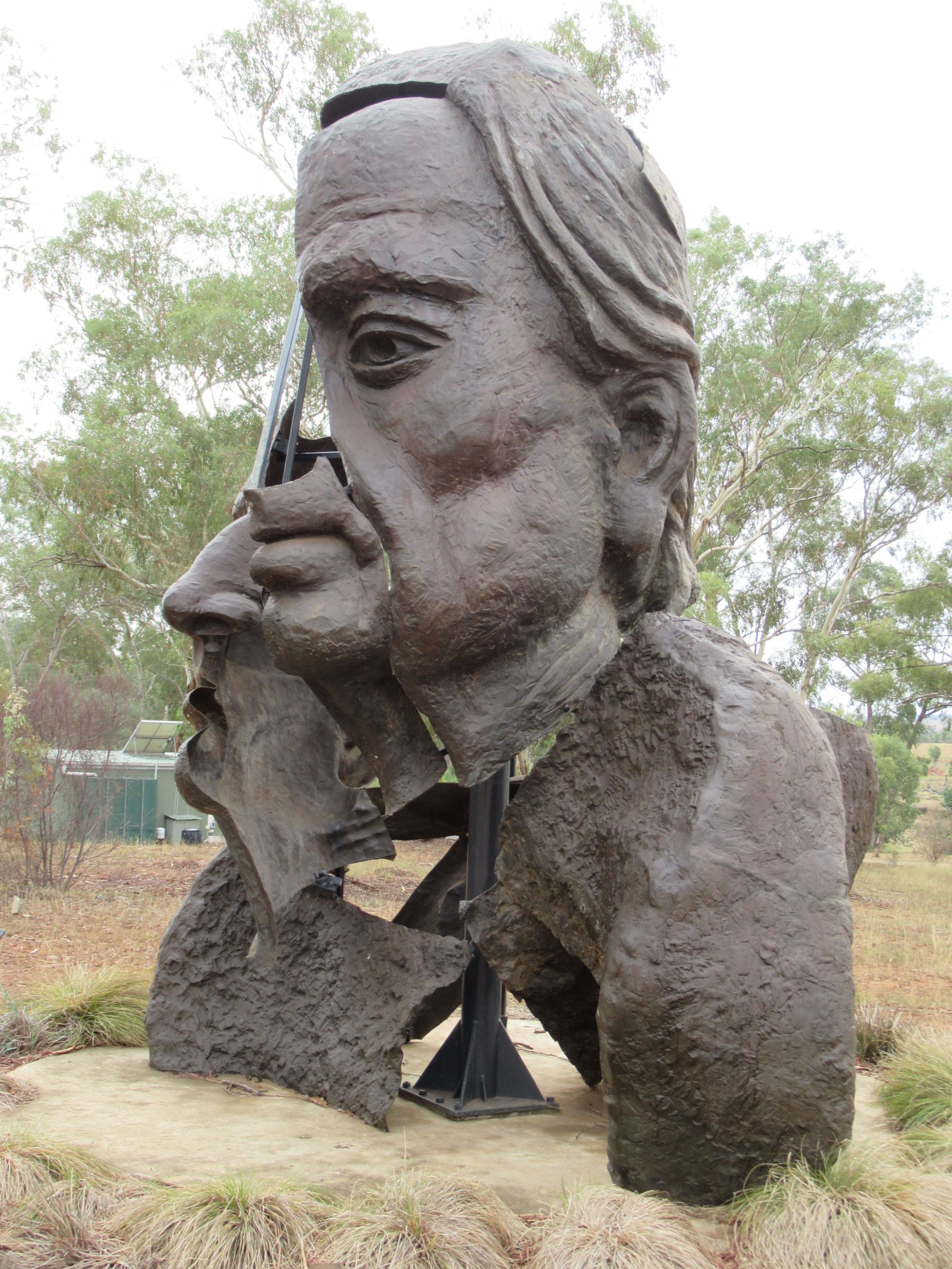
Sculpture of Henry Moore

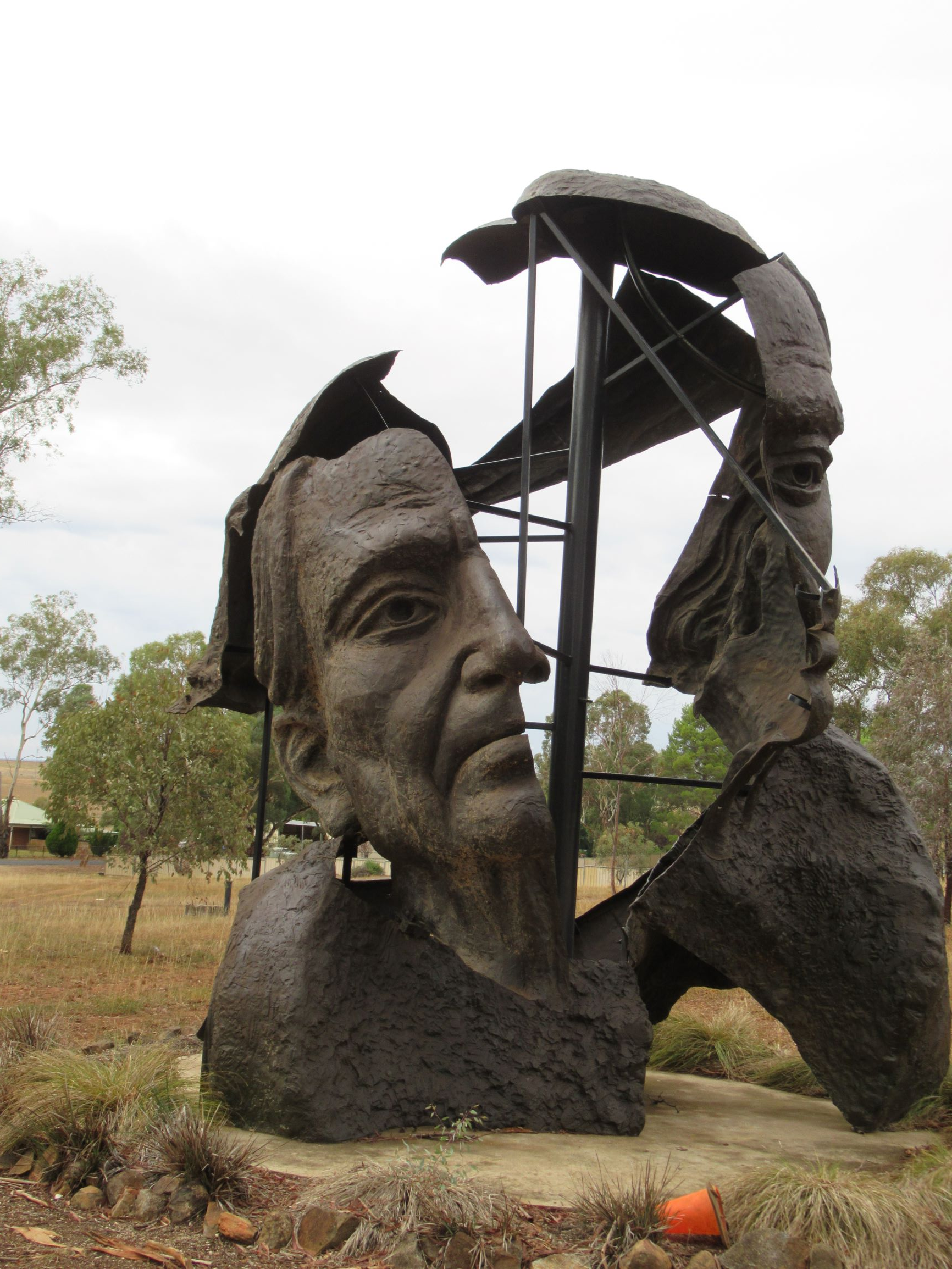
Sculpture of Henry Moore

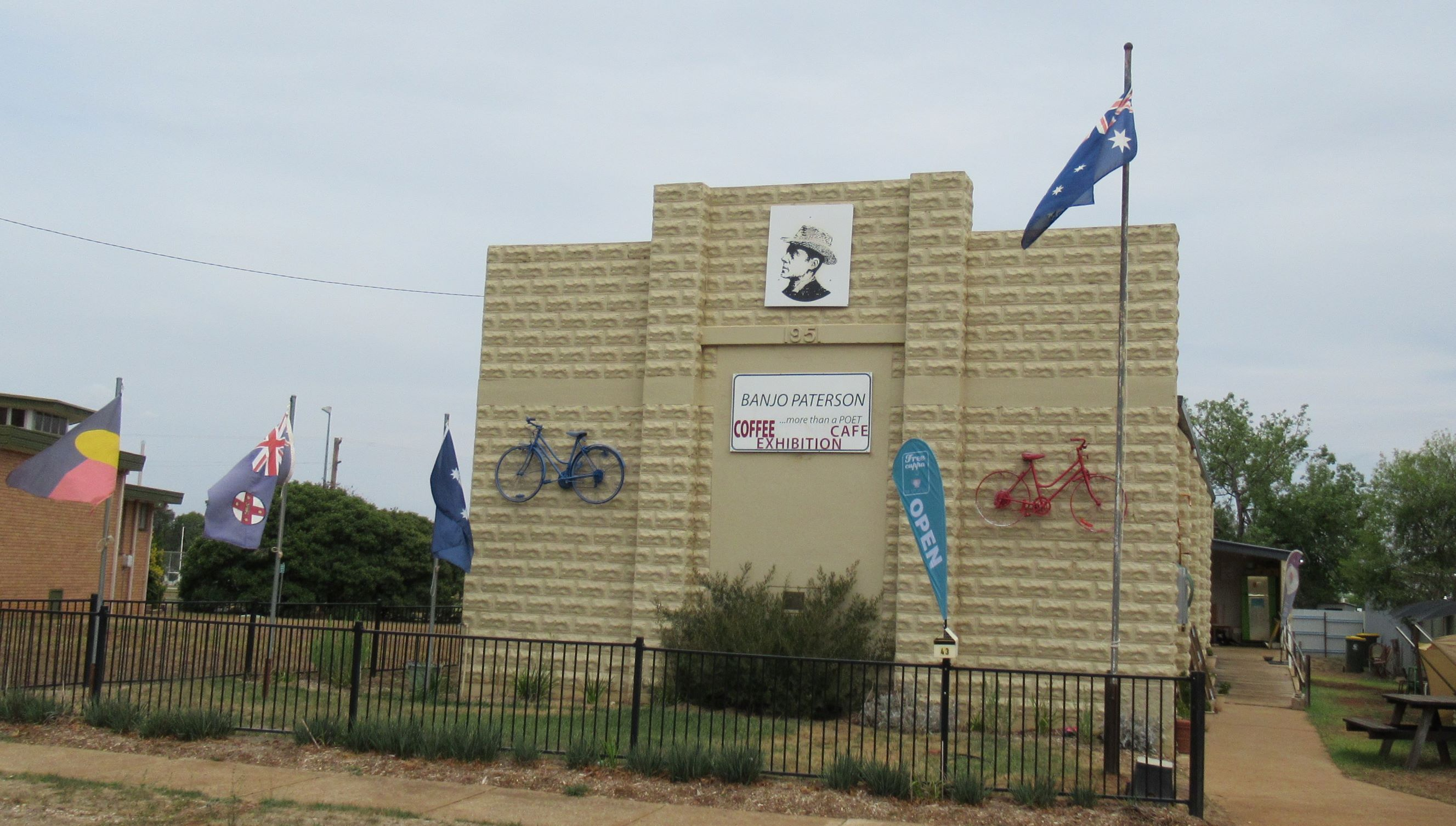
Banjo Paterson ... more than a Poet Museum

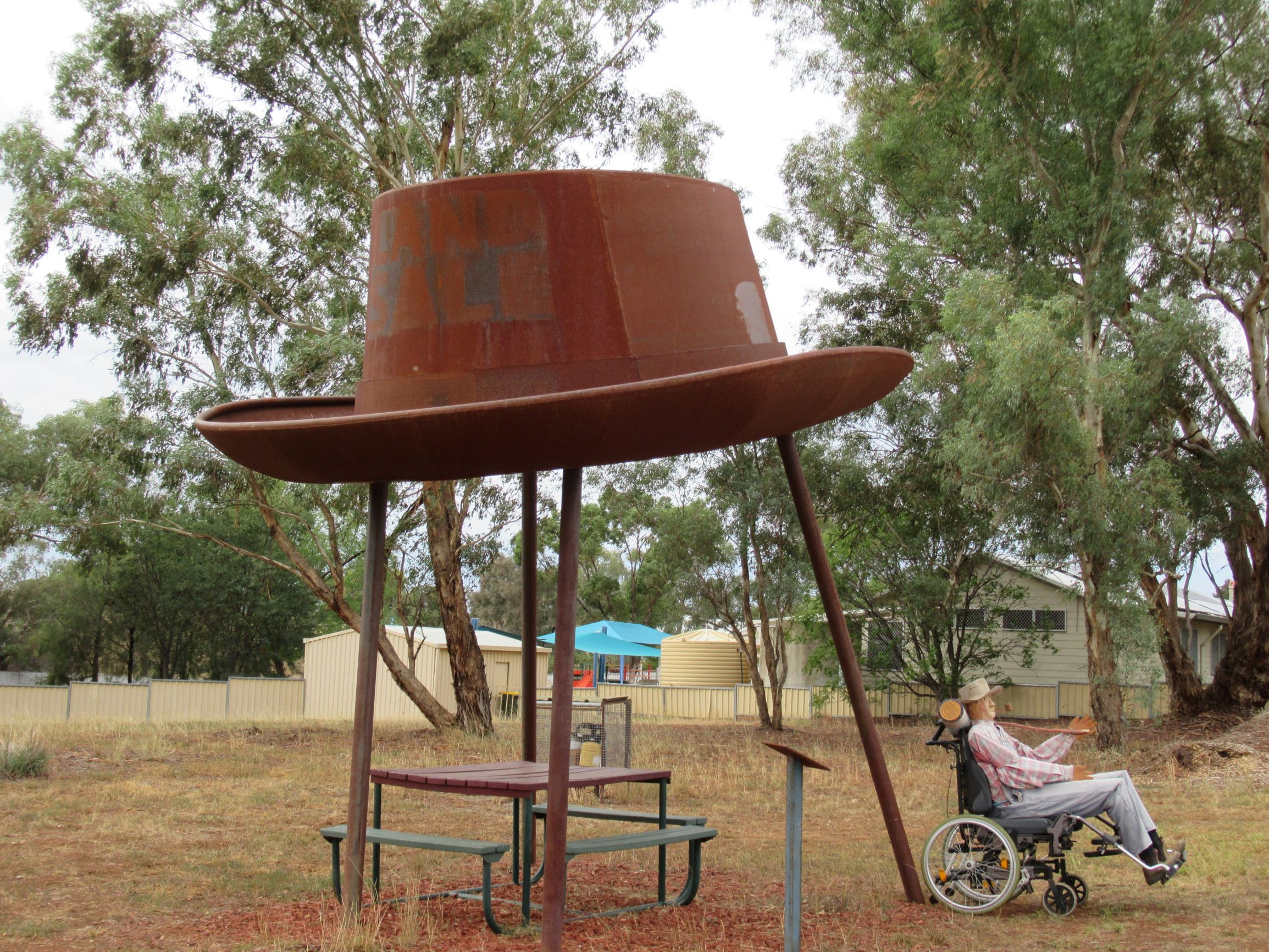
Big Hat sculpture

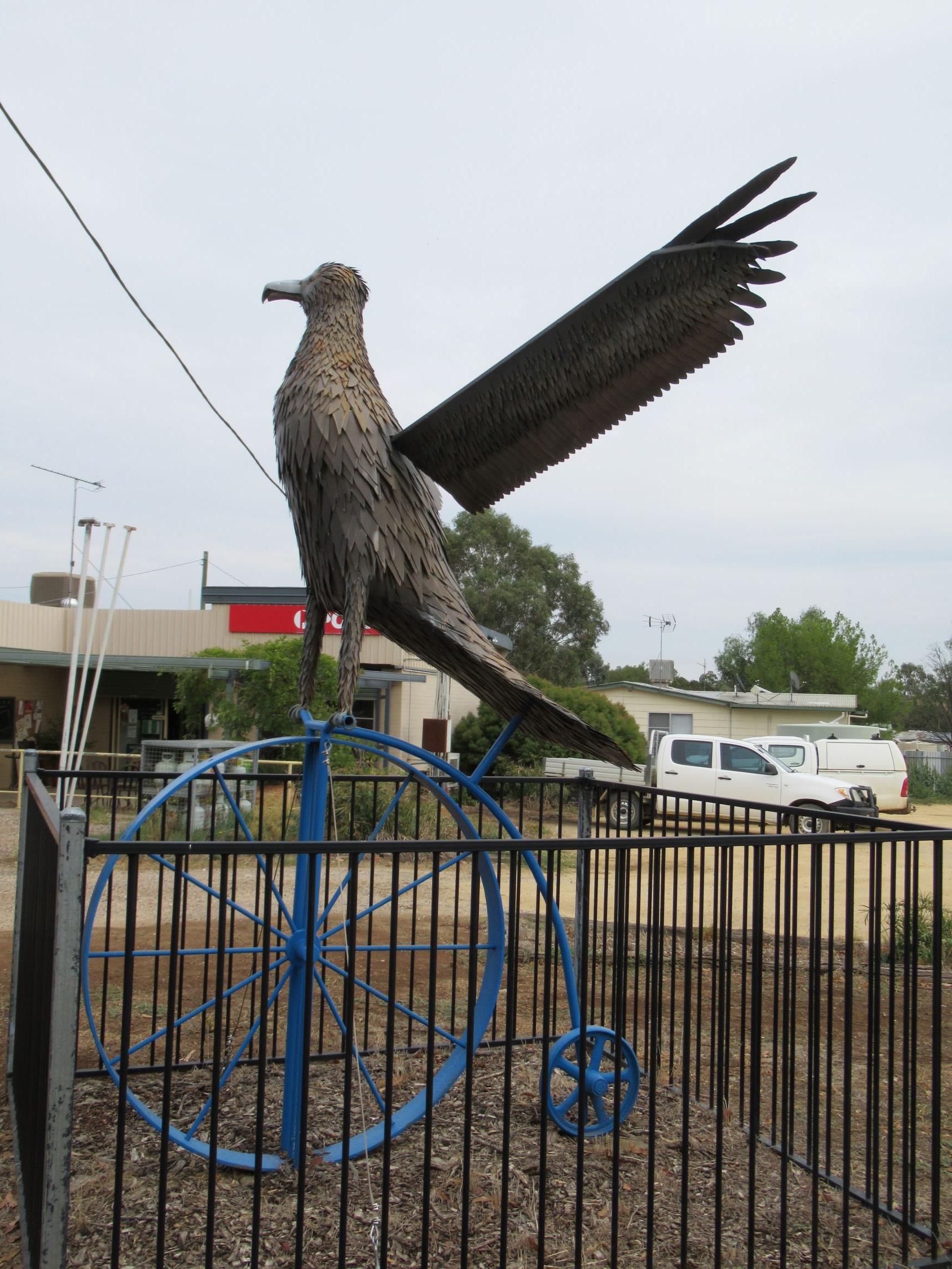
Eagle Majestic sculpture by Don Cameron in Yeoval

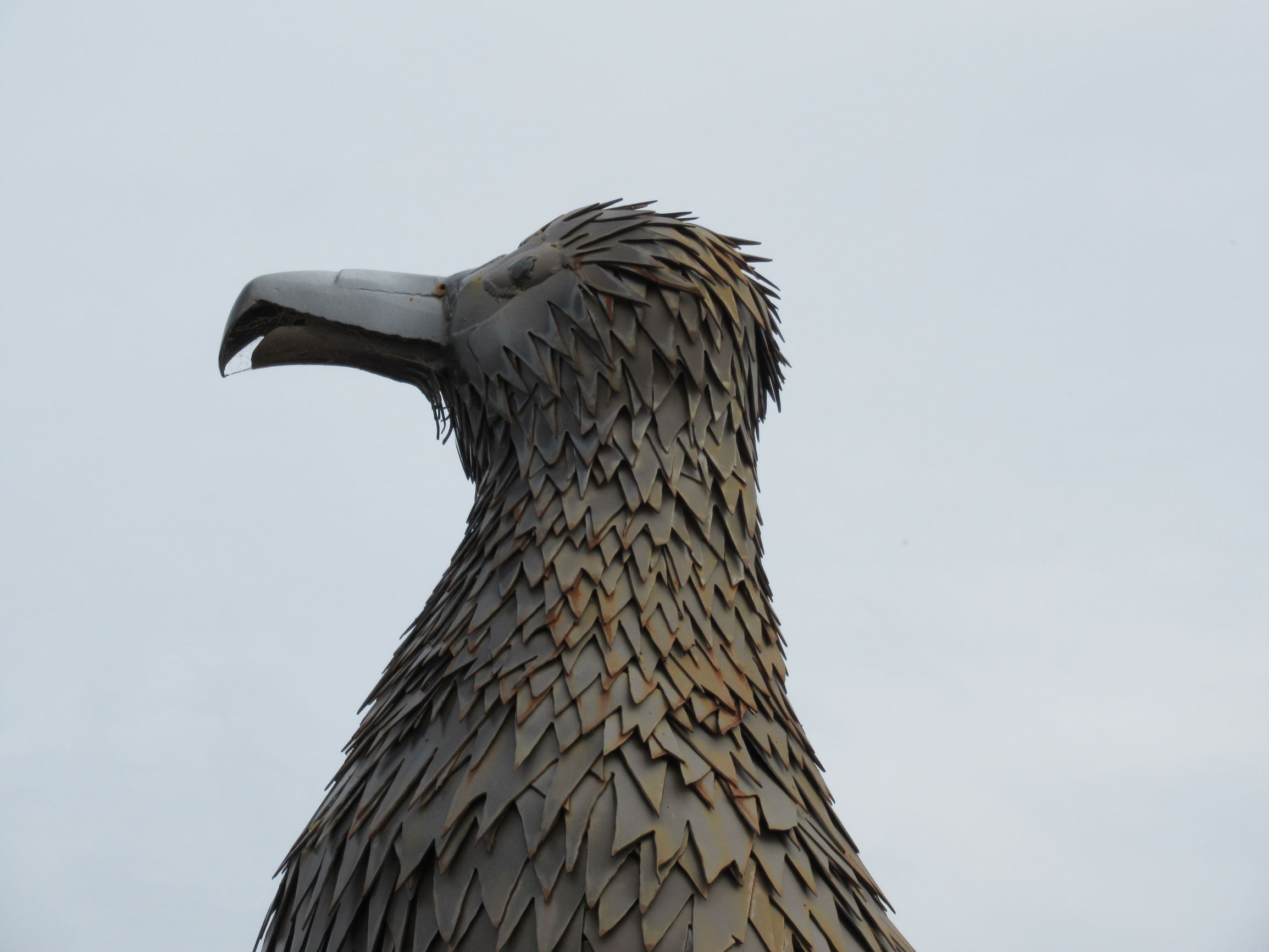
Eagle Majestic sculpture by Don Cameron in Yeoval
