= Electro-pneumatic control =

Electro-pneumatic control systems are built with electrical components to control pneumatic components (for example through electrically operated valves).

== Description ==
The working medium, compressed air, is controlled by electrical signals.

In contrast to purely pneumatic controls, electro-pneumatic controls allow significantly more complex functions, especially through the use of electronic circuits such as programmable logic controls. The advantage of pneumatics lies in the simple and cost-effective implementation of actuators, for example with pneumatic cylinders.

== Examples ==
- Pipe organs:
  - Electro-pneumatic action
  - Tubular-pneumatic action
- Railway brakes
  - Electro-pneumatic brake system on British railway trains
- Electrostatic–pneumatic activation
- Electropneumatic paintball marker

== See also ==
- Mechatronics – Combination of electronics and mechanics
