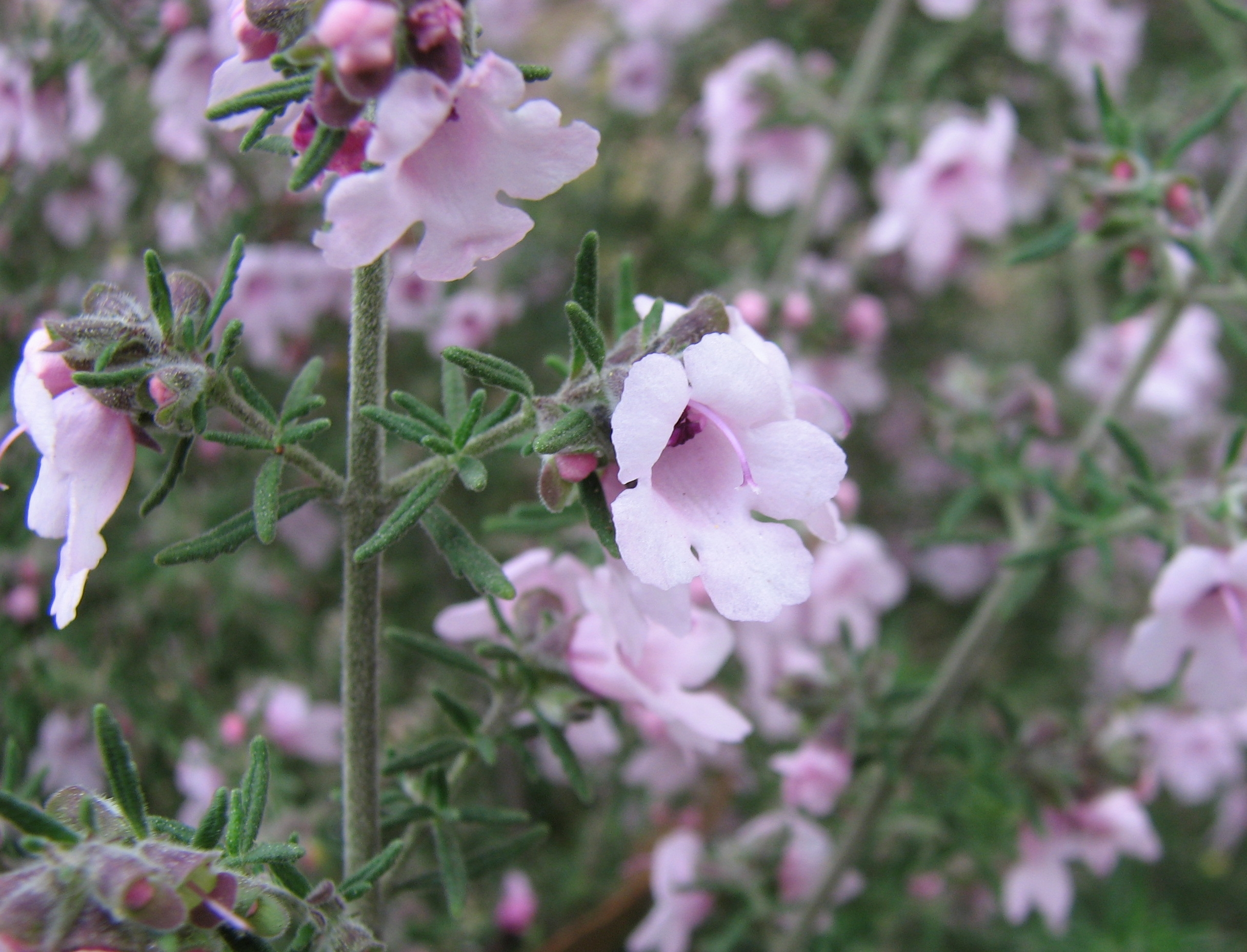
- In Maranoa Gardens

Scientific classification
- Kingdom: Plantae
- Clade: Tracheophytes
- Clade: Angiosperms
- Clade: Eudicots
- Clade: Asterids
- Order: Lamiales
- Family: Lamiaceae
- Genus: Prostanthera
- Species: P. stenophylla

Binomial name
- Prostanthera stenophylla B.J.Conn
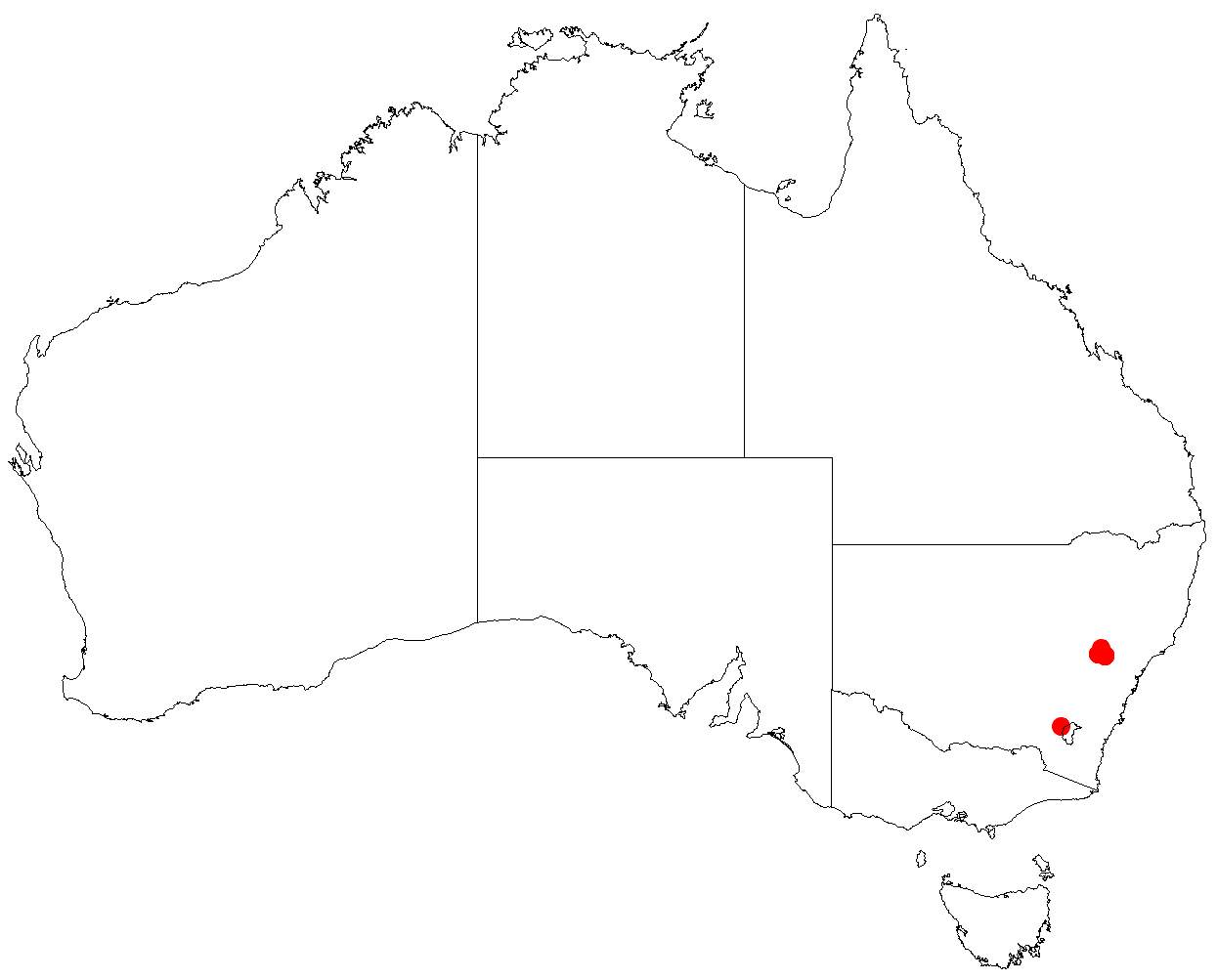
- Occurrence data from AVH

Synonyms
- Prostanthera sp. Rylstone

= Prostanthera stenophylla =

Species of flowering plant

Prostanthera stenophylla is a species of flowering plant in the family Lamiaceae and is endemic to Wollemi National Park in New South Wales. It is an erect, slender, aromatic shrub with hairy, oblong leaves and small groups of pale bluish mauve to violet flowers.

== Description ==
Prostanthera stenophylla is an erect, slender shrub that typically grows to a height of 1.5–2 m (4 ft 11 in – 6 ft 7 in) and has leaves that are covered with a dense mat of hairs and give off a strong aroma when crushed. The leaves are narrow egg-shaped to narrow elliptic but appear oblong due to the edge being curved downwards or rolled under. They are dull green above, paler below, 7–14 mm (0.28–0.55 in) long and 1.5–2 mm (0.059–0.079 in) wide on a very short petiole. The flowers are arranged in groups of four to six on short side shoots in leaf axils, with bracteoles 2–2.5 mm (0.079–0.098 in) long at the base of the sepals. The sepals are 4–5 mm (0.16–0.20 in) long forming a tube 2–3 mm (0.079–0.118 in) long with two lobes, the upper lobe 1.5–2 mm (0.059–0.079 in) long. The petals are pale bluish mauve to violet, 8–12 mm (0.31–0.47 in) long, the lower middle lobe 4–5 mm (0.16–0.20 in) long and wide, the lower lobes 3–3.8 mm (0.12–0.15 in) long and wide and the upper lobe about 4 mm (0.16 in) long and 8.5–10 mm (0.33–0.39 in) wide with a central notch 2.5–3 mm (0.098–0.118 in) deep. Flowering occurs in most months with a peak flowering in spring.

== Taxonomy ==
Prostanthera stenophylla was first formally described by Barry Conn of the National Herbarium of New South Wales in the journal Telopea in 2006 from specimens collected near Dunns Swamp in 1996. He held it to be allied to the granite mintbush (Prostanthera granitica). The latter species is similar in appearance but has stiffer, rougher hairs and broader leaves.

The first recorded collection of plant material from the type locality was by nurseryman George Althofer in 1952. A 1937 collection by Lindsay Pryor is recognised as this species, but the given locality of "Canberra district" is believed to be incorrect. The specific epithet (stenophylla) refers to the narrow leaves of this shrub species.

== Distribution and habitat ==
This mintbush is only known from the Wollemi National Park where it is found in sclerophyll forest dominated by black cypress pine (Callitris endlicheri), snappy gum (Eucalyptus rossii) and Sydney peppermint (E. piperita), growing in sandstone outcrops that are colloquially known as 'pagodas'.

== Use in horticulture ==
This species has been in limited cultivation for some years. The unofficial name of Prostanthera rylstonii has been used by plant nurseries since at least 2005.
