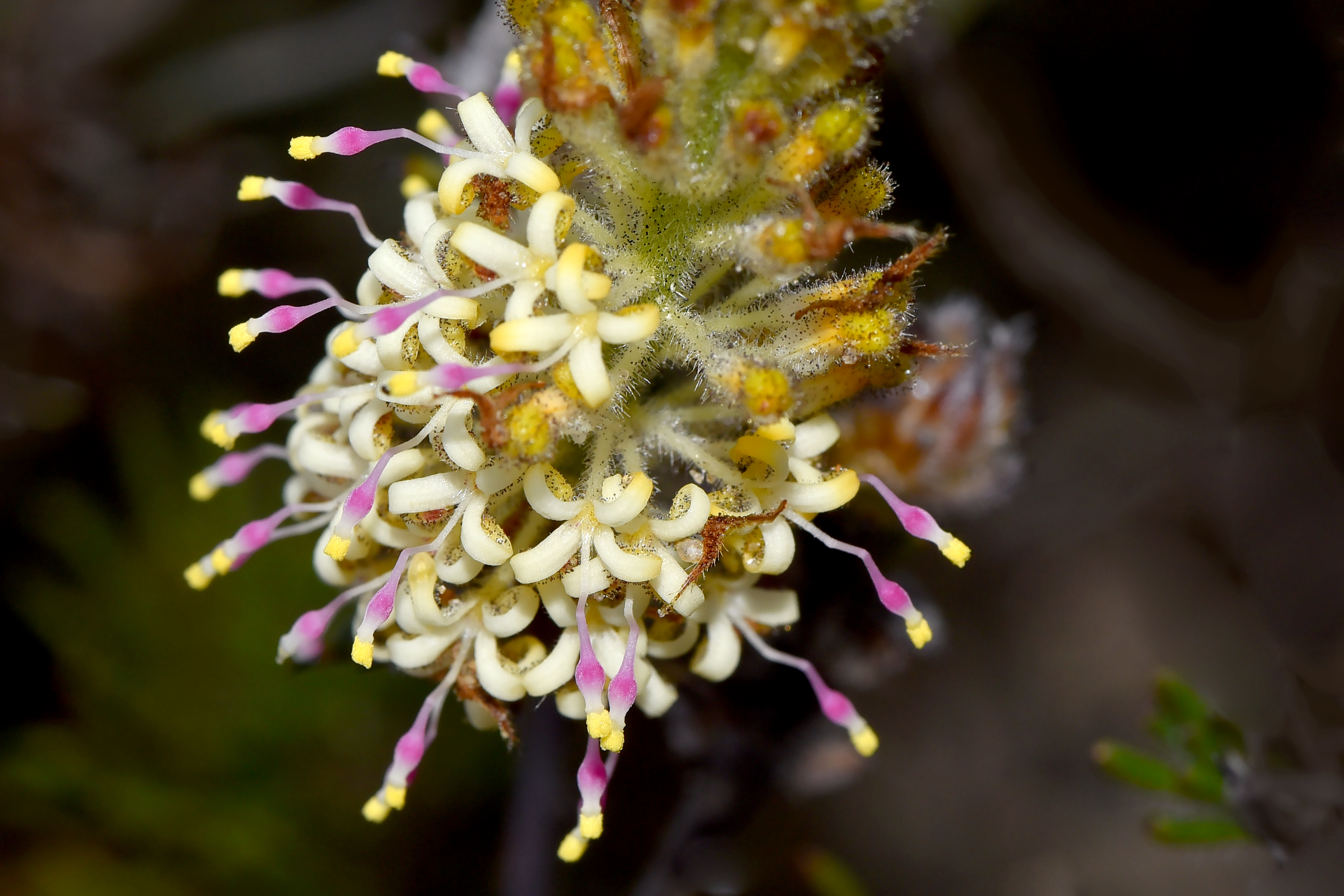

Conservation status
- Priority Four — Rare Taxa (DEC)

Scientific classification
- Kingdom: Plantae
- Clade: Tracheophytes
- Clade: Angiosperms
- Clade: Eudicots
- Order: Proteales
- Family: Proteaceae
- Genus: Grevillea
- Species: G. rudis

Binomial name
- Grevillea rudis Meisn.

= Grevillea rudis =

Species of shrub endemic to Western Australia

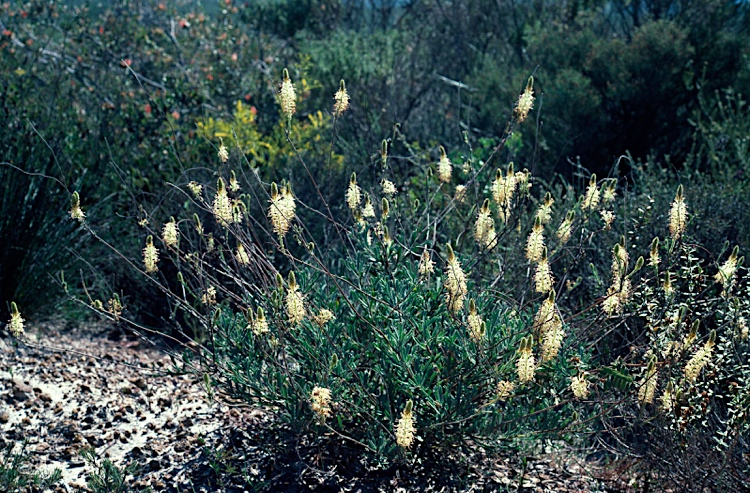
Habit near Jurien Bay

Grevillea rudis is a species of flowering plant in the family Proteaceae and is endemic to the south-west of Western Australia. It is a loose, spreading to erect shrub with divided leaves, the end lobes more or less triangular to oblong and sharply pointed, and more or less cylindrical clusters of cream-coloured flowers, the style turning pink as it ages.

== Description ==
Grevillea rudis is a loose, spreading to erect shrub that typically grows to a height of 20–90 cm (7.9–35.4 in). Its leaves are mostly 15–30 mm (0.59–1.18 in) long, 5–20 mm (0.20–0.79 in) wide and divided with 3 to 5 broadly triangular to oblong lobes sometimes divided again, the end lobes or teeth more or less triangular to oblong, sharply pointed and 5–10 mm (0.20–0.39 in) long. The lower surface of the leaves is scaly at first, later glabrous. The flowers are arranged above the foliage in a more or less cylindrical cluster 30–120 mm (1.2–4.7 in) long. The flowers are cream-coloured, the style creamy white, the pollen presenter turning pinkish as it ages, and the pistil is 5.0–6.5 mm (0.20–0.26 in) long. Flowering occurs sporadically throughout the year with a peak in spring, and the fruit is an oval follicle 11–12 mm (0.43–0.47 in) long.

This grevillea is similar to G.althoferorum but has less deeply divided leaves, the flowers held above the foliage.

== Taxonomy ==
Grevillea rudis was first formally described in 1855 Carl Meisnerin Hooker's Journal of Botany and Kew Garden Miscellany from specimens collected by James Drummond. The specific epithet (rudis) means "rough" or "wild", referring to the leaves and branches.

== Distribution and habitat ==
This grevillea grows in well-drained laterite between Eneabba, Jurien Bay and Watheroo in the Coolgardie, Geraldton Sandplains and Swan Coastal Plain bioregions of south-western Western Australia.

== Conservation status ==
Grevillea rudis is listed as "Priority Four" by the Government of Western Australia Department of Biodiversity, Conservation and Attractions, meaning that it is rare or near threatened.

== See also ==
- List of Grevillea species
