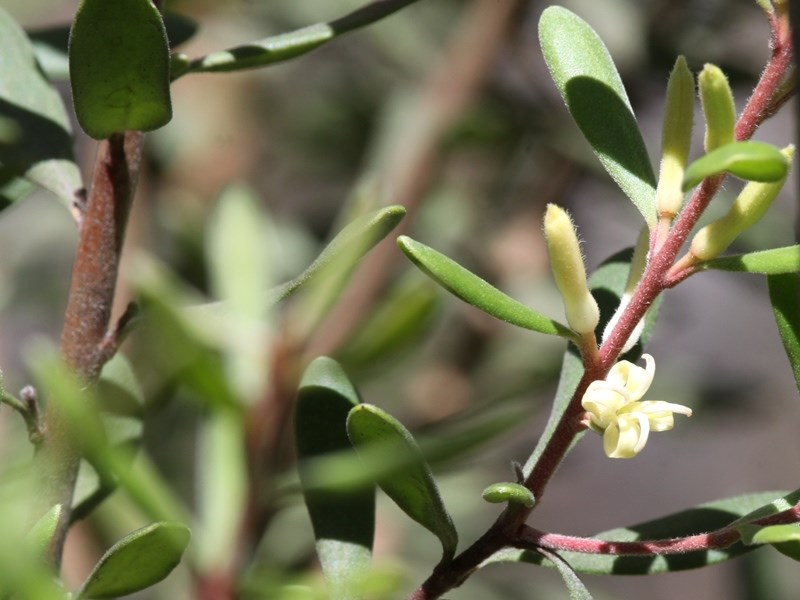
- In Namadgi National Park

Scientific classification
- Kingdom: Plantae
- Clade: Tracheophytes
- Clade: Angiosperms
- Clade: Eudicots
- Order: Proteales
- Family: Proteaceae
- Genus: Persoonia
- Species: P. subvelutina

Binomial name
- Persoonia subvelutina L.A.S.Johnson

= Persoonia subvelutina =

Velvety geebung

Species of flowering plant

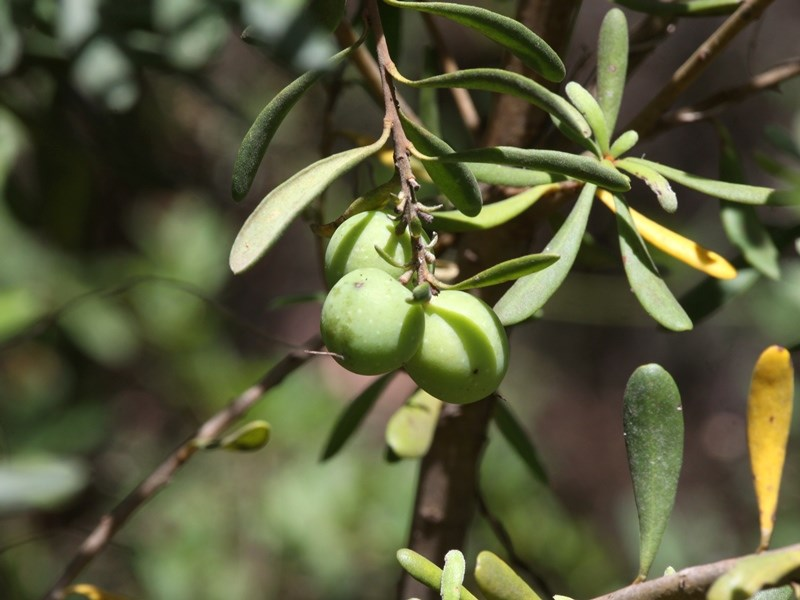
Fruit

Persoonia subvelutina, commonly known as velvety geebung, is a plant in the family Proteaceae and is endemic to south-eastern Australia. It is a spreading shrub or small tree with branchlets that are hairy when young, elliptic, lance-shaped, egg-shaped or spatula-shaped leaves, and yellow flowers arranged singly in leaf axils on a pedicel 1–4 mm (0.039–0.157 in) long.

== Description ==
Persoonia subvelutina is a spreading shrub or small tree that typically grows to a height of 0.5–5 m (1 ft 8 in – 16 ft 5 in) and has hairy young branchlets. The leaves are elliptic, lance-shaped, egg-shaped or spatula-shaped, 30–70 mm (1.2–2.8 in) long and 6–15 mm (0.24–0.59 in) wide with the edges turned downwards. The flowers are arranged singly in leaf axils on a hairy pedicel 1–4 mm (0.039–0.157 in) long. The tepals are yellow, hairy and 11–15 mm (0.43–0.59 in) long. Flowering occurs in summer, and the fruit is an oval, green drupe up to about 14 mm (0.55 in) long and 12 mm (0.47 in) wide.

== Taxonomy ==
Persoonia subvelutina was first formally described in 1957 by Lawrie Johnson in The Victorian Naturalist from specimens collected in 1954 by George Althofer near the upper Snowy River.

== Distribution and habitat ==
Velvety geebung grows in woodland and forest between Brindabella in New South Wales and the montane and subalpine forests of north-eastern Victoria.
