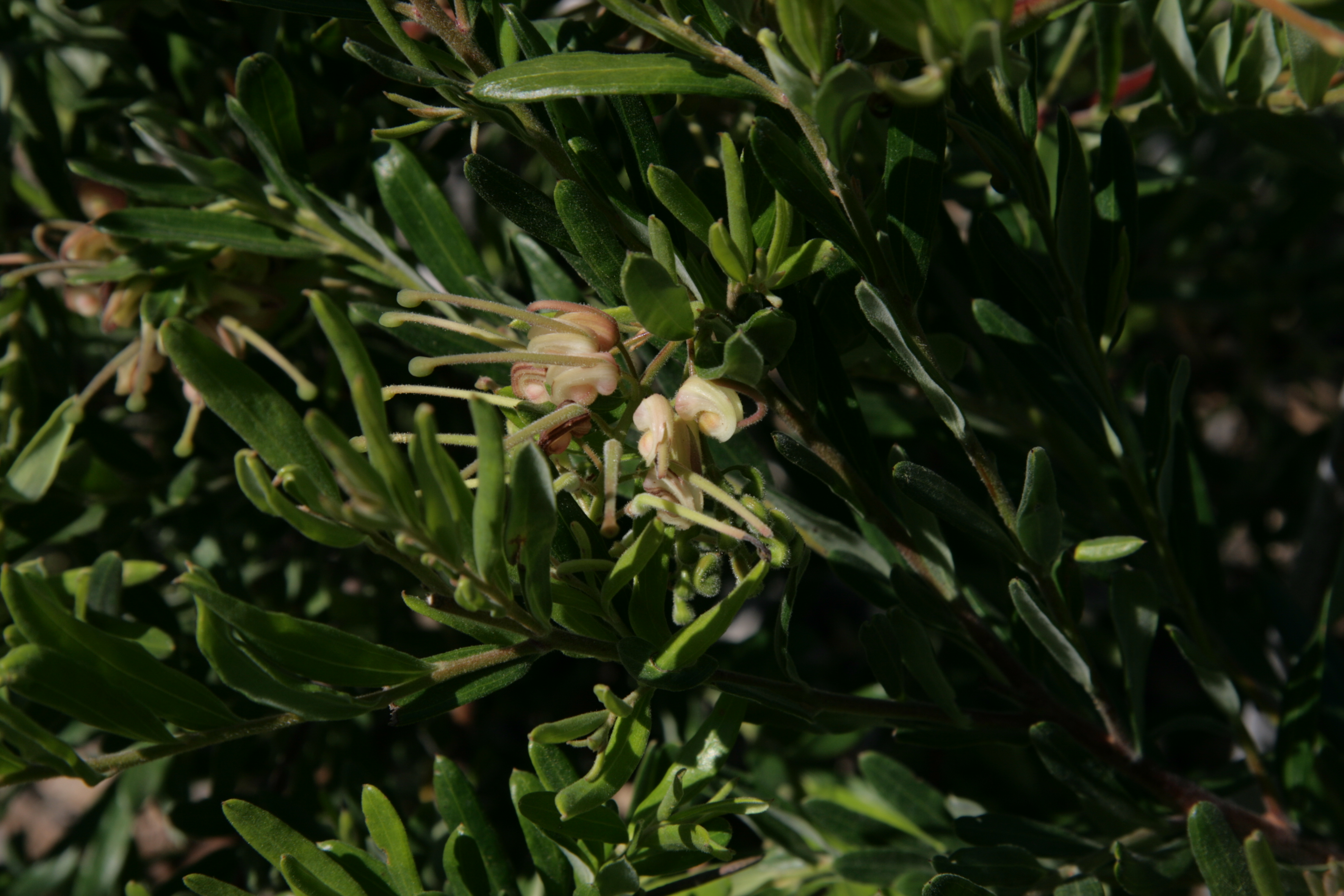
- In Burrendong Arboretum

Conservation status
- Least Concern (IUCN 3.1)

- Priority Three — Poorly Known Taxa (DEC)

Scientific classification
- Kingdom: Plantae
- Clade: Embryophytes
- Clade: Tracheophytes
- Clade: Angiosperms
- Clade: Eudicots
- Order: Proteales
- Family: Proteaceae
- Genus: Grevillea
- Species: G. granulosa

Binomial name
- Grevillea granulosa McGill.

= Grevillea granulosa =

Species of shrub endemic to Western Australia

Grevillea granulosa is a species of flowering plant in the family Proteaceae and is endemic to the south-west of Western Australia. It is a low, spreading shrub with linear leaves and red to orange flowers in clusters of up to eight.

== Description ==
Grevillea granulosa is a compact to spreading shrub that typically grows to a height of 0.4–1.5 m (1 ft 4 in – 4 ft 11 in). Its leaves are linear, 35–160 mm (1.4–6.3 in) long, 1.2–2.5 mm (0.047–0.098 in) wide and silky-hairy, with the edges rolled under, enclosing most of the lower surface. The flowers are arranged in clusters of three to eight on a woolly-hairy rachis 0.5–6 mm (0.020–0.236 in) long. The flowers are red to orange, rarely yellow, the pistil 20–23 mm (0.79–0.91 in) long. Flowering occurs from July to October and the fruit is an oval or narrowly elliptic follicle 10–14 mm (0.39–0.55 in) long and ridged with a few shaggy hairs.

== Taxonomy ==
Grevillea granulosa was first formally described in 1986 by Donald McGillivray in his book New Names in Grevillea (Proteaceae), based on specimens collected by Alison Marjorie Ashby between Mullewa and Pindar in 1965. The specific epithet (granulosa) means "abounding in small grains", referring to the leaf surface.

== Distribution and habitat ==
This grevillea grows in shrubland, mallee scrub, or woodland in the area between Wubin, Lake Moore and Yuna in the Avon Wheatbelt, Geraldton Sandplains and Yuna biogeographic regions of south-western Western Australia.

== Conservation status ==
Grevillea granulosa is listed as least concern on the IUCN Red List of Threatened Species. Although it has a fragmented range and an estimated extent of occurrence of approximately 20,000 km^{2} (7,700 sq mi), this species is only facing minor threats that are not severe enough to warrant a threatened category. Historical land clearing for agriculture have left its range fragmented, though this has now ceased. It is currently threatened by weed invasion and clearance of roadside verges where many populations occur. The population is currently believed to be stable and it occurs in multiple nature reserves.

It is also classified as priority three by the Government of Western Australia Department of Biodiversity, Conservation and Attractions, meaning that it is poorly known and known from only a few locations but is not under imminent threat.
