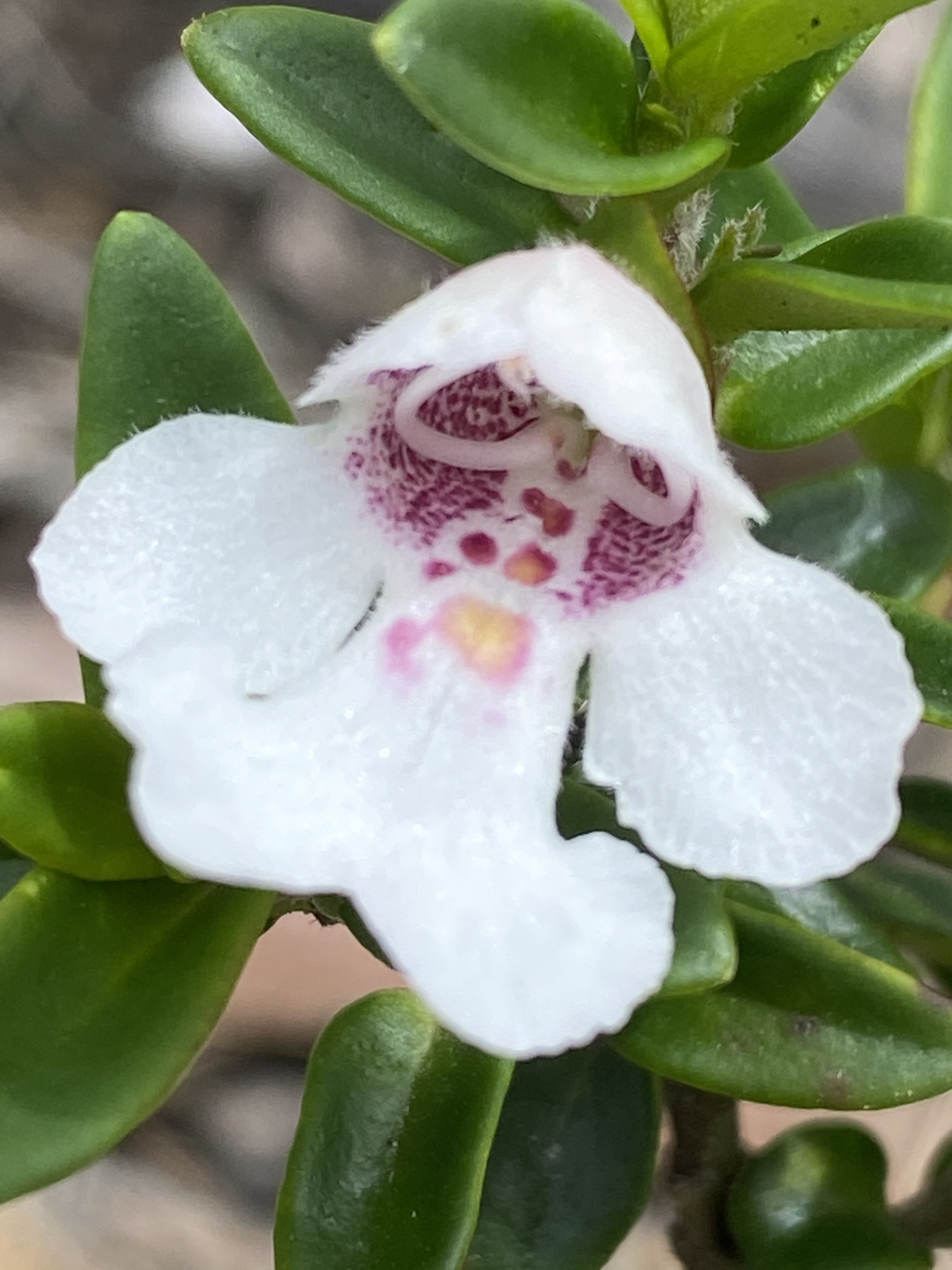

Scientific classification
- Kingdom: Plantae
- Clade: Tracheophytes
- Clade: Angiosperms
- Clade: Eudicots
- Clade: Asterids
- Order: Lamiales
- Family: Lamiaceae
- Genus: Prostanthera
- Species: P. gilesii

Binomial name
- Prostanthera gilesii Althofer ex B.J.Conn & T.C.Wilson
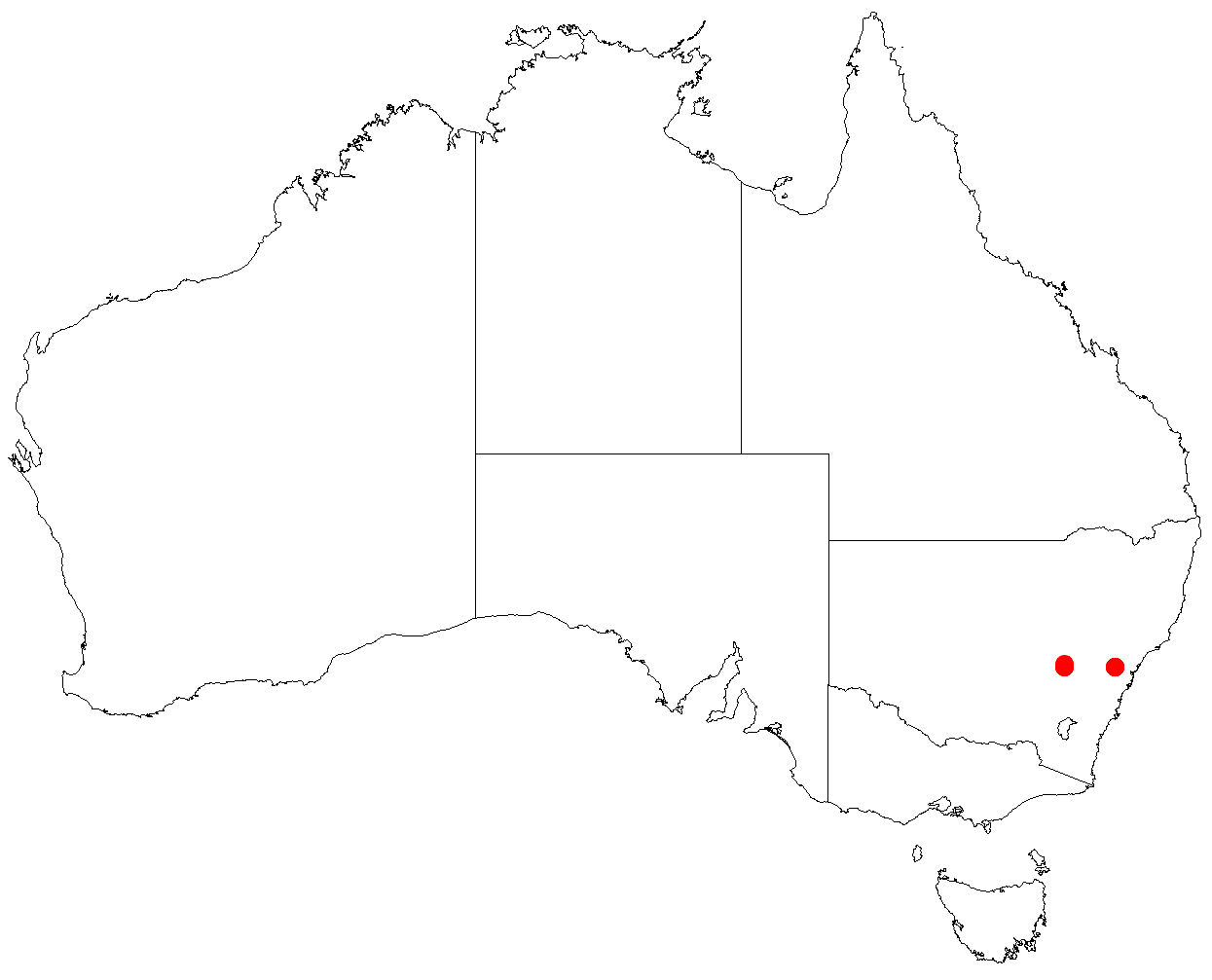
- Occurrence data from AVH

= Prostanthera gilesii =

Species of flowering plant

Prostanthera gilesii is a species of flowering plant in the family Lamiaceae and is endemic to the Mount Canobolas area of New South Wales. It is a small, compact, spreading shrub with aromatic, narrow egg-shaped to elliptical leaves, and white to yellowish white flowers with purple to dark mauve markings inside the petal tube and pale orange markings on the petal lobes.

== Description ==
Prostanthera gilesii is a compact, spreading shrub that typically grows to a height of up to 1 m (3 ft 3 in) and has more or less cylindrical, moderately hairy branchlets. The leaves are aromatic, glossy dark green, paler on the lower side, almost glabrous, narrow egg-shaped to more elliptical, 15–26 mm (0.59–1.02 in) long and 6–10 mm (0.24–0.39 in) wide on a petiole 1–2 mm (0.039–0.079 in) long. The flowers are arranged singly in three or four upper leaf axils with bracteoles about 3–3.5 mm (0.12–0.14 in) long at the base. The sepals are green and form a tube 2.5–3 mm (0.098–0.118 in) wide with two lobes, the lower lobe 5–6 mm (0.20–0.24 in) long and 3.5–4 mm (0.14–0.16 in) wide and the upper lobe 5–6 mm (0.20–0.24 in) long and 4.5–5.5 mm (0.18–0.22 in) wide. The petals are white to yellowish white and 12–15 mm (0.47–0.59 in) long forming a tube 7–9 mm (0.28–0.35 in) long with purple to dark mauve marking inside the tube. The central lower lobe has pale orange markings and is 10–11 mm (0.39–0.43 in) long and 4–4.5 mm (0.16–0.18 in) wide, the side lobes 7–8 mm (0.28–0.31 in) long and 4 mm (0.16 in) wide. The upper lobe is 4–5 mm (0.16–0.20 in) long and 8–9 mm (0.31–0.35 in) wide with a central notch about 1 mm (0.039 in) deep. Flowering occurs in November and December.

== Taxonomy and naming ==
Prostanthera gilesii was first formally described in 2015 by Barry Conn and Trevor Wilson from an unpublished description by George Althofer and the description was published in the journal Telopea. The specific epithet (gilesii) was proposed by Althofer to honour William E. Giles who discovered the species in the 1940s. Molecular studies have demonstrated that P. gilesii is closely related to Prostanthera phylicifolia and Prostanthera volucris.

== Distribution and habitat ==
This mint bush grows in forest dominated by Eucalyptus dalrympleana but is only known from the Mount Canobolas State Conservation Area.

== Conservation status ==
This mintbush is listed as "critically endangered" under the New South Wales Government Biodiversity Conservation Act 2016. The main threats to the species are its small population size, inappropriate fire regimes, weed invasion, disturbance by pigs and illegal collection of plant material.
