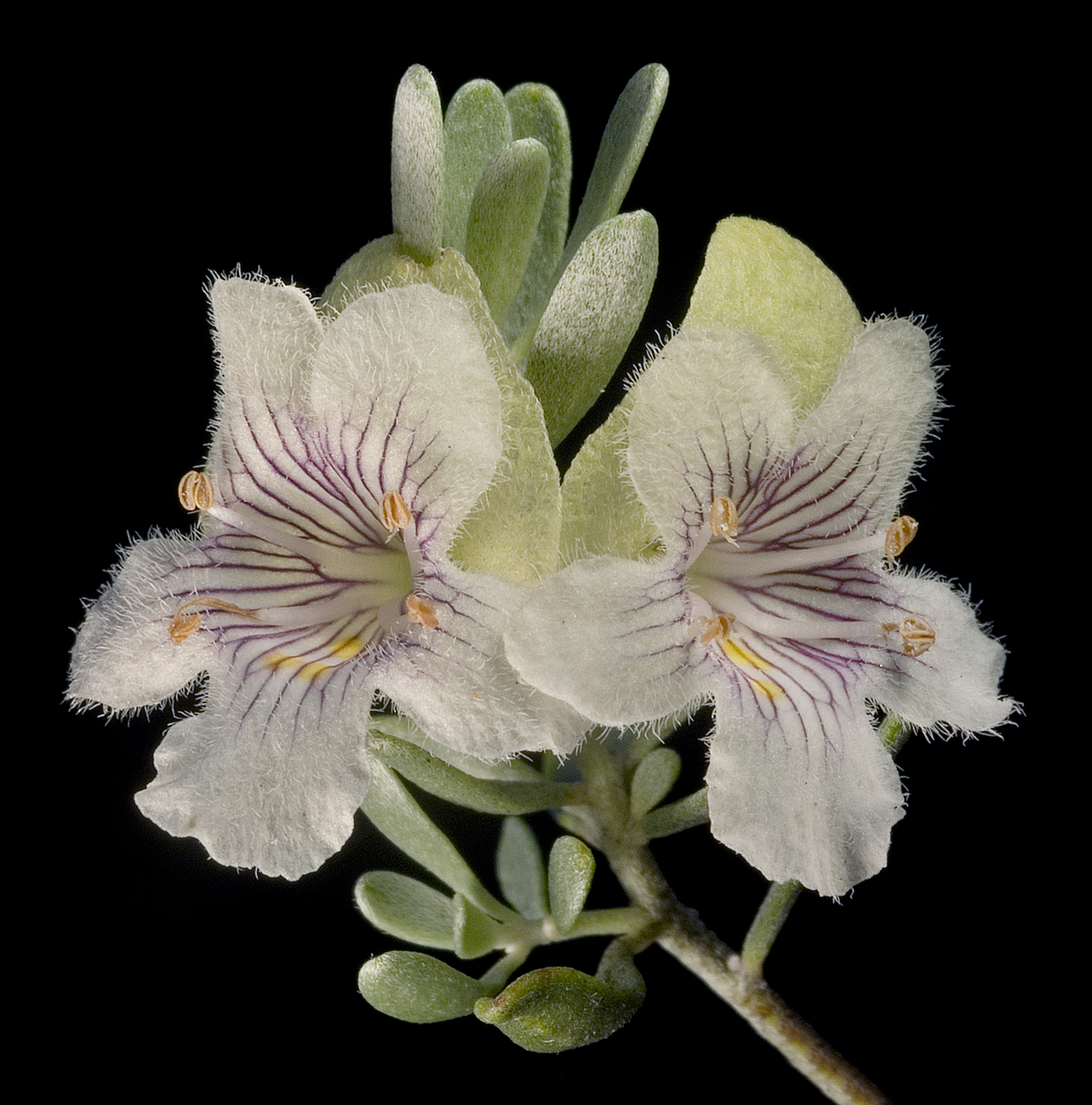

Scientific classification
- Kingdom: Plantae
- Clade: Tracheophytes
- Clade: Angiosperms
- Clade: Eudicots
- Clade: Asterids
- Order: Lamiales
- Family: Lamiaceae
- Genus: Prostanthera
- Species: P. althoferi

Binomial name
- Prostanthera althoferi B.J.Conn
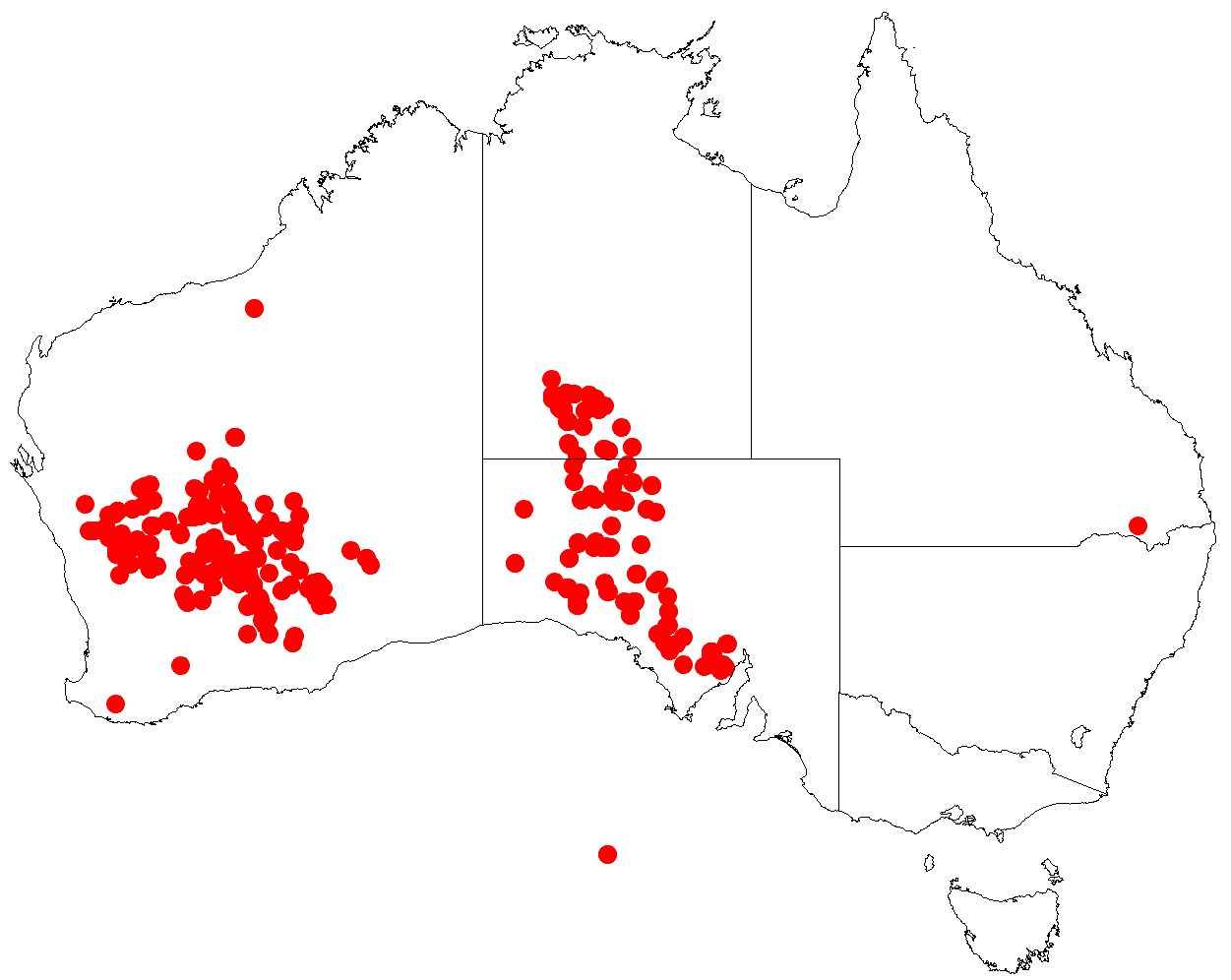
- Occurrence data from AVH

= Prostanthera althoferi =

Species of flowering plant

Prostanthera althoferi is a species of flowering plant in the family Lamiaceae and is endemic to inland areas of Australia. It is an erect shrub with its stems and leaves densely covered with silvery, greyish-green hairs, and has narrow egg-shaped leaves and white to cream-coloured flowers with mauve or purple striations inside.

== Description ==
Prostanthera althoferi is an erect shrub that typically grows to a height of 0.5–3 m (1 ft 8 in – 9 ft 10 in) with stems that are square in cross-section and densely covered with silvery, greyish-green hairs. The leaves are sessile, linear to narrow egg-shaped with the narrower end towards the base, densely covered with silvery, greyish-green hairs, 7–36 mm (0.28–1.42 in) long and 1–2.5 mm (0.039–0.098 in) wide. The flowers are arranged singly in four to twenty leaf axils near the ends of branchlets, each flower on a densely hairy pedicel 0.9–3.3 mm (0.035–0.130 in) long. The sepals form a green to cream-coloured, hairy tube tinged with maroon and 1.8–4 mm (0.071–0.157 in) long with two lobes, the lower lobe broadly egg-shaped, 2–3 mm (0.079–0.118 in) long and 2–4 mm (0.079–0.157 in) wide, the upper lobe 3.5–5.5 mm (0.14–0.22 in) long and 2.5–6.5 mm (0.098–0.256 in) wide. The petals form a white to cream-coloured tube 6.5–9 mm (0.26–0.35 in) long with mauve to purple striations inside. The lower lip has three lobes, the centre lobe spatula-shaped, 3.5–6.5 mm (0.14–0.26 in) long and 2.5–5.5 mm (0.098–0.217 in) wide and the side lobes 2.2–5 mm (0.087–0.197 in) long and 1.5–3.5 mm (0.059–0.138 in) wide. The upper lip has two lobes 2.6–5 mm (0.10–0.20 in) long and about 3–7.5 mm (0.12–0.30 in) wide. Flowering occurs from March to October.

== Taxonomy ==
Prostanthera althoferi was first formally described in 1988 by Barry Conn in the journal Nuytsia from specimens collected near Leonora in 1975. The specific epithet (althoferi) honours George Althofer. In the same journal, Conn described two subspecies and the names are accepted by the Australian Plant Census:

- Prostanthera althoferi B.J.Conn subsp. althoferi has leaves 7–16 mm (0.28–0.63 in) long;
- Prostanthera althoferi subsp. longifolia B.J.Conn has leaves 20–36 mm (0.79–1.42 in) long.

== Distribution and habitat ==
This mintbush grows on sandplains, granite outcrops, low sandy rises and dunes. Subspecies althoferi is restricted to Western Australia where it is found in the Avon Wheatbelt, Coolgardie, Great Victoria Desert, Murchison and Yalgoo biogeographic regions. Subspecies longifolia occurs in the southern part of the Northern Territory and the northern arid and western pastoral regions and Eyre Peninsula in South Australia.

== Conservation status ==
Prostanthera althoferi subsp. althoferi is classified as "not threatened" by the Western Australian Government Department of Parks and Wildlife.
