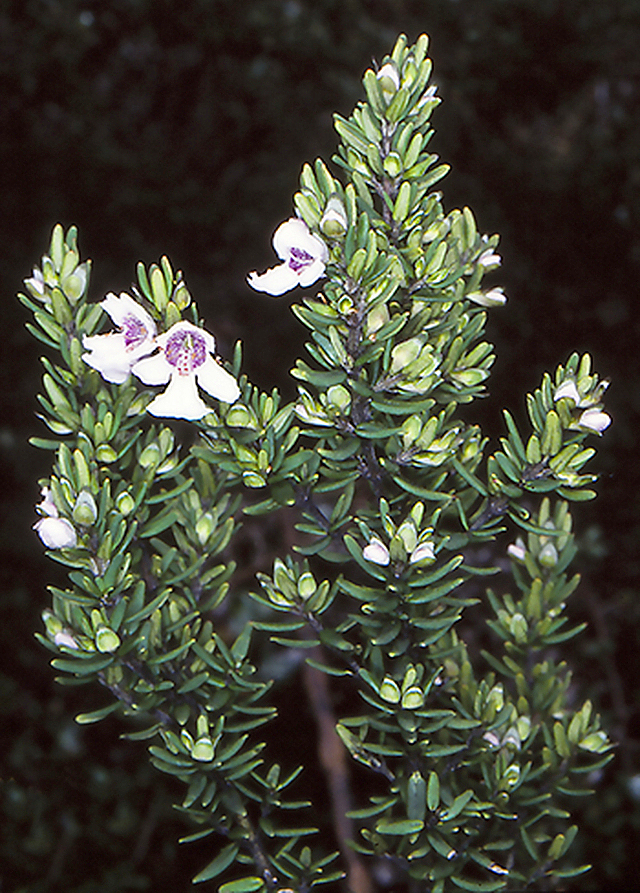
- In Deua National Park

Scientific classification
- Kingdom: Plantae
- Clade: Tracheophytes
- Clade: Angiosperms
- Clade: Eudicots
- Clade: Asterids
- Order: Lamiales
- Family: Lamiaceae
- Genus: Prostanthera
- Species: P. phylicifolia

Binomial name
- Prostanthera phylicifolia F.Muell.
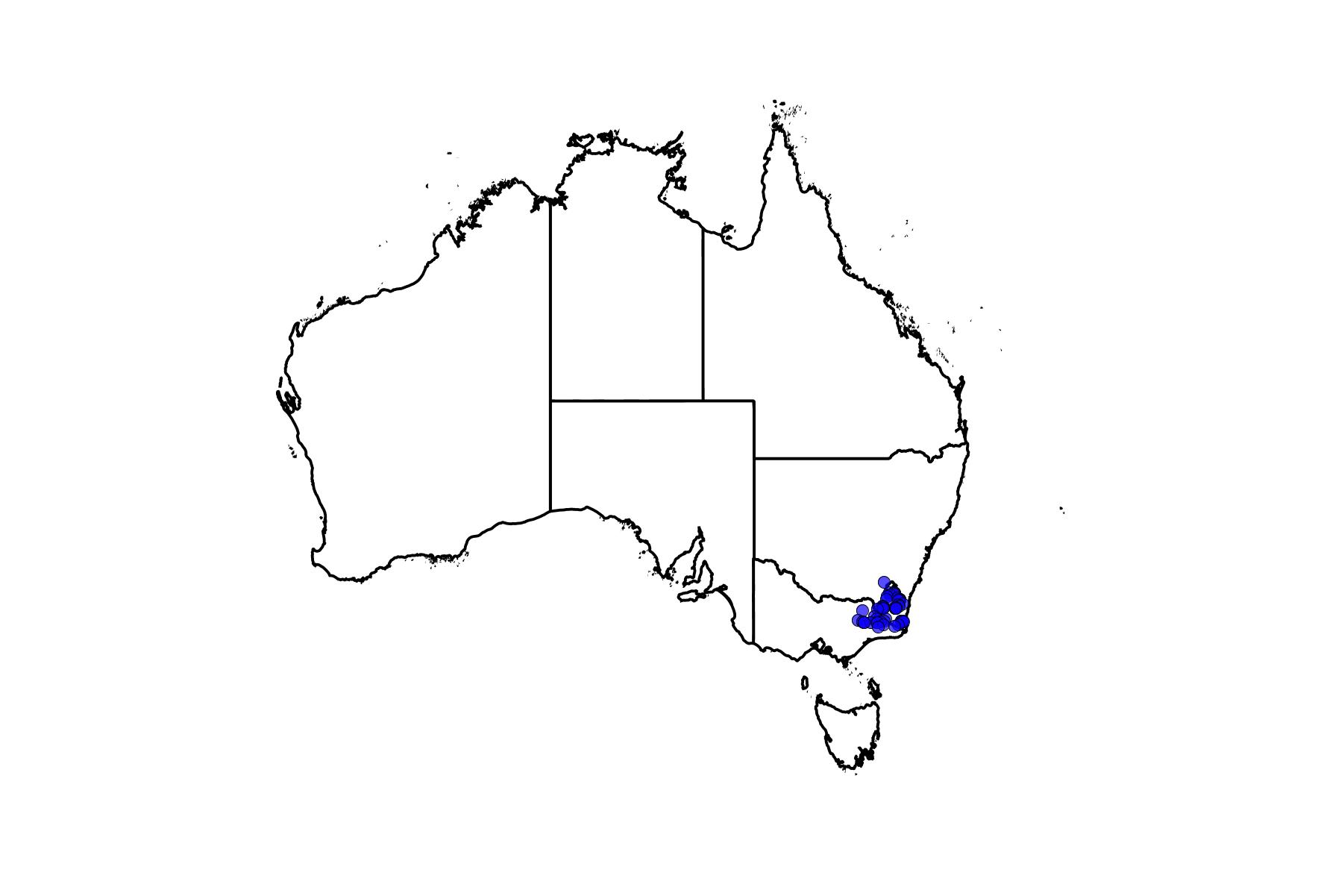
- Occurrence data from AVH

= Prostanthera phylicifolia =

Spiked mint-bush

Species of shrub

Prostanthera phylicifolia, commonly known as spiked mint-bush, is a species of plant in the family Lamiaceae. It is an erect shrub with four-ridged branches, narrow egg-shaped to oval leaves and white or pale lilac-coloured flowers with purple and yellow spots.

== Description ==
Prostanthera phylicifolia is an erect, compact to spreading shrub that typically grows to a height of 0.5–2 m (1 ft 8 in – 6 ft 7 in) and has four-ridged, slightly aromatic branches. The leaves are narrow egg-shaped to oval, 5–15 mm (0.20–0.59 in) long and 1.5–4 mm (0.059–0.157 in) wide on a petiole up to 1 mm (0.039 in) long. The flowers are arranged near the ends of the branchlets with bracteoles 2.5 mm (0.098 in) long at the base. The sepals are 4–5 mm (0.16–0.20 in) long forming a tube 2–3 mm (0.079–0.118 in) long with two lobes, the upper lobe 2–4 mm (0.079–0.157 in) long. The petals are 12–15 mm (0.47–0.59 in) long and white to pale lilac with purple spots inside the tube and yellow spots on the lower lobe.

== Taxonomy ==
Prostanthera phylicifolia was first formally described by Victorian Government botanist Ferdinand von Mueller in 1858 in his book Fragmenta Phytographiae Australiae from material collected from "Mt McFarlane" (now Macfarlane's Lookout) near Omeo in northern Victoria and the “Maneroo” (present-day Monaro) region of New South Wales.

George Bentham's 1870 revision of the genus Prostanthera broadened the species' circumscription, by citing specimens from the New England region of New South Wales and the Glass House Mountains, Queensland, in addition to the Victorian type locality. Bentham's broad circumscription subsequently caused taxonomic confusion, and populations from northern New South Wales and southern Queensland were variously identified as either P. phylicifolia or P. scutellarioides, despite considerable morphological differences between them. Molecular phylogenetic studies later confirmed Bentham's circumscription as erroneous, demonstrating that P. phylicifolia is restricted to localities cited in the original description, while populations from northern New South Wales and Queensland are more closely allied to P. scutellarioides. The species was lectotypified in 2023 to restrict application of the name P. phylicifolia to populations in southern New South Wales and Victoria, as described in Mueller's original description.

== Evolutionary relationships ==
Molecular studies have demonstrated that P. phylicifolia is closely related to Prostanthera gilesii and Prostanthera volucris, the latter published in 2023 and accepted by the International Plant Name Index and by Plants of the World Online as of June 2024.

== Distribution and habitat ==
This species occurs on hillsides and granite outcrops in heath and woodland in south-eastern New South Wales, the Australian Capital Territory and north-eastern Victoria.

== Use in horticulture ==
Prostanthera 'Poorinda Snow Queen' and 'Poorinda Ballerina', hybrid crosses of P. lasianthos and P. phylicifolia, are cultivated.
