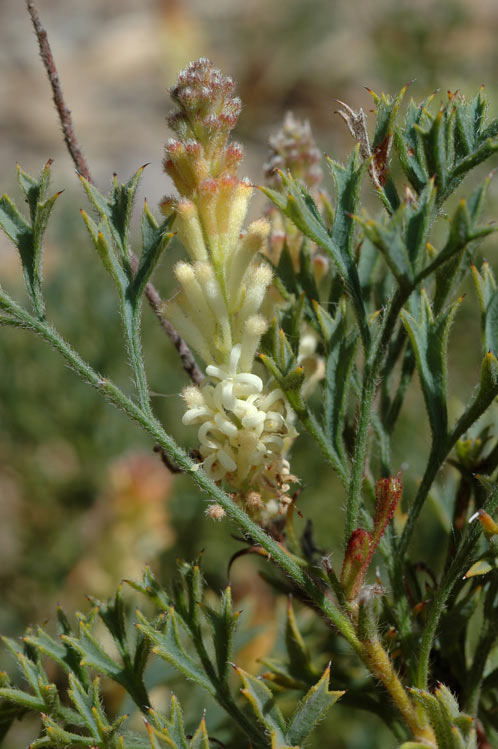
- In Kings Park, Perth

Conservation status
- Endangered (EPBC Act)

Scientific classification
- Kingdom: Plantae
- Clade: Embryophytes
- Clade: Tracheophytes
- Clade: Spermatophytes
- Clade: Angiosperms
- Clade: Eudicots
- Order: Proteales
- Family: Proteaceae
- Genus: Grevillea
- Species: G. althoferorum

Binomial name
- Grevillea althoferorum Olde & Marriott

Subspecies
- Grevillea althoferorum subsp. althoferorum; Grevillea althoferorum subsp. fragilis

= Grevillea althoferorum =

Species of shrub endemic to Western Australia

Grevillea althoferorum, commonly known as the split-leaved grevillea, is a species of flowering plant in the family Proteaceae and is endemic to a restricted area of Western Australia. It is a compact, rounded shrub with sharply pointed, deeply lobed leaves and dull yellow flowers with a creamy-yellow style.

== Description ==
Grevillea althoferorum is a compact, rounded shrub that typically grows to a height of 30–50 cm (12–20 in) and has trailing stems up to 3 m (9.8 ft) long. Its leaves are 30–75 mm (1.2–3.0 in) long and 10–50 mm (0.39–1.97 in) wide in outline, but deeply lobed. There are three to seven main lobes, usually further divided, the end-lobes sharply-pointed, triangular, 20–25 mm (0.79–0.98 in) long and 1–5 mm (0.039–0.197 in) wide. The flowers are arranged in erect, cylindrical groups 20–50 mm (0.79–1.97 in) long on the ends of branches. The flowers are dull yellow and hairy on the outside and the pistil is 6.0–6.5 mm (0.24–0.26 in) long with a creamy-yellow style. Flowering occurs in September and October and the fruit is an oblong follicle 9.5–11 mm (0.37–0.43 in) long.

== Taxonomy ==
Grevillea althoferorum was first formally described in 1993 by Peter M. Olde and Neil R. Marriott in the journal Nuytsia, based on plant material collected by Olde near Eneabba in 1991. The specific epithet (althoferorum) honours Peter and Hazel Althofer of Burrendong Arboretum.

In 2008, Olde and Marriott described two subspecies of G. althoferorum in a later edition of Nuytsia and the names are accepted by the Australian Plant Census:

- Grevillea althoferorum Olde & Marriott subsp. althoferorum has rigid, sharply leaf lobes 10–30 mm (0.39–1.18 in) wide with spines 2.5–3.5 mm (0.098–0.138 in) long;
- Grevillea althoferorum subsp. fragilis Olde & Marriott has brittle, less sharply-pointed leaf lobes 2.5–3.5 mm (0.098–0.138 in) wide with spines 0.5–1.5 mm (0.020–0.059 in) long.

== Distribution and habitat ==
Subspecies althoferorum grows in open kwongan and is only known from a population near Eneabba. Subspecies fragilis grows in woodland and is only known from a small population near Bullsbrook.

== Conservation status ==
The species is listed as endangered under the Commonwealth Government Environment Protection and Biodiversity Conservation Act 1999 (EPBC) Act. Threats to this species include weed invasion, grazing from rabbits, dieback disease (Phytophthora megasperma), land clearing for road, track and firebreak maintenance activities, inappropriate fire regimes, chemical drift from herbicides and fertilizers and lack of genetic diversity.

Both subspecies of G. althoferorum are listed as threatened flora (declared rare flora — extant) by the Department of Biodiversity, Conservation and Attractions and an Interim Recovery Plan has been prepared for G. althoferorum.
