= Burrendong Botanic Garden and Arboretum =

Park in New South Wales, Australia

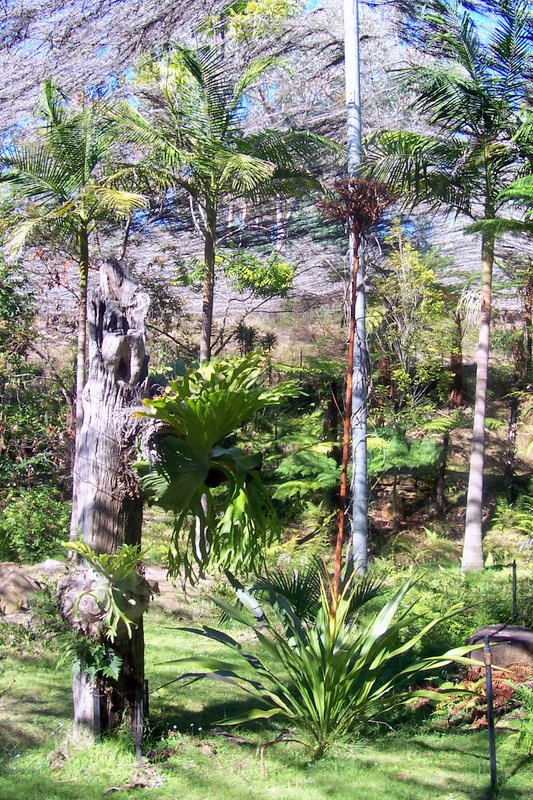
- Fern Gully at Burrendong Arboretum
- Interactive map of Burrendong Botanic Garden and Arboretum
- Type: Botanical
- Location: Mumbil, New South Wales
- Coordinates: 32.707896°S 149.11952°E
- Area: 167 hectares (410 acres)
- Opened: 1964
- Plants: Australian natives
- Website: Burrendong Arboretum

The Burrendong Botanic Garden and Arboretum is located near Mumbil, south-east of Wellington in the Central West region of New South Wales, Australia. Established in 1964 as a result of the efforts of George and Peter Althofer, the 167 ha garden opens from 7.30 am to sunset every day of the year

== Facilities and activities ==
Picnic areas, toilets, views of the lake, varied walks, plant sales, children's treasure hunts and guided tours are available at certain times. Native animals and birds may be seen on site, such as kangaroos and emus. Special features are the plantings of rainforest plants in the Fern Gully, the Mint Bushes and the collection of plants from Western Australia.

== See also ==
- List of botanical gardens
- Mayfield Garden, another garden in Central West NSW
