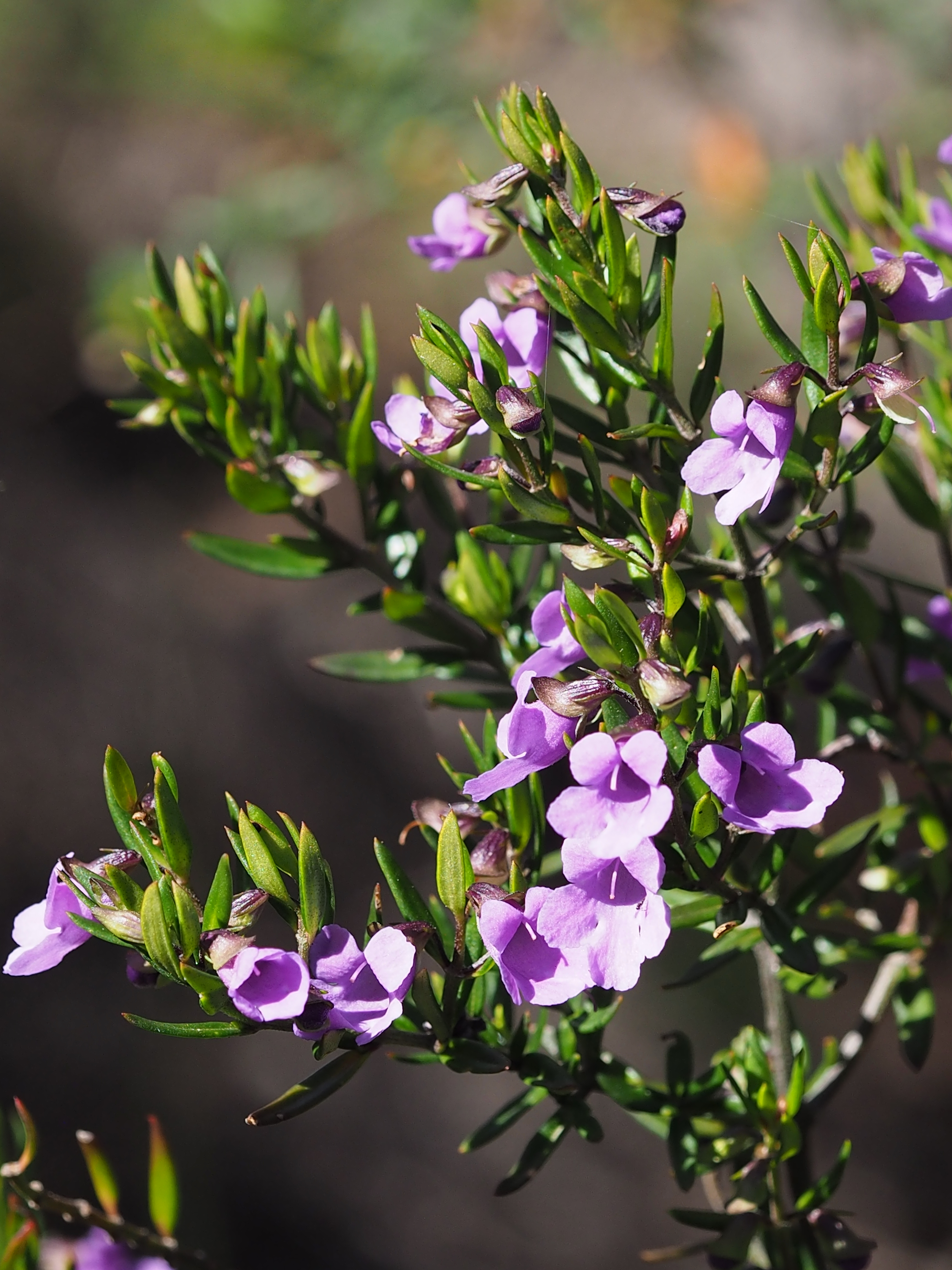
- In the Gibraltar Range National Park

Scientific classification
- Kingdom: Plantae
- Clade: Tracheophytes
- Clade: Angiosperms
- Clade: Eudicots
- Clade: Asterids
- Order: Lamiales
- Family: Lamiaceae
- Genus: Prostanthera
- Species: P. scutellarioides

Binomial name
- Prostanthera scutellarioides (R.Br.) Briq.
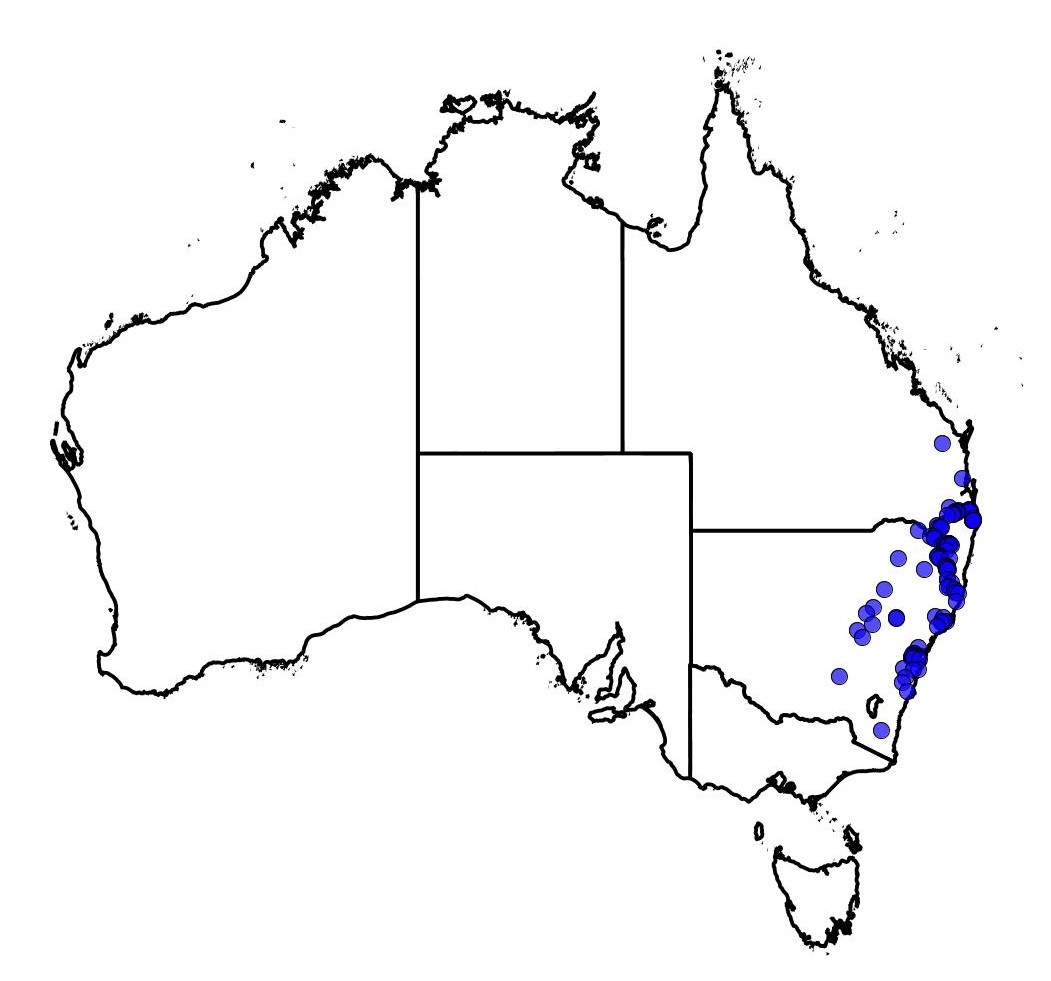
- Occurrence data from AVH

Synonyms
- Chilodia scutellarioides R.Br.; Prostanthera empetrifolia Sieber ex Spreng.

= Prostanthera scutellarioides =

Species of plant

Prostanthera scutellarioides is a species of flowering plant that is endemic to New South Wales. It is an erect, or low-lying, faintly aromatic shrub with linear leaves and pale to deep mauve flowers arranged in leaf axils.

== Description ==
Prostanthera scutellarioides is an erect or low-lying, faintly aromatic shrub that typically grows to a height of 0.3–2.5 m (1 ft 0 in – 8 ft 2 in) and has ridged branches. The leaves are linear, 6–25 mm (0.24–0.98 in) long and 0.5–2 mm (0.020–0.079 in) wide gradually tapering to a petiole up to 0.5 mm (0.020 in) long. The flowers are arranged in leaf axils with bracteoles about 2.5 mm (0.098 in) long at the base. The sepals are 3–4.5 mm (0.12–0.18 in) long forming a tube 1.7–2.5 mm (0.067–0.098 in) long with two lobes, the upper lobe 1.5–2.5 mm (0.059–0.098 in) long. The petals are pale to deep mauve and 7–8 mm (0.28–0.31 in) long. Flowering mainly occurs from spring to early summer.

== Taxonomy ==
This mintbush was first formally described in 1810 by Robert Brown who gave it the name Chiloides scutellarioides in Prodromus Florae Novae Hollandiae et Insulae Van Diemen. In 1895, John Isaac Briquet changed the name to Prostanthera scutellarioides, publishing the change in Die Natürlichen Pflanzenfamilien.

== Distribution and habitat ==
Prostanthera scutellarioides grows in woodland and forest on the coast and tablelands of New South Wales north from the Windsor district.
