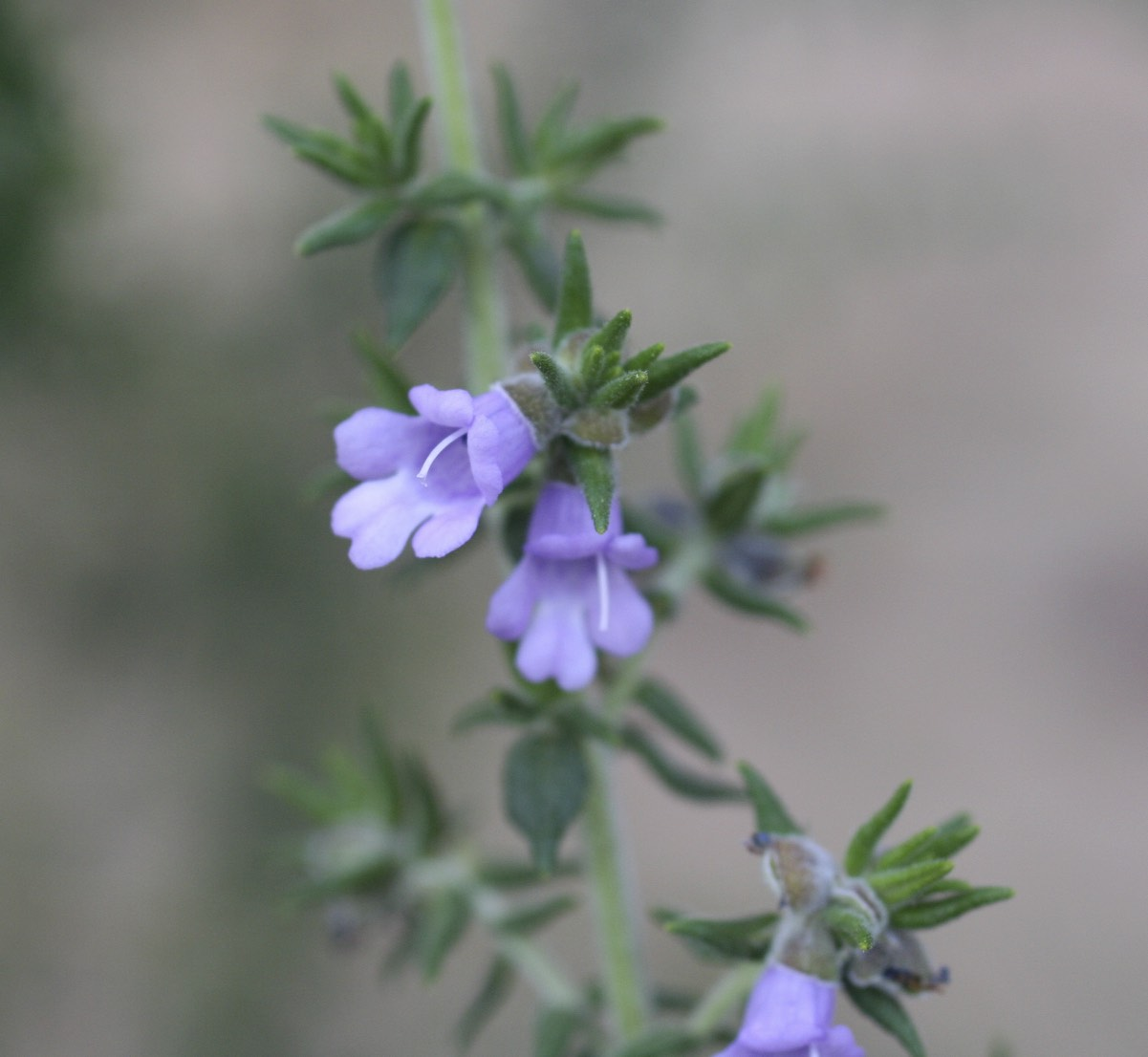
- Near the Sandstone Caves in the Pilliga forest

Scientific classification
- Kingdom: Plantae
- Clade: Tracheophytes
- Clade: Angiosperms
- Clade: Eudicots
- Clade: Asterids
- Order: Lamiales
- Family: Lamiaceae
- Genus: Prostanthera
- Species: P. granitica

Binomial name
- Prostanthera granitica Maiden & Betche
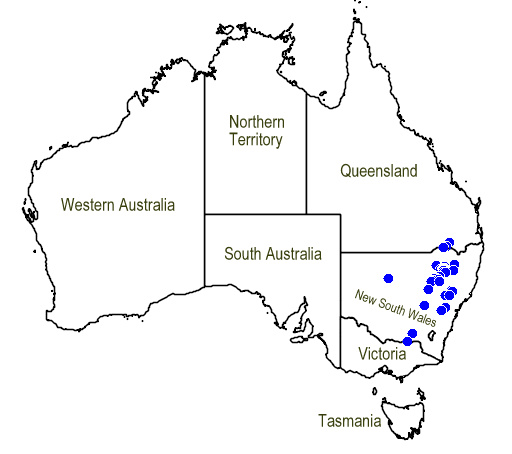
- Occurrence data from AVH

= Prostanthera granitica =

Granite mintbush

Species of flowering plant

Prostanthera granitica, commonly known as the granite mintbush, is a species of flowering plant in the family Lamiaceae and is endemic to eastern Australia. It is a spreading shrub with egg-shaped leaves with the edges rolled under, and purple to violet flowers.

== Description ==
Prostanthera granitica is a spreading shrub that typically grows to 0.6–1 m (2 ft 0 in – 3 ft 3 in) high and 2 m (6 ft 7 in) wide and has densely hairy branches. The leaves are light green, hairy, egg-shaped with the edges rolled under, 6–15 mm (0.24–0.59 in) long and 2–5 mm (0.079–0.197 in) wide and sessile or on a petiole up to 1 mm (0.039 in) long. The flowers are arranged singly in upper leaf axils with bracteoles about 2 mm (0.079 in) long at the base. The sepals are 5 mm (0.20 in) long and form a tube 3 mm (0.12 in) wide with two lobes, the upper lobe 2 mm (0.079 in) long. The petals are purple to mid-violet, occasionally white, 8–10 mm (0.31–0.39 in) long. Flowering occurs from August to December.

== Taxonomy ==
Prostanthera granitica was first formally described in 1905 by Joseph Maiden and Ernst Betche in the Proceedings of the Linnean Society of New South Wales.

== Distribution and habitat ==
Granite mint bush grows in heath and forest in rocky places, mainly on the tablelands, slopes and plains of New South Wales.
