= Mumbil, New South Wales =

Mumbil
- Town
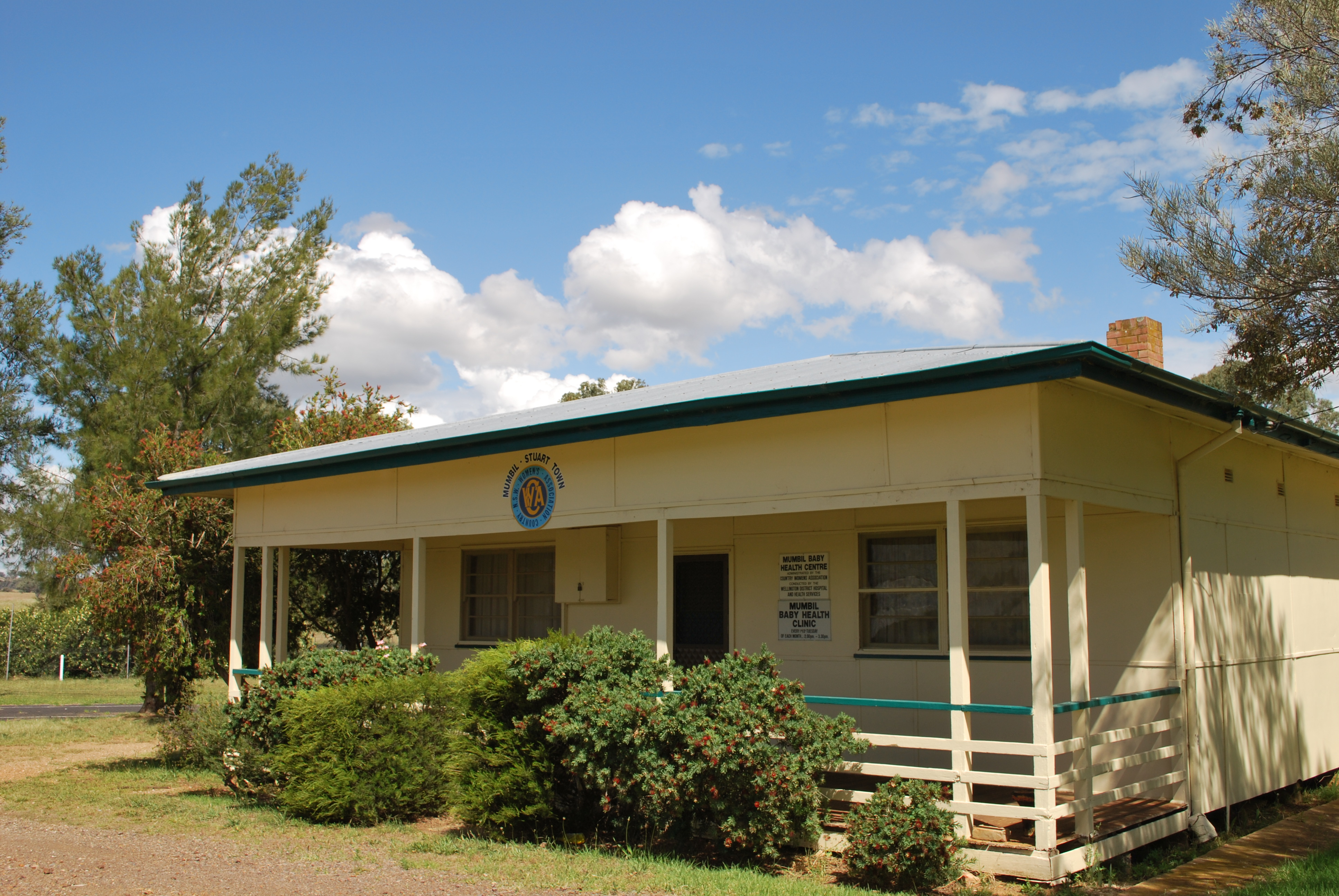
- Mumbil-Stuart Town CWA building

- Coordinates: 32°43′0″S 149°03′0″E
- Country: Australia
- State: New South Wales
- LGA: Dubbo Regional Council
- Location: 327 km (203 mi) NW of Sydney; 70 km (43 mi) N of Orange; 25 km (16 mi) SE of Molong

Government
  - State electorate: Dubbo
  - Federal division: Parkes

Population
  - Total: 421 (2011 census)
- Postcode: 2820

Mumbil is a town in the east of central New South Wales, Australia. The town is within Dubbo Regional Council, part of the Orana Region, 327 kilometres (203 mi) north west of the state capital, Sydney.

At the 2011 census, Mumbil and the surrounding area had a population of 421.

== History ==
In 1950 construction commenced on the Burrendong Dam. The dam workforce was living in Mumbil and led to the development of many new services in the town, including electricity, reticulated water, and garbage collection. A public hall and church were built and the school expanded. A number of new stores opened.
