= George Althofer =

Australian botanist and poet

George William Francis Althofer OAM (1903–1993) was an Australian botanist, nurseryman, author and poet, with a special interest in the mint-bush genus Prostanthera as well as other Australian native plants, who founded the Burrendong Botanic Garden and Arboretum. The standard author abbreviation Althofer is used to indicate this person as the author when citing a botanical name.

== Life ==
Althofer was born at Dripstone in the Wellington local government area of central west New South Wales. He attended school locally, in Dripstone, then Wellington and Mumbil.

Althofer grew up working on his father's farm and orchard, becoming an orchardist himself. In 1938 he established a native plant nursery at his property "Nindethana" at Dripstone. Inspired by the American example of the Arnold Arboretum, and assisted by his brother Peter, he lobbied for the establishment of a similar institution with a focus on Australian native plants. As a consequence, the 167-hectare (410-acre) Burrendong Botanic Garden and Arboretum on the foreshore of Lake Burrendong, near Wellington, opened in 1964.

== Publications ==
Books and collections of poetry by Althofer include:

- 1936 – The road to Burrendong and other verses
- 1937 – Drifting. (Music by Edward H. Tyrrell, words by George Althofer). The Manly Daily: Sydney
- 1956 – The story of Nindethana and new and enlarged catalogue of Australian native plants. Nindethana Nursery: Dripstone
- 1966 – Trees to beat the droughts: being a guide to the planting of hardy species on the western slopes and plains. (With "Blue Gum" of "The Land"). Land Newspaper: Sydney
- n.d. (1970s) – The dream of Ronal and other verses
- 1978 – Cradle of incense : the story of Australian Prostanthera. Stanley Smith Memorial Publication Fund: Australia.
- 1980 – Ironbark chips of Stuart Town, Mumbil, Dripstone and the Burrendong region. Macquarie Publications: Dubbo.
- 1980 – The flora of Mt Arthur Reserve, Wellington, N.S.W. (Illustrated by G.J. Harden). Trustees of Mt Arthur Reserve: Wellington, NSW.
- 1983 – Laughter and tears from the golden years, or, Some more ironbark chips. Macquarie Publications: Dubbo
- 1985 – The Dripstone story : being a comprehensive social history of Dripstone and district, from the earliest times to the present day. Wellington Historical Society: Wellington, NSW.
- 1992 – The collected poems of G. W. Althofer.
