= Kim Power =

Australian academic and feminist theologian

- Occupations: Feminist theologian; Church historian

Academic background
- Education: La Trobe University (PhD); University of Divinity (MTheol); University of Melbourne (BA)
- Thesis: The Secret Garden: the Meaning and Function of the hortus conclusus in Ambrose of Milan's Homilies on Virginity (1997)

Academic work
- Discipline: Church history
- Sub-discipline: Patristics
- Institutions: Australian Catholic University

Kim E. Power is an Australian academic, feminist theologian and church historian, who was a co-founder of the Golding Centre for Women's History, Theology and Spirituality at the Australian Catholic University.

== Education ==
Kim Power completed a BA at the University of Melbourne and a BTheol and MTheol at the Melbourne College of Divinity (now University of Divinity). She went on to complete a PhD at La Trobe University in the School of Archaeology and Historical Studies, Faculty of Humanities and Social Sciences.

Her master's thesis, completed in 1990 was titled, "Augustine's theology of women: influence and implications". This was later published as Veiled Desire: Augustine on Women in 1996. One reviewer of this book summarised Power's contribution, saying "Her service is to provide insight in a historically responsible way into how the Augustinian heritage still pervades Christian discussions of women."

Power's doctoral thesis, completed in 1997, was titled, The Secret Garden: the Meaning and Function of the hortus conclusus in Ambrose of Milan's Homilies on Virginity.

== Career ==
Power was a senior Fulbright scholar in residence at Notre Dame of Maryland University from 1997 to 1998. During her academic career, Power's research focussed on gender, culture and religion and how that impacted the role of women in society. Her education had provided her with a strong background in patristics, having studied several of the early Church Fathers.

Power was one of the co-founders of the Golding Centre for Women's History, Theology and Spirituality, which was situated within the School of Theology at the Australian Catholic University (ACU), where she was based at the Melbourne campus. The other co-founders included Sophie McGrath and Rosa MacGinley. This enabled the centre to have team members across multiple ACU campuses in Brisbane, Sydney and Melbourne. The Golding Centre was named in honour of three Australian Catholic activists, Annie and Belle Golding and their married sister Kate Dwyer. An early major research project of the Golding Centre was to explore "The Catholic Community and Women's Suffrage in Australia", a project that also included Katharine Massam as a team member. Through the Golding Centre seven doctoral dissertations were successfully supervised. The centre held an annual colloquium and published a regular newsletter.

In 1997 Power delivered the Charles Strong Lecture, an annual lecture of the Charles Strong Trust by a notable scholar in religious studies or a related field.

In 2001 the Australian Association for the Study of Religion (AASR) Women's Caucus invited Power to give the annual Penny Magee Memorial Lecture. The title of her talk was, "Luce Irigaray and the Emergence of a Divine Horizon for Women".

Power has been interviewed several times for radio programs presented by the Australian Broadcasting Commission (ABC) Radio National.

== Personal life ==
After her retirement, Power became president of the Sunflower Foundation, a non government organisation (NGO) that she founded with her husband, which seeks to empower girls in developing countries through education.

== Select publications ==
=== Books ===
- Power, Kim. Veiled Desire: Augustine on Women. New York: Continuum, 1996. https://worldcat.org/oclc/35782085
- Power, Kim. Heavenly Bodies?: The Ambiguity of the Body in Religious Discourse and Practice. Adelaide, S. Aust.: Charles Strong Memorial Trust, 1998. https://worldcat.org/oclc/39291929
- Hogan, Carol, Kim Power, Anne F Elvey and Claire Renkin, eds. Reinterpreting the Eucharist: Explorations in Feminist Theology and Ethics. Gender, Theology, and Spirituality. London: Routledge, 2014. https://worldcat.org/oclc/893333348

=== Book chapters ===
- Power, Kim. "From Ecclesiology to Mariology: Patristic Traces and Innovation in the Speculum Virginum", In Listen, Daughter: the Speculum Virginum and the Formation of Religious Women in the Middle Ages, edited by Constant J. Mews. New York: Palgrave, 2001. p. 85-110. doi:10.1007/978-1-137-07943-5 ISBN 978-1-349-63327-2

=== Journal articles ===
- Power, Kim. "Embodiment and Complementarity." Women-Church: An Australian Journal of Feminist Studies in Religion no. 35 (2004): 24–30. https://search.informit.org/doi/10.3316/ielapa.200411164 Digitised version of no. 35 (2004) available on JSTOR Open Community Collections University of Divinity Digital Collections, Mannix Library.
