= Nellie Martel =

English-Australian suffragist (1855–1940)

Ellen Alma "Nellie" Martel
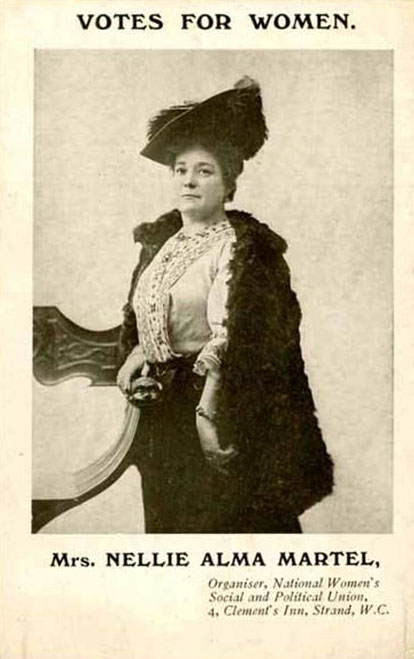
- Postcard of Mrs. Nellie Alma Martel c. 1906
- Born: Ellen Alma Charleston; 30 September 1855; Beacon, England
- Died: 11 August 1940 (aged 84); London, England
- Occupation: Suffragist
- Spouse: Charles Martel (m. 1885; died in 1935)

Ellen Alma Martel, (née Charleston; 30 September 1855 – 11 August 1940) was an English-Australian suffragist and elocutionist. She stood for the Senate at the 1903 federal election, one of the first four women to stand for federal parliament.

== Life ==
Born at Beacon in Cornwall to hammer-man John Charleston and Elizabeth, née Williams (one of her siblings was future Australian Senator David Charleston), she migrated to Australia in 1879, arriving in Sydney in January 1880. She married a Guernsey widower, photographer Charles Martel, at Christ Church Cathedral in Newcastle on 4 April 1885; the couple returned to Britain in 1889. While in England she witnessed her sister's marriage to the engineer Alfred Goninan.

After touring France and Italy, Martel and her husband returned to Sydney in 1891 and both joined the Womanhood Suffrage League (WSL); she was elected to its council and organising committee in 1894 and to the finance committee in 1895.

Her husband had been declared bankrupt in September 1893, after an unwise business venture; although he was granted a certificate of discharge in March 1894, Martel worked as an elocution teacher from their home in Paddington and paid off the mortgage by 1900, by which time she was teaching from George Street.

During this time she was active in the campaign for female suffrage, particularly in New South Wales. Martel also became known for her "rich contralto" voice and gave recitations and musical performances, at the monthly "At Homes" she and her husband held at the Hotel Arcadia.

In September 1901, she became founding president of the Women's Progressive Association of New South Wales, formed party in response to Rose Scott's domination of the WSL, along with Annie Golding, Belle Golding, and Kate Dwyer.

In April 1903, she was elected president of the Women's Liberal and Reform Association, and she was also elected to the finance committee of the Australian Free Trade League in October.

== Election ==
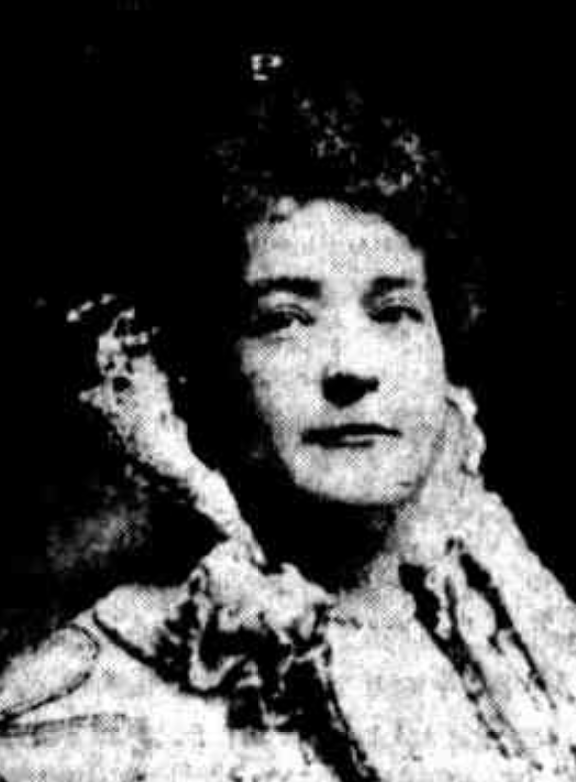
Nellie Alma Martel c1903, first woman to nominate for the Australian Senate

Martel was one of the four women who contested the 1903 federal election, the first at which women were eligible to stand. Although Martel sought the endorsement of the Women's Social Political League, this was denied after the Free Trade Party instead endorsed three men, and the league declared that "the time is not yet ripe for women candidates".

Martel stood for the Senate regardless as an independent candidate and campaigned strongly in Newcastle, Tamworth, Lambton and Maitland.

Despite standing as a women's candidate she expressed opposition to women standing for parliament if they would be neglecting their domestic responsibilities; by this time her husband was in a nursing home. She opposed the Political Labour League, particularly its caucus structure and support for the minimum wage, and advocated equal pay for women as a method of maintaining a male dominance in the workplace.

Other causes she supported included free trade, private industry, irrigation, foreign language teaching and the White Australia policy; ultimately she received 18,502 votes (6%).

== Return to England ==
Charles returned to England in 1904 and Nellie later that year on 27 July; she remained a frequent subject of Louisa Lawson's Dawn. In London she became notorious as a woman who had stood for parliament, and joined Emmeline Pankhurst's Women's Social and Political Union (WSPU) in May 1905. Martel read a petition of protest at a meeting following the delay of a women's enfranchisement bill. By the summer of 1905, when Martel visited Manchester, she found its entire membership had barely reached thirty. In 1906 Martel became a member of the WSPU's central committee, publicising the democratic rights enjoyed by Australian women.

On 3 October 1906, she was arrested, with Anne Cobden Sanderson, and Minnie Baldock at Parliament, and sentenced to two months in prison. In 1907 Martel was involved with in the unsuccessful campaign against the sitting Liberal candidate at Jarrow by-election, with Jessie Stephenson and Mary Gawthorpe with Christabel Pankhurst.

She and Pankhurst successfully campaigned Nelly Crocker, Rachel Barrett, Aeta Lamb and Emmeline Pankhurst against an anti-enfranchisement candidate in Devon in January 1908, but Martel left the WSPU later that year. Martel's "strenuous advocacy" of a Unionist candidate in Sunderland in 1918 was credited with assisting his re-election.

Charles died in 1935, and Nellie at her home in Notting Hill on 11 August 1940.

== Works ==
- "Women's Votes in New Zealand and Australia". The Case for Women's Suffrage: 140–153. 1907. Wikidata Q107261467.
