= Rosa MacGinley =

Australian nun and historian (1931–2018)

- Born: Mary Rose MacGinley; 1931
- Died: November 11, 2018 (aged 86–87)
- Occupations: Church historian; Religious sister

Academic background
- Education: University of Queensland PhD; University of Queensland (BA)
- Thesis: Catholicism in Queensland, 1910–1935: A Social History (1982)

Academic work
- Discipline: Church History
- Sub-discipline: Women religious
- Institutions: Australian Catholic University

Mary Rose MacGinley pbvm (1931 – November 11, 2018) was an Australian Presentation sister, academic and historian of women religious. She was the co-founder of the Golding Centre for Women’s History, Theology and Spirituality at the Australian Catholic University.

== Early life and education ==
Mary Rose MacGinley, better known as Rosa, was born in 1931, the third of four children. Her father James MacGinley fostered a love of history by reading to them as children.

MacGinley completed a MA at the University of Queensland in 1972. The title of her thesis was ‘A Study of Irish Migration to, and Settlement in, Queensland, 1885-1912.’ She went on to complete a PhD at the same university in the School of History, Philosophy, Religion, and Classics in 1982. The title of her dissertation was Catholicism in Queensland, 1910–1935: A Social History.

== Career ==
MacGinley felt drawn to the religious life and entered the Congregation of the Sisters of the Presentation at Longreach, Queensland on 23 April 1951. She completer her novitiate and was professed as a Presentation Sister in 1954. She was Formation Director from 1973–1976.

From 1954–1967 MacGinley was the Head of School at St Ursula's College, a girl's secondary school in Yeppoon, Queensland. She was later appointed to St Rita's College in Clayfield, where she taught for a further 5 years.

MacGinley was a founding member of the Institute of Religious Studies in Sydney in 1976.

A keen historian all her life, MacGinley was an active member of the Australian Catholic Historical Society and served as Vice-President and Journal Editor. She was the first female president of the Brisbane Catholic Historical Society. She contributed to the Brisbane Catholic Historical Journal, writing about "Religious women in Queensland" (vol. 1 1998), "Presentation Sisters in Queensland – A Centenary Reflection" (vol. 7, 2000), and "‘The Age’ 1892+: an early Brisbane Catholic Newspaper" (vol. 10, 2006).

MacGinley's book A Dynamic of Hope: Institutes of Women Religious in Australia (2002) surveys the work of Australian religious orders, and was described by one reviewer as "a magnificent contribution to the history of women in Australia".

MacGinley was one of the co-founders of the Golding Centre for Women's History, Theology and Spirituality in 2003. The Centre was situated within the School of Theology at the Australian Catholic University (ACU). MacGinley was based at the Brisbane campus of ACU where she was a Research Fellow from 2001. The other co-founders of the centre included Sophie McGrath and Kim Power. This enabled the Centre to have team members across multiple ACU campuses in Brisbane, Sydney and Melbourne. The Golding Centre was named in honour of three Australian Catholic activists, Annie and Belle Golding and their married sister Kate Dwyer. An early major research project of the Golding Centre was to explore 'The Catholic Community and Women's Suffrage in Australia', a project that also included Katharine Massam as a team member. Through the Golding Centre seven doctoral dissertations were successfully supervised. The Centre held an annual colloquium and published a regular newsletter.

== Honours ==
MacGinley was awarded an Order of Australia (OAM) Medal in 2012 for outstanding service in the field of theological education, including her work with the Australian Catholic University.

== Death and legacy ==
Rosa died on 11 November 2018 at the Presentation Convent in Herston, Brisbane.

== Select publications ==
=== Books ===
- MacGinley, M. R. A Dynamic of Hope: Institutes of Women Religious in Australia. 2nd ed. with minor corrections ed. Darlinghurst, NSW: Crossing Press, 2002. https://worldcat.org/oclc/52729175
- MacGinley, M. R. Ancient Tradition – New World: Dominican Sisters in Eastern Australia 1867–1958. Strathfield, N.S.W.: St Pauls Publications, 2009. https://worldcat.org/oclc/399591721
- MacGinley, M. R. Roads to Sion: Presentation Sisters in Australia, 1866–1980. Clayfield, Qld.: Sisters of the Presentation of the Blessed Virgin Mary, 1983. https://worldcat.org/oclc/28991728
