= Sophie McGrath =

Australian historian and Sister of Mercy (died 2020)

- Born: 1932 or 1933
- Died: 13 June 2020 (aged 87)
- Occupations: Historian; Religious sister

Academic background
- Education: Macquarie University PhD; University of Sydney (MEd); University of New England (Australia) (Diploma of Education); University of Sydney (BA)
- Thesis: Women Religious in the History of Australia : A Case Study -- the Sisters of Mercy, Parramatta (1987)

Academic work
- Discipline: History
- Sub-discipline: Women's History
- Institutions: Australian Catholic University

Madeleine Sophie McGrath (died 13 June 2020) was an Australian historian and religious Sister of Mercy, who was the Director of the Golding Centre for Women's History, Theology and Spirituality at the Australian Catholic University from 2003 to 2020.

== Education ==
Sophie McGrath was the daughter of Eileen and John McGrath, and had two siblings Marie and Patricia.

McGrath completed a Bachelor of Arts at the University of Sydney, a Diploma of Education at the University of New England, a Master of Education at the University of Sydney, and a Doctor of Philosophy in history from Macquarie University.

Her doctoral thesis, a centenary history of the Sisters of Mercy, Parramatta, was published by the University of New South Wales press as These Women?: women religious in the history of Australia, the Sisters of Mercy, Parramatta 1888–1988. McGrath also researched and published in the areas of the Christian philosophy of education, the education of Catholic girls, women religious in the history of Australia and feminism and the papacy.

== Career ==
McGrath taught and held leadership positions in several Mercy schools in Sydney and was the school principal at Catherine McAuley in Westmead from 1974 to 1977.The school later named its Sophie McGrath Building in her honour.

Her work as a researcher at the Strathfield Campus of the Australian Catholic University (ACU) commenced in 1982 and she became a Research Fellow in 2000. As a scholar, McGrath was particularly interested in the role and significance of women in the Church. A proposal submitted jointly by McGrath and Rosa MacGinley initially led to the establishment of the Golding Project for Women's History, Theology and Spirituality. In 2003 it was upgraded to the status of a Centre. The Golding Centre for Women's History, Theology and Spirituality was situated within the School of Theology at ACU. McGrath was appointed as the Director of the centre and the founding team included Kim Power, in addition to McGrath and MacGinley, providing team members across multiple ACU campuses in Brisbane, Sydney and Melbourne.

The Golding Centre was named in honour of three Australian Catholic activists, Annie and Belle Golding and their married sister Kate Dwyer. An early major research project of the Golding Centre was to explore 'The Catholic Community and Women's Suffrage in Australia', a project that also included Katharine Massam as a team member. Through the Golding Centre seven doctoral dissertations were successfully supervised. The Centre held an annual colloquium and published a regular newsletter.

McGrath was also a member of the Australian Catholic Historical Society (ACHS) for many years and contributed to the ACHS Journal.

== Death and legacy ==
McGrath died on 13 June 2020 at the age of 87. She was planning to retire at the end of 2020. Former Vice-Chancellor and President Professor at ACU Greg Craven AO GCSG paid tribute to McGrath after her death stating that, “Sophie was a pioneering leader in Catholic academia in Australia, particularly in researching the role of women in the history of the Australian Church landscape. Her work in establishing the Golding Centre for Women’s History at ACU in 2000 was a particular achievement for which she will be remembered.”

== Select publications ==
=== Books ===
- McGrath, Madeleine Sophie. These Women?: Women Religious in the History of Australia: The Sisters of Mercy, Parramatta 1888–1988. Kensington, N.S.W: New South Wales University Press,1990. These women? : women religious in the history of Australia : the Sisters of Mercy Parramatta, 1888-1988 (Book, 1990) [WorldCat.org]. OCLC 23908733.

=== Journal articles ===
- McGrath, Sophie. "Annie Golding Feminist and Catholic, 1904", Women-Church: Australian Journal of Feminist Studies in Religion, no. 13 (1993): 30–34. Digitised version of no. 13 (1993) available on JSTOR Open Community Collections, University of Divinity Digital Collections, Mannix Library
- McGrath, Sophie. “Women Religious in the History of Australia 1888/ 1950: A Case Study, the Sisters of Mercy, Parramatta.” Journal of the Royal Australian Historical Society 81, no. 2 (1995): 195–212.
- McGrath, Sophie. "The Last Word on Pope Joan!", Women-Church: Australian Journal of Feminist Studies in Religion, no. 19 (1996): 23–28. Digitised version of no. 19 (1996) available on JSTOR Open Community Collections, University of Divinity Digital Collections, Mannix Library
- McGrath, Sophie. “Dr Rosa Macginley Pbvm.” Journal of the Australian Catholic Historical Society 40 (2019): 191–96. "Dr Rosa MacGinley pbvm | Journal of the Australian Catholic Historical Society". search.informit.org.
- McGrath, Sophie. "Voices of the women." Compass: a Review of Topical Theology 39, no. 4 (Summer 2005) http://compassreview.org/summer05/6.html
