= Eva Seery =

Australian activist

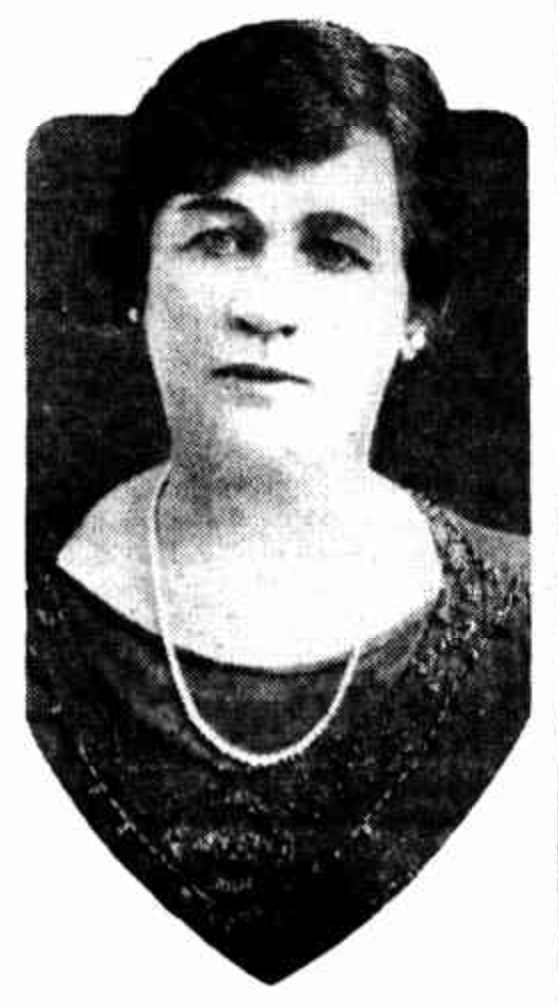
Seery in 1924

Eva Mary Seery (née Dempsey; 27 February 1874 – 22 May 1937) was an Australian political organiser in New South Wales and one of the first women to stand for the Australian Parliament with major party endorsement.

== Personal history ==
Eva Seery was born on 27 February 1874 at Tangmangaroo near Yass, New South Wales to farmer and goldminer Edwin Joseph Dempsey and Mary, née Kelly. Eva and her family moved to Temora and then West Wyalong, where she and her sister Sophia Beatrice "Sophy" (1872–1946) became dressmakers. On 26 November 1898 Sophy married miner John Seery at Wyalong, and on 23 May 1900 Eva married John's brother, East Maitland gaol warder Joseph Michael Seery.

== Political activities ==
By 1889, Eva Dempsey and her sister Sophy had joined the Australian Labor Party (then called the Labour League in New South Wales) in the Grenfell electorate in 1889, the only female members.

Eva and Joseph moved to Sydney in 1903 and Eva joined the Labour League at Waverley before helping to form the Surry Hills league in 1906. A founding member of the Labor Women's Central Organising Committee (LWCOC) (1904), she succeeded Edith Bethel as secretary in 1909 and served until 1922. A campaigner for increased pay for women, she became president of the Domestic Workers Union in 1913. A frequent delegate to Labor conferences from Waverley, she called for child endowment, equal pay and political and social rights for women at the rowdy pre-World War I conferences.

Together with Kate Dwyer and May Matthews, Seery contested Labor Party preselection for the Senate in 1916 but was unsuccessful, ultimately being endorsed instead as the candidate for the safe conservative seat of Robertson; she and Henrietta Greville were the first women endorsed by a major party to contest the Australian Parliament. Seery strenuously opposed conscription and also opposed the socialist objective at the 1919 Labor conference. In 1921 she was one of the first 61 women appointed justices of the peace. The success and survival of the LWCOC is often attributed to Seery and Dwyer's skills. She was president of the Women Justices' Association for five years, retiring in November 1934.

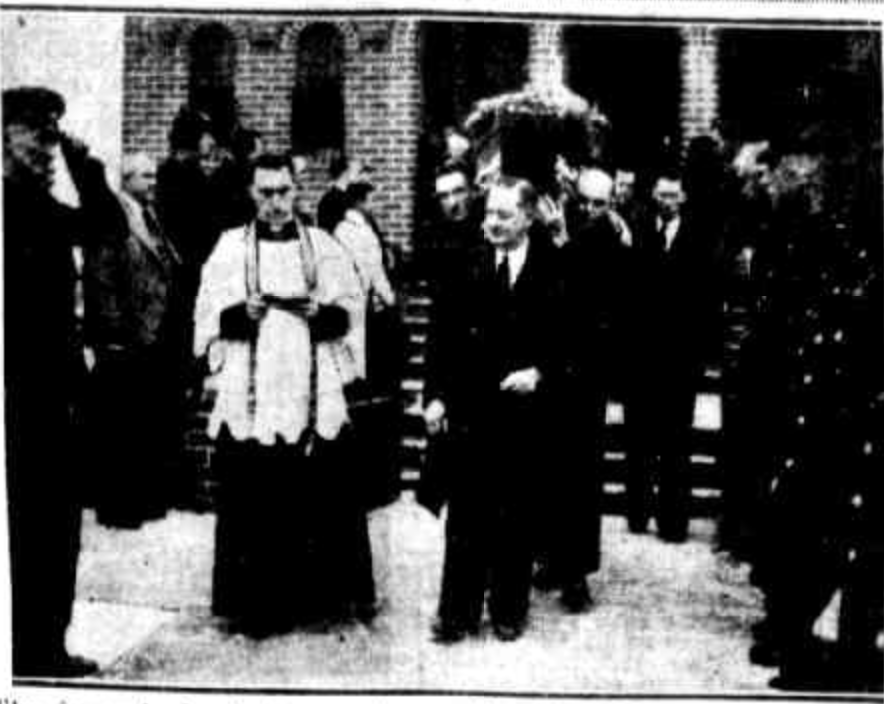
Seery's coffin being carried from St. Andrew's Church, Malabar following her funeral

Seery later supported Bob Heffron's Industrial Labor Party.

== Death ==
She died of diabetes in 1937 at Long Bay gaol, where her husband was superintendent. She was buried in Botany cemetery and was survived by her husband (who later remarried) and three daughters.
