= Henrietta Greville =

Australian labour organiser (1861–1964)

Henrietta Greville Member of the Order of the British Empire
- Born: Henrietta Wyse; 9 October 1861; Dunedin, New Zealand
- Died: 29 August 1964 (aged 102); Lakemba, Sydney, Australia
- Occupations: Labour Organiser, Educator, Executive, Candidate
- Employer: Workers' Educational Association of New South Wales
- Organization(s): Australian Workers' Union; Women Workers' Union; White Workers' Union; Union of Australian Women
- Known for: Labour organizing, running for the Australian Parliament with major party endorsement
- Political party: Political Labour League
- Spouse(s): John Collins (1881-1889); Hector Greville (1894- )
- Children: 3
- Parents: Henry Wyse (father); Rebecca Hutchinson Wyse (mother)

Henrietta Greville MBE (née Wyse; 9 October 1861 – 29 August 1964) was an Australian labour organiser and one of the first women to run for the Australian Parliament with major party endorsement.

== Early life and education ==
Greville was born in Dunedin, New Zealand, to Australian-born gold prospector Henry Wyse and his wife, Rebecca (née Hutchinson) Wyse. The family moved to Victoria in 1866 and to New South Wales in 1868. Despite her lack of formal education Henrietta was briefly a teacher at the age of 17. On 3 August 1881 at Albury Registry Office, she married jeweller John Collins, but the marriage was unhappy and they separated in 1889, Henrietta and her four children returning to her parents' farm at Temora. Collins later died in Western Australia.

== Career ==
Greville worked as a seamstress, but the 1890s depression led her to move to the goldfields at West Wyalong, where she helped to establish a local branch of the Political Labour League. She married miner and union organiser Hector Greville on 30 August 1894, and despite moving frequently to support the family, they reportedly had a happy marriage. Henrietta Greville became an organiser for the Australian Workers' Union serving as president of its women's section on the Wyalong goldfields, and later became influential in the Women Workers' Union, serving as its delegate to the Trades and Labour Council.

In 1902 the family was in Sydney, where Greville became associated with Bertha McNamara's radical group, and in 1908 she became an organiser for the White Workers' Union which covered women doing "white work" (needlework and laundering). An anti-conscription campaigner, she and Eva Seery were the first women endorsed for a federal election by a major political party when they ran for the 1917 federal election as Labor candidates, albeit in safe conservative seats. Greville won Labor preselection for Wentworth ahead of six male contenders. She was the first woman chosen by an ALP league or trade union as a candidate. She addressed an average of three public meetings a night for six weeks before polling nearly 11,000 votes against the sitting member, on an election budget of just £1/12/6, reportedly a record-low spend for a federal campaign. Greville was defeated in Wentworth and subsequently stood for the state seat of Vaucluse in 1927. By 1938 was president of the NSW Labor Women's Advisory Council.

Greville studied economics from 1914 to 1916 and became branch secretary of the Workers' Educational Association of New South Wales at Lithgow in 1918, moving to the executive in 1919 and president (the first female president) in 1920. She remained active for many years, being particularly associated with sex education, and was directing groups aged 94. She was also a long-standing advocate for old-age pensioners, serving as state secretary and later vice-president of an old-age pensioners' association and working on a proposal for aged-care housing in Sydney.

== Personal life and legacy ==
Her husband died in 1938, but Greville remained a public figure, and in 1945 was made a life member of the Union of Australian Women. Around this time, she began to identify more with the Communist Party of Australia, which she supported but did not join.

She was appointed a Member of the Order of the British Empire in January 1958. She died aged 102 at Lakemba, Sydney, in 1964 and was cremated. She was survived by two sons and a daughter of her second marriage.

In February 1963, the Union of Australian Women named its new Sydney headquarters, in Druitt Street, the "Henrietta Greville Rooms" in her honour. She opened the rooms herself shortly before her 102nd birthday. A block of pensioners' units was named in her memory in 1964.
