= Hill End Historic Site =

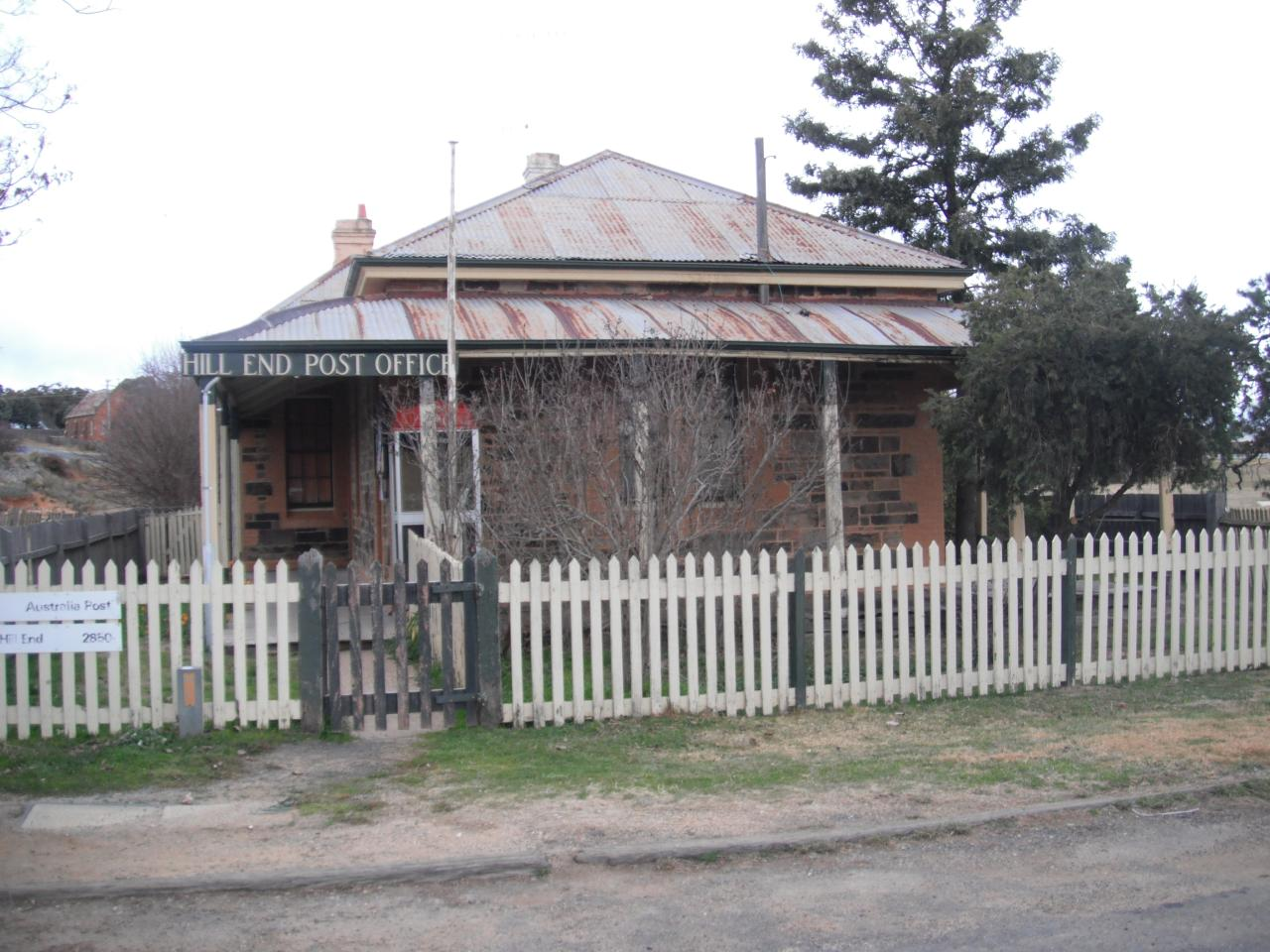

- Location within New South Wales Location within Australia
- 33.0334°S 149.4167°E
- Location: Hill End, Bathurst Region, New South Wales, Australia

History
- Built: 1851–

Site notes
- Architect: Various
- Owner: Office of Environment and Heritage

New South Wales Heritage Register
- Official name: Hill End Historic Site
- Type: state heritage (conservation area)
- Designated: 2 April 1999
- Reference no.: 993
- Type: Townscape
- Category: Urban Area
- Builders: Various

Hill End Historic Site is a heritage-listed township at Hill End, in the Central West region of New South Wales, Australia. Established as a gold rush town, the site was added to the New South Wales State Heritage Register on 2 April 1999.

== History ==
Prior to c. 1820, when the country around Hill End was settled by pastoralists such as Suttor and Cummings who ran sheep and cattle, it was the home of the Wiradjuri people.

Payable gold was discovered in the Tambaroora and Hill End goldfields by mid 1851, following discoveries in the region in previous months. Shortly afterwards the population skyrocketed and, for a while, the area exceeded the Victorian fields in size and prosperity. Early efforts were focused on alluvial gold and the towns of Hill End and Tambaroora grew up around the creeks and dams worked for that purpose. In 1859, with the imposition of an urban plan for Hill End, the town grew in a more orderly fashion and by the height of the second, larger rush in 1872, it was the largest inland settlement in the colony of New South Wales. In the latter part of the century, however, the population dwindled with the exhaustion of the major reefs in the area. Today the population stands at about one hundred and twenty, a stark contrast from the estimated 8,000 during its peak.

The discovery of alluvial gold, readily recoverable from the clay beds of creeks and dams, brought large numbers of individual, inexperienced prospectors to the Tambaroora area. The inexpensive and often simplistic equipment needed to extract the gold was well suited to both the skills and capital such individuals possessed. A good living could be made by the self-employed miner. This ensured an ever-changing stream of immigrants and locals moving in and out of the goldfields from the cities. Few miners remained to settle in the areas where they made their fortune, a tendency indicated by the small percentage of families present on many of the major fields and the sharp falls in population during times of drought or when the gold supply itself began to run out . By the late 1860s reef exploitation had emerged as the most popular and profitable method of mining, acting as the catalyst for the second, larger gold rush of the 1870s, when Hill End reached its peak in size and prosperity.

Public interest in Hill End resumed in the 1940s due largely to the work of several artists including Donald Friend and Russell Drysdale. The discovery in the 1950s of hundreds of photographic plates depicting scenes and buildings in the Hill End in the early 1870s captured by Beaufoy Merlin, further boosted interest along with the extensive Holtermann photographic collection. The town was gazetted as a historic site under the National Parks and Wildlife Act in 1967.

== Description ==
Hill End Historic Site is situated approximately 300 km north-west of Sydney and 80 km north of Bathurst.

The historic site consists of approximately 130ha of land within the village of Hill End, including two outlying areas of land: Valentine's Mine and the Roasting Pits.

Hill End Historic Site [3902007] contains the following elements: English Group, Bennett House, District Hospital, Jeffree/Warry House, Craigmoor, Murray House, CWA House, Royal Hall, Royal Hotel, General Store, General Store Sheds, Piesley House, Bakehouse, Rose Cottage, Rectory buildings, Heap/Adler House, Woolard House, Krohmann-Ackerman Cottage, Northey's Store, Lyle House, Risby House, Hosie's House, Telegram Office, Hocking House, Holtermann's House, Beyer House, Mobb House, Great Western Store, Fry's Hut, Bryant's Butchery, Assay Office, Haefliger House, Post Office, Bleak House, Fairfax House, Denman House, Denman House shed, Catholic Church, the Manse, Carver House, Bald Hill Mine, Pullen's Battery, Chappell's Battery, Quartz Roasting Pits and Valentine's Mine.

The Valentine Mine comprises a series of shafts, a large tailings dump, trolley way, boiler block, battery house, ten head battery, explosives shed, battery sand flow, cyanide tanks, water tank stand, blacksmiths shop, managers residence, horse paddock and large dam. There are also building mounds and a rubbish dump.

The Quartz Roasting Pits are located approximately 10 km north of Hill End and comprises a pair of inverted bell shaped kilns, a battery building, a dam and the remains of two houses. It represents one of the oldest surviving gold extraction sites surviving in Australia.

Many of the structures retain their original fabric and are in good condition. The archaeological resource is excellent.

== Heritage listing ==
Hill End is a place of national cultural significance due to its aesthetic, historic, scientific and social value to past, present and future generations of Australians. From the period of its settlement and principal development in the 1870s, Hill End retains a unique collection of buildings, relics, artifacts, structures, archaeological sites and landscape elements which are, individually and collectively, of outstanding architectural, aesthetic and research value. The village is set along a gold bearing quartz seam within a tablelands landscape of rolling hills, accentuating the feelings of peaceful isolation. From the hectic goldrush era and subsequent years of decline, to the period of NPWS intervention, the village, buildings, vacant sites and gardens continue to reflect the social and economic forces which continue its survival

Hill End historic site was listed on the New South Wales State Heritage Register on 2 April 1999 having satisfied the following criteria.

The place is important in demonstrating the course, or pattern, of cultural or natural history in New South Wales.

Hill End is of outstanding historical value. It retains significant physical evidence of its history in its groups of early timber, earth and brick buildings within settings of remnant garden and orchard plantings. Surrounding the village core is a historic landscape full of the evidence of mining activity. The fabric of the village has been relatively undisturbed since the turn of the century. The township and surrounding goldfields were the site of the first reef mining in Australia.

The place is important in demonstrating aesthetic characteristics and/or a high degree of creative or technical achievement in New South Wales.

Hill End's elevated setting above the Turon Valley, combined with its ensemble of 19th century buildings and ruins, presents an environment of contained, peaceful isolation. Many landforms and features remain the same as they were when the gold rushes ceased and are all evocative of the frenzied activity and excitement of the rush period. Remnants of the gardens, orchards, and street plantings have survived and matured to picturesquely complement the remaining structures of the village. This combination of picket fences, ruins, surviving buildings etc., has been of continuing inspiration to many noted Australian artists. Many of the buildings contain original interior finishes, furnishings and artefacts which are of outstanding importance and together comprise a collection with few rivals. Other structures are of interest for the way in which they show the evolution in building conservation practice and philosophy in New South Wales.

The place has a strong or special association with a particular community or cultural group in New South Wales for social, cultural or spiritual reasons.

Hill End is a dynamic, living entity. The history of the village and its current interpretation and management are of particular significance to the present Hill End community, many of whom proudly trace their ancestry to the original miners and villagers.

As social documents, the buildings, individually and collectively, reveal the life of the town. The often original interiors, artefacts and gardens suggest the daily life and aspirations of their inhabitants.

The place has potential to yield information that will contribute to an understanding of the cultural or natural history of New South Wales.

Hill End is a site of extraordinary scientific value to research in such fields as historical archaeology, architectural history, landscape history, social and engineering history. Virtually every site from Tambaroora in the north to Hawkins Hill in the south can yield valuable scientific information, in particular the evolution of mining techniques and building styles. The site provides a remarkable recreational, interpretative and educational resource for present and future generations.

The place possesses uncommon, rare or endangered aspects of the cultural or natural history of New South Wales.

Hill End Historic Site is extremely rare in its historic, technical and aesthetic significance.
