= Edith Bethel =

Australian political organizer (1871–1929)

- Born: Edith Clarke; 1 March 1871; Bowen, Queensland, Australia
- Died: 21 December 1929 (aged 58); Mosman, New South Wales, Australia

Edith Bethel born Edith Clarke (1 March 1871 – 21 December 1929) was an Australian political organizer.

== Life ==
Bethel was born in Bowen, Queensland. In 1882 Walter Edmund Bethel who was about eight years older and married began a relationship with her and in 1884 when she was about thirteen years old she gave birth to a child who was adopted. Edith was the daughter of Mary Sophia born Edkins and her husband William Clarke. Her mother was born in England and her father was born in Ireland. Her father became the mayor.

As a student she showed her talents in music, English and French. She was an active member of Pitt Street Uniting Church's congregation and she visited the church's mission in Sussex Street in Sydney.

Walter Bethel the father of her child divorced his wife, Eva Louisa Brierly, in 1895 and married her. Walter and Eva had three children. The month after Walter's divorce he married Edith. Walter was a civil servant and he would also write for the Sun newspaper.

Edith Bethel took an interest in the Australian Labor Party and she came to notice when she became the founding secretary of the Women's Central Organising Committee (WCOC) in September 1904. The WCOC was part of New South Wales' Political Labor League and she attended their next annual conference in February 1905. She was among the first woman allowed into a Labor Party conference and she was one of six women elected to the New South Wales Labor Party's executive in January 1906. The other five were Kate Dwyer, Harriet Powell, the 1903 parliamentary candidate Selina Siggins, the American born A. E. Gardiner, Mary Anne Grant, and Maggie Hall.

Bethel was elected to lead a women's branch of the party in North Sydney and she was re-elected to the executive of the party from 1906 to 1908. She held the role of WCOC secretary until 1909 when she was replaced by Eva Seery who had also been one of the few founding members of the WCOC.

Bethel was expelled from the Labor Party in the row about conscription.

She and Walter divorced in 1919. Bethel died in Mosman in 1929.
