= Pitt Street Uniting Church =

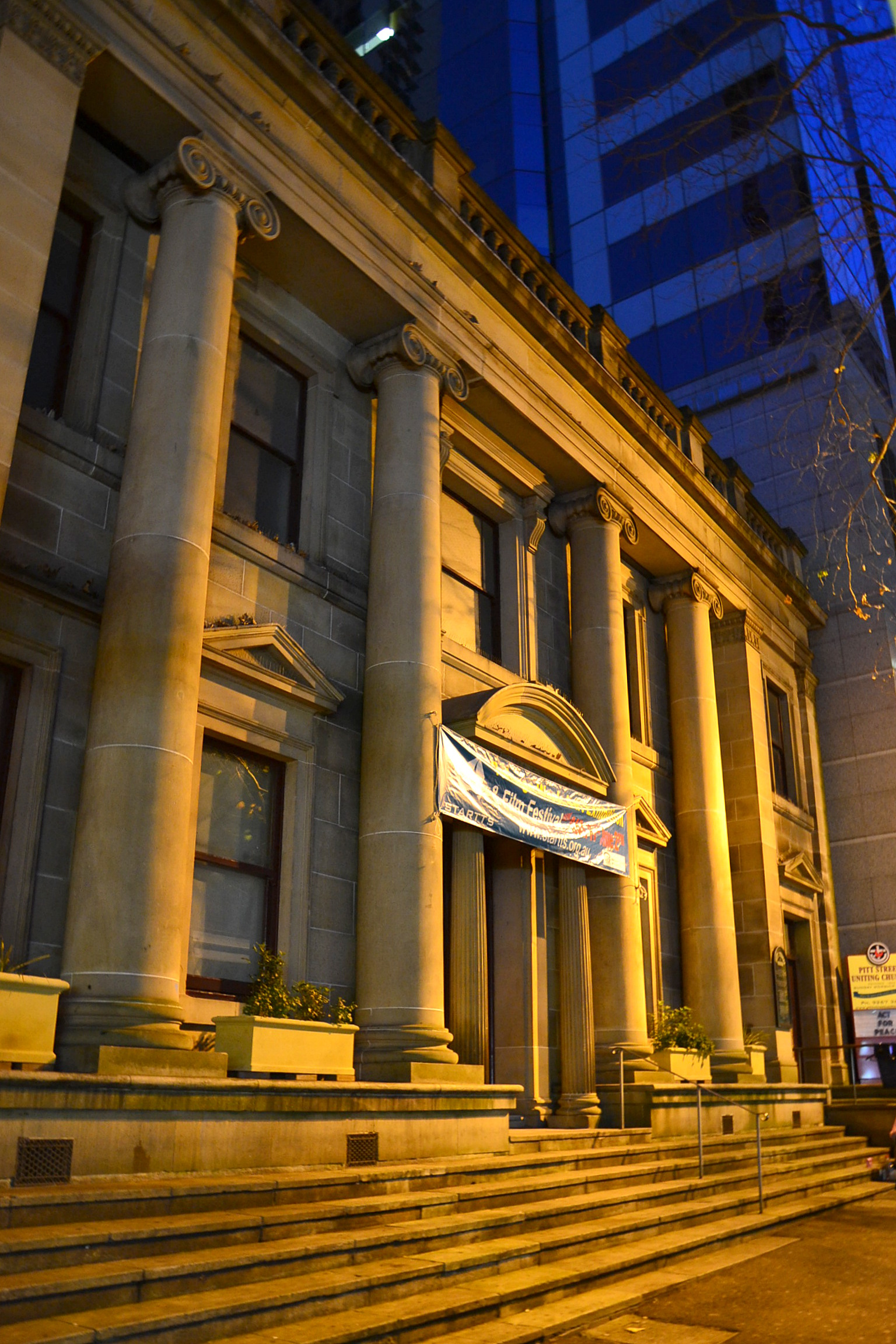
- Pitt Street Uniting Church in 2012

- Location within Sydney
- 33°52′25″S 151°12′30″E
- Location: 264 Pitt Street, Sydney, New South Wales
- Country: Australia
- Denomination: Uniting Church in Australia
- Previous denomination: Congregationalism
- Website: pittstreetuniting.org.au

History
- Former name: Pitt Street Congregational Church
- Status: Church
- Founded: 1842

Architecture
- Functional status: Active
- Architects: John Bibb; George Allen Mansfield
- Architectural type: Church
- Style: Old Colonial Georgian Classical
- Years built: 1841–1846

Specifications
- Materials: Sydney sandstone; Brick; Cast iron railed stairs; Cedar timber panelling

New South Wales Heritage Register
- Official name: Pitt Street Uniting Church; Pitt Street Congregational Church
- Type: State heritage (built)
- Designated: 2 April 1999
- Reference no.: 22
- Type: Church
- Category: Religion

The Pitt Street Uniting Church is a heritage-listed Uniting church building located at 264 Pitt Street in the Sydney central business district, Australia. Founded in 1833, the congregation was the original church of Congregationalism in New South Wales. The church building was designed by John Bibb and built from 1841 to 1846. It is also known as Pitt Street Congregational Church. The property is owned by the Uniting Church in Australia.

== History ==
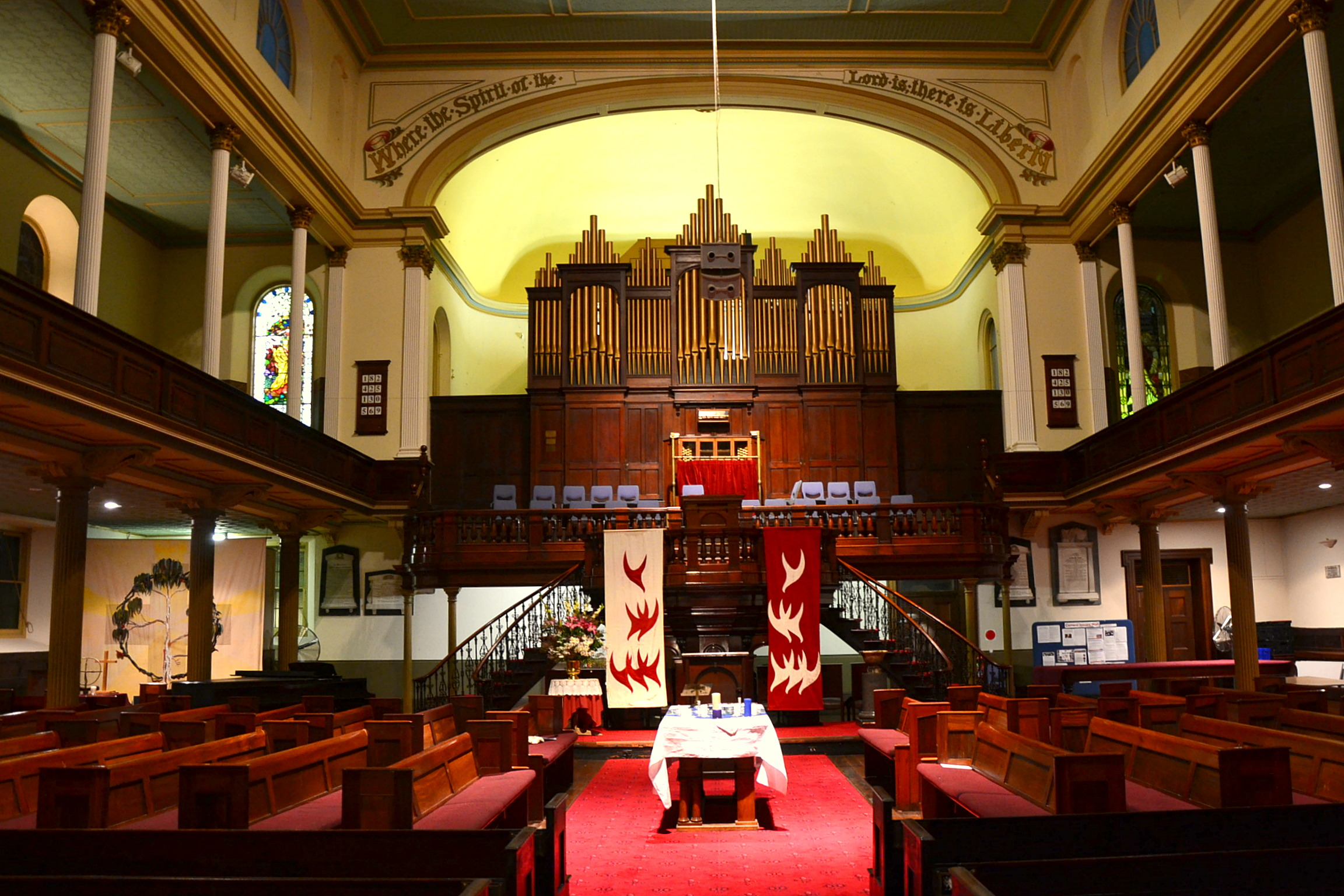

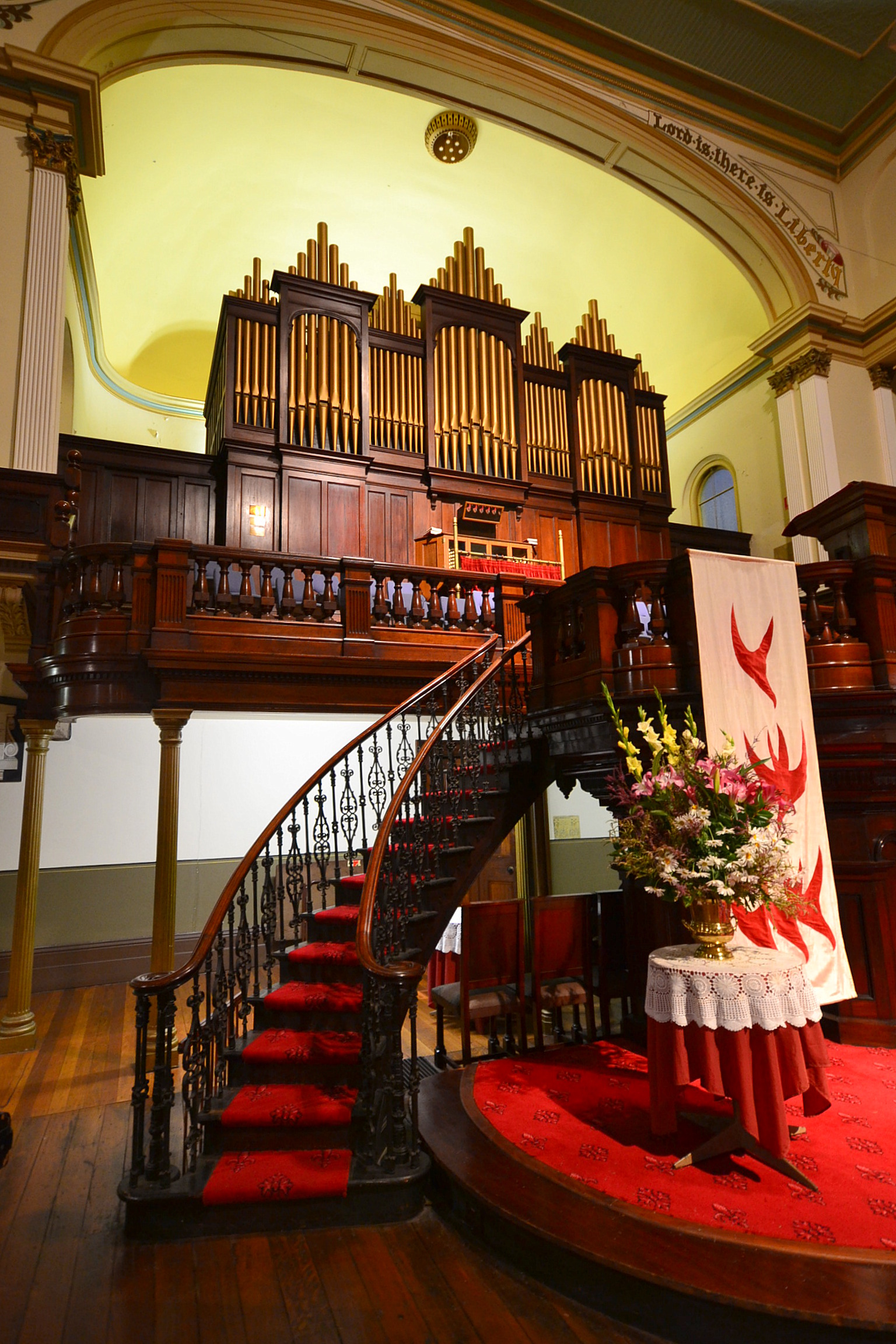
This image and image above: church interior

The life of the congregation began when a church was founded on a nearby site in 1833. The foundation stone for the current building was laid in 1842 and took 4 years to complete. In 1846, the congregation moved to the new building, which was expanded in size and design in 1867. The original church was designed by John Bibb and built on the southern half of the present site between 1841 and 1846. Prior to its construction, the Congregationalists of colonial Sydney met in a building called the Independent Chapel, located on the western side of Pitt Street between Market and Park streets. This was opened as a place of public worship in 1833, but the rapidly growing congregation soon necessitated the erection of a larger building. The foundation stone was laid in 1841, but economic recession meant it wasn't completed until 1846.

The Church took its present form in 1867 after extensive remodelling by architect George Allen Mansfield. This included the extension of the sandstone facade and the enlargement of the original iron pallisade fence as well as significant changes to the interior.

The church was involved in debates on a number of social issues, especially education. It supported initiatives such as the establishment of the Sussex Street Mission, the Boys' Brigade and the YMCA.

In 1928, Church House (now Pilgrim House) was erected, as an early attempt to introduce an income earning space to support pastoral activities. Pilgrim House was constructed during a revival in the activities of the parish under the ministry of the Rev. T. E. Ruth, previously of the Collins Street Baptist Church, Melbourne. He promoted the idea that the parish should expand its role and its ability to earn income by the provision of both meeting rooms and rentable space.

In the 1960s there was a proposal to demolish the building. Jack Mundey and the Builders Labourers Federation responded to a plea by congregation members and declared a green ban on the project, thus saving the building. By the mid-1970s, the small congregation, devoted itself to renewing the life of the parish and began restoring the church and Pilgrim House.

In 1977 it became part of the Uniting Church.

There have been several attempts to demolish the building. Restoration work was carried out in the early 1980s with a grant from the Heritage Council of New South Wales and again in 1989 and 1996.

== Architecture ==
The exterior is an example of late Old Colonial Georgian Classical design. The facade to Pitt Street is sandstone, symmetrical with monumental Ionic columns rising through a two-storey, supporting cornice and balustraded parapet. Columns flank pedimented windows on ground floor and central door, with windows lighting the galleries above. Access to the building is via a shallow flight of stairs and narrow podium. The remaining walls are of brick. Galleries supported on cast iron fluted columns, run around the interior walls. The central pulpit and platform are approached by twin cast iron railed stairs. All the fittings are of local cedar.

The building was designed by English-trained John Bibb (1810–1862) who in 1832 joined John Verge, one of the leading architects in Sydney, as an assistant. It was enlarged between 1857 and 1867, by the architect GA Mansfield. This included the internal galleries, resting on fluted iron columns cast by Dawson of Sydney, and the vestry to the rear.

During the 1960s the church fell into disrepair, but the loss of the building altogether was prevented by a ban imposed by the Builders Labourers Federation in 1973. Some basic work to bring the organ back into use was carried out in 1974 by Pitchford & Garside: in 1982 the firm commenced a staged restoration project with Kelvin Hastie as consultant and this was assisted by a NSW Heritage Grant.

=== Modifications and dates ===
- 1867 – new central pulpit and platform installed

== Historical figures ==
Many prominent citizens of Sydney were associated with the church and the walls are covered with memorial plaques that give a commentary on the life of the church itself. Notable members of the congregation have included David Jones, John Fairfax, Rev. John West, Rev. Joseph Coles Kirby and Edith Bethel.

In 1951, Hilda May Abba was ordained at the church, the first woman ordained as a theological lecturer in Australia. Rev. Dr Dorothy McRae-McMahon was minister there 1983–1993, during which time she and the congregation were strong supporters of Sydney's anti-Apartheid movement.

== Heritage listing ==
The Pitt Street Uniting Church has had a significant role in the development of the social and religious life of Australia. It has always represented a pioneering and socially aware face to the community. It architectural design is significant as an example of Neo Classicism in Australia. It is a fine example of notable architect John Bibb's work. It was the first Independent Church in Australia. It has associations with notable local figures, including David Jones and James Fairfax.

Pitt Street Uniting Church was listed on the New South Wales State Heritage Register on 2 April 1999 having satisfied the following criteria.

The place is important in demonstrating the course, or pattern, of cultural or natural history in New South Wales.

The Church was originally designed by John Bibb, who is well known for his association with the design of Elizabeth Bay House, Camden House, the Sydney Infirmary, The Mariner's Church for Seamen and St James' Grammar School.

Memorials to notable figures including David Jones and James Fairfax can be found within the Church.

The Pitt Street Church is known as the Mother Church of Congregationalism in mainland Australia. It was the first Independent Church in Australia. The Church was strongly involved in local issues and supported the social and liberal traditions of the nineteenth century. It was responsible for setting up one of the first city missions.

The place is important in demonstrating aesthetic characteristics and/or a high degree of creative or technical achievement in New South Wales.

The Neo Classic design is a kind in Australia.

The organ within the church is the most substantial and significant organ from the Edwardian decade, surviving in New South Wales. Apart from the Sydney Town Hall Grand Organ, this is the only Hill and Son organ with tubular-pneumatic action surviving in Australia. Alexander Rea was an early organist (1864–1869).
