= Quartz Roasting Pits Complex =

Quartz roasting kiln

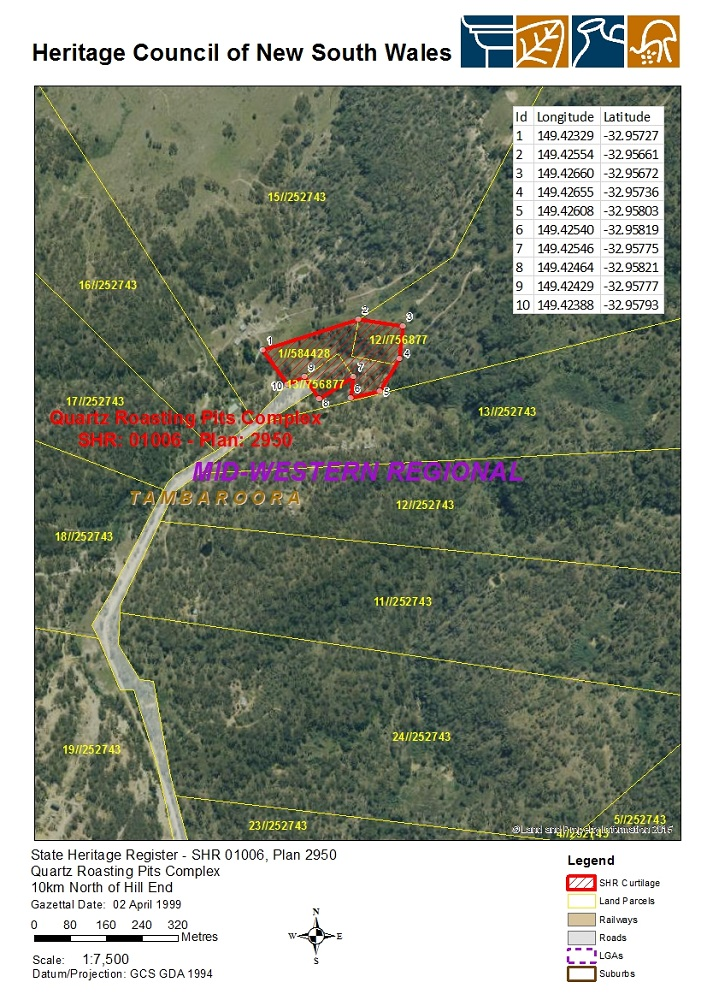
- Heritage boundaries

- Location within New South Wales Location within Australia
- 32.9573°S 149.4252°E
- Location: 10km north of Hill End, Mid-Western Regional Council, New South Wales, Australia

History
- Built: 1854–1855

Site notes
- Owner: Office of Environment and Heritage

New South Wales Heritage Register
- Official name: Quartz Roasting Pits Complex; Cornish Roasting Pits
- Type: state heritage (archaeological-terrestrial)
- Designated: 2 April 1999
- Reference no.: 1006
- Type: Quartz roasting kiln
- Category: Mining and Mineral Processing

Quartz Roasting Pits Complex is a heritage-listed quartz roasting kiln located 10 km north of Hill End, Mid-Western Regional Council, New South Wales, Australia. It was built from 1854 to 1855. It is also known as Cornish Roasting Pits. The property is owned by the New South Wales Office of Environment and Heritage. It was added to the New South Wales State Heritage Register on 2 April 1999.

== History ==
The Hill End Quartz Roasting Pits Complex was established by the Colonial Gold Mining Company in 1855, on the traditional land of the Wiradjuri people, to provide gold extraction facilities for those working claims on the Tambaroora and Hill End goldfields. Although at this time alluvial mining was the primary method of gold recovery, the Tambaroora fields also supported the earliest attempts at reef mining in Australia, over fifteen years before the reef mining boom of the 1870s. The Quartz Roasting Pits Complex is one of the oldest goldrush sites in Australia and represents one of the first attempts to process gold bearing ore. It also represents an unusual technological solution to the problems initially experienced in extracting payable gold from the quartz reefs, in its development of the earliest form of quartz firing technology in Australia. With kilns for roasting gold bearing quartz, a sophisticated battery and dam system for crushing and washing the ore and houses for workers, the Complex provides tangible evidence of technological, social and domestic relationships during this very early stage of Australia's goldmining history. Gold bearing quartz was brought to the Complex from surrounding mines and roasted to make it easier to crush (a relatively unusual process) and then crushed in a steam powered battery. Gold was then extracted from the powdered ore through a process of sieving and washing.

Despite its impressive technological achievements, the operation, managed and probably designed by Alfred Spence, was short-lived, closing in 1856, only eighteen months after it opened. This may have been partly due to the fact that the primitive roasting techniques employed hampered the gold extraction process. It may also have been due to the lack of gold in the reefs of the surrounding area, which were not fully tested before the Complex was established.

Since 1856, no major development has occurred on the site with the land being used for grazing, as part of Alpha Station. Ownership was transferred to National Parks and Wildlife in 1967. Limited archaeological excavations were undertaken by the University of Sydney in 1975 and partial reconstruction of the battery and roasting pits in 1977.

Following the reassessment of the site in April 1997, the site is being stabilised and new interpretative signage prepared for its presentation to the public.

== Description ==
The Roasting Pits Complex is located approximately 10 km north of Hill End township and approximately 2.5 km north of Valentine's Mine which acted as the main source of auriferous quartz. It sits within a small gently sloping valley, straddling a shallow watercourse. The site comprises a pair of kilns, a battery building which housed ore crushing machinery, a dam and the remains of two houses where the manager and various workers lived while the site was in operation. The Battery and Roasting Pits form the visual focus of the site, as they would have in the 1850s. From this point, all the other structures with the exception of the Dam, are largely obscured by vegetation. When the site was in operation however, the landscape would have been barren, with a clear view of mining activities in the surrounding hills. This harsh cultural landscape is still evident on close examination although its general sense has been diminished somewhat by the later plant growth.

It is likely, given the short history of the Complex's operation, that all of the substantial structures on the site were built at about the same time in c. 1855. They would have suffered some impact upon the closure of the operation as equipment was salvaged, scavenged and removed from the site. Apart from grazing and cultivation, no significant later use of the site is known.

The Roasting Pits are a two chamber kiln structure set on the hill upslope of the Battery. The Pits are composed of hard sedimentary stone, predominantly metamorphosed shale and greywacke. The kiln contains two conical pits that open from the top and taper sharply to ground level at the front (downslope). Each pit is built in front of an artificial embankment that joins the hill contour but drops sharply on both sides.

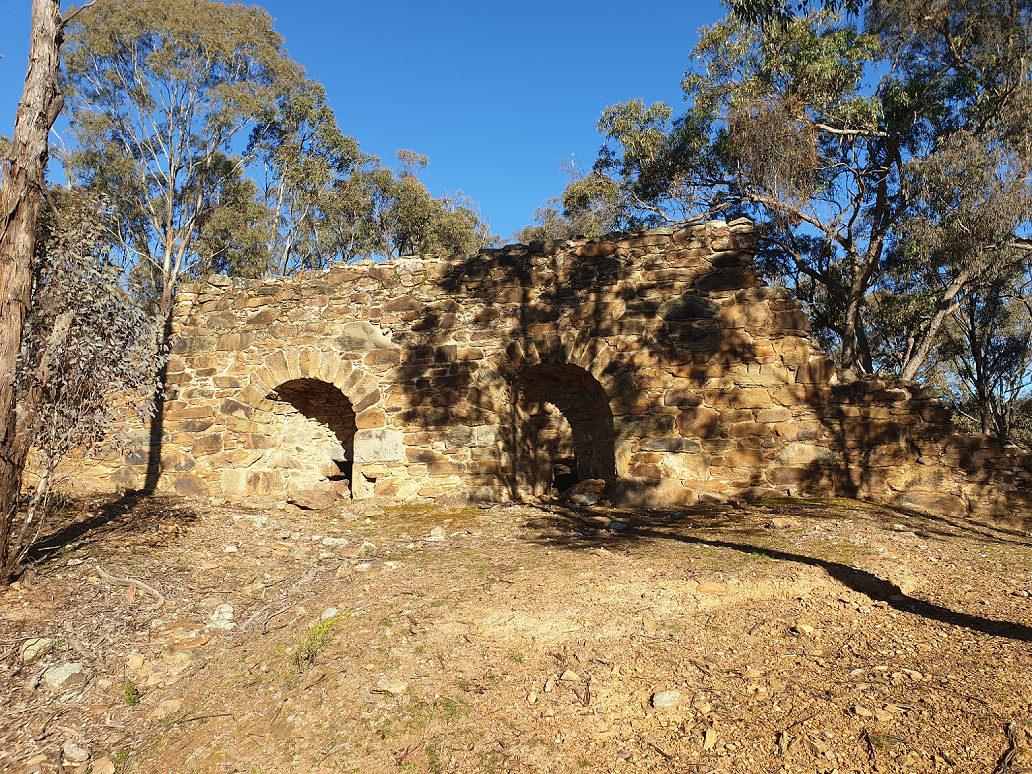
Roasting pits

The Battery sits on the valley floor about 20m below the Roasting Pits. It was here that the ore was crushed after roasting. The placement of the Battery on Fighting Ground Creek provided an area for tailings run off and access to a ready supply of water which was fed from the Dam further upstream. Locating it directly below the Roasting Pits also assisted the movement of the roasted ore from one stage of the extraction process to the next. The Battery is a large structure containing two main spaces and a solid stone platform containing several voids or spaces for machinery. It is oriented approximately north-south along its long axis, roughly parallel to the creek bank and across the slope leading down from the Roasting Pits. The western side of the building is cut into the slope, while the eastern is built onto the flat creek terrace.

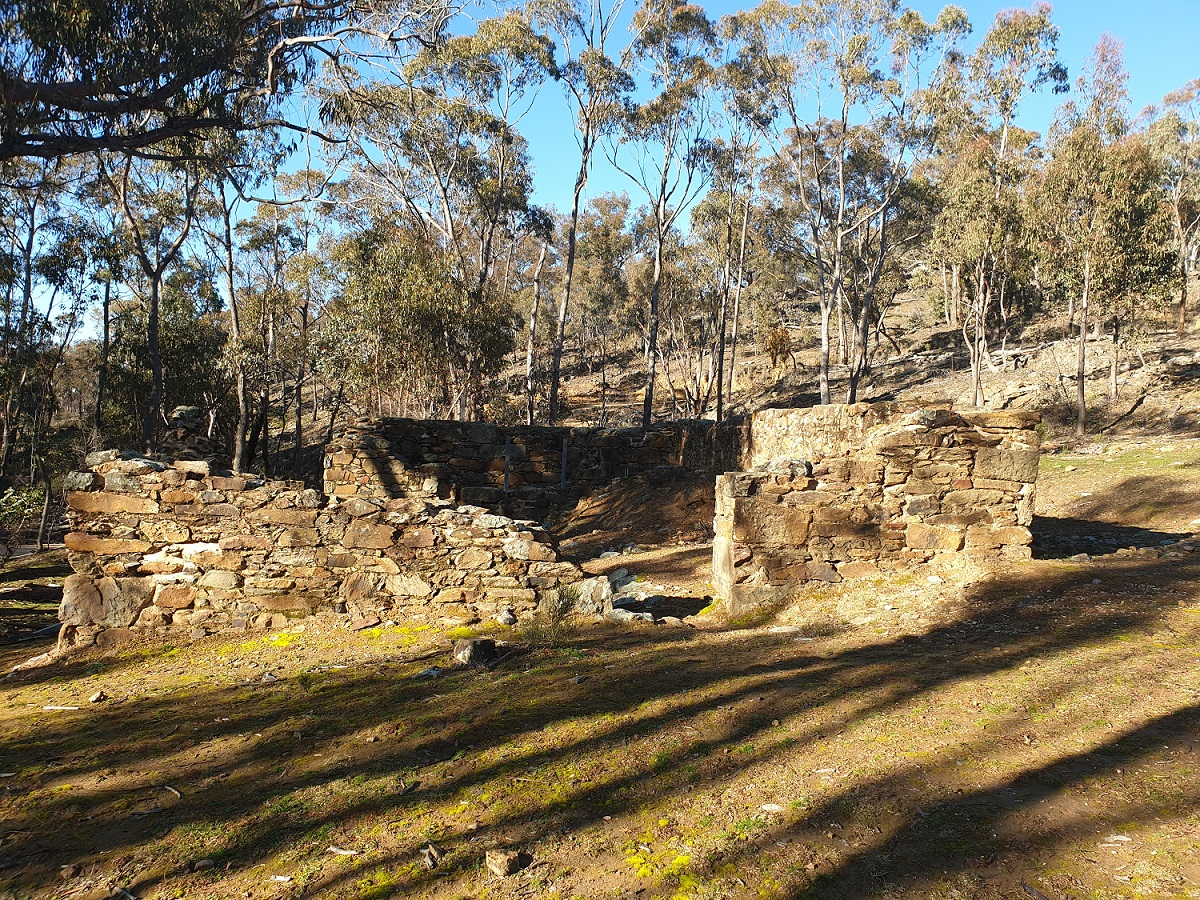
Battery plant ruins

Other features are scattered throughout the surrounding bush including house remains and a large earth dam to the north-east of the battery.

The site was reported to have high archaeological potential as at 29 August 1997.

The ruins retain their integrity.

== Heritage listing ==
The Hill End Quartz Roasting Pits is nationally significant as one of the earliest surviving reasonably intact gold mining related sites in Australia. The site demonstrates the operations of an uncommon technology brought to Australia to deal with the intractable quartz being mined. As an industrial site all facets of the processes that took place and the infrastructure associated with it are still represented. The site provides an understanding of the nature of capital investment, technological transfer and mining and extractive processes at the very start of the gold boom, which was itself a process of lasting importance for Australia.

The Roasting Pits are nationally significant as a rare example of the application of a common design for lime burning being adapted for the roasting of quartz. They reflect the period prior to the development of specialised quartz roasting kilns.

The Battery is nationally significant as a purpose-built structure to house a boiler, beam engine and stamper battery. It represents the oldest surviving stamper battery building erected for gold mining in Australia, being substantially intact and interpretable as a working structure.

The features associated with the Roasting Pits, such as the Dam, and worker housing are also nationally significant by enhancing the understanding of the infrastructure associated with the operation of the Roasting Pits.

The remains of the fences associated with the 1871 occupation of the site are regionally significant.

Quartz Roasting Pits Complex was listed on the New South Wales State Heritage Register on 2 April 1999 having satisfied the following criteria.

The place is important in demonstrating the course, or pattern, of cultural or natural history in New South Wales.

The Hill End Quartz Roasting Pits are of national historical importance for their role in demonstrating the initial stage of the gold rushes that transformed the nineteenth century Australian economy. They represent an investment of capital and a transfer and application of technology from overseas that is both representative of the processes of the early gold rush period and unusual for its particular form of application. They are an evocative and extremely early representation of the capital-driven reef mining activity that was not to develop a major presence in Hill End until the early 1870s. The nature and pattern of technological transfer and experimentation during the early gold rush period can be understood by historical analysis of the site.

The place is important in demonstrating aesthetic characteristics and/or a high degree of creative or technical achievement in New South Wales.

The setting for the Roasting Pits is aesthetically pleasing as a pastoral landscape, typical of the mix of small farms, cleared pastoral land and variously aged forest regrowth.

The appearance of the Battery, the Roasting Pits and the other cultural features within the complex is evocative of the romance of the historical period of gold mining. It does not reflect the reality, but there is a subliminal juxtaposition of the passivity of the natural setting and the implied violence and chaos of the industrial processes.

The Roasting Pits and the Battery were carefully designed functional structures. It is evident that both were built to prepared designs, and that they were meant to operate closely together as a single functional unit. The design of the Roasting Pits reflects the utilisation, with minimal adaptation, of a standard design for lime kilns. This design, as shown by numerous examples, was commonplace and well-understood. It is rare as an example of the design used for quartz roasting. This type of design was superseded within a decade by more sophisticated designs, such as Wilkinson's in Victoria.

The Battery, as a free-standing industrial building housing a stamper battery, would have been one of the first of its type in Australia. It was also a variation on a type that had a lengthy history in British usage, especially in mining areas such as Cornwall. It was an integration of architectural design and engineering function to create an optimal structure for a specific purpose. As stampers became more common they were housed in expedient structures which lacked the care for masonry construction evident in the Battery.

The place has strong or special association with a particular community or cultural group in New South Wales for social, cultural or spiritual reasons.

The Quartz Roasting Pits Complex represent an early stage of the development of the association that Hill End and Tambaroora had with gold. The link has been strengthened through the management of Hill End by NPWS since 1967 as an exemplar of nineteenth century gold mining landscapes and townscapes and has significance to the current local community. The living history of the area still plays a vital role in day-to-day life. The Complex's social significance is no greater than the remainder of the recognised historic heritage around Hill End.

The place has potential to yield information that will contribute to an understanding of the cultural or natural history of New South Wales.

The technological significance of the Quartz Roasting Pits rests on the rarity of their technology. The use of roasting, while not unknown in Australia, was rare. It reflects the first decade of gold mining in Australia, where lack of knowledge of the material was matched with a poverty of suitable equipment. The technological interest in the site is also enhanced by its integrity. The main features of the entire industrial complex are present in forms that can be interpreted and understood in relation to one another.

It is representative of technology transfer - both as human systems (the Cornish bringing technology and designs into the colony for mining) and as machines (English capital, English and colonial kiln designs, American stampers and gold extracting technology).

There are gaps in our knowledge of the layout and design of the complex, its corporate history, the details of its operation and its success which are able to be investigated by archaeology and no other source.

The rarity of this type of site in intactness from the first phase of goldmining, and of that type of technology guarantees that it will not be represented effectively on many sites at all in Australia.

Many sites of the first decade of the gold rushes have been destroyed by reinvestigation or different mining techniques. Sites of this period are inherently rare due to their vulnerability.

The Quartz Roasting Pits complex can shed more light through archaeological investigation on itself, upon the processes of technological transfer and adaptation of technology in the period of gold mining commencing in Australia.

As a largely intact site it has the potential to reveal the social relationships between different levels in the mining hierarchy, and the interrelationships between human and technological systems. An inquiry could investigate the investment capital used to create the complex and how this was reflected in the material culture of those who worked there. This can be contrasted to those of others who worked for themselves on the gold fields.

The place possesses uncommon, rare or endangered aspects of the cultural or natural history of New South Wales.

The Quartz Roasting Pits Complex is extremely rare in its technical/research and historic significance
