= Louisa Alice Brown =

- Born: 22 July 1875; Adelaide, South Australia
- Died: 21 June 1959 (aged 83); Waverley, New South Wales, Australia
- Known for: Factory and school inspector

Louisa Alice Brown (22 July 1875 – 21 June 1959) was an Australian factory inspector.

== Life ==
Brown was born in 1875 in Adelaide. Her parents were Catherine (born Toohill) and Henry Thomas Brown, a carpenter.

In 1915, she lived with her sister in Sydney for a year. She was employed there as an inspector by the New South Wales Ministry of Labour and Industry.

She was active in several organisations and she was the secretary of the New South Wales branch of the National Council of Women of Australia in 1923. The Early Closing Acts were imposed on shops in her state and she was required to bring prosecutions over those who were breaking the law. She also enforced the Shop and Factories Act that prevented the employment of children under the age of ten. The rules imposed a maximum number of working hours per week (60) and regular holidays were enforced. Girls under fourteen were not allowed to work, but Brown was required to use her discretion. During the depression, she found families in such a poor state that she would arrange help or, in some cases, allow the girl to work because it was the lesser evil.

Belle Golding, who had been the first female inspector of public schools in Australia, retired due to ill health in 1926 and she was succeeded by Brown in 1930. Golding's biographer speculates that Brown was briefed by Golding as they had previously worked together.

She retired in 1940, but she returned to work during the war at the Department of Labour and Industry until 1946. Brown died in 1959 in the Sydney suburb of Waverley.
