= Womanhood Suffrage League of New South Wales =

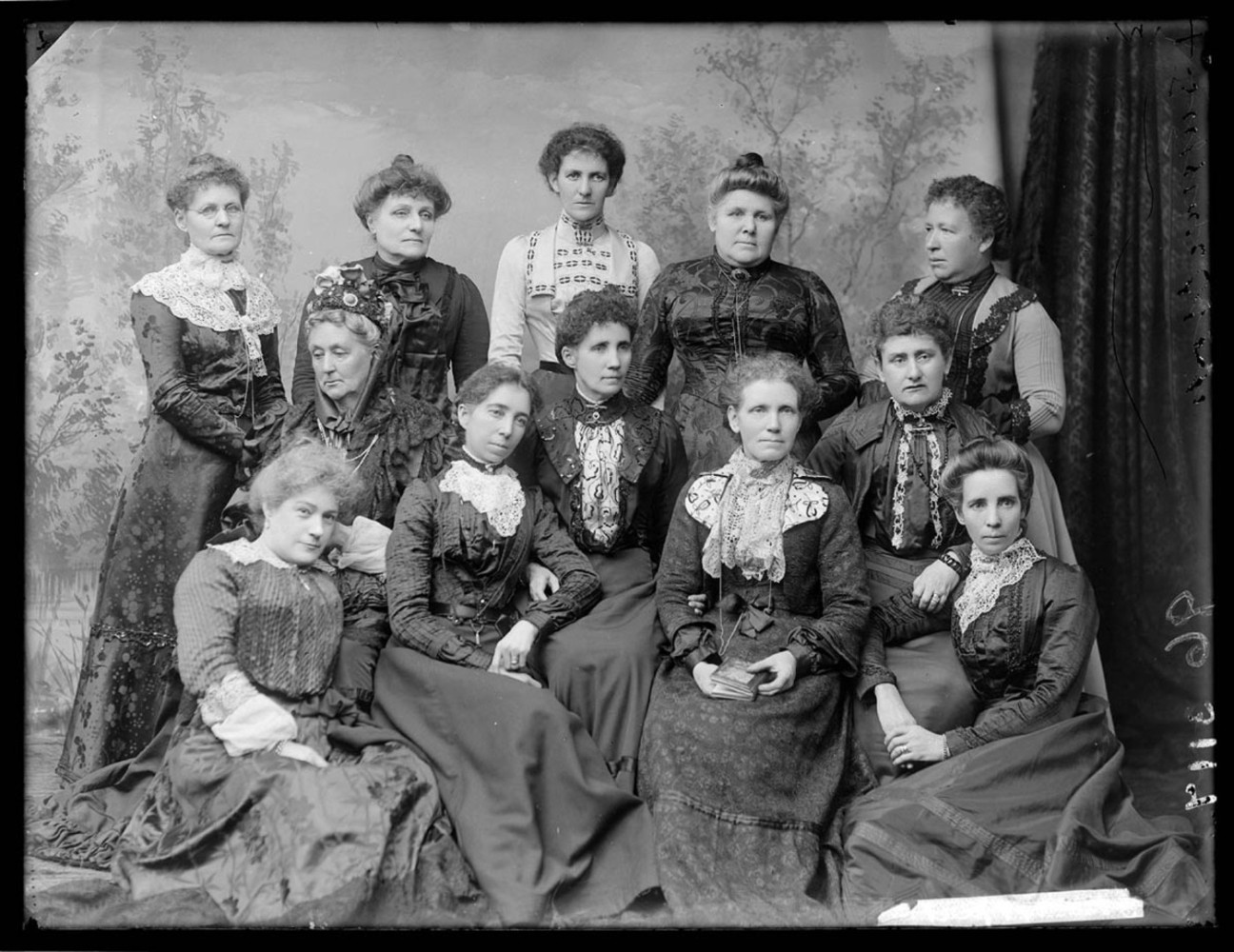
Womanhood Suffrage League of New South Wales, 1902, back row, standing (L to R) Mrs Jackson (President of the Redfern Branch), Mrs Wynn (President of the Annandale Branch), Miss Caldwell (Camperdown), Mrs T. Parkes (President of the Toxteth League), Mrs Hansen (President of the Newtown Branch). Middle row, seated, Mrs McDonald (President of the Glebe Branch), Miss Annie Golding (Organising Secretary of the United Branches), Mrs Chapman (Secretary of the Redfern Branch), front row, seated, Mrs C. Martel (Recording Secretary of the Central League), Miss Belle Golding (Secretary of the Newtown Branch), Mrs Dickie (ex-President of the Newtown League), Mrs Dwyer (Secretary of the Camperdown Branch), from Further Freeman Studio, Sydney, photographic portraits, State Library of New South Wales, ON 219 (96)

The Womanhood Suffrage League of New South Wales was founded in 1891 and campaigned for women's right to vote in New South Wales. Women's suffrage is the right for women to vote in elections.

== Origins ==
Mary Windeyer and Rose Scott, among others, formed the Womanhood Suffrage League of New South Wales from the New South Wales Women's Literary Society and the group held its first meeting on 4 June 1891. The first chair for the meeting was Dr. Vandaleur Kelly and Mary Windeyer was elected the foundation President of the League, while Rose Scott held the position of Secretary.

They held their bi-monthly meetings at the offices of The Dawn and Mary Windeyer resigned from her role in March 1893, when she left Australia and travelled to Chicago, she was replaced by Mrs Louis Haigh. Many men and women from different political parties joined the League whose main purpose was to secure the vote for women upon the same conditions as those which applied to men. In May 1893 Dr Grace Robinson, Bachelor of Medicine and Master of Surgery and one of the first two women graduates at the University of Sydney, joined the League.

On 14 October 1892, prior to the introduction of the Electoral Bill by the NSW Ministry, a deputation from the League which included Lady Windeyer and Mrs Lawson was received by Sir George Dibbs, who promised to bring their request before the Cabinet. On 19 September 1893 the governor of New Zealand signed a new Electoral Act into law which made it the first self-governing country in the world in which women had the right to vote in parliamentary elections. These events pushed forward the case being made by the League and in the same month it was noted that Women's Suffrage had been adopted as a plank in the platform of The Labour Electoral League and that the question had entered the sphere of practical politics in New South Wales. The League also supported the universal voting rights advocated by the utopian socialist settlement New Australia which was set up in Paraguay in 1893. Women were finally granted the right to vote in New South Wales in 1902.

In 1902 the New South Wales Womanhood Suffrage League redefined itself as the Women's Political Educational League.

== Key members ==
- Maybanke Anderson (1845–1927)
- Kate Dwyer (1861–1949)
- Annie Mackenzie Golding (1855–1934)
- Belle Golding (1864–1940)
- Margaret Emily Hodge (1858–1938)
- Louisa Lawson (1848–1920)
- Louisa Macdonald (1858–1949)
- Matilda Emilie Bertha McNamara (1853–1931)
- Hilma Molyneux Parkes (1859 - 1909)
- Rose Scott (1847–1925)
- Margaret Windeyer (1866–1939)

== The Australian Woman magazine ==
Started in 1894, this magazine was the official organ of the Womanhood Suffrage League of New South Wales and was entirely edited by women working from offices at 80 Albion Street, Sydney. According to their Managing Editor, the intent of the publication was to make the Governments of Australia in general, and that of New South Wales in particular, understand they were:

not asking the privilege of being allowed to vote. We are not "your humble petitioners," and therefore do not "forever pray." The whole thing resolves into this. We have made up our minds to vote, we intend to vote, and we will vote. Do you understand, or don't you want to?

=== First editorial team ===
- Corresponding Editor – Miss E. Brown
- Business Editor – Emily Whitton
- Advertisement Editor – Mrs Minnie Broderick
- Managing Editor – T. S. Orfl

== See also ==
- Women in Australia
- Women's suffrage in Australia
