= Hilda May Abba =

Australian Congregationalist minister and academic

- Born: 30 May 1918; Birmingham, United Kingdom
- Died: 1 December 2005 (aged 87)
- Occupations: Christian minister and academic
- Known for: First woman in Australia to be ordained as a theological lecturer in 1952, by the Congregational church.

Hilda May Abba (30 May 1918 – 1 December 2005) was an Australian Christian minister and academic. She was the first woman in Australia to be ordained as a theological lecturer in 1952, by the Congregational church.

== Early life and education ==
Hilda May Blackham was born on 30 May 1918 in Birmingham. She qualified as a teacher at Homerton College, Cambridge in 1936.

Abba attained a BA (Hons) in History from Sheffield University in 1943 and graduated from the Melbourne College of Divinity with a Bachelor of Divinity in 1951. She later obtained a Master of Arts in Christian Education and a doctorate in humanities.

== Career ==
Abba preached her first sermon at the beginning of World War II, on Psalm 121 at Cemetery Road Congregational Church in Sheffield where her husband was the minister.

After moving to Australia, Abba was a tutor at the Camden Theological College in Glebe from 1948, where her husband was warden and principal. On 8 October 1951, she became the first woman in Australia to be ordained as a theological lecturer at Pitt St Congregational Church in Sydney. From 1952, she taught Church history at St. Andrew's College at the University of Sydney. She was also the Minister at Balmain Congregational Church. She was a member of the Society for Old Testament Study in the UK and the Fellowship for Biblical Studies in Australia.

In May 1955, Abba and Winifred Kiek told the Congregational Church Assembly in Brisbane that they were "not finding it easy to carry out their pastoral duties" and that there "seemed to be a prejudice against women ministers."

In 1955, Abba and her family returned to the UK, where she worked at various schools in religious education. They returned to Australia in 1977 for Abba and her husband to take up a joint appointment as ministers in the Hampton Uniting Church Parish in Melbourne. In 1980 they moved to St John's Uniting Church in Essendon and in 1982 to St John's Uniting Church in Cowes, Phillip Island. Abba retired in 1987.

== Personal life ==
Abba was married to Rev. Raymond Abba and they had two children, Elizabeth Mary and David John. In 2003, she attended the 150th anniversary of St Andrews Church in Balmain. She died on 1 December 2005 and is buried at Macquarie Park.
