= St Ursula's College, Yeppoon =

St Ursula's College
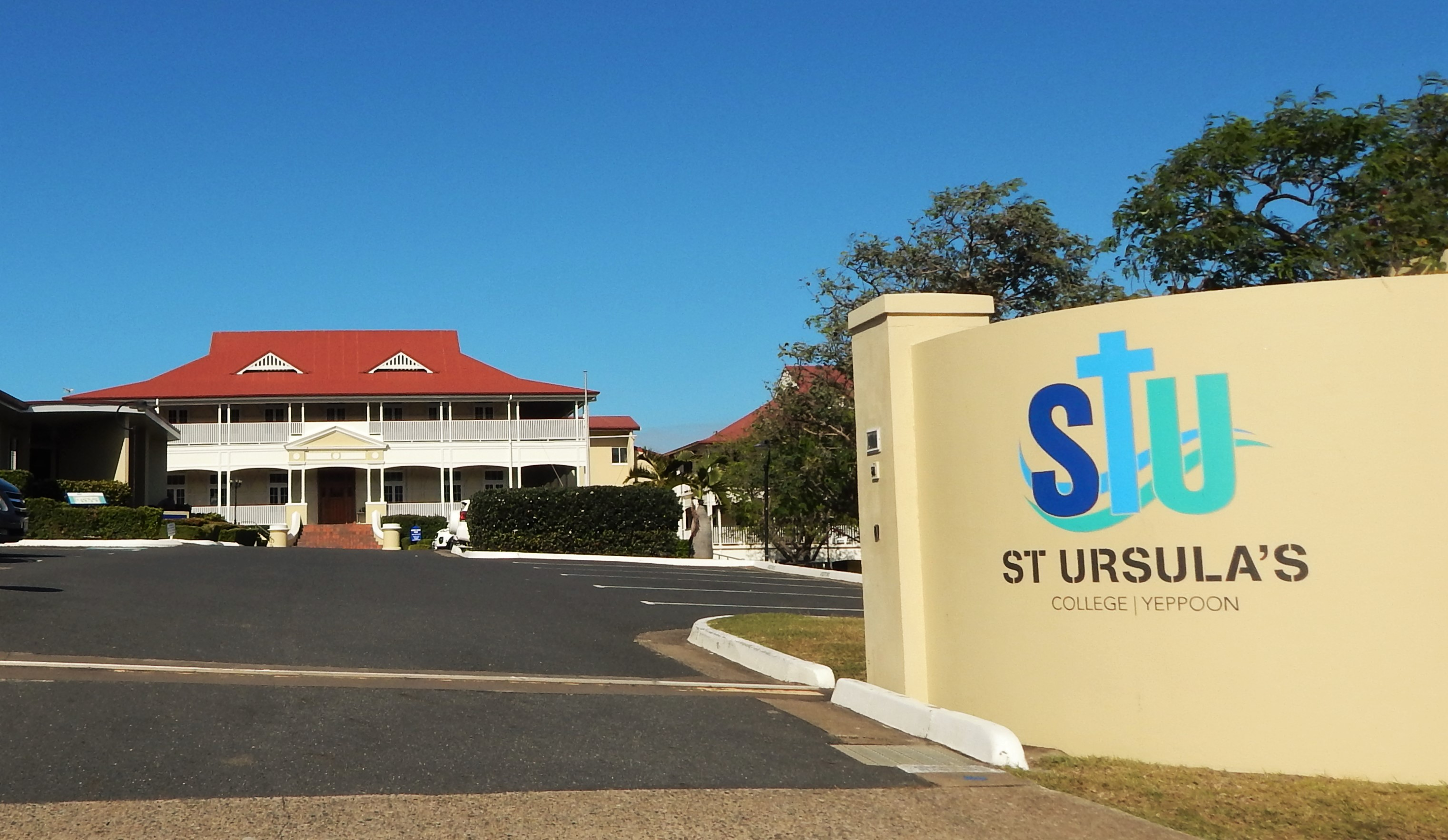
- St Ursula's College, 2022

Location
- Yeppoon, Queensland; Australia; 23°07′45.4″S 150°44′38.3″E

Information
- Type: Secondary girls
- Motto: Perfect My Steps
- Established: 1918
- Founder: Presentation Sisters
- Principal: Deborah Ryan (since 2021)
- Grades: 7–12
- Houses: Nagle, Shiel, Madden and Kennedy
- Colours: Teal and navy
- Affiliations: Independent Catholic
- Website: www.stursulas.qld.edu.au

St Ursula's College, Yeppoon, is an independent Catholic Girls', secondary and Boarding School located in the town of Yeppoon, in Central Queensland, Australia. It is administered by the Queensland Catholic Education Commission, with an enrolment of 553 students and a teaching staff of 50, as of 2023. The school serves students from Year 7 to Year 12, and is the only all-girls, Catholic day and boarding secondary school in Central Queensland.

== History ==
The school's history began in 1915 when Bishop Joseph Shiel proposed a Branch House for the Sisters of the Presentation of the Blessed Virgin Mary be established at Yeppoon.

Mother Ursula Kennedy and Mother Patrick Madden, two Presentation Sisters, visited Yeppoon and selected a one-acre block in Queen Street for the construction of the branch house, which at the suggestion of Bishop Shiel became known as St Ursula's.

The two-storey St Ursula's Convent, with St Joseph's Primary School on the ground floor, was officially opened by Bishop Joseph Shiel on 21 January 1917. Twenty-five boarding students and thirty primary students began attending the school 29 January 1917.

With a demand for specialised education for young woman becoming apparent, St Ursula's College was officially opened at the site on 12 March 1918, with an enrolment of 32 students. The primary school was on the ground floor, with the secondary school on the first floor.

In 1922, a new building was erected which is now called Gabriel Hogan House.

With a surge in the number of primary school students in the 1950s, it was decided to establish a separate school with the Sacred Heart Primary School opening in John Street in 1958. Sacred Heart Primary School relocated again in 1991, to Lammermoor.

In 1992, the Presentation Sisters formed St Ursula's College Limited, ensuring the school would continue to follow the Presentation tradition after religious leadership had stopped.

The first lay principal of St Ursula's College was Margaret Ramsay, who was appointed in 1996. However, the Presentation Sisters remained on the staff at St Ursula's College until 2011.

The Queensland Presentation Congregation transferred governance of St Ursula's College to Mercy Partners in June 2014.

A century of catholic education and presentation presence on the Capricorn Coast was celebrated in July 2017.

In 2018, St Ursula's College celebrated the school's centenary with a three days of celebrations.

== School ==
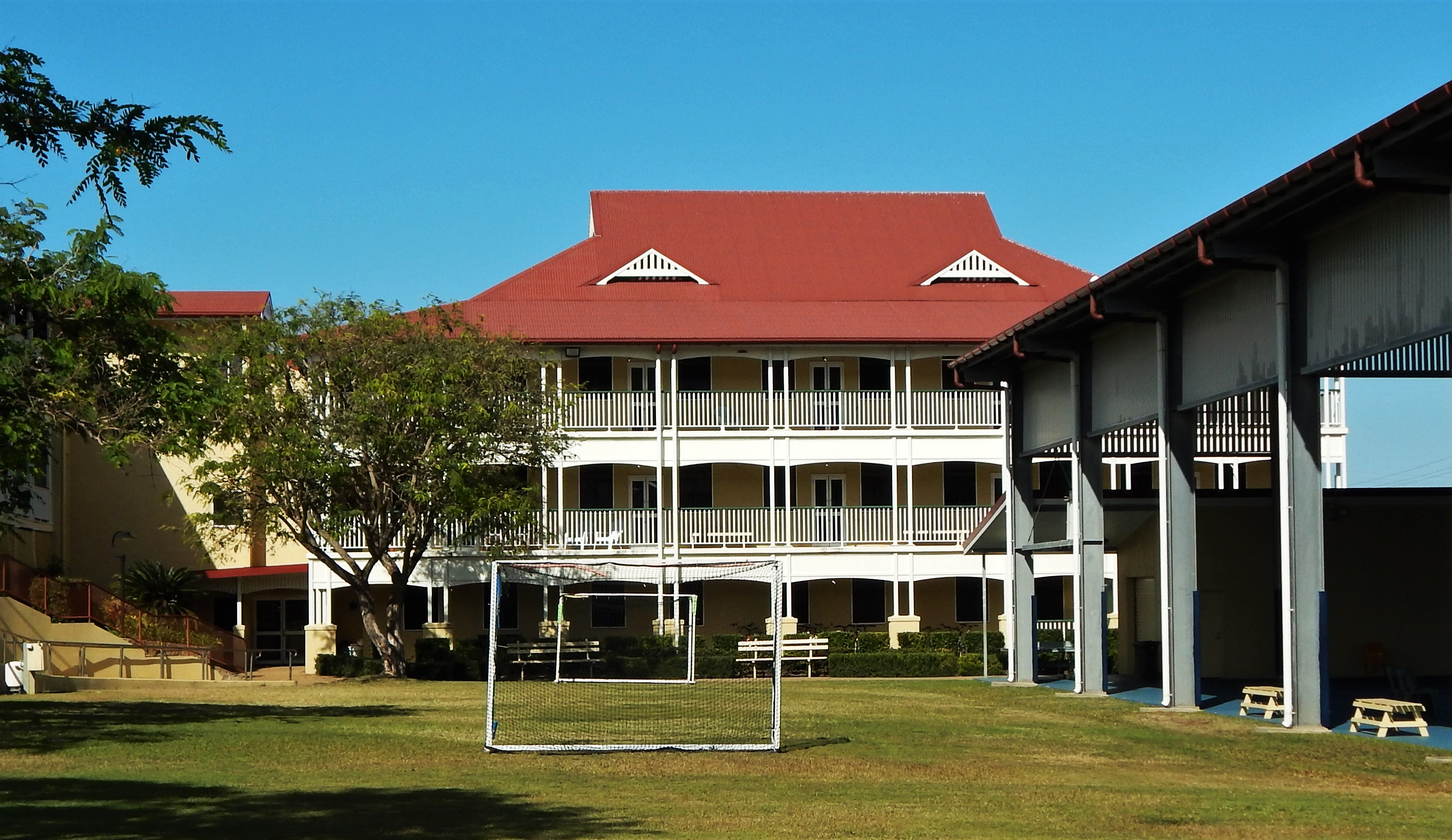
St Ursula's College, 2022

The College campus is located in the Yeppoon central business district. The Boarding House is a three-storey Queenslander-style building that accommodates the changing needs of boarding students. Plans were submitted to Livingstone Shire Council in 2021 for a proposed expansion of the school. The plans included the construction of a new two-storey education block with new amenities, courtyard and covered area which would replace an existing building which would be demolished.

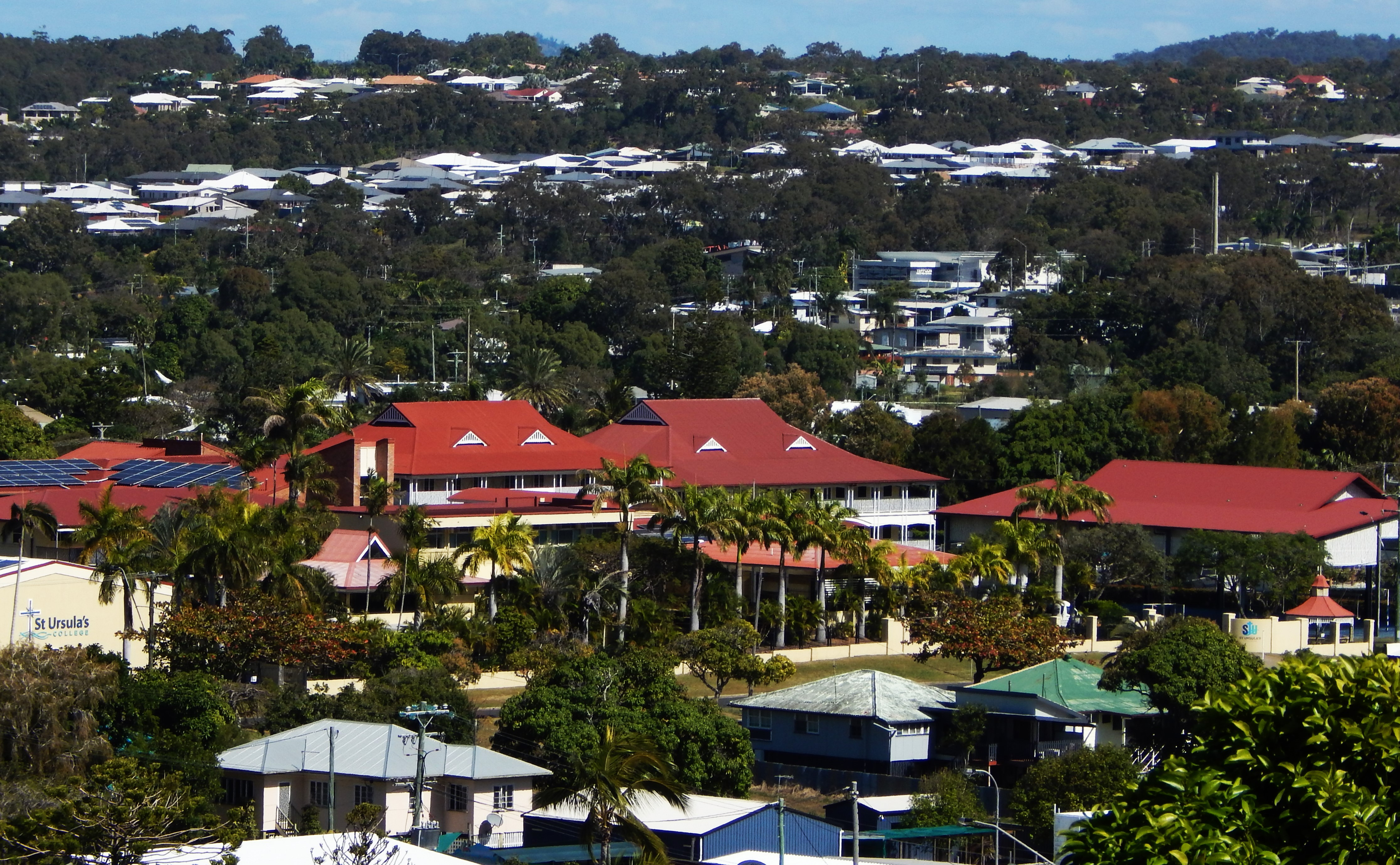
The view of St Ursula's College from Cliff Street, 2022

The college's "sister school" is St Agnes' Girls School in Kyoto.

== Notable staff ==
- Rosa MacGinley, a presentation sister and academic was the head of the school from 1954 to 1967.
- Courtney Winfield-Hill, cricketer and rugby league player, was working as a physical education teacher in 2010.

== Notable Alumni ==
- Kara Cook, Federal Member for Bonner, elected at the 2025 Federal Election.
