= Tambaroora =

Locality in New South Wales, Australia

Coordinates: 32°59′49.6″S 149°25′29.6″E

Tambaroora is a locality in the Bathurst Regional Council local government area of the Central West of New South Wales, Australia. There was once a gold mining town of the same name, now a ghost town. It lies to the immediate north of Hill End, the growth of which was largely responsible for the decline of Tambaroora. Parts of the locality are parts of the Hill End Historic Site. In 2021, it had a population of 30.

The area now known as Tambaroora lies within the traditional land of Wiradjuri people. The name Tambaroora is said to mean 'sweet grass' and, before it was drastically altered by mining and erosion, the area was said to have been a favoured by grazing kangaroos. Tambaroora is also used as the name of the cadestral parish containing the former town site and neighbouring Hill End.

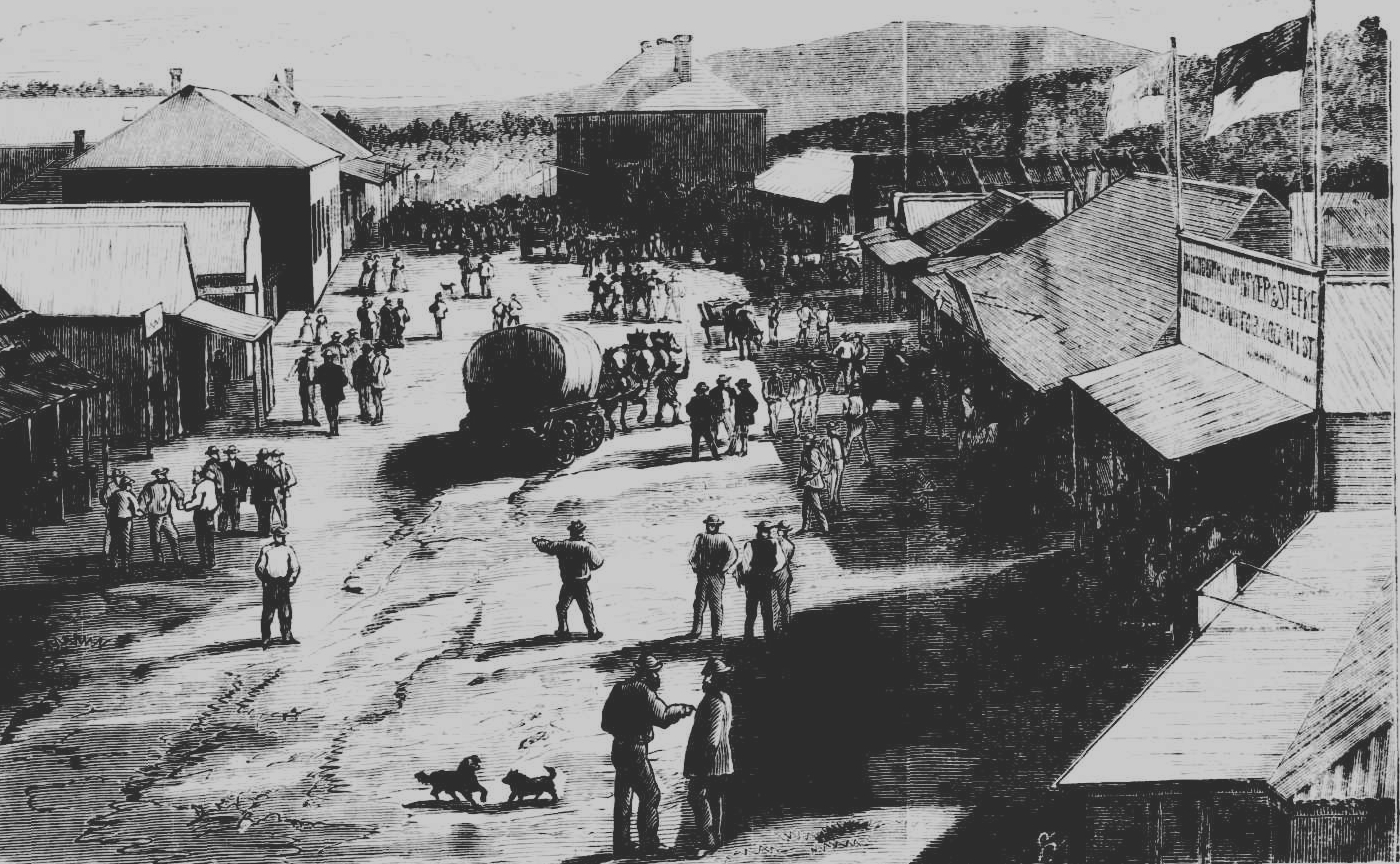
Clarke Street, Tambaroora (1872)

Tambaroora was once a substantial township, servicing the surrounding goldfield. The focus of gold mining moved south to the rich quartz reef mines of Hawkin's Hill at Hill End, beginning the decline the town. Tambaroora is all but gone now.

Two cemeteries at Tambaroora, Tambaroora General Cemetery and a separate Catholic cemetery, remained in use after settlement shifted to nearby Hill End. The General Cemetery is the most significant remnant at the site of the former township. There was also a Chinese burial ground and a Temple on Red Hill. The last old-time Chinese resident of Tambaroora was Nu (or Mew) Chip who in later years grew vegetables for a living. He died in 1937.

Significant remnants of gold mining in the locality are the Quartz Roasting Pits, the Tambaroora Creek Dam, and Valantines Mine. The mined and heavily eroded landscape of Golden Gully lies between Tambaroora and Hill End. The locality also has a designated fossicking area.
