= Golden Gully and Archway =

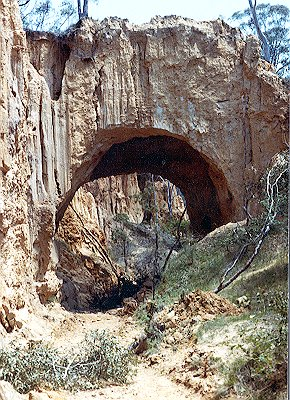
- The Grand Arch was approximately 5 metres (16 ft) in diameter

- Location within New South Wales Location within Australia
- 33.0159°S 149.4163°E
- Location: Golden Gully, Hill End, Bathurst Region, New South Wales, Australia

New South Wales Heritage Register
- Official name: Golden Gully and Archway
- Type: state heritage (archaeological-terrestrial)
- Designated: 2 April 1999
- Reference no.: 614
- Type: Alluvial Workings
- Category: Mining and Mineral Processing
- Builders: European and Chinese gold miners

Golden Gully and Archway is a heritage-listed former mining and now pastoral property at Golden Gully, Hill End in the Central West region of New South Wales, Australia. It was built by European and Chinese gold miners. It was added to the New South Wales State Heritage Register on 2 April 1999.

== History ==
Golden Gully was created by European and Chinese miners during the 19th century. With the onset of the 1851 gold rush, the miners sank shafts, adits and drives to retrieve the alluvial gold deposits which settled on an ancient buried river bed.

In 1983 the National Parks and Wildlife Service nominated the site for listing under the Heritage Act. The site was under threat of damage and disturbance from proposed commercial mining operations. Following site visits and discussions with National Parks and Wildlife Service, Department of Mineral Resources and mining companies an Interim Conservation Order was placed over the site in 1987. A Permanent Conservation Order was placed over site on 2 September 1988. On 2 April 1999 the site was transferred onto the State Heritage Register.

== Description ==
Golden Gully and Archway is a deeply incised man induced braided channel system. The Gully banks contain shafts and drives that demonstrate the mining techniques used by European and Chinese miners to reach gold deposits.

Intensive and successive fossicking activities had led to a massive landscape alteration. The course of the Tambaroora Creek has been changed and variegated and in all sections its bed has been lowered below the 1851 level. The combined action of fossicking and erosion and sculptured the former banks of the creek into spires, organ pipes and arches. When viewed from within the Gully these structures appear to change colour according to the time of day and incidence of direct sunlight. The Grand Arch at Golden Gully collapsed after a prolonged period of wet weather in November 2021. No trace of it remains.

== Heritage listing ==
As at 26 November 1999, Golden Gully and Archway is a major site on the Hill End-Tambaroora goldfield where large scale alluvial fossicking was undertaken by European and Chinese miners. The gully is evidence of the onset of the 1851 goldrush. It displays the difference between European and Chinese mining techniques during the 19th century. In particular the eroded gully has exposed the square European shafts and the round Chinese shafts in a dramatic and unique landscape.

Golden Gully and Archway was listed on the New South Wales State Heritage Register on 2 April 1999.
