= Bertha McNamara =

Australian writer and political activist

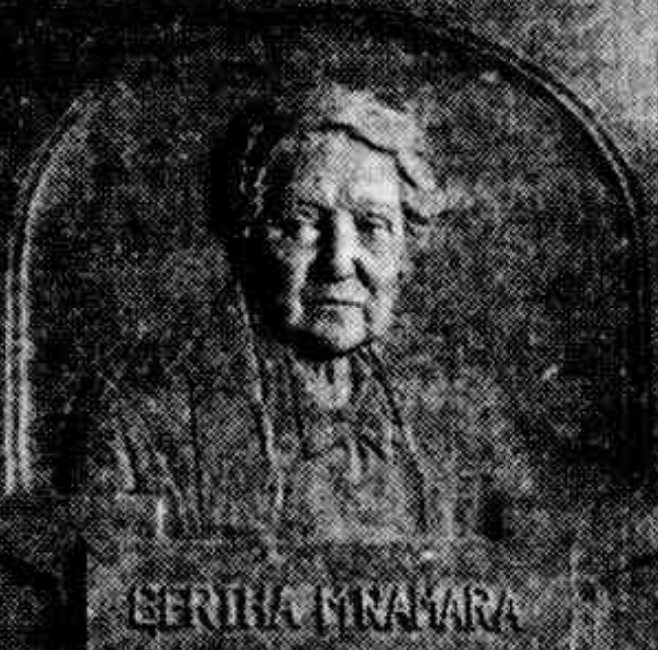
Bronze bas relief of Bertha McNamara

Matilda Emilie Bertha McNamara (née Kalkstein, previously Bredt; 28 September 1853 – 1 August 1931) was an Australian political activist and writer. She was born in Prussia and arrived in Australia as a teenager. She became involved in the labour movement in the early 1890s until the 1920s, running a socialist bookshop in Sydney and authoring numerous political pamphlets; she was eulogised as "the mother of the labour movement". She was the mother of eleven children, and her sons-in-law included the writer Henry Lawson and politician Jack Lang.

== Life ==
McNamara was born on 28 September 1853 in Posen, Prussia (present-day Poznań, Poland). Her parents were Paulina Wilhelmina (née Berndt) and Karl Frederick Kalkstein, her father being a civil servant. When she was a teenager, "economic difficulties broke up the Kalkstein home", and she was sent to Australia to live with relatives. She arrived in Melbourne in 1869 and lived with an uncle for six months, subsequently moving to Bairnsdale, Victoria, to work as the governess for her aunt Mrs Drevermann. On 26 February 1872, she married Peter Hermann Bredt, a Prussian-born accountant who worked as the secretary for the Bairnsdale Shire Council. The couple had nine children, three of whom died in infancy; three sons and three daughters survived to adulthood.

After being widowed in 1888, McNamara moved to Melbourne and began working as a travelling saleswoman, selling jewellery and sewing machines. She became a political activist and published Home Talk on Socialism (1891), one of Australia's first pamphlets on socialism. On 9 July 1892 she married William McNamara founding member and secretary of the Australian Socialist League. As a result of his political publications criticizing the banks, William was sent to jail for libel.

In Castlereagh St, Sydney, she ran a boarding-house in conjunction with McNamara's Book and News Depot. Bertha McNamara, who has been called 'The Mother of the Labour Movement', carried on agitating for social reform for 25 years after the death of her second husband.

In 1896, her daughter, also named Bertha, married Henry Lawson. Another daughter, Hilda, married prominent Labor Party politician Jack Lang.

== Affiliations ==
She was a member of the Social Democratic Federation of Australasia, Australian Labour Party, Labor Women's Central Organizing Committee and of Womanhood Suffrage League of New South Wales.

== Death and legacy ==
McNamara died of pneumonia at North Sydney on 1 August 1931. A bronze bas relief of Bertha McNamara, by Lyndon Dadswell, is located in Foyer of the Trades Hall (Goulburn Street, Sydney)

== Writing ==
- Commercialism and Distribution of the Nineteenth Century, Forgery and Workingmen's Homes, (1894).
- How to Become Rich Beyond the Dreams of Avarice (1908)
- Shylock Exposed, (1920).
- Paper Money (1910).
