= Hill End, New South Wales =

Hill End
- Town
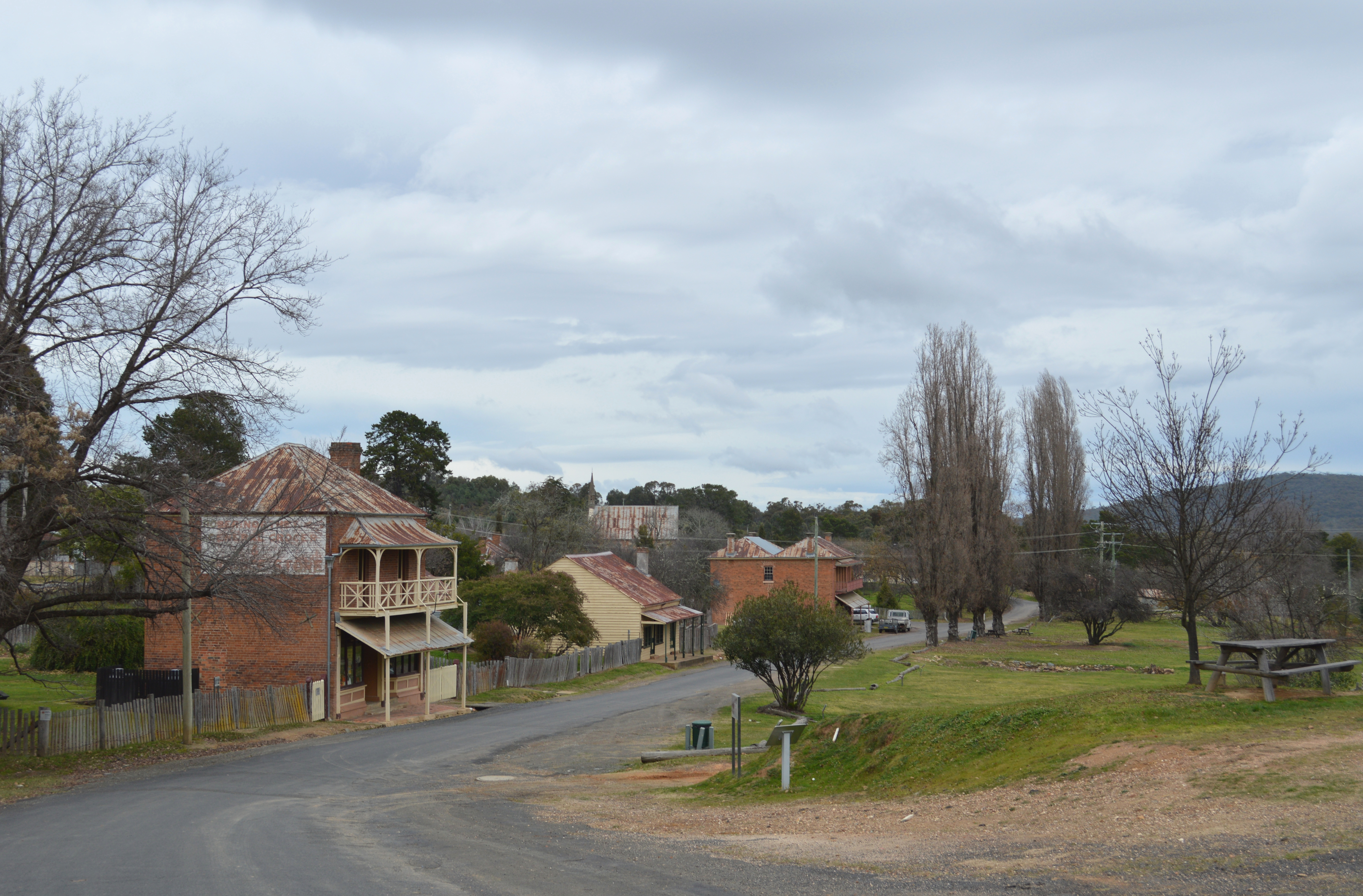
- Hill End c. 2014

- Coordinates: 33°02′0″S 149°25′0″E
- Country: Australia
- State: New South Wales
- LGA: Bathurst Regional Council
- Location: 278 km (173 mi) NW of Sydney; 75 km (47 mi) NW of Bathurst; 37 km (23 mi) W of Sofala; 73 km (45 mi) S of Mudgee
- Elevation: 887 m (2,910 ft)

Population
  - Total: 111 (SAL 2021)
- Postcode: 2850

Hill End is a former gold mining town in New South Wales, Australia. The town is located in the Bathurst Regional Council local Government area.

== History ==
What is now Hill End was originally a part of the Tambaroora area; in the 1850s the Hill End area was known as Bald Hills, and Tambaroora town was a few kilometres to the north. In 1860 a village was proclaimed, first as Forbes and then in 1862 it was renamed Hill End. Tambaroora had been the larger centre; in 1865, it had seven public houses to Hill End's two. Following the discovery of rich gold reefs at Hawkins Hill (Hill End), in the early 1870s, Hill End overtook Tambaroora as the main town in the area.

=== Gold rush and Beyers-Holtermann Specimen ===
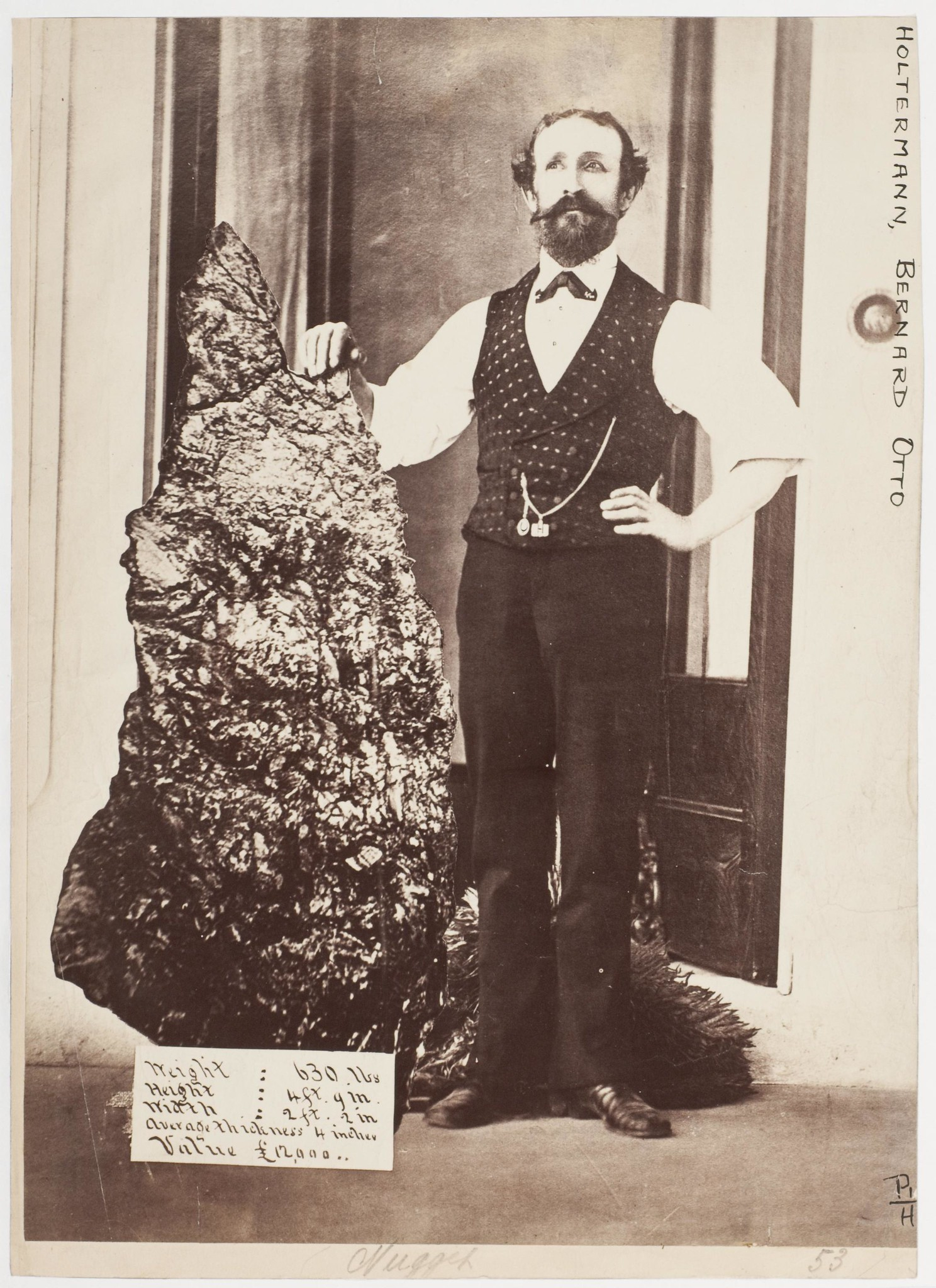
Bernhardt Holtermann with the world-record 630 lb rock containing more than 75 percent gold, discovered at the Star of Hope Mine in 1872.

Hill End owes its existence to the New South Wales gold rush of the 1850s, and at its peak in the early 1870s it had a population estimated at 8,000 served by two newspapers, five banks, eight churches and twenty-eight pubs.

On 19 October 1872, Hill End became famous for Bernhardt Holtermann's finding of the 'Beyers-Holtermann Specimen', this being the world's largest specimen of native gold ever discovered, a record that still stands today. Its single mass of quartz reef and gold weighed 630 lbs and, when crushed, produced an estimated 3,000 troy oz (205 lbs or 93 kg) of gold. Thus processed, it held more gold than the weight of the largest gold nugget ever found, that being the Welcome Stranger from the Victorian Goldfields. Holtermann, recognizing the significance of the find, attempted to preserve it whole by offering to buy it for £1,000 above the estimated market value from the Star of Hope Goldmining Company of which he and Hugo Louis Beyers were founding directors. His efforts were in vain however, and the specimen was shipped out for crushing. It is reported that a larger mass was discovered a few days later in the same mine but was broken up underground.

The town's decline when the gold eventually gave out was dramatic: by 1945 the population was 700. At the 2006 census, Hill End had a population of 166, which dropped to 80 people during the year 2017. The photographer Beaufoy Merlin recorded daily life in the town at its peak; his photographs can be found in the town museum/visitor information centre. The glass plate negatives are held in the State Library of New South Wales.

=== Development ===
In October 1862 the Telegraph line reached Hill End (Tambaroora) from Bathurst via Sofala, the Telegraph Office opened for telegraph messages bringing the remote town into instant contact with the rest of the Colony. Prior to this event communications took 12 hours by the mail stagecoach to Bathurst.

After delays due to lack of materials a telephone line was installed into Hill End in 1914; after 60 years of Morse code telegraph messages Hill End could now speak to adjacent towns and even Sydney if necessary.

In 1923 a telephone exchange was installed at the Hill End Post Office; before this calls could only be made from the Post Office to other towns. The exchange allowed new telephones installed in businesses and private homes to connect locally and to other towns.

=== Hill End artists colony ===
In the late 1940s Hill End was discovered by artists Russell Drysdale, who painted possibly his best-known work, The cricketers there, and Donald Friend, and it quickly became an artists' colony. Other artists who worked there included Jean Bellette. Today, the Hill End artist-in-residence program aims to ensure the continuity of this connection.

== Heritage listings ==
Hill End has a number of heritage-listed sites, including:

- Hill End Historic Site
- Golden Gully: Golden Gully and Archway
- 10 km North: Quartz Roasting Pits Complex

== Hill End and Tambaroora family history research ==
The Hill End & Tambaroora Gathering Group has been in existence since the 1930s. Their goal is to provide information on the life, the families and events of a bygone era and to connect their worldwide community of descendants who have an affiliation to the district. Their website contains transcriptions of many primary records, listing names of the early miners and pioneers, that may not appear in the more mainstream family history resources.

== Hill End today ==
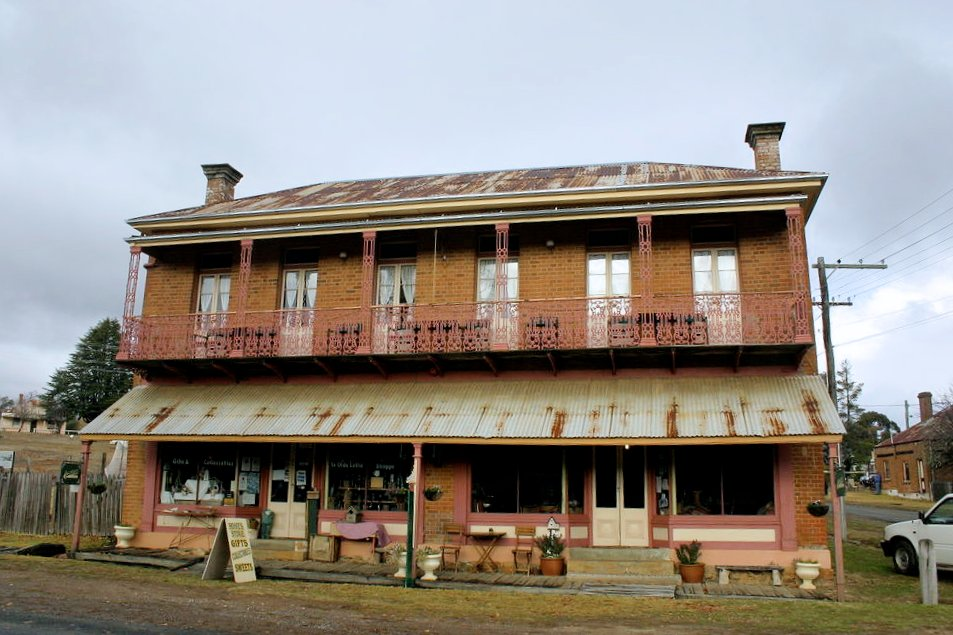
Hill End B&B (Hosies) Gifts Crafts & Collectables

Hill End is classified as a historical site by the National Parks and Wildlife Service (NPWS). However, it is still home to a handful of residents operating the local pub, general store, cake store and antique store. The NPWS runs a museum just off the main road which contains many original photos and items of equipment from the busy days of the gold rush. A more extensive museum, the privately owned History Hill, is located a few kilometres from the town on the Bathurst Road.

NPWS has installed signs around the town to give visitors an idea of what was once in place on the now empty lots of land. Currently only a handful of buildings remain in their original form. However, most of those buildings still serve the purpose they did back during the gold rush. Access to the town's lookouts is via gravel roads. A walking track in the town leads to a mine and other ruins.

The most popular tourist activity in Hill End is gold panning with some of the older members of the community running gold panning tours in the same fossicking areas that yielded the gold which brought on the gold rush. Metal detectors or gold panning are not allowed within the historic site; however, there is a fossicking area just past the cemetery off the Mudgee Road.

The Royal Hotel and the local "bed and breakfasts" offer accommodation and there are a number of camping options within the town limits.

== Bridle Track ==
The Bridle Track is a famous and rugged 52-kilometre historic trail in the Central West region of New South Wales, connecting the former gold rush town of Hill End with Bathurst. Established in the mid-19th century as a narrow path for horses and pedestrians, it earned its name from sections so steep and precarious that miners had to lead their mounts by the bridle. Today, the track mostly follows the Macquarie and Turon Rivers, offering an adventurous route through dramatic gorge country, and remains a popular destination for four-wheel drivers, campers, and history enthusiasts, complete with visible remnants of old mining activity along the way.

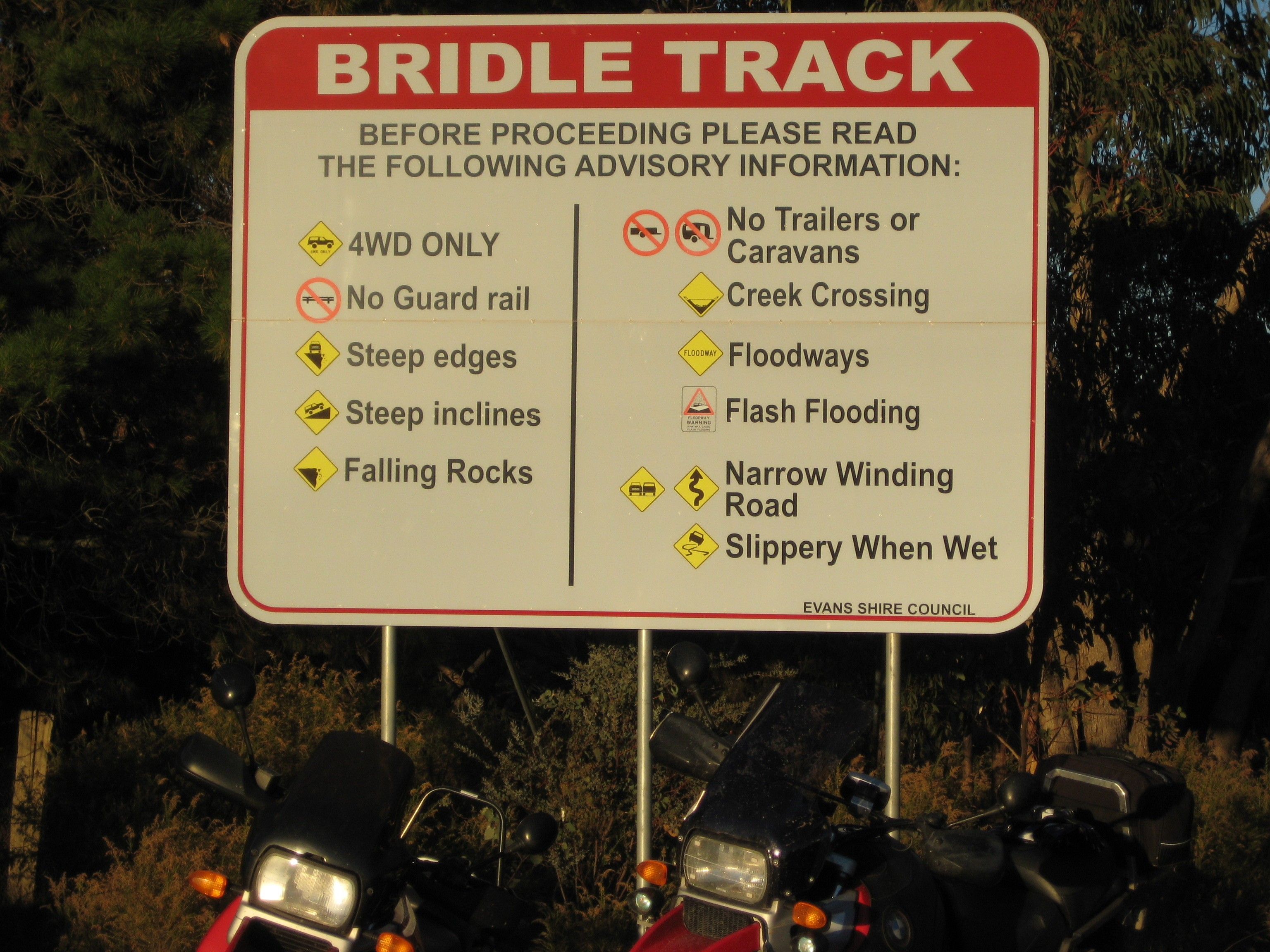
Entrance to the Bridle Track from Hill End

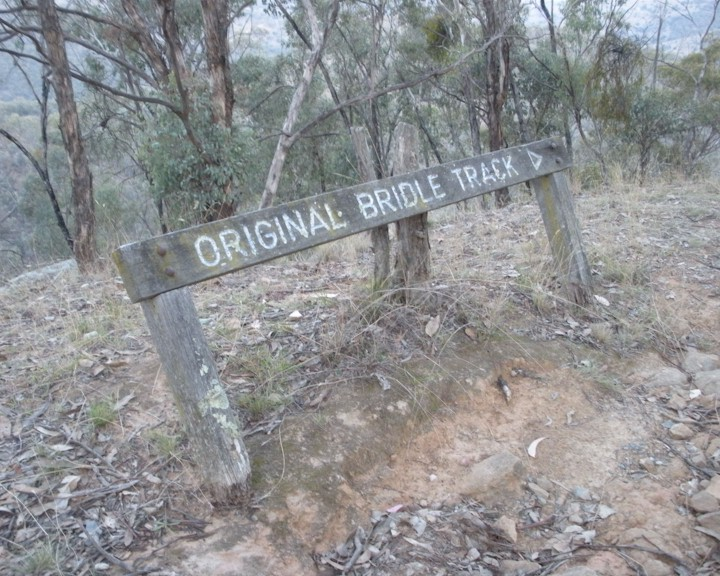
Original Bridle Track Hill End

== Access ==
- From Sofala, New South Wales which is around 38 kilometres (24 mi).
- From Mudgee which is around 75 kilometres (47 mi) and the route passes through Hargraves.
- From Bathurst, New South Wales via Turondale is around 75 kilometres (47 mi).

== Camping ==
The National Parks and Wildlife Service provides several camping sites.

== Notable people ==
- Selina Sarah Elizabeth Anderson (1878–1964), parliamentary candidate.
- Colin Simpson (1908-1983), Australian journalist, author and traveller spent most of his childhood in Hill End where his aunt and uncle ran the Royal Hotel.

== See also ==
- Australian gold rushes
- Gold mining
