= Australian Catholic Historical Society =

Sydney based historical society

- Australian Catholic Historical Society Logo
- Formation: 1940
- Type: Historical society
- Headquarters: Sydney, NSW
- Members: ~150
- Official language: English
- Website: ACHS website

The Australian Catholic Historical Society discusses Australian Catholic history via a newsletter and meetings, and is focussed around Sydney.

== Leadership ==
The society was founded in 1940 in Sydney, by a group of students of Australian Catholic history led by Fr (later Archbishop) Eris O'Brien and Sydney solicitor Brian McGrath. It was revived in the 1960s through the efforts of Monsignor Cornelius (Con) Duffy. Since then it has maintained a program of talks and published research. Currently it holds talks in Sydney monthly.

The patron is the Archbishop of Sydney. As of 2026, the president is Fr Brian Lucas.

== Activities ==
The Society publishes the Journal of the Australian Catholic Historical Society, with one issue per year. It was first published in 1954 on the recommendation of the Vatican. Since 2011 the editor has been James Franklin of the University of New South Wales. The Society also publishes four newsletters each year.

The Society has a Melbourne chapter which holds occasional talks.

In 2016 the Society held a conference 'To and from the Antipodes: Catholic missionaries over two centuries'. Its proceedings appear as a special issue of the Journal.

In 2026 the Society published a book on its own history, A Dialogue Between Past and Present: The Australian Catholic Historical Society and Sydney Catholics 1940-2026.

The Society presents the James MacGinley Award for students and early career researchers writing on Australian Catholic history.

== See also ==
- Catholic Church in Australia
