= Kate Dwyer =

Australian suffragist and labour activist

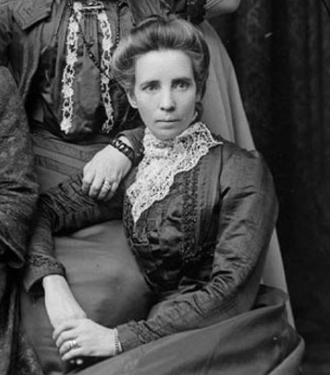
- Born: Catherine Winifred Golding; 13 June 1861; Tambaroora, New South Wales, Australia
- Died: 3 February 1949 (aged 87); Sydney, New South Wales, Australia
- Occupations: Educator; suffragist; labor activist
- Known for: founder of the Women's Progressive Association
- Spouse: Michael Dwyer (m. 1887)

Catherine Winifred Dwyer (née Golding; 13 June 1861 – 3 February 1949) was an Australian educator, suffragist, and labour activist.

== Early life and education ==
Dwyer née Golding was born at Tambaroora, Wellington County, New South Wales to Joseph Golding (died 1890), a gold-miner from Galway, Ireland, and his Scottish wife, Ann (died 1906; née Fraser). She was educated at Hill End Public School.

== Career ==
In 1880 Dwyer began teaching at Tambaroora Public School, she taught at numerous public primary school in New South Wales until she married fellow school teacher Michael Dwyer in 1887. From 1894 they lived in Sydney where Dwyer became a member of the Womanhood Suffrage League of New South Wales, her sisters, Annie and Belle were also members.

Dwyer was a founder of the Women's Progressive Association in 1901, the organisation promoted the entry of women into legal professions and equal benefits for women following divorce. Interested in women's working conditions she also founded the Women Workers' Union for home and fringe factory workers. She was one of six women elected to the New South Wales Labor Party's executive in January 1906. The other five were Edith Bethel, Harriet Powell, the 1903 parliamentary candidate Selina Siggins, the American-born A. E. Gardiner, Mary Anne Grant, and Maggie Hall.

Dwyer was active in the "no conscription" during World War I. In 1916 Dwyer was the first woman in Australia to be elected a member of the Senate of the University of Sydney. In that capacity in 1918 she moved a resolution to support the introduction of legislation for women to enter the legal profession. In May 1921 she was one of the first 61 women to be appointed justices of the peace in New South Wales.

Dwyer died on 3 February 1949 in Sydney, New South Wales, Australia.

== Legacy ==
Dwyer Street in Cook, a suburb of Canberra, is named in her honour.

== See also ==
- List of suffragists and suffragettes
