= Belle Golding =

Australian feminist, suffragist and labour activist

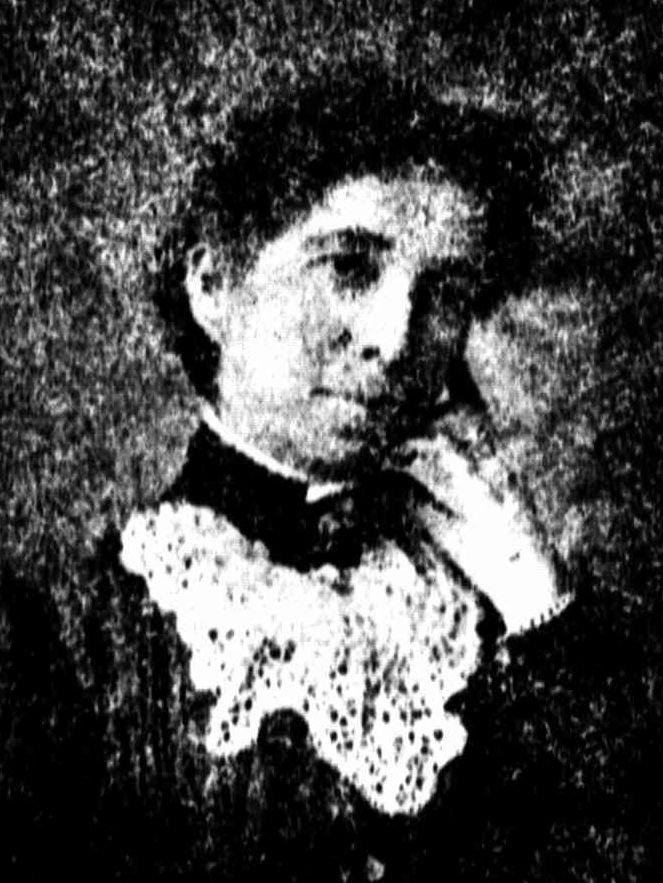
- Belle Golding in 1903
- Born: Isabella Theresa Golding; November 25, 1864; Tambaroora, New South Wales, Australia
- Died: 11 December 1940 (aged 76); Annandale, New South Wales, Australia
- Occupations: suffragist, labour activist

Isabella Theresa "Belle" Golding (25 November 1864 – 11 December 1940) was an Australian feminist, suffragist and labour activist. She was the first female inspector of public schools in Australia.

== Early life and education ==
Belle Golding was born in Tambaroora, in Wellington County, New South Wales, to Joseph Golding (died 1890), a gold-miner from Galway, Ireland, and his Scottish wife, Ann (née Fraser, died 1906).

== Career ==
In May 1900, Belle Golding became the first female inspector of public schools in Australia. She and her sisters, Annie Mackenzie Golding and Kate Dwyer, joined the Womanhood Suffrage League of New South Wales in about 1893, before forming the Women's Progressive Association in 1904.

Under the Early Closing Act of 1899, Golding became Australia's first female inspector of public schools. Throughout her career as a public servant, Golding exercised her passion for improving the conditions of living for women, often documenting health and employment concerns unique to women. Later, when the Wage Arbitration Act passed, she was made an industrial inspector; the first and (as of 1940) the only woman to be named Chair of a Wage Board. In that position she was able to settle the dispute between the Fruiterers and Confectioners' Employees' Union. The dispute was settled in 7.5 hours, and the award ran its full term. Golding was a co-founder of the Society for the Prevention of Cruelty to Animals in Australia.

== Death and legacy ==
After retiring due to ill health in 1926 and she was later succeeded by Louise Alice Brown in 1930. Golding's biographer speculates that Brown was briefed by Golding as they had previously worked together,

Golding died, aged 76, on 11 December 1940 at Annandale, New South Wales.

Golding Place, in the Canberra suburb of Chisholm, is named for Golding and her sister Annie Mackenzie Golding.
