= Annie Mackenzie Golding =

Church worker and women's rights advocate

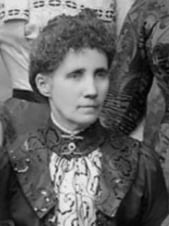
- Born: 27 October 1855; Tambaroora, New South Wales, Australia
- Died: 28 December 1934 (aged 79); Lewisham, New South Wales, Australia
- Occupation: Teacher

Annie Mackenzie Golding (27 October 1855 – 28 December 1934) was an Australian teacher, suffragist and feminist activist.

== Early life ==
Annie Golding was born at Tambaroora, New South Wales. She was the eldest daughter of Ann (née Fraser) and her husband Joseph Golding. Her family was Catholic.

== Career ==
Golding trained as a teacher and worked at Sallys Flat Provisional School, Bathurst. Golding was a member of the Committee of Public School Teacher's Institute, the Council of NSW Public School Teachers' Association 1897–1915.

== Activism ==
With her sisters, Belle and Kate, Golding was a key member of the suffragette movement in New South Wales. Families provided a network of support in for people working in political and social reform movements at this time. She was a member Womanhood Suffrage League NSW and a founding member and president of the Women's Progressive Association.

Golding was involved in the development of the Women's Workers Union. In 1934, she gave a speech titled "What Women Have Secured Through The Vote" at Adyar Hall.

== Death and legacy ==
Golding died on 28 December 1934 at Lewisham Hospital of injuries from an accident when alighting from a tram a month before. After a funeral mass at St. Brendan's Church, Annandale she was buried at Waverley Cemetery on 31 December 1934.

Golding Place, in the Canberra suburb of Chisholm, is named for Golding and her sister Belle Golding.
