= Wellington County, New South Wales =

Wellington New South Wales
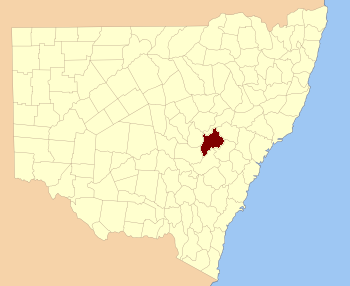
- Location in New South Wales
Lands administrative divisions around Wellington:
Gordon	Bligh	Phillip
Ashburnham	Wellington	Roxburgh
Ashburnham	Bathurst	Roxburgh

Wellington County is a county in New South Wales, Australia, which was one of the original Nineteen Counties. The town of Wellington is near the north-eastern edge. The Bell River is the boundary to the west, and the Cudgegong River to the north. It includes land on both sides of the Macquarie River.

It contains the town of Mudgee, where the first house was stated to have been built in 1837 by John Blackman.

There is a modern-day local government area called just "Wellington Council".

Wellington County was named in honour of Arthur Wellesley, Duke of Wellington (1769–1852).

== Parishes within this county ==
A full list of parishes found within this county; their current LGA and mapping coordinates to the approximate centre of each location is as follows:

Parish	LGA	Coordinates
Avisford	Mid-Western Regional Council	32°44′54″S 149°30′04″E
Biraganbil	Mid-Western Regional Council	32°24′54″S 149°25′04″E
Boduldura	Dubbo Regional Council	32°52′54″S 149°06′04″E
Boiga	Mid-Western Regional Council	32°53′54″S 149°30′04″E
Boomey	Cabonne Shire	32°57′54″S 148°57′04″E
Boomey	Cabonne Shire	32°59′54″S 149°00′04″E
Borenore	Cabonne Shire	33°14′54″S 149°02′04″E
Broombee	Mid-Western Regional Council	32°40′54″S 149°39′04″E
Burrendong	Dubbo Regional Council	32°43′54″S 149°06′04″E
Canning	Dubbo Regional Council	32°38′54″S 149°16′04″E
Carroll	Bathurst Regional Council	32°59′54″S 149°30′04″E
Carroll	Mid-Western Regional Council	32°58′54″S 149°28′04″E
Coolamin	Dubbo Regional Council	32°59′54″S 149°11′04″E
Cooper	Dubbo Regional Council	32°52′54″S 149°04′04″E
Cooper	Dubbo Regional Council	32°52′54″S 148°59′04″E
Copper Hill	Cabonne Shire	32°58′54″S 148°52′04″E
Cummings	Mid-Western Regional Council	32°57′54″S 149°24′04″E
Cunningham	Bathurst Regional Council	33°00′54″S 149°35′04″E
Curragurra	Dubbo Regional Council	32°51′54″S 149°10′04″E
Erudgere	Mid-Western Regional Council	32°31′54″S 149°27′04″E
Forbes	Cabonne Shire	33°02′54″S 149°14′04″E
Galwadgere	Dubbo Regional Council	32°38′54″S 148°59′04″E
Gamboola	Cabonne Shire	33°08′54″S 149°00′04″E
Grattai	Mid-Western Regional Council	32°41′54″S 149°27′04″E
Hargraves	Mid-Western Regional Council	32°44′54″S 149°27′04″E
Ironbarks	Dubbo Regional Council	32°47′54″S 148°59′04″E
Kerr	Mid-Western Regional Council	32°43′54″S 149°20′04″E
Larras Lake	Cabonne Shire	33°02′54″S 149°03′04″E
Lewis	Cabonne Shire	33°07′54″S 149°12′04″E
March	Cabonne Shire	33°13′54″S 149°08′04″E
Merinda	Mid-Western Regional Council	32°33′54″S 149°19′04″E
Millenbong	Mid-Western Regional Council	32°41′54″S 149°22′04″E
Muckerwa	Dubbo Regional Council	32°48′54″S 149°10′04″E
Mudgee	Mid-Western Regional Council	32°37′54″S 149°33′04″E
Mulyan	Cabonne Shire	33°05′54″S 149°03′04″E
Mumbil	Dubbo Regional Council	32°39′54″S 148°58′04″E
Munna	Mid-Western Regional Council	32°32′54″S 149°32′04″E
Nubrigyn	Dubbo Regional Council	32°55′54″S 149°01′04″E
Orange	Cabonne Shire	33°16′54″S 149°04′04″E
Peters	Mid-Western Regional Council	32°56′54″S 149°28′04″E
Piambong	Mid-Western Regional Council	32°28′54″S 149°24′04″E
Rouse	Mid-Western Regional Council	32°27′54″S 149°17′04″E
Suttor	Dubbo Regional Council	32°42′54″S 149°14′04″E
Tambaroora	Bathurst Regional Council	33°02′54″S 149°23′04″E
Tannabutta	Mid-Western Regional Council	32°43′54″S 149°44′04″E
Tatuali	Mid-Western Regional Council	32°52′54″S 149°22′04″E
Three Rivers	Cabonne Shire	32°57′54″S 148°54′04″E
Toolamanang	Mid-Western Regional Council	32°50′54″S 149°40′04″E
Towac	Cabonne Shire	33°17′54″S 149°00′04″E
Triamble	Mid-Western Regional Council	32°51′54″S 149°17′04″E
Trudgett	Dubbo Regional Council	33°00′54″S 149°07′04″E
Tunnabidgee	Mid-Western Regional Council	32°55′54″S 149°32′04″E
Ulmarrah	Mid-Western Regional Council	33°00′54″S 149°18′04″E
Walters	Dubbo Regional Council	32°44′54″S 149°14′04″E
Warne	Dubbo Regional Council	33°00′54″S 149°03′04″E
Warratra	Mid-Western Regional Council	32°43′54″S 149°41′04″E
Waurdong	Mid-Western Regional Council	32°53′05″S 149°26′49″E
Wear	Dubbo Regional Council	32°39′54″S 149°10′04″E
Wellington	Dubbo Regional Council	32°36′54″S 148°57′04″E
Werouera	Mid-Western Regional Council	32°37′54″S 149°25′04″E
Wiadere	Mid-Western Regional Council	32°27′54″S 149°20′04″E
Windeyer	Mid-Western Regional Council	32°46′54″S 149°30′04″E
