= Tallawang, New South Wales =

Tallawang
- Town
- Coordinates: 32°12′S 149°27′E
- Country: Australia
- State: New South Wales
- LGA: Mid-Western Regional Council
- Location: 323 km (201 mi) NW of Sydney; 125 km (78 mi) E of Dubbo; 27 km (17 mi) N of Gulgong; 15 km (9.3 mi) S of Birriwa

Government
  - State electorate: Orange
  - Federal division: Parkes

Population
  - Total: 165 (SAL 2021)
- Postcode: 2852

Tallawang is an historical locality north of Gulgong in central western New South Wales, Australia. The place name is derived from an Aboriginal word for "apple gum".

== History ==
The area now known as Tallawang (originally often spelled Tallewang) lies on the traditional lands of Wiradjuri people.

In the 1830s the area was settled by Europeans, originally raising sheep. The Tallawang area is in the valley of Tallawang Creek, which flows south into Wyaldra Creek and then subsequently to the Cudgegong River west of Gulgong.

There was an inn at Tallawang on the track and stock route which is now the Castlereagh Highway. In the 1860s gold was discovered at Tallawang and it became the site of a minor gold rush, overshadowed by the much larger discoveries of gold at Gulgong to the south of Tallawang.

In the late 19th century, many small farms at Tallawang were owned by retired gold miners, and Tallawang had an inn, school, church and stores.

In the early 20th century, an iron ore mine operated there, called Tallawang Iron Mines. A government railway line to the quarry was built, and successful ore production commenced in 1911. The ore was railed to Lithgow, where it was smelted in the Lithgow Blast Furnace. The Tallawang Iron Mines closed in February 1927. The mine was worked again from early 1952, with the magnetite ore being crushed and ground and then used in the process of coal washing. This continued up to the 1980s. More recently, underground mining of magnetite has commenced in the area.

A railway station opened in 1910, after the railway line was built from Gulgong to Dunedoo, and was closed in 1974. The hotel closed in 1922. There was a school there, from May 1881 to September 1941, with an interruption between April 1926 to October 1930. Today nothing remains Tallawang.

From 1906, Tallawang was part of the Wyaldra Shire, then the Gulgong Shire, and now is part of the Mid-Western Regional Council area, based at Mudgee.
