= Gold Mining Water Race, Windeyer =

Gold Mining Water Race
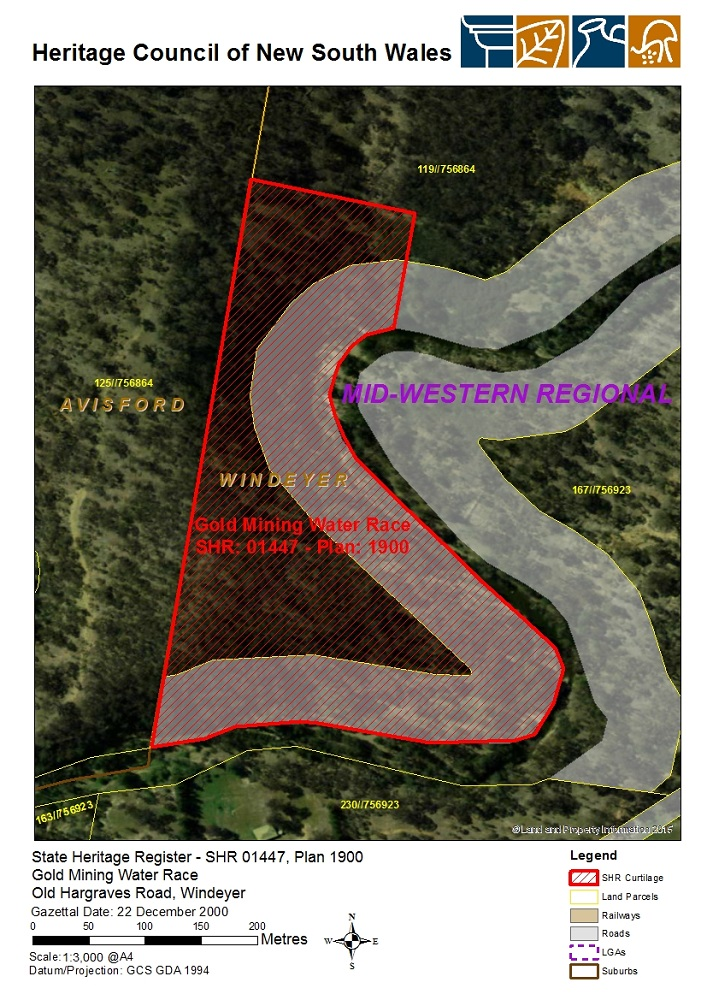
- Heritage boundaries

- Location within New South Wales Location within Australia
- 32.7773°S 149.5165°E
- Location: Old Hargraves Road, Windeyer, Mid-Western Regional Council, New South Wales, Australia

History
- Built: 1855–1865

New South Wales Heritage Register
- Official name: Gold Mining Water Race; Water Race; Chinese Wall
- Type: state heritage (archaeological-terrestrial)
- Designated: 22 December 2000
- Reference no.: 1447
- Type: Water Race
- Category: Mining and Mineral Processing

Gold Mining Water Race is a heritage-listed piece of mining infrastructure located on Old Hargraves Road at Windeyer, in the Central West region of New South Wales, Australia. It was built from 1855 to 1865 by Chinese miners, probably from Southern China. It was added to the New South Wales State Heritage Register on 22 December 2000.

== History ==
The Chinese built aqueduct wall is believed to have been built around the gold rush days of Windeyer district which started in the late 1850s. There was a considerable Chinese presence in the area reaching as many as 1200 at the peak of the gold rush. There were a number of gold strikes, and the strike nearest to this location was the strike at "Deep Crossing". Whether the Chinese were the first or only prospectors in this vicinity is not known, but they often reworked claims that had been already left by Europeans, and this may have been the case here.

The wall is believed to have been built by 12 Chinese men, supported by a cook.

The time it would have taken to build the wall implies these men were supported by wages or kept in supplies while on the project. They may have been contract workers.

== Description ==
This Chinese built aqueduct wall is built near the banks of, and following, the Meroo River. The nearest officially known gold settlement was Deep Crossing, which is on the next bend of the river down stream.

This dry stone wall follows the Meroo River water course for approximately 350 metres. The wall ranges in height from a few stones to 3.6 metres in height. A large portion of it being over 1.8 metres in height.

The wall is made of the shale rocks from the site, of flat rectangular shape and of various sizes, laid dry on their large sides. Rocks approximately 600mm x 600mm x 120mm deep are common.

There are long sections of the wall fully intact. After the first 50 metres travelling from the south small breaks occur about every 15 to 20 metres, with a large break, due to a landslip at approximately the 140 metre line. By 230 metres the wall begins to break up generally, and soon after the blackberry infestation generally makes it inaccessible.

At the top of the wall is a water race, which runs past the wall at each end, eventually travelling approximately 1 kilometre in total from its source, up-steam in the Meroo, to its finish at the end of Wall B.

The river flows towards the South, from above the dry stone wall (A), past a central section (B) and past another dry stone wall (C) The central section contains the continued water race dug into the hillside, numerous deep round hole diggings, remains of a possible dwelling and mounds of tailings.

Wall A faces the East, it is almost without biological growth. It looks quite a recent construction. Almost the whole of the top of the wall can be accessed except where the wall turns to face the south east, and the blackberry growth makes it difficult to continue.

Wall (C) however faces predominantly south and is covered in biological growth including mosses and considerable blackberry infestation. This makes the section (C) wall difficult to access from anywhere except the top, and makes it also hard to measure or record with photographs.

The wall was reported to be in fair to good physical condition as at 4 July 2000, with high archaeological potential.

This cast facing wall is remarkably intact. In parts the wall is in immaculate condition looking as if it were built in quite recent decades. Very tall sections show the great skill of the masons. Weed and other plant growth on its face is minimal for about 90% of its length, making it almost all accessible.

There are also considerable additional constructions associated with this site, in the central section, the second wall, across the River and the upper reaches of the race where the water was dammed and redirected from the river.

Comparison with other Chinese built walls, and of other water race constructions, in Australia and overseas, would be valuable.

== Heritage listing ==
This site shows significant evidence of Chinese presence in Australia, especially as this wall appears to be wholly attributed to the Chinese. The wall which was built to support a water race for alluvial gold mining in the valley of the Meroo River, is exceptional in its scale, being higher than most similar constructions having been built in very difficult terrain. It was built with only primitive implements, using a wooden bow and plumb bob to accurately provide minimum fails to the water course over a long distance. The wall is in excellent condition, a testimony to the considerable masonry skills of the Chinese builders.

Gold Mining Water Race was listed on the New South Wales State Heritage Register on 22 December 2000 having satisfied the following criteria.

The place is important in demonstrating the course, or pattern, of cultural or natural history in New South Wales.

Gold was discovered in the district of Windeyer around 1850, and by 1858 there was a considerable Chinese presence in the district. This wall was built between 145 and 130 years ago by Chinese gold miners. They were part of the general Gold Rush phase of Australia.

The place is important in demonstrating aesthetic characteristics and/or a high degree of creative or technical achievement in New South Wales.

The wall displays excellent masonry skills. A remarkably long and high wall the area of the face is approx 400sm. It is a dramatic feature in the landscape, yet it blends beautifully with the winding river, and rocky hillside. The wall has remained largely "undiscovered" probably due to its remoteness and the way it blends with the landscape. It is also not marked on the local topographical maps while most other "diggings" are.

The place has a strong or special association with a particular community or cultural group in New South Wales for social, cultural or spiritual reasons.

A remnant of the Chinese presence in Australia during the gold rush period. It is important in that this wall is attributed solely to the Chinese workers. As the project was obviously a shared venture, over a long period of time, the social significance of the brotherhood and friendship of these 12 Chinese expatriates, and their achievement together with minimal materials and primitive tools is most impressive.

The place has potential to yield information that will contribute to an understanding of the cultural or natural history of New South Wales.

The Chinese designers used their considerable ingenuity and skill to collect water from the upper reaches of the Meroo River, where the stream drops quite rapidly. Using a small dam construction to collect the water initially, then a water race. The water was carded thus until the terrain became difficult, steep and rocky. Here the Chinese constructed a shale stone wall to support the race, and so carried the water around the bend in the river.

The tool that was used to measure the level of the water course, and so to carry the water a long distance with a minimal drop, was a wooden bow and plumb bob. Taking the water at this higher level to the area of diggings and sluicing, allowed the workers then to process much more pay-dirt than the more typical method of digging it out and carrying it to the water.

The place possesses uncommon, rare or endangered aspects of the cultural or natural history of New South Wales.

Wall constructions of this scale (height & length) are rare. This was principally due to the circumstances of the landscape: the steep sides of the hill, the available shale rocks, and the rich gold find that made it feasible.

The place is important in demonstrating the principal characteristics of a class of cultural or natural places/environments in New South Wales.

There are similar, but less imposing walls in other Gold Mining sites. For example in the Palmer River Catchment area (see Eric Rolls' book The Sojouners p. 214, and the Stoney Creek aqueduct (p. 215), 1300M long and an average 1M high. The use of an aqueduct was a common practice in many gold fields.
