= Maitland Bar =

Maitland Bar New South Wales
- Coordinates: 32°44′46″S 149°26′02″E
- Population: 18 (2016 census)
- Postcode(s): 2850
- Location: 303 km (188 mi) NW of Sydney; 170 km (106 mi) NE of Orange; 38 km (24 mi) SW of Mudgee
- LGA(s): Mid-Western Regional Council
- State electorate(s): Electoral district of Dubbo
- Federal division(s): Calare

Maitland Bar is a remote locality in New South Wales, Australia. It is on the banks of the Meroo River, just north of the gold rush town, Hargraves, New South Wales. In the 2016 census, it had a population of 18
