= Phillip County =

Phillip New South Wales
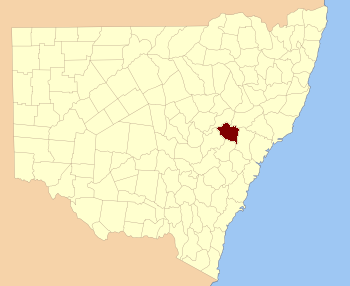
- Location in New South Wales
Lands administrative divisions around Phillip:
Bligh	Brisbane	Brisbane
Wellington	Phillip	Hunter
Wellington	Roxburgh	Hunter

Phillip County was one of the original Nineteen Counties in New South Wales and is now one of the 141 cadastral divisions of New South Wales. It includes the area to the east of Mudgee and Gulgong. The Cudgegong River is the border to the south-west, and the Goulburn River the border to the north.

Phillip County was named in honour of Governor of New South Wales, Admiral Arthur Phillip. The Electoral district of Phillip, Brisbane and Bligh was the first electoral district for the area, between 1856 and 1859.

== Parishes within this county ==
A full list of parishes found within this county; their current LGA and mapping coordinates to the approximate centre of each location is as follows:

Parish	LGA	Coordinates
Arthur	Mid-Western Regional Council	32°40′54″S 149°48′04″E
Bara	Mid-Western Regional Council	32°35′54″S 149°49′04″E
Barigan	Mid-Western Regional Council	32°28′54″S 150°00′04″E
Bayly	Mid-Western Regional Council	32°28′54″S 149°44′04″E
Boogledie	Mid-Western Regional Council	32°32′54″S 149°43′04″E
Botobolar	Mid-Western Regional Council	32°29′54″S 149°47′34″E
Budden	Mid-Western Regional Council	32°26′54″S 150°05′04″E
Bumberra	Mid-Western Regional Council	32°33′54″S 149°38′04″E
Burrumbelong	Mid-Western Regional Council	32°26′54″S 150°03′04″E
Bylong	Mid-Western Regional Council	32°31′54″S 150°12′04″E
Coggan	Mid-Western Regional Council	32°23′54″S 150°03′04″E
Comiala	Mid-Western Regional Council	32°12′54″S 150°03′04″E
Coolcalwin	Mid-Western Regional Council	32°46′54″S 150°08′04″E
Cooyal	Mid-Western Regional Council	32°25′54″S 149°44′04″E
Cumbo	Mid-Western Regional Council	32°22′54″S 149°53′04″E
Dabee	Mid-Western Regional Council	32°45′54″S 150°00′04″E
Derale	Mid-Western Regional Council	32°36′54″S 149°44′04″E
Dungeree	Mid-Western Regional Council	32°41′54″S 149°53′04″E
Eurundury	Mid-Western Regional Council	32°28′54″S 149°39′04″E
Fitzgerald	Mid-Western Regional Council	32°26′54″S 150°01′04″E
Galambine	Mid-Western Regional Council	32°26′54″S 149°29′04″E
Growee	Mid-Western Regional Council	32°35′54″S 150°03′04″E
Gulgong	Mid-Western Regional Council	32°22′54″S 149°34′04″E
Guntawang	Mid-Western Regional Council	32°21′54″S 149°29′04″E
Hawkins	Mid-Western Regional Council	32°37′54″S 149°54′04″E
Kelgoola	Mid-Western Regional Council	32°51′54″S 150°15′04″E
Kerrabee	Muswellbrook Shire	32°26′54″S 150°18′04″E
Lee	Mid-Western Regional Council	32°27′54″S 150°08′04″E
Lennox	Mid-Western Regional Council	32°14′54″S 149°51′04″E
Louee	Mid-Western Regional Council	32°40′54″S 149°56′04″E
Mcdonald	Muswellbrook Shire	32°26′54″S 150°22′04″E
Mcdonald	Muswellbrook Shire	32°32′54″S 150°16′04″E
Moolarben	Mid-Western Regional Council	32°21′54″S 149°45′04″E
Murrumbo	Mid-Western Regional Council	32°20′54″S 150°15′04″E
Never Never	Mid-Western Regional Council	32°46′54″S 150°14′04″E
Nullo	Mid-Western Regional Council	32°35′54″S 150°10′04″E
Pomany	Mid-Western Regional Council	32°44′54″S 150°18′04″E
Price	Mid-Western Regional Council	32°27′54″S 149°50′04″E
Rumker	Mid-Western Regional Council	32°41′54″S 150°02′04″E
Simpson	Muswellbrook Shire	32°34′54″S 150°18′04″E
Tongbong	Mid-Western Regional Council	32°43′54″S 149°56′04″E
Wialdra	Mid-Western Regional Council	32°21′54″S 149°39′04″E
Widden	Muswellbrook Shire	32°35′54″S 150°21′04″E
Wilbertree	Mid-Western Regional Council	32°27′54″S 149°35′04″E
Wilpinjong	Mid-Western Regional Council	32°18′54″S 149°50′04″E
Wollar	Mid-Western Regional Council	32°20′54″S 149°58′04″E
