= Roxburgh County =

Roxburgh New South Wales
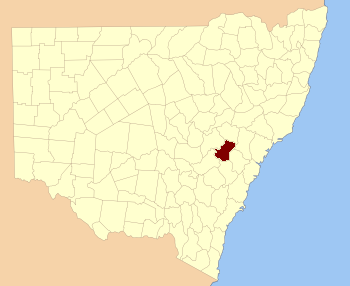
- Location in New South Wales
Lands administrative divisions around Roxburgh:
Wellington	Phillip	Hunter
Wellington	Roxburgh	Cook
Bathurst	Westmoreland	Westmoreland

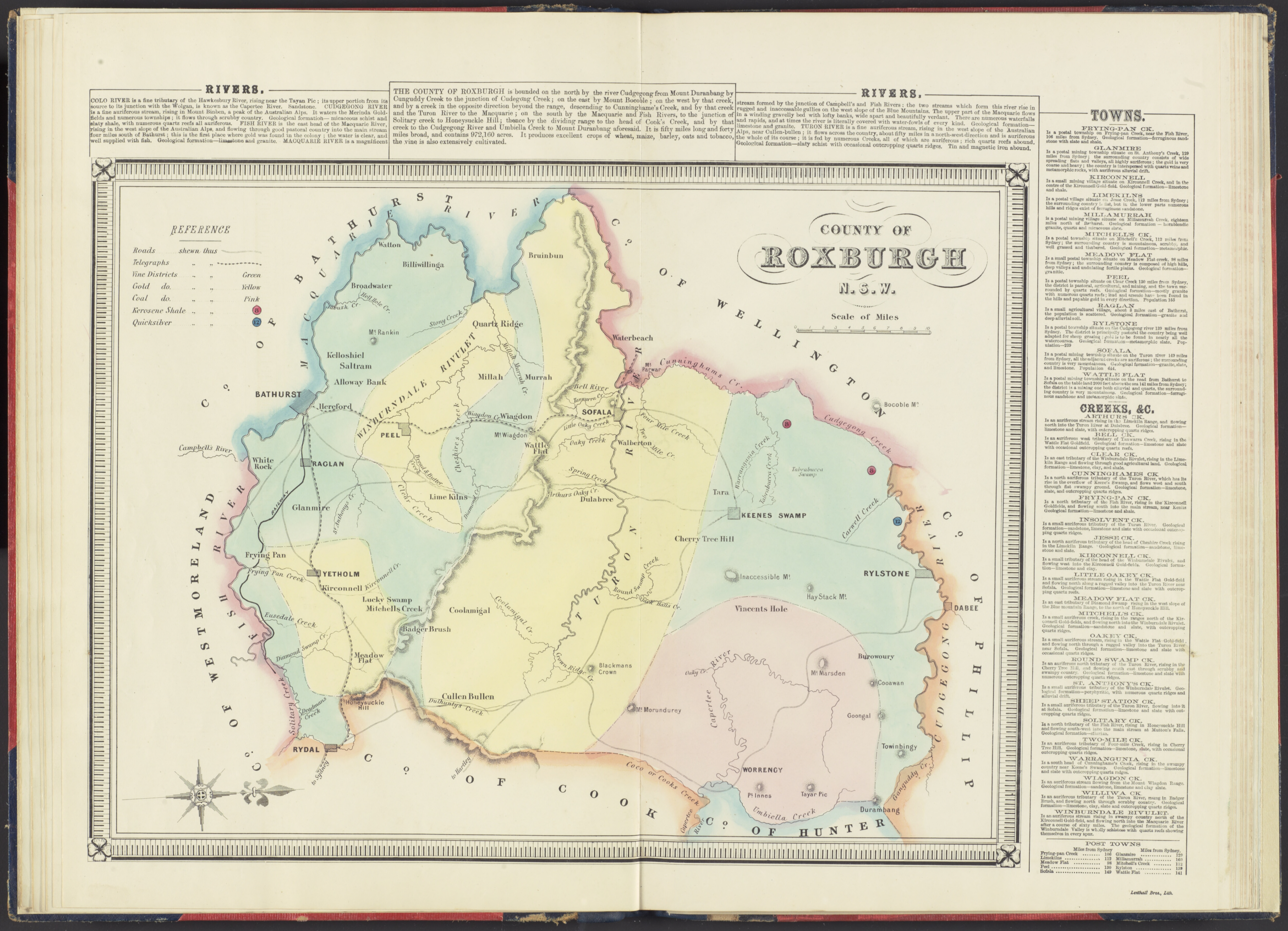
1872 map of Roxburgh County

Roxburgh County was one of the original Nineteen Counties in New South Wales and is now one of the 141 cadastral divisions of New South Wales. It includes the area to the north east of Bathurst, lying to the north and east of the Fish River to the junction of the Turon River. It includes Sofala. The Gudgegong River is the border to the north.

Roxburgh County named after the Scottish county of the same name. It was named in 1829.

== Parishes within this county ==
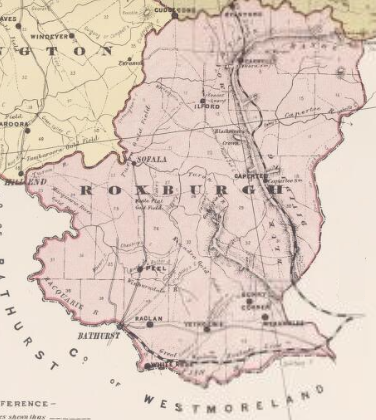
Roxburgh_Map_(NSW)_from_John_Sands_Atlas_of_Australiasia1886

A full list of parishes found within this county; their current LGA and mapping coordinates to the approximate centre of each location is as follows:

Parish	LGA	Coordinates
Airly	City of Lithgow	33°04′54″S 150°00′04″E
Bandamora	City of Lithgow	33°08′54″S 150°00′04″E
Ben Bullen	City of Lithgow	33°14′54″S 150°00′04″E
Bocoble	Mid-Western Regional Council	32°50′54″S 149°48′04″E
Bruinbun	Bathurst Regional Council	33°05′54″S 149°26′04″E
Burrowoury	Mid-Western Regional Council	32°50′54″S 150°06′04″E
Capertee	City of Lithgow	32°59′54″S 150°06′04″E
Castleton	Bathurst Regional Council	33°20′54″S 149°51′04″E
Clandulla	City of Lithgow	32°57′54″S 150°00′04″E
Coco	City of Lithgow	33°09′54″S 150°02′04″E
Coolamigal	City of Lithgow	33°18′54″S 149°55′04″E
Crudine	Mid-Western Regional Council	32°59′54″S 149°41′04″E
Cullen Bullen	City of Lithgow	33°17′54″S 149°59′04″E
Dulabree	City of Lithgow	33°09′54″S 149°49′04″E
Duramana	Bathurst Regional Council	33°15′54″S 149°34′04″E
Eskdale	Bathurst Regional Council	33°20′54″S 149°44′04″E
Eusdale	Bathurst Regional Council	33°27′54″S 149°52′04″E
Falnash	City of Lithgow	33°22′54″S 149°57′04″E
Ganguddy	Mid-Western Regional Council	32°51′54″S 150°12′04″E
Goongal	City of Lithgow	32°54′54″S 150°06′04″E
Hearne	Mid-Western Regional Council	33°01′54″S 149°54′04″E
Jedburgh	Bathurst Regional Council	33°20′54″S 149°33′04″E
Jesse	Bathurst Regional Council	33°15′54″S 149°44′04″E
Kelso	Bathurst Regional Council	33°26′54″S 149°37′04″E
Macquarie	Bathurst Regional Council	33°07′54″S 149°30′04″E
Mead	Mid-Western Regional Council	32°55′54″S 149°54′04″E
Melrose	Bathurst Regional Council	33°26′54″S 149°43′04″E
Millah Murrah	Bathurst Regional Council	33°10′54″S 149°36′04″E
Morundurey	City of Lithgow	33°04′54″S 150°07′04″E
Peel	Bathurst Regional Council	33°20′54″S 149°39′04″E
Piper	Bathurst Regional Council	33°15′54″S 149°27′04″E
Rylstone	Mid-Western Regional Council	32°50′54″S 150°00′04″E
Sofala	Bathurst Regional Council	33°06′54″S 149°44′04″E
Stewart	Mid-Western Regional Council	33°04′54″S 149°52′04″E
Tabrabucca	Mid-Western Regional Council	32°54′54″S 149°48′04″E
Tayar	City of Lithgow	32°55′54″S 150°13′04″E
Thornshope	City of Lithgow	33°29′54″S 149°58′04″E
Turon	City of Lithgow	33°16′54″S 149°50′04″E
Umbiella	City of Lithgow	32°59′54″S 150°13′04″E
Walberton	Mid-Western Regional Council	33°01′54″S 149°46′04″E
Waltham	Bathurst Regional Council	33°16′54″S 149°31′04″E
Warrangunia	Mid-Western Regional Council	32°59′54″S 149°50′04″E
Waterbeach	Bathurst Regional Council	33°04′54″S 149°35′04″E
Watton	Bathurst Regional Council	33°19′54″S 149°27′04″E
Wells	Mid-Western Regional Council	32°49′54″S 149°54′04″E
Wiagdon	Bathurst Regional Council	33°14′54″S 149°41′04″E
Winburn	Bathurst Regional Council	33°16′54″S 149°39′04″E
Yetholme	Bathurst Regional Council	33°28′54″S 149°47′04″E
