= Windamere Dam =

- Location of the Windamere Dam in New South Wales
- Country: Australia
- Location: Central Tablelands, New South Wales
- Coordinates: 32°43′40″S 149°46′25″E
- Purpose: Hydro-power, irrigation, water supply, and conservation
- Status: Operational
- Construction began: 1974
- Opening date: 1984
- Owner: State Water Corporation

Dam and spillways
- Type of dam: Embankment dam
- Impounds: Cudgegong River
- Height: 67 m (220 ft)
- Length: 825 m (2,707 ft)
- Dam volume: 1,740 m^{3} (61,000 cu ft)
- Spillways: 1
- Spillway type: Uncontrolled unlined rock cutting
- Spillway capacity: 6,270 m^{3}/s (221,000 cu ft/s)

Reservoir
- Creates: Lake Windamere
- Total capacity: 368,120 ML (13,000×10^{6} cu ft)
- Catchment area: 1,070 km^{2} (410 sq mi)
- Surface area: 2,030 ha (5,000 acres)
- Maximum water depth: 58 m (190 ft)
- Normal elevation: 552 m (1,811 ft) AHD

Power Station
- Type: Conventional
- Installed capacity: 2 MW (2,700 hp)
- Website; Windamere Dam at www.statewater.com.au

Windamere Dam is a minor ungated rock fill with clay core embankment dam with an uncontrolled unlined rock cutting spillway across the Cudgegong River at Cudgegong, upstream of Mudgee in the Central Tablelands of New South Wales, Australia. The dam's purpose includes hydro-power, irrigation, water supply, and conservation. The impounded reservoir is called Lake Windamere.

== Location and features ==
Commenced in 1974 and completed in 1984, the Windamere Dam is a minor ungated dam, located approximately 19 kilometres (12 mi) south-west of Rylstone. The dam was built by Abignano Pty Ltd on behalf of the New South Wales Department of Land and Water Conservation to supply water for irrigation and potable water for the towns of Mudgee and Gulgong. Windamere Dam operates in conjunction with Burrendong Dam to supply water to the Cudgegong and Macquarie valleys.

The dam wall constructed with 1,740 cubic metres (61,000 cu ft) of rock fill with clay core is 67 metres (220 ft) high and 825 metres (2,707 ft) long. The maximum water depth is 58 metres (190 ft) and at 100% capacity the dam wall holds back 368,120 megalitres (13,000×10^{6} cu ft) of water at 552 metres (1,811 ft) AHD. The surface area of Lake Windamere is 2,030 hectares (5,000 acres) and the catchment area is 1,070 square kilometres (410 sq mi). The uncontrolled unlined rock cut spillway is capable of discharging 6,270 cubic metres per second (221,000 cu ft/s).

Geotechnical problems included excessive grout takes in highly fractured rock in the dam foundation. The dam foundations are weathered Devonian conglomerates, sandstones and shales. The spillway is located about 1 kilometre (0.62 mi) away from the dam wall in mostly unweathered Ordovician andesite. The spillway is an unlined rock cutting that provided all the rock fill required for the construction of the dam embankment. If a spillway had been built in the weathered sedimentary rocks at the dam site full concrete lining would have been required.

To allow the dam's construction, a 15 kilometre deviation of the Castlereagh Highway opened in December 1982.

=== Power generation ===
A hydro-electric power station generates up to 2 megawatts (2,700 hp) of electricity from the flow of the water leaving Windamere Dam.

== See also ==
- Irrigation in Australia
- List of dams and reservoirs in New South Wales
