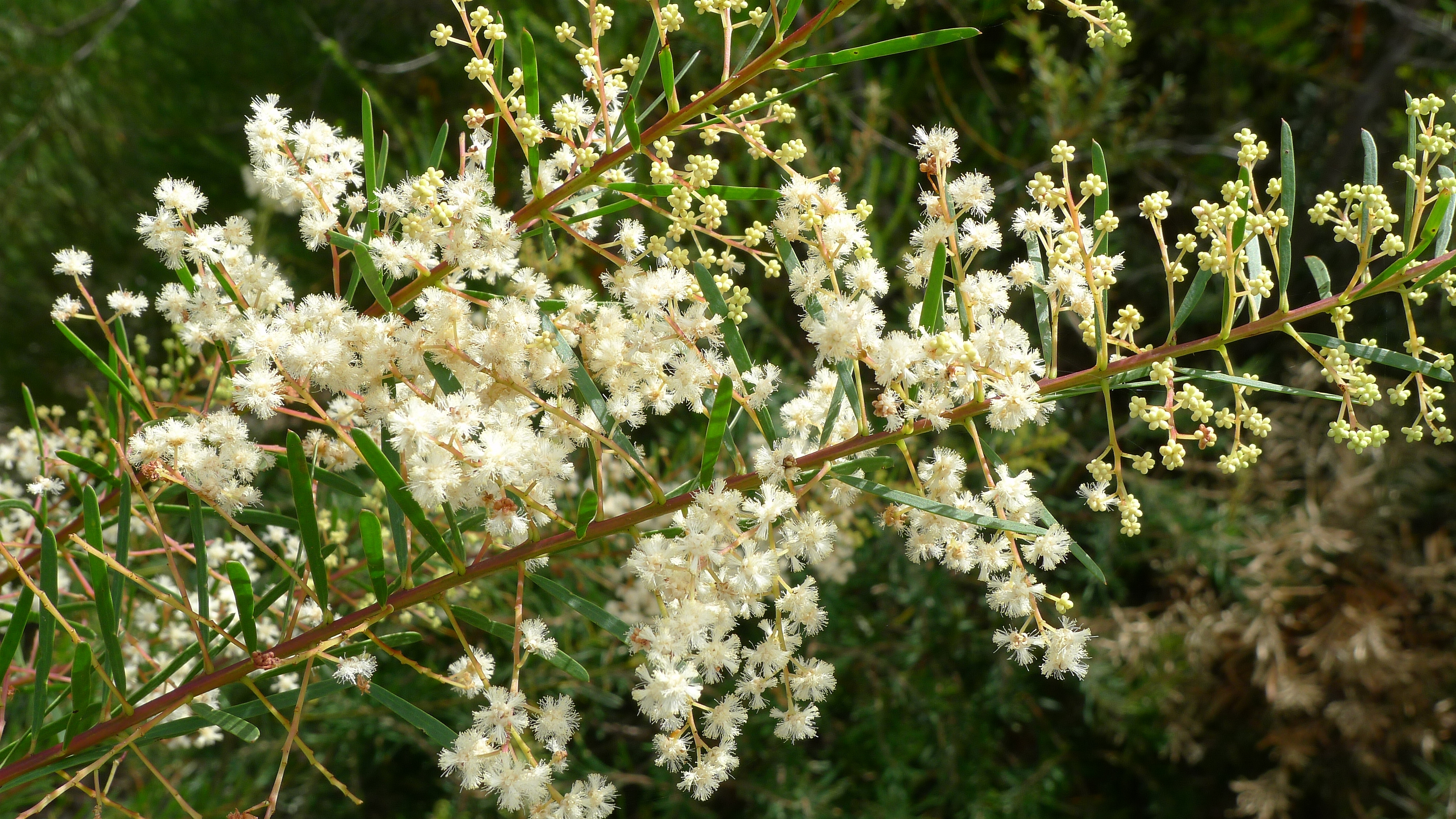

Scientific classification
- Kingdom: Plantae
- Clade: Tracheophytes
- Clade: Angiosperms
- Clade: Eudicots
- Clade: Rosids
- Order: Fabales
- Family: Fabaceae
- Subfamily: Caesalpinioideae
- Clade: Mimosoid clade
- Genus: Acacia
- Species: A. linifolia

Binomial name
- Acacia linifolia (Vent.) Willd.

Synonyms
- List: Acacia abietina Willd.; Acacia linearis (J.C.Wendl.) Hochr. nom. illeg.; Acacia linearis (J.C.Wendl.) J.F.Macbr. nom. illeg.; Acacia linifolia (Vent.) Willd. var. linifolia; Mimosa abietina (Willd.) Poir.; Mimosa linearis J.C.Wendl.; Mimosa linifolia Vent.; Phyllodoce linifolia (Vent.) Link; Racosperma linifolium (Vent.) Pedley

= Acacia linifolia =

Species of legume

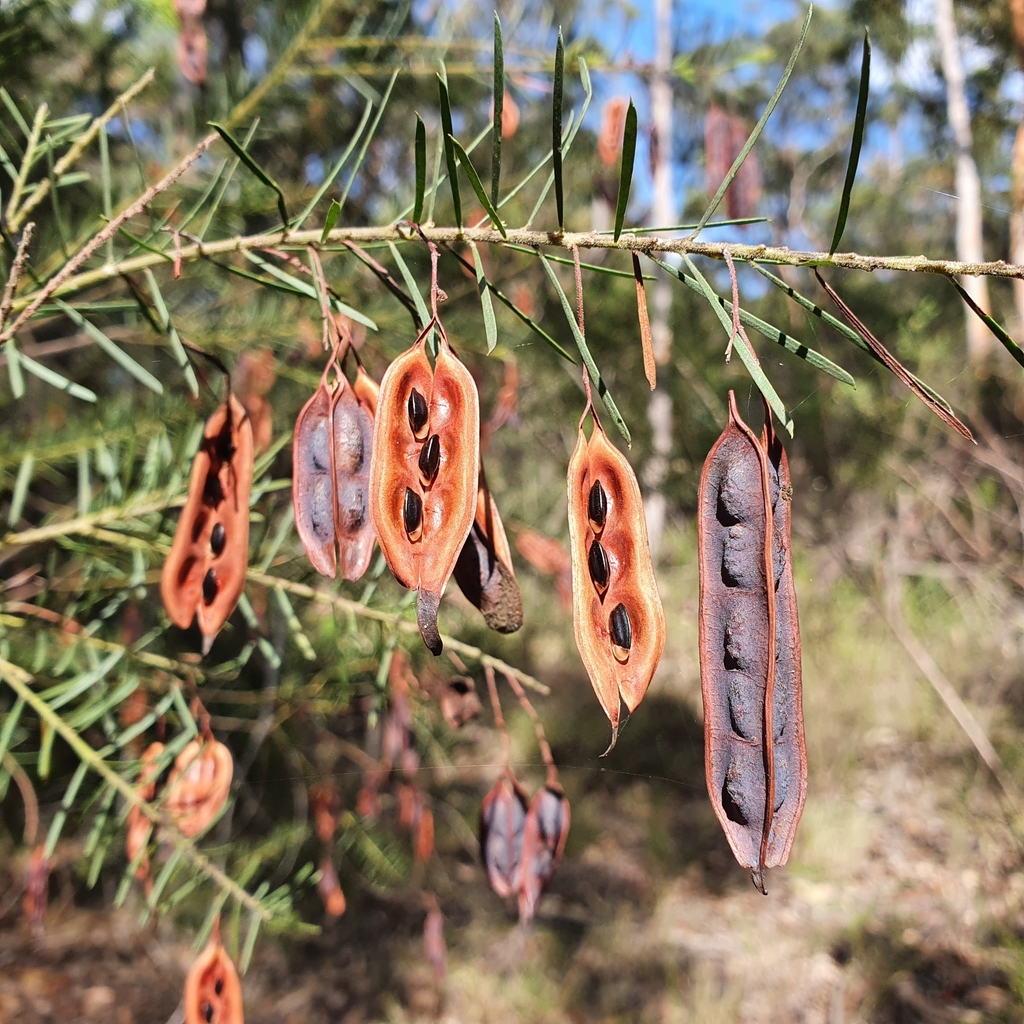
Pods at Picnic Point

Acacia linifolia, commonly known as white wattle, or flax-leaved wattle, is a species of flowering plant in the family Fabaceae and is endemic to New South Wales, Australia. It is an erect or spreading shrub with smooth or finely fissured bark, arching branches, more or less spreading linear, mostly glabrous phyllodes, spherical heads of creamy white to pale yellow flowers, and firmly papery to thinly leathery pods.

== Description ==
Acacia linifolia is an erect or spreading shrub that typically grows to a height of 1.5–4 m (4 ft 11 in – 13 ft 1 in) and has smooth or finely fissured grey bark and arching branches and usually glabrous, finely ridged branchlets. Its phyllodes are rather crowded, more or less spreading, erect, linear, 20–50 mm (0.79–1.97 in) long, 0.7–2.5 mm (0.028–0.098 in) wide and flat. The flowers are borne in racemes 20–50 mm (0.79–1.97 in) long of spherical heads on peduncles 2–5 mm (0.079–0.197 in) long, each head with six to twelve creamy white to pale yellow flowers. Flowering occurs throughout the year and the pods are stalked, straight or curved, firmly papery to thinly leathery, up to 150 mm (5.9 in) long, 7–15 mm (0.28–0.59 in) wide, and dark purplish brown to black. The seeds are oblong to egg-shaped, about 5 mm (0.20 in) long and dull black, with a somewhat club-shaped aril.

== Taxonomy ==
In 1800, Étienne Pierre Ventenat first formally described this taxon as Mimosa linearis in his Botanische Beobachtungen: nebst einigen neuen Gattungen und Arten. In 1806, Carl Ludwig Willdenow transferred the species to Acacia as A. linifolia in Species Plantarum. The specific epithet (linifolia) refers to the shape of the phyllodes that are similar to the leaves of flax plants. This species is similar to Acacia boormanii and Acacia meiantha which have bright yellow flower heads.

== Distribution and habitat ==
White wattle is found in eastern New South Wales from around the Hunter Valley in the north to near Hill Top and Narooma, and is quite common around Sydney. It is usually found in dry sclerophyll forest, heathland or open woodland where it grows in skeletal sandy soils over or around sandstone, or in clay soils over or around shale.

== Traditional use ==
Acacia linifolia is featured in the dreaming stories Doo’ragai Diday Boo’kerrikin (The Sisters Boo’kerrikin) and Bundalook (How the Birds got their Colours) of the D'harawal people.

The wood was used for the making of implements and weapons. The leaves and young twigs were bruised then thrown into water holes or slowly moving streams to stun fish.

— Aunty Fran Bodkin

== See also ==
- List of Acacia species
