= Totnes Valley =

Totnes Valley New South Wales
- Coordinates: 32°29′55″S 149°54′27″E
- Population: 33 (2016 census)
- Postcode(s): 2850
- Location: 308 km (191 mi) NW of Sydney; 151 km (94 mi) E of Dubbo; 42 km (26 mi) NE of Mudgee
- LGA(s): Mid-Western Regional Council
- State electorate(s): Electoral district of Dubbo
- Federal division(s): Calare

Totnes Valley is a locality in New South Wales, Australia. It is located 42 kilometres north-east of Mudgee. In the 2016 census, it had a population of 33 people.
