= Bombira =

Bombira New South Wales
- Coordinates: 32°34′28″S 149°36′14″E
- Population: 348 (2016 census)
- Postcode(s): 2850
- Location: 268 km (167 mi) NW of Sydney; 186 km (116 mi) NE of Orange; 3.1 km (2 mi) NE of Mudgee
- LGA(s): Mid-Western Regional Council
- State electorate(s): Dubbo
- Federal division(s): Calare

Bombira is a locality in New South Wales, Australia. It is located about 3.1 kilometres (1.9 mi) north of Mudgee, on the Cudgegong River. In the 2016 census, it recorded a population of 348 people.
