= Meroo =

Meroo may refer to:

- Meroo National Park, New South Wales, Australia
- Meroo River, New South Wales, Australia
- Meroo, Leh, a village in India
