= Wyaldra Creek =

Coordinates: 32.3667°S 149.533°E

Location
- Countries: Australia

Wyaldra Creek is a creek in the Gulgong district of New South Wales, Australia.

Wyaldra Creek is about 20 km long. It rises in the hills near Tallawang, about 15 kilometres north of Gulgong. It flows south and then west and joins the Cudgegong River, about 8 kilometres west of Gulgong. The Wyaldra creek drainage basin is generally the most northeasterly component of the Cudgegong river watershed. Tributaries of the creek extend from the Great Dividing Range drainage basin divide around Ulan, although the drainage divide is topographically almost insignificant in this area.

The Castlereagh Highway crosses Wyaldra Creek about 5 kilometres northwest of Gulgong. There is also a historic timber bridge at the hamlet of Beryl another 4 kilometres further west.

Most of the former Wyaldra Shire was located in the area of Wyaldra Creek, due to local government amalgamations it is now part of the Mid-Western Regional Council based at Mudgee.
