= Westmoreland County, New South Wales =

Westmoreland
- Cadastral division
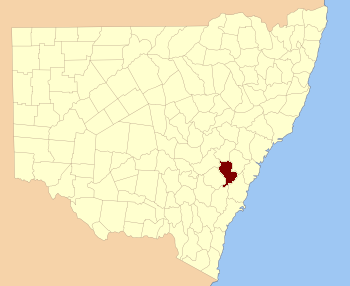
- Location in New South Wales
- Country: Australia
- State: New South Wales
Lands administrative divisions around Westmoreland
Bathurst	Roxburgh	Cook
Georgiana	Westmoreland	Cook
Argyle	Argyle	Camden

Westmoreland County was one of the original Nineteen Counties in New South Wales and is now one of the 141 cadastral divisions of New South Wales. It is to the west of Sydney in the Blue Mountains. Coxs River is the border to the north, and the Wollondilly River to the east. Campbells River is the border in the north-east, where the county extends to near Bathurst, with the Fish River part of the border. It includes the town of Oberon, and the Kanangra-Boyd National Park.

Westmoreland County is named in honour of John Fane, Tenth Earl of Westmorland (1759–1841). The Electoral district of Cook and Westmoreland was the first state electoral district for the area, between 1856 and 1859. The extra "e" in Westmoreland is a play on "west more land", referring to the extra farming opportunities this newly discovered country provided for settlers at the time.

== Parishes within this county ==
A full list of parishes found within this county; their current LGA and mapping coordinates to the approximate centre of each location is as follows:

Parish	LGA	Coordinates
Abercorn	Oberon Council	33°59′54″S 149°55′04″E
Adderley	Oberon Council	33°44′54″S 149°41′04″E
Antonio	City of Lithgow	30°35′54″S 149°58′04″E
Balfour	Oberon Council	33°47′54″S 149°45′04″E
Banshea	Oberon Council	34°02′54″S 150°02′04″E
Baring	Oberon Council	33°42′54″S 149°43′04″E
Bimlow	Wollondilly Shire	33°58′54″S 150°23′04″E
Bindo	City of Lithgow	33°40′54″S 150°02′04″E
Blenheim	Oberon Council	33°36′54″S 149°54′04″E
Bolton	Oberon Council	33°33′54″S 149°46′04″E
Bouverie	Upper Lachlan Shire	34°19′54″S 149°54′04″E
Bulgarres	Oberon Council	33°51′54″S 149°57′04″E
Colong	Wollondilly Shire	34°07′54″S 150°09′04″E
Crete	Oberon Council	33°44′54″S 149°45′04″E
Cyclops	Wollondilly Shire	33°54′54″S 150°14′04″E
Drogheda	Oberon Council	33°55′54″S 149°56′04″E
Duckmaloi	Oberon Council	33°46′54″S 149°57′04″E
Ganbenang	City of Lithgow	33°40′54″S 150°07′04″E
Gangerang	Oberon Council	33°59′54″S 150°10′04″E
Guineacor	Wingecarribee Shire	34°18′54″S 150°00′04″E
Irene	Oberon Council	33°44′54″S 149°36′04″E
Jenolan	Oberon Council	33°47′54″S 150°05′04″E
Jocelyn	Oberon Council	33°35′54″S 149°46′04″E
Jooriland	Wollondilly Shire	34°11′54″S 150°15′04″E
Kendale	Oberon Council	33°32′54″S 149°51′04″E
Konangaroo	Oberon Council	33°51′54″S 150°03′04″E
Kowmung	Oberon Council	33°57′54″S 149°52′04″E
Langdale	Oberon Council	33°30′54″S 149°39′04″E
Leibnitz	Wollondilly Shire	34°12′54″S 150°08′04″E
Lowther	City of Lithgow	33°35′54″S 150°06′04″E
Merlin	Wollondilly Shire	34°01′54″S 150°14′04″E
Mozart	Oberon Council	33°47′54″S 149°51′04″E
Murruin	Shire	34°07′54″S 150°02′04″E
Norway	Oberon Council	33°44′54″S 149°52′04″E
Oberon	Oberon Council	33°36′54″S 149°49′04″E
Oldbuck	Shire	34°13′54″S 150°03′04″E
Speedwell	Wollondilly Shire	33°55′54″S 150°17′04″E
St Columba	Shire	34°11′54″S 150°00′04″E
Swatchfield	Oberon Council	33°51′54″S 149°43′04″E
Tartarus	Oberon Council	34°03′54″S 150°06′04″E
Terni	Wollondilly Shire	34°02′54″S 150°18′04″E
The Peaks	Wollondilly Shire	34°06′54″S 150°15′04″E
Thornshope	City of Lithgow	33°32′54″S 149°59′04″E
Thurat	Oberon Council	33°56′54″S 150°04′04″E
Vulcan	Oberon Council	33°52′54″S 149°47′04″E
Wingecarribee	Wollondilly Shire	34°03′54″S 150°22′04″E
