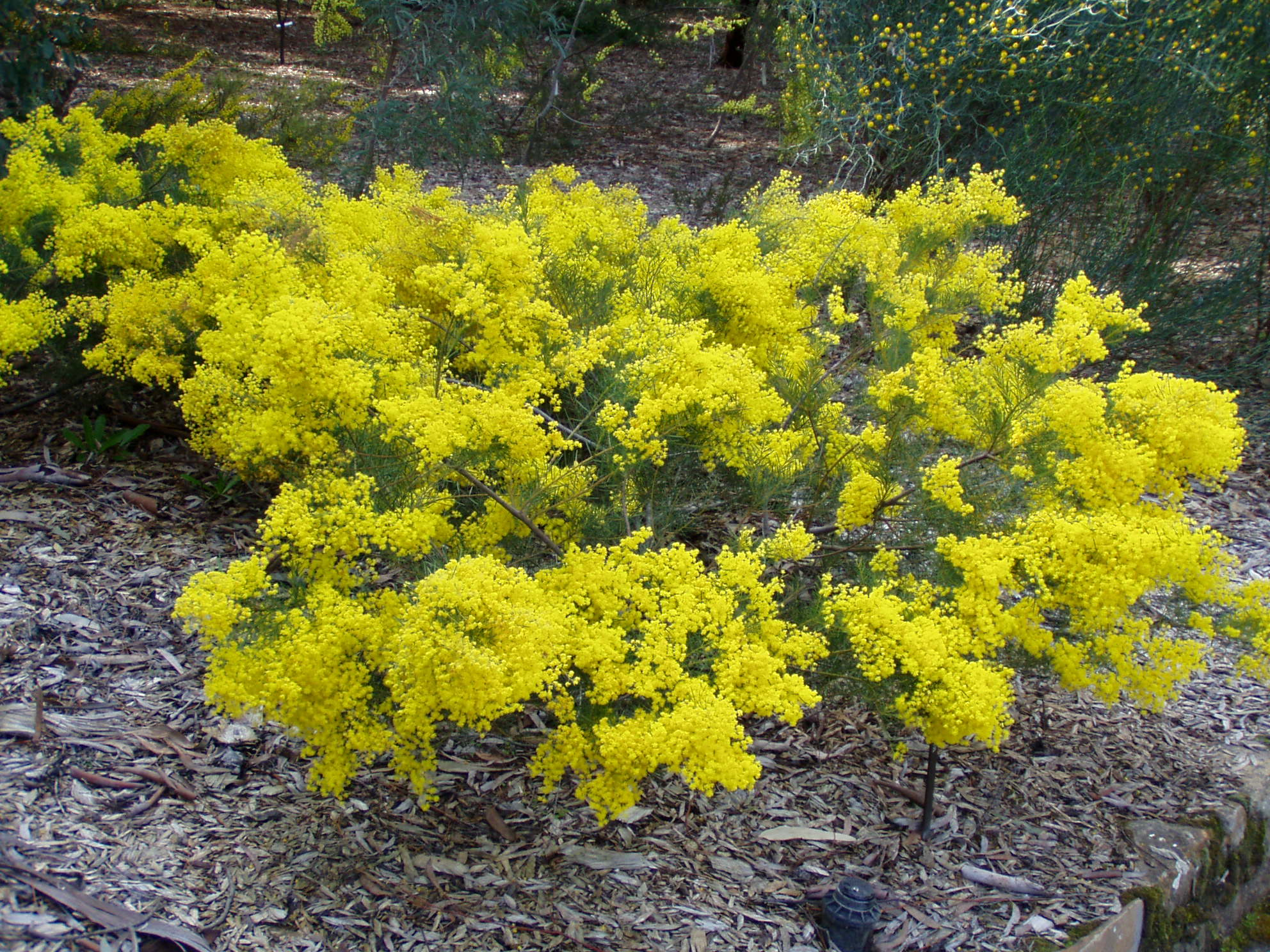
- In the Australian National Botanic Gardens

Conservation status
- Endangered (EPBC Act)

Scientific classification
- Kingdom: Plantae
- Clade: Tracheophytes
- Clade: Angiosperms
- Clade: Eudicots
- Clade: Rosids
- Order: Fabales
- Family: Fabaceae
- Subfamily: Caesalpinioideae
- Clade: Mimosoid clade
- Genus: Acacia
- Species: A. meiantha

Binomial name
- Acacia meiantha Tindale & Hersc.
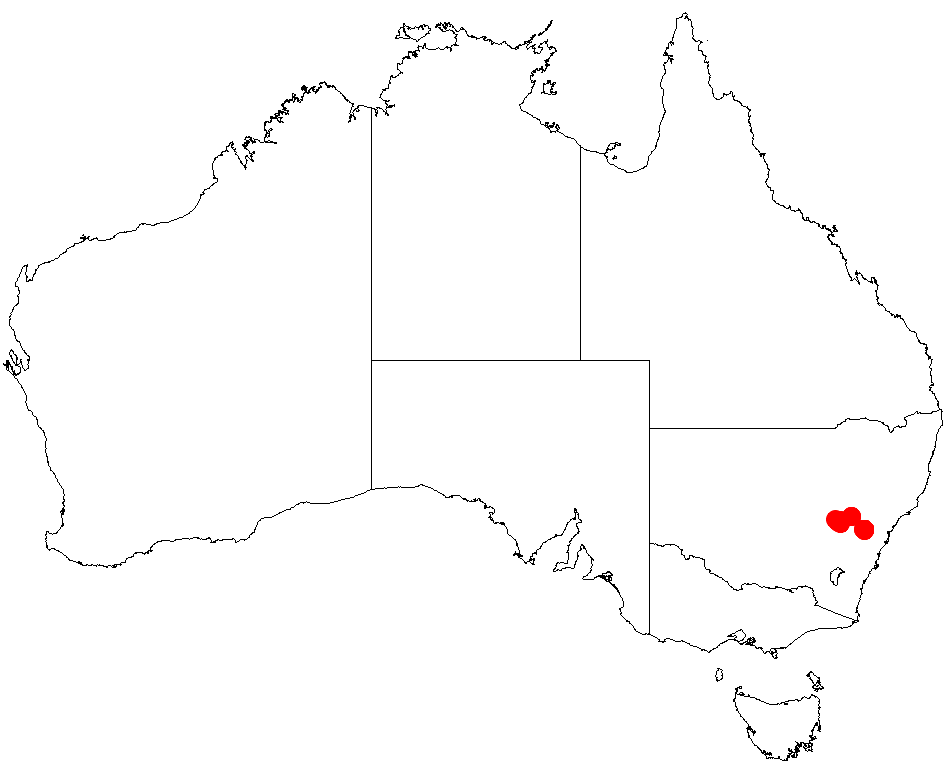
- Occurrence data from AVH

Synonyms
- Racosperma meianthum (Tindale & Hersc.) Pedley

= Acacia meiantha =

Species of legume

Acacia meiantha, commonly known as barradam-bang wattle, is a species of flowering plant in the family Fabaceae and is endemic to a restricted part of New South Wales, Australia. It is an erect, spreading or straggling shrub with smooth bark, angled, hairy branchlets, crowded linear phyllodes, spherical heads of yellow flowers, and narrowly oblong, firmly papery pods.

== Description ==
Acacia meiantha is an erect, spreading or straggling, multi-stemmed shrub that typically grows to a height of up to 2 m (6 ft 7 in), often with root suckers, and has smooth brown to grey bark. Its branchlets are angled near the end and covered with short, stiff hairs up to 0.2 mm (0.0079 in) long. Bipinnate leaves are sometimes present. The phyllodes are crowded, linear, straight to slightly curved, subterete to more or less flattened, mostly 20–50 mm (0.79–1.97 in) long, 0.4–1.2 mm (0.016–0.047 in) wide, glabrous or almost so with a gland 0.5–7 mm (0.020–0.276 in) above the pulvinus. The flowers are borne in 2 to 19 spherical heads on peduncles 2–4.5 mm (0.079–0.177 in) long, in a raceme 15–30 mm (0.59–1.18 in) long. Each head has four to six yellow to dark yellow flowers. Flowering occurs from July to October, and the pods are narrowly oblong and flat, up to 85 mm (3.3 in) long, 4–7 mm (0.16–0.28 in) wide, light brown, smooth, scarcely constricted between the seeds, and firmly papery .

== Taxonomy ==
Acacia meiantha was first formally described in 1992 by Mary Tindale and Josephine Herscovitch in the journal Australian Systematic Botany from specimens collected on Mullions Range, 4.8 or 6.4 km (3.0 or 4.0 mi) north of Mullion Creek in 1959. The specific epithet (meiantha) means 'smaller' or 'less flowers', referring to the numbers of flowers in each head.

== Distribution and habitat ==
Barradam-bang wattle has only been recorded in three disjunct locations in New South Wales within 100 km (62 mi) of each another; in the Mullions Range north or Orange, near Clarence in the Blue Mountains east of Lithgow and Carcalgong–Aarons Pass area south of Mudgee. It grows in eucalypt woodland and open forest or shrub-dominated vegetation, often in disturbed areas in sandy or clayey soils.

== Conservation status ==
Acacia meiantha is listed as 'Endangered' under the Australian Government Environment Protection and Biodiversity Conservation Act 1999 and under the New South Wales Government Biodiversity Conservation Act 2016 (NSW).

== See also ==
- List of Acacia species
