= Brisbane County =

Brisbane New South Wales
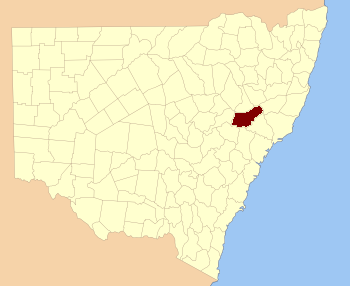
- Location in New South Wales
Lands administrative divisions around Brisbane:
Pottinger	Buckland	Parry
Bligh	Brisbane	Hawes
Phillip	Hunter	Durham

Brisbane County was one of the original Nineteen Counties in New South Wales and is now one of the 141 cadastral divisions of New South Wales. It includes Scone, Merriwa and Murrurundi. The Goulburn River is the boundary to the south and the Hunter River the boundary to the south-east. The Liverpool Range area is the boundary to the north, and the Krui River the boundary to the west.

Brisbane County was named in honour of Sir Thomas Makdougall Brisbane Governor (1773–1860). The Electoral district of Phillip, Brisbane and Bligh was the first electoral district for the area, between 1856 and 1859.

== Parishes within this county ==
A full list of parishes found within this county; their current LGA and mapping coordinates to the approximate centre of each location is as follows:

Parish	LGA	Coordinates
Ailsa	Upper Hunter Shire	32°03′54″S 150°11′04″E
Alma	Upper Hunter Shire	32°02′54″S 150°59′04″E
Boggibri	Upper Hunter Shire	32°02′54″S 150°16′04″E
Brawboy	Upper Hunter Shire	32°01′54″S 150°41′04″E
Brogheda	Muswellbrook Shire	32°11′54″S 150°43′04″E
Campbell	Upper Hunter Shire	32°17′54″S 150°18′04″E
Castle Sempill	Upper Hunter Shire	31°51′54″S 151°13′04″E
Cherson	Upper Hunter Shire	31°55′54″S 151°07′04″E
Clanricard	Muswellbrook Shire	32°14′54″S 150°45′04″E
Coulson	Upper Hunter Shire	31°58′54″S 150°24′04″E
Cranbourne	Upper Hunter Shire	32°00′54″S 150°19′04″E
Crawney	Upper Hunter Shire	31°44′54″S 151°08′04″E
Dangar	Muswellbrook Shire	32°21′54″S 150°27′04″E
Denman	Muswellbrook Shire	32°21′54″S 150°40′04″E
Ellerston	Upper Hunter Shire	31°45′54″S 151°13′04″E
Ellis	Muswellbrook Shire	32°12′54″S 150°50′04″E
Goulburn	Upper Hunter Shire	32°19′54″S 150°23′04″E
Guan Gua	Upper Hunter Shire	32°05′54″S 150°41′04″E
Gundy Gundy	Upper Hunter Shire	32°00′54″S 150°58′04″E
Hall	Upper Hunter Shire	32°10′54″S 150°32′04″E
Halscot	Upper Hunter Shire	32°08′54″S 150°47′04″E
Howard	Upper Hunter Shire	32°06′54″S 150°19′04″E
Isis	Upper Hunter Shire	31°49′54″S 151°01′04″E
Killoe	Upper Hunter Shire	32°06′54″S 150°10′04″E
Lincoln	Upper Hunter Shire	31°39′54″S 151°03′04″E
Mackenzie	Upper Hunter Shire	32°15′54″S 150°22′04″E
Macqueen	Upper Hunter Shire	32°07′54″S 150°57′04″E
Manbus	Upper Hunter Shire	32°01′54″S 150°46′04″E
Manobalai	Muswellbrook Shire	32°11′54″S 150°36′04″E
Melbourne	Upper Hunter Shire	31°59′54″S 150°49′04″E
Merriwa	Upper Hunter Shire	32°09′54″S 150°24′04″E
Murrurundi	Upper Hunter Shire	31°45′54″S 150°48′04″E
Murulla	Upper Hunter Shire	31°47′54″S 150°55′04″E
Myrabluan	Upper Hunter Shire	32°07′54″S 150°35′04″E
Nerobingabla	Upper Hunter Shire	31°55′54″S 150°36′04″E
Oxley	Upper Hunter Shire	31°55′49″S 150°19′35″E
Page	Upper Hunter Shire	31°54′54″S 150°58′04″E
Park	Upper Hunter Shire	32°00′54″S 150°53′04″E
Scone	Upper Hunter Shire	32°02′54″S 150°50′04″E
Strathearn	Upper Hunter Shire	32°08′54″S 150°51′04″E
Temi	Upper Hunter Shire	31°41′54″S 150°55′04″E
Terell	Upper Hunter Shire	31°55′54″S 150°30′04″E
Timor	Upper Hunter Shire	31°46′54″S 151°02′04″E
Tinagroo	Upper Hunter Shire	31°49′54″S 150°49′04″E
Tongo	Upper Hunter Shire	32°10′54″S 150°10′04″E
Tyrone	Upper Hunter Shire	32°03′54″S 150°38′04″E
Wandewoi	Upper Hunter Shire	31°44′54″S 151°20′04″E
Watt	Upper Hunter Shire	32°10′54″S 150°17′04″E
Waverly	Upper Hunter Shire	31°50′54″S 151°08′04″E
Webimble	Upper Hunter Shire	32°02′54″S 150°32′04″E
Wentworth	Upper Hunter Shire	31°54′54″S 150°26′04″E
Wickham	Upper Hunter Shire	32°14′54″S 150°31′04″E
Willis	Upper Hunter Shire	31°53′54″S 150°43′04″E
Wingen	Upper Hunter Shire	31°53′54″S 150°51′04″E
Wollara	Upper Hunter Shire	32°13′54″S 150°12′04″E
Worondi	Upper Hunter Shire	32°17′54″S 150°27′04″E
Wybong	Muswellbrook Shire	32°14′54″S 150°40′04″E
Yarraman	Muswellbrook Shire	32°14′54″S 150°37′04″E
