= Burrendong Dam =

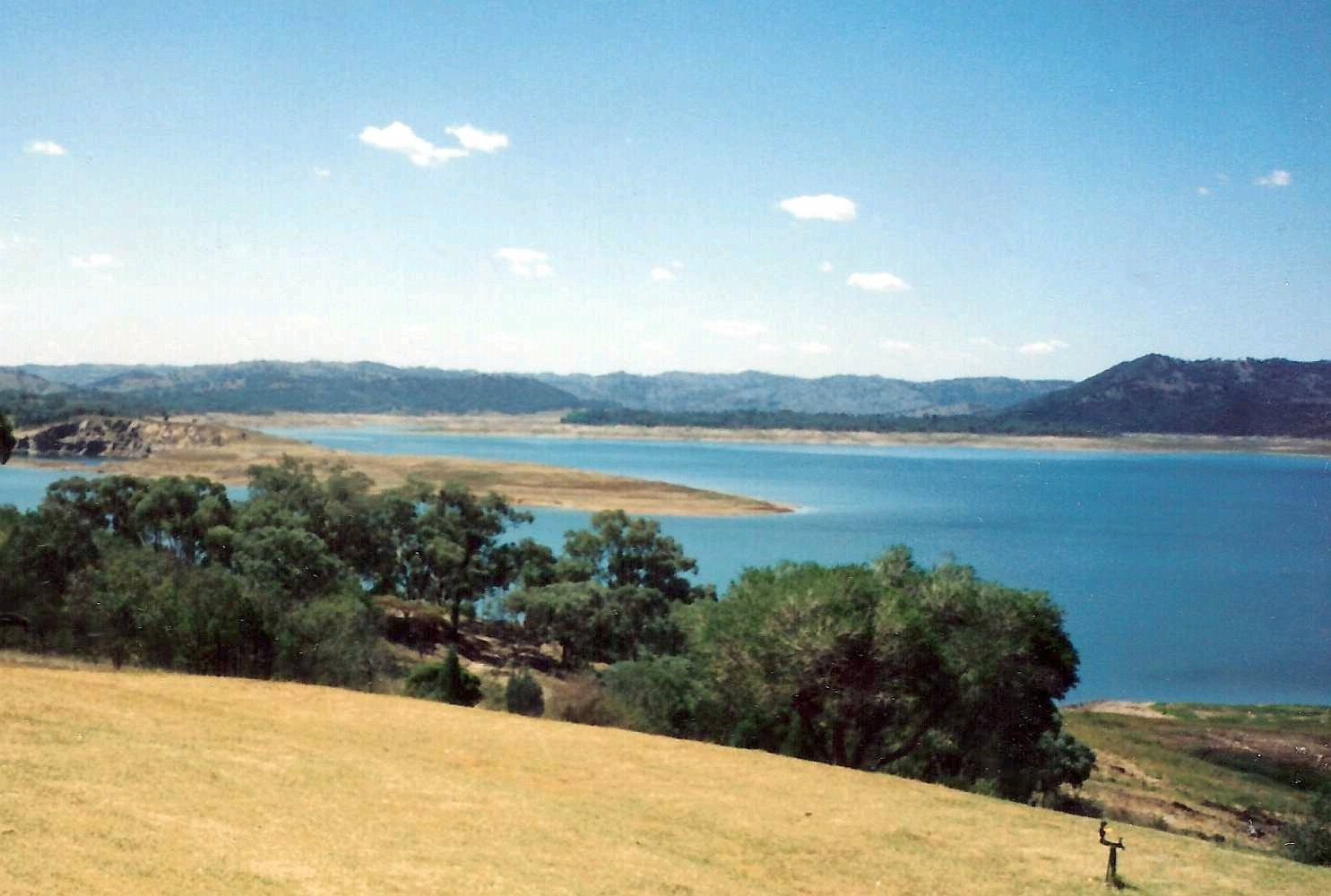
- Lake Burrendong, New South Wales, Australia

- Location of the Burrendong Dam in New South Wales
- Country: Australia
- Location: Wellington, New South Wales
- Coordinates: 32°40′4″S 149°6′25″E
- Purpose: Flood mitigation, irrigation, water supply
- Status: Operational
- Construction began: 1958
- Opening date: 1967
- Owner: State Water Corporation

Dam and spillways
- Type of dam: Embankment dam
- Impounds: Macquarie River
- Height: 76 metres (249 ft)
- Length: 1,116 metres (3,661 ft)
- Dam volume: 1,188,000 megalitres (42,000×10^{6} cu ft)
- Spillways: One
- Spillway type: Gated concrete chute
- Spillway capacity: 13,720 cubic metres per second (485,000 cu ft/s)

Reservoir
- Creates: Lake Burrendong
- Total capacity: 1,188 gigalitres (4.20×10^{10} cu ft)
- Catchment area: 13,886 square kilometres (5,361 sq mi)
- Surface area: 8,900 hectares (22,000 acres)
- Normal elevation: 344 metres (1,129 ft) AMSL

Power Station
- Operator: AGL Energy
- Commission date: 1996
- Type: Conventional
- Installed capacity: 19 megawatts (25,000 hp)
- Annual generation: 50.9 gigawatt-hours (183 TJ)
- Website; Burrendong Dam

Burrendong Dam is a rock-fill embankment major gated dam with a clay core across the Macquarie River upstream of Wellington in the central west region of New South Wales, Australia. The dam's purpose includes flood mitigation, irrigation, water supply and hydro-electric power generation. The dam impounds Lake Burrendong and is filled by the waters from the Macquarie, and Cudgegong rivers as well as Meroo Creek.

== History ==
The idea of building the dam arose in 1909. However, it was not until 1946 until legislation was passed to construct the dam. Construction commenced in 1950. The town of Mumbil expanded to accommodate the workers building the dam. The dam was completed in April 1965 and water began to flow into it for the first time. It was officially opened on 18 August 1967 by Robert Askin, the Premier of New South Wales. The date was chosen because it was the sesquicentenary of the town of Wellington. In September 1969 the dam was nearly full for the first time.

The village of Burrendong, once a gold-mining area, was flooded by the construction of the dam.

== Location and features ==
The Burrendong Dam is a major dam on the Macquarie River within the Macquarie Valley, approximately 30 kilometres (19 mi) southeast of Wellington. The dam was built by the New South Wales Water Conservation & Irrigation Commission for the purposes of providing flood mitigation, irrigation, and water supply.

The dam wall height is 76 metres (249 ft) and is 1,116 metres (3,661 ft) long. The water depth is 57 metres (187 ft) and at 100% capacity the water level is 344 metres (1,129 ft) AHD. The surface area of the dam is 7,200 hectares (18,000 acres) and the catchment area of the dam is 13,900 square kilometres (5,400 sq mi). At 100%, Burrendong Dam has a capacity of 1,188,000 megalitres (42,000×10^{6} cu ft). Additionally, the dam has a further flood mitigation capacity of 480,000 megalitres (17,000×10^{6} cu ft). The spillway on the dam is a gated concrete chute with a release capacity of 13,720 cubic metres per second (485,000 cu ft/s).

Burrendong Dam has three times been recorded at a critically low level of 1.5% in drought. Contrastingly, however, Burrendong has mitigated potentially devastating floods downstream by using its flood capacity and releasing water in accordance with downstream tributary flows, safely reaching 160% of capacity in 1990 and 152.8% in 2010. In January 2020, the lake was again reported to be at 1.6% level.

The A$32 million first phase of a major upgrade began in 2010 and is expected to be completed during 2015. This project will bring the dam up to modern safety standards including the raising of the main dam wall and saddle dam by 1.8 metres (5 ft 11 in) as well as modifications to the existing spillway, complemented by construction of an auxiliary spillway and fuse plug.

=== Power generation ===
A hydro-electric power station generates up to 19 megawatts (25,000 hp) of electricity from the flow of the water leaving Burrendong Dam. The average output is 50.9 gigawatt-hours (183 TJ) per annum. The station was completed in August 1996 and was officially opened on 9 February 1999 by the Premier of New South Wales, Bob Carr. At the time, the facility was operated by Power Facilities Pty Limited; and is now managed by AGL Energy.

An 800 megawatt, 15 hour (11,900 MWh) pumped-storage hydroelectricity project east of the lake (but not using the lake) won a state tender in early 2025. Two new reservoirs are to be built, with a height difference of 350 meters. Cost may be AUD1.8 billion.

== See also ==
- List of dams and reservoirs in New South Wales
