= Cook County, New South Wales =

Cook
- Cadastral division
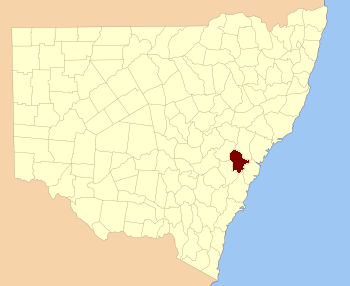
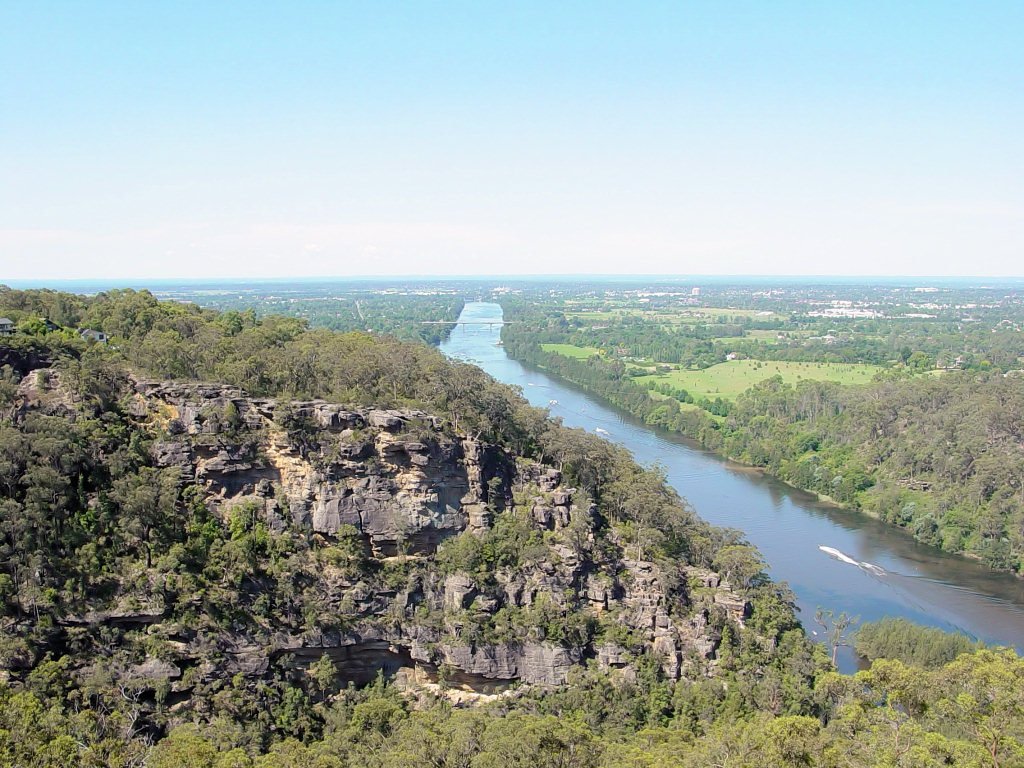
- Location in New South Wales Looking north on the Nepean River near Penrith; Cook County is on the left of the river; Cumberland is on the right
- Country: Australia
- State: New South Wales
Lands administrative divisions around Cook
Roxburgh	Hunter	Hunter
Westmoreland	Cook	Cumberland
Westmoreland	Camden	Cumberland

Cook County was one of the original Nineteen Counties in New South Wales and is now one of the 141 cadastral divisions of New South Wales. It includes the area to the west of Sydney in the Blue Mountains, between the Colo River in the north, and the Coxs River in the south and west, encompassing Lithgow, Mount Victoria, Katoomba, Wentworth Falls, Lawson and most of the other towns in the Blue Mountains. The Nepean River is the border to the east. Before 1834, the area was part of the Westmoreland, Northumberland and Roxburgh counties.

Cook County was named in honour of the navigator James Cook (1728–1779). The Electoral district of Cook and Westmoreland was the first state electoral district for the area, between 1856 and 1859.

== Parishes within this county ==
A full list of parishes found within this county; their current LGA and mapping coordinates to the approximate centre of each location is as follows:

Parish	LGA	Coordinates
Barton	City of Lithgow	33°14′54″S 150°15′04″E
Bilpin	City of Hawkesbury	33°29′54″S 150°30′04″E
Blackheath	City of Blue Mountains	33°38′54″S 150°19′04″E
Bowen	City of Blue Mountains	33°25′54″S 150°30′04″E
Burralow	City of Hawkesbury	33°33′54″S 150°35′04″E
Capertee	City of Lithgow	33°11′54″S 150°24′04″E
Clwydd	City of Lithgow	33°29′54″S 150°17′04″E
Colo	City of Hawkesbury	33°25′54″S 150°46′04″E
Cooba	City of Blue Mountains	33°52′54″S 150°27′04″E
Cook	City of Lithgow	33°17′46″S 150°13′42″E
Coomassie	City of Blue Mountains	33°38′54″S 150°34′04″E
Cox	City of Lithgow	33°19′54″S 150°05′04″E
Currency	City of Hawkesbury	33°32′54″S 150°45′04″E
Falnash	City of Lithgow	33°22′54″S 149°59′04″E
Gindantherie	City of Lithgow	33°09′54″S 150°15′04″E
Goollooinboin	City of Lithgow	33°10′54″S 150°08′04″E
Govett	City of Lithgow	33°14′54″S 150°26′04″E
Govett South	City of Lithgow	33°17′54″S 150°23′04″E
Grose	City of Blue Mountains	33°35′54″S 150°30′04″E
Hartley	City of Lithgow	33°33′54″S 150°14′04″E
Irvine	City of Hawkesbury	33°31′54″S 150°23′04″E
Jamison	City of Blue Mountains	33°42′54″S 150°22′04″E
Kanimbla	City of Lithgow	33°39′54″S 150°13′04″E
Kedumba	City of Blue Mountains	33°49′54″S 150°22′04″E
Kurrajong	City of Hawkesbury	33°33′54″S 150°39′04″E
Lett	City of Lithgow	33°31′54″S 150°09′04″E
Lidsdale	City of Lithgow	33°27′54″S 150°02′04″E
Linden	City of Blue Mountains	33°44′54″S 150°28′04″E
Magdala	City of Blue Mountains	33°44′54″S 150°33′04″E
Marrangaroo	City of Lithgow	33°25′54″S 150°10′04″E
Meehan	City of Hawkesbury	33°29′54″S 150°48′04″E
Megalong	City of Blue Mountains	33°44′54″S 150°15′04″E
Merroo	City of Hawkesbury	33°29′54″S 150°40′04″E
Mouin	City of Blue Mountains	33°51′54″S 150°15′04″E
Nepean	City of Hawkesbury	33°38′54″S 150°38′04″E
Rock Hill	City of Lithgow	33°22′35″S 150°18′24″E
Strathdon	City of Penrith	33°44′54″S 150°38′04″E
Warragamba	City of Blue Mountains	33°50′54″S 150°32′04″E
Wheeny	City of Hawkesbury	33°29′54″S 150°35′04″E
Wilberforce	City of Hawkesbury	33°31′24″S 150°51′04″E
Wolgan	City of Lithgow	33°14′54″S 150°10′04″E
Wollangambe	City of Lithgow	33°29′54″S 150°20′04″E
Wollangambe North	City of Lithgow	33°21′24″S 150°24′04″E
Wollemi	City of Hawkesbury	33°14′54″S 150°30′04″E
Woodford	City of Blue Mountains	33°39′54″S 150°30′04″E
