= Aarons Pass =

Locality in New South Wales

Aarons Pass New South Wales
- Coordinates: 32°52′28″S 149°48′17″E
- Population: 33 (SAL 2021)
- Postcode(s): 2850
- Time zone: AEST (UTC+10)
  - Summer (DST): AEDT (UTC+11)
- Location: 40 km (25 mi) NW of Mudgee; 90 km (56 mi) SSW of Bathurst; 220 km (137 mi) SE of Sydney
- LGA(s): Mid-Western Regional
- County: Roxburgh
- Parish: Tabrabucca
- State electorate(s): Bathurst
- Federal division(s): Calare
Localities around Aarons Pass:
| Carcalgong | Cudgegong | Cardwell |
| Carcalgong | Aarons Pass | Ilford |
| Crudine | Ilford | Ilford |

Aarons Pass is a locality in New South Wales' Central West region in the local government area of the Mid-Western Regional Council. At the 2021 census, the locality had a population of 33.

Aarons Pass is the first Australian Bureau of Statistics Suburbs and Localities (SAL) mesh block when listed alphabetically.

== Etymology ==
Aaron's Pass, a mountain saddle located in the centre of the locality, is the origin of the locality's name. The saddle, in turn, is named for Wiradjuri elder Aaron.

== Geography ==
The Cudgegong Creek, a tributary of the Cudgegong River, forms part of the locality's western boundary.

The Castlereagh Highway (B55) runs north–south through the locality's centre.

== History ==
Before European settlement, the locality of Aarons Pass and the entire Mid-Western Regional Council were the home of the Wiradjuri people.

After British arrival to the area, the first notable European to pass through the now locality was British explorer James Blackman. He led a party of three from Bathurst to swamps in Burrundulla just east of Mudgee, and was guided by his servant and Wiradjuri elder Aaron.

The name of the mountain pass was gazetted in 1973, with the locality being named and gazetted in 1995.

== Population ==
At the 2021 census, the locality had a population of 33, an increase of 33% from 2016.

At the 2016 census, the locality had a population of 22.

== See also ==
- Zuytdorp, Western Australia, the last ABS Suburbs and Localities mesh block alphabetically
