= Meroo River =

Coordinates: 32°4′50″S 149°29′00″E

Meroo River Meroo Creek

Location
- Country: Australia
- State: New South Wales
- Region: IBRA: NSW South Western Slopes
- District: Central West
- Municipalities: Mid-Western, Wellington

Physical characteristics
- Source: Capertee Valley
  - location: near Triangle Swamp
  - elevation: 776 m (2,546 ft)
- Mouth: confluence with the Cudgegong River
  - location: at Lake Burrendong
  - elevation: 342 m (1,122 ft)
- Length: 96 km (60 mi)

Basin features
- River system: Macquarie River, Murray–Darling basin
- Reservoir: Lake Burrendong

Meroo River, also called Meroo Creek, a watercourse that is part of the Macquarie catchment within the Murray–Darling basin, is located in the central western district of New South Wales, Australia.

The river rises on the western slopes of the Capertee Valley, near Triangle Swamp, and flows generally north, west, and north-west, joined by three minor tributaries, before reaching its confluence with the Cudgegong River, where it is impounded as Lake Burrendong, descending 434 metres (1,424 ft) over its 96 kilometres (60 mi) course.

== See also ==
- Rivers of New South Wales
- List of rivers of Australia
