= Windeyer, New South Wales =

Windeyer
- Town
- Coordinates: 32°47′00″S 149°32′00″E
- Country: Australia
- State: New South Wales
- LGA: Mid-Western Regional Council
- Location: 20 km (12 mi) S of Mudgee

Government
  - State electorate: Dubbo
  - Federal division: Calare

Population
  - Total: 187 (2021 census)
- Postcode: 2850

Windeyer is a locality in the Mid-Western Regional Council of New South Wales, Australia. As of the 2021 census, it had a population of 187.

Windeyer is a former goldmining town which has been described as "nearly a ghost town". At its peak during the gold rushes of the 1850s there were 29 hotels, 10 schools and numerous Chinese joss houses in the area, the town at that time spreading over several kilometres. It is now a small rural hamlet, containing a hotel (the Gold & Fleece Hotel), a general store with community post office & caravan park, a community hall, an Anglican church, a cemetery and numerous old houses and former shops and public buildings.

Windeyer Public School opened in November 1859, closed in April 1861, reopened in January 1866, and closed in December 2014.

Richardson's Point Post Office opened at Windeyer on 1 August 1854. It was renamed Windeyer Post Office c. 1859. It closed on 30 August 1986.

Windeyer Police Station was established in 1855 and closed "by late 2007".

== Heritage listings ==
Windeyer has a number of heritage-listed sites, including:

- Old Hargraves Road: Gold Mining Water Race
