= Hunter County =

Hunter New South Wales
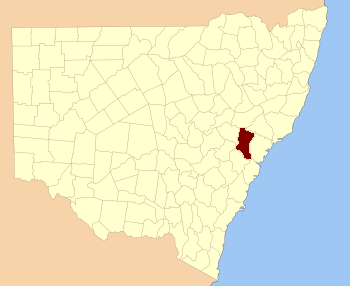
- Location in New South Wales
Lands administrative divisions around Hunter:
Phillip	Brisbane	Durham
Phillip	Hunter	Northumberland
Roxburgh	Cook	Cumberland

Hunter County was one of the original Nineteen Counties in New South Wales and is now one of the 141 cadastral divisions of New South Wales. It lies between the Hunter River in the north, and the Colo River in the south, including much of Wollemi National Park. Macdonald River lies to the east.

Hunter County was named in honour of Governor John Hunter (1737–1821).

== Parishes within this county ==
A full list of parishes found within this county; their current LGA and mapping coordinates to the approximate centre of each location is as follows:

Parish	LGA	Coordinates
Angorawa	City of Hawkesbury	33°18′54″S 150°44′04″E
Arndell	Muswellbrook Shire	32°21′54″S 150°34′04″E
Baerami	Muswellbrook Shire	32°24′54″S 150°27′04″E
Blackwater	Muswellbrook Shire	32°40′54″S 150°24′04″E
Bulga	Singleton Council	32°49′54″S 150°49′04″E
Bureen	Muswellbrook Shire	32°28′54″S 150°39′04″E
Capertee	City of Lithgow	33°05′54″S 150°23′04″E
Caroora	Muswellbrook Shire	32°33′54″S 150°25′04″E
Colo	City of Hawkesbury	33°23′24″S 150°47′04″E
Cook	City of Hawkesbury	33°15′54″S 150°35′04″E
Coonbaralba	Singleton Council	32°36′54″S 150°53′04″E
Coorongooba	City of Lithgow	32°57′54″S 150°18′04″E
Coricudgy	Muswellbrook Shire	32°52′54″S 150°25′04″E
Doyle	Singleton Council	32°35′54″S 150°48′04″E
Glen Alice	City of Lithgow	33°03′54″S 150°15′04″E
Grono	City of Hawkesbury	33°18′54″S 150°49′04″E
Gullongulong	Singleton Council	32°53′54″S 150°41′04″E
Gungalwa	Muswellbrook Shire	32°32′54″S 150°39′04″E
Hawkesbury	City of Hawkesbury	33°24′24″S 150°52′04″E
Hungerford	Muswellbrook Shire	32°36′54″S 150°32′04″E
Hunter	Muswellbrook Shire	32°28′54″S 150°45′04″E
Innes	City of Lithgow	33°04′54″S 150°29′04″E
Ivory	City of Hawkesbury	33°09′54″S 150°45′04″E
Jamison	City of Lithgow	32°59′54″S 150°22′04″E
Kekeelbon	Singleton Council	32°48′54″S 150°32′04″E
Kindarun	Singleton Council	32°49′54″S 150°42′04″E
Lemington	Singleton Council	32°32′54″S 151°00′04″E
Macdonald	City of Hawkesbury	33°17′54″S 150°56′04″E
Martindale	Muswellbrook Shire	32°34′54″S 150°44′04″E
McLean	Singleton Council	32°58′54″S 150°24′04″E
Medhurst	Singleton Council	32°45′54″S 150°37′04″E
Mediwah	Muswellbrook Shire	32°27′54″S 150°32′04″E
Mellong	City of Hawkesbury	33°15′54″S 150°44′04″E
Mirrie	Muswellbrook Shire	32°36′54″S 150°24′04″E
Monundilla	Muswellbrook Shire	32°42′54″S 150°31′04″E
Myrtle	Singleton Council	32°50′54″S 150°36′04″E
Nullo	Muswellbrook Shire	32°45′54″S 150°24′04″E
Palomorang	Singleton Council	32°45′54″S 150°43′04″E
Parnell	Singleton Council	32°41′54″S 150°54′04″E
Parr	City of Hawkesbury	33°20′24″S 150°38′04″E
Parry	Singleton Council	32°59′54″S 150°30′04″E
Phillip	Singleton Council	32°45′54″S 150°29′04″E
Piribil	Singleton Council	32°31′54″S 150°50′04″E
Poppong	Singleton Council	32°44′54″S 150°51′04″E
Putty	Singleton Council	32°58′54″S 150°45′04″E
Six Brothers	City of Hawkesbury	33°11′54″S 150°37′04″E
Sturt	Singleton Council	32°52′54″S 150°30′04″E
Tollagong	Singleton Council	32°55′54″S 150°37′04″E
Tomalpin	Muswellbrook Shire	32°32′54″S 150°33′04″E
Tonga	Singleton Council	32°40′54″S 150°45′04″E
Tupa	Singleton Council	33°00′54″S 150°37′04″E
Wambo	Singleton Council	32°31′54″S 150°55′04″E
Wareng	Singleton Council	32°50′54″S 150°47′04″E
Weeney	City of Hawkesbury	33°03′54″S 150°46′04″E
White	Muswellbrook Shire	32°39′54″S 150°38′04″E
Whybrow	Singleton Council	32°37′54″S 151°00′04″E
Wilpen	Muswellbrook Shire	32°28′54″S 150°26′04″E
Windsor	City of Hawkesbury	33°10′54″S 150°49′04″E
Wirraba	City of Hawkesbury	33°06′54″S 150°33′04″E
Wolgan	City of Lithgow	33°09′54″S 150°30′04″E
Wollemi	City of Hawkesbury	33°06′54″S 150°39′04″E
Womerah	City of Hawkesbury	33°14′54″S 150°53′04″E
Wonga	City of Hawkesbury	33°22′24″S 150°54′04″E
Yengo	City of Hawkesbury	33°02′54″S 150°49′04″E
