= Nineteen Counties =

Former limits of location in the colony of New South Wales, Australia

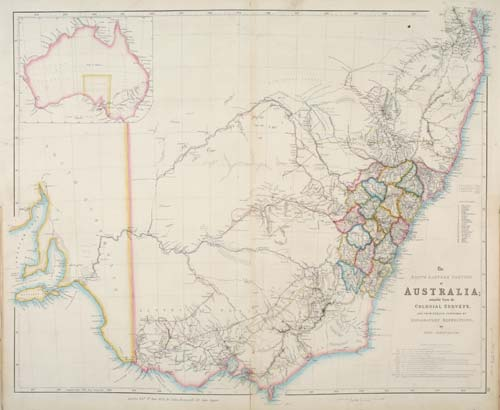
"The South Eastern Portion of Australia; compiled from the Colonial Surveys, and from details furnished by Exploratory Expeditions". Detailed map of New South Wales, issued in the London Atlas by John Arrowsmith. The "newly formed" counties are marked, as are the inland expeditions made 1817–1840.

The Nineteen Counties were the limits of location in the colony of New South Wales, Australia. Settlers were permitted to take up land only within the counties due to the dangers in the wilderness.

They were defined by the Governor of New South Wales Ralph Darling in 1826 in accordance with a government order from Lord Bathurst, the Secretary of State. Counties had been used since the first year of settlement, with Cumberland County being proclaimed on 6 June 1788. Several others were later proclaimed around the Sydney area. A further order of 1829 extended these boundaries of the settlement to an area defined as the Nineteen Counties. From 1831 the granting of free land ceased and the only land that was to be made available for sale was within the Nineteen Counties.

The area covered by the limit extended to Taree in the north, Moruya River in the south and Wellington to the West.

The Nineteen Counties were mapped by the Surveyor General Major Thomas Mitchell in 1834. The scale of the map that Mitchell produced was determined by the amount of ship's copper available in Sydney to engrave the map.

Despite the uncertainty of land tenure, squatters ran large numbers of sheep and cattle beyond the boundaries. From 1836 they could legally do so, paying £10 per year for the right. From 1847 leases in the unsettled areas were allowed for up to 14 years.

The Robertson Land Acts of 1861 allowed unlimited selection and sale of agricultural Crown land in designated unsettled areas at £1 per acre, making the limits of location of the nineteen counties redundant. The counties continue to be used for cadastral division purposes, and the rest of New South Wales was likewise divided into counties, totaling 141 by the end of the 19th century.

== Background ==
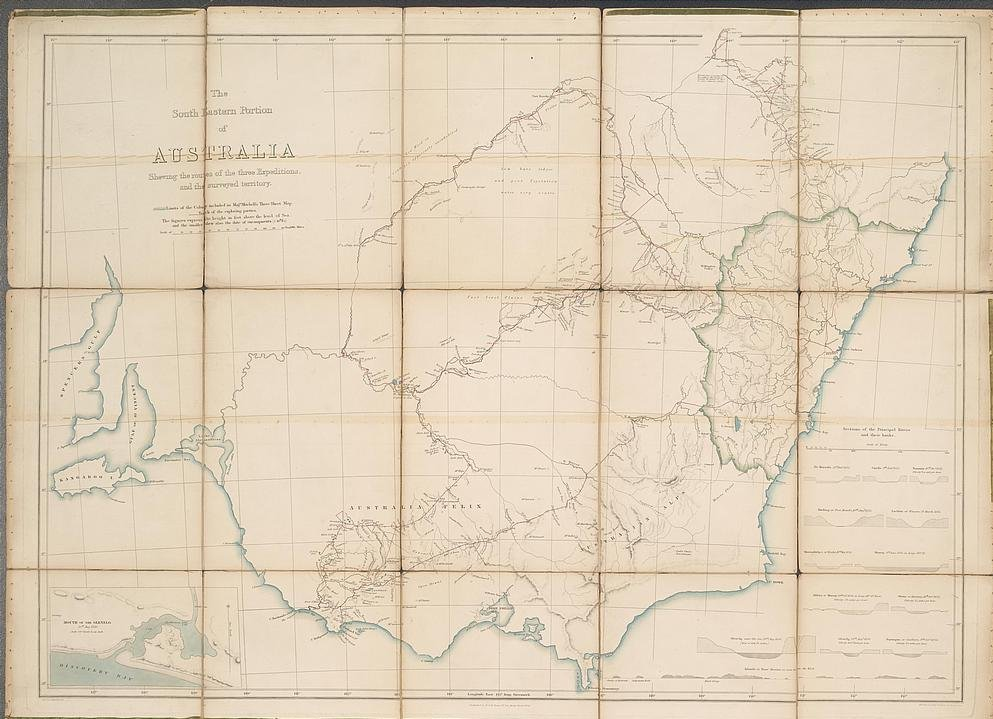
1838 map by Surveyor-General, Thomas Mitchell of Victoria and New South Wales showing towns, major rivers and the limits of the Colony at the time. The map also shows the routes taken by Mitchell's expedition and camps.

In January 1819, John Bigge was appointed a special commissioner to examine the government of the colony of New South Wales. Bigge arrived in Sydney in September 1819 gathering evidence until February 1821 when he returned to England. Bigge's first report was published in June 1822 and his second and third reports in 1823. His third report dealt with agriculture and trade.

In 1824, Governor Brisbane approved the sale of crown land in accordance with one of Bigge's recommendations. Previously only a nominal quit rent was required for grants by the crown. In 1825, Secretary of State Lord Bathurst instructed Governor Brisbane to survey the territory to allow for more planned settlement. During the survey one seventh of the land in each county was to be set a side for the Church of England and an educational system under the control of the church. Income from this land was to be managed under the Church and Schools Corporation.

When Governor Darling was commissioned in July 1825, his commission extended the New South Wales boundary six degrees to the west compared with the commissions issued to previous governors. In September 1826, Darling announced the boundaries within which the survey instructed by Bathurst in 1825 was to be conducted. The boundaries were the Manning River to the north, the Lachlan river to the west and the Moruya river to the south. Settlement beyond these boundaries was not to take place. The survey would allow the allocation of land grants and the boundaries, known as the limits of location, were used for other administrative purposes including police administration.

Darling proclaimed the division of the settlement into nineteen counties in the Sydney Gazette of 17 October 1829.

In some places there were already squatters beyond these boundaries.

== List ==
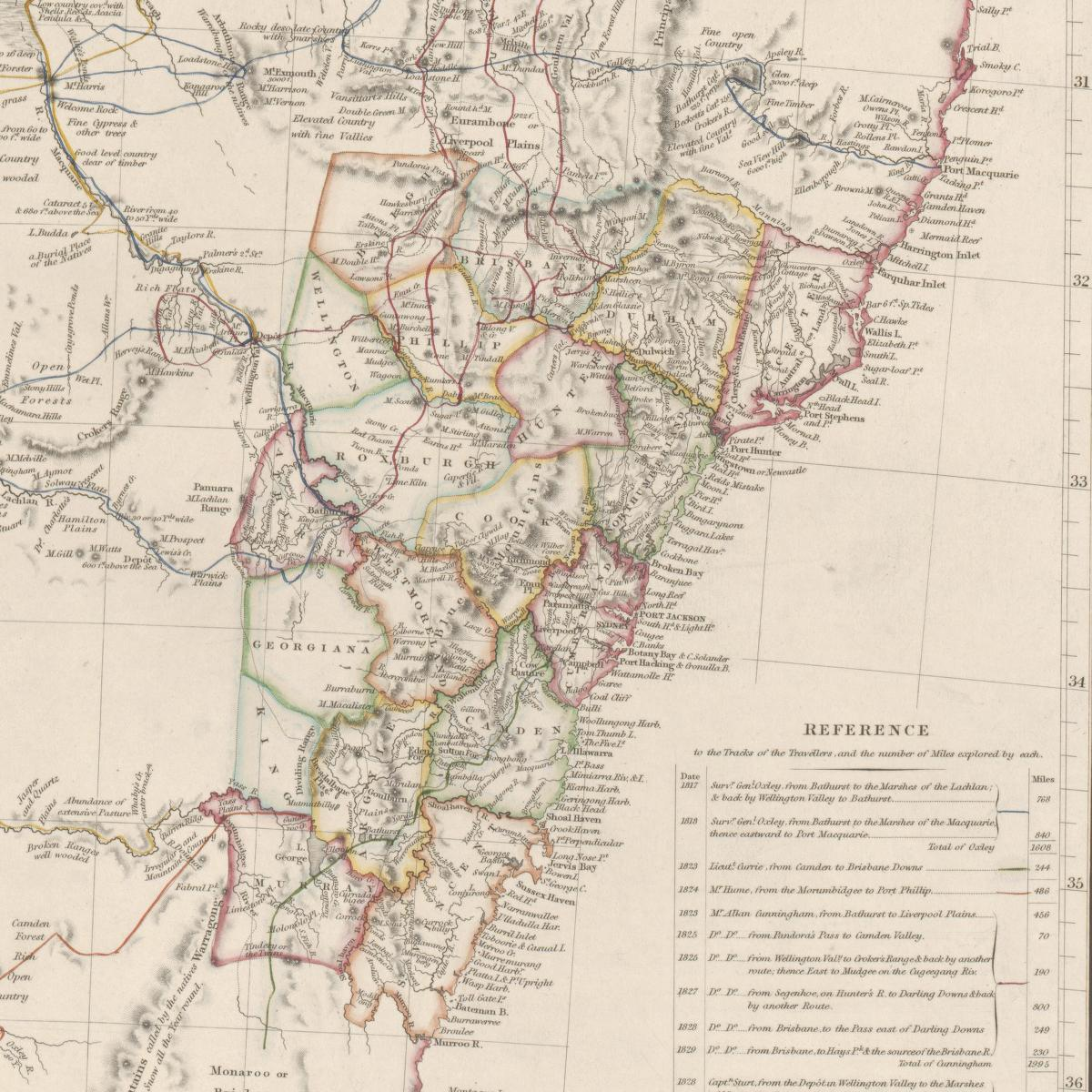
Nineteen counties, New South Wales, Australia, 1832

1. Gloucester: northernmost boundary was the Manning River; the county incorporated Port Stephens
2. Durham: west of Gloucester, southern Boundary was the Hunter River
3. Northumberland: northern boundary was the Hunter River and the southern boundary was formed by the Hawkesbury River
4. Cumberland: incorporated Sydney, Windsor, Parramatta, Liverpool and Appin to the south
5. Camden: included Camden, Picton and Berrima with the southernmost border defined by the Shoalhaven River
6. St Vincent: from the Shoalhaven River south to the Moruya River, included Jervis Bay, Batemans Bay and Braidwood
7. Hunter: west of the county of Northumberland, bounded by the Hunter River to the north
8. Cook: west of Cumberland county and south of the county of Hunter
9. Westmoreland: west of the counties of Cook and Camden
10. Georgiana: west of the county of Westmoreland
11. King: north of the county of Murray and west of the counties of Argyle and Georgiana
12. Murray: incorporating the Limestone Plains and Lake George, bounded by the Murrumbidgee River to the west, the south western extent of limits of settlement
13. Argyle: west of Camden county, included Goulburn, bounded by the Shoalhaven River to the south east
14. Roxburgh: north east of the county of Bathurst, west of the counties of Cook and Hunter
15. Bathurst: bounded by the Lachlan River to the south west, incorporating the town of Bathurst, west of the counties of Roxburgh and Westmoreland
16. Brisbane: north of the Hunter River, west of the county of Durham, one of the northernmost counties
17. Phillip: west of the county of Hunter and north of Roxburgh
18. Wellington: north of Bathurst, the town of Wellington was in the northwest of the county and the Macquarie River flowed through the middle
19. Bligh: the north-westernmost county, north of the county of Phillip and west of the county of Brisbane

== See also ==
- Robertson Land Acts
