= Durham County, New South Wales =

Durham New South Wales
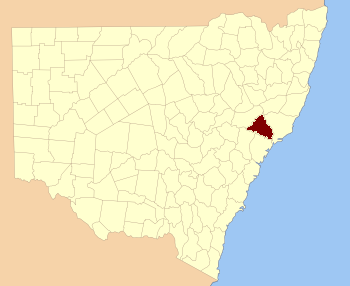
- Location in New South Wales
Lands administrative divisions around Durham:
Brisbane	Hawes	Gloucester
Brisbane	Durham	Gloucester
Hunter	Northumberland	Gloucester

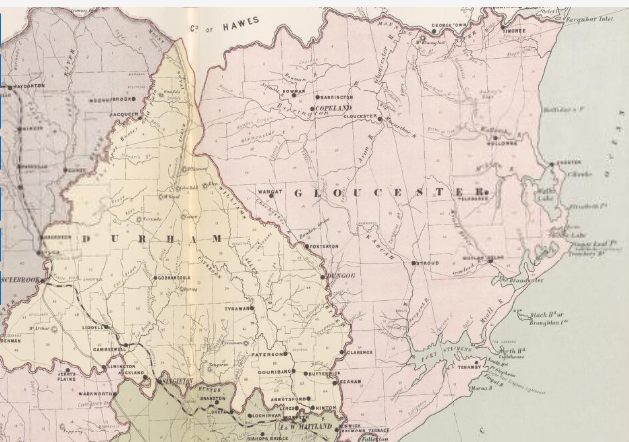
Map_of_Durham County_NSW_(Australia) in 1886

Durham County was one of the original Nineteen Counties in New South Wales and is now one of the 141 cadastral divisions of New South Wales. It is bordered on the south and west by the Hunter River, and on the north and east by the Williams River. It includes Aberdeen and Muswellbrook. Before 1834, the area known as Durham County included what later became Gloucester and most of Brisbane counties, as far west as the Liverpool Range, and east to the Pacific, including Port Stephens, as shown on an 1832 map.

Durham County was named in honour of John George Lambton, First Earl of Durham (1792–1840).

== Parishes within this county ==
A full list of parishes found within this county; their current LGA and mapping coordinates to the approximate centre of each location is as follows:

Parish	LGA	Coordinates
Allyn	Dungog Shire	32°07′54″S 151°28′04″E
Althorpe	Muswellbrook Shire	32°24′54″S 150°46′04″E
Auckland	Singleton Council	32°30′54″S 151°06′04″E
Avenal	Dungog Shire	32°18′54″S 151°34′04″E
Balmoral	Muswellbrook Shire	32°14′54″S 150°59′04″E
Barford	Dungog Shire	32°32′54″S 151°38′04″E
Belltrees	Upper Hunter Shire	31°58′54″S 151°10′04″E
Boonabilla	Dungog Shire	32°07′54″S 151°22′04″E
Bronte	Upper Hunter Shire	31°53′54″S 151°24′04″E
Brougham	Muswellbrook Shire	32°18′54″S 150°53′04″E
Butterwick	Port Stephens Council	32°39′54″S 151°38′04″E
Carrow	Dungog Shire	32°14′54″S 151°21′04″E
Chalmers	Upper Hunter Shire	32°02′54″S 151°13′04″E
Colonna	Dungog Shire	32°14′54″S 151°31′04″E
Darlington	Singleton Council	32°30′54″S 151°11′04″E
Doon	Upper Hunter Shire	32°05′54″S 151°15′04″E
Dungog	Dungog Shire	32°25′54″S 151°43′04″E
Dyrring	Singleton Council	32°25′54″S 151°17′04″E
Fingal	Dungog Shire	32°27′54″S 151°36′04″E
Foy	Muswellbrook Shire	32°13′54″S 151°09′04″E
Glendon	Dungog Shire	32°21′54″S 151°22′04″E
Goorangoola	Singleton Council	32°23′54″S 151°08′04″E
Gotha	Singleton Council	32°18′54″S 151°17′04″E
Gresford	Dungog Shire	32°29′54″S 151°32′04″E
Herschell	Muswellbrook Shire	32°13′54″S 151°05′04″E
Holywell	Dungog Shire	32°19′54″S 151°30′04″E
Houghton	Dungog Shire	32°36′0″S 151°33′57″E
Howick	Singleton Council	32°27′54″S 150°56′04″E
Lewinsbrook	Dungog Shire	32°22′54″S 151°33′04″E
Liddell	Muswellbrook Shire	32°21′54″S 151°00′04″E
Liebeg	Singleton Council	32°14′54″S 151°15′04″E
Mamaran	Upper Hunter Shire	31°47′54″S 151°24′04″E
Marwood	Singleton Council	32°33′54″S 151°21′04″E
Middlehope	Dungog Shire	32°39′54″S 151°38′04″E
Mirannie	Singleton Council	32°27′54″S 151°20′04″E
Moonan	Upper Hunter Shire	31°56′54″S 151°14′04″E
Mount Royal	Singleton Council	32°10′54″S 151°18′04″E
Oldcastle	Upper Hunter Shire	32°00′54″S 151°19′04″E
Omadale	Upper Hunter Shire	31°51′54″S 151°20′04″E
Prospero	Upper Hunter Shire	31°59′54″S 151°22′04″E
Ravensworth	Singleton Council	32°29′54″S 151°00′04″E
Rosamond	Singleton Council	32°09′54″S 151°15′04″E
Rouchel	Upper Hunter Shire	32°07′54″S 151°00′04″E
Rowan	Muswellbrook Shire	32°13′54″S 150°57′04″E
Russell	Upper Hunter Shire	32°09′54″S 150°57′04″E
Savoy	Muswellbrook Shire	32°20′54″S 150°57′04″E
Seaham	Port Stephens Council	32°39′25″S 151°41′57″E
Sedgefield	Singleton Council	32°31′54″S 151°15′04″E
Shenstone	Singleton Council	32°23′54″S 151°12′04″E
St Aubins	Upper Hunter Shire	32°10′54″S 151°00′04″E
St Julian	Dungog Shire	32°22′54″S 151°28′04″E
Stanhope	Singleton Council	32°33′54″S 151°25′04″E
Tangory	Singleton Council	32°28′54″S 151°24′04″E
Tillegra	Dungog Shire	32°20′54″S 151°42′04″E
Tudor	Upper Hunter Shire	32°10′54″S 151°08′04″E
Tyraman	Dungog Shire	32°29′54″S 151°30′04″E
Uffington	Dungog Shire, Port Stephens Council	32°35′54″S 151°44′04″E
Underbank	Dungog Shire	32°14′54″S 151°33′04″E
Vane	Singleton Council	32°26′54″S 151°07′04″E
Vaux	Muswellbrook Shire	32°20′54″S 150°47′04″E
Wallarobba	Dungog Shire	32°28′54″S 151°43′04″E
Wolfingham	Dungog Shire	32°37′54″S 151°29′04″E
Wynn	Muswellbrook Shire	32°21′54″S 150°52′04″E
