= Carroll, New South Wales =

Carroll New South Wales
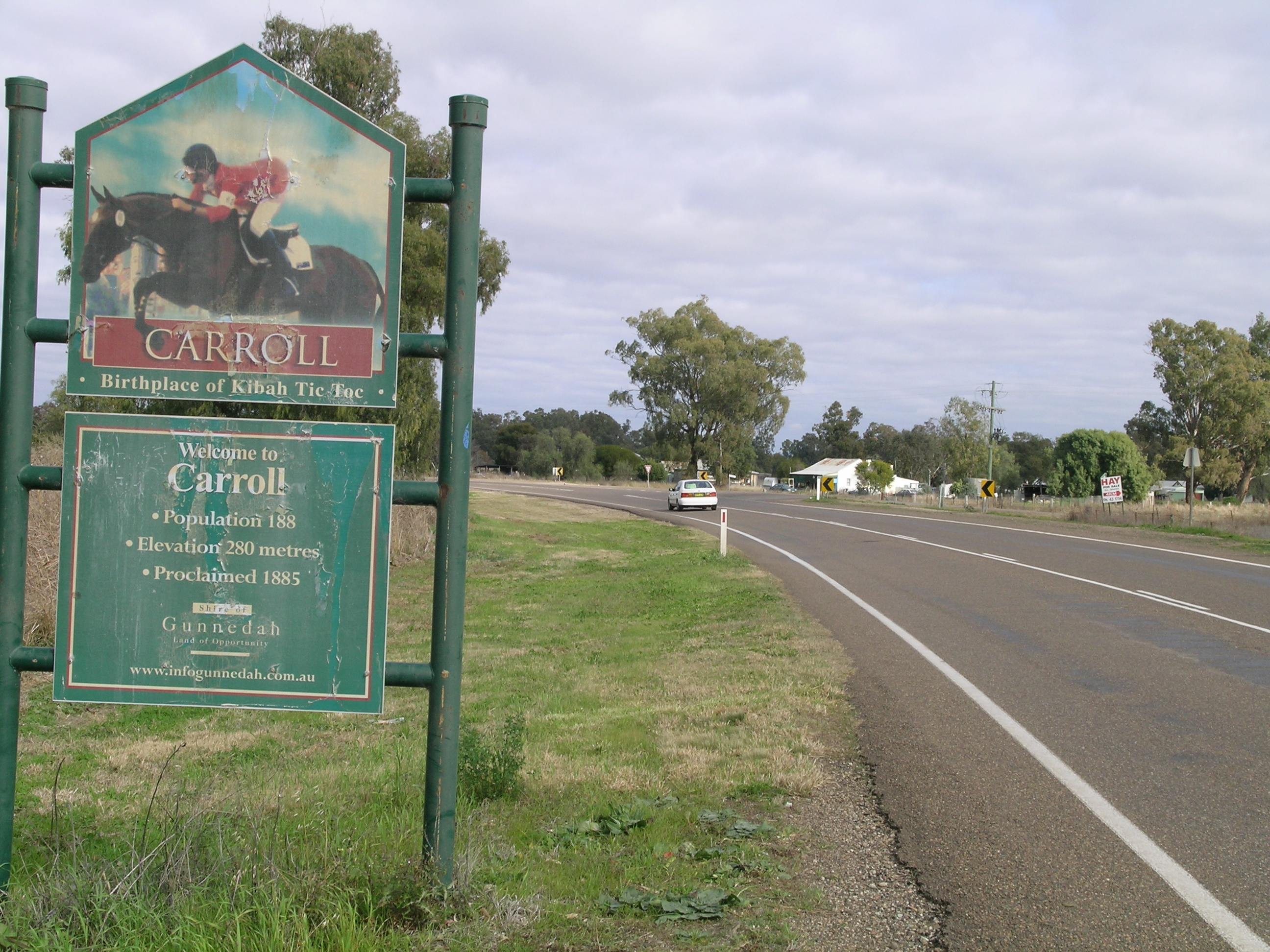
- Entry sign at Carroll

- Coordinates: 30°58′S 150°27′E
- Population: 337 (2016 census)
- Established: 1885
- Postcode(s): 2340
- Elevation: 280 m (919 ft)
- Location: 54 km (34 mi) from Tamworth; 450 km (280 mi) from Sydney
- LGA(s): Gunnedah Shire Council
- County: Buckland
- State electorate(s): Tamworth
- Federal division(s): Parkes

Carroll is a parish and small village on the Oxley Highway, 20 km east of Gunnedah, New South Wales. At the 2016 census, Carroll had a population of 337 people. The Namoi River runs approximately parallel to the highway which is also the main street there. Periodically this river floods the town and surrounding area, forcing the closure of the Oxley Highway. The surrounding area is part of the Liverpool Plains region.

== History ==
Carroll is an Irish surname coming from the Gaelic O Cearbhaill and Cearbhall, meaning "fierce in battle".

In 1839 John Howe of Windsor took out a Depasturing Licence for 'Carrol'. An adjoining 'Carrol' was held by Hannah Dight in 1846.

During December 1865 Captain Thunderbolt (Fred Ward) and two accomplices robbed the inn at Carroll then danced and drank until the police arrived. They wounded a policeman and escaped, abandoning three pack-horses.

The district produces cotton, wheat, other grains, fat lambs and beef cattle. The Olympic eventing horses, Kibah Tic-Tic, a noted dual gold medal winner and Kibah Sandstone (gold medallist in team & individual 1992, gold 2000) were bred on Kibah, a property close to the village.

According to the entry sign there are 188 people in the village. The village public school celebrated its sesquicentennial in 2019. There is also a local convenience store with fuel available.

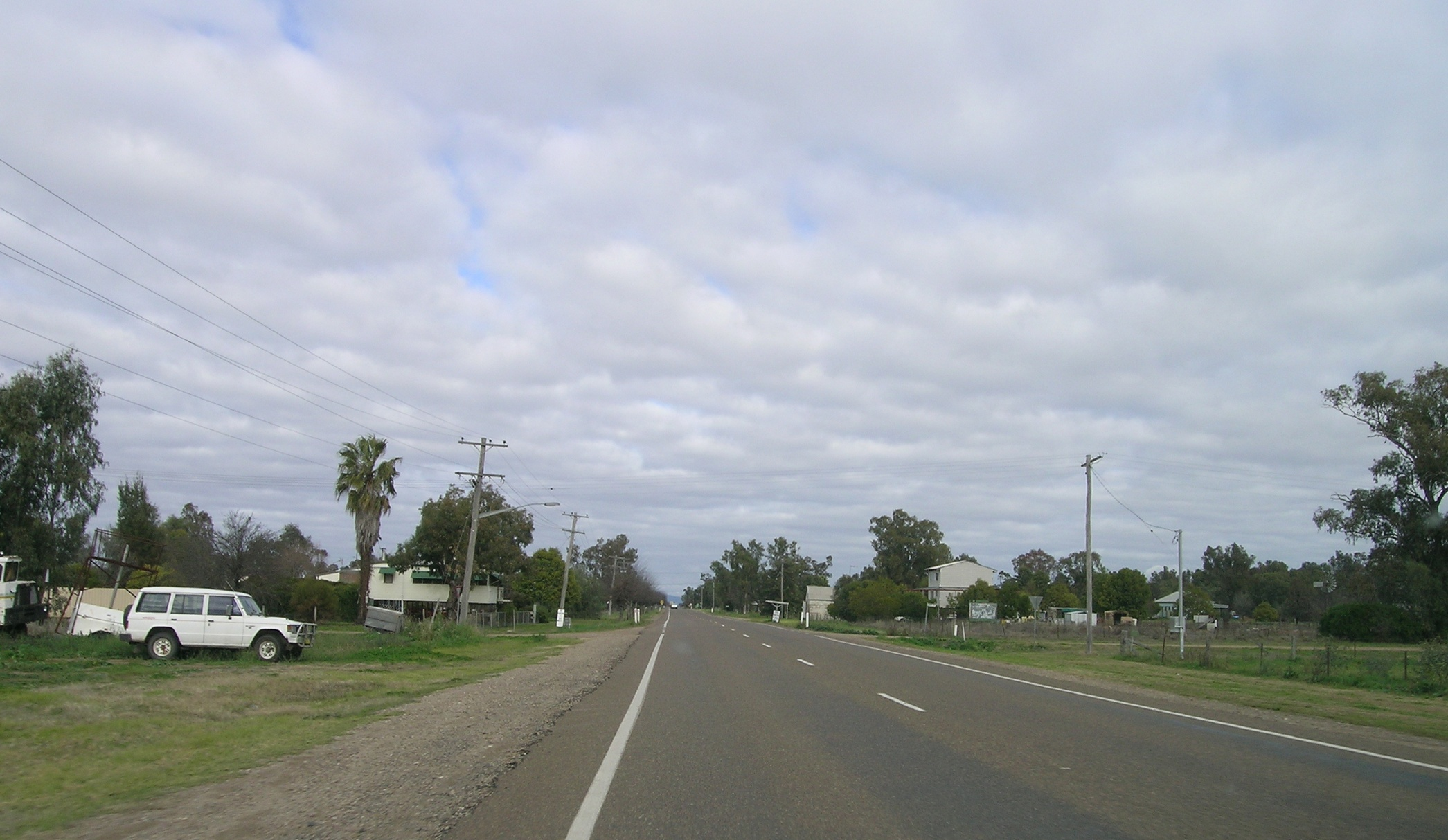
Oxley Highway, Carroll, NSW
