= Lake Burrendong =

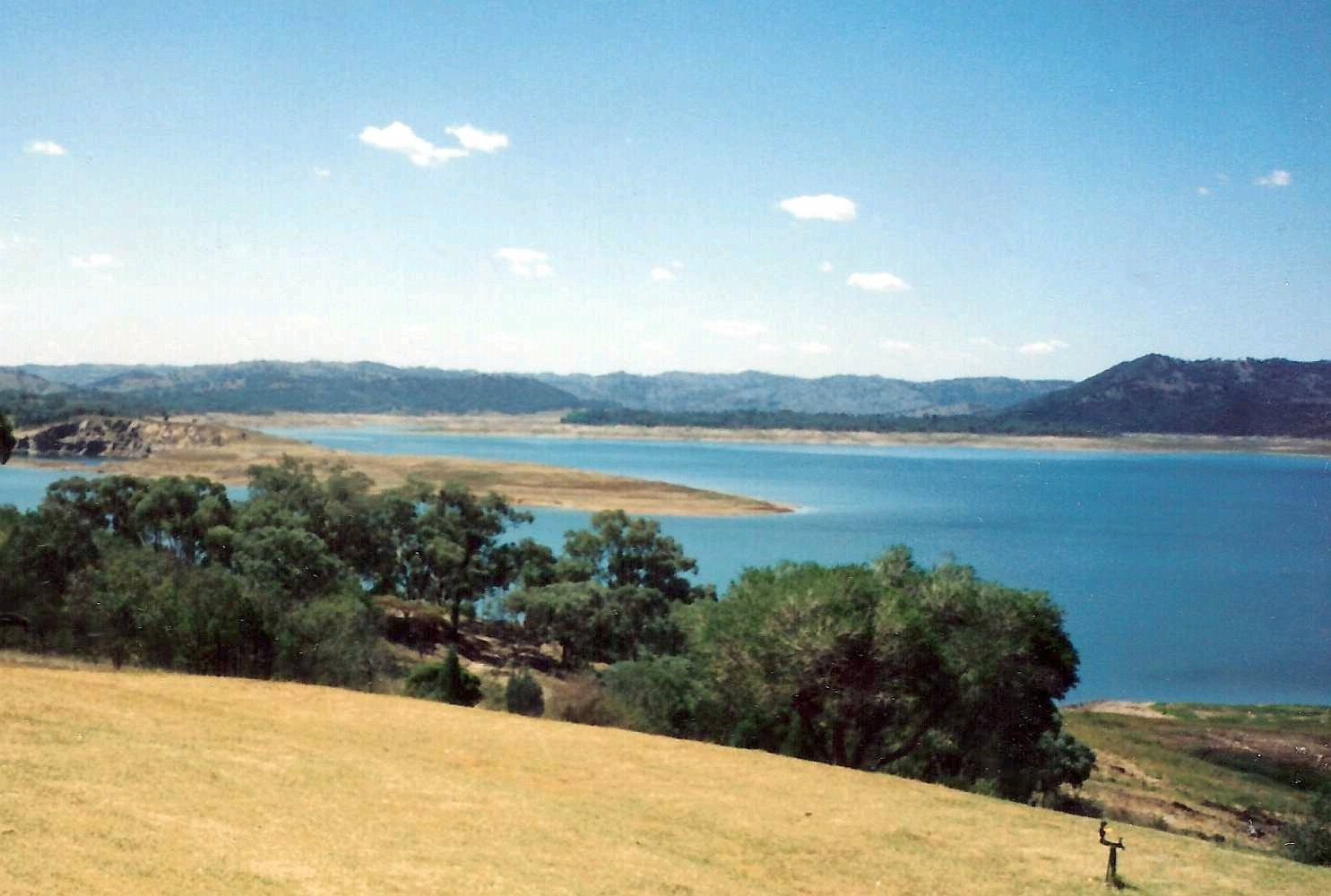
- A picnic area by the lake.

- Location within New South Wales
- Location: Wellington, New South Wales
- Coordinates: 32°40′S 149°8′E
- Lake type: Man-made reservoir
- Primary inflows: Macquarie River, Cudgegong River
- Primary outflows: Macquarie River
- Catchment area: 13,886 square kilometres (5,361 sq mi)
- Basin countries: Australia
- Surface area: 8,900 hectares (22,000 acres)
- Surface elevation: 344 metres (1,129 ft) AMSL

Lake Burrendong is a man-made reservoir created by Burrendong Dam. It impounds waters on the Macquarie and Cudgegong rivers, near Wellington, in the central west region of New South Wales, Australia.

== Location and features ==
The waters of the Macquarie and Cudgegong rivers and Meroo Creek flow into the man-made lake, which, when full, has a capacity of approximately 1,189,000 megalitres (42,000×10^{6} cu ft). With a catchment area of 13,886 square kilometres (5,361 sq mi) and a surface area of 8,900 hectares (22,000 acres), Lake Burrendong is a popular recreation area for fishing and tourism.

== History ==
In 2019 during a drought, the lake dried up and the former town that was inundated became visible again.
