= Wyaldra Shire =

Former local government area in New South Wales, Australia

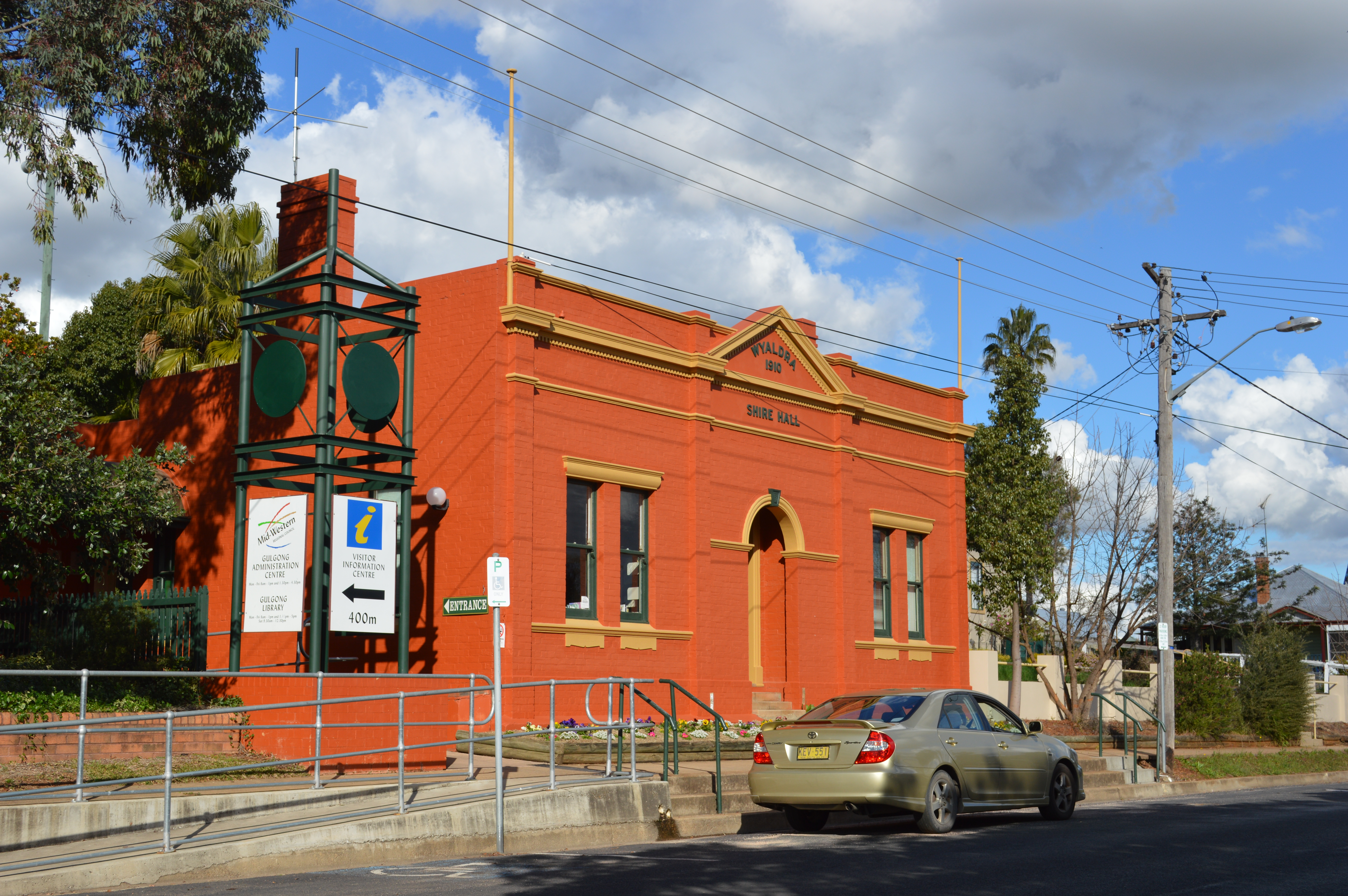
The former Wyaldra Shire Hall in Gulgong, now a visitor information centre

Wyaldra Shire was a local government area in New South Wales, Australia. It consisted of the area surrounding the town of Gulgong, with the shire offices located in Gulgong township.

It was established under the Local Government (Shires) Act 1905 with effect from 7 March 1906.

It amalgamated with the Municipality of Gulgong to form the Gulgong Shire on 1 January 1941.

The offices of the shire, constructed in 1910, still exist in Gulgong.
