= Cudgegong River =

Coordinates: 32°37′S 149°16′E

Cudgegong River Mudgee River
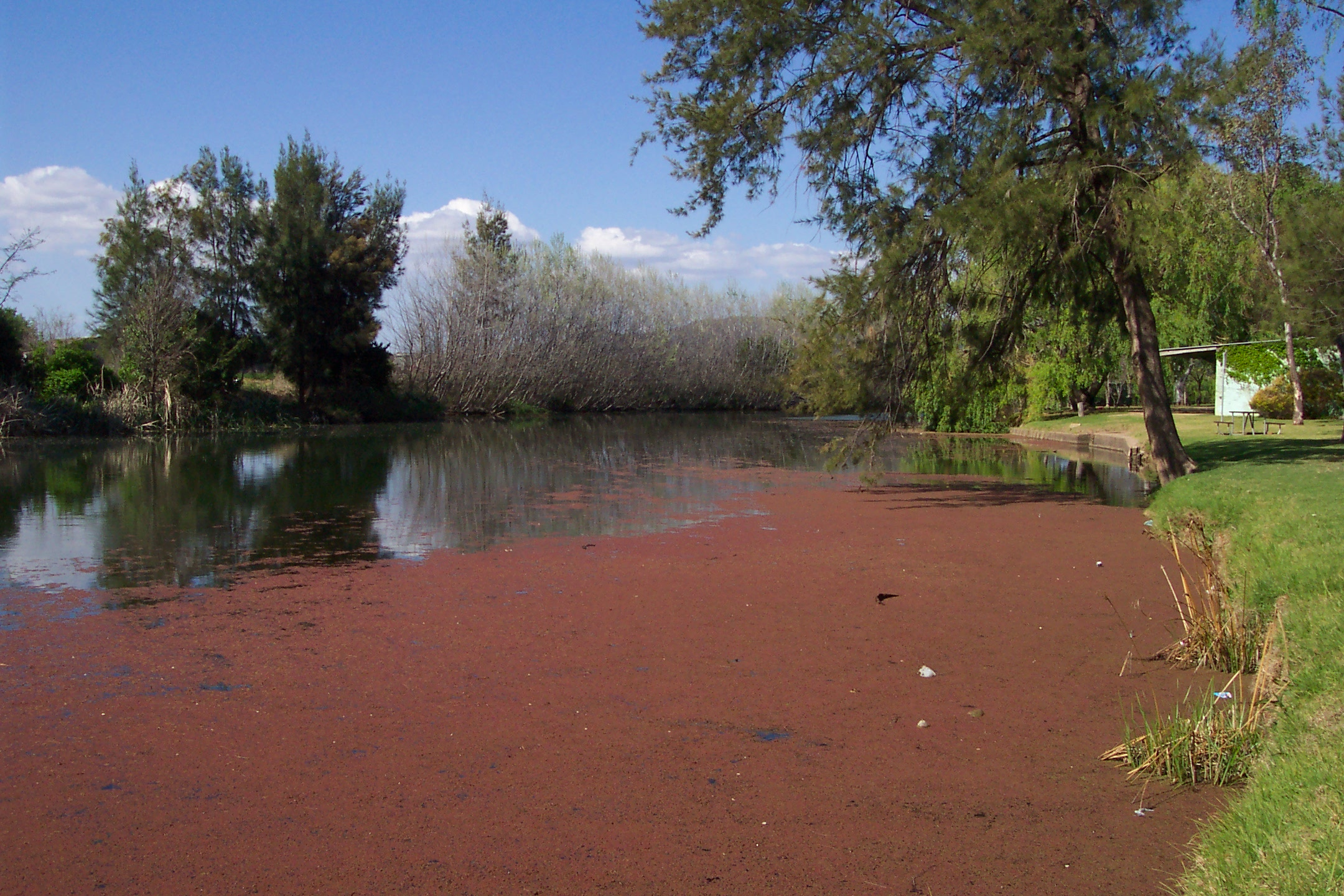
- Cudgegong River at Mudgee

Location
- Country: Australia
- State: New South Wales
- Region: South Eastern Highlands (IBRA), Central West, Orana
- Municipalities: Mid-Western, Wellington

Physical characteristics
- Source: Great Dividing Range
  - location: near Rylstone in Wollemi National Park
  - elevation: 766 m (2,513 ft)
- Mouth: confluence with the Macquarie River
  - location: Lake Burrendong
  - elevation: 341 m (1,119 ft)
- Length: 250 km (160 mi)

Basin features
- River system: Macquarie River, Murray–Darling basin
- Reservoirs: Rylstone Reservoir, Lake Windamere, Lake Burrendong

Cudgegong River, a perennial stream that is part of the Macquarie catchment within the Murray–Darling basin, is located in the central western and Orana districts of New South Wales, Australia.

The river rises of the western slopes of the Great Dividing Range within Wollemi National Park, east of Rylstone, and flows generally west, north-west, and south-west, joined by fourteen tributaries, including Wyaldra Creek and Lawsons Creek, before reaching its confluence with the Macquarie River at Lake Burrendong, descending 425 metres (1,394 ft) over its 250-kilometre (160 mi) course.

Several reservoirs, including Rylstone Reservoir and Lake Windamere, impede the natural flow of the Cudgegong River past the towns of Mudgee, and near Gulgong.
