= Mid-Western Regional Council =

Mid-Western Regional
- Local government area
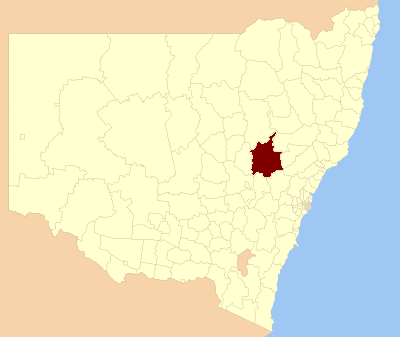
- Location in New South Wales

- Interactive map of Mid-Western Regional
- Coordinates: 32°35′S 149°41′E
- Country: Australia
- State: New South Wales
- Region: Central West
- Established: 26 May 2004
- Council seat: Mudgee

Government
  - Mayor: Alex Karavas (Unaligned)
  - State electorates: Dubbo; Bathurst; Upper Hunter
  - Federal divisions: Parkes; Hunter

Area
  - Total: 8,737 km^{2} (3,373 sq mi)

Population
  - Totals: 24,076 (2016 census); 25,086 (2018 est.)
  - Density: 2.75564/km^{2} (7.1371/sq mi)
- Website: Mid-Western Regional
LGAs around Mid-Western Regional
Dubbo	Upper Hunter	Muswellbrook
Dubbo	Mid-Western Regional	Singleton
Bathurst	Lithgow	Lithgow

The Mid-Western Regional Council is a local government area in the Central West region of New South Wales, Australia. The area is located adjacent to the Castlereagh Highway that passes through the middle of the area in an approximate southeast–northwest direction.

Mid-Western Regional Council was proclaimed on 26 May 2004 and incorporates the whole of the former Mudgee Shire Council and parts of the former Merriwa and Rylstone Shires. The Mid-Western Regional Council also incorporated the area of the historic Wyaldra Shire, which was abolished in an earlier round of local government amalgamations. A historic building in Gulgong, built in 1910, served as the former shire headquarters. On 26 November 2004, it assumed the assets and operations of the former Mid-Western County Council.

The mayor of Mid-Western Regional Council is Des Kennedy, who is unaligned with any political party.

== Towns and localities ==
The largest town and council seat is Mudgee. The region also includes the towns of Gulgong, Rylstone and Kandos, the villages of Bylong and Ilford, and the localities of Aarons Pass and Bombira. Most of the LGA is agricultural with a strong presence from coal mining, but it includes several historical towns.

== Council ==
=== Current composition and election method ===
Mid-Western Regional Council is composed of nine councillors elected proportionally as a single ward. All councillors are elected for a fixed four-year term of office. The mayor is elected by the councillors at the first meeting of the council.

== Election results ==
=== 2024 ===
2024 New South Wales local elections: Mid-Western
Party	Candidate	Votes	%	±%
Independent	Des Kennedy (elected 1)	1,994	13.0	
Labor	1. Sharelle Fellows (elected 2); 2. Rodney Pryor; 3. Janet Duffy; 4. Peter Clarke; 5. Simon Davies	1,747	11.3	
Independent	1. Katie Dicker (elected 4); 2. Sally Mayberry; 3. Katherine McDonald; 4. Rachel McKeown; 5. Shahna Smith	1,310	8.5	+1.9
Independent	1. James Thompson (elected 6); 2. Anthony (Buzzy) Westaway; 3. Matthew Purtle; 4. Robyn Jones; 5. Jack Rayner; 6. Graham Chadwick	1,262	8.2	−5.1
Independent	1. Alex Karavas (elected 5); 2. Samuel Kiho; 3. Sharon Traemer; 4. Angus Buckley; 5. Liam Jeffery	1,136	7.4	0.0
Independent	1. Peter Shelley (elected 8); 2. James Johnson; 3. Alannah Rankin; 4. Helen Fuller; 5. Craig Parsons; 6. Doreen Shelley	1,103	7.2	−2.3
Independent	1. Robert Palmer (elected 7); 2. Peter Crawley; 3. Jackson Lambkin; 4. Abby Lynch; 5. Nathan Henwood	1,062	6.9	=3.3
Independent	Elwyn Lang (elected 3)	1,023	6.6	
Independent	1. Marcus Cornish (elected 9); 2. Adrienne Morrison; 3. Stacey Carter; 4. Margaret Cornish; 5. Gerard Morrison	1,022	6.6	
Greens	1. Richard Holz; 2. Janet Walk; 3. Bruce Christie; 4. Anthea Nicholls; 5. Chris Pavich	941	6.1	
Independent	1. Col Doyle; 2. Matt Eltis; 3. Daniel Lewis; 4. Heather Rushton; 5. Brendan Boyd	793	5.2	
Independent	1. Kim Edwards; 2. Rebecca Saunders; 3. David McLennan; 4. Jennifer MacNaughton; 5. Yash Godbole	722	4.7	
Independent	1. Grant Gjessing; 2. Alison Broinowski; 3. Brendon Cocks; 4. James Williams; 5. Terri Gricks	698	4.5	
Independent	Michael John Sweeney	278	1.8	
Independent	Simon Staines	133	0.9	+0.3
Independent National	Sandy Walker	119	0.8	
Independent	Matthew Cooper	56	0.4	
Total formal votes		15,399	92.3	
Informal votes		1,279	7.7	
Turnout		16,678	86.4	
