= Bridle Track =

Historic road in New South Wales, Australia

The Bridle Track New South Wales
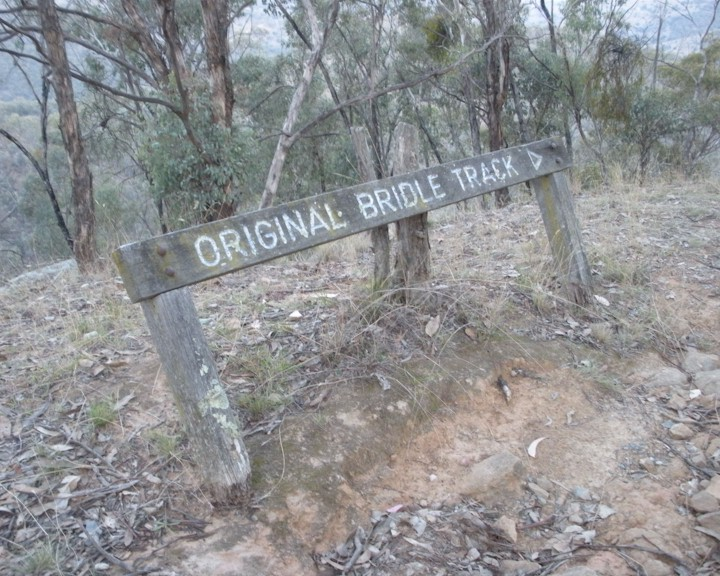
- A sign pointing to the original Bridle Track, pictured in 2009
- Location in New South Wales
- Coordinates: 33°02′0″S 149°25′0″E (North end); 33°25′12″S 149°34′40″E (South end)

General information
- Type: Track
- Opened: c. 1850

Major junctions
- North end: Hill End
- Sofala
- South end: Bathurst

Location(s)
- Region: Central West NSW
- LGA(s): Bathurst Regional Council

Highway system
- Highways in Australia; National Highway • Freeways in Australia; Highways in New South Wales

The Bridle Track is an historic walking and horse trail between Bathurst and Hill End, located in the Bathurst Region local government area, in the Central West region of New South Wales, Australia. The trail is likely to have been established in c. 1850s. The name of the trail is derived from the word bridle, referring to the horse livery and the track generally distinguished it from a road or carriageway; a common term used from the mid-1800s to describe the many foot worn trails that developed between towns and villages by walkers and horses.

The bridle track referred to here is unusual in that it is still known as the 'Bridle Track' largely because it has remained relatively unimproved and much on its original alignment for more than a century. Most other tracks have either been abandoned and overgrown or alternatively have become roads with distinct names.

== Route ==
The Bridle Track began as a shorter alternative route to Hill End Road, the road that links the city of Bathurst with the village of Hill End, via Sofala. and Sallys Flat. The Bridle Track referred to here is the northern portion of that alternative route. The southern part, which branches from Turondale Road, is also known as The Bridle Track, but consists of conventional roads, both sealed and gravel.

The northern section, referred to here as the Bridle Track, commences at the Winburndale Creek crossing and extends to the village of Hill End, becoming Beard Street where it enters the village area. The route essentially follows the Macquarie River, on its right bank, to its junction with the Turon River. It then follows the Turon River valley, crossing the river once from its left to right bank, until near where the river is at its closest to Hill End. The northernmost section is a steep climb out of the river valley to Hill End.

== History ==
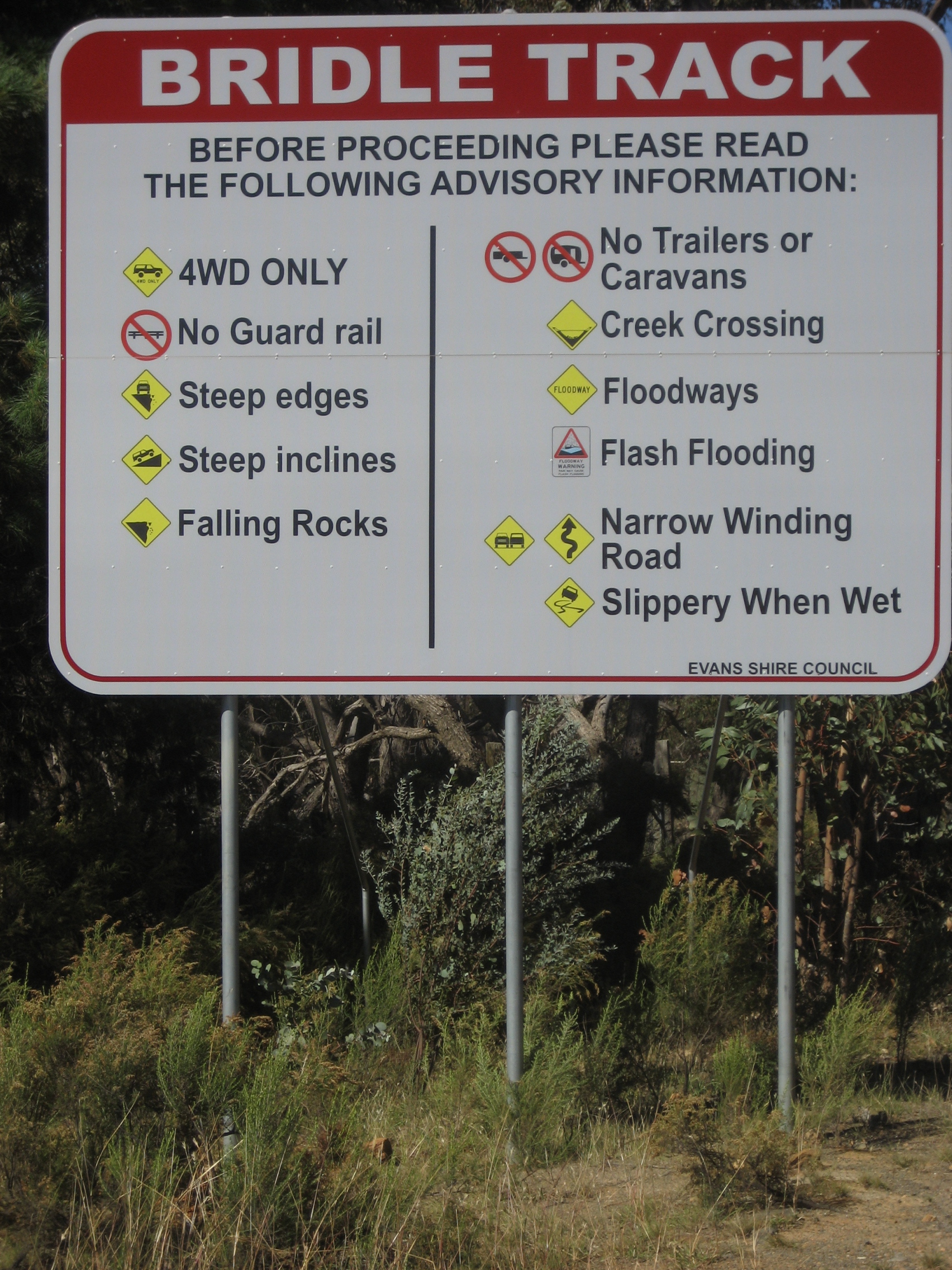
A warning sign in Hill End at the northern end of the Bridle Track, pictured in 2008

From the early days of Hill End it appears that a narrow trail, only suitable for pedestrians and riders on horseback, wove a very windy and hilly trail along the steep cuttings and over the hills beside the Macquarie and Turon Rivers to the major town of Bathurst. This trail along the Macquarie and Turon Rivers was quite likely first used in the 1850-60's when Gold was first discovered in the Hill End locality. A newspaper reporters reference to a Bridle Track approaching Hill End from the south was written in 1865. In 1871 it was recognized as a much shorter and quicker route to Hill End but the last six miles were impassable by other than by horse back riders.

In the early 1870s an accommodation house known as Foot's was located about 18 miles from Bathurst, about halfway along the journey and at the start of the Bridle Track section. In 1872 the first of the improvements were made to the narrow track at Hawkins Hill, where the steep climb of the hill was replaced with a winding carriage track climbing around the hill. Miners had set up tents along the Rivers adjacent to the road and many Chinese with their vegetable plots could be seen along the track. At the foot of Hawkins Hill was the locality of Lower Turon and here an Inn known as Braggs Inn was located. Nine miles south of Hill End was a mining locality on the Bridle Track called the Root Hog.

In 1874 a buggy pulled by a single horse completed the journey along the Bridle Track after some improvement work on the track was carried out by a resident of Bathurst. This buggy ride was considerably faster than the official route to Bathurst and started the talk of creating a permanent roadway of the narrow track.

In 1876 various business and residents commenced lobbying in earnest to develop the narrow pony track, at that stage only suitable for horses, into a carriageway to allow horse-drawn carriages to travel the route. Without this new route all carriages and stage coaches had to travel from Bathurst via Peel and Sofala to Hill End a distance of 97 kilometres (60 mi), this route took 12 hours by Cobb & Co stage coach. The upgraded shorter Bridle Track route would save more than 32 kilometres (20 mi). Work commenced in 1878 on the widening of the track into a horse-drawn carriage roadway.

In 1878 it was proposed by a Hill End committee to sacrifice the pony mail run from Bathurst to Hill End via the Bridle Track in lieu of keeping a six-day a week mail coach via Peel and Sofala. This was in response to the Postmaster General deciding to reduce the coach mail to three days per week. It appears that the Bridle Track pony mail was discontinued as in 1878 a petition was started to recommence a mail run from Bathurst to Hill End via the Bridle Track.

The following contemporary account from 1876, details the process for determining options for upgrading the track for horse-drawn vehicles:

A meeting of the Bridle Track Committee was held last night at Weir's hotel, the mayor, Mr. L. Beyers, in the chair. Its object was to decide on a route to be surveyed in addition to the one now being laid out. It will be remembered that the latter was selected by the Government road surveyor of this district, and is to my mind, so far as I have had the opportunity of following it, far in advance of the present bridle track. However, some of the committee think that a better line can be laid out and to that end have obtained from the Roads Department a promise to survey any line they may point out, to compare the two, and select the better. Amongst the committee three lines are advocated, all converging on Bruin Bun, which I will particularize as Glines, Mosedales and Bragg's. The two former propose to cross the Turon at the mouth of Oakey Creek, and ascend immediately by the spurs on the south side. Cline's track has a considerable advantage between the top of the hill and Bruin Bun, but requires, it is said, a great outlay to mount the hill. Mosedale's would reach the 'finger post,' or Trig station, by a very easy route, crossing at Oakey Creek. Bragg would strike the same level a little beyond the 'finger post', but would make a start from the road already completed at the Root Hog racecourse. The committee decided on Mosedale's line, in consideration of its being two miles shorter than Bragg's, and probably costing no more, considering that the difficulty of ascending by Cline's more than counter balanced its acknowledged advantages from the top to Bruin Bun. The only drawback to this second survey is the loss of time involved, as the same surveyor has to do the two. For my own part I should be glad to see half a dozen made, if as many routes could be suggested and compared; but let them all be carried on simultaneously by different men, so that no loss of time may be involved. Let the best road for general public be selected without reference to prejudice or vested interests of any kind.

— Sydney Mail and New South Wales Advertiser, 16 December 1876.

The route is through rugged and remote countryside and has often been closed by washaways and rockfalls. In 1909 the road was closed and again in 1912. The Turon Shire Council carried out repair work on the road and during 1914 it was again passable by horse-drawn vehicles, such as a Trap carriage. Again in 1917 the road closed due to washaways and remained closed for 12 months.

A newspaper report in 1933 indicates that the road had not been used by motor vehicles to this date and it is not known how long after did a motor vehicle traverse the Bridle Track.

Between 1937 and 1940 the road was upgraded by the Turon Shire Council with funds provided by the NSW Government. In 1937 approximately 70 unemployed men, were engaged on the work as an unemployment relief project. The work was intended to provide a scenic tourist route along the river. The workforce expanded to about 250 men in 1939.

== Present day ==
In 2010 the road was closed as a through road due to a landslide at Monaghans Bluff.

Work commenced to build a detour around Monaghans Bluff in February 2021, after the acquisition of several properties to allow a detour to be built. It was anticipated that this work would take around 12 months, before the full length of the road could be re-opened to traffic again.

On 13 February 2023 the Bridle Track was reopened, with a diversion track passing above Monaghans Bluff. This came after many years of lobbying by local residents and the 4WD NSW-ACT Association, and with funding from NSW State Government and Bathurst City Council.

== See also ==
- List of roads in New South Wales
- List of historical roads of New South Wales
