= Ben Chifley Dam =

Chifley Dam
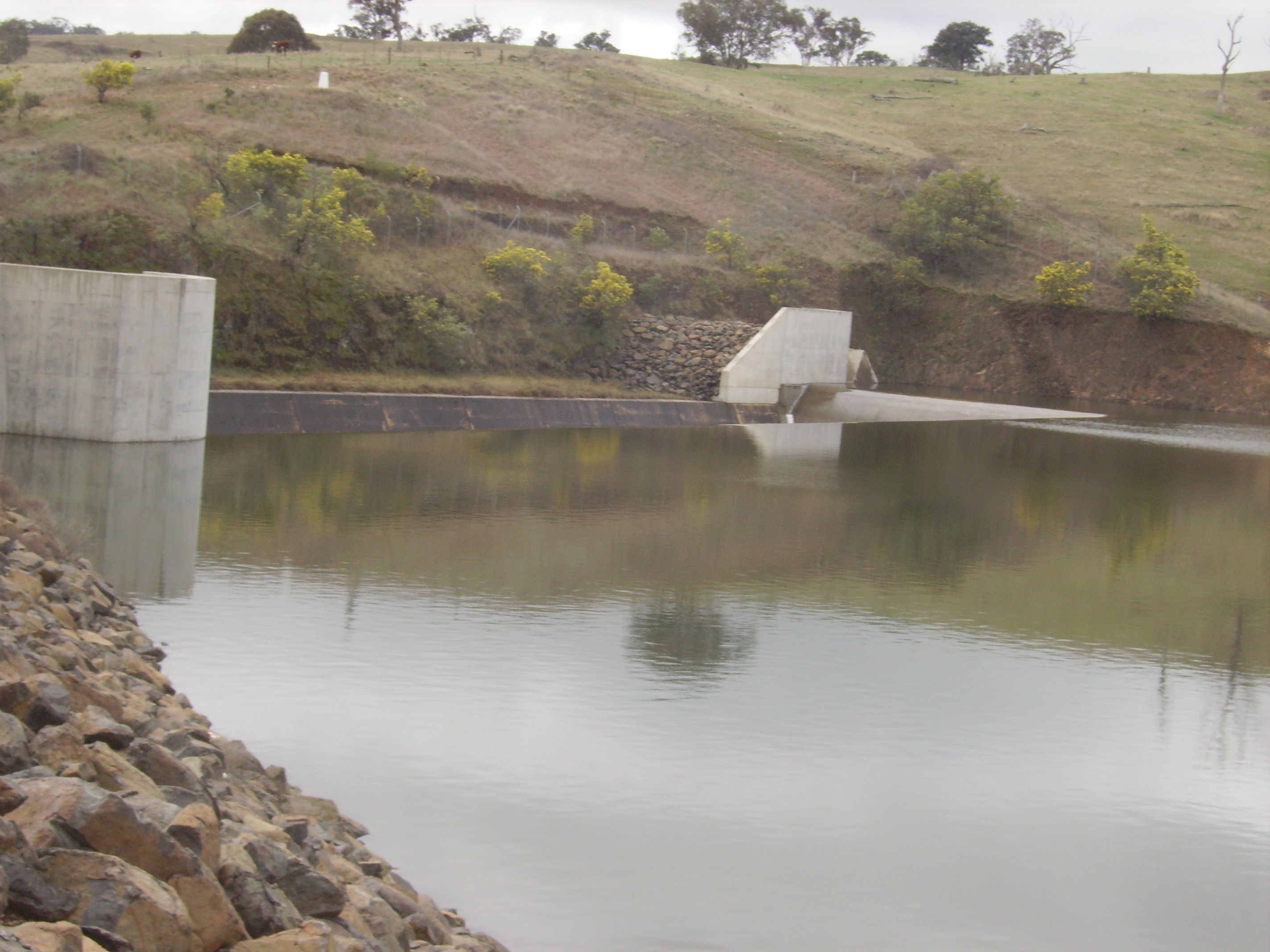
- Ben Chifley Dam

- Location of the Ben Chifley Dam in New South Wales
- Official name: Ben Chifley Dam
- Country: Australia
- Location: Central West, New South Wales
- Coordinates: 33°33′22″S 149°38′12″E
- Purpose: Water supply
- Status: Operational
- Construction began: 1948
- Opening date: 1956
- Operator: Bathurst Regional Council

Dam and spillways
- Type of dam: Embankment dam
- Impounds: Campbells River
- Height: 34.4 metres (113 ft)
- Length: 455 metres (1,493 ft)
- Width (base): 104 metres (341 ft)
- Spillways: Two
- Spillway type: Concrete side channel spillways, with a six bay auxiliary spillway
- Spillway capacity: 9,800 cubic metres per second (350,000 cu ft/s)

Reservoir
- Creates: Chifley Dam
- Total capacity: 30,800 megalitres (1,090×10^{6} cu ft)
- Active capacity: 26,000 megalitres (920×10^{6} cu ft)
- Inactive capacity: 4,800 megalitres (170×10^{6} cu ft)
- Catchment area: 960 square kilometres (370 sq mi)
- Surface area: 2.2 hectares (5.4 acres)
- Website www.bathurst.nsw.gov.au

Ben Chifley Dam, or Chifley Dam, is a rock and earth-fill embankment dam across the Campbells River in the central west region of New South Wales, Australia. The main purpose of the dam is to supply potable water to the city of Bathurst.

The dam is named in honour of Ben Chifley, a former Prime Minister of Australia, Member for Macquarie and resident of Bathurst.

== Location and features ==
The dam is located 17 kilometres (11 mi) upstream of Bathurst. Water is released into the Campbells River which flows into the Macquarie River before being captured at the water treatment facility at Gorman's Hill, a suburb of Bathurst.

The dam wall is 34.4 metres (113 ft) high and 455 metres (1,493 ft) long and holds back 30,800 megalitres (1,090×10^{6} cu ft) of water when at full capacity. The surface area of the reservoir is 2.2 hectares (5.4 acres) and the catchment area is 960 square kilometres (370 sq mi). The 455 metres (1,493 ft) long uncontrolled side-channel concrete spillway and six plug auxiliary fuse plug spillway has a discharge capacity of 9,800 cubic metres per second (350,000 cu ft/s). With an average daily inflow of around 35 megalitres (1.2×10^{6} cu ft) per day, as at April 2013, filtered water consumption averaged 18.9 megalitres (670×10^{3} cu ft), with a further 8.4 megalitres (300×10^{3} cu ft) of treated water returned to the Macquarie River.

=== History ===
Construction of Ben Chifley Dam started in 1948 and was completed eight years later. It was officially opened by the Premier of New South Wales, Joseph Cahill on 10 November 1956. The dam then succeeded Winburndale Dam as the potable-water supply for Bathurst. Winburndale Dam had been built in 1934 with an expected life of 20 years. Since completion of Ben Chifley Dam, Winburndale has been used to supply raw water for park watering and industrial use.

Plans to upgrade the Ben Chifley Dam commenced in 1989 after it was realised it did not meet the New South Wales Dam Safety Committee's safety recommendations and could fail in the event of a severe flood. A flood in August 1998, the worst recorded in 175 years, caused water to run over the spillway at a depth of 2.74 metres (9.0 ft), just 0.1 metres (0.33 ft) below the level at which the wall was expected to fail. An evacuation plan was implemented downstream.

Construction to upgrade the dam started in 1999. The top of the wall was raised by 5.4 metres (18 ft) and the spillway was extended by 30 metres (98 ft), increasing the dam's capacity from 16,000 megalitres (570×10^{6} cu ft) to 30,800 megalitres (1,090×10^{6} cu ft).

== Gallery ==
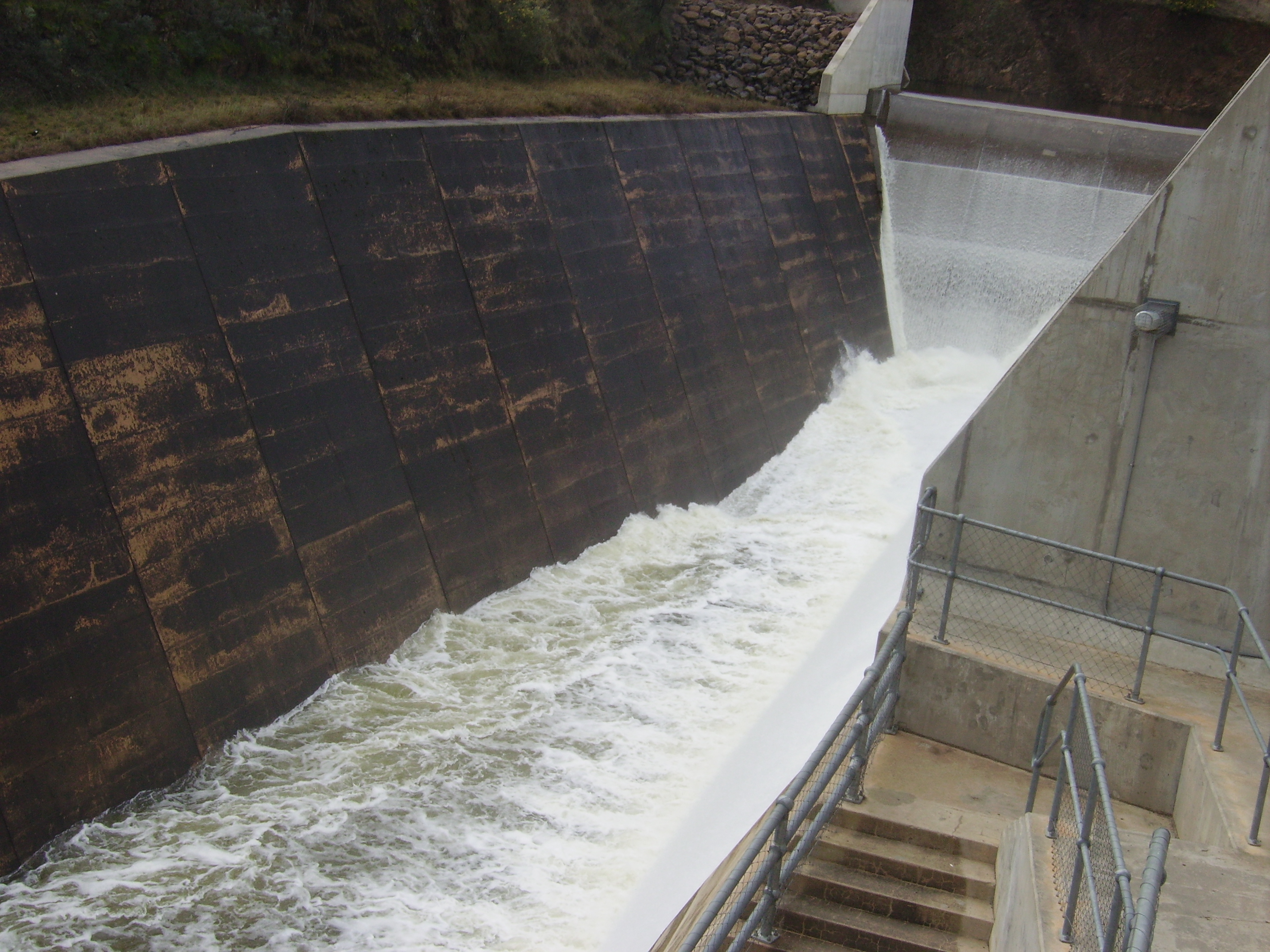
Water flowing over the upgraded spillway

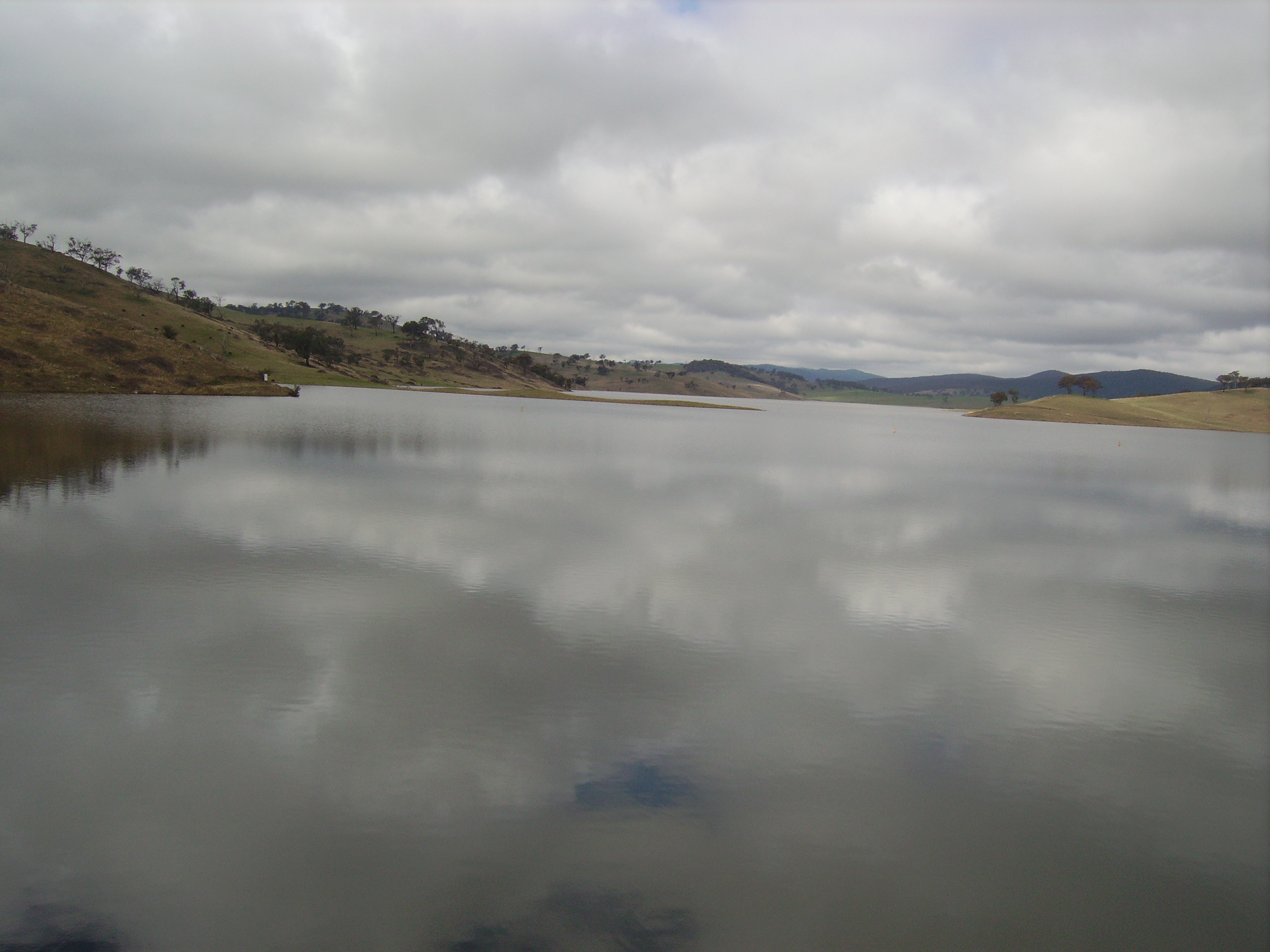
The reservoir impounded by Ben Chifley Dam at full capacity

== See also ==
- List of dams and reservoirs in New South Wales
- Winburndale Dam
