= Emile Serisier Bridge =

Bridge in Dubbo

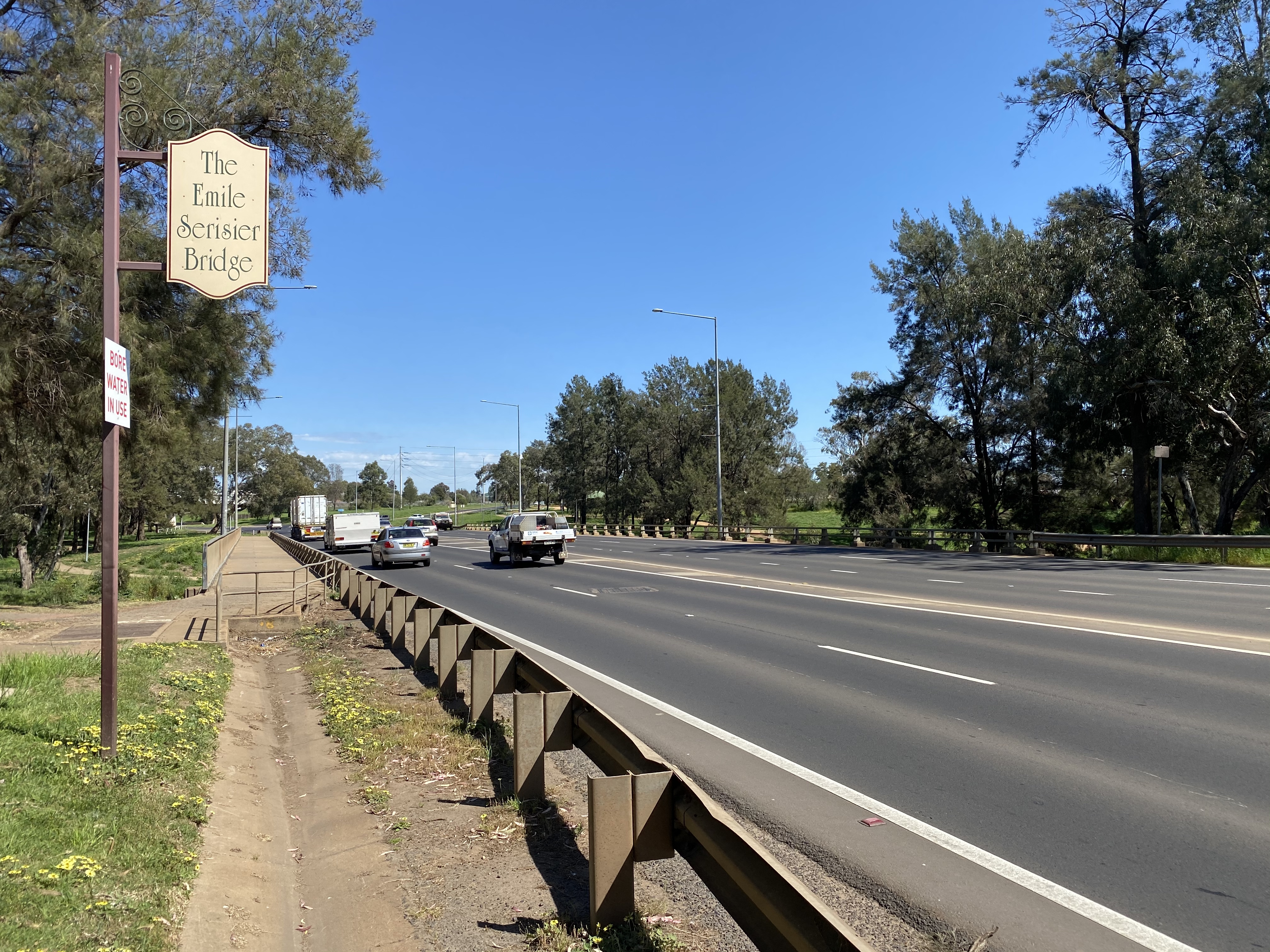
- Eastern end of the Emile Serisier Bridge
- Coordinates: 32°14′34″S 148°35′59″E
- Carries: Newell Highway: Motor vehicles; Bicycles; Pedestrians
- Crosses: Macquarie River
- Locale: Dubbo, New South Wales
- Named for: Jean Emile Serisier

Characteristics
- Material: Concrete
- Total length: 90 metres (300 ft)
- Height: 257.6 metres (845 ft) AHD
- No. of lanes: 4

History
- Construction end: 1986

Location
- Interactive map of Emile Serisier Bridge

The Emile Serisier Bridge is a low-level, four-lane road bridge which crosses the Macquarie River in Dubbo, New South Wales, Australia. The bridge carries the Newell Highway, a major freight corridor, and along with the LH Ford Bridge on the Mitchell Highway makes Dubbo a major freight hub.

The bridge is prone to flooding, being only 257.6 metres on the Australian Height Datum and lower than the 1-in-10-year recurrence interval flood level of 259.97 metres AHD for the Macquarie River at Dubbo. When the bridge is closed due to flooding, traffic is diverted to the two-lane LH Ford Bridge, which can result in congestion and long travel delays due to capacity issues.

The Aunty Pearl Gibbs Bridge was constructed north of the Emile Serisier from 2022-2026 as part of a $263.2 million upgrade package for the Newell Highway to reroute heavy traffic away from Dubbo and provide a higher level crossing for flood events. Once opened this bridge will carry heavy freight traffic over the river instead of the Emile Serisier Bridge.
