= Bridle path =

Path that can be used by people riding horses

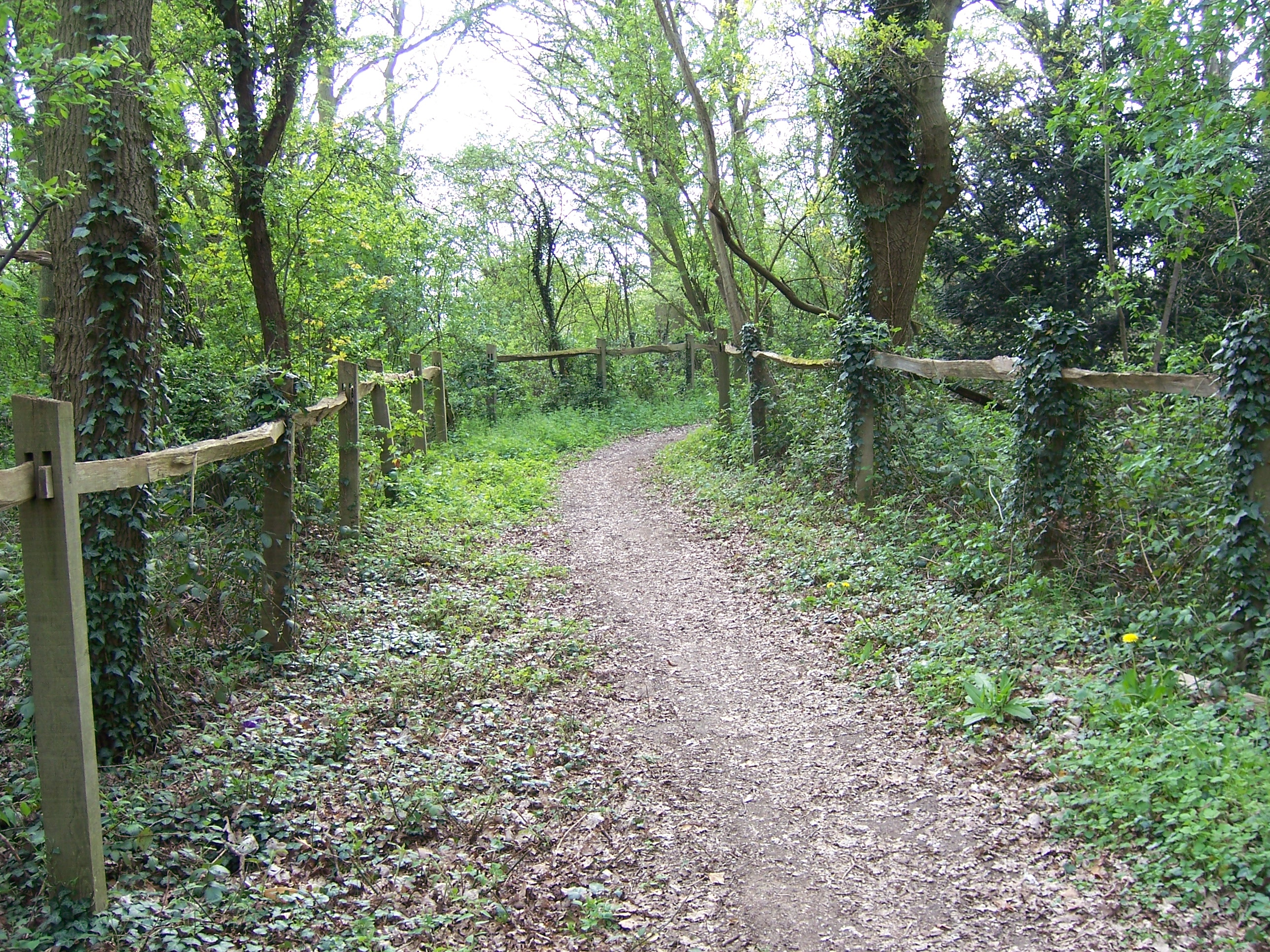
Bridleway in Hillingdon, England

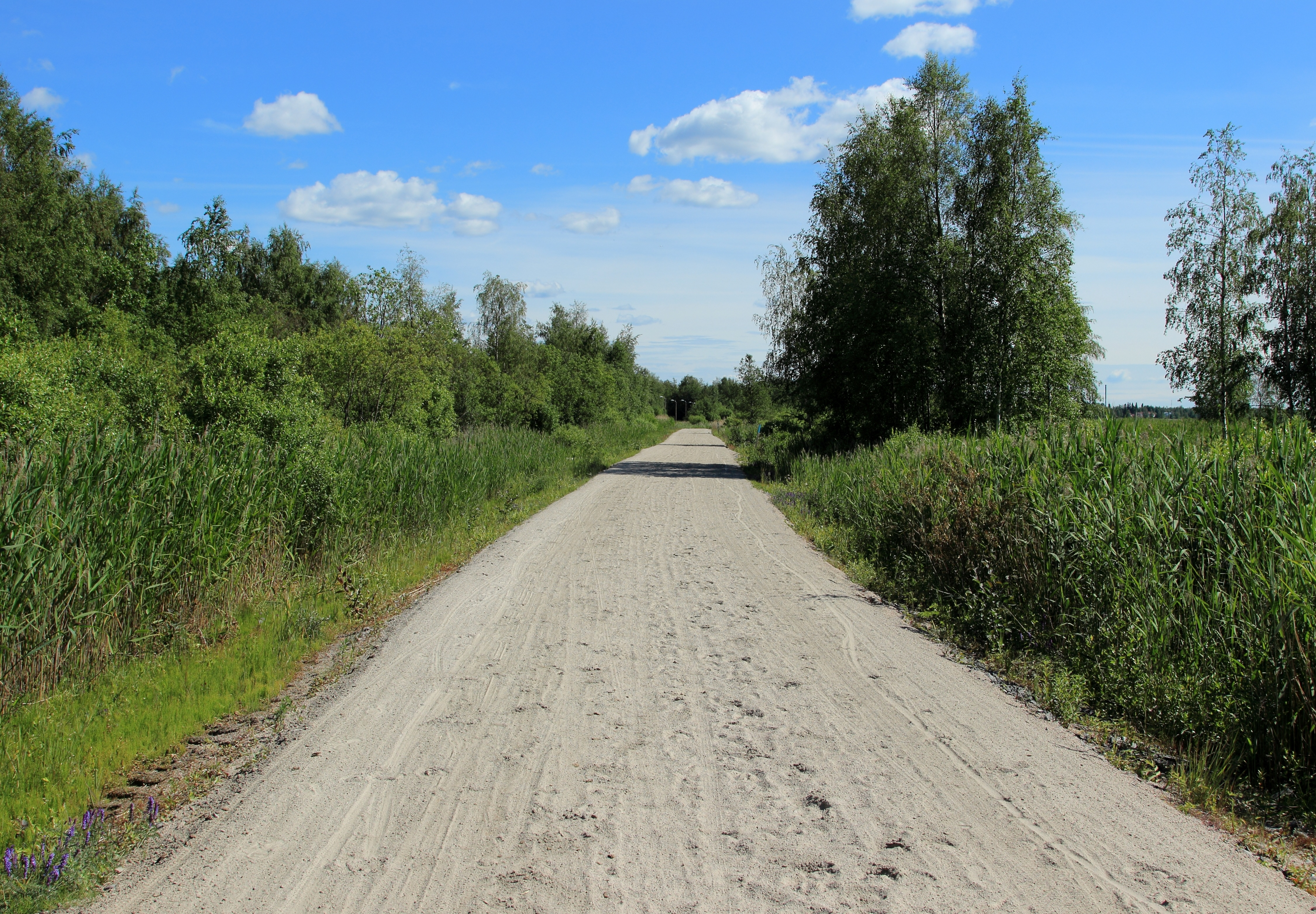
A horse riding path in Oulu, Finland

Marker for the National Horse Trail in Australia.

A bridle path, also bridleway, equestrian trail, horse riding path, ride, bridle road, or horse trail, is a trail or a thoroughfare that is used by people riding on horses. Trails originally created for use by horses often now serve a wider range of users, including equestrians, hikers, and cyclists. Such paths are either impassable for motorized vehicles, or vehicles are banned. The laws relating to allowable uses vary from country to country.

In industrialized countries, bridle paths are now primarily used for recreation. However, they are still important transportation routes in other areas. For example, they are the main method of traveling to mountain villages in Lesotho.

In England and Wales a bridle path now refers to a right of way which can be legally used by horse riders in addition to walkers, and since 1968, by cyclists. A "ride" is another term used for a bridleway: "a path or track, esp. one through a wood, usually made for riding on horseback" (Oxford English Dictionary).

In the US, the term bridle path is used colloquially for trails or paths used primarily for people making day treks on horses, and usually used only on the East Coast, whereas out West the equivalent term is trail. The term bridleway is rarely used in the U.S.. Horses are usually presumed allowed to use trails in America unless specifically banned, although rules differ among locations.

In some countries long-distance multi-use trails have been created, including the Bicentennial National Trail in Australia, one of the longest marked multi-use trails in the world, stretching 5,330 kilometres. Rail trails can often be used by equestrians.

== In the United Kingdom ==
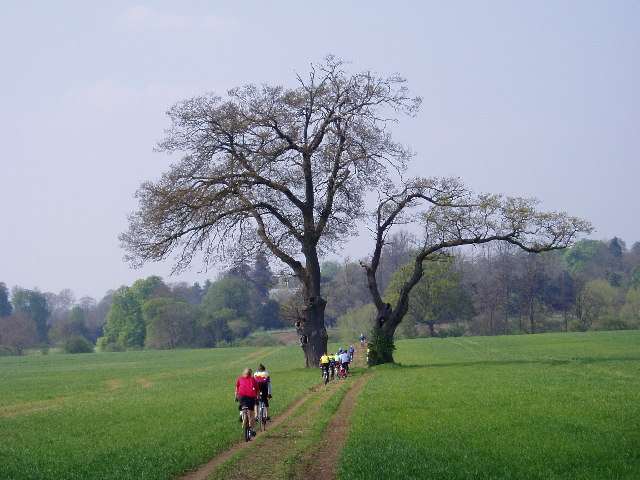
Cyclists on a bridleway in England

=== England and Wales ===
In England and Wales a bridleway is one class of "a way over which the public has a right of way on foot and a right of way on horseback or leading a horse, with or without a right to drive animals along the way." Although Section 30 of the Countryside Act 1968 permits the riding of bicycles on public bridleways, the act says that it "shall not create any obligation to facilitate the use of the bridleway by cyclists". Thus the right to cycle exists even though it may be difficult to exercise on occasion, especially in winter. Cyclists using a bridleway are obliged to give way to other users on foot or horseback pursuant to the Countryside Act 1968.

In London's Hyde Park the sand-covered avenue of Rotten Row is maintained as a bridleway and forms part of Hyde Park's South Ride. It is convenient for the Household Cavalry, stabled nearby at Hyde Park Barracks in Knightsbridge, to exercise their horses.

Although bridleways are shown on Ordnance Survey maps, only the definitive map of the area (controlled by the county council) lists every legal bridle path.

In total there are over 76,000 separate bridleway routes with a total length of over 25,000 miles (40,000 km) in England and Wales.

==== Long-distance bridle trails ====
A number of long-distance multi-use trails have been created in England, including three National Trails: the Pennine Bridleway, 192 km (119 miles), The Ridgeway, 139 km (86 miles), and South Downs Way, 160 km (99 miles). The British Horse Society has promoted long-distance routes for horse riders known as bridleroutes, incorporating bridleways, byways and minor roads.

=== Scotland ===
The Land Reform (Scotland) Act 2003 specifically establishes a right to be on land for recreational, educational and certain other purposes and a right to cross land. Access rights apply to any non-motorised activities, including horse-riding but only if they are exercised responsibly, as specified in the Scottish Outdoor Access Code.

However, there is a lack of legally asserted public rights of way in Scotland, particularly for horse riding and cycling. Rights of way in Scotland mostly provide access for walkers, and only rarely for horse riders.

== Europe ==
=== Netherlands ===
In the Netherlands a bridleway (ruiterpad) is a special sand path for equestrians, largely free from other traffic, so that a rider does not inconvenience other users and vice versa. They are indicated with a sign and are both narrow and wide. Traffic is sometimes permitted on wide paths.

== North America ==
=== Canada ===
It is possible to ride some sections of the Trans Canada Trail, especially in Quebec

=== United States ===
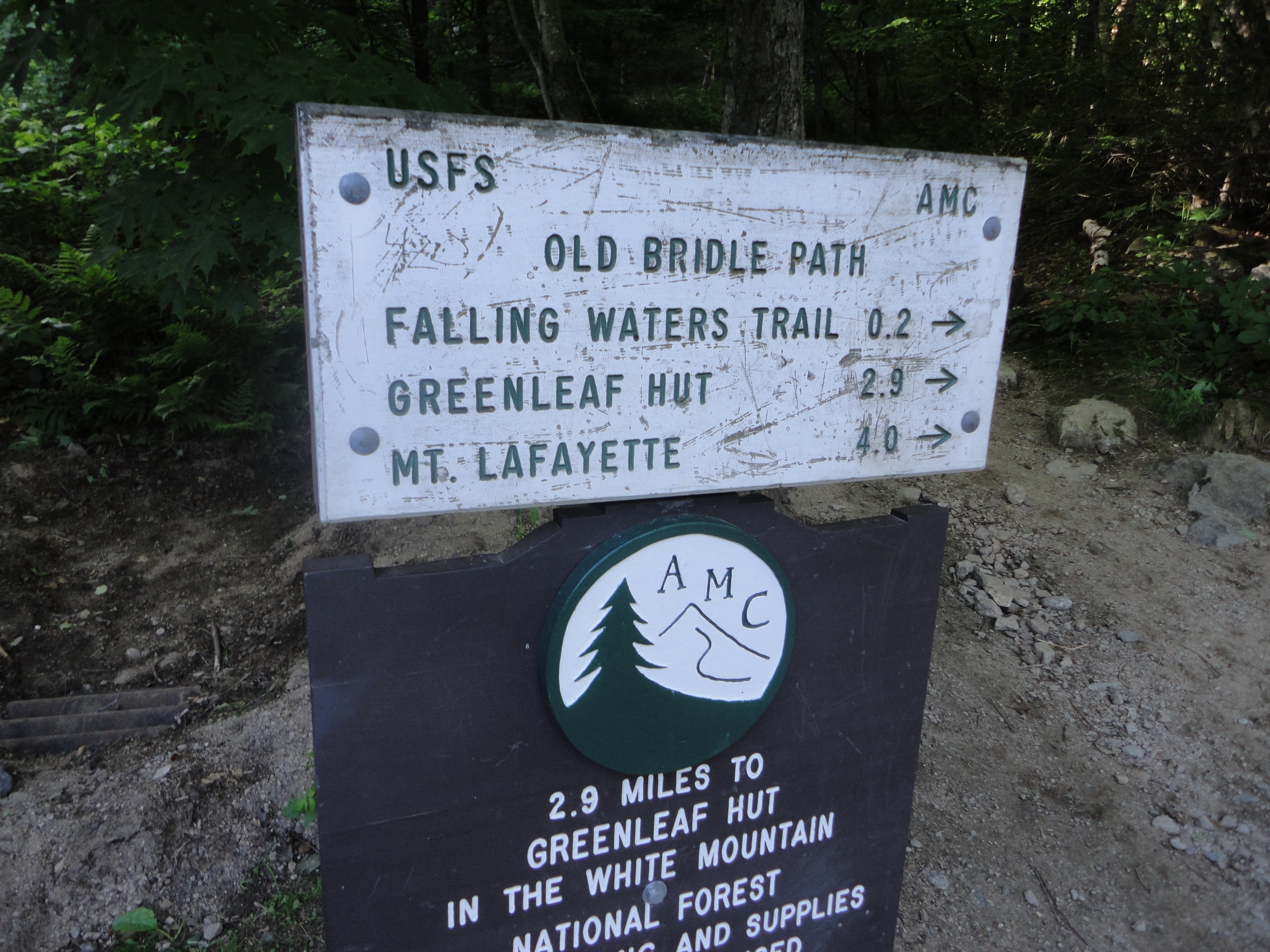
Sign for Old Bridle Path trail in New Hampshire, U.S. - which no longer allows horses.

The United States has few if any formal designations for bridle paths, though horses are generally allowed on most state and federal trails, roads and public routes except where specifically restricted. Often, horses under saddle are subject to the same regulations as pedestrians or hikers where those requirements differ from those for cyclists. In most states, horses are classified as livestock and thus restricted from areas such as the right of way of the interstate highway system, though generally permitted to travel along the side of other roadways, especially in rural areas.

Urban bridle paths exist in Philadelphia's Fairmount Park (most notably Forbidden Drive along the Wissahickon Creek) and New York City's Central Park

Some trails managed by the U. S. Forest Service and other governmental entities may restrict access of horses, or restrict access during certain times of the year. For example, horses are allowed on the American Discovery Trail, which crosses the country, but only on specific sections of the Appalachian Trail. Access to trails and pathways on private land is generally left to the discretion of the landowner, subject to the general trespass laws of each of the 50 states.

== Australia ==
The longest bridle trail in Australia is the Bicentennial National Trail, of 5,330 kilometres length, running from Cooktown, Queensland, to Healesville, Victoria. There are also some historic bridle trails, now not commonly used by horse traffic, such as The Bridle Track, the Six Foot Track, and The Corn Trail.

== Rail trails ==
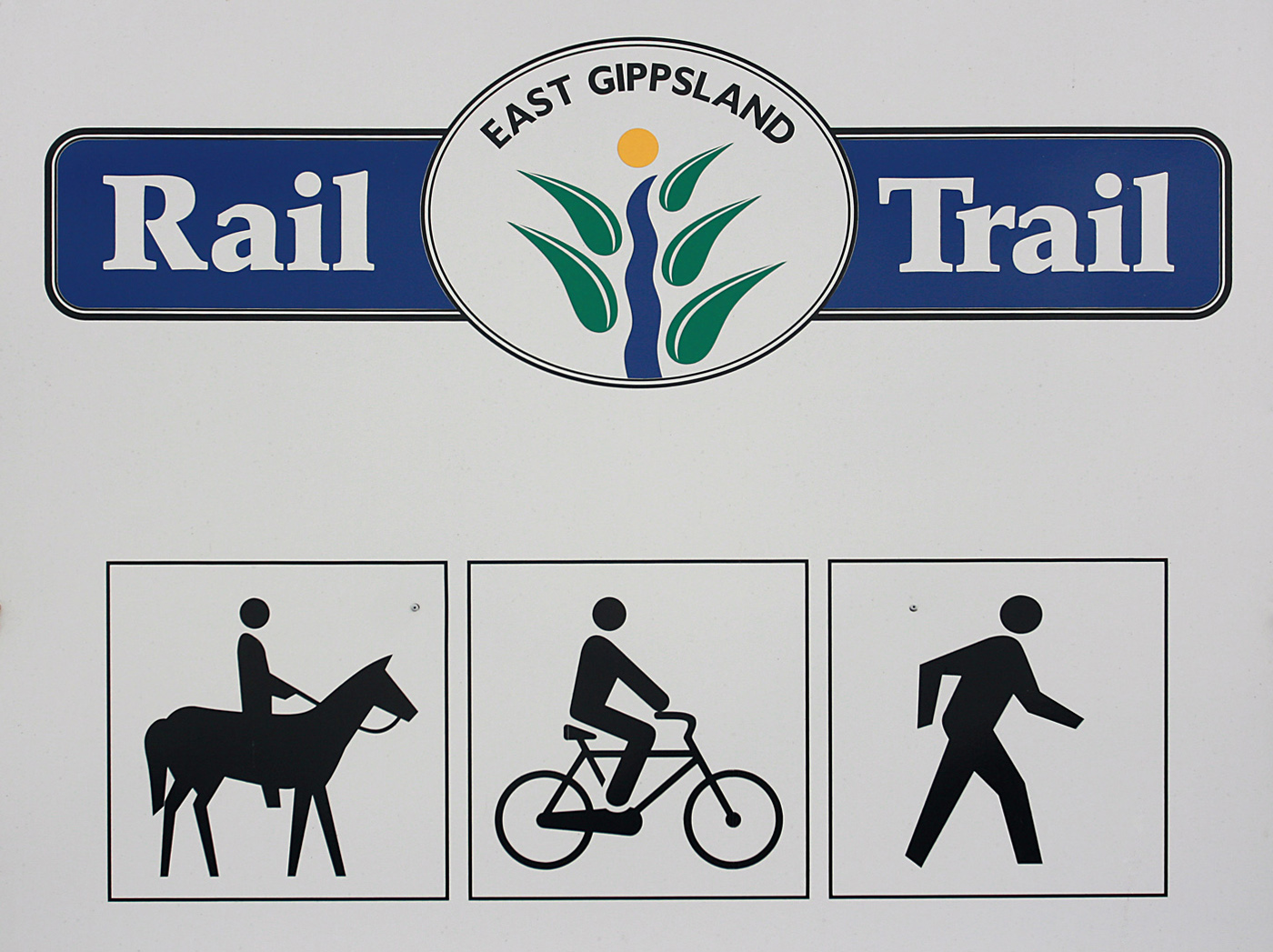
East Gippsland Rail Trail signage in Victoria, Australia indicating the shared trail usage

Rail trails/paths are shared-use paths that make use of abandoned railway corridors. They can be used for walking, cycling, and often horse riding as well. The following description comes from Australia, but is applicable equally to other rail trails that exist throughout the world.

Following the route of the railways, they cut through hills, under roads, over embankments and across gullies and creeks. Apart from being great places to walk, cycle or horse ride, rail trails are linear conservation corridors protecting native plants and animals. They often link remnant vegetation in farming areas and contain valuable flora and fauna habitat. Wineries and other attractions are near many trails as well as B&B's and other great places to stay.

Most trails have a gravel or dirt surface suitable for walking, mountain bikes and horses.

== See also ==
- Equestrian use of roadways
- Green lane
- List of rail trails
- Long-distance trail
- Right of way (transit)
- Right of way (disambiguation)
- Trail#Equestrian
- Trail riding
