= Campbells River =

River in New South Wales, Australia

Coordinates: 33°42′S 149°37′E

Campbells River Campbell River
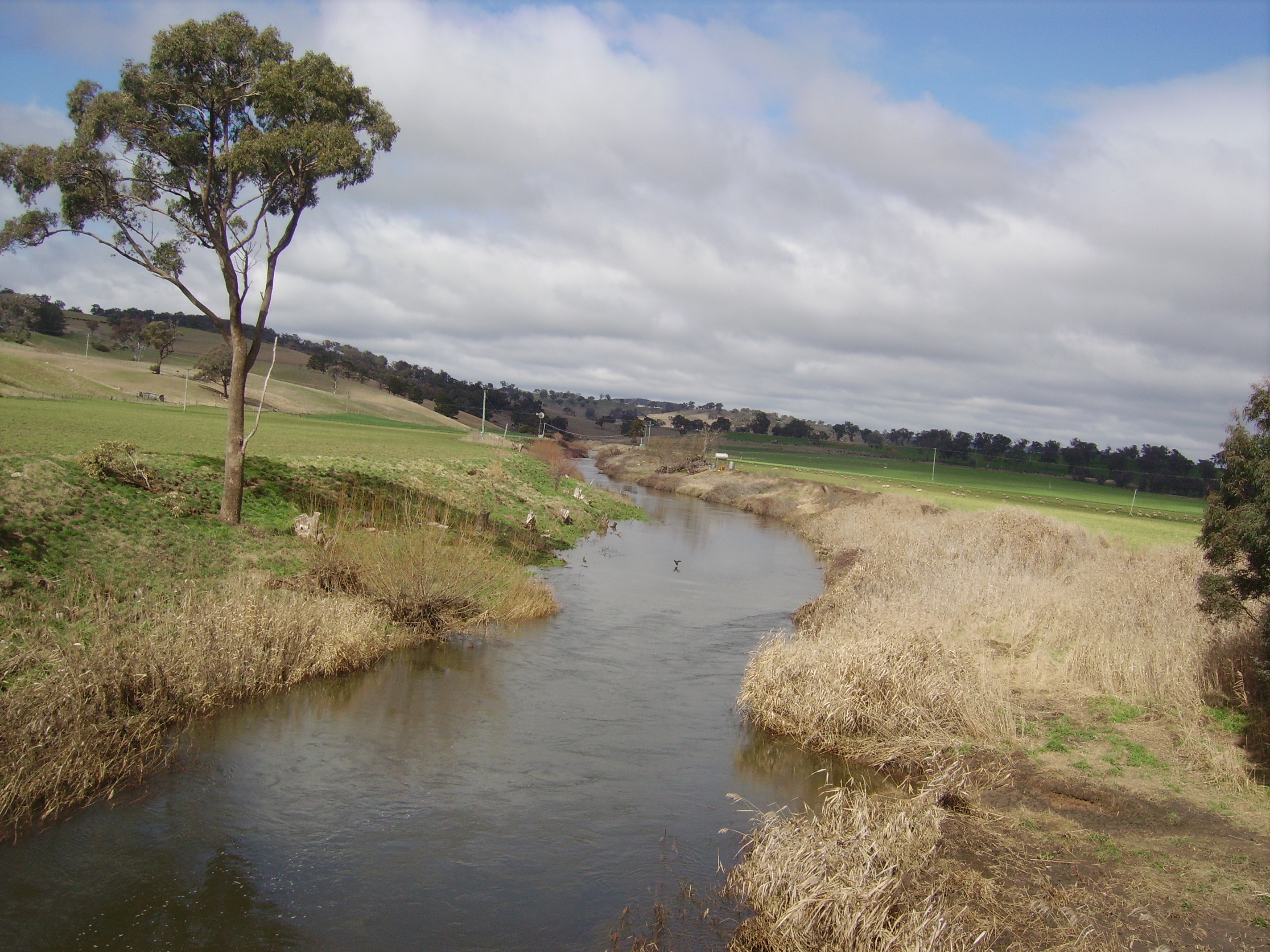
- Campbells River flowing under the O'Connell Plains Road bridge at The Lagoon, near Bathurst
- Etymology: In honour of Elizabeth Macquarie

Location
- Country: Australia
- State: New South Wales
- IBRA: South Eastern Highlands
- District: Central West
- Municipalities: Oberon, Bathurst

Physical characteristics
- Source
  - location: near Black Springs
  - elevation: 1,180 m (3,870 ft)
- Mouth: Fish River
  - location: near Bathurst
  - elevation: 706 m (2,316 ft)
- Length: 81.6 km (50.7 mi)

Basin features
- River system: Upper Macquarie catchment, Murray–Darling basin
- Tributaries
  - left: Davy's Creek, Dirthole Creek, Gilmandyke Creek, Peppers Creek
  - right: Racecourse Creek, Sewells Creek, Spring Creek, Swallowsnest Creek, Walbrook Creek, Wisemans Creek
- Reservoir: Ben Chifley Dam

Campbells River, a perennial stream that is part of the Upper Macquarie catchment within the Murray–Darling basin, is located in the central–western region of New South Wales, Australia.

The river rises on the western slopes of the Great Dividing Range about 6.4 kilometres (4.0 mi) south of Black Springs. It flows generally north by west towards its confluence with the Fish River 9 kilometres (5.6 mi) south–south–east of Bathurst to become the Macquarie River; descending 473 metres (1,552 ft) over its 82 kilometres (51 mi) course.

The river is impounded by Ben Chifley Dam upstream of Bathurst and carries water released from the dam for Bathurst's potable water supply.

== See also ==
- List of rivers of Australia
