= Winburndale Dam =

Dam in Central West, New South Wales, Australia

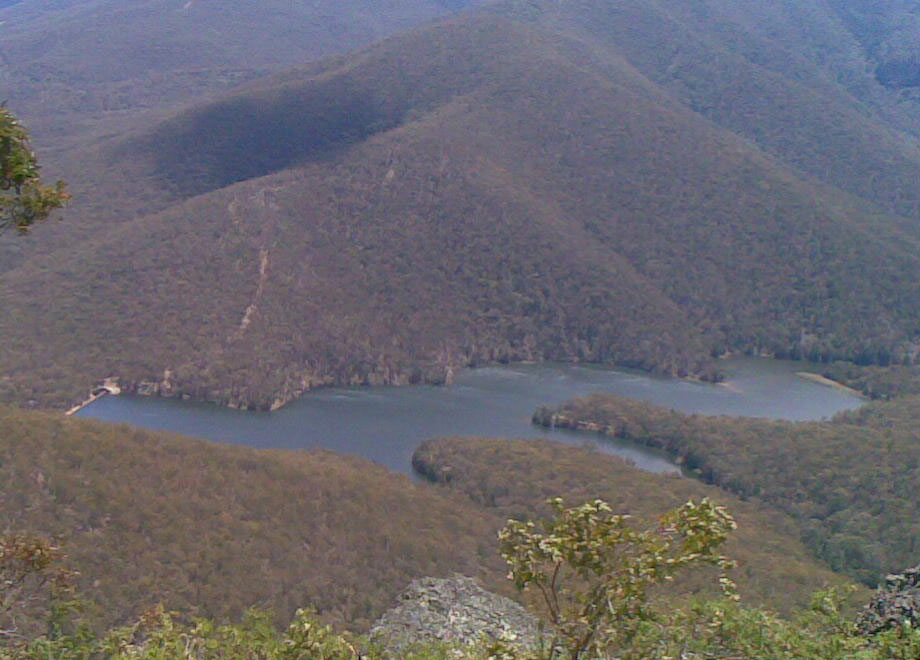
- An aerial view of the reservoir in 2009

- Location of the dam in New South Wales
- Interactive map of Winburndale Dam
- Country: Australia
- Location: Central West, New South Wales
- Coordinates: 33°23′23″S 149°46′37″E
- Purpose: Industrial water supply
- Status: Operational
- Construction began: 1931
- Opening date: 1934
- Operator: Bathurst Regional Council

Dam and spillways
- Type of dam: Gravity and embankment
- Impounds: Winburndale Rivulet
- Height (foundation): 22 m (72 ft)
- Length: 233 m (764 ft)
- Dam volume: 10×10^{3} m^{3} (350×10^{3} cu ft)
- Spillway type: Uncontrolled
- Spillway capacity: 1,400 m^{3}/s (49,000 cu ft/s)

Reservoir
- Total capacity: 1,700 ML (1,400 acre⋅ft)
- Catchment area: 88 ha (220 acres)
- Surface area: 28 ha (69 acres)
- Website bathurst.nsw.gov.au

The Winburndale Dam is a concrete gravity and earth-filled embankment dam across the Winburndale Rivulet, located in the central west of New South Wales, Australia. The dam is situated within the Winburndale Nature Reserve, 19 kilometres (12 mi) east of Bathurst, New South Wales; and public access to the dam is prohibited.

The dam is 22 metres (72 ft) high and 233 metres (764 ft) long. The resultant 1,700-megalitre (1,400 acre⋅ft) reservoir draws from an 88-square-kilometre (34 sq mi) catchment area. The reservoir was a source for the supply of raw water to Bathurst for the watering of parks and industrial use.

== History ==
After extensive and lengthy investigations of possible dam locations, construction of the Winburndale Dam began in 1931. It was constructed using Unemployment Relief funds during the Great Depression. As part of the construction of Winburndale Dam, a 21-kilometre (13 mi) gravity-fed wood stave pipeline was built from the dam to Bathurst.

== See also ==
- List of dams and reservoirs in Australia
- Ben Chifley Dam
