= Aunty Pearl Gibbs Bridge =

- Coordinates: 32°13′58.7″S 148°36′13.2″E
- Carries: Newell Highway: Motor vehicles
- Crosses: Macquarie River
- Locale: Dubbo, New South Wales
- Named for: Pearl Gibbs
- Owner: Transport for NSW

Characteristics
- Design: Prestressed concrete girder bridge
- Material: Concrete
- Total length: 662.59 metres
- Width: 14 metres (overall); 13 metres (between barriers)
- No. of spans: 20
- Piers in water: 2
- No. of lanes: 2 3.5 metre lanes
- Design life: 100 years

History
- Constructed by: Abergeldie Complex Infrastucture
- Construction cost: $263.2 million (total upgrade budget)
- Opened: 14 November 2026

Location
- Interactive map of Aunty Pearl Gibbs Bridge

The Aunty Pearl Gibbs Bridge is a two-lane road bridge carrying the Newell Highway across the Macquarie-Wambuul River and its floodplains near Dubbo, New South Wales, Australia. The 660-metre (2,170 ft) multi-span concrete bridge was constructed as part of the Newell Highway Upgrade to reduce traffic congestion in Dubbo and provide a high-level river crossing during flood events. The bridge is named in honour of Pearl Gibbs, an Aboriginal rights activist who lived in Dubbo for much of her life.

== Construction and design ==
The bridge is part of a $263.2 million infrastructure project jointly funded by the Australian and New South Wales governments. It includes approximately 2.2 kilometres (1.4 mi) of new highway and upgrades to surrounding intersections and adjoining roads.

Early works commenced in August 2022 with preparatory intersection upgrades. Abergeldie Complex Infrastructure was awarded the construction contract in late 2022.

The bridge consists of 20 spans supported by concrete piers, with its construction involving 89 piles and over 120 precast concrete girders supporting the approximately 5,000-tonne (5,500-ton) bridge deck.

== Naming ==
The bridge is named in honour of Pearl Gibbs, an Aboriginal rights activist who lived in Dubbo for much of her adult life. Gibbs was involved with the Aborigines Progressive Association and various protest events including the 1938 Day of Mourning, and was the first Aboriginal woman to speak on Australian radio.

The name was selected following community consultation undertaken by Transport for NSW and Dubbo Regional Council. Four names were shortlisted: Wambuul, Nguluway, Bunglegumbie and Aunty Pearl Gibbs. Despite Dubbo Regional Council recommending the name James Samuels bridge (the first mayor of Dubbo), Transport for NSW officially announced the name Aunty Pearl Gibbs on 2 December 2025.

== See also ==
- L.H. Ford Bridge
- Emile Serisier Bridge
- Macquarie River railway bridge, Dubbo
