= Winburndale Rivulet =

Coordinates: 33°12′S 149°34′E

Location
- Country: Australia

Physical characteristics
- Source
  - location: New South Wales

The Winburndale Rivulet or Winburndale Creek is a stream in Roxburgh County, in the Bathurst Region in the state of New South Wales in Australia. It begins at the junction of the Kirkconnell and Mitchells Creeks to the West of Sunny Corner, and flows in a westerly direction until it meets the Macquarie River. It is around 60 mi (97 km) long.

The stream was named by NSW Governor Lachlan Macquarie on 6 May 1815.

It is dammed to the East of Bathurst by Winburndale Dam.

== See also ==
- List of rivers of Australia
