= L.H. Ford Bridge =

L. H. Ford Bridge
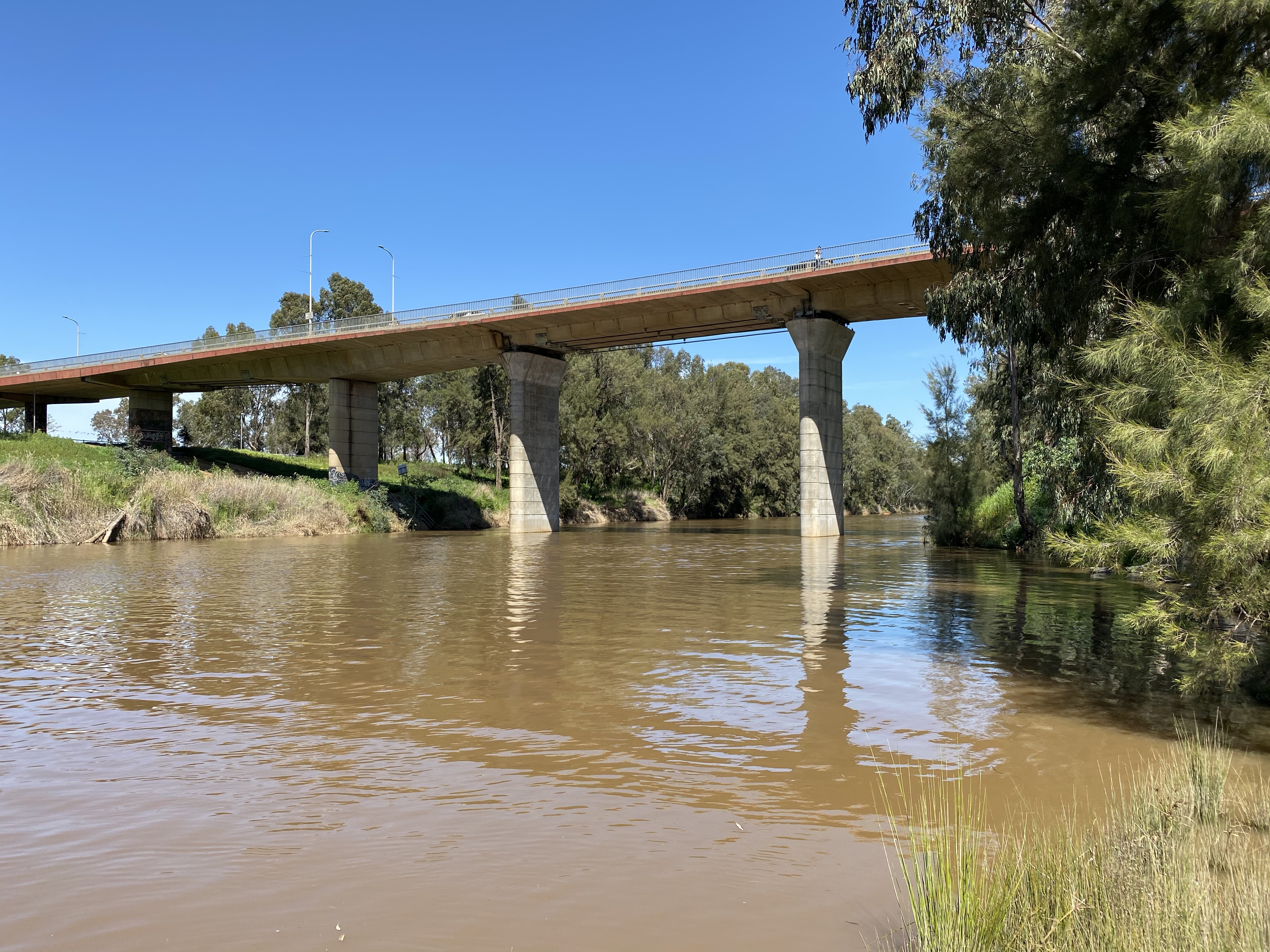
- LH Ford Bridge over the Macquarie River - Wambuul in September 2020
- Coordinates: 32°15′2.797″S 148°35′45.388″E
- Carries: Mitchell Highway: Motor vehicles; Bicycles; Pedestrians
- Crosses: Macquarie River
- Locale: Dubbo, New South Wales
- Named for: Les Ford
- Owner: Transport for NSW

Characteristics
- Material: Concrete
- Total length: 613 metres (2,011 ft)
- Piers in water: 2
- Load limit: 68.0 tonnes (66.9 long tons; 75.0 short tons)
- No. of lanes: 2
- Design life: 100 years

History
- Opened: 26 September 1969

Location
- Interactive map of L. H. Ford Bridge

The L.H. Ford Bridge is a concrete balanced cantilever bridge that carries the Mitchell Highway over the Macquarie River in Dubbo, New South Wales. It was officially open to traffic by the Minister for Local Government and Minister for Highways, Pat Morton on 26 September 1969 and named in honour of the former Mayor of Dubbo and Member of the New South Wales Parliament for Dubbo, Les Ford. Work commenced in 2018 to strengthen and extend the life of the bridge, with the project completed in 2020.

== History and condition ==
L.H. Ford Bridge was built in the 1960s to replace an old wooden bridge over the Macquarie River - Wambuul, at the time of its completion, the bridge was the fourth longest highway bridge in NSW at 613 m (2,011 ft) in length. Since its opening, the centre span of the bridge had significantly sagged, reducing the lifespan, causing a noticeable dip and increased maintenance costs. In November 2018 work commenced on strengthening the centre span of the bridge with the construction of two piers in the river to support the centre span and each end of the cantilever fitted with external post tensioning cables, extending the life of the bridge and to allow for heavy vehicles up to 68 tonnes, which was completed in 2020.

== See also ==
- Aunty Pearl Gibbs Bridge
