= Macquarie River =

River in New South Wales, Australia

Macquarie
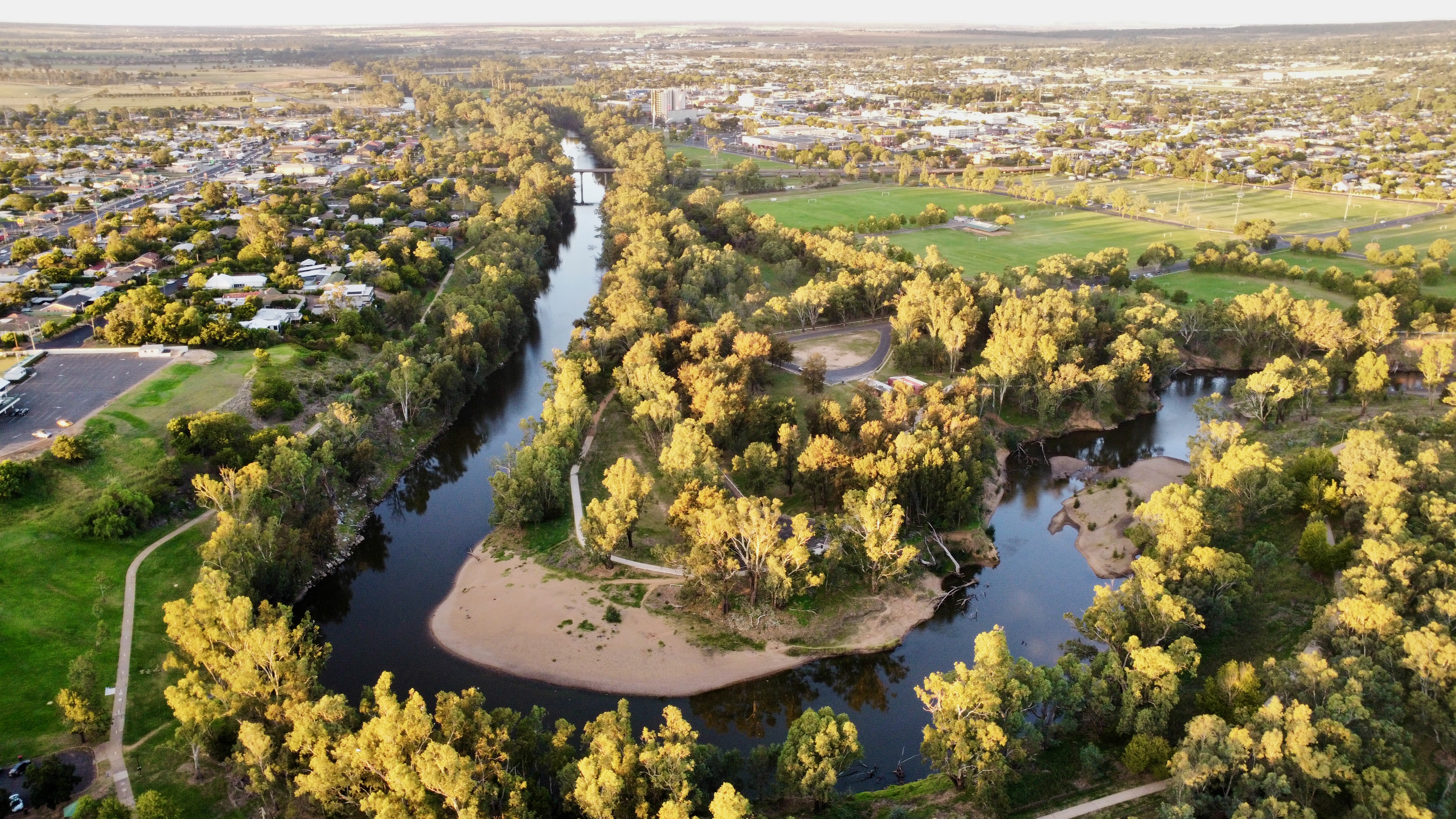
- A bend in the Wambuul Macquarie River in Dubbo in April 2026
- Etymology: Lachlan Macquarie; Wambuul means winding river
- Native name: Wambuul (Wiradjuri)

Location
- Country: Australia
- State: New South Wales
- Region: Central West, New South Wales
- City: Bathurst, Wellington, Dubbo, Narromine, and Warren

Physical characteristics
- Source: Campbells River
  - location: near Oberon
  - elevation: 671 m (2,201 ft)
- 2nd source: Fish River
  - location: near Oberon
- Mouth: Barwon River
  - location: Macquarie Marshes
  - coordinates: 30°55′55″S 147°37′44″E
- Length: 960 km (600 mi)
- Basin size: 74,000 km^{2} (29,000 sq mi)

Basin features
- River system: Murray-Darling basin
- Tributaries
  - left: Fish River, Bell River, Little River
  - right: Turon River, Cudgegong River, Talbragar River
- Bridges: Bathurst: Railway; Evans; Denison; Gordon Edgell; Rankens; Wellington: Railway; Mitchell Highway; Temporary pontoon; Guerie: Scabbing Flat; Dubbo: Rawsonville; Dundullimal Railway; LH Ford; Railway; Emile Serisier; Newell Highway Bridge (Under Construction 2023); Troy; Trangie: Gin Gin; Warren: Sturt; Bells
- Reservoir: Lake Burrendong

The Macquarie River or Wambuul is part of the Macquarie–Barwon catchment within the Murray–Darling basin, is one of the main inland rivers in New South Wales, Australia.

The river rises in the central highlands of New South Wales near the town of Oberon and travels generally northwest past the towns of Bathurst, Wellington, Dubbo, Narromine, and Warren to the Macquarie Marshes. The Macquarie Marshes then drain into the Darling River via the lower Barwon River.

Lake Burrendong is a large reservoir with capacity of 1,190,000 megalitres (42,000×10^{6} cu ft) located near Wellington which impounds the waters of the Wambuul Macquarie River and its tributaries the Cudgegong River and the Turon River for flood control and irrigation.

== Name ==
The Wiradjuri are the people of the three rivers, Wambuul, Kalare (Lachlan) and the Murrumbidjeri (Murrumbidgee). Wambuul means winding river, and included the tributary Fish River. It has also been spelt Wambool.

The river was first documented for the British crown near Bathurst by European explorer, George Evans in 1812, who named the river in honour of Lieutenant-Colonel Lachlan Macquarie, who served as Governor of the Colony of New South Wales from 1810 to 1821.

In December 2021, Wambuul was recognised as an official dual name by the Geographical Names Board of New South Wales after support from a local movement and the Bathurst Local Aboriginal Land Council. Either or both names may be used and both are given equal status.

== Geography ==
From its origin the Wambuul Macquarie River flows for 960 kilometres (600 mi) and drops around 517 metres (1,696 ft) over its length. Lake Burrendong at 346 metres (1,135 ft) is the only dam along the length of the river. Windamere Dam, on the Cudgegong River, is operated in conjunction with Burrendong.

=== Sources ===
The Macquarie River starts below the locality of White Rock near Bathurst at an elevation of 671 metres (2,201 ft). It is a combination of two water systems which are the overflow from Chifley Dam which is fed by the Campbells River, and the Fish River which flows into and out of the Oberon Dam.

=== Tributaries ===
A number of rivers and creeks flow into the Wambuul Macquarie River, with descending elevation as follows:

Tributary	Elevation at junction
Fish River	670 metres (2,200 ft)
Queen Charlotte's Creek	655 metres (2,149 ft)
Winburndale Rivulet	484 metres (1,588 ft)
Turon River	406 metres (1,332 ft)
Tambaroora Creek	398 metres (1,306 ft)
Lewis Ponds Creek	
Pyramul Creek	360 metres (1,180 ft)
Curragurra Creek	351 metres (1,152 ft)
Cudgegong River	342 metres (1,122 ft)
Triamble Creek	342 metres (1,122 ft)
Wuuluman Creek	302 metres (991 ft)
Bell River	285 metres (935 ft)
Little River	271 metres (889 ft)
Wambangalong Creek	265 metres (869 ft)
Cumboogle Creek	263 metres (863 ft)
Talbragar River	257 metres (843 ft)
Mogriguy Creek	257 metres (843 ft)
Whylandra Creek	255 metres (837 ft)
Coolbaggie Creek	246 metres (807 ft)
Brummagen Creek	239 metres (784 ft)
Gin Gin Creek	217 metres (712 ft)
Greenhide Creek	209 metres (686 ft)
Bulla Bulla Creek	202 metres (663 ft)
Five Mile Cowal	187 metres (614 ft)
Marebone Break	184 metres (604 ft)
Bulgeraga Creek	179 metres (587 ft)
Oxley Break	171 metres (561 ft)

=== Communities and bridge crossings along the river ===
Location	Bridge name	Comments/use	Image	Notes
Bathurst	Railway bridge, Main Western line	This bridge served the Main Western and Broken Hill railway lines from 1876 to c. 2005. The wrought iron lattice girder bridge was constructed to the design of John Whitton, the Chief Engineer of the New South Wales Government Railways, and is listed on the New South Wales Heritage Register. The railway bridges at Wellington and Dubbo (see below) are to the same design. A concrete girder bridge replaced the 1870 bridge in c. 2005.		
Bathurst	Evans Bridge, Great Western Hwy	A road and pedestrian crossing for the Great Western Highway/Sydney Road. The Evans Bridge is Bathurst's main traffic thoroughfare across the Macquarie River, linking the central business district with Kelso, and hence, Sydney.		
Bathurst	Denison Bridge	Constructed between 1869 and 1870, this bridge replaced a bridge at the same location that was washed away by floods in 1867. It is the second oldest metal truss bridge remaining in New South Wales and now serves pedestrian traffic only.		
Bathurst	Gordon Edgell Bridge	A low level road and pedestrian bridge, north of George Street, this bridge is often subject to localised flooding.		
Bathurst	Rankens Bridge, Eglinton	Constructed circa 1856 to serve road traffic, to a design by Mr George Ranken and funded with his support. It was damaged in the floods of 1867, but subsequently restored. The restored bridge was dismantled and a new concrete bridge erected a few hundred metres downstream, just prior to the floods of 1998. A pillar of the old bridge still stands.		
Wellington	Road bridge, Mitchell Hwy	One span of the previous bridge collapsed in February 1989 due to a truck damaging a truss. A temporary pontoon bridge was installed about 500 metres (1,600 ft) downstream by engineers from the Army's 17th Construction Squadron, and used until the current bridge was completed in 1991.		
Wellington	Temporary pontoon bridge, Mitchell Highway	Light Assault Floating Bridge (LAFB) constructed in 1989 by Sappers from 9 Troop, 17 Construction Squadron at Wellington NSW; Troop Commander Lieutenant Andrew Stanner.		
Wellington	Railway bridge, Main Western line	Opened in 1881 and built to the same design by John Whitton as the Bathurst and Dubbo railway bridges.		
Geurie	Scabbing Flat Bridge	A Dare type timber truss bridge, it was completed in 1911 and serves road traffic only.		
Dubbo	Rawsonville Bridge	A Dare type timber truss bridge that was completed in 1916, the bridge serves road traffic only.		
Dubbo	Dundullimal Railway Bridge	Opened in 1925 as part of the loop railway from Molong to Dubbo.		
Dubbo	LH Ford Bridge, Mitchell Hwy	This bridge was completed in 1970 and replaced the Albert Bridge that originally operated as a toll bridge, was constructed of timber, and featured three arches. The L H Ford Bridge is Dubbo's main traffic thoroughfare across the Macquarie River, linking the central business district with West Dubbo. It provides both road and pedestrian access.		
Dubbo	Emile Serisier Bridge, Newell Hwy	A low level bridge built for the Newell Highway to bypass Dubbo city centre.		
Dubbo	Railway bridge, Main Western line	Completed in 1882 to a standard design by Chief Railway Engineer, John Whitton. The same design was used for the Bathurst and Wellington railway bridges over the Macquarie (see above).		
Dubbo	Troy Bridge	Located north of Dubbo		
Dubbo	Aunty Pearl Gibbs Bridge, Newell Hwy	A two-lane, high-level road bridge to Dubbo's north set for completion in late 2026.		
Trangie	Gin Gin Bridge	A standard Callendar-Hamilton truss bridge, prefabricated in England for the Department of Main Roads. The 101-metre-long (331 ft) bridge was opened in February 1963.		
Warren	Sturt Bridge			
Warren	Bells Bridge			

== Catchment ==
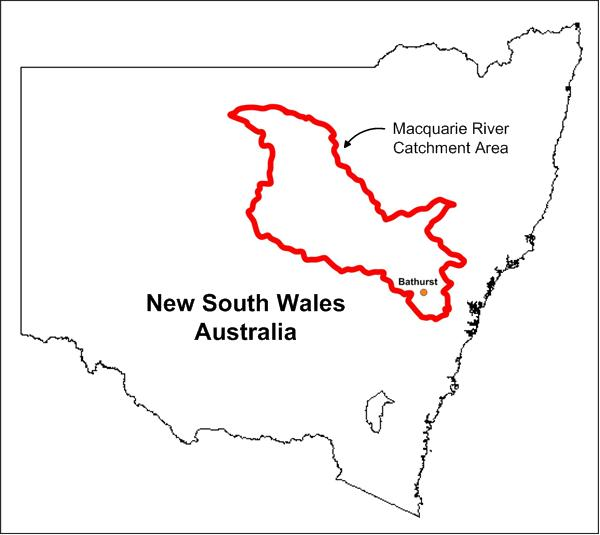

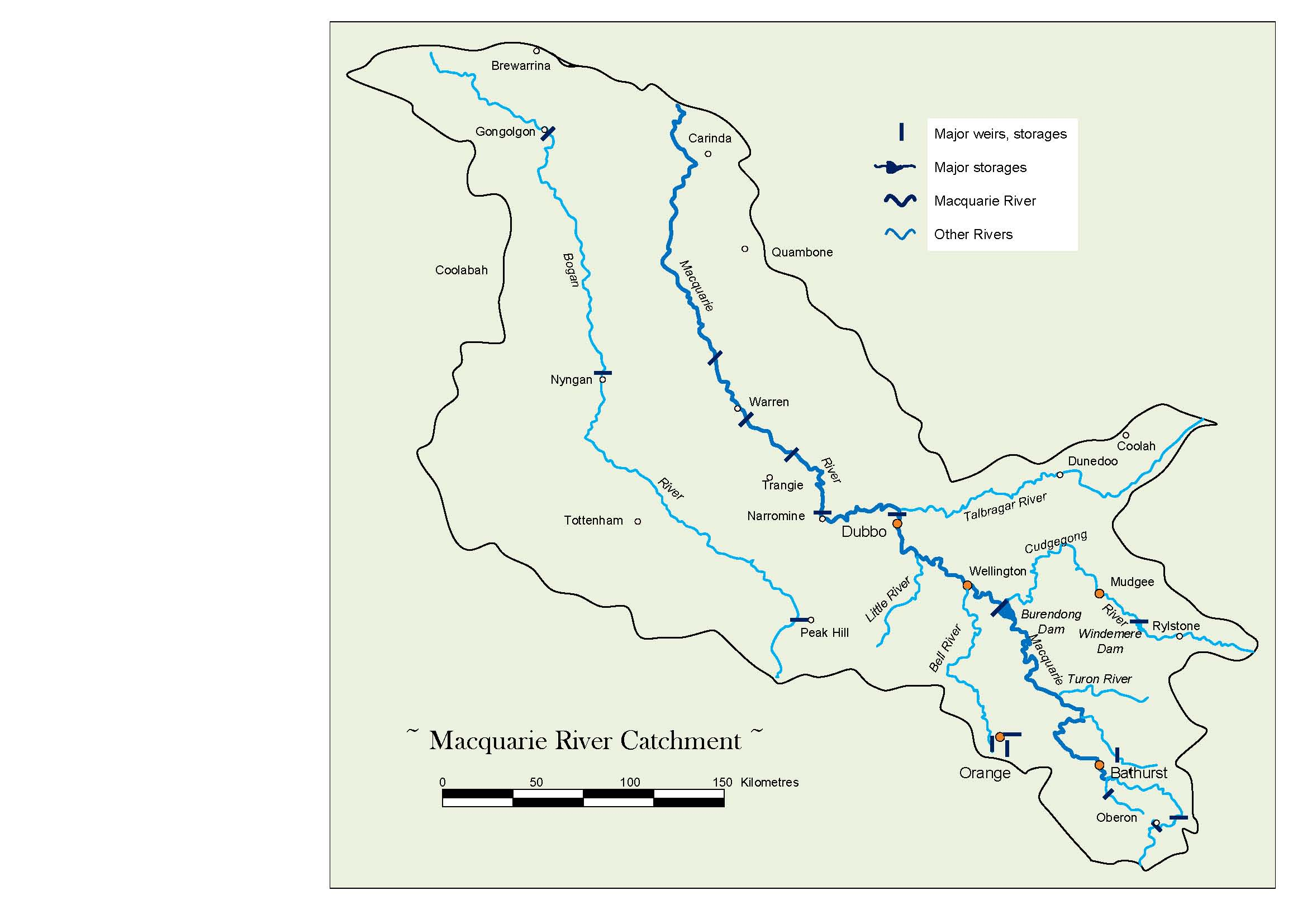

The Macquarie system covers an area of more than 74,000 square kilometres (29,000 sq mi). Over 72% of land is flat, with an additional 17% undulating to hilly. The remainder is steep to mountainous, rising progressively to elevations above 900 metres (3,000 ft). To the east the boundary is formed by the Great Dividing Range. This boundary extends from near Oberon in the south to Coolah in the north. A well defined ridge extends north-west from the Great Dividing Range for around 400 kilometres (250 mi), then the boundary turns north.

From Bathurst, near the formation of the river, it passes through the following geographic areas:

- Bathurst Plains, undulating country of 700 metres (2,300 ft) elevation surrounded by high tablelands on all sides. This includes an extensive floodplain around Bathurst
- past Hill End Plateau, where it is joined from the east by the Turon River, the river drains a plateau extending from near Portland to Sofala. The elevation is around 1,100 metres (3,600 ft) in the south and 700 metres (2,300 ft) in the north. This area is predominantly rugged slopes.
- Burrendong Dam, the Macquarie River is joined from the east by the Cudgegong River, which rises in the hills around Rylstone with a general elevation around 700 metres (2,300 ft)
- through Wellington and Dubbo where the river is joined by the Bell and Little Rivers. The Bell River rises in flat to undulating country of the Orange plateau, which has a general elevation of 900 metres (3,000 ft) with the highest point being the extinct volcanic peak of Mount Canobolas at roughly 1,400 metres (4,600 ft). Between Wellington and Dubbo extensive flat areas are evident.
- north of Dubbo, the Talbragar River joins the Macquarie. The Talbragar is the most important downstream tributary. This river rises in mountainous country at the junction of the Great Dividing Range and the Liverpool Range. The country through which the Talbragar River runs is broad and flat, bordered by undulating hills that disperse as the river nears Dubbo.
- north of Dubbo, the river passes through flat plains flowing north-west through Narromine and Warren. A complex series of effluent creeks connect the Macquarie, Darling and Bogan Rivers.
- Macquarie Marshes lie at the end of the river channel proper. Near Carinda, the Macquarie is joined by Marthaguy Creek which drains an area 6,500 square kilometres (2,500 sq mi) and carries spill-over water from the Macquarie and Castlereagh Rivers during floods.

=== Rainfall ===
Rainfall varies across the catchment of the Macquarie River. Generally the peaks and tablelands receive higher rainfall due to the shadowing effects of the surrounding ranges. The Great Dividing Range area receives between 750 millimetres (30 in) and 900 millimetres (35 in) annual median rainfall. This is distributed relatively uniformly throughout the year. Where breaks in the Dividing Range allow the intrusion of moist easterly air streams inland, annual median rainfall of 750 millimetres (30 in) or more is experienced further westward. Further north-west in the Castlereagh and middle portions of the Macquarie valleys the annual median rainfall is 300 millimetres (12 in) to 400 millimetres (16 in).

Rainfall can vary dramatically over several years. For example, records show a variation from >200% to <50% of the average annual figure. Evaporation varies from less than 1,000 millimetres (39 in) south-east of Bathurst up to more than 2,000 millimetres (79 in) at Bourke.

== Statistics ==
River catchment statistics (May 2009)
Area total	12,300 square kilometres (4,700 sq mi)
Total storage volume	1,559,620 megalitres (55,077×10^{6} cu ft)
Total surface water use	406,840 ML/yr
Development category	overdeveloped
Mean annual run-off	0 ML/yr

== History ==
=== Aboriginal history ===
The Wiradjuri people are the original inhabitants of the area that includes the Macquarie River catchment. The Wiradjuri knew the river as the Wambool, which means "winding river". The noted Wiradjuri warrior Windradyne came from the upper Macquarie River region, and was fatally wounded from a gun shot after a man hunt was commissioned by the crown in 1829.

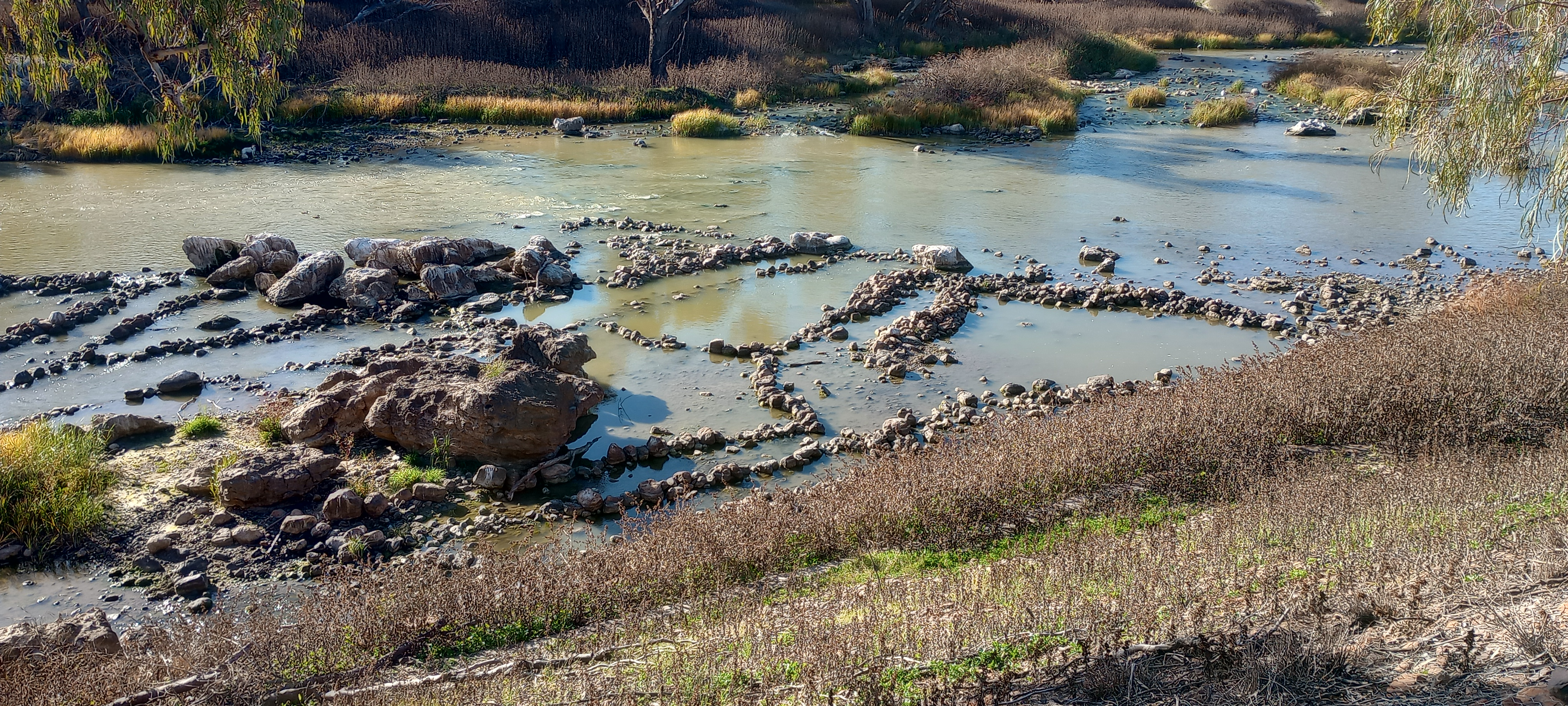
The Brewarrina fish traps in 2023

Also, near Brewarrina, there are at least two sites of significance to Aboriginal people along and within the river and these are Cuddie Springs and the Brewarrina Aboriginal Fish Traps.

- Cuddie Springs Archaeological Site, contains the oldest evidence of bread making in the world with some sections being dated as being 30,000 – 36,000 years old.
- Brewarrina Aboriginal Fish Traps, also known as Baiame's Ngunnhu, which are estimated to be 40,000 years old which is significantly older then other traps found in Australia.

=== European history ===
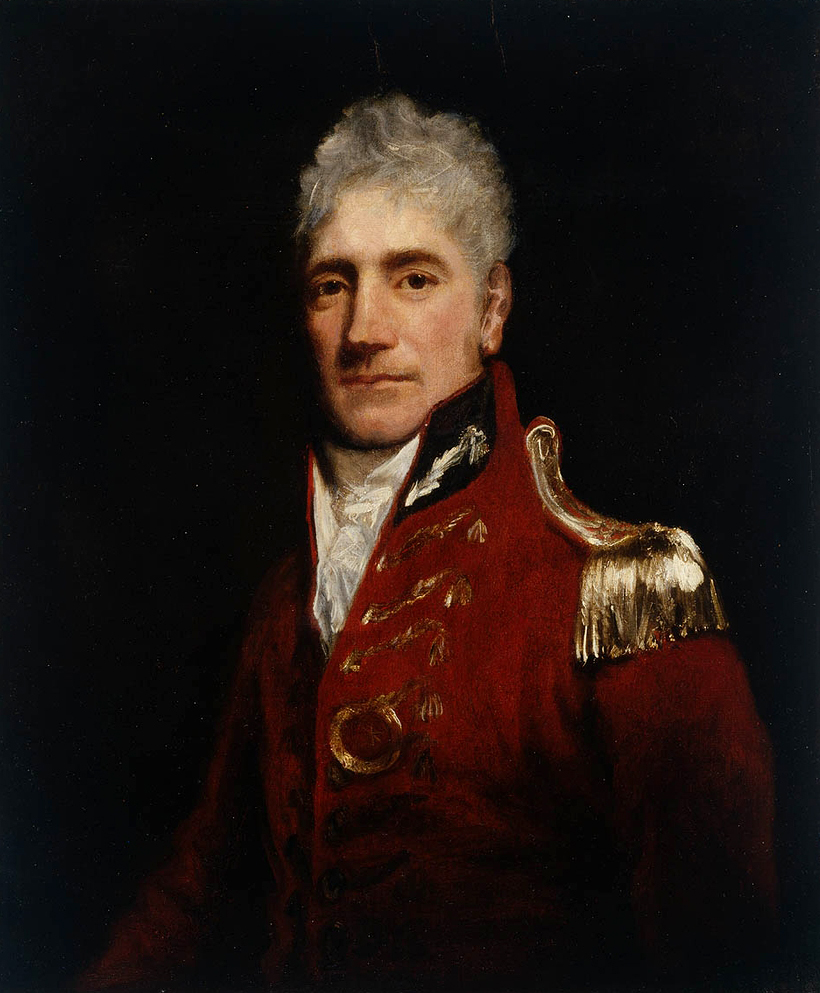
Governor Lachlan Macquarie, after whom the river was named by Europeans in 1813.

The upper reaches of the Macquarie River were first seen by Europeans in 1813 and the river was named in honour of the then Governor of the Colony of New South Wales, Lieutenant-Colonel (later Major-General) Lachlan Macquarie. In 1813 Deputy Surveyor of Lands and explorer, George Evans wrote in his journal:

30 November 1813: I have at length reached the Ridge I so much wished to do after walking about 2 Miles, where I had a prospect to the North for a great distance; A Mist arises from a part I suppose to be a River or a large Lagoon about 20 Miles Off; and on 9 December 1813: I have called the Main Stream "Macquarie River".

Two years later Governor Macquarie inspected the country surrounding Bathurst and the Macquarie River and wrote on 10 June 1815, on his return to Government House in Sydney:

At the distance of seven miles from the bridge over the Campbell River, Bathurst Plains open to the view, presenting a rich tract of campaign country of 11 miles in length, bounded on both sides by gently rising and very beautiful hills, thinly wooded. The Macquarie River, which is constituted by the junction of the Fish and Campbell River, takes a winding course through the plains, which can be easily traced from the high lands adjoining by the particular verdure of the trees on its bank, which are likewise the only trees throughout the extent of the plains. The level and clear surface of these plains gives them at first view very much the appearance of lands in a state of cultivation. It is impossible to behold this grand scene without a feeling of admiration and surprise, whilst the silence and solitude, which reign in a space of such extent and beauty as seems designed by nature for the occupancy and comfort of man, create a degree of melancholy in the mind which may be more easily imagined than described.

During 1817 and 1818, explorer John Oxley was commissioned to explore the course of the Lachlan and Macquarie rivers respectively. Writing in his journal, published in 1820, Oxley described the junction of the two rivers:

The river in Wellington Valley had been swelled by the late rains, insomuch that the water below its junction with the Macquarie was quite discoloured. From the fineness of the soil, the rain had made the ground very soft, rendering it difficult for the horses to travel..... Our day's journey lay generally over an open forest country, with rich flats on either side of the river .... The river had many fine reaches, extending in straight lines from one to three miles, and of a corresponding breadth. The rapids, although frequent, offered no material obstruction to the boats. The current in the long reaches was scarcely perceptible .... The river expanded into beautiful reaches, having great depth of water, and from two to three hundred feet broad, literally covered with water-fowl of different kinds: the richest flats bordered the river, apparently more extensive on the south side. The vast body of water which this river must contain in times of flood is confined within exterior banks, and its inundations are thus deprived of mischief..... The trees were of the eucalyptus (apple tree), and on the hills a few of the callitris macrocarpa [Note: Callitr. Vent decad.] were seen.... The main bed of the river was much contracted, but very deep, the waters spreading to the depth of a foot or eighteen inches over the banks, but all running on the same point of bearing. After going about twenty miles, we lost the land and trees: the channel of the river, which lay through reeds, and was from one to three feet deep, ran northerly. This continued for three or four miles farther, when although there had been no previous change in the breadth, depth, and rapidity of the stream for several miles, and I was sanguine in my expectations of soon entering the long sought for Australian sea, it all at once eluded our farther pursuit by spreading on every point from north-west to north-east, among the ocean of reeds which surrounded us, still running with the same rapidity as before. There, was no channel whatever among those reeds, and the depth varied from three to five feet. This astonishing change (for I cannot call it a termination of the river), of course left me no alternative but to endeavour to return to some spot, on which we could effect a landing before dark.... To assert positively that we were on the margin of the lake or sea into which this great body of water is discharged, might reasonably be deemed a conclusion which has nothing but conjecture for its basis; but if an opinion may be permitted to be hazarded from actual appearances, mine is decidedly in favour of our being in the immediate vicinity of an inland sea, or lake, most probably a shoal one, and gradually filling up by immense depositions from the higher lands, left by the waters which flow into it. It is most singular, that the high-lands on this continent seem to be confined to the sea-coast, or not to extend to any great distance from it.

By 1828, explorer Charles Sturt was commissioned to ascertain "the limits of the Colony" by following the Macquarie River "for the express purpose of ascertaining the nature and extent of that basin into which the Macquarie was supposed to fall, and whether any connection existed between it and the streams falling westerly". Navigating the marshes (later named in honour of Lachlan Macquarie), Sturt was the first European to visit the Darling River, named in honour of General Ralph Darling.

== Water management ==
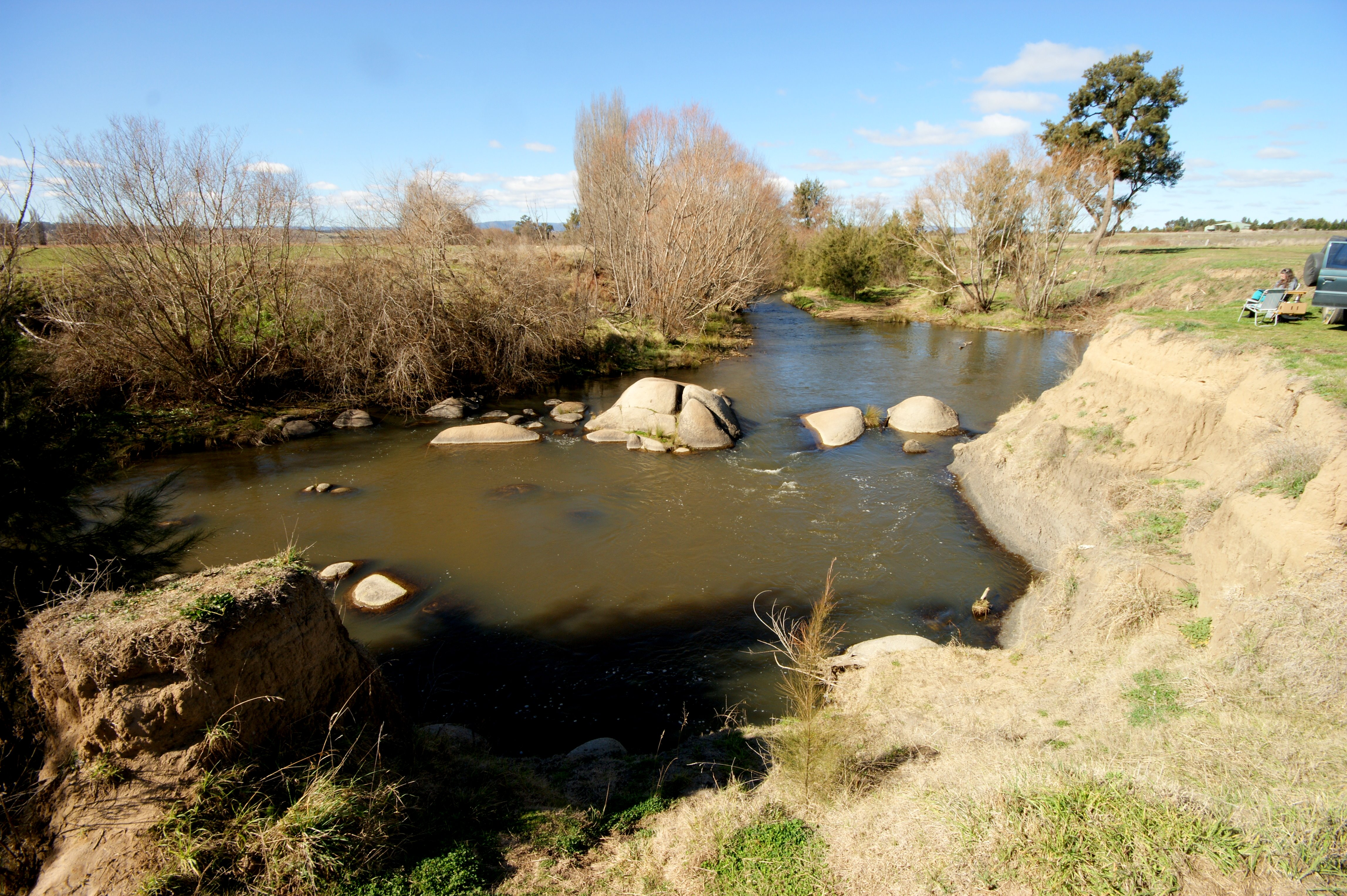
The Macquarie River, not far from its source, near Bathurst

=== Irrigation ===
The Macquarie River catchment is a regulated Water Management Area and includes private irrigation as well as several public irrigation schemes located at Narromine – Trangie, Buddah Lakes, Tenandra, Trangie – Nevertire, Nevertire, and Marthaguy.

=== Flooding ===
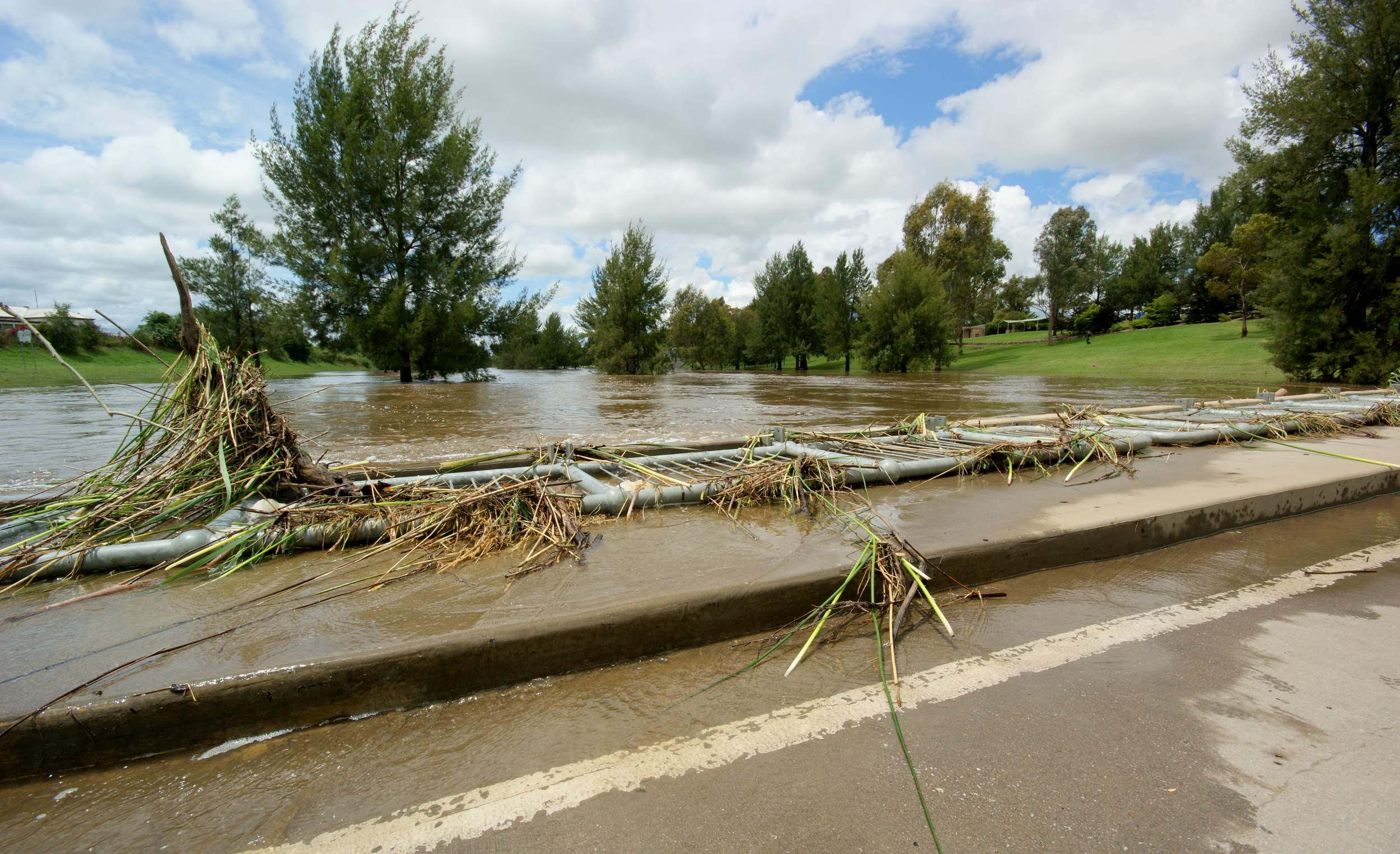
Flood debris on the Gordon Edgell Bridge, Bathurst in January 2011

The Macquarie River has a history of flooding. Some significant events are listed below. After major floods, water can flow past the Macquarie Marshes and into the Barwon-Darling river system upstream of Brewarrina.

- 1867 – devastating floods wash away the first Denison Bridge at Bathurst and also debris damages Ranken's Bridge
- 1955 – serious flooding of Macquarie River amongst other river systems
- 1979 – heavy flooding of the low lying sections along the river
- 1986 – severe localised flooding in Bathurst
- 1990 – severe localised flooding in Bathurst
- 1998 – there was a large flood that affected the farming of cotton and vegetables. Bathurst was severely affected
- 2010 – November/December saw major flooding of the lower Macquarie River following heavy rainfall events throughout Eastern Australia
- 2016 – August/September saw moderate to major flooding along the entire river.

== Recreation ==
Recreational activities are popular along the length of the river particularly in the communities it passes by.

- Fishing – The following species of fresh water fish can be caught: brown trout, carp, eel-tailed catfish, golden perch, murray cod, rainbow trout, redfin, silver perch, trout cod and yabbies.
- Lake Burrendong – a large dam very popular with water sports enthusiasts activities include skiing, jet skis, sailing, and general boating.
- Parks – in Bathurst along the bank of the river is Bi-Centennial Park. This park is used for recreation purposes, picnics, events, bicycle riding, etc. In Warren, Macquarie Park, off Burton St, has English-style formal gardens and a monument in honour of Oxley and Sturt who traced the course of the Macquarie River. Oxley camped near Warren in 1818 and is further commemorated in the naming of Oxley Park on the other side of the river. Sturt passed by just to the north-east in 1828 and the bridge over the river is named after him. Hundreds of galahs roost in the red gums at sunset. The adjacent Red River Gum Walk follows the riverbank around to a 500-year-old river gum adjacent the Warren Hole, a natural and permanent waterhole once used for swimming and fishing.

== Gallery ==
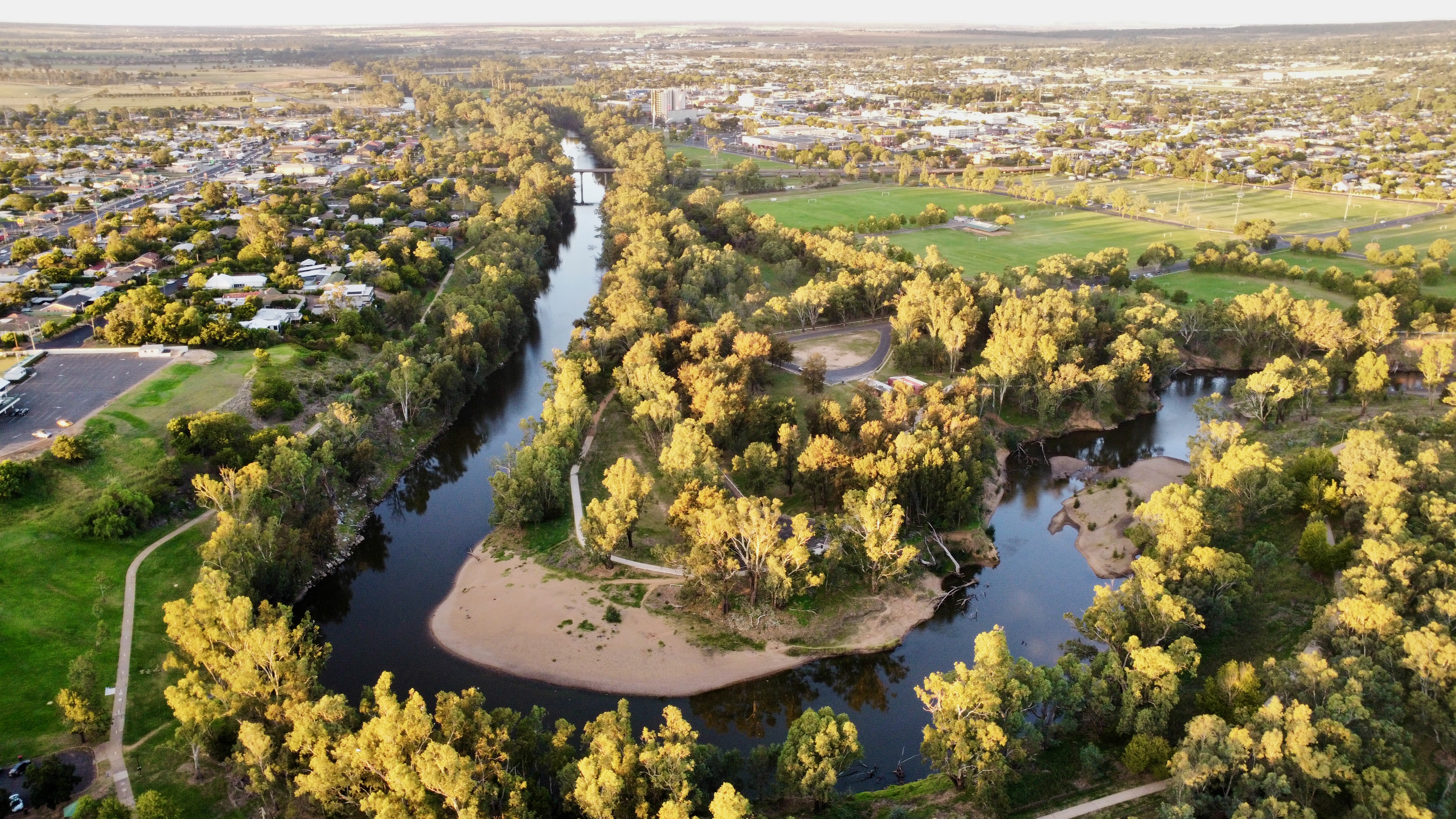
A bend in the Macquarie river in Dubbo.

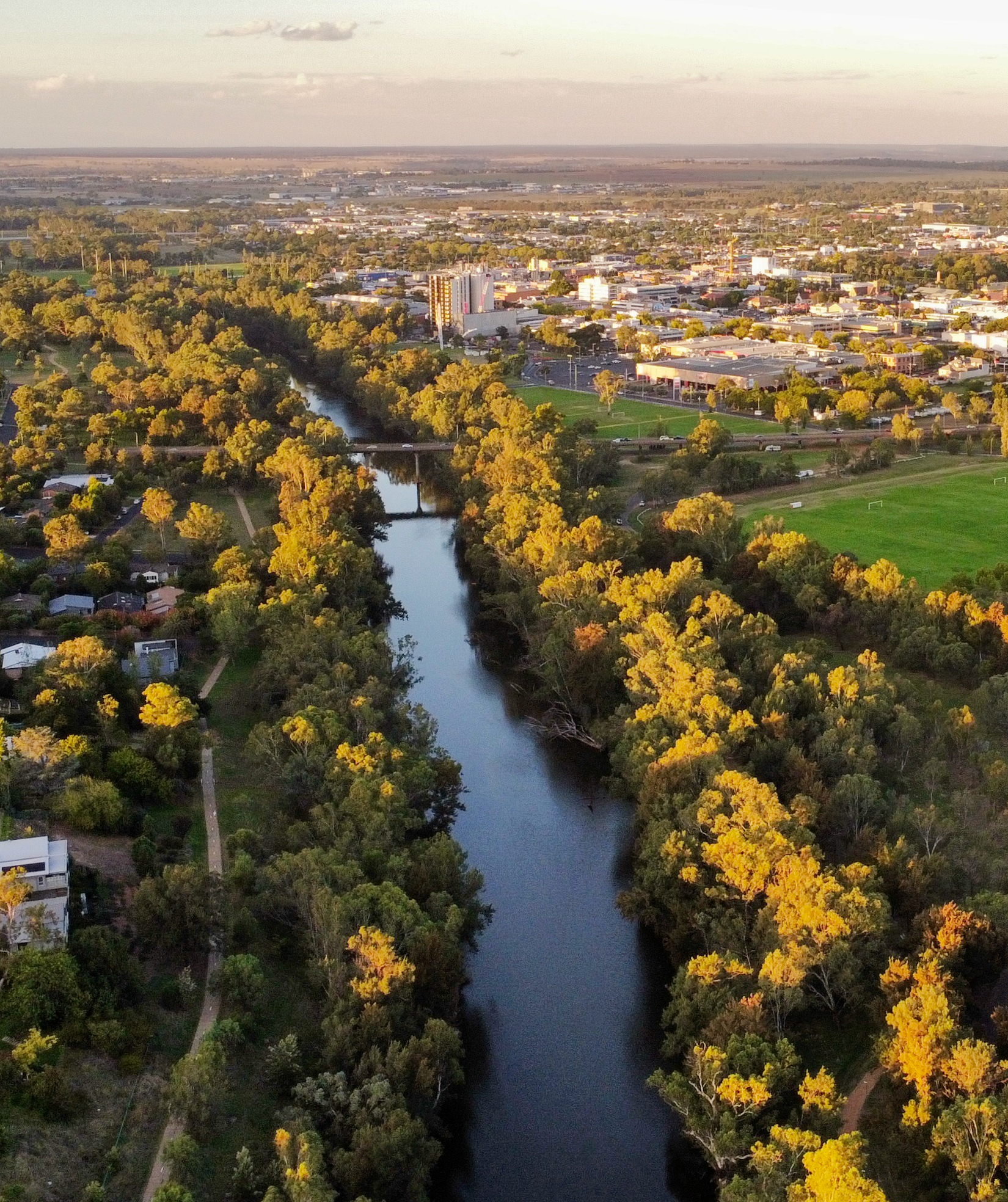
The Macquarie River flowing through Dubbo under the L.H. Ford Bridge.

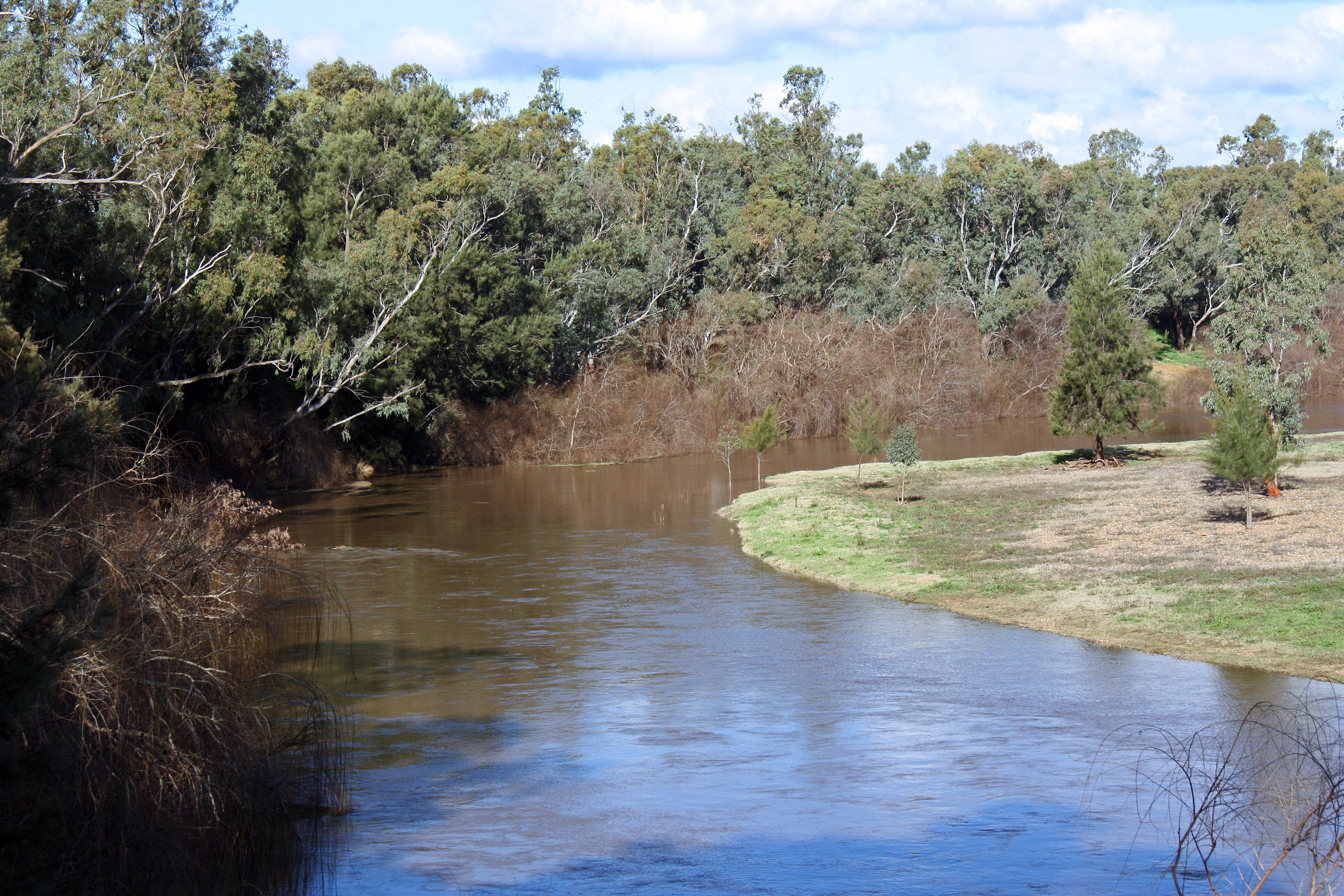
The Macquarie River in flood at Dubbo in August 2010.

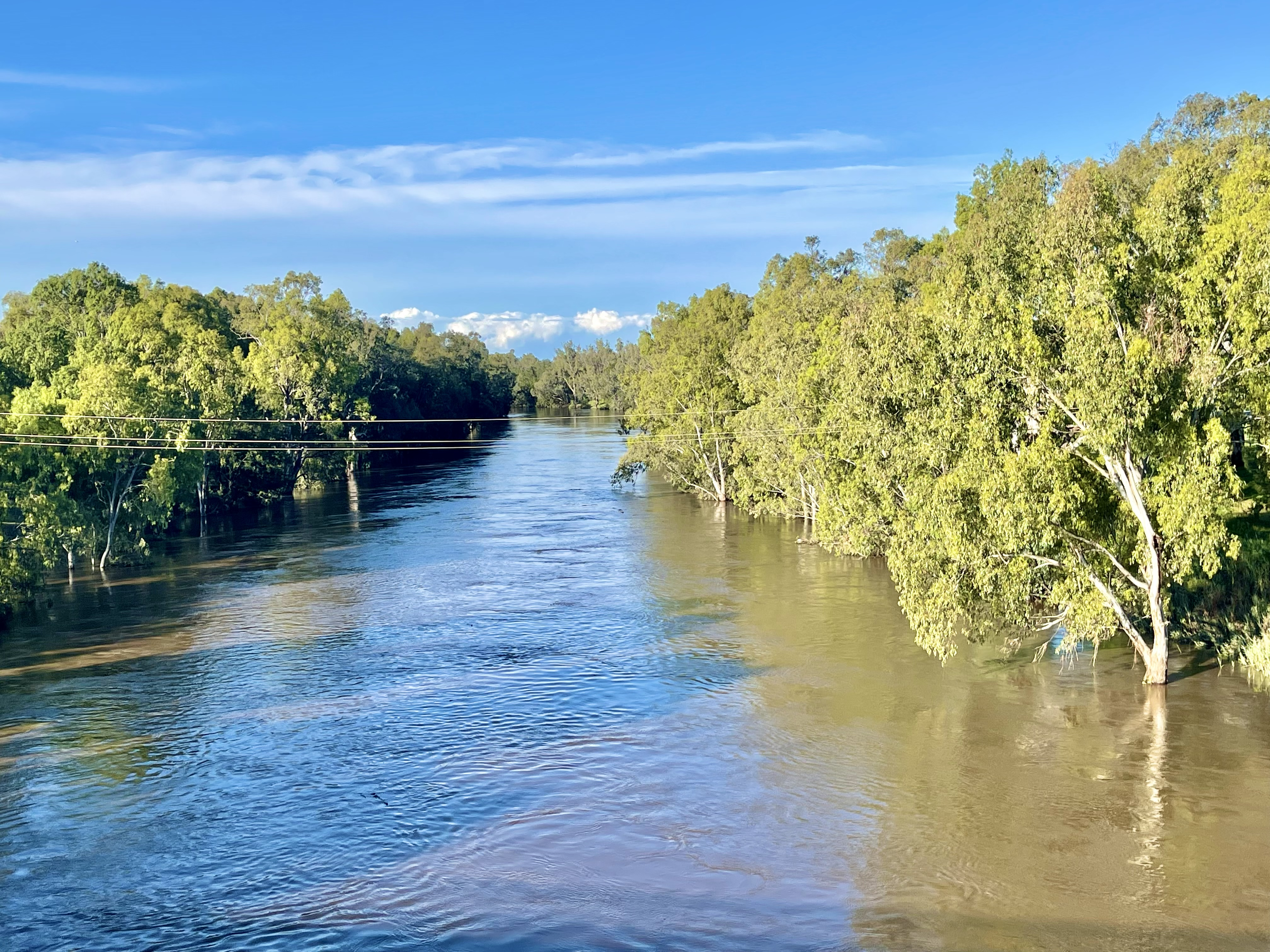
The Macquarie River in flood from the L.H. Ford Bridge in Dubbo in August 2010.

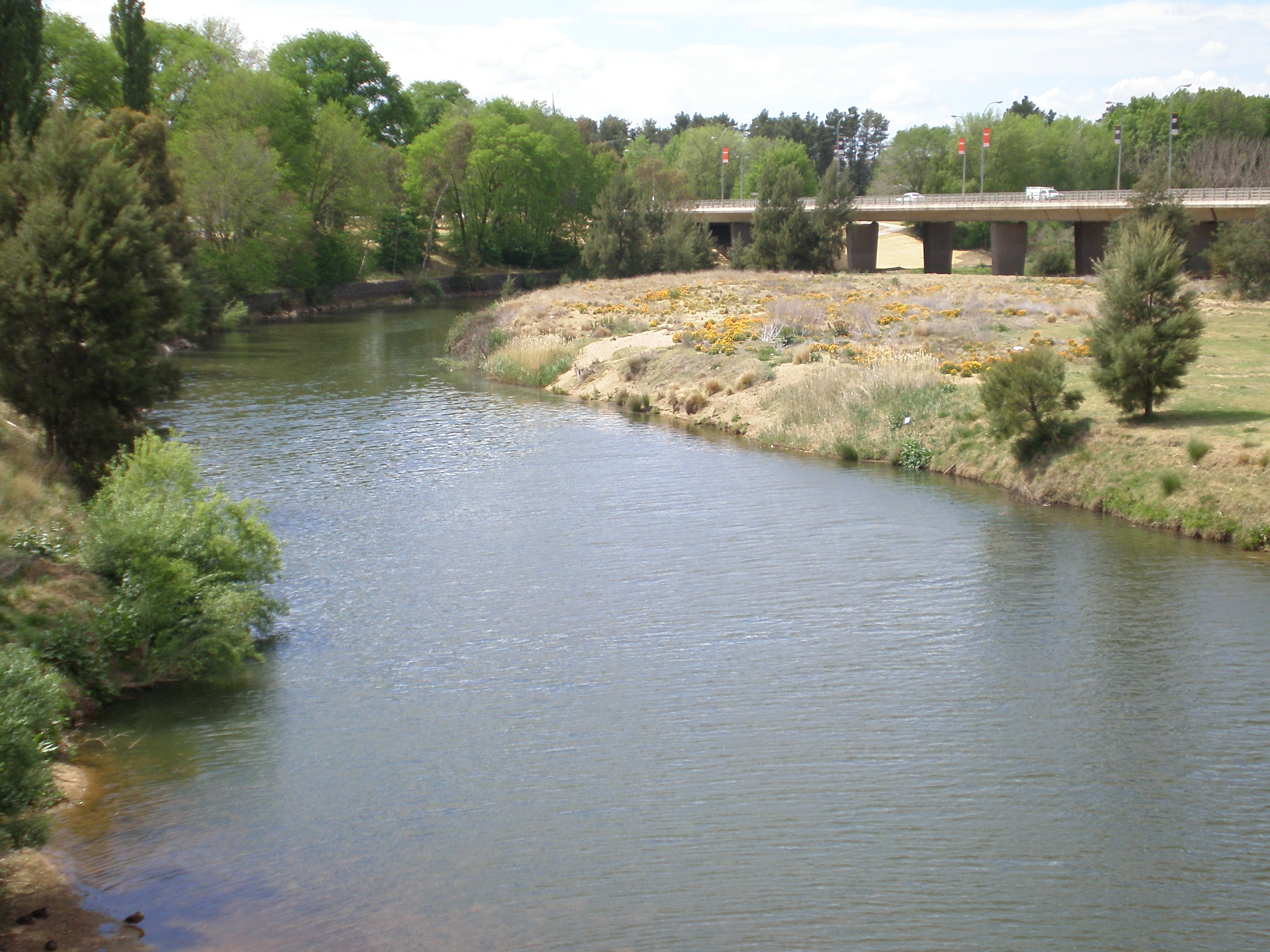
The Macquarie River flowing under the Evans Bridge in Bathurst in October 2006.
