= Binnawee Homestead =

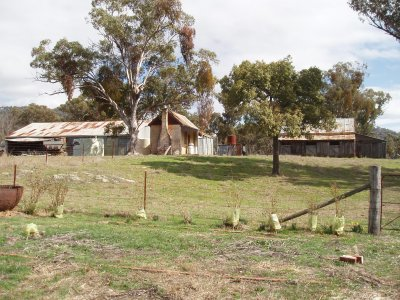
- View of outbuildings from the homestead

- Location within New South Wales Location within Australia
- 32.5100°S 149.5086°E
- Location: 111 Lester's Lane, Mudgee, Mid-Western Regional Council, New South Wales, Australia

History
- Built: 1850–1900

Site notes
- Owner: DB & ME Lester

New South Wales Heritage Register
- Official name: Binnawee Homestead and Outbuildings; Binnawee group complex
- Type: state heritage (built)
- Designated: 9 June 2009
- Reference no.: 1780
- Type: Homestead Complex
- Category: Farming and Grazing
- Builders: Unknown

Binnawee Homestead is a heritage-listed disused homestead at 111 Lester's Lane, Mudgee, Mid-Western Regional Council, New South Wales, Australia. It was built from 1850 to 1900. It was added to the New South Wales State Heritage Register on 9 June 2009.

== History ==
Wiradjuri Land

The Wiradjuri Aboriginal people lived in the Mudgee area for many thousands of years before Europeans arrived. The name Mudgee is derived from the Wiradjuri term Moothi meaning "Nest in the Hills".

Early European occupation of the area

James Blackman was the first European settler to cross the Cudgegong River in 1821 followed by Lieutenant William Lawson who was then commandant of Bathurst. Lawson would later take up 6,000 acres (2,428 hectares) in the area. George and Henry Cox, sons of William Cox, were the first settlers on the Cudgegong River when they established the Menah run, 3 kilometres north of the current town. The European settlers were soon in conflict with the Wiradjuri over a range of issues including killing of livestock and animals such as kangaroos and possums which were major food sources for the indigenous people. Martial law was declared in 1824 leading to significant losses by the Wiradjuri.

While the site of Mudgee was surveyed for a village in 1823, Menah was the original settlement having a police station and a lock-up by 1833. Robert Hoddle designed the village which was gazetted in 1838. John Blackman built a slab hut, the first dwelling in Mudgee and its general store. By 1841, there were 36 dwellings, three hotels, a hospital, a post office, two stores and an Anglican church. An Anglican school was established in that decade as well.

In 1851, the population of Mudgee was 200. However, the population soon exploded with the discovery of gold in New South Wales. While no gold was found in Mudgee itself, the town prospered as gold was discovered in nearby Hargraves, Gulgong, Hill End and Windeyer, some temporarily reaching populations of 20,000. . . As the gold mines petered out in the latter half of the 19th century, Mudgee was sustained by the strength of its wool industry as well as the nascent wine industry established by a German immigrant, Adam Roth, in the 1850s.

Family ownership of Binnawee farm

Henry Cox was the son of William Cox, who was responsible for the construction on the first road across the Blue Mountains. Henry Cox became the first grantee of the land now known as Binnawee, bought at a cost of 244 pounds and registered in 1834. This grant adjoined further of his crown grants to the east and to the north. In 1852 Henry Cox sold the Cullenbone property, including Binnawee, to William Lewis, whose father Richard Lewis had worked with Henry's father on the road construction project as Chief Superintendent. Throughout the 1850s Lewis took up several runs on the Castlereagh River. Perhaps buoyed by his prosperity, Lewis is believed to have built the Georgian two-storey homestead which was initially called "LoisAlle".

By 1862 Lewis was insolvent and all of his real estate interests seized and sold. "LoisAlle" was purchased by the Blackmen brothers of Mudgee, cousins of Lewis' wife. William Richard and Samuel Alfred Blackman, sons of Mudgee pioneers, William and Sarah Blackman, became prominent landowners in the Mudgee district. In 1869 William bought out Samuel's share in the property and lived there during the 1870s, occasionally leasing the house and portions of adjoining land.

In 1878 Blackman sold the property to George Henry Cox of Burrundulla, a prominent pastoralist in Mudgee (and nephew of the original grantee - he was also Henry Cox's son-in-law since he had married his cousin Henrietta). George Henry Cox absorbed the property into his adjoining landholding known as Piambong and the house and lands were leased. From 1883 to 1886 the house was occupied by George Henry Cox's eldest son, George Henry Frederick Cox. In the late 1890s the house was occupied by John Turner McRae, a nephew by marriage and manager of Piambong. Legal documentation in 1898 refers to him as John Turner McRae as of "Binnawee", although it is not known precisely when or by whom the property was given this name.

Shortly before his death in 1901, George Henry Cox transferred the property to his son-in-law George Stewart. In 1900 the widower Stewart and his four children took up residence at Binnawee where he was assisted by his sisters-in-law, Lucy and Alice Cox. Referred to as the "squire of Binnawee" George played a prominent role in the political, commercial and social life of the Mudgee district. He was an alderman of the Municipality of Cudgegong for twenty-one years, including four years as mayor from 1905 to 1908, and also served as a Justice of the Peace, coroner and magistrate. He was also a pillar of Mudgee's Saint John's Anglican Church.

In 1923 Stewart leased Binnawee to Dr Charles Lester and his son, Bruce, and moved to Sydney where he died in 1926. Charles Lester was born in Mudgee in 1865, and graduated from medical studies at the University of Edinburgh in 1888. He married Mary Bruce before returning to Mudgee to establish his medical practice in the early 1890s. Also a qualified pharmacist, Charles operated his medical practice and pharmacy in premises in Church Street, Mudgee, later known as Mercer's and Gawthorne's Pharmacy. Charles left Mudgee and established a practice in Macquarie Street in 1924.

Bruce Lester, also a qualified pharmacist, was a member of the 6th Light Horse Division during World War I, serving for four years in the Middle East. In 1920 he selected Kobi, a block of 225 acres adjacent to Binnawee, which was formerly part of an 1823 grant to Captain Henry Steel. In 1923 Bruce married Mabel Hume, by whom he had one son, David. Bruce and Mabel Lester lived at Binnawee which was run primarily as a sheep property with some cattle. Charles and Bruce Lester also bred racehorses, while Bruce was a competent amateur jockey, frequently riding in the Bligh Picnic Races.

In 1944 Bruce Lester became ill and, as there was a shortage of manpower due to the war, 16-year-old son David took over the management of the property. In 1948 Bruce Lester purchased the Binnawee homestead portion from George Stewart's trustees and the property was eventually expanded to some 2,500 acres (1,000 ha) . In 1950 David married Mary Grant and built a new homestead on Binnawee in 1955. Gradually reduced to 120 hectares (300 acres) over the years, Binnawee retains some sheep and cattle. In partnership with their daughters - Elizabeth Ganguly, Anne Lofts, and Robyn Holdaway - David and Mary have recently planted olive groves.

Architectural context of house and homestead

The historic Binnawee Homestead building is the earliest surviving two-storeyed house in the Mudgee district: Burrandulla homestead was constructed in 1864 and Havilah homestead in 1872. Bleak House in Lawson Street, Mudgee dates from c. 1860.

== Description ==
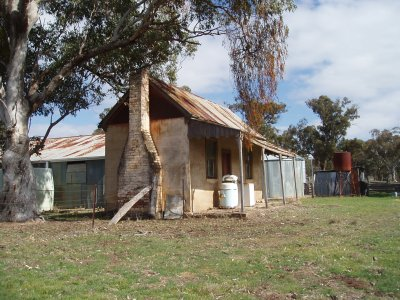
One of the outbuildings

Binnawee Homestead is located on part of a crown grant of 976 acres (395 ha) on Macdonald's Creek at Cullenbone, several kilometres north-west of Mudgee, across the Parishes of Munna and Piambong in the County of Wellington. Although the property is operated as a working farm, the curtilage of this listing closely surrounds the group of mid-19th-century buildings, of which the focal point is the historic Binnawee Homestead.

Homestead

Thought to have been constructed c. 1855, the homestead building is substantial but unpretentious. Its Georgian style owes much to earlier Australian vernacular design and it was most likely designed by the builder or copied from a pattern book.

Facing south-east with front and rear elevations of five bays, the house is a compact rectangle with a deceptively asymmetrical exterior. The fenestration of the front elevation is balanced, but at the rear the windows on both the lower and upper levels are irregularly placed to accommodate the off-centre stair. Consequently, the two rooms on the south-western corner on both the ground and first floors are relatively small.

The light red bricks are, for the most part, in good condition. The south-eastern elevation is in Flemish bond, while the rear and two sides are in colonial or garden wall bond. All windows and doors feature flat gauged arches with tuck pointing.

The steeply pitched hipped roof, which retains the original shingles under the unpainted corrugated iron, is pierced by two tall, corbelled brick chimneys servicing five fireplaces. A timber-floored verandah, 1.8 metres (5.9 ft) deep, surrounds the ground floor, while its concave profile roof is supported by flat, stop-chamfered timber columns. On the ground floor of the front elevation two sets of shuttered French doors flank each side of the central front door. All windows are six-pane sashes and featured shutters, although the windows at the front are slightly larger than those on the rear and sides. Many windows retain the original glazing and feature the remains of stencilled floral patterns.

The impressive double front doors, capped by a three-paned stencilled fanlight are painted red on the exterior. Each door features a single panel with heavy bolection mouldings and a semi-circular headed top. Stained and lacquered on the interior, each door has two panels with a semi-circular headed top on the upper panel. Both the front and rear doors have substantial drawback rimlocks.

Although the house is relatively small there is a distinction between the principal rooms at the front and secondary rooms at the rear on both floors. Although the skirtings are a standard size throughout, architraves and doors are smaller in the four rear rooms. Ceiling height is a uniform 2.88 metres (9.4 ft) metres.

Downstairs, the front rooms were used by the Lesters as a dining room and a living room, although previously the living room had been the principal bedroom. The dining room features an elaborate wallpaper and frieze, while the substantial cornice in the dining room, picked out in several tones, is possibly a later installation. The study and the breakfast room occupy the two smaller rooms at the rear, with the breakfast room featuring a particularly fine Edwardian frieze of alpine scenery.

The stair is narrow and steep, starting in a spiral ninety-degree turn, with a straight flight to a landing and a short return flight to the upper landing. The squared balusters, handrail and turned newels are typical of a mid-Victorian stair. The fretwork on the side of the steps and the panelling underneath the stair are the only two instances of ornamentation in what is a relatively austere interior.

Of the four rooms upstairs, the bedroom in the eastern corner, over the living room, is the largest room in the house and was originally the upstairs parlour. With windows facing the south-east and north-east, this room is well lit and has expansive views. Bruce and Mabel Lester created a small lobby on the south-western end of this room by erecting a partition wall, so as to give greater privacy to the two front rooms.

The joinery throughout is lacquered cedar but regrettably all five of the classical yet sober mantelpieces have been painted. The mantelpieces upstairs are smaller and vary slightly from their downstairs counterparts. All walls and even some ceilings are papered and reflect a variety of periods; several layers of paper can be discerned on some walls. Ceilings are mostly square-set, with only the hallway and dining room featuring cornices.

Floor coverings consist of bare boards and rugs of varying sizes, while some stunning linos with intricate geometric patterns remain in place in several rooms.

Binnawee was allegedly the second house in the Mudgee district to have electric lighting and several rooms retain the original pull-cords. An American Delco 32 volt generator was installed by the Lesters in 1923 and it is still housed in a building adjacent to the house.

In 1967 Binnawee homestead received a National Trust "B" classification, and under the current system holds a "recorded" listing. It was also on the former Register of the National Estate.

Kitchen block

A walkway, covered in semi-circular corrugated iron, leads from the rear verandah of the homestead to the kitchen block several metres away. Believed to have been the original homestead, the kitchen block is built in brick in Flemish garden wall bond, and contains two rooms under a gabled roof with two small rooms under a skillion section at the rear. As none of the rooms have ceilings, the original shingles are still clearly visible under the corrugated iron roof. Of particular interest is the door opening from the covered way into the kitchen. It was once a tradition, begun in the time of the Stewarts, for visitors who spent more than a week at Binnawee to carve their initials into the door; consequently, there are hundreds of initials, with, no doubt, many associated stories.

This building was badly damaged by storms in 2001. The roof, timber structures and a large quantity of its soft brick walls are missing. While it would be desirable to reconstruct these missing elements to protect the remains, such a reconstructed building would have a high ratio of new fabric. Meanwhile, the kitchen building is considered to be a ruin, and not subject to the Minimum Standards of Maintenance and Repair The kitchen building should be managed so that its decay is retarded.

Workshop

Located several metres to the north-east of the house is a building of random rubble construction which is uncharacteristic of the rest of the buildings in the homestead complex. Used as a dairy and later as a workshop by the Lesters, it was built as a conservatory in the early 1900s by George Stewart's sisters-in-law, Lucy and Alice Cox, who lived at Binnawee with the Stewart family. The clay for the bricks and the stone for the rubble workshop were probably sourced from the property.

Stables

The stables are located two hundred metres to the north-west of the rear of the house. The original gabled brick section with a loft is constructed in Flemish garden wall bond and is presumed to be contemporary with the kitchen block. The building has been expanded at various times with drop slab additions. The roof, originally shingled, is mostly corrugated iron sheeting, while some sections retain flat galvanised iron tiles.

Workman's cottage

Several metres south of the stables is a small gabled workman's cottage, constructed in non-reinforced concrete and rendered in ashlar, which dates from c. 1923. The workman's cottage, and early concrete structure, has survived remarkably well.

Shearing shed

The rambling shearing shed, 400 metres (440 yd) west of the house, is considerably ancient in parts. Partly clad in timber and corrugated iron and constructed in several stages, it has been extended by both Bruce and David Lester.

Well

A 19th-century well survives intact adjacent to the creek below the homestead.

Dog kennels, formerly stables

Low or intrusive significance.

Machinery shed

Low or intrusive significance.

=== Condition ===
The homestead has not been occupied since 1970 and has endured some storm damage to first floor windows. In a poor to fair condition, the homestead requires urgent attention before further deterioration occurs. The detached kitchen block is in a poor condition, having been substantially damaged during storms in 2001. The stables and shearing shed are in fair condition, but the stables require some structural work; both buildings remain in regular use. The workshop and the workman's cottage are both in poor condition and require structural work.

As there has been a continual European presence on the property since the early days of European settlement in the Mudgee district, the environs of the homestead and outbuildings would have considerable archaeological potential.

The homestead especially has retained its integrity since construction and the majority of the homestead's outbuildings remain relatively untouched. The kitchen block, which was probably the original homestead building, was badly damaged by storms in 2001 and requires urgent repairs and conservation work.

=== Modifications and dates ===
The homestead remains virtually intact since its construction c. 1855 (estimate Philip Cox/Howard Tanner). A detached weatherboard bathroom was added to a side verandah in the 1920s and is non-intrusive. Modifications on the interior include the installation of a 32 volt electric lighting system in 1923, the installation of a partition wall upstairs in the 1930s (easily removed) and the replacement of a lath and plaster ceiling by a timber-lined ceiling in the early 1900s in the living room; the dining room cornice may have been a later installation.

All outbuildings, except for the kitchen, are relatively intact. The stables have received slab additions on two sides, and the shearing shed, which has been expanded and renovated from time to time.

== Heritage listing ==
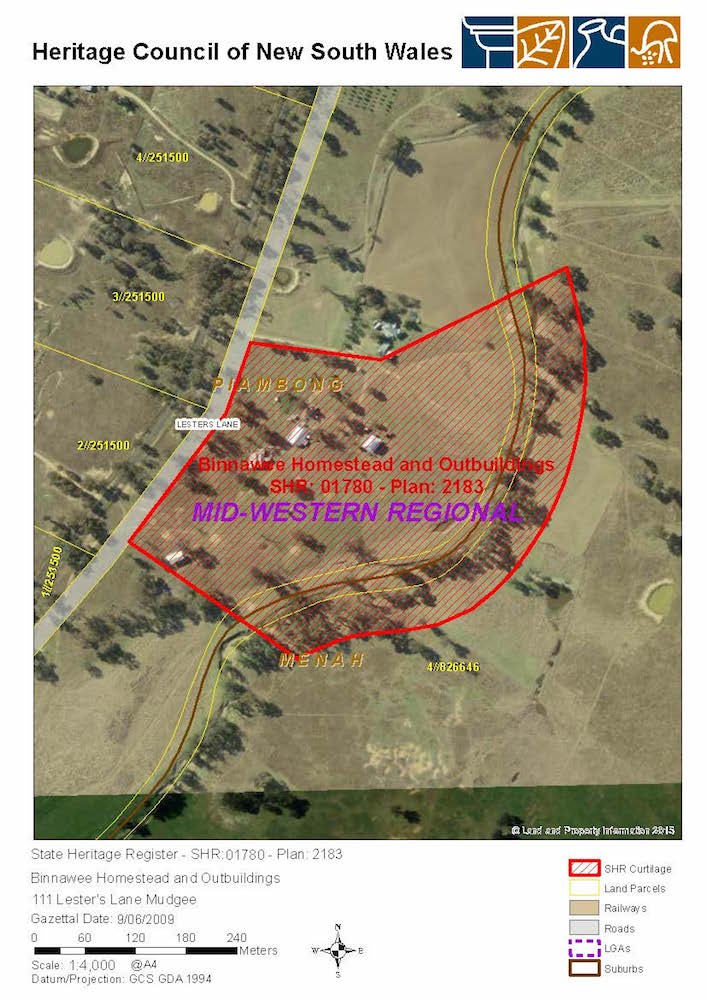
Heritage boundaries

The Binnawee Homestead and Outbuildings are of State significance as a picturesquely diverse yet cohesive group of mid-nineteenth-century rural buildings. This group is representative of the pastoral history of the State, providing evidence of the aspirations and wealth of mid-nineteenth-century graziers, while being rare in its intactness. The homestead building is a fine and rare example of an intact mid 19th century, Georgian two-storey house, while the working outbuildings include stables, shearing shed and working man's cottage and are constructed in a variety of materials, including brick, clay rubble, slab and reinforced concrete. The Binnawee Homestead and Outbuildings are of State significance for their research potential in providing information about mid-nineteenth century building materials and techniques. Also, because the farm has been in constant habitation and use since the early nineteenth century, there is archaeological potential. The homestead especially has retained its integrity since construction while the majority of the homestead's outbuildings remain relatively untouched.

The Binnawee Homestead and Outbuildings are considered to be of local significance for having been owned and/or occupied by many people prominent in local and/ or State affairs. William Lewis, the Blackman brothers, Charles Lester, Bruce Lester and David Lester are prominent local identities. Henry Cox is widely known as a pioneer of Mulgoa and Mudgee, while George Henry Cox, MLA and MLC, was a prominent grazier and one of the longest-serving parliamentarians in NSW history. The Binnawee Homestead and Outbuildings are of social significance to the local Mudgee community as an intact representative of a pioneering farming settlement in the district and a fine early group of buildings. The homestead is the earliest surviving two-storeyed residence in the district and the only one with distinctly Georgian origins.

Binnawee Homestead was listed on the New South Wales State Heritage Register on 9 June 2009 having satisfied the following criteria.

The place is important in demonstrating the course, or pattern, of cultural or natural history in New South Wales.

The Binnawee Homestead and outbuildings are of State significance as a remarkably intact grouping of mid-nineteenth-century rural buildings that represent the pastoral history of the State and evidence the aspirations, rise and wealth of mid-nineteenth-century graziers. The homestead, dated c. 1855, is also of local significance as the earliest surviving two-storeyed house in the Mudgee district.

The place has a strong or special association with a person, or group of persons, of importance of cultural or natural history of New South Wales's history.

The Binnawee Homestead and outbuildings are of local significance for having been owned and/or occupied by many people prominent in local and/ or state affairs. William Lewis, the Blackman brothers, Charles Lester, Bruce Lester and David Lester are prominent local identities. Henry Cox is more widely known as a pioneer of Mulgoa and Mudgee, while George Henry Cox, MLA and MLC, was a prominent grazier and one of the longest serving parliamentarians in NSW history.

The place is important in demonstrating aesthetic characteristics and/or a high degree of creative or technical achievement in New South Wales.

The Binnawee Homestead and outbuildings are of State aesthetic significance firstly for the homestead building, which is a fine and rare example of a mid-19th-century, Georgian two-storey house which is remarkably intact in its architectural design and form. Although based on a standard pattern book design, the symmetrical and asymmetrical attributes of the Homestead are aesthetically pleasing. Secondly, in the immediate vicinity of the homestead there is an intact collection of farming outbuildings constructed in a variety of materials, including brick, clay rubble, slab and reinforced concrete, and which make a picturesquely diverse yet cohesive group of rural buildings.

The place has a strong or special association with a particular community or cultural group in New South Wales for social, cultural or spiritual reasons.

The Binnawee Homestead and outbuildings are of local social significance to the Mudgee community as an intact representative of a pioneering farming settlement in the district.

The place has potential to yield information that will contribute to an understanding of the cultural or natural history of New South Wales.

The Binnawee Homestead and outbuildings are of State significance for their research potential in providing information about mid-nineteenth century building materials and techniques. The relationship of the homestead complex to the nearby Macdonald's Creek - the source of much of its water - may also be a source of research potential. Also, because the farm has been in constant habitation and use since the early nineteenth century, there is high archaeological potential on the site.

The place possesses uncommon, rare or endangered aspects of the cultural or natural history of New South Wales.

The Binnawee homestead building is of State significance for its rarity as a virtually intact, in situ homestead building from the mid-1850s. Its rarity is enhanced by the survival of its accompanying group of working buildings, including stables, shearing shed and working man's cottage, some of which are still in use. It is of local significance for having few equivalents in building medium or style in the greater Central West region. It is the only house in the district to have distinctly Georgian origins.

The place is important in demonstrating the principal characteristics of a class of cultural or natural places/environments in New South Wales.

The Binnawee Homestead and outbuildings are of State significance as highly representative of the pastoral history of the district and state and the aspirations, rise and wealth of the early graziers.
