= Mudgee =

- Town
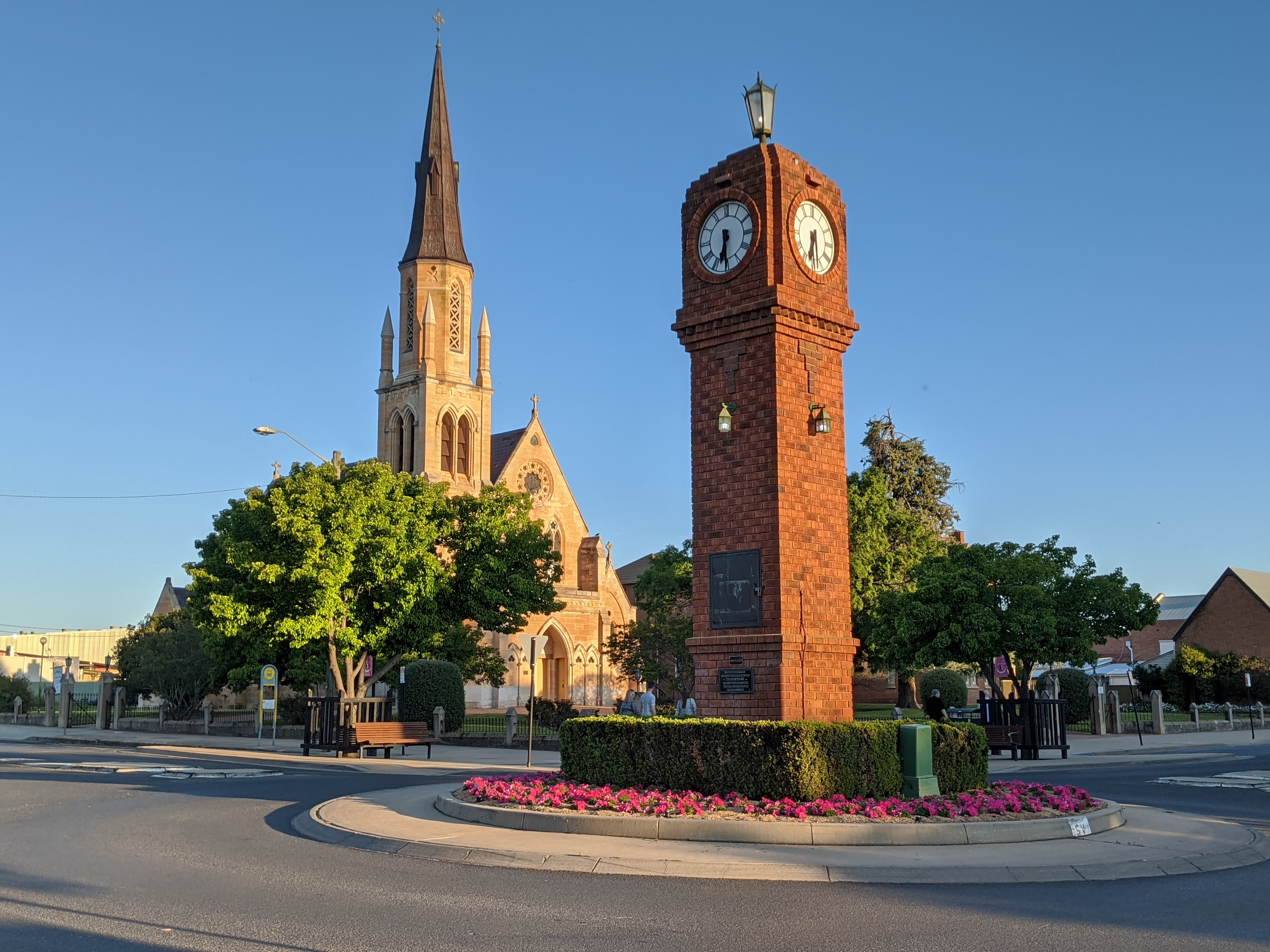
- View of the town centre, showing War Memorial Clock Tower

- Interactive map of Mudgee
- Coordinates: 32°35′43″S 149°35′16″E
- Country: Australia
- State: New South Wales
- Region: Central West
- LGA: Mid-Western Regional Council
- Location: 270 km (170 mi) NW of Sydney; 128 km (80 mi) ESE of Dubbo; 192 km (119 mi) N of Orange; 201 km (125 mi) W of Muswellbrook

Government
  - State electorate: Dubbo
  - Federal division: Calare
- Elevation: 454 m (1,490 ft)

Population
  - Total: 11,457 (2021)
- Postcode: 2850
- County: Wellington
- Mean max temp: 23.0 °C (73.4 °F)
- Mean min temp: 8.3 °C (46.9 °F)
- Annual rainfall: 673.9 mm (26.53 in)

Mudgee (/mʌdʒi/) is a town in the Central West of New South Wales, Australia. It is in the broad fertile Cudgegong River valley 261 km (162 mi) north-west of Sydney and is the largest town in the Mid-Western Regional Council local government area as well as being the council seat. At the 2021 Census, its population was 11,457. The district lies across the edge of the geological structure known as the Sydney Basin.

== History ==
=== Wiradjuri people ===
The Mudgee and Dabee clans of the Wiradjuri people lived at and around the site of what is now the town of Mudgee on the Cudgegong River. Some cultural and tool-making sites of these Aboriginal people remain, including the Hands on the Rocks, The Drip and Babyfoot Cave sites.

==== Significance of local names ====
Many place-names in the region are derived from the original Wiradjuri language, including Mudgee itself, which was named by the Wiradjuri clan who lived there. There are various translations as to what Mudgee means including "resting place", "contented", "nest in the hills" as well as "friend or mate" which the latter coincides with the Wiradjuri word "mudyi". The correct pronunciation has also been recorded as either Moudgee, Moothi or Mougee. Nearby places include Lue (Loowee, 'a chain of waterholes'); Gulgong ('a gully'); Wollar ('a rock water hole'); Menah ('flat country'); Eurunderee ('a local tree'); Guntawang ('a peaceful place'), Cooyal ('dry country'); Wilbertree ('a long switch'); Gooree ('native chasing live animal'); Burrendong ('darker than usual'). The Aboriginal name of the Rylstone area was Combamolang.

=== Early British colonisation (1821 to 1850) ===
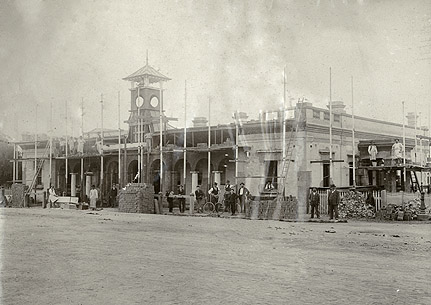
Mudgee post office

James Blackman, leading a small expedition in the latter half of 1821, was the first British colonist to enter the Mudgee district. Not long after, Lieutenant William Lawson who was then commandant of Bathurst, made several further expeditions to Mudgee. Both Blackman and Lawson found the site to be an Aboriginal settlement or bimmel inhabited by around 100 people who called the area Mudgee or Mujjee.

In February 1822, George and Henry Cox, sons of William Cox, followed the trails set up by Blackman and Lawson with 500 head of livestock, and established a grazing property at Menah, 3 km (1.9 mi) north of the current town. The Coxes were soon in conflict with the Mudgee clan who drove away their workers and livestock. George Cox gathered some men at Bathurst and returned to Menah where a two hour fight later ensued, resulting in six Mudgee people being killed and one of Cox's employees being speared to death.

The violence in the region worsened in June 1824, when Theophilus Chamberlain, who was the Coxes' superintendent of their Mudgee property holdings, led a number of punitive expeditions against the local Aboriginal people. A skirmish at Guntawang to the north of Mudgee resulted in some settlers being killed, with around 70 or more Aboriginal people dying in follow up raids. Martial law was declared by Governor Thomas Brisbane in August 1824, leading to further killings of the Wiradjuri people in the Mudgee area. Descendants and workers of the Coxes later described this period as one where "an immense number of natives, men, women and children were slaughtered" and "the bodies of the blacks were piled together and burnt...like old tar barrels". The violence forced the Coxes to abandon Guntawang, and relieving Chamberlain of his duties, they shifted their enterprise to nearby Dabee.

The Cox family remained prominent landholders around Mudgee for many decades, owning the Dabee, Menah and Burrundulla properties. William Lawson and his descendants also continued to be leading pastoralists in the region, holding estates such as Putta Bucca and Havilah.

The site of the Mudgee township was surveyed in 1837 and the first land sales occurred in August 1838. It has been incorrectly claimed that Robert Hoddle designed the village. Although Hoddle was the first surveyor in the region, marking out the boundaries of Putta Bucca and Bombira, by the time the village was gazetted, he had already left the district to become leader of the Port Phillip Survey. John Blackman built a slab hut, the first dwelling in Mudgee and its general store.

By 1841 there were 36 dwellings, three hotels, a hospital, a post office, two stores and an Anglican church. St John's Church of England was consecrated on 6 May 1841. The police station moved from Menah in the mid-1840s and an Anglican school was established in that decade.

=== 1850 to present ===
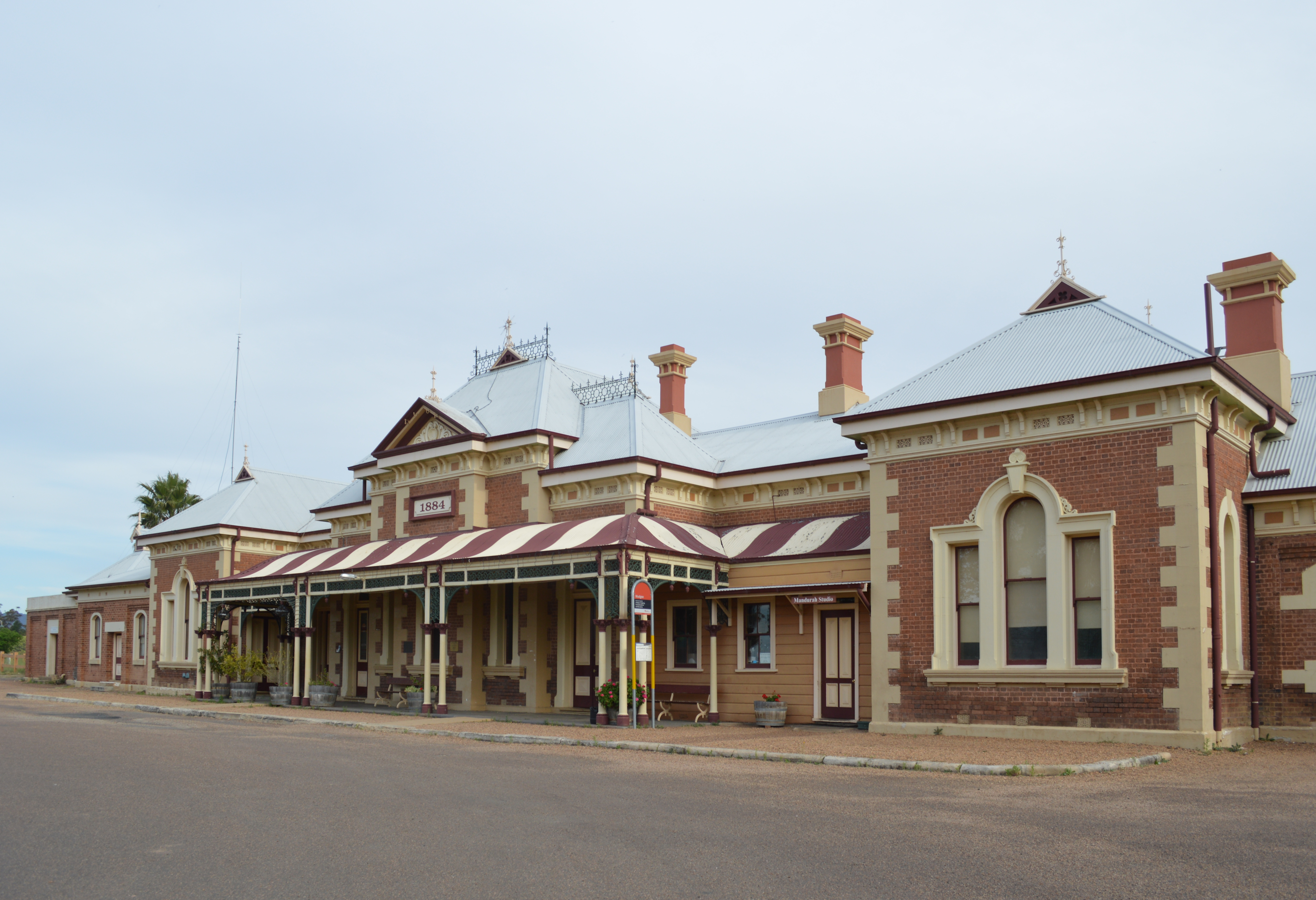
Mudgee Railway Station (1884)

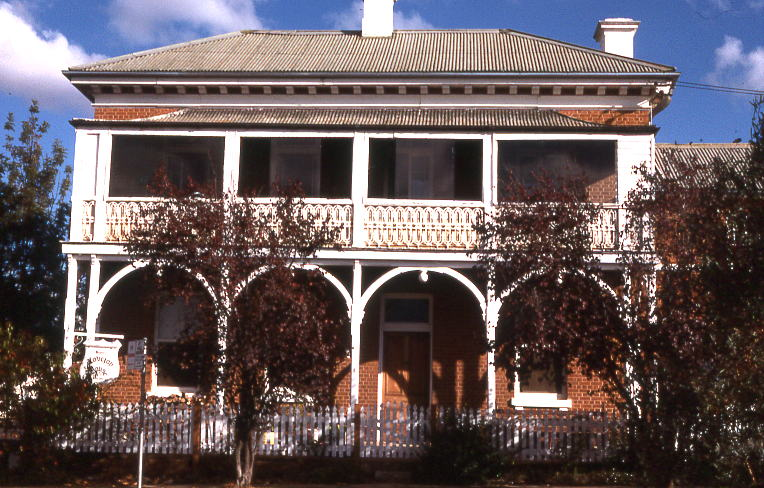
Lovejoy House

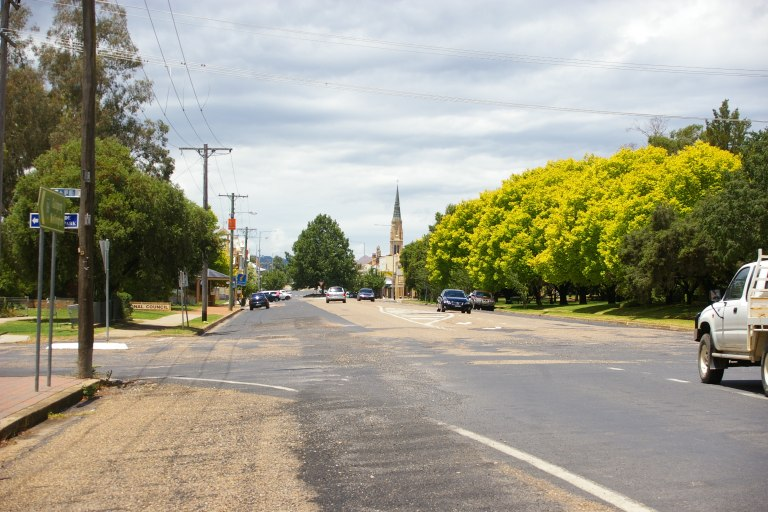
View of Market Street, looking towards the centre of the town

In 1851 the population of Mudgee was 200. This skyrocketed with the discovery of gold by Edward Hargraves in nearby Hargraves, leading to a gold rush. While no gold was found in Mudgee itself, the town is central to the goldfields of Gulgong, Hill End and Windeyer, and grew rapidly as a result.

Mudgee was declared as a municipality in 1860 making it the second oldest municipality west of the Great Dividing Range with a population of 1500 in 1861. A public school was built in the 1850s together with the present Anglican, Catholic Methodist and Presbyterian churches. A new police station, courthouse, Mechanics' Institute and a town hall were built in the 1860s. There were four coach factories operating in Mudgee to cater for the demand of the nearby goldfields. The National Trust of Australia has a number of these buildings registered including the Mudgee Museum (formerly the Colonial Inn), the Catholic presbytery, the court house, the police station and the Anglican Church. On 1 June 1861 the Electric Telegraph system arrived and was opened for messages to be transmitted and received at the Telegraph office.

One gold miner attracted to the Mudgee district was Niels Peter Larsen, who married Louisa Albury in Mudgee in 1866. They were the parents of leading Australian poet Henry Lawson, born in Grenfell in 1867, and changed their names to Peter and Louisa Lawson. By the birth of their third child, they moved to a selection at Pipeclay (now Eurunderee) 8 km (5 mi) north of Mudgee. The site is now a rest stop with a plaque.

Louisa Lawson's vigorous lobbying led to the establishment of the slab-and-bark Eurunderee Public School in 1876 with Henry Lawson first attending aged nine. He would later write about the school in his poem, The Old Bark School. Lawson later attended St. Matthews Central School, Mudgee before progressively worsening deafness led to him leaving school at 14. He lived in the region until age 15 and many of his stories were written about the district.

Tiny diamonds were sometimes found and discarded by gold panners when "washing off", but sometime before June 1869 a larger specimen was found on the banks of the Cudgegong River about 40 km (25 mi) from Mudgee and appraised by the jeweller George Crisp, of Queen Street, Melbourne, at 22.2 carat. Dubbed the "Mudgee diamond", it was the largest found to that date in Australia, however commercial quantities were not found and companies founded to exploit the discoveries were wound up a few years later.

As the gold petered out in the latter half of the 19th century, Mudgee was sustained by both its wool industry and a nascent wine industry founded by a German immigrant, Adam Roth, in the 1850s. The opening of the railway extension from Rylstone to Mudgee occurred on 10 September 1884.

The railway boosted the town's agriculture. The extension between Rylstone and Mudgee closed on 2 March 1992. This same section re-opened eight years later, on 2 September 2000 and closed again in 2007. The Wallaby Track Drive Tour visits various sites associated with Lawson including the old Eurundee Public School, the Henry Lawson memorial, the Budgee Budgee Inn, Sapling Gully, Golden Gully and the Albury Pub which was owned by Lawson's grandfather.

In 1890 a local newspaper was founded with the title the Mudgee Guardian and North-Western Representative. Its title changed in 1963 to the Mudgee Guardian and Gulgong Advertiser and is currently published twice a week.

Mudgee's Glen Willow Regional Sports Stadium hosted the 2012 City vs Country Origin rugby league match with an attendance of 8,621, and the 2017 match with an attendance of 8,322. The St. George Dragons regularly host home matches there.

Additionally, in the A-League, the Western Sydney based Western Sydney Wanderers have chosen to take their Community Round match to Mudgee's Glen Willow Regional Sports Stadium, as part of their new Regional Strategy,

In 2014, the local council found itself involved in a statewide corruption investigation when officers of the Independent Commission Against Corruption (New South Wales) raided the local council's offices.

== Economy ==
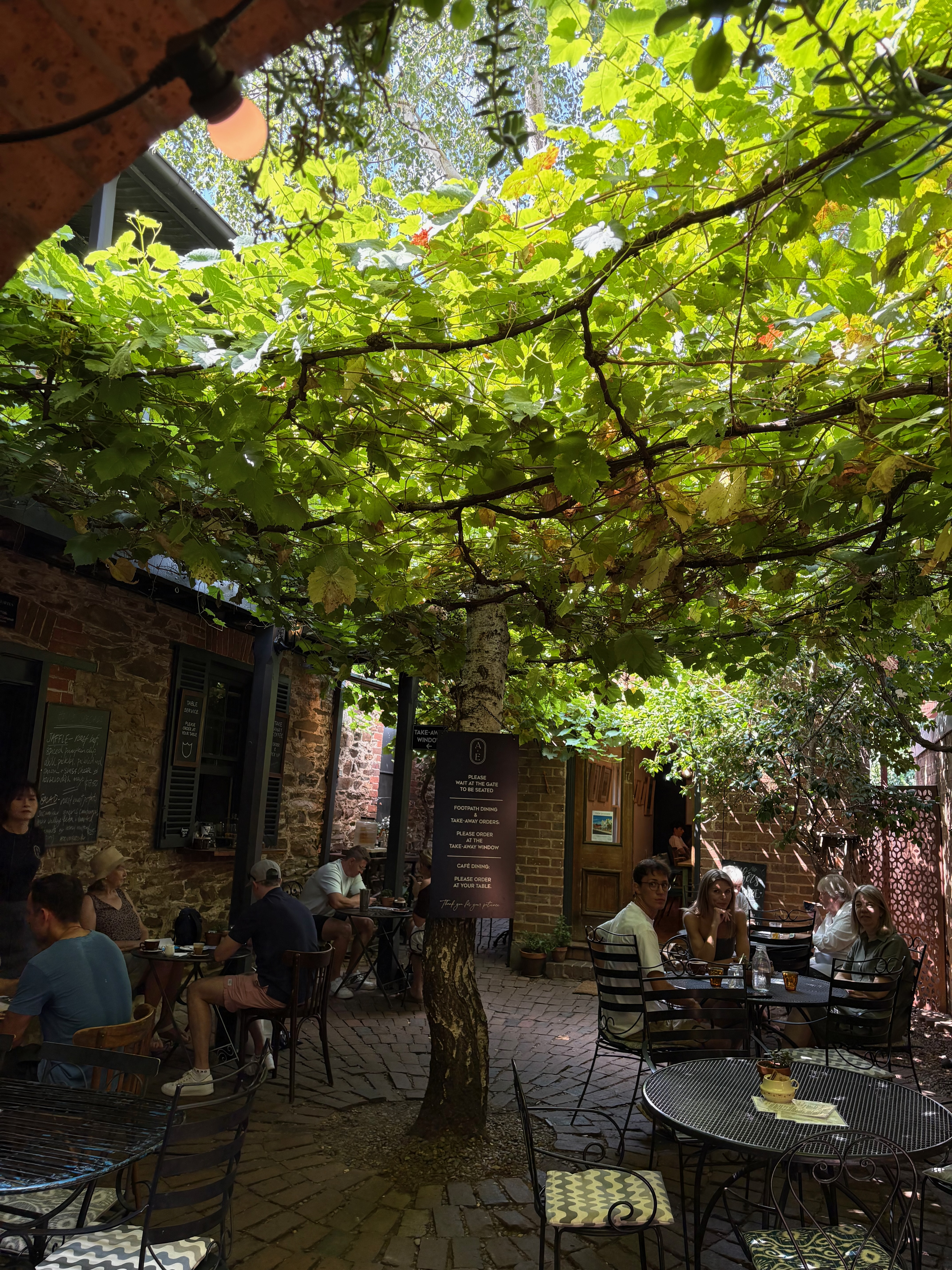
Alleyway Cafe in Mudgee NSW

Mudgee has developed as a wine producing region, it has manufacturing and repair industries. It is also heavily dependent on several major mines in the surrounding area and fly-in fly-out (FIFO) miners who live in the town but work elsewhere.

Other rural produce includes cattle, sheep, wheat, alfalfa, olives, fruit, tomatoes, sweetcorn, honey, alpacas and dairy products. These, however, do not play as large a role as mining.

The Ulan coal mines are in the district and it also produces marble, pottery clays, shale and dolomite. These mines have further potential to expand in the region, however they attract environmental protests.

Local real estate, petrol and living costs skyrocketed since 2010 when the mining boom began to peak. This has rolled onto the local population, who have since had increased difficulty in living in the town.

== Media ==
=== Radio ===
Radio stations that broadcast to Mudgee are ABC Central West and local commercial stations 2MG and Real FM, which are part of the Super Radio Network.

=== Television ===
Mudgee receives the following free-to-air television stations:

- Seven, 7two, 7mate, 7flix, 7Bravo – Seven Network owned and operated station channels.
- 10, 10 Drama, 10 Comedy, Nickelodeon, News24 Regional – Network 10 owned and operated station channels.
- WIN Television, 9Go!, 9Gem, 9Life – Nine Network affiliated channels.
- Special Broadcasting Service, SBS, SBS2, SBS Food, SBS WorldWatch, SBS World Movies, NITV
- ABC Television, ABC, ABC Family, ABC Kids, ABC Entertains, ABC News.

=== Newspapers ===
The Mudgee Guardian is local newspaper which is available on print and online.

== Demographics ==
According to the 2021 Census:

- Mudgee had a population of 11,457, consisting of 5,538 males (48.8%) and 5,868 females (51.2%) and the median age was 36.
- 864 (7.5%) stated that they were Aboriginal/Torres Strait Islander, 9,996 (87.2%) stated they were non-Indigenous.
- 9,586 (86%) stated they were born in Australia. The other top responses were England (2.1%), New Zealand (0.9%), Philippines (0.5%), India (0.4%) and Nepal (0.4%).
- 56.5% are Christian, with Catholic (24%) and Anglican (18.9%) being the two largest denominations. People with no religion accounted for 37.8%.
- English is the primary language used at home with 89.7% stating that they only used it. Languages other than English accounted for 6.4% with the top languages being, Nepali (0.4%), Punjabi (0.4%), Tagalog (0.3%), Spanish (0.3%) and Mandarin (0.3%).
- The weekly median household income was $1,678.

== Sports ==
=== Rugby League ===
- The Mudgee Dragons compete in the Western Premiership, formerly Group 10. Since the competitions re-organization in 2022, the Dragons have made two Grand Finals, winning in 2024, 46–16 over Parkes. The club also has women's and reserves teams. They play out of Glen Willow Regional Sports Stadium
- Mudgee hosted the 2017 City vs Country Origin game. At the time, it was announced that this would be the last year that this competition, dating back to 1928, would be held. City won 20–10.
- In 2025, an NRL game between the Canberra Raiders and Penrith Panthers held at Glen Willow saw a game winning field goal kick by Penrith hit the post, before Canberra returned it the whole way to the Panther's end to win the game. Many dubbed it the 'Miracle in Mudgee'

=== Horse Racing ===
Mudgee Race Club conducts eight race meetings each year at Mudgee Racecourse, including the Mudgee Cup in December, the Charity Shield race day in February and the Gooree Cup. The Mudgee Cup is a qualifying race for The Big Dance at Royal Randwick racecourse, increasing the exposure for the town's annual feature race with the statewide country racing series.

The Mudgee Racecourse has also hosted several editions of the Central Districts qualifier for the Country Championships. In addition to the Mudgee Race Club's race calendar, the venue hosts the historic Bligh Picnic Races.

=== Rugby Union ===
- The Mudgee Wombats, founded in 1874, play in the New Holland Agriculture Cup, tier two of the Central West Rugby Union. The Wombats won the 2024 premiership. Their home ground is Jubilee Oval.

== Climate ==
Mudgee has a humid subtropical climate (Cfa), with semi-arid (Bsk) characteristics. Summers are hot with many severe thunderstorms. Winters are relatively cold, with frosty mornings and mostly sunny days, interspersed with periods of rain and, rarely, snow; Mudgee's heaviest snowfall on record was 1 ft 10 in (56 cm) on 5 July 1900. Rainfall is moderate and falls fairly evenly all year round, with a slight peak in summer. Extreme temperatures have ranged from −8.3 °C (17.1 °F) up to 43.9 °C (111.0 °F). The highest monthly rainfall ever recorded was 303.2 mm (11.94 in) in March 1926. Mudgee gets 113 clear days, annually. On 10 June 2021, snowfall was reported in Mudgee, where residents woke to snow-covered landscapes following a widespread cold outbreak across south-eastern Australia.

Climate data for Mudgee Airport (1991–2020 normals, extremes 1962–present)
Month	Jan	Feb	Mar	Apr	May	Jun	Jul	Aug	Sep	Oct	Nov	Dec	Year
Record high °C (°F)	42.5 (108.5)	43.9 (111.0)	38.3 (100.9)	34.5 (94.1)	27.2 (81.0)	22.8 (73.0)	23.6 (74.5)	26.8 (80.2)	32.5 (90.5)	38.2 (100.8)	42.5 (108.5)	42.7 (108.9)	43.9 (111.0)
Mean maximum °C (°F)	38.3 (100.9)	36.3 (97.3)	32.8 (91.0)	28.3 (82.9)	23.6 (74.5)	19.3 (66.7)	19.3 (66.7)	22.0 (71.6)	27.3 (81.1)	30.6 (87.1)	34.7 (94.5)	35.8 (96.4)	39.4 (102.9)
Mean daily maximum °C (°F)	31.1 (88.0)	29.4 (84.9)	26.8 (80.2)	23.0 (73.4)	18.6 (65.5)	15.0 (59.0)	14.6 (58.3)	16.3 (61.3)	19.7 (67.5)	23.2 (73.8)	26.5 (79.7)	28.9 (84.0)	22.8 (73.0)
Daily mean °C (°F)	23.7 (74.7)	22.6 (72.7)	19.8 (67.6)	15.5 (59.9)	11.3 (52.3)	8.7 (47.7)	7.9 (46.2)	8.9 (48.0)	12.0 (53.6)	15.5 (59.9)	18.9 (66.0)	21.4 (70.5)	15.5 (59.9)
Mean daily minimum °C (°F)	16.2 (61.2)	15.7 (60.3)	12.8 (55.0)	8.0 (46.4)	4.0 (39.2)	2.4 (36.3)	1.1 (34.0)	1.5 (34.7)	4.3 (39.7)	7.8 (46.0)	11.3 (52.3)	13.8 (56.8)	8.2 (46.8)
Mean minimum °C (°F)	9.4 (48.9)	9.0 (48.2)	5.5 (41.9)	1.3 (34.3)	−2.8 (27.0)	−4.3 (24.3)	−4.6 (23.7)	−4.1 (24.6)	−1.7 (28.9)	0.9 (33.6)	4.1 (39.4)	6.5 (43.7)	−5.5 (22.1)
Record low °C (°F)	3.4 (38.1)	4.0 (39.2)	1.5 (34.7)	−3.7 (25.3)	−5.8 (21.6)	−7.5 (18.5)	−8.3 (17.1)	−6.4 (20.5)	−4.4 (24.1)	−2.3 (27.9)	0.2 (32.4)	2.0 (35.6)	−8.3 (17.1)
Average rainfall mm (inches)	66.2 (2.61)	64.3 (2.53)	62.3 (2.45)	36.3 (1.43)	36.7 (1.44)	42.9 (1.69)	43.4 (1.71)	34.4 (1.35)	54.4 (2.14)	50.6 (1.99)	72.3 (2.85)	79.0 (3.11)	642.8 (25.3)
Average rainy days (≥ 1 mm)	5.6	5.1	5.2	2.7	4	5.5	5.3	4	4.9	5.5	6.3	6.1	60.2
Average afternoon relative humidity (%) (at 3 pm)	37	42	42	41	49	57	55	47	44	41	40	37	44
Average dew point °C (°F)	11.4 (52.5)	12.5 (54.5)	10.4 (50.7)	6.8 (44.2)	6.0 (42.8)	5.0 (41.0)	3.9 (39.0)	3.1 (37.6)	4.9 (40.8)	5.9 (42.6)	7.9 (46.2)	9.4 (48.9)	7.3 (45.1)
Source: Bureau of Meteorology (Dew point for 3pm, extremes include George Street station)

== Heritage buildings ==
Mudgee has a number of heritage-listed sites, including:

- 5–7 Church Street: Regent Theatre
- 13 Church Street: St Mary's Roman Catholic Church
- 64 Market Street: Mudgee Town Hall
- 80 Market Street: Mudgee Post Office
- 111 Lester's Lane: Binnawee Homestead
- Wallerawang-Gwabegar railway: Mudgee railway station

== Churches ==
- St John's Anglican Church
- St Mary's Catholic Church
- St Paul's Presbyterian Church
- Mudgee Uniting Church
- Frontline Assemblies of God
- Mudgee Baptist Church
- Salvation Army
- Seventh Day Adventist Church
- One Life Church Mudgee

== Schools and colleges ==
- Cudgegong Valley Public School
- Mudgee High School
- Mudgee Public School
- St Matthews Catholic School
- Mudgee College (TAFE)

== Gallery ==
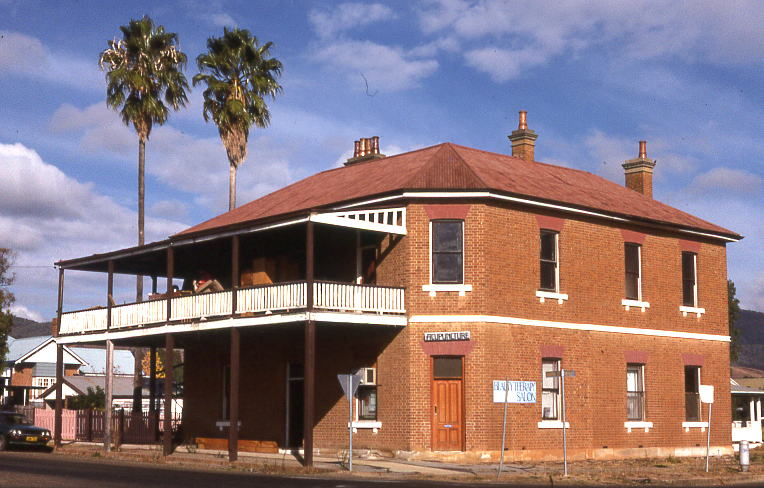
Commercial building in town

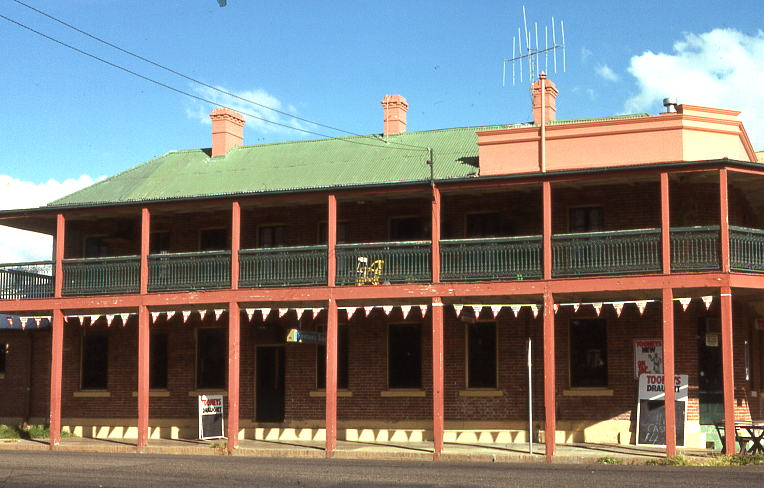
Lawson Park Hotel

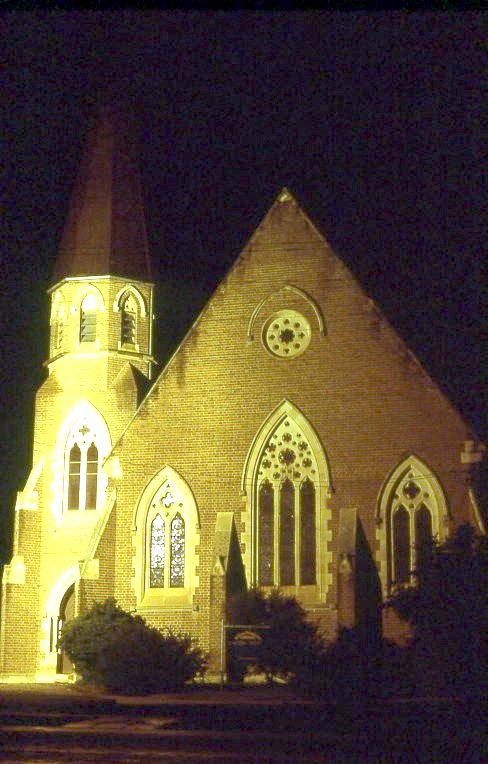
Presbyterian Church at night

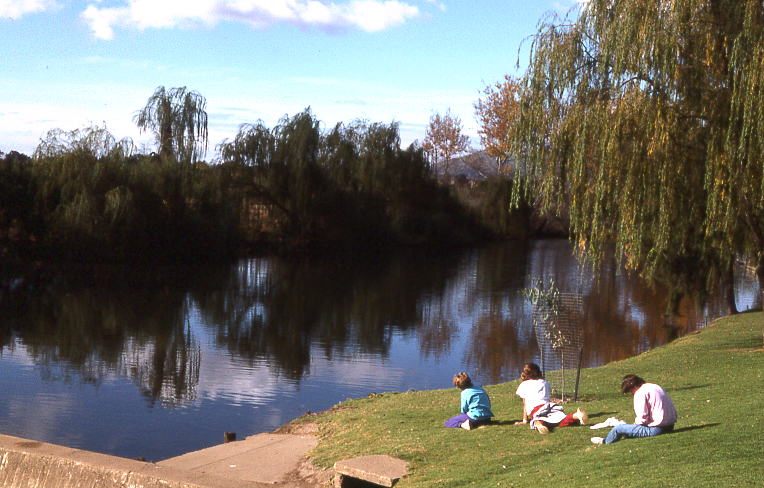
Cudgegong River where it passes close to the town

Historical population
Year	Pop.	±%
1921	3,170	—
1933	3,993	+26.0%
1947	4,178	+4.6%
1954	5,294	+26.7%
1961	5,312	+0.3%
1966	5,372	+1.1%
1971	5,598	+4.2%
1976	5,724	+2.3%
1981	6,015	+5.1%
1986	6,576	+9.3%
1991	7,447	+13.2%
1996	8,195	+10.0%
2001	8,603	+5.0%
2006	8,249	−4.1%
2011	9,830	+19.2%
2016	10,966	+11.6%
2021	11,563	+5.4%
Source: Australian Bureau of Statistics data.

== Notable people ==
- Natarsha Belling – national newsreader for Channel 10
- Felicity Brown – milliner
- Kathleen Mary Burrow – physiotherapist, businesswoman and Catholic lay leader
- Ivan Dougherty – Australian army officer, who attended Mudgee High School in his youth
- Jamie Fitzgerald – former professional rugby league footballer who played 71 First Grade NRL games
- John Floreani – Lead singer of rock band Trophy Eyes and solo singer-songwriter
- Kevin Golsby – actor, radio and television host
- Darrell Hair – international cricket umpire
- Lisa Keightley – cricketer, first woman to score a century at Lord's in England
- Henry Lawson – one of Australia's most recognised poets and short story writers. Lived in Mudgee for 16 years during childhood after his birth in Grenfell.
- Louisa Lawson – mother of Henry Lawson and prolific activist
- David Lowe – Winemaker and owner Lowe Wines, President NSW Wine Industry Association, Vice President Australian Winemakers Federation
- The Massey family of organists — born in the town and returned frequently
- Scott McGregor – Australian actor, TV presenter and railway historian
- Ted Noffs – Methodist minister and founder of the Wayside Chapel in Kings Cross 1964
- James Stanton – Olympic water polo player for Australia.
- Ken Sutcliffe – television personality, sports reader for Channel Nine
- Dennis Talbot – professional boxer who represented Australia in the 1972 Olympics in Munich
- Gil Wahlquist – pioneer organic winemaker and owner of Botobolar Vineyard
- YNG Martyr – rapper and singer/songwriter, also runs a music marketing company

Groups

- Brothers3 – X-Factor contestants, 2014

== See also ==
- Mudgee Airport
