= Mudgee Town Hall =

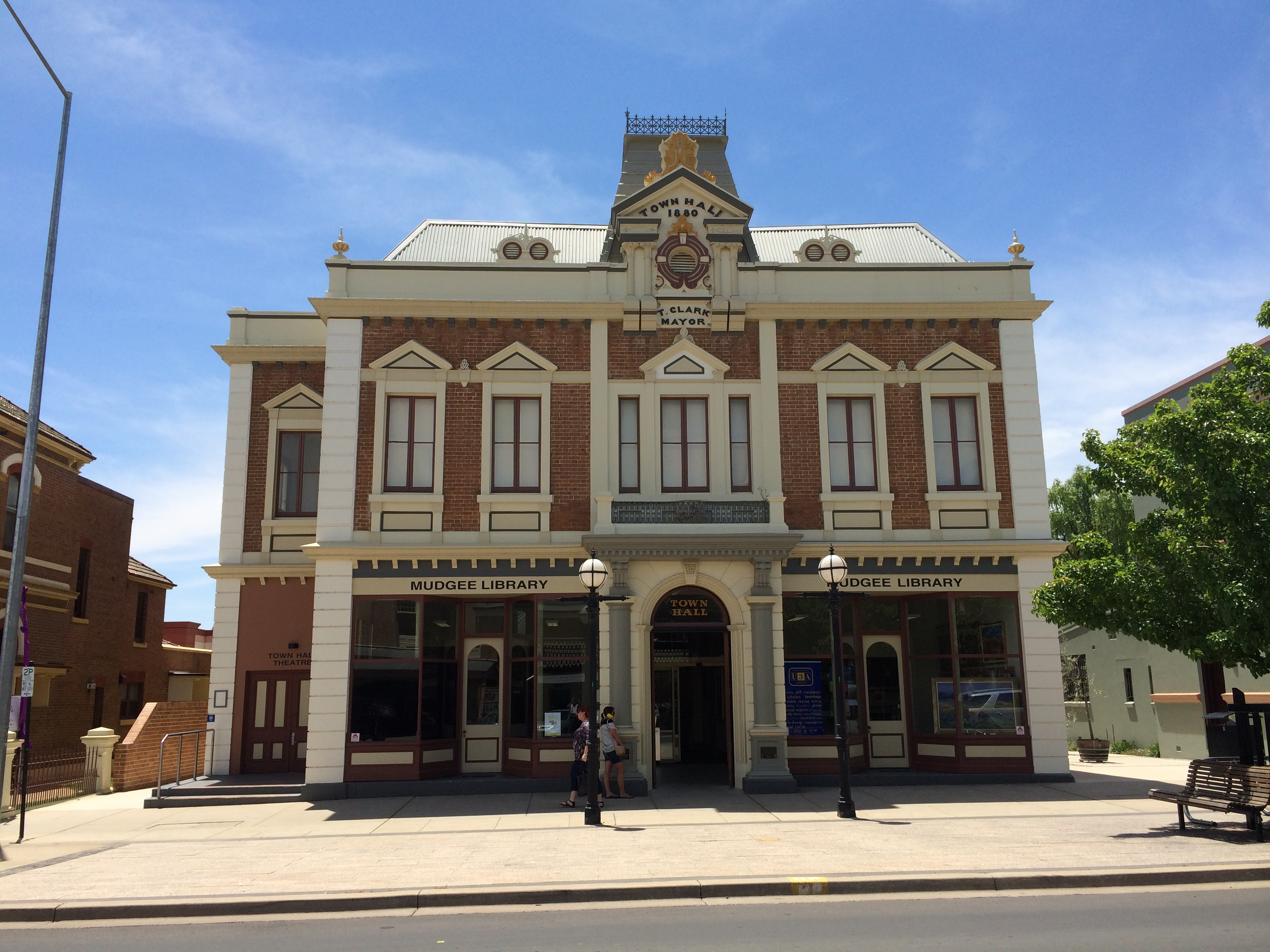

- Location within New South Wales Location within Australia
- 32.5905°S 149.5872°E
- Location: 64 Market Street, Mudgee, Mid-Western Regional Council, New South Wales, Australia

Site notes
- Owner: Mid-Western Regional Council

New South Wales Heritage Register
- Official name: Mudgee Town Hall
- Type: state heritage (built)
- Designated: 2 April 1999
- Reference no.: 464
- Type: Hall Town Hall
- Category: Community Facilities

Mudgee Town Hall is a heritage-listed former town hall and now library and theatre at 64 Market Street, Mudgee, Mid-Western Regional Council, New South Wales, Australia. The property is owned by Mid-Western Regional Council. It was added to the New South Wales State Heritage Register on 2 April 1999.

== History ==
The town hall was built in 1880 under then-Mayor T. Clark.

The building was severely damaged by fire in 1978, after which the Mudgee Shire Council vacated the building, moving to the former Cudgegong Council Chambers for eighteen months while new premises were built. It was renovated in 1978-79 at a cost of $100,000, and the Mudgee Library moved into the Town Hall from its former premises in the Mechanics' Institute in 1979.

In c. 1980, the ground floor was sympathetically altered to provide shop fronts connected with increased tourist amenities.

It was extensively renovated in 2012-13, extending the building so as to double the library space and adding new equipment and furniture for the theatre.

In 2018, it contains the local library and theatre, with the theatre doubling as the Town Hall Cinema, showing new release films one weekend a month.

== Description ==
The former Mudgee Town Hall is a highly significant 19th municipal building located in Market Street, the centre of Mudgee's business and commercial precinct. The building also forms part of a significant group of historic buildings on the northern side of Market Street that make a strong architectural contribution to the streetscape and the centre of Mudgee. The finely designed Neoclassical building served as the Town Hall until the 1970s. Importantly the public use of the building has continued with its adaptation to a library and theatre and remains today an important place in the social life of this rural town.

The building is small two-storey town hall, neo-classic in style, having stuccoed pediments to windows and the elaborate central roof gable containing the date and name plaque and ventilator. The structure is of brick with stuccoed quoins, window surrounds and central balcony – porch. A small mansard roof of corrugated iron is set behind a low parapet at the front and is surmounted by a flagpole turret with cast iron crestings.

== Heritage listing ==
Mudgee Town Hall was listed on the New South Wales State Heritage Register on 2 April 1999.
