= St Matthews Catholic School Mudgee =

School in New South Wales, Australia

Location
- Mudgee, New South Wales; 2850; Australia; 32°35′33″S 149°35′24″E

Information
- Type: Independent systemic, co-educational
- Motto: Truth and Excellence will Prevail
- Denomination: Catholic
- Patron saint: St Matthew
- Oversight: Roman Catholic Diocese of Bathurst
- Staff: 45 (2025)
- Teaching staff: 77.1 FTE (2025)
- Age range: Kindergarten to Year 12
- Enrollment: 1122 (2025)
- Campus: Primary: 4 Lewis Street, Mudgee (Kindergarten to Year 6); Secondary: 68 Bruce Road, Mudgee (Year 7 to Year 12)
- Website: St Matthews Catholic School
- Building details

General information
- Construction started: 28 April 1912
- Opened: 14 August 1916
- Inaugurated: 1916
- Cost: £6300

St Matthew's Catholic School is a co-educational Catholic school located in Mudgee in central west NSW. The school operates a primary campus on Lewis Street, whilst also operating a secondary campus on Bruce Road.

== History ==
A Catholic school was first established in Mudgee in the 19th century. Leading Australian writer and poet Henry Lawson attended the school for a short time but struggled to find friends due to deafness and left school early.

A new school in Mudgee south was finished in April 1912. The same week tenders were called for a new Catholic School. In July, 1914 tenders were called for a new high school building which was completed in 1916.

In 1992, part of the school was burnt down by vandals. A new school was rebuilt on the site.

== Campuses ==
Saint Matthews operates two campuses within Mudgee. The primary campus in Mudgee CBD is the site of the original school and offers education for students in kindergarten to year 6. The secondary campus offers education for students in year 7 to year 12, and was opened in 2023.
