= Mudgee Post Office =

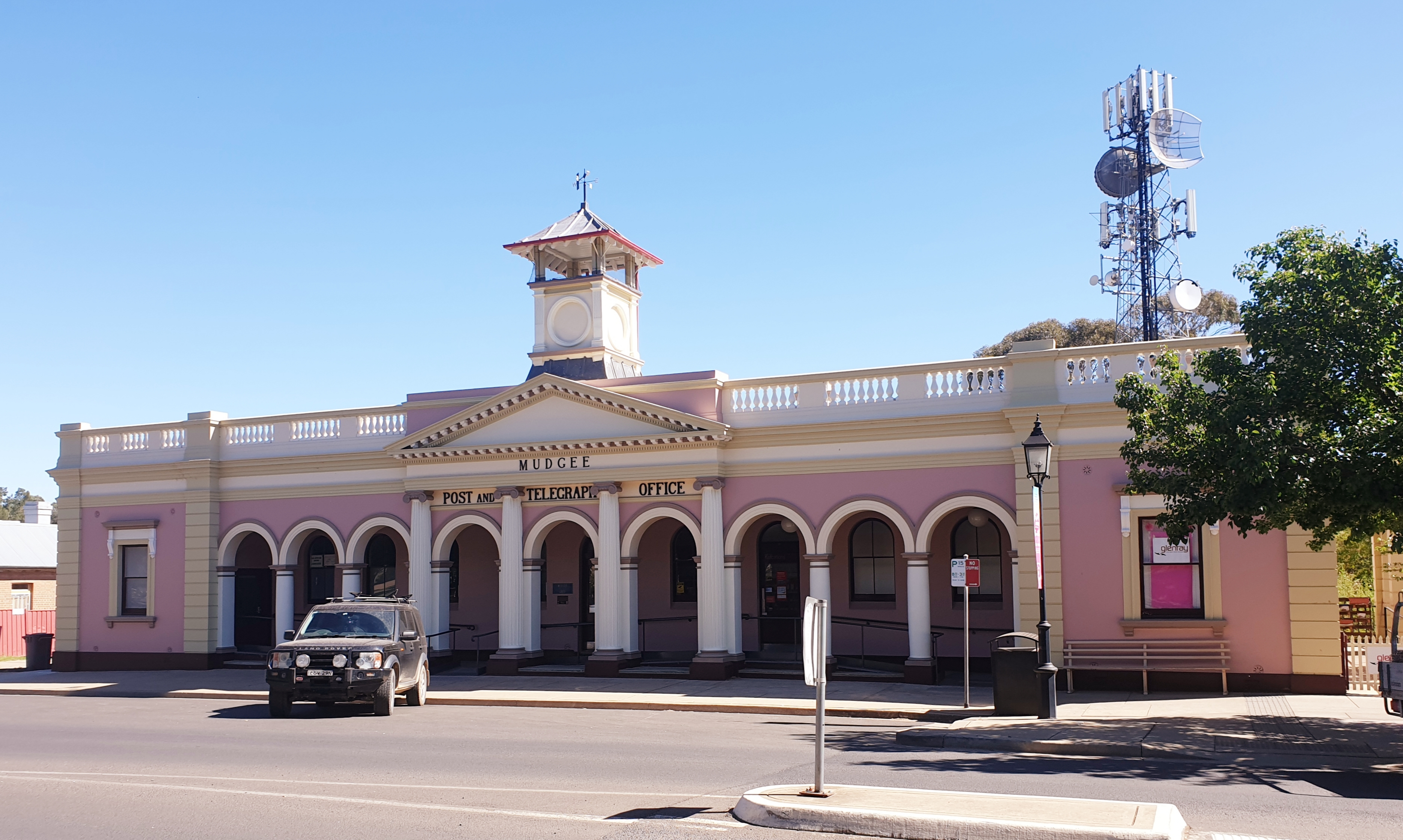

- Location within New South Wales Location within Australia
- 32.5904°S 149.5858°E
- Location: 80 Market Street, Mudgee, Mid-Western Regional Council, New South Wales, Australia

History
- Built: 1862–

Site notes
- Architect: NSW Colonial Architect's Office under Alexander Dawson. 1902 addition – Walter Liberty Vernon.
- Owner: Australia Post

New South Wales Heritage Register
- Official name: Mudgee Post Office & Quarters
- Type: state heritage (built)
- Designated: 17 December 1999
- Reference no.: 1314
- Type: Post Office
- Category: Postal and Telecommunications

Mudgee Post Office is a heritage-listed post office at 80 Market Street, Mudgee, Mid-Western Regional Council, New South Wales, Australia. It was designed by Alexander Dawson and built in 1862, with 1902 additions designed by Walter Liberty Vernon. The property is owned by Australia Post. It was added to the New South Wales State Heritage Register on 17 December 1999.

== History ==
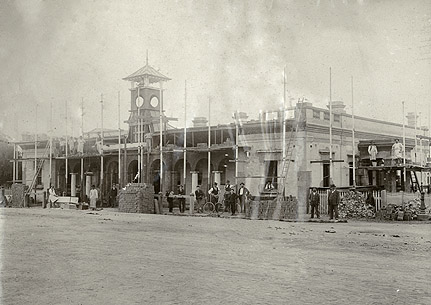
Construction work on Mudgee Post Office

Early postal services operated from a number of local stores and other premises until mid-1861 when the Colonial Architect Alexander Dawson designed a telegraph office and residence on the northwest corner of Market and Perry Streets. The Post Office operated for a period from the rear of this building and in May 1875 a separate post office building was built adjacent to the Telegraph Office in probably a reverse image of the original building.

Alterations occurred in 1886 but in 1902 major remodelling and alterations were carried out by the Public Works Department, which included the design and construction of the colonnade and clocktower. The 1902 works appear to be the work of Government Architect Walter Liberty Vernon. A proposal to install a weight-operated clock did not proceed and in 1914 another effort was made to install a clock without success.

== Description ==
A symmetrical, single-storey stuccoed brick composition in the Victorian Free Classical style. The arched colonnade has both doric and ionic derived columns and is flanked by projecting single bays in the Palladian manner. The end bays have moulded rectangular windows enhanced with quoining in rendered brick. Arched windows and doorways are located within the colonnade.

A classically-styled rendered balustrade extends across the parapet. The three central bays of the colonnade have a classical pediment and parapet surmounted by a small central belltower.

The physical condition of the building was reported as good as at 1 December 1999. The integrity of the building is good, although tower is defaced by telecommunications apparatus.

== Heritage listing ==
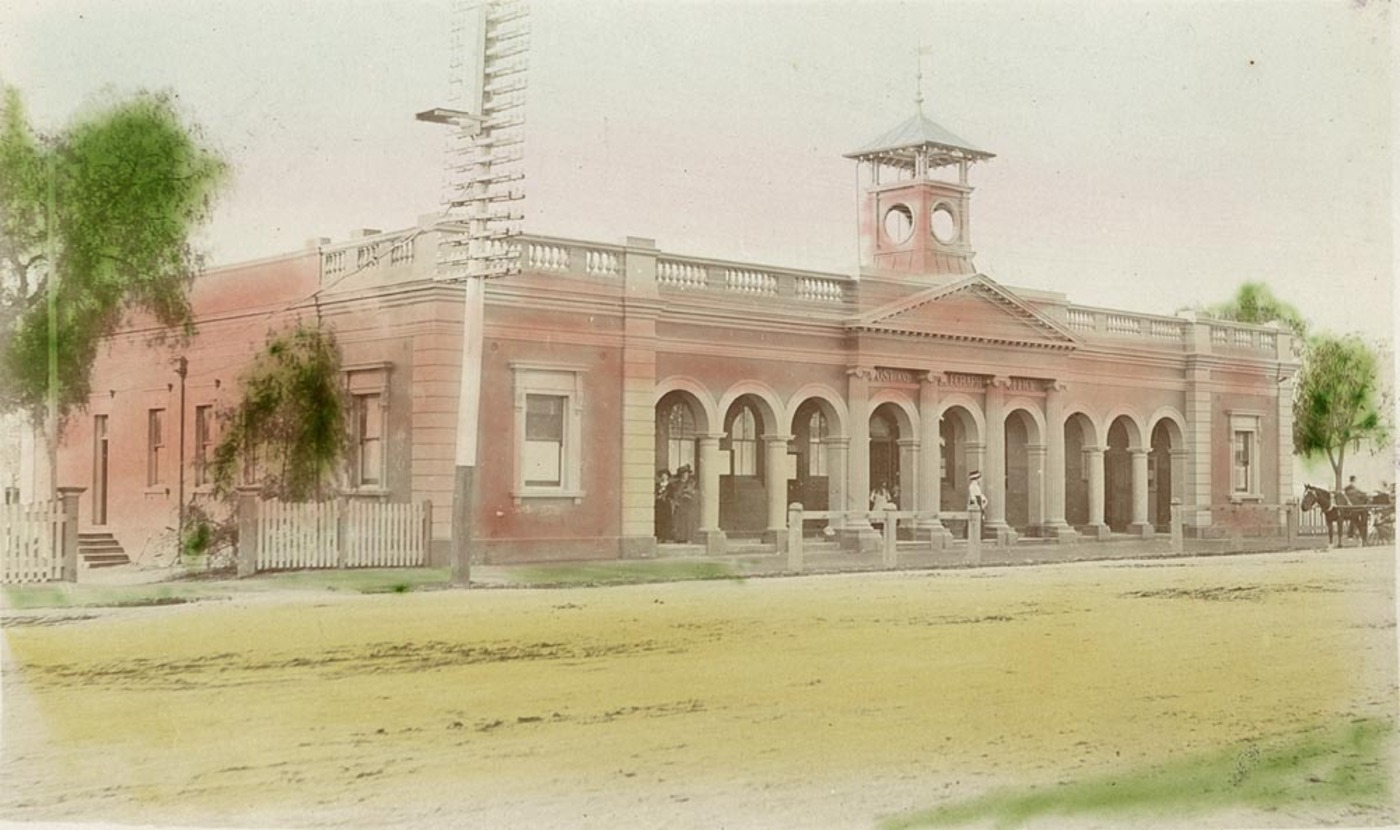
Mudgee Post Office, circa 1920s

The Mudgee Post Office and Quarters is significant as one of the first major country post offices built in the state. It is a fine civic building skilfully remodelled from its original c. 1860 Palladian form to the Victorian Free Classical style seen today. The form of the building is unusual in post office design and is expressive of the building's early date.

The building is a key streetscape element within the western precinct of Market Street and forms part of an important group which includes the Police Station, former Cudgegong Council Chambers and Court House to the west.

Mudgee Post Office was listed on the New South Wales State Heritage Register on 17 December 1999 having satisfied the following criteria.

The place is important in demonstrating the course, or pattern, of cultural or natural history in New South Wales.

The Mudgee Post Office and Quarters building is one of the first major, country post offices built in the State. It is associated with Colonial Architect Dawson and Government Architect Vernon.

The place is important in demonstrating aesthetic characteristics and/or a high degree of creative or technical achievement in New South Wales.

This Victorian Free Classical styled building with its Palladian pavilions is unusual in post office design in New South Wales.

The building is a key streetscape element within the western precinct of Market Street and forms part of an important group which includes the Police Station, former Cudgegong Chambers and Court House to the west.

The place has strong or special association with a particular community or cultural group in New South Wales for social, cultural or spiritual reasons.

As a prominent civic building, the Mudgee Post Office is considered to be significant to the Mudgee community's sense of place.

The place has potential to yield information that will contribute to an understanding of the cultural or natural history of New South Wales.

The site has the potential to contain an archaeological resource, which may provide information relating to the previous use of the site, and to use by the Post Office.

The place possesses uncommon, rare or endangered aspects of the cultural or natural history of New South Wales.

A rare style of post office building in New South Wales.

The place is important in demonstrating the principal characteristics of a class of cultural or natural places/environments in New South Wales.

Part of the group of post offices in NSW. Representative of the work of Dawson and Vernon.
