= Mudgee High School =

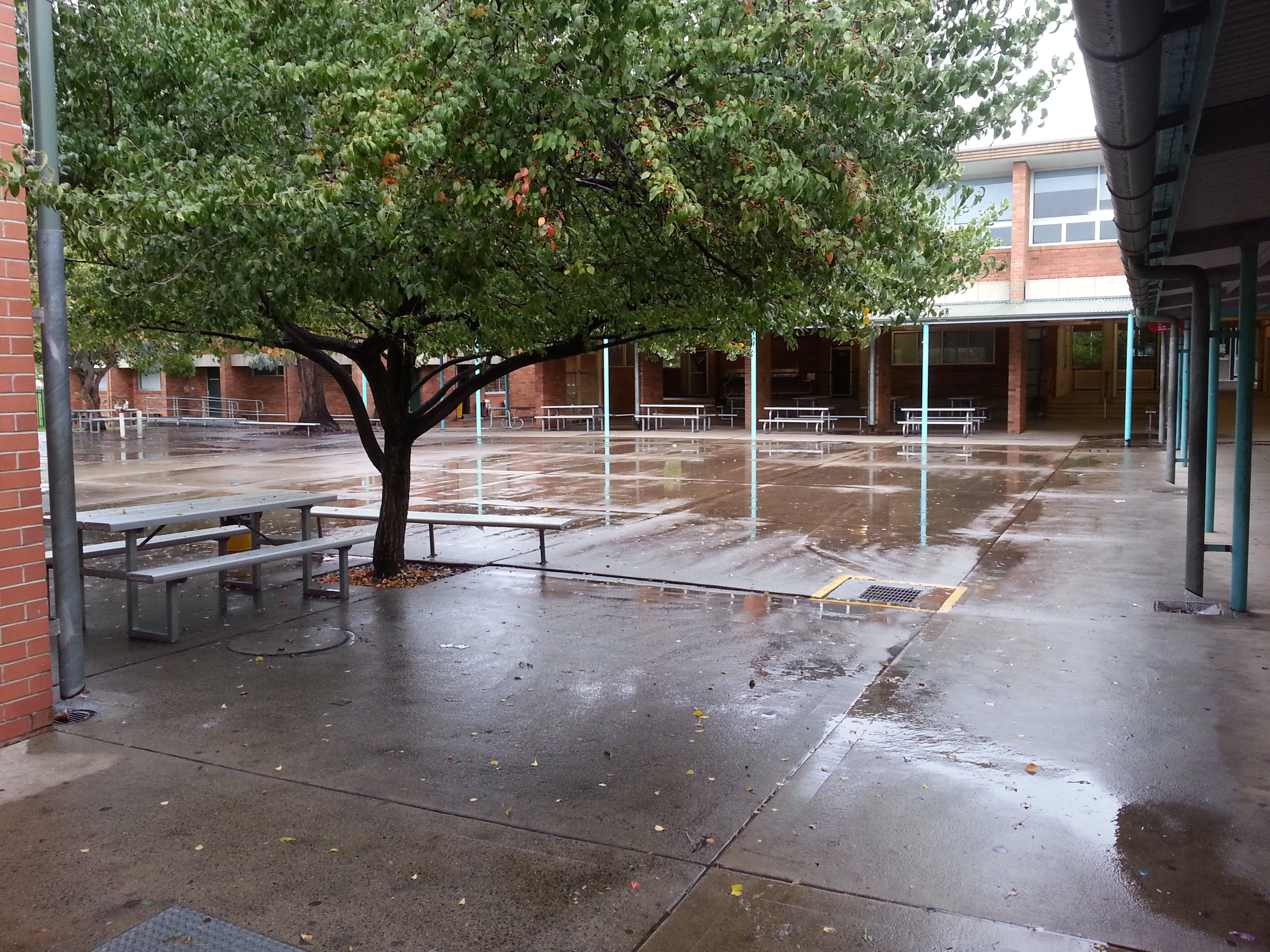
- Main Quad in 2014

Location
- 41 Douro Street, Mudgee, New South Wales
- Coordinates: 32°35′51″S 149°35′0″E

Information
- Founded: 1916
- Status: Open
- Educational authority: NSW Department of Education
- Teaching staff: 67.5 FTE (2018)
- Years: 7–12
- Enrolment: 813 (2018)
- Houses: Blaxland; Cunningham; Lawson; Wentworth
- Colours: Blue and red
- Website: mudgee-h.schools.nsw.gov.au

Mudgee High School is a government-funded co-educational comprehensive secondary day school located in Mudgee in the Central West region of New South Wales, Australia.

Mudgee High was established in 1916 and is operated by the New South Wales Department of Education. In 2018, it had 810 enrolled students; 13 percent of whom identified as Indigenous Australians and five percent were from a language background other than English.

== Notable alumni ==
- Ivan Dougherty, Australian general
