= Felicity Brown (milliner) =

Australian milliner

- Born: Mudgee
- Occupation: milliner
- Known for: hats, fascinators

Felicity (Flic) Brown is an Australian milliner. She was born in Mudgee, and now lives in Broome, Western Australia.

She has shown her hats at New York Fashion Week.

Brown is the subject of a documentary, Madhattan - Aussie Outback to New York Runway shown on Lifestyle, that has won a number of awards, including the Special Jury Award for Bridging Cultures at the Arizona International Film Festival, and the World Cinema Documentary Feature award at the Amsterdam Film Festival.

Her story has also been part of a Landline program.
