= St Mary's Roman Catholic Church, Mudgee =

St Mary's Roman Catholic Church
- St Mary of the Presentation Church, Mudgee
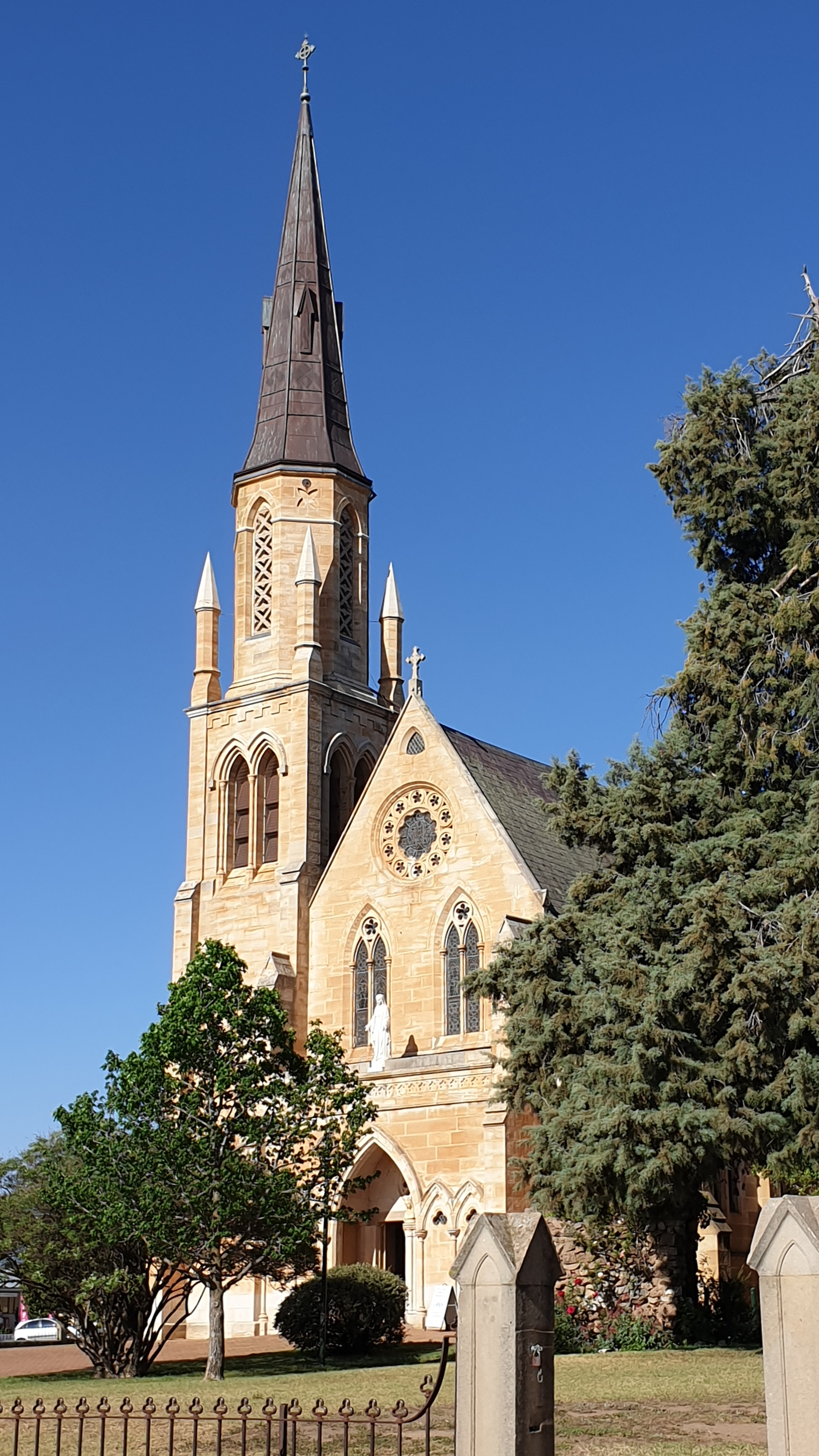
- St Mary's Church, Mudgee in 2008

- Location in New South Wales
- 32°35′29″S 149°35′21″E
- Location: 13 Church Street, Mudgee, Mid-Western Regional Council, New South Wales
- Country: Australia
- Denomination: Catholic
- Website: mudgee.catholic.org.au

History
- Status: Church
- Founded: 1857
- Founder: Fr Callaghan McCarthy
- Dedication: Saint Mary of the Presentation

Architecture
- Functional status: Active
- Architect: Edward Gell
- Architectural type: Church
- Style: Victorian Ecclesiastical Gothic
- Years built: 1857–1876

Specifications
- Materials: Sandstone

Administration
- Province: Sydney
- Diocese: Bathurst
- Parish: Mudgee

Clergy
- Priest: Very Rev Paul Devitt VG VF

New South Wales Heritage Register
- Official name: St. Mary's Roman Catholic Church, Presbytery, Convent & Hall
- Type: State heritage (complex / group)
- Designated: 2 April 1999
- Reference no.: 685
- Type: Church
- Category: Religion

St Mary's Roman Catholic Church, officially, St Mary of the Presentation Church, is a heritage-listed Roman Catholic church at 13 Church Street, Mudgee, Mid-Western Regional Council, New South Wales, Australia. It was added to the New South Wales State Heritage Register on 2 April 1999.

== History ==
The church was first built in 1857, when local priest Father Callaghan McCarthy had built a church, sanctuary and sacristy. It was effectively rebuilt by between 1873 and 1876 to the design of Edward Gell, with Tambaroora contractor Mr. Webb and Bathurst stonemason Mr. Burns carrying out the work. The new design incorporated the pre-existing sanctuary and sacristy in the redevelopment while constructing the body of the current church. The foundation stone of the rebuilt church was laid on 7 December 1873 and it formally opened on 11 November 1876. The spire was added to the tower in 1911.

== Description ==
St Mary's Roman Catholic Church is a sandstone church in Victorian Ecclesiastical Gothic designed by Bathurst country architect, Edward Gell. It has a western facade with a pointed arched doorway, side recesses, and narrowly pointed stained glass windows, as well as a rose window in stone and stained glass. The church has a tower with flared copper spire balanced in a symmetrical composition with gable end of southern aisle. The side elevation features repeating pointed arched stained glass windows.

The church organ was built in 1866 by J. W. Walker of London for St Jude's Anglican Church, Randwick. Under direction of Charles Richardson, in 1907 the organ was transferred from Randwick to Mudgee with a new set of pipes to the old specification. Richardson also decorated the display pipes in his style, and other alterations included the fitting of a new keyboard, the addition of a tremulant, and the removal of the hand-blowing apparatus.

== Heritage listing ==
St Mary's Roman Catholic Church is a fine sandstone church from the post-gold rush era, making a significant contribution to the character of the central area of Mudgee.

St Mary's Roman Catholic Church was listed on the New South Wales State Heritage Register on 2 April 1999.

== Gallery ==
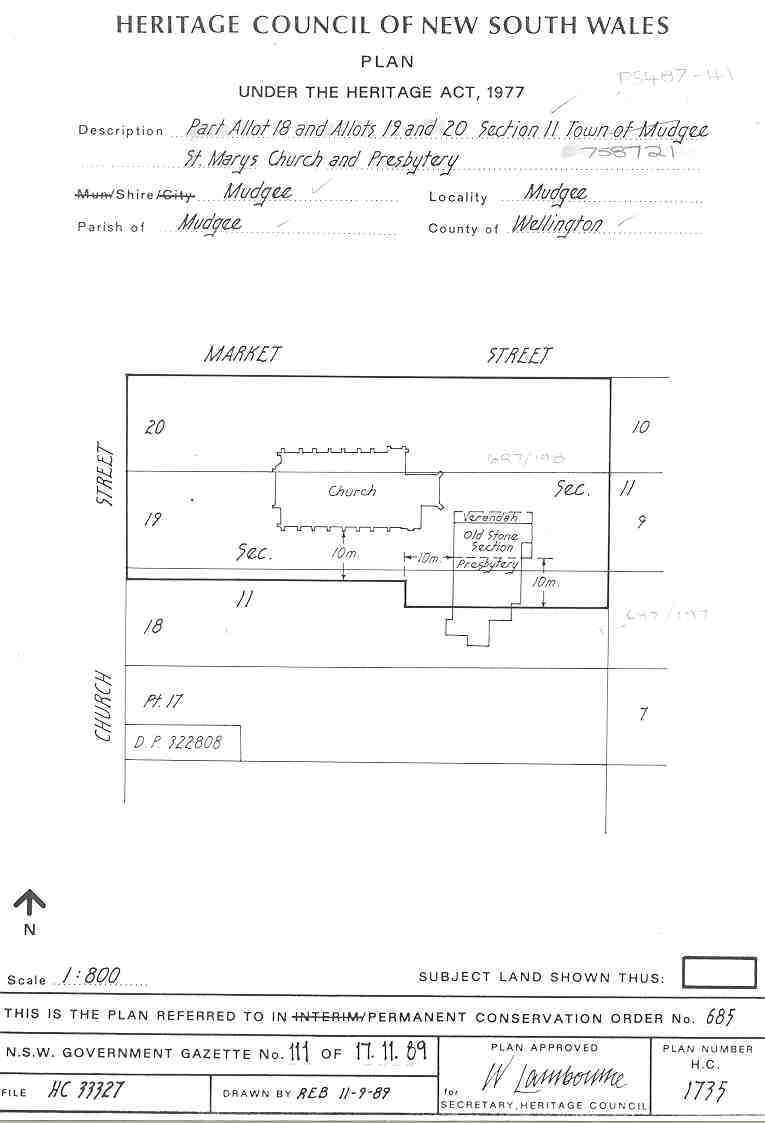
St Mary's Roman Catholic Church, Presbytery, Convent & Hall - PCO Plan Number 685

== See also ==
- List of Roman Catholic churches in New South Wales
