= Mudgee Guardian and Gulgong Advertiser =

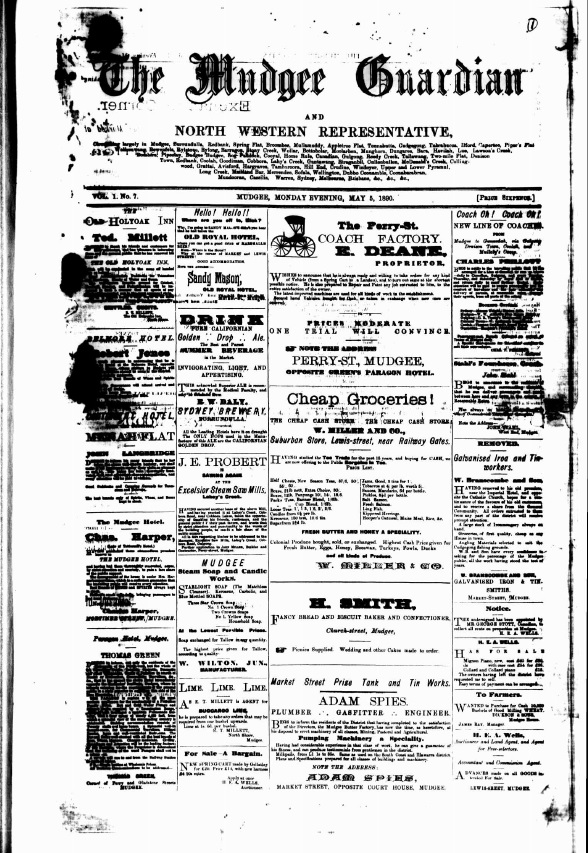
Mudgee Guardian, 5 May 1890

The Mudgee Guardian and Gulgong Advertiser is an English language newspaper published in Mudgee, New South Wales, Australia. It was established in 1890 under the name Mudgee Guardian and North-Western Representative.

== History ==
The Mudgee Guardian and Gulgong Advertiser is a semi weekly publication. The publication began as Mudgee Guardian and North-Western Representative in 1890 and was published by Charles Knight. It changed title to Mudgee Guardian and North-Western Advertiser, and then to Mudgee Guardian and Gulgong Advertiser in July 1963. The original paper consisted primarily of advertising and community news.

== Digitisation ==
The various versions of the paper have been digitised as part of the Australian Newspapers Digitisation Program project hosted by the National Library of Australia.

== See also ==
- List of newspapers in New South Wales

== Bibliography ==
- Holden, W. Sprague, Australia Goes to Press, Melbourne University Press,1961.
- Mayer, Henry, The Press in Australia, Melbourne: Lansdowne Press, 1964.
- Walker, R. B., The Newspaper Press in New South Wales, 1803-1920, Sydney University Press, 1976.
