= Ivan Dougherty =

Australian general

Sir Ivan Noel Dougherty
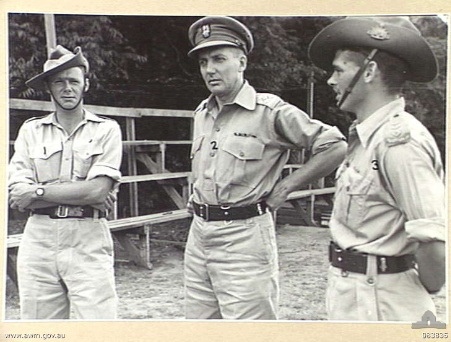
- Brigadier Ivan Dougherty, Commander 21st Brigade (centre), with Major L. E. Walcott and Captain H. M. Hamilton (right) in December 1944
- Born: 6 April 1907; Leadville, New South Wales
- Died: 4 March 1998 (aged 90); Sydney, New South Wales
- Military career
- Allegiance: Australia
- Branch: Australian Army
- Service years: 1927–1957
- Rank: Major General
- Nickname: Doc
- Service number: NX148
- Commands: 2nd Division (1952–54); 8th Brigade (1948–52); 21st Brigade (1942–45); 23rd Brigade (1942); 2/4th Battalion (1940–42); 33rd Battalion (1938–39)
- Conflicts: Second World War; Western Desert Campaign; Battle of Greece; Battle of Crete; Battle of Buna-Gona; Finisterre Range campaign; Battle of Morotai; Borneo Campaign
- Awards: Knight Bachelor; Commander of the Order of the British Empire; Distinguished Service Order & Bar; Efficiency Decoration; Mentioned in Despatches (3)
- Other work: Director of the New South Wales State Emergency Service; Deputy Chancellor of the University of Sydney

Major General Sir Ivan Noel Dougherty, CBE, DSO & Bar, ED (6 April 1907 – 4 March 1998) was an Australian Army officer during the Second World War and early Cold War period.

== Education and early life ==
Ivan Noel Dougherty was born on 6 April 1907 in Leadville, New South Wales, a small town between Dunedoo and Coolah, New South Wales, the son of Isabella Dougherty and a father he never knew. He was educated at Mudgee High School and Sydney Teachers College. In 1928 he became a teacher at Marrickville Junior Technical School (now Marrickville Public School). While teaching by day he completed a four-year Bachelor of Economics degree at the University of Sydney. He transferred to Tingha Public School in 1931 and then to Armidale West Public School.

In 1926, while still at Sydney Teachers' College, Dougherty joined the Sydney University Regiment, in which he was commissioned as a lieutenant on 27 July 1927. He was promoted to captain on 11 September 1931 but was moved to the unattached list in 1932 following his posting to Tingha. His posting to Armidale allowed him to resume his part-time military career, and he joined the 33rd/41st Infantry Battalion on 20 December 1934, and then the 33rd Infantry Battalion when it resumed its separate existence on 1 October 1936. He was promoted to major on 14 February 1938, assumed command of the 33rd Infantry Battalion on 1 December 1938, and was promoted lieutenant colonel on 28 August 1939.

Dougherty returned to Leadville at least once a year to visit his mother. On a visit in 1935, he met Phyllis Lofts, a fellow school teacher who taught at Coonamble High School. They were married at St Stephen's Presbyterian Church in Sydney. This cut short Phyllis's teaching career for the time being, as married women were not permitted to work as teachers at that time. During the Second World War this regulation would be relaxed and she was able to take a position at Goulburn High School. They would eventually have five children: Margaret and Graeme, born before the war, and, later, Maureen, David and Noela.

== Second World War ==
On the outbreak of the Second World War, Dougherty offered his services to Lieutenant Colonel George Wootten, commander-designate of the 2/2nd Infantry Battalion, as his second-on-command even though this involved a reduction in rank to major. This was accepted and Dougherty joined the Second Australian Imperial Force on 13 October 1939, receiving the AIF serial number of NX148. He was however allowed to retain his substantive rank of lieutenant colonel as an honorary rank, and therefore wear his lieutenant colonel's rank badges. Dougherty embarked from Sydney on 10 January 1940 on the SS Otranto. The ship sailed through the Suez Canal and the battalion moved by rail to an encampment at Julis, a town in the British Mandate of Palestine about 26 km north east of Gaza.

On 19 August 1940 Dougherty was appointed to command the 2/4th Infantry Battalion, with the substantive AIF rank of lieutenant colonel. This was still a New South Wales battalion of the 6th Division but part of the newly formed 19th Infantry Brigade. Dougherty received a cool reception from his new commander, Brigadier Horace Robertson, who was disappointed at being unable to select his own battalion commanders. However Dougherty soon made a good impression and when Robertson went on leave in October 1940 he recommended that Dougherty act as brigade commander, despite the fact that he was the youngest and most junior of Robertson's battalion commanders. Dougherty also encountered some resentment from regular officers like Lieutenant Colonel Henry Wells. Although he had been commissioned seven years before Dougherty, Wells was now his junior owing to the slower rate of promotion in the regular Army.

=== Libya ===
The 19th Infantry Brigade moved to Borg El Arab in November 1940 to participate in General Sir Archibald Wavell's Operation Compass. The 2/4th Infantry Battalion moved into positions around Tobruk, from which it participated in the assault on the Tobruk fortress. In the featureless desert, Dougherty was confronted with some difficulty in locating the start line for the advance, and made a series of adjustments to the battalion position. Later he felt compelled to explain his actions to his troops, explaining that he did not wish them to take any casualties due to carelessness on his part. Commanding from a Bren Gun Carrier, which he used to tool about the battlefield, Dougherty made good progress, capturing the Italian commander, Generale di Corpo d'Armata Petassi Manella. Once on his objective, Robertson had ordered Dougherty to capture Fort Airente, if feasible, thereby cutting the road to Derna, but left the final decision to Dougherty. Dougherty elected not to as he could not call for artillery since his radio was out of action, and he had to guard 1,600 Italian prisoners. Fort Airente was captured when the advance resumed in the morning, and Tobruk surrendered to Robertson.

At Derna, Robertson employed his brigade boldly in support of Lieutenant General Richard O'Connor's attempt to cut off the retreating Italian Army. Dougherty was ordered to seize Wadi Derna, a ravine 500 metres wide. His lead company reached the wadi and a platoon crossed it, establishing itself on the far side after a fight in which an Australian was killed and nine Italians captured. This small force was counter-attacked by the Italians but the Australians held their ground. Later a group of Italians blundered into the Australian position; 40 were killed and 56 captured. Dougherty now moved to join the attack on Derna, unaware that O'Connor had called it off. His troops soon ran into a large Italian force which was beaten off only with the help of fire from the Vickers machine guns of the Royal Northumberland Fusiliers and 25 pounders of the 2/1st Field Regiment. Dougherty had trucks drive to and fro to give the impression that the position was being reinforced. Fighting went on for another day before the Italians withdrew, having avoided encirclement. However O'Connor was later able to cut off the Italian Army at Beda Fomm. For his services in this campaign, Dougherty was mentioned in dispatches and awarded the Distinguished Service Order.

=== Greece, Crete and Syria ===
The 2/4th Infantry Battalion landed at Piraeus on 3 April 1940 and moved into the line in the Kleidi area where the 19th Infantry Brigade (now under Brigadier George Alan Vasey) attempted to make a stand against the advancing German Army. Dougherty was given some six km of front to defend – a nearly impossible task. At the Battle of Vevi, the battalion was forced to withdraw after the units on both its flanks were forced back. The 19th Infantry Brigade next attempted to hold Thermopylae. A successful rearguard action covered the general withdrawal from Greece. The 19th Infantry Brigade made its way to Megara where the 2/4th Infantry Battalion was evacuated by HMS Hasty.

The 2/4th Infantry Battalion arrived on Crete where it was detached from the 19th Infantry Brigade and sent to help British and Greek units defend Heraklion. Dougherty managed to hold his positions against the German airborne assault, destroying a considerable part of the German force and capturing a considerable quantity of weapons and supplies. The Germans gradually tightened their grip on the area, however, and it was decided to evacuate the troops at Heraklion from Crete. Dougherty waited until all his men were embarked on British warships before himself departing on HMS Kimberley. HMS Orion and HMS Dido were attacked by large numbers of Stukas and 48 of Dougherty's men were killed. For his services in Greece and Crete, Dougherty was mentioned in despatches a second time.

Dougherty arrived back in Palestine after the campaign in Greece to find no mail awaiting him. His mail had been stopped on the order of Major General Iven Mackay who wanted to personally break the sad news to Dougherty that his daughter Margaret had been killed in a playground accident in Mosman, New South Wales. After its battering in Greece, the 2/4th Infantry Battalion rested and re-trained in Palestine before moving to Syria in October 1941. In January 1942 it embarked for Australia.

=== New Guinea ===
On arrival in Adelaide Dougherty was informed that he was being promoted to brigadier and given command of the 23rd Infantry Brigade, a part of Major General Edmund Herring's Northern Territory Force. Dougherty was unimpressed with the standard of morale and training of his new command and within weeks he relieved all three of his battalion commanders.

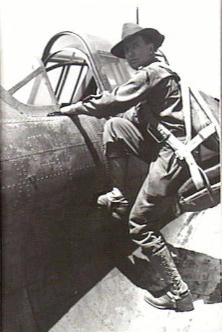
Dougherty boards an aircraft to undertake a tactical reconnaissance.

In October 1942, Herring summoned Dougherty to Port Moresby to take over command of the 21st Infantry Brigade from Brigadier Arnold Potts. After making an appreciation of the Gona area, Dougherty decided to bring overwhelming force against small Japanese forces, defeating the enemy in detail. Several days of bitter and costly fighting followed as the 21st Infantry Brigade fought for Gona and the nearby Japanese positions. In the process, the 21st Infantry Brigade was almost annihilated by casualties and disease. Dougherty suffered an attack of malaria and arranged to be admitted to hospital in Goulburn, New South Wales in order to be near his family. For this campaign, Dougherty was awarded a bar to his Distinguished Service Order.

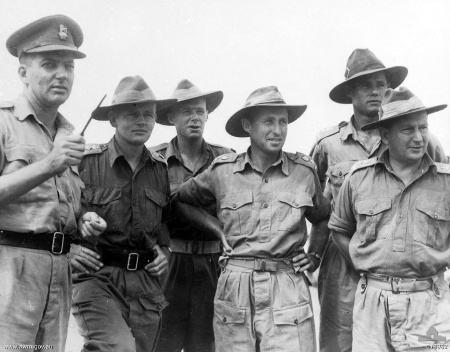
Officers of the 21st Infantry Brigade. Left to right: Brigadier I. N. Dougherty NX148, Commanding Officer (CO) 21st Infantry Brigade; Lieutenant Colonel F. H. Sublet WX1598 CO, 2/16th Infantry Battalion; Major L. E. Walcott NX34843, Brigade Major; Lieutenant-Colonel P. E. Rhoden 3129001, CO 2/14th Infantry Battalion; Lieutenant Colonel A. C. Sharp CO, 2/6th Field Ambulance; and Lieutenant Colonel K. S. Picken VX48 CO, 2/27th Infantry Battalion.

The 21st Infantry Brigade gradually reassembled at Ravenshoe, Queensland as its personnel returned from leave and hospital. Dougherty rebuilt his brigade, once again ruthlessly weeding out officers who did not meet his standards, including two of his battalion commanders.

In July 1943 the 21st Infantry Brigade began moving north once more. Following the capture of Kaiapit, the brigade was flown in. Dougherty then carried out a rapid advance into the Ramu Valley culminating in the capture of Dumpu. Dougherty then moved into the Finisterre Range, establishing a toehold on Shaggy Ridge. By utilising speed and surprise to keep the enemy off balance, Dougherty had managed to accomplish the 7th Division's mission.

A broken ankle caused Dougherty to be hospitalised at the 2/5th General Hospital in Port Moresby. He rejoined his brigade in early 1944, but only in time for its relief and return to Australia. For this campaign, Dougherty earned a third mention in despatches.

=== Borneo ===
Once again the 21st Infantry Brigade assembled at Ravenshoe after taking leave. As amphibious warfare was contemplated for the brigade's next operation, Dougherty observed the invasion of Morotai, sailing on HMAS Kanimbla. Lessons were incorporated into the 7th Division's exercises on the beaches near Cairns, Queensland over the following months. When the 7th Division sailed north again, it was to Morotai.

Dougherty's final battle of the war was at Balikpapan, where the 21st Infantry Brigade landed on 1 July 1945. The Japanese were totally outnumbered and outgunned, but like the other battles of the Pacific War, many of them fought to the death. Despite this, the 7th Division's casualties were significantly lighter than they had suffered in previous campaigns, mainly due to the employment of staggering amounts of firepower. General Douglas MacArthur paid Dougherty a visit on the beachhead while it was still under fire.

Following the surrender of Japan the 21st Brigade was detached to Makassar where Dougherty became Military Governor, a role he had already carried out in Benghazi with the 2/4th Infantry Battalion. Dougherty accepted surrender of the outlying Japanese forces, handled the processing of Japanese POWs and the release of Allied POWs and internees, organised the distribution of food and medical supplies to the civilian population and maintained civil order. In recognition of "gallant and distinguished services in the South West Pacific", Dougherty was made a Commander of the Order of the British Empire in 1947.

== Later life ==
Returning to civilian life, Dougherty contested the seat of East Sydney as a Liberal candidate in the 1946 election. The seat was a blue ribbon Labor seat held by Eddie Ward, and Dougherty lost.

Dougherty returned to teaching, accepting a post as headmaster of Enmore Activity School in 1946. In 1948, he became Inspector of Schools in the Bega District. He left the New South Wales Education Department in 1955 to become the first Director of the New South Wales Defence Organisation and State Emergency Services, a position he held until retirement in 1972. He was knighted on 7 June 1968 for "services to ex-servicemen and the community".

Dougherty remained in the Army as a reservist. He assumed command of the 8th Infantry Brigade in 1948. He was promoted to major general in 1952 on taking command of the 2nd Division. In 1954, he became the CMF member of the Military Board, which he held until his retirement from the Army in 1957. Dougherty again clashed with Sir Henry Wells, now Chief of the General Staff. Dougherty felt that he should be Chairman of the Military Board when Wells was absent, being the next most senior member. Wells denounced "the impertinence of a part-time soldier wanting to be the chairman of a board of regular soldiers!" Dougherty replied, "No we are all the same, we are all soldiers." In 1960, the Minister for the Army, John Cramer, attempted to appoint Dougherty as Chief of the General Staff in succession to Lieutenant General Sir Ragnar Garrett. The proposal got as far as cabinet, where it was defeated.

Dougherty was a fellow of the Senate of the University of Sydney from 1954 to 1974, and served as Deputy Chancellor from 1958 to 1966. The university awarded him an honorary degree of Doctor of Laws in 1976. The Ivan Dougherty Gallery at the College of Fine Arts, at the University of New South Wales was also named in his honour. As a result, his name is today widely associated with fine art.

After a long illness, Dougherty died on 4 March 1998, survived by Lady Phyllis and his four remaining children. More than 500 people, including an estimated 200 men who had served under him in the Second World War, gathered at St. Andrew's Cathedral, Sydney to pay tribute to him. He was cremated at Sutherland Cemetery.
