= Menah =

Menah New South Wales
- Coordinates: 32°32′01″S 149°31′59″E
- Population: 152 (2016 census)
- Postcode(s): 2850
- Location: 274 km (170 mi) NW of Sydney; 176 km (109 mi) NE of Orange; 8.7 km (5 mi) NW of Mudgee
- LGA(s): Mid-Western Regional Council
- State electorate(s): Electoral district of Dubbo
- Federal division(s): Calare

Menah is a locality in New South Wales, Australia. It is located about 9 kilometres (5.6 mi) north-west of Mudgee. In the 2016 census, it recorded a population of 152 people.
