= Widden, New South Wales =

- Suburb
- Coordinates: 32°24′13″S 150°23′41″E
- Country: Australia
- State: New South Wales

Population
  - Total: 87 (SAL 2021)
- Postcode: 2328
Suburbs around Widden, New South Wales
	Merriwa	Sandy Hollow
Bylong		Baerami Creek, New South Wales

Widden is a locality in New South Wales, Australia, in the Muswellbrook Shire. It is located on the Bylong Valley Way. The Sandy Hollow–Gulgong goods railway line passes through the locality.

Preceding station	Former services	Following station
Kerrabee towards Gulgong	Sandy Hollow–Gulgong Line	Baerami towards Sandy Hollow

== See also ==
- Bylong
- Sandy Hollow
- Denman
