= Bathurst-Ilford Road =

Road in New South Wales, Australia

Bathurst-Ilford Road New South Wales
- Coordinates: 33.418694°S 149.604163°E (South end); 32.962270°S 149.857869°E (North end)

General information
- Type: Rural road
- Length: 72.0 km (45 mi)
- Gazetted: August 1928

Major junctions
- South end: Great Western Highway; Kelso, New South Wales
- North end: Castlereagh Highway; Ilford, New South Wales

Location(s)
- Major settlements: Sofala

Bathurst-Ilford Road (known as Sofala Road south of the Turon River and Ilford-Sofala Road north of the Turon River) is a 72.0-kilometre (44.7 mi) New South Wales country road linking Ilford to the regional hub of Bathurst.

== Route ==
Bathurst-Ilford Road commences at the intersection with Castlereagh Highway in Ilford and heads in a south-westerly direction, eventually crossing the Turon River and passing the historic town of Sofala. It then continues in a southerly direction and passes through Wattle Flat and Peel, before eventually ending at the intersection with Great Western Highway in Kelso, just east of Bathurst, which itself acts as a major highway hub with the Great Western, Mid-Western Highway and Mitchell Highways – and O'Connell Road to Oberon – meet.

It is fully sealed over its entire length, but many road maps still show sections of it as unsealed.

In conjunction with Bylong Valley Way from Castlereagh Highway near Ilford to Golden Highway near Sandy Hollow, this very quiet and scenic route provides a leisurely alternative to going through Sydney to travel between the Hunter Region and Bathurst.

== History ==
The passing of the Main Roads Act of 1924 through the Parliament of New South Wales provided for the declaration of Main Roads, roads partially funded by the State government through the Main Roads Board (MRB). Main Road No. 54 was declared along this road on 8 August 1928, from the intersection with Mudgee-Ilford Road (today Castlereagh Highway) in Ilford, via Sofala to Bathurst (and continuing southwards eventually to Goulburn); with the passing of the Main Roads (Amendment) Act of 1929 to provide for additional declarations of State Highways and Trunk Roads, this was amended to Trunk Road 54 on 8 April 1929.

The passing of the Roads Act of 1993 through the Parliament of New South Wales updated road classifications and the way they could be declared within New South Wales. Under this act, the road today retains its declaration as part of Main Road 54, between Ilford and Kelso.

== Major intersections ==
LGA	Location	km	mi	Destinations	Notes
Bathurst	Kelso	0	0.0	Great Western Highway (A32) – Bathurst, Marrangaroo	Southern end of road, which runs north-west as Gilmour Street and then north as Sofala Road
Bathurst	Wattle Flat	35.9	22.3	Limekilns Road – Bathurst	Alternate route to Bathurst via Limekilns
Bathurst	Sofala	43.3	26.9	Hill End Road (west) – Hill End; Denison Street (east) – Sofala	Road continues north as Ilford Sofala Road.
Turon River		43.4	27.0	Crossley Bridge	
Mid Western Region	Ilford	72.0	44.7	Castlereagh Highway (B55) – Mudgee, Marrangaroo	Northern end of road
1.000 mi = 1.609 km; 1.000 km = 0.621 mi: Route transition

== See also ==
- List of highways in New South Wales
