= Baerami Creek, New South Wales =

Baerami Creek
- Town
- Interactive map of Baerami Creek
- Coordinates: 32°31′17″S 150°27′11″E
- Country: Australia
- State: New South Wales
- Region: Upper Hunter
- LGA: Muswellbrook Shire
- Location: 307 km (191 mi) NNW of Sydney; 177 km (110 mi) WNW of Newcastle; 41.5 km (25.8 mi) WNW of Denman

Government
  - State electorate: Upper Hunter
  - Federal division: New England

Population
  - Total: 27 (2021 census)
- Time zone: UTC+10 (AEST)
  - Summer (DST): UTC+11 (AEDT)
- Postcode: 2333
- County: Hunter
- Parish: Baerami
Localities around Baerami Creek
Widden	Baerami	Sandy Hollow
Widden Valley	Baerami Creek	Martindale
	Wollemi National Park

Baerami Creek is a locality in the Muswellbrook Shire in the Upper Hunter region of New South Wales, Australia. Part of the locality lies in a part of the valley of the watercourse of the same name, Baerami Creek.

The area now known as Baerami Creek lies on the traditional lands of Wonnarua people.

Baerami Creek has a deposit of oil shale, which was reputedly the largest in New South Wales and around twice the size of that at Glen Davis. It was accessible from the Baerami Creek valley and lay relatively close to the Merriwa railway line at Sandy Hollow. The location of the deposit was often referred to as 'Baerami', but it actually lies to the south of that adjacent locality. The deposit extends to the west, where it also outcrops in the valley of Widden Brook, at the locality now known as Widden Valley.

The presence of oil shale in the area was known from around 1901. The first attempts to exploit the oil shale date from around 1915, but did not progress. Various small tunnels were dug into the shale deposit, but it was only in 1925 that a retort was set up by Mr. Jaeger of the Muswellbrook-Baerami Shale Syndicate, and the first oil was made from Baerami Creek oil shale. That operation ended around 1927.

In the period from 1929 to 1934, two companies, Widden-Baerami Shale Oil and Coal Ltd and Bearami South Shale and Oil Co. Ltd, had leases in the area and carried out testing of shale, with some developmental mining. There was proposed township and subdivision to house those associated with the shale developments, which never eventuated. Both company's leases were controlled by Bearami South Shale and Oil Co. Ltd, from 1934, and those leases were sold to Standard Oil Company of Australia, in 1937.

Starting around 1937, the Standard Oil Company of Australia—despite its name not connected to Standard Oil—had plans, by 1939–1940, to exploit the oil shale deposits—planning to produce 28 million gallons of petrol per year for 15 years—but that was contingent upon removal of a government excise on locally produced oil. Those plans did not proceed beyond successful experimental production using a 'Renco' retort, at Hamilton in Newcastle, over three months in 1939. The retort was relocated by the government to Glen Davis, in 1942, where it sat unused.

In 1940, a Miller retort erected by Colonial Petroleum Oil Limited was operated at Baerami Creek. This operation continued, until around 1942. By 1943, another organisation, Shale Oil Products Co-Op Limited—backed by a number of companies with vehicle fleets—was exploiting the shale deposit and producing crude oil and 2,000 imperial gallons of petrol per week, moving the shale by road to its retorts at nearby Sandy Hollow. This operation only used the richest of the oil shale from the Baerami seams, discarding the rest. The fuel produced was used by the backers, to overcome a wartime shortage of motor fuel, for their own road vehicles. This company was in liquidation by June 1945, when its equipment was put up for sale. Production ceased in August 1945.

In 1945, a report concluded that a government-backed shale oil industry, at Baerami, should not proceed, although it left open the possibility of an operation by a private operator if the excise on locally produced oil could be removed. Although Standard Oil of Australia was still expressing interest in developing an industry there, as late as 1950, nothing significant happened; any plans for an oil industry at Baemari became collateral damage of the failure of the shale oil industry at Glen Davis. In 1952, the company gave up its efforts, after spending £90,000 over fifteen years on development works, "in the teeth of Government apathy. vacillation and passive hostility", and was voluntarily wound up. No oil shale has been mined in the area since 1945.

There are some remnants at the shale mine site adjacent to Baerami Creek, approximately 25 km south of the road junction near the crossing of Baerami Creek at Baerami. There are 22 shale mining tunnels in the area, which is now a part of Wollemi National Park.

There was once a school, post office, and community hall at Baerami Creek.

== See also ==
- Baerami
- Sandy Hollow
- Denman
