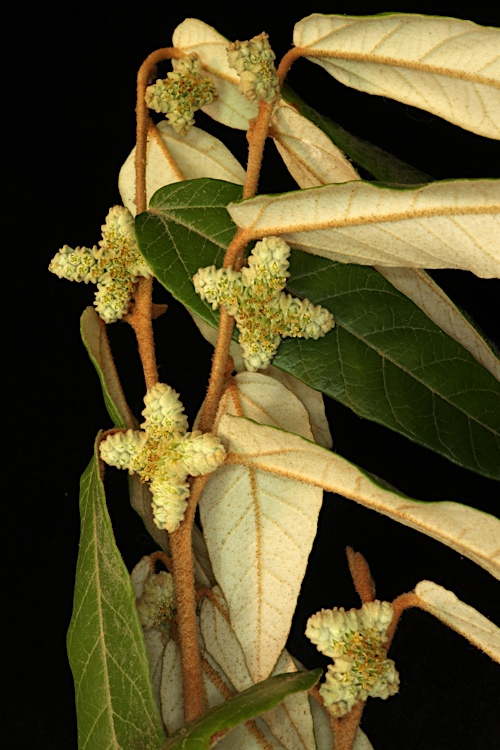

Conservation status
- Vulnerable (EPBC Act)

Scientific classification
- Kingdom: Plantae
- Clade: Tracheophytes
- Clade: Angiosperms
- Clade: Eudicots
- Clade: Rosids
- Order: Malvales
- Family: Malvaceae
- Genus: Lasiopetalum
- Species: L. longistamineum

Binomial name
- Lasiopetalum longistamineum Maiden & Betche

= Lasiopetalum longistamineum =

Mt Dangar velvet bush

Species of shrub

Lasiopetalum longistamineum commonly known as Mt Dangar velvet bush, is a species of flowering plant in the family Malvaceae and is endemic to a restricted area of New South Wales. It is a spreading shrub with branches densely covered with woolly, rust-coloured hairs, egg-shaped leaves and crowded, woolly-hairy flowers.

== Description ==
Lasiopetalum longistamineum is a spreading shrub that typically grows to a height of 1.5 m (4 ft 11 in), its branches densely covered with woolly, rust-coloured hairs. The leaves are egg-shaped with a heart-shaped base and tapering tip, 40–110 mm (1.6–4.3 in) long and 12–25 mm (0.47–0.98 in) wide on a petiole 10–15 mm (0.39–0.59 in) long. The upper surface of the leaves is more or less glabrous and the lower surface is densely covered with white hairs, rust-coloured on the veins. The flowers are borne in spike-like groups with more or less egg-shaped, densely hairy bracteoles 3–4 mm (0.12–0.16 in) long below the base of the sepals. The sepals are oblong, about 3 mm (0.12 in) long, glabrous on the front and densely hairy on the back and there are no petals. The stamen filaments are three times longer than the anthers. Flowering occurs in spring.

== Taxonomy ==
Lasiopetalum longistamineum was first formally described in 1905 by Joseph Maiden and Ernst Betche in the Proceedings of the Linnean Society of New South Wales from specimens collected by John Boorman on Mount Dangar, near Gungal in 1904. The specific epithet (longistamineum) means "long stamen".

== Distribution and habitat ==
This lasiopetalum grows in grassy woodland and dry rainforest and is restricted to the Gungal-Mount Dangar area between Merriwa and Muswellbrook in eastern New South Wales.

== Conservation status ==
Lasiopetalum longistamineum is listed as "vulnerable" under the Australian Government Environment Protection and Biodiversity Conservation Act 1999 and the New South Wales Government Biodiversity Conservation Act 2016.
