= Castlereagh Highway =

Highway in New South Wales and Queensland, Australia

Castlereagh Highway Queensland–New South Wales
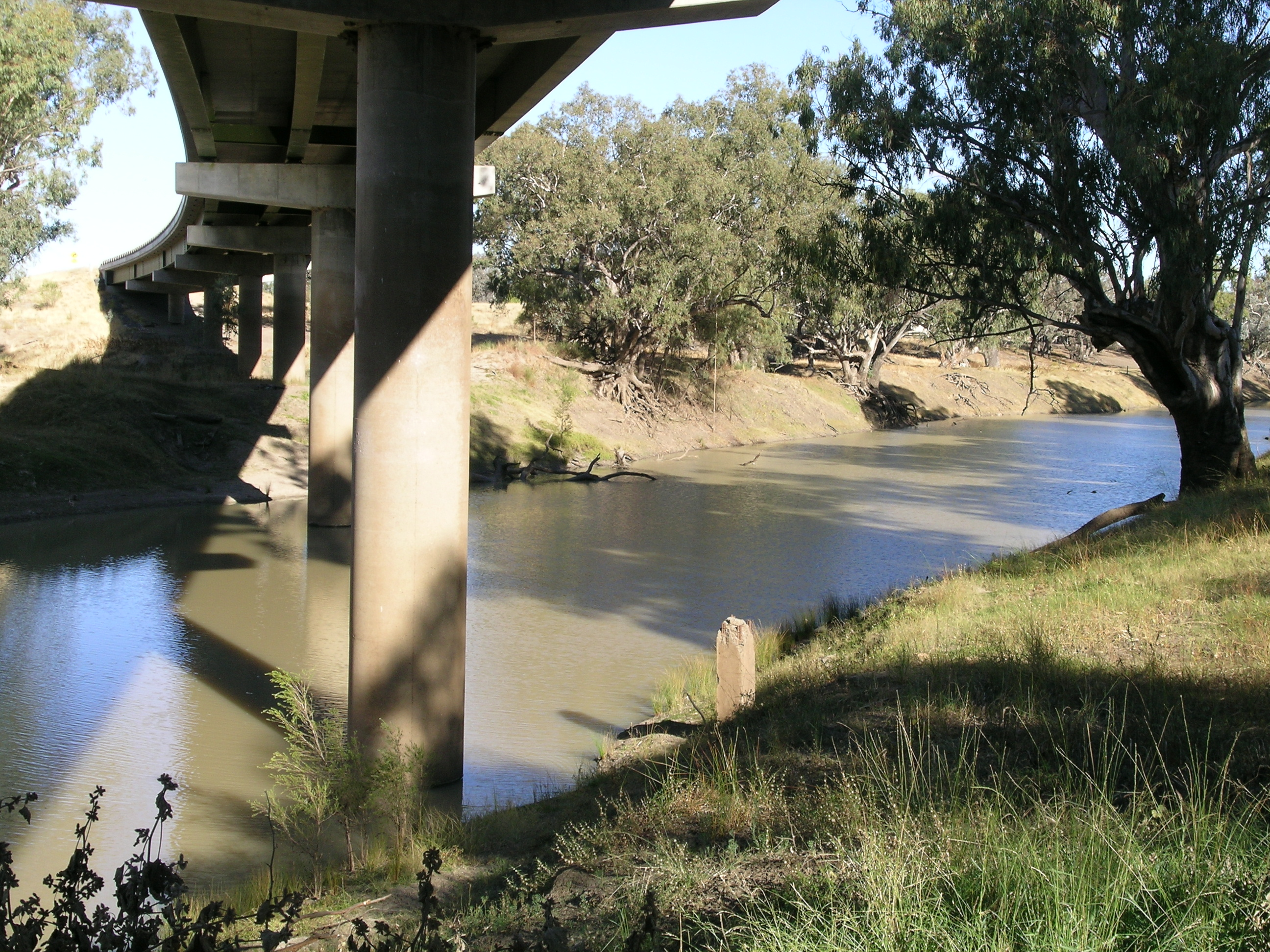
- Dick O'Brien Bridge (1991) carrying Castlereagh Highway over Barwon River, Walgett, NSW.

General information
- Type: Highway
- Length: 790 km (491 mi)
- Gazetted: August 1928 (NSW, as Main Road 56); March 1938 (NSW, as State Highway 18)
- Route number(s): A55 (2005–present) (St George–QLD/NSW border); B55 (2013–present) (QLD/NSW border–Marrangaroo)
- Former route number: National Route 55 (1997–2005) (St George–QLD/NSW border); National Route 55 (1974–2013) (QLD/NSW border–Gilgandra); State Route 86 (1974–2013) (Gilgandra–Marrangaroo)

Major junctions
- North end: Carnarvon Highway; St George, Queensland
- Gwydir Highway; Kamilaroi Highway; Newell Highway; Oxley Highway; Golden Highway
- South end: Great Western Highway; Marrangaroo, New South Wales

Location(s)
- Major settlements: Dirranbandi, Hebel, Walgett, Coonamble, Gilgandra, Dunedoo, Mudgee

Highway system
- Highways in Australia; National Highway • Freeways in Australia; Highways in Queensland; Highways in New South Wales

Castlereagh Highway is a 790-kilometre (490 mi) state highway located in New South Wales and Queensland, Australia. From north to south the highway traverses South West Queensland and the North West Slopes, Orana, and Central West regions of New South Wales.

The highway is part of the Great Inland Way linking Sydney and Cairns, and provides all-weather access to rugged black opal country of Lightning Ridge.

Castlereagh Highway was named after the Castlereagh River, which it parallels for most of its journey north from Gilgandra.

== Route ==
Castlereagh Highway commences at an intersection with Carnarvon Highway, south of St George, Queensland, and heads in a south-westerly direction via Dirranbandi to Hebel, where it crosses the state border with New South Wales just beyond and continues in a southerly direction, past Lightning Ridge to Walgett, where it crosses the Barwon and Namoi Rivers and meets the Gwydir and Kamilaroi Highways. Continuing south through Coonamble, the highway crosses the Castlereagh River and meets the Oxley and Newell Highways in Gilgandra. It continues in a south-easterly direction through Dunedoo, sharing a short concurrency with Golden Highway, continues through the regional centres of Gulgong and Mudgee, through Ilford and the junctions of Bathurst-Ilford Road and Bylong Valley Way, before eventually terminating at an interchange with Great Western Highway at Marrangaroo, 10 kilometres (6.2 mi) north-west of Lithgow.

== History ==
The passing of the Main Roads Act of 1924 through the Parliament of New South Wales provided for the declaration of Main Roads, roads partially funded by the State government through the Main Roads Board (MRB, later Transport for NSW). Main Road No. 55 was declared from the intersection with Great Western Highway near Marrangaroo, via Ilford, Mudgee, and Gulgong to Craboon (and continuing northwards via Coolah eventually to the intersection with Oxley Highway at Mullaley), Main Road No. 56 was declared from Walgett, via Coonamble to Gilgandra (and continuing southwards via Dubbo, Forbes, Cowra, Yass and Canberra eventually to the intersection with Queanbeyan-Braidwood Road, today Kings Highway, at Queanbeyan), and Main Road No. 205 was declared from Craboon via Dunedoo to Mendooran (and continuing northwards via Tooraweenah to Coonamble), on the same day, 8 August 1928. With the passing of the Main Roads (Amendment) Act of 1929 to provide for additional declarations of State Highways and Trunk Roads, these were amended to Trunk Roads 55 and 56 and Main Road 205 on 8 April 1929. Trunk Road 77 was later declared from the intersection with Oxley Highway at Gilgandra via Mendooran and Dunedoo, to Trunk Road 55 at Craboon, on 16 March 1938.

The Department of Main Roads, which had succeeded the MRB in 1932, declared State Highway 18 on 16 March 1938, from the intersection with State Highway 11 (later known as Oxley Highway) at Gilgandra via Coonamble and Walgett to the state border with Queensland near Brenda; with the declaration of State Highway 17 (later known as Newell Highway) on the same day, the northern end of Trunk Road 56 was truncated to meet State Highway 17 at Forbes, as a result. State Highway 18 was named Castlereagh Highway on 12 May 1954, after the Castlereagh River, with the river named in honour of Lord Castlereagh.

The alignment north of Lightning Ridge was altered on 17 June 1959 to meet the state border with Queensland at Hebel via Angledool, instead of via Brenda. In December 1982, a 15 kilometre deviation opened south of Mudgee as part of the Windamere Dam project.

The Roads & Traffic Authority, succeeding the New South Wales DMR in 1989, extended the highway declaration south from Gilgandra via Dunedoo and Mudgee to Marrangaroo on 3 October 1997, subsuming Main Road 77 (previously Trunk Road 77). The southern end of Main Road 56 (previously Trunk Road 56) was truncated to meet State Highway 18 east of Craboon, as a result.

The passing of the Roads Act of 1993 through the Parliament of New South Wales updated road classifications and the way they could be declared within New South Wales. Under this act, Castlereagh Highway today retains its declaration as Highway 18, from the state border with Queensland at Hebel to the intersection with Oxley Highway in Gilgrandra, then from the intersection with Newell Highway in Gilgandra to the intersection with Golden Highway in Dunedoo, then from the intersection with Golden Highway near Craboon to the interchange with Great Western Highway at Marrangaroo.

Within New South Wales, the highway was signed National Route 55 in 1974 from Gilgandra to Walgett, and State Route 86 south of Gilgandra; National Route 55 was extended north from Walgett to the border with Queensland in 1983. Queensland however signed Carnarvon Highway as National Route 55 between 1983 and 1997 rather than Castlereagh Highway, causing a major discrepancy for many years in that National Route 55 met the border at Hebel but abruptly begun again over 100 kilometres (62 mi) east along the border at Mungindi. The Queensland Road Department changed this in 1997 and signed National Route 55 over the border north to St George, and eventually to Charters Towers in later years. With both states' conversion to the newer alphanumeric system between 2005 and 2013, its route number was updated to route A7 between Rolleston and Roma and A55 between Roma and the state border for the highway within Queensland in 2005, and eventually along the remaining highway within New South Wales as route B55 in 2013.

== Upgrades ==
The Roads of Strategic Importance initiative, last updated in March 2022, includes the following project for Castlereagh Highway.

=== Carnarvon Highway intersection upgrade ===
A project to upgrade the intersection with Carnarvon Highway at a cost of $3.4 million was completed in mid-2022. This project was targeted for "early works" by the Queensland Government.

== Major junctions ==
State	LGA	Location	km	mi	Destinations	Notes
Queensland	Balonne	St George	0	0.0	Carnarvon Highway (A55 north, National Route 46 south) – Roma, St George, Mungindi	Northern terminus of highway at T intersection, route A55 continues north along Castlereagh Highway
Queensland	Balonne	Dirranbandi	68	42	Noondoo–Mungindi Road – Mungindi	T intersection
Queensland	Balonne	Dirranbandi	88	55	Railway Street – Dirranbandi	T intersection
Queensland	Balonne	Dirranbandi	90	56	Bollon–Dirranbandi Road – Bollon	T intersection
Queensland	Balonne	Hebel	154	96	William Street – Goodooga	T intersection
Queensland	Balonne	Hebel	158	98	Castlereagh Highway	Southern terminus of route A55
State border			158	98	Queensland – New South Wales state border	
New South Wales	Walgett	Angledool	158	98	Castlereagh Highway	Northern terminus of route B55
New South Wales	Walgett	Walgett	274	170	Gwydir Highway (B76 east) – Collarenebri, Moree	T intersection; northern terminus of concurrency with route B76
New South Wales	Barwon River		281	175	Dick O'Brien Bridge	
New South Wales	Walgett	Walgett	284	176	Kamilaroi Highway (east) – Narrabri	T intersection
New South Wales	Namoi River		288	179	Bridge over the river (Marjorie Phyllis Walford Bridge)	
New South Wales	Walgett	Walgett	289	180	Kamilaroi Highway (B76 west) – Brewarrina, Bourke	4-way intersection; southern terminus of concurrency with route B76
New South Wales	Castlereagh River		404	251	Bridge over the river at Coonamble (The Sir Edward Hallstrom Bridge)	
New South Wales	Castlereagh River		462	287	Bridge over the river at Armatree (12 kilometres (7.5 mi) south of Gulargambone, no known name)	
New South Wales	Gilgandra	Gilgandra	501	311	Oxley Highway – Warren, Nevertire	T intersection
New South Wales	Gilgandra	Gilgandra	501	311	Newell Highway (A39 south) – Dubbo, Parkes	T intersection; northern terminus of concurrency with route A39
New South Wales	Castlereagh River		501	311	Bridge over the river at Gilgandra (Jack Renshaw Bridge)	
New South Wales	Gilgandra	Gilgandra	502	312	Newell Highway (A39 north) – Coonabarabran	T intersection; southern terminus of concurrency with route A39
New South Wales	Castlereagh River		541	336	Bridge over the river (12 kilometres (7.5 mi) west of Mendooran, no known name)	
New South Wales	Warrumbungle	Mendooran	553	344	Mendoran Road – Binnaway, Coonabarabran	T intersection
New South Wales	Warrumbungle	Dunedoo	591	367	Golden Highway (B84 west) – Dubbo	T intersection; western terminus of concurrency with route B84
New South Wales	Talbragar River		596	370	Bridge over the river (no known name)	
New South Wales	Warrumbungle	Dunedoo	601	373	Golden Highway (B84 east) – Merriwa, Singleton, Newcastle	T intersection; eastern terminus of concurrency with route B84
New South Wales	Wialdra Creek		638	396	Bridge over the river (no known name)	
New South Wales	Cudgegong River		657	408	Holyoake Bridge (1km North of Mudgee)	
New South Wales	Mid-Western	Ilford	725	450	Bylong Valley Way – Kandos, Rylstone, Bylong, Sandy Hollow	T intersection
New South Wales	Mid-Western	Ilford	727	452	Bathurst-Ilford Road – Sofala, Bathurst	
New South Wales	Lithgow	Marrangaroo	790	490	Great Western Highway (A32) – Bathurst, Lithgow, Sydney	Southern terminus of highway and route B55 at directional T interchange;
1.000 mi = 1.609 km; 1.000 km = 0.621 mi: Concurrency terminus; Route transition

== See also ==
- Highways in Australia
- List of highways in New South Wales
- List of highways in Queensland
