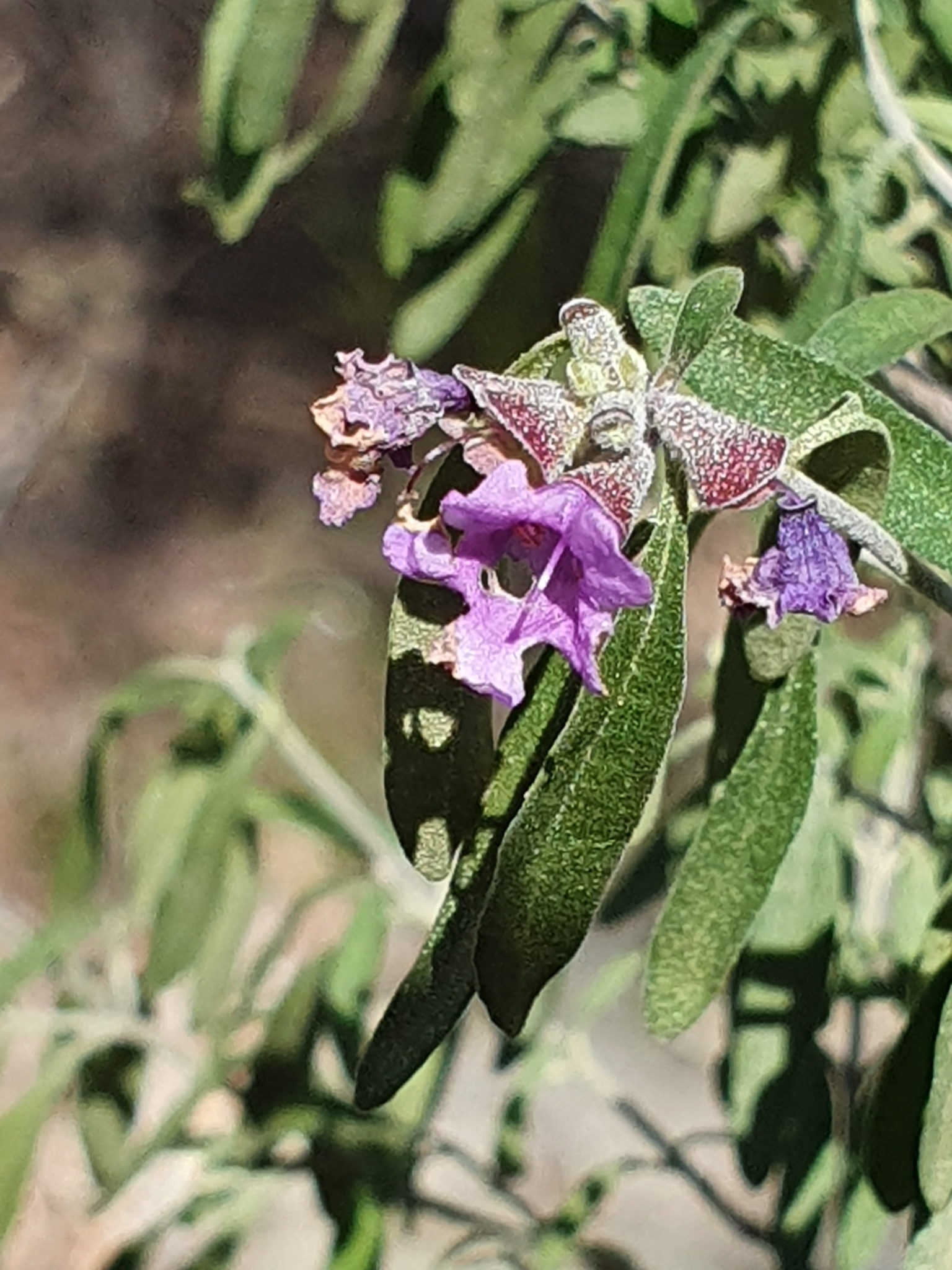

Conservation status
- Vulnerable (EPBC Act)

Scientific classification
- Kingdom: Plantae
- Clade: Tracheophytes
- Clade: Angiosperms
- Clade: Eudicots
- Clade: Asterids
- Order: Lamiales
- Family: Lamiaceae
- Genus: Prostanthera
- Species: P. discolor

Binomial name
- Prostanthera discolor R.T.Baker
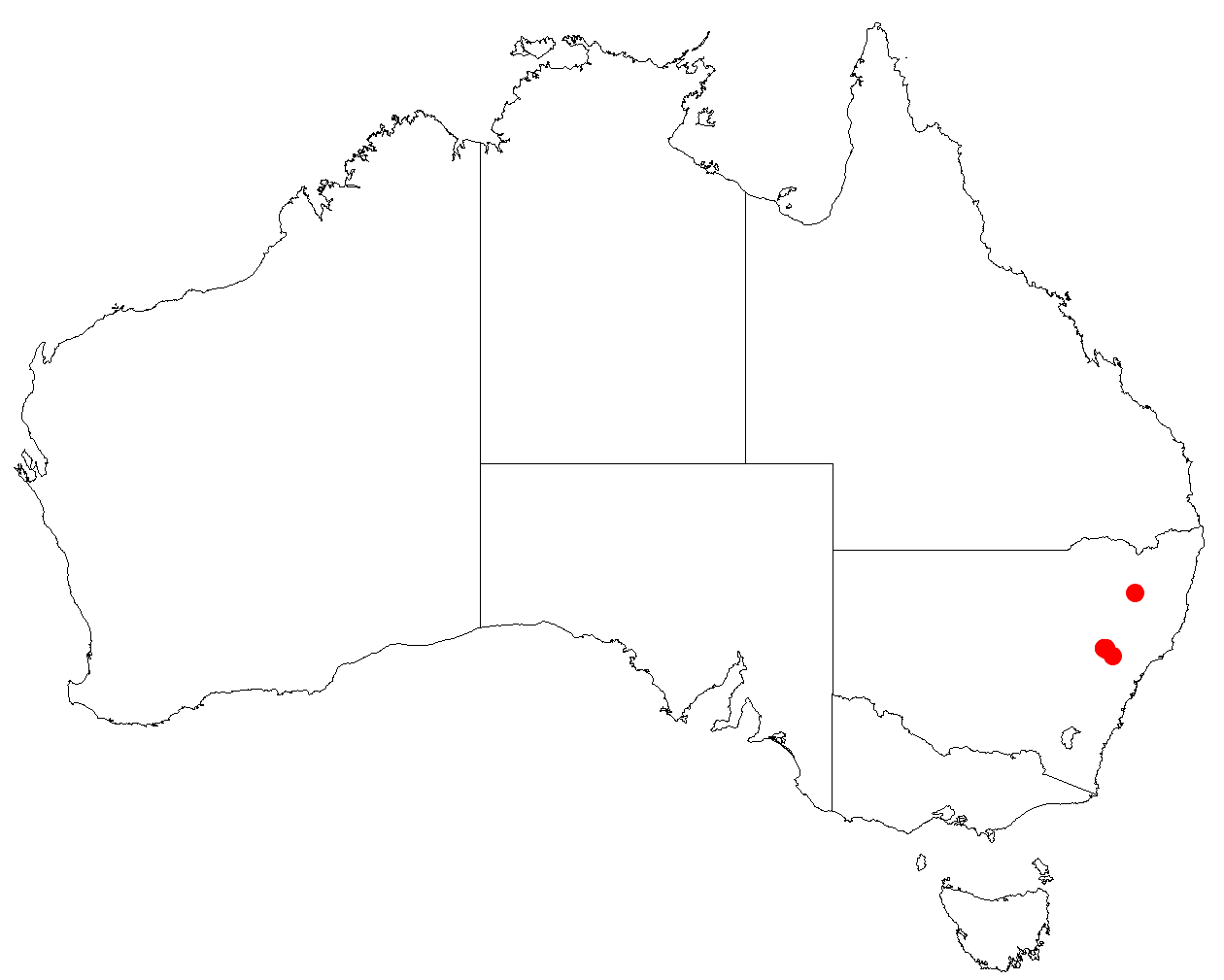
- Occurrence data from AVH

= Prostanthera discolor =

Goulburn River mintbush

Species of flowering plant

Prostanthera discolor commonly known as Goulburn River mintbush,is a species of flowering plant in the family Lamiaceae and is endemic to a small area of New South Wales. It is an open, erect, strongly aromatic shrub with lance-shaped to oblong leaves, and deep mauve to purple flowers with darker spots inside.

== Description ==
Prostanthera discolor is an open, erect, aromatic, often compact shrub that typically grows to a height of 0.6–3 m (2 ft 0 in – 9 ft 10 in) and has hairy, glandular branches. The leaves are dull, dark green, paler on the lower side, mostly glabrous, lance-shaped to more or less oblong, 8–28 mm (0.31–1.10 in) long and 1–5 mm (0.039–0.197 in) wide on a petiole 1–3 mm (0.039–0.118 in) long. The flowers are arranged singly in the upper leaf axils with bracteoles about 1–2 mm (0.039–0.079 in) long at the base. The sepals are 4–5 mm (0.16–0.20 in) long and form a tube 2–2.5 mm (0.079–0.098 in) wide with two lobes, the upper lobe 4–5 mm (0.16–0.20 in) long. The petals are deep mauve to purple with darker markings inside the petal tube, and 7–10 mm (0.28–0.39 in) long. Flowering occurs from September to October.

== Taxonomy and naming ==
Prostanthera discolor was first formally described in 1896 by Richard Thomas Baker in Proceedings of the Linnean Society of New South Wales.

== Distribution and habitat ==
This mint bush grows in forest in gullies, often in rocky sites in the Sandy Hollow–Merriwa district.

== Conservation status ==
This mintbush is listed as "vulnerable" under the Australian Government Environment Protection and Biodiversity Conservation Act 1999 and the New South Wales Government Biodiversity Conservation Act 2016. In the year 2000, the entire population of the species was estimated to be 110 individuals. The main threats to the species include eutrophication of nearby streams, grazing by goats and the species' small population size.
