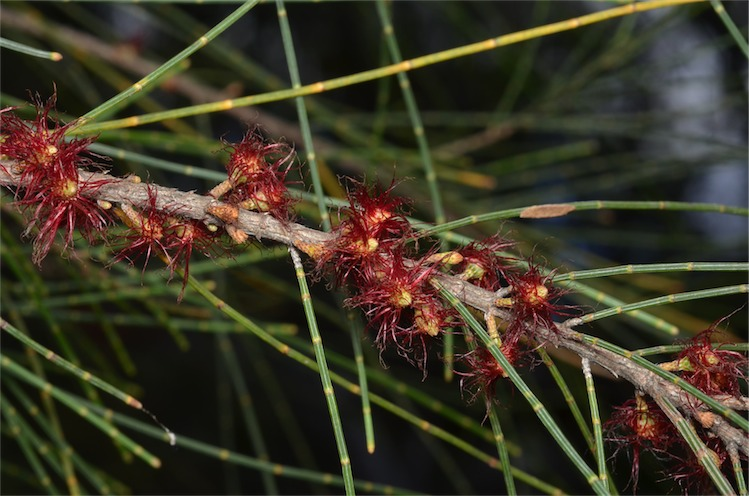
- Branchlets and immature female cones

Scientific classification
- Kingdom: Plantae
- Clade: Tracheophytes
- Clade: Angiosperms
- Clade: Eudicots
- Clade: Rosids
- Order: Fagales
- Family: Casuarinaceae
- Genus: Allocasuarina
- Species: A. gymnanthera

Binomial name
- Allocasuarina gymnanthera L.A.S.Johnson
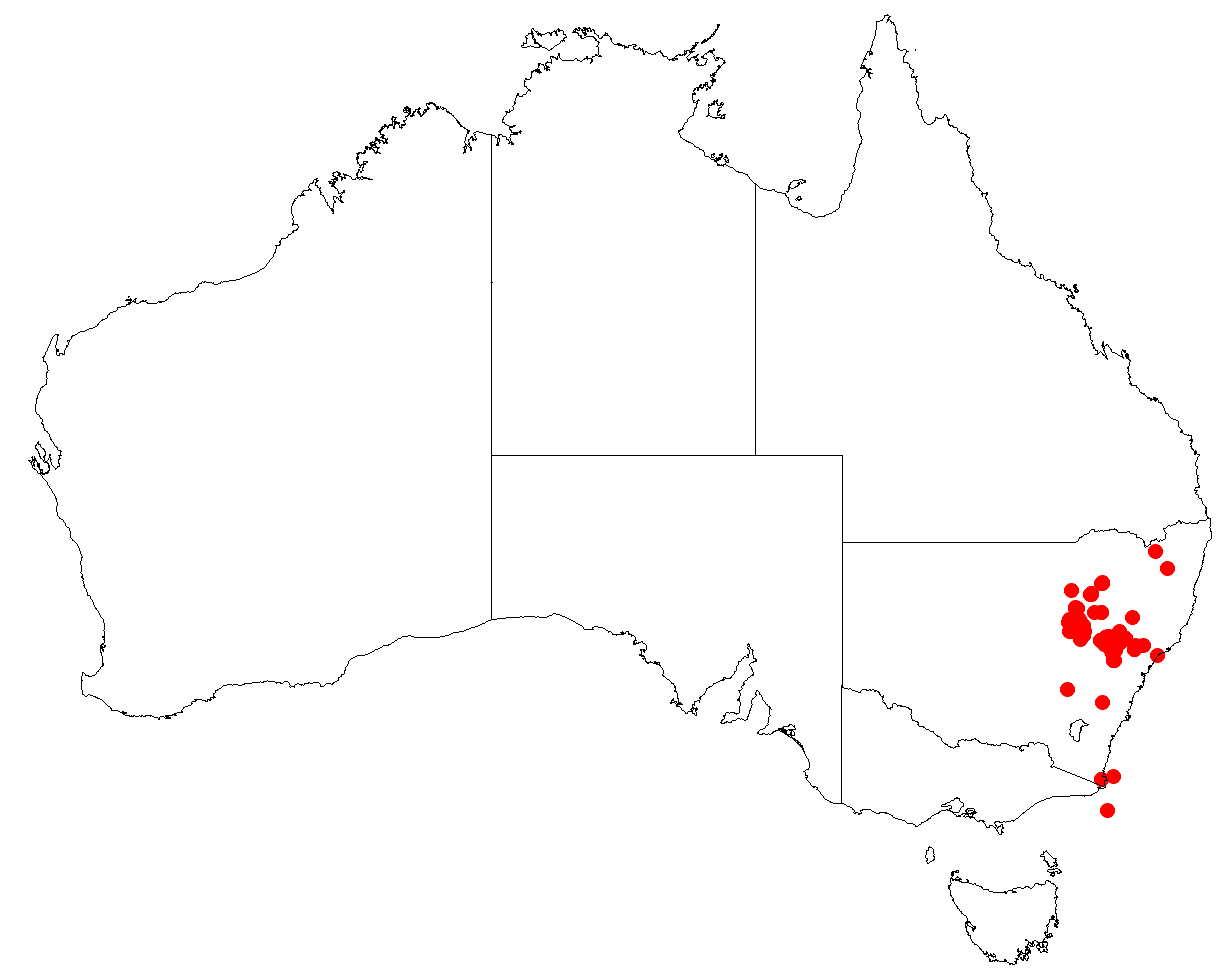
- Occurrence data from AVH

= Allocasuarina gymnanthera =

Species of flowering plant

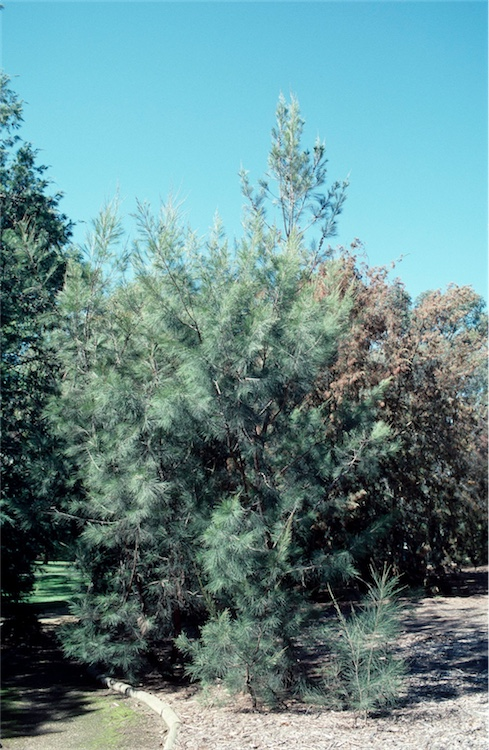
Habit in the Australian National Botanic Gardens

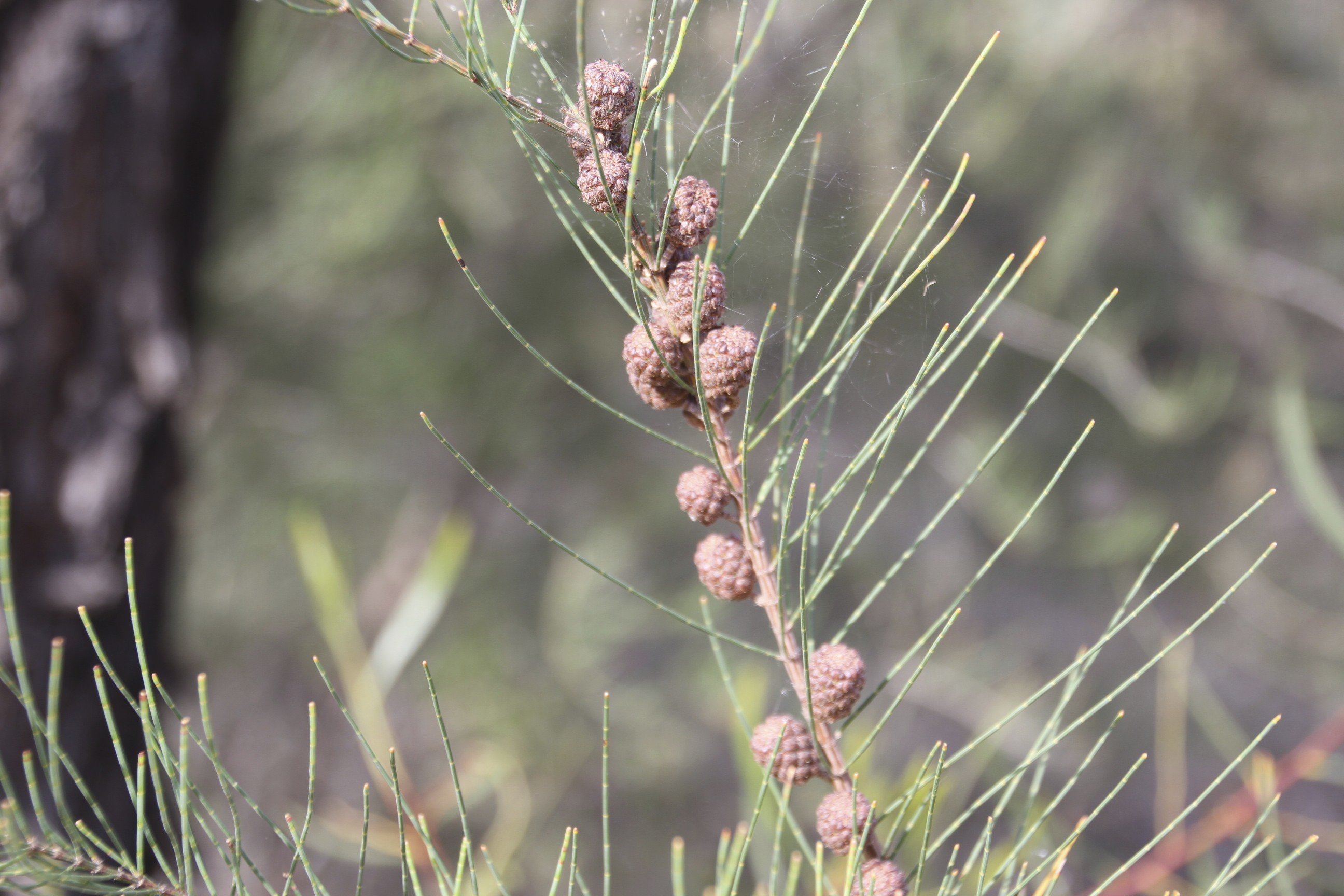
Mature female cones near Gilgandra

Allocasuarina gymnanthera is a species of flowering plant in the family Casuarinaceae and is endemic to eastern New South Wales. It is a dioecious shrub or tree that has more or less erect branchlets up to 200 mm (7.9 in) long, the leaves reduced to scales in whorls of six to eight, the fruiting cones 14–40 mm (0.55–1.57 in) long containing winged seeds (samaras) 4.5–7.0 mm (0.18–0.28 in) long.

== Description ==
Allocasuarina gymnanthera is a dioecious shrub or tree that typically grows to a height of 2–5 m (6 ft 7 in – 16 ft 5 in). Its branchlets are more or less erect, up to 200 mm (7.9 in) long, the leaves reduced to erect, scale-like teeth 0.4–0.7 mm (0.016–0.028 in) long, arranged in whorls of six to eight around the branchlets. The sections of branchlet between the leaf whorls (the "articles") are 5–12 mm (0.20–0.47 in) long and 0.5–1.0 mm (0.020–0.039 in) wide. Male flowers are arranged like a string of beads, in spikes 25–60 mm (0.98–2.36 in) long, with three to five whorls per centimetre (per 0.39 in.), the anthers 0.8–1.4 mm (0.031–0.055 in) long. Female cones are cylindrical, on a peduncle 3–8 mm (0.12–0.31 in) long, the mature cones 14–40 mm (0.55–1.57 in) long and 9–12 mm (0.35–0.47 in) in diameter, the samaras dark brown to black and 4.5–7.0 mm (0.18–0.28 in) long.

== Taxonomy ==
Allocasuarina gymnanthera was first described in 1989 by Lawrie Johnson in Flora of Australia. The specific epithet, (gymnanthera) means "naked flowers".

== Distribution and habitat ==
This she-oak grows in open woodland on sandy soil on sandstone ridges between the Pilliga Scrub, Ulan, Baerami, Singleton and Glen Davis in eastern New South Wales.
