= Bylong Valley Way =

Road in New South Wales, Australia

Bylong Valley Way New South Wales
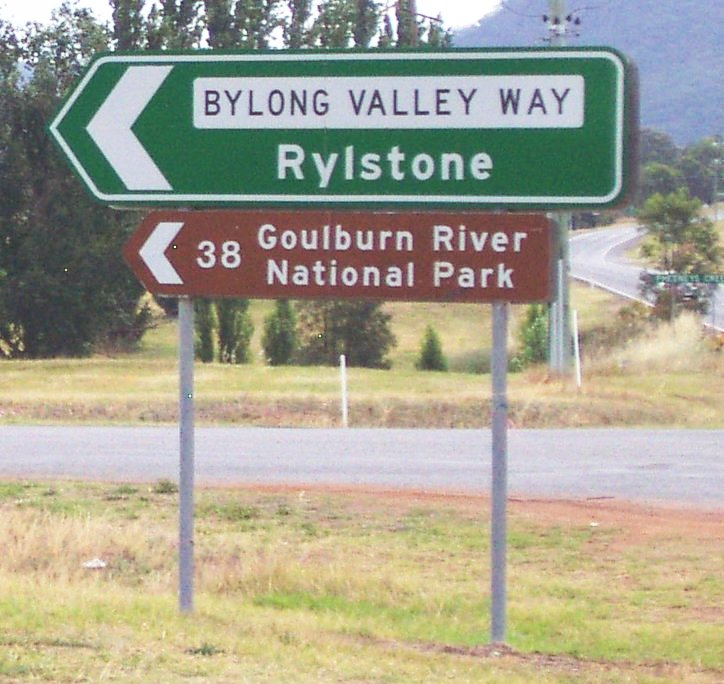
- Direction sign off Golden Highway at Sandy Hollow
- Coordinates: 32.340870°S 150.580173°E (Northeast end); 32.942229°S 149.859847°E (Southwest end)

General information
- Type: Rural road
- Length: 138.3 km (86 mi)
- Gazetted: August 1928

Major junctions
- Northeast end: Golden Highway; Sandy Hollow, New South Wales
- Wollar Road
- Southwest end: Castlereagh Highway; Ilford, New South Wales

Location(s)
- Major settlements: Baerami, Bylong, Rylstone, Kandos

Bylong Valley Way is a New South Wales regional road linking Golden Highway near Sandy Hollow to Castlereagh Highway near Ilford. It is named after the Bylong Valley, through which the road passes.

== Route ==
Bylong Valley Way commences at the intersection with Golden Highway just south of Sandy Hollow and heads in a westerly direction, crossing the Goulburn River nearly immediately and then generally follows it along its southern bank through Baerami and Goulburn River National Park to Bylong, where it meets Wollar Road, and turns in a southerly direction and travels through Rylstone and Kandos until it eventually terminates at an intersection with Castlereagh Highway just north of Ilford.

In conjunction with the Bathurst-Ilford Road to Bathurst, this route provides a leisurely alternative to going through Sydney to travel between the Hunter Region and Central Tablelands.

== History ==
The passing of the Main Roads Act of 1924 through the Parliament of New South Wales provided for the declaration of Main Roads, roads partially funded by the State government through the Main Roads Board (MRB). Main Road No. 208 was declared from Sandy Hollow to Bylong (and continuing west via Wollar to Mudgee, and east via Wybong to the intersection with Great Northern Highway, today New England Highway, at Muswellbrook), and Main Road No. 215 was declared from Bylong via Rylstone to Ilford, on the same day, 8 August 1928. With the passing of the Main Roads (Amendment) Act of 1929 to provide for additional declarations of State Highways and Trunk Roads, these were amended to Main Roads 208 and 215 on 8 April 1929. The eastern end of Main Road 208 was later truncated from Muswellbrook to Sandy Hollow on 22 November 1996.

The passing of the Roads Act of 1993 updated road classifications and the way they could be declared within New South Wales. Under this act, Bylong Valley Way retains its declaration as Main Road 215 (from Bylong to Ilford), and part of Main Road 208 (Sandy Hollow to Bylong).

=== Sealing ===
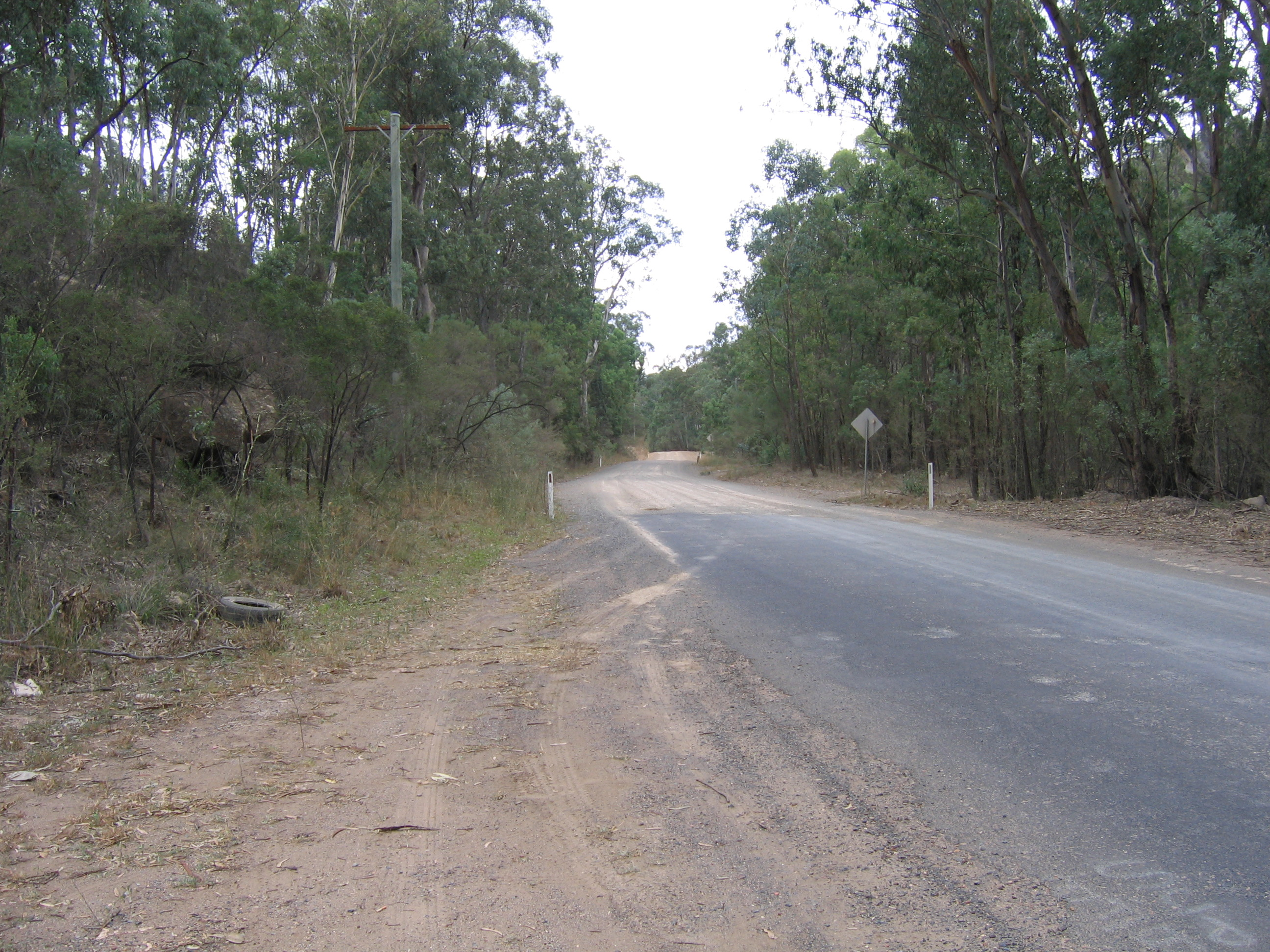
Bylong Valley Way near Coxs Gap and railway line, looking west towards gravel road surface

Bylong Valley Way was not fully sealed in the Mid-Western Regional Council area until February 2009. Sealing of the road had been a political issue for decades. At the beginning of 2007, there were four sections of unsealed road totalling 32 kilometres. Two sections were between Coxs Gap and Bylong with only 850 metres of sealed road between them. The other two were south of Bylong on the way towards Rylstone, where two kilometres had been sealed a few years earlier, converting one long unsealed section to two shorter ones.

On 13 December 2006, The federal government announced A$2 million of AusLink funding towards the $4.1 million cost of completion of sealing of the Bylong Valley Way. Under the announced funding arrangement, the Roads & Traffic Authority contributed $900,000 and the Mid-Western Regional Council was to contribute the remaining $1.2 million. The overall cost slightly exceed the budgeted $4.1 million, with the council having to cover the overrun.

The sealing work was carried out by Mid-Western Regional Council and was completed in three stages:

==== Stage One ====
- March 2007 to June 2007
- Sealing of two sections totalling six kilometres south of Bylong
- Widening a total of nine kilometres of remaining unsealed road in preparation for sealing in the later stages

==== Stage Two ====
- July 2007 to June 2008
- Sealing of two remaining unsealed sections south of Bylong totalling 12.42 kilometres
- Sealing of one section one kilometre long adjacent to existing sealed section east of Bylong
- Preparatory works for stage three

==== Stage Three ====
- July 2008 to March 2009
- Completion of sealing, consisting of two sections east of Bylong totalling 12.6 kilometres

== National Park access ==
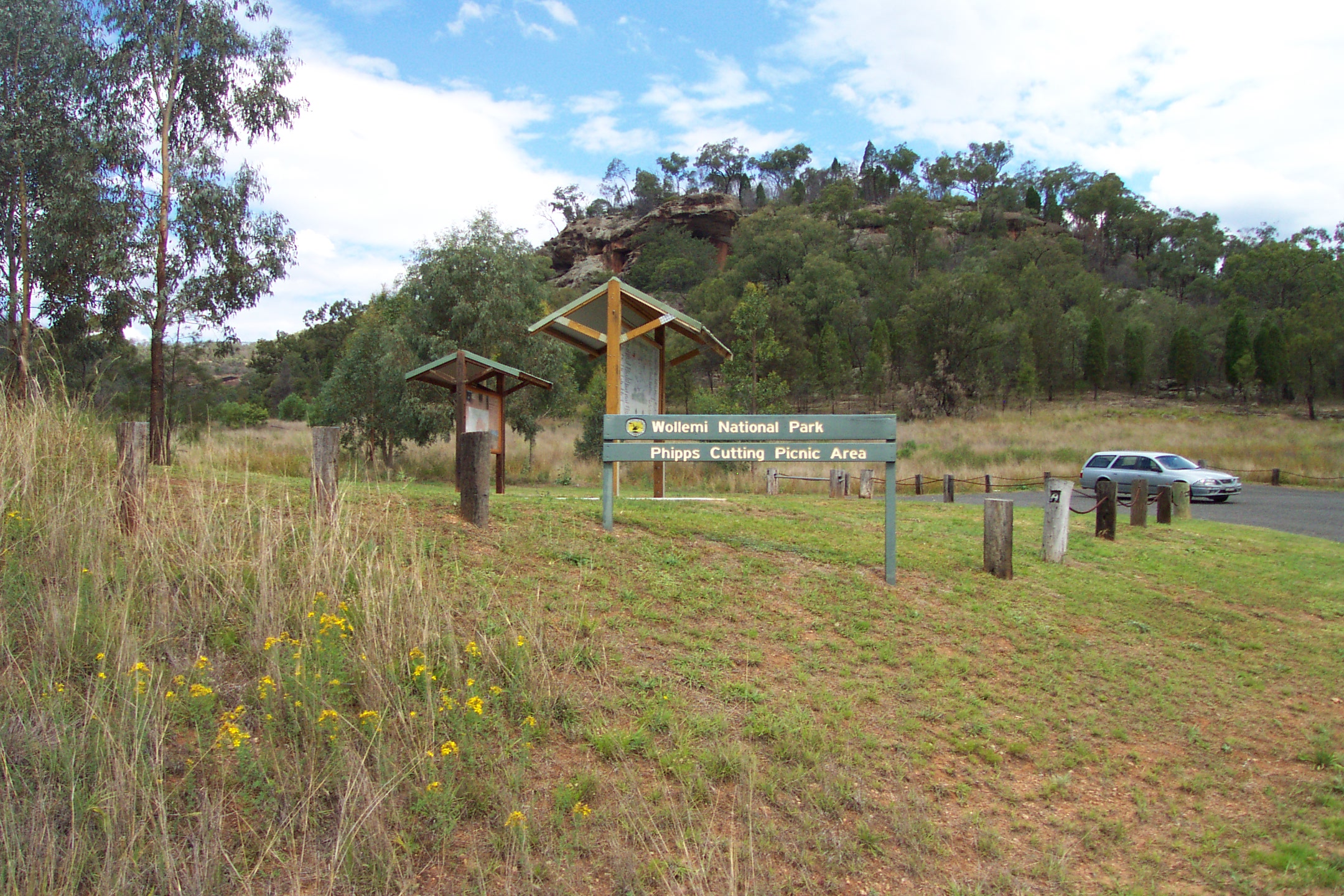
Phipps Cutting picnic area

Access to the Wollemi National Park and Goulburn River National Park is available at various points along the road between the Golden Highway and Bylong. Over Coxs Gap, the Bylong Valley Way is flanked by the two national parks. Camping areas are available in the Wollemi National Park on the western side of Coxs Gap, and the Phipps Cutting picnic area between Baerami and Widden Creek provides an entry point for hiking in the Wollemi National Park.

== Tourism ==
Following completion of sealing of the road, the Muswellbrook Chamber of Commerce and Industry created a web site (no longer available by 2020) for the road, to promote it as a tourist route.

The section of Bylong Valley Way east of Bylong is also part of two separately-promoted tourist routes.

A self-drive tour loop route originating in Sandy Hollow, promoted as Upper Hunter Tourist Drive number 4, uses this section of road to travel west, then turns north on other local roads to rejoin Golden Highway. The Phipps Cutting picnic area is shown as a rest area on that route.

The Tablelands Way tourist route between Canberra and Muswellbrook uses this section of Bylong Valley Way as part of the route between Mudgee and Muswellbrook.

== Bridges ==
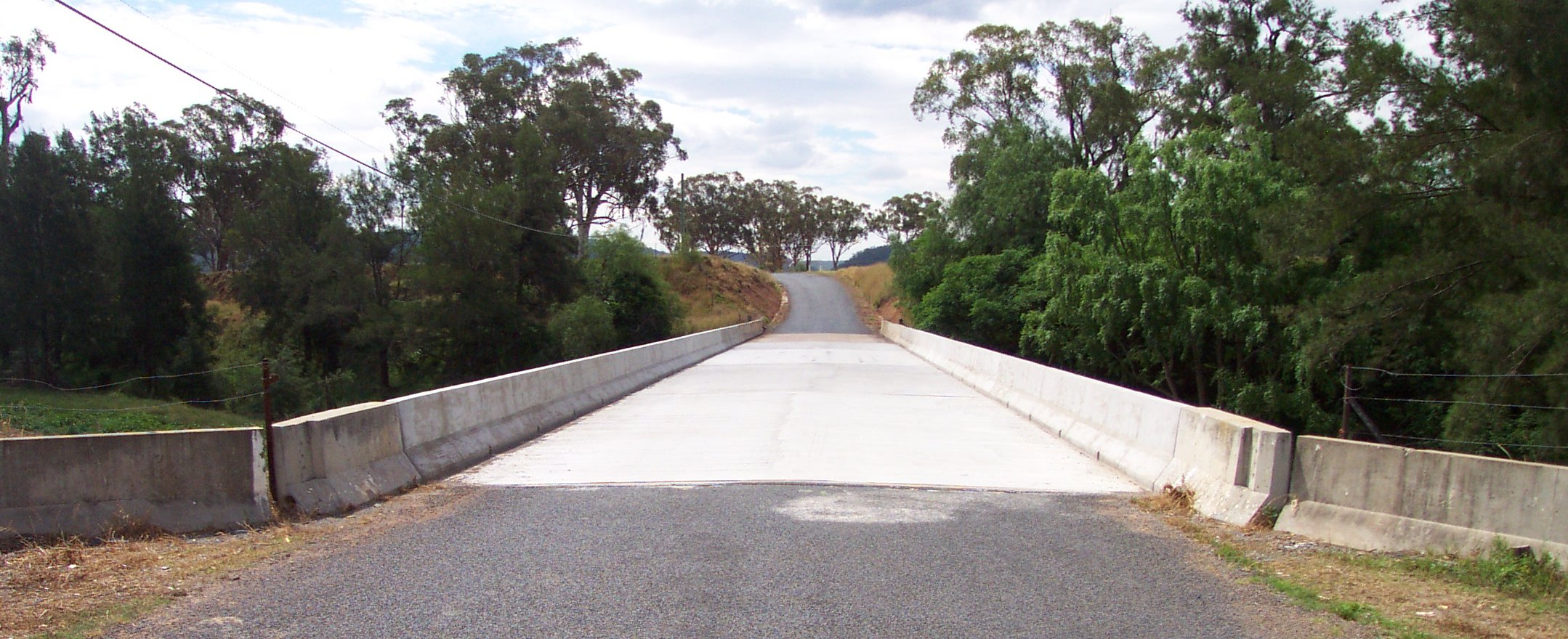
Kirk's Bridge at Baerami after new concrete sections were completed, November 2007

=== Muswellbrook Shire Council ===
The dilapidated timber sections of Kirks Bridge, crossing Baerami Creek at Baerami were demolished and were planned to be replaced with new concrete sections by 31 August 2007. Unfortunately, flooding during the 2007 New South Wales storms delayed the work by around a month. The bridge had previously been partially rebuilt, with both buttresses and two spans at one end having been reconstructed in concrete.

Muswellbrook Shire Council maintained a temporary deviation on private property for several years to allow access during bridgework and for heavy vehicles. After the bridge was reopened, that deviation was removed and the land returned to its owner.

The single-lane timber bridge over Widden Creek has also been replaced. Muswellbrook Shire Council had committed to spend $480,000 by 30 June 2007 to Manage the investigation, design and construction works but the discovery of a serious problem on Kirks Bridge saw that money diverted to the more urgent project. Muswellbrook Shire Council subsequently replaced the Widden Creek bridge between January and June 2009 at a cost of approximately A$910,000.

Once the Widden Creek bridge was replaced, the 38 tonne load limit was lifted, allowing heavy vehicles to again use this route.

=== Mid-Western Regional Council ===
Mid-Western Regional council plan to replace the single lane Carwell Bridge between Kandos and Ilford between mid-2009 and mid-2010.

== Railway ==
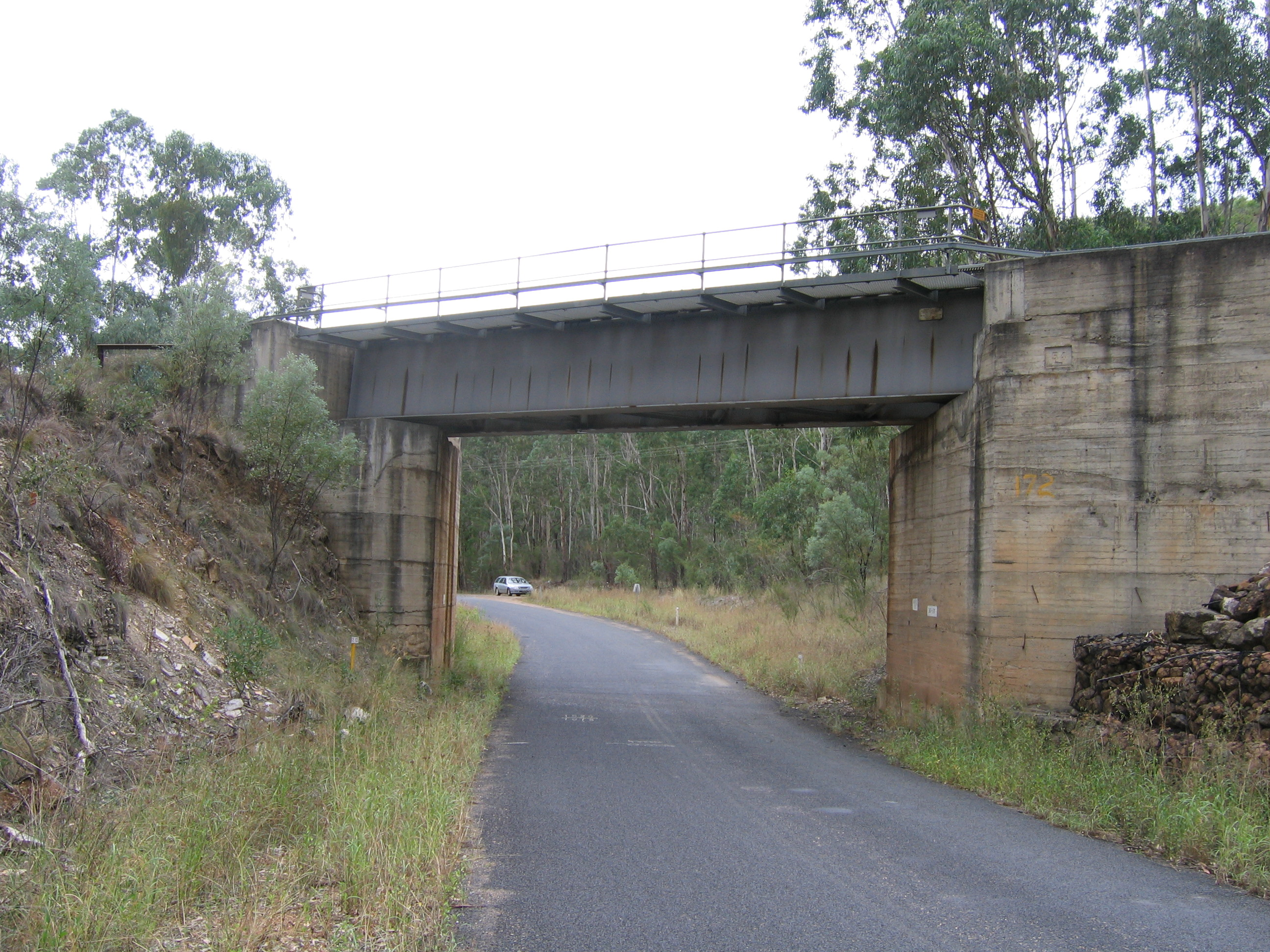
Rail bridge carrying Ulan line over Bylong Valley Way near Coxs Gap

The Sandy Hollow-Gulgong railway line and part of the Merriwa railway line, which form the Australian Rail Track Corporation's Ulan line between Muswellbrook and Gulgong, follow the same valleys as the Bylong Valley Way from near the Golden Highway to near Bylong, where the railway line continues west as the road turns south.

The Ulan line crosses the road three times, twice at level crossings and once on a bridge over the road. One level crossing is close to Golden Highway while the other is close to Bylong. The railway bridge is on the western side of Coxs Gap, between the level crossings.

The Gwabegar railway line crosses the road on at a level crossing the northern side of Rylstone. All three of the level crossings have flashing warning lights but not boom gates.

== Major intersections ==
LGA	Location	km	mi	Destinations	Notes
Muswellbrook	Sandy Hollow	0	0.0	Golden Highway (B84) – Merriwa, Denman	Northeastern terminus of road
Muswellbrook	Sandy Hollow	0.5	0.31	Sandy Hollow–Gulgong railway line	
Goulburn River		0.85	0.53	Bridge over river (no known name)	
Muswellbrook	Baerami	8.0	5.0	Yarrawa Road – Denman	
Baerami Creek		13.9	8.6	Kirks Bridge	
Widden Brook		26.2	16.3	Bridge over river (no known name)	
Mid-Western	Bylong	59.6	37.0	Sandy Hollow–Gulgong railway line	
Mid-Western	Bylong	59.6	37.0	Wollar Road – Wollar, Ulan	
Mid-Western	Rylstone	109.1	67.8	Lue Road – Lue, Mudgee	
Mid-Western	Rylstone	112.6	70.0	Gwabegar railway line	
Mid-Western	Rylstone	114.3	71.0	Fitzgerald Street, to Glen Alice Road – Glen Alice, Capertee	
Mid-Western	Kandos	120.5	74.9	Cooper Drive – Clandulla	T junction
Mid-Western	Ilford	138.3	85.9	Castlereagh Highway (B55) – Mudgee, Marrangaroo	Southwestern terminus of road
1.000 mi = 1.609 km; 1.000 km = 0.621 mi: Route transition

== See also ==
- Highways in Australia
- List of highways in New South Wales

== Gallery ==
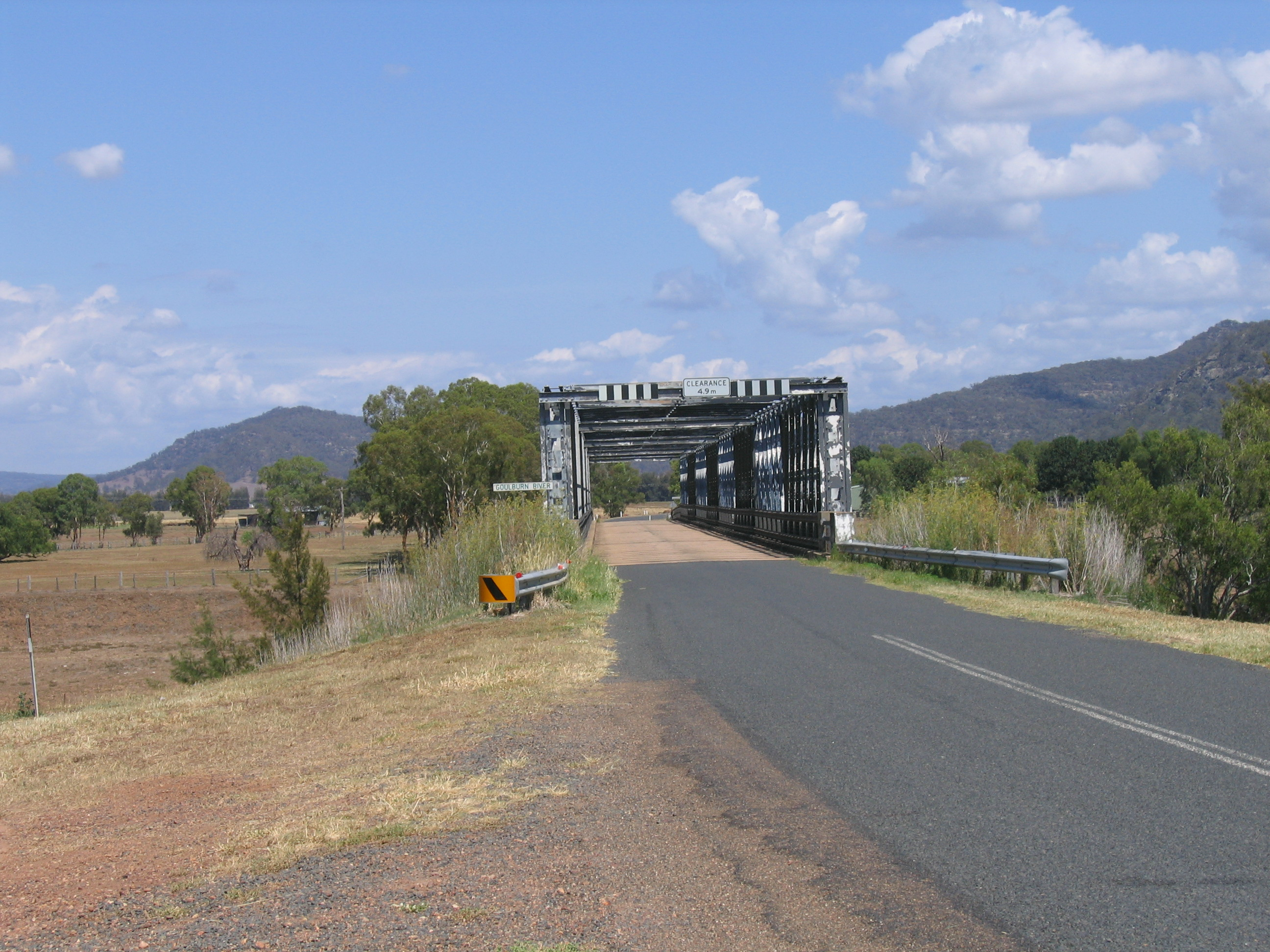
Bridge over Goulburn River near Sandy Hollow

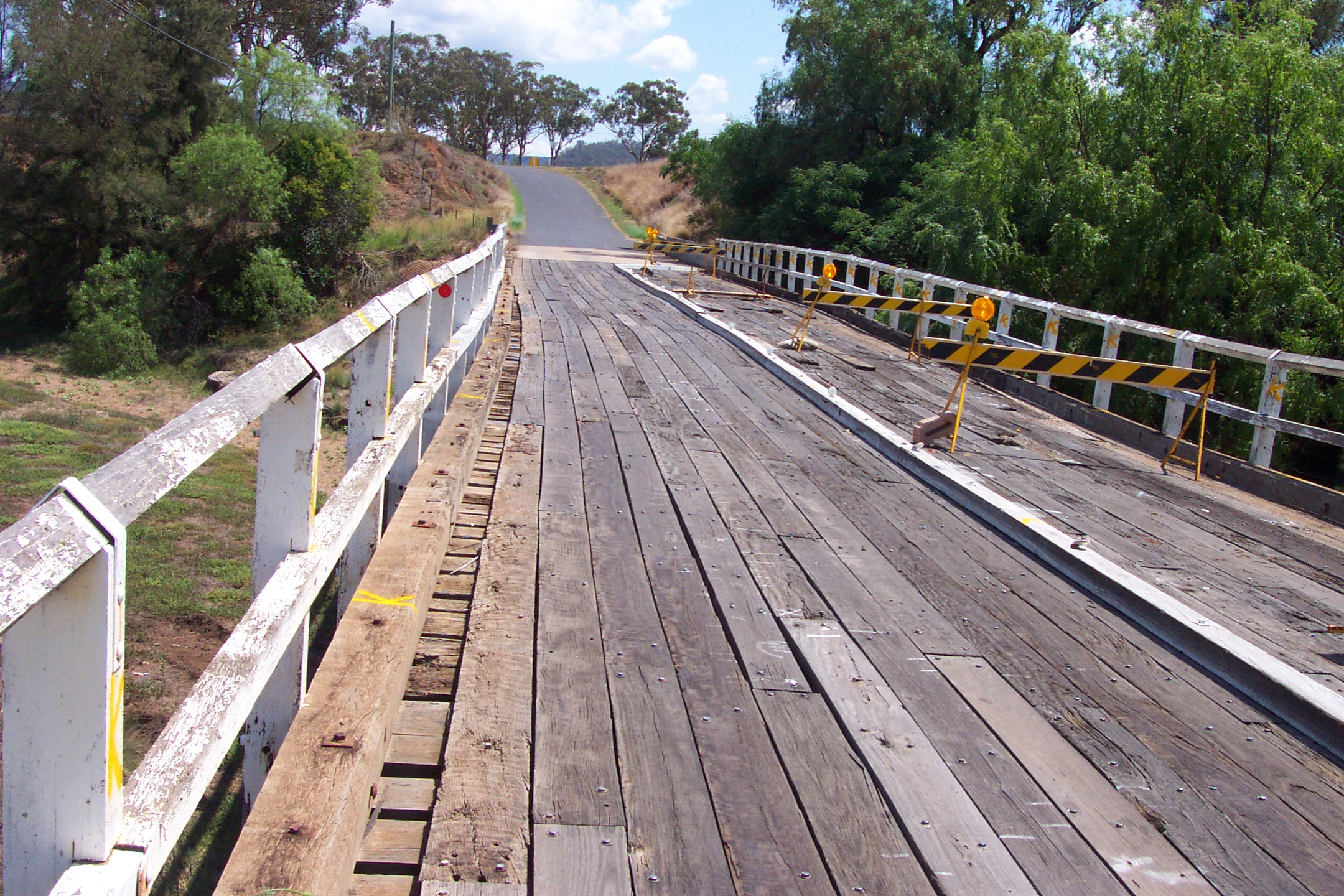
Kirks Bridge at Baerami, February 2007

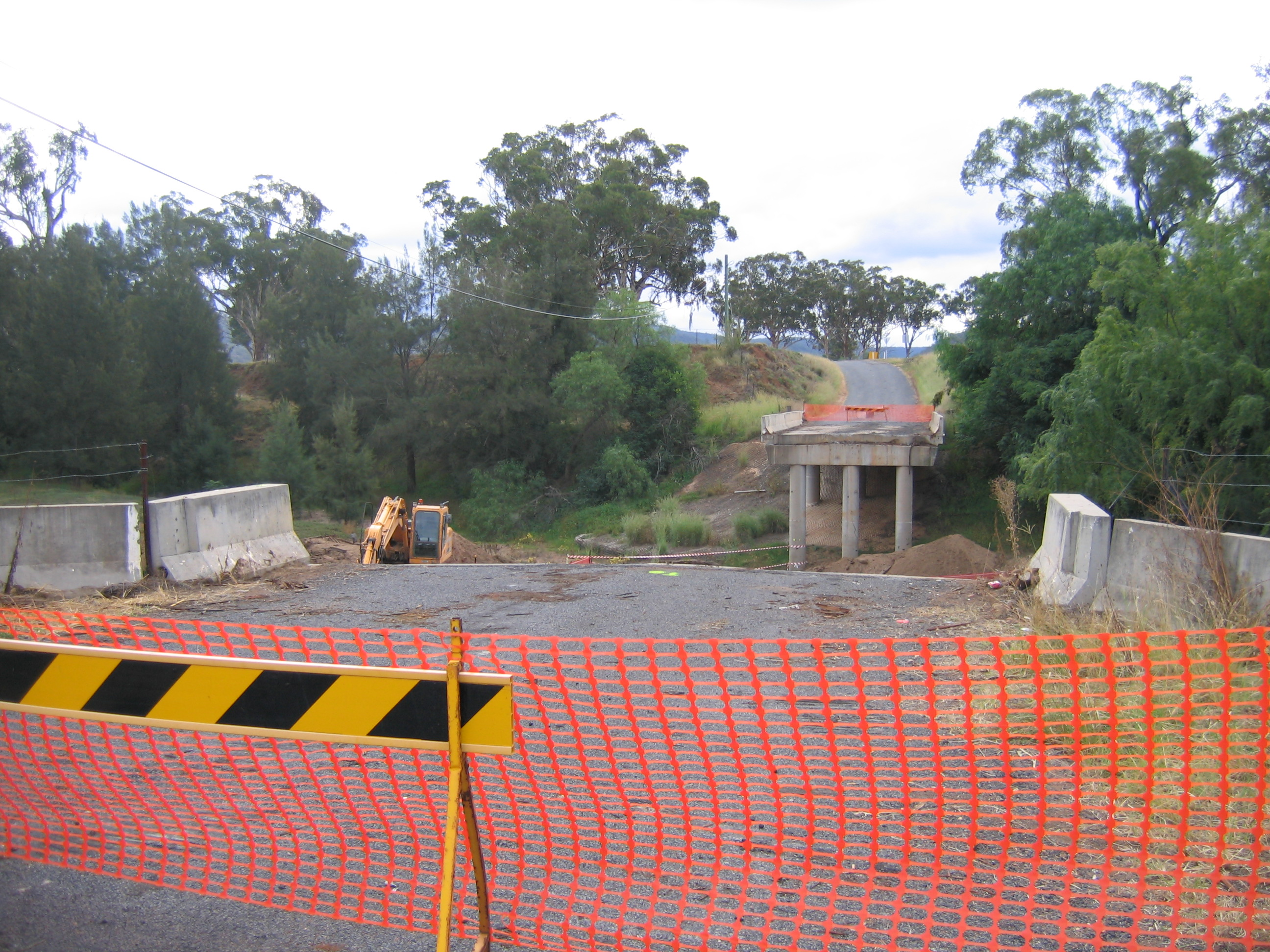
Kirks Bridge at Baerami after timber section was demolished, April 2007

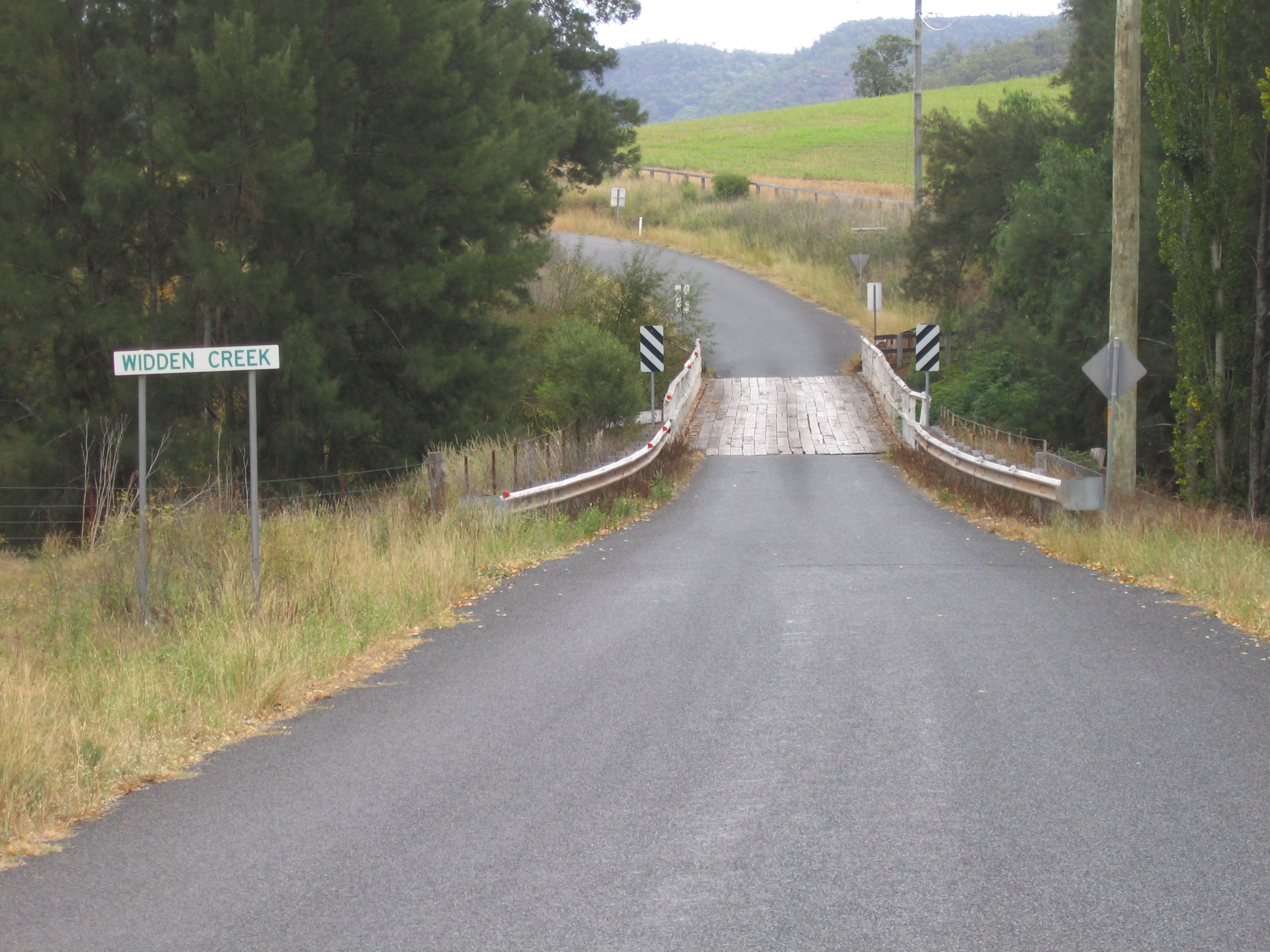
Single lane bridge across Widden Creek

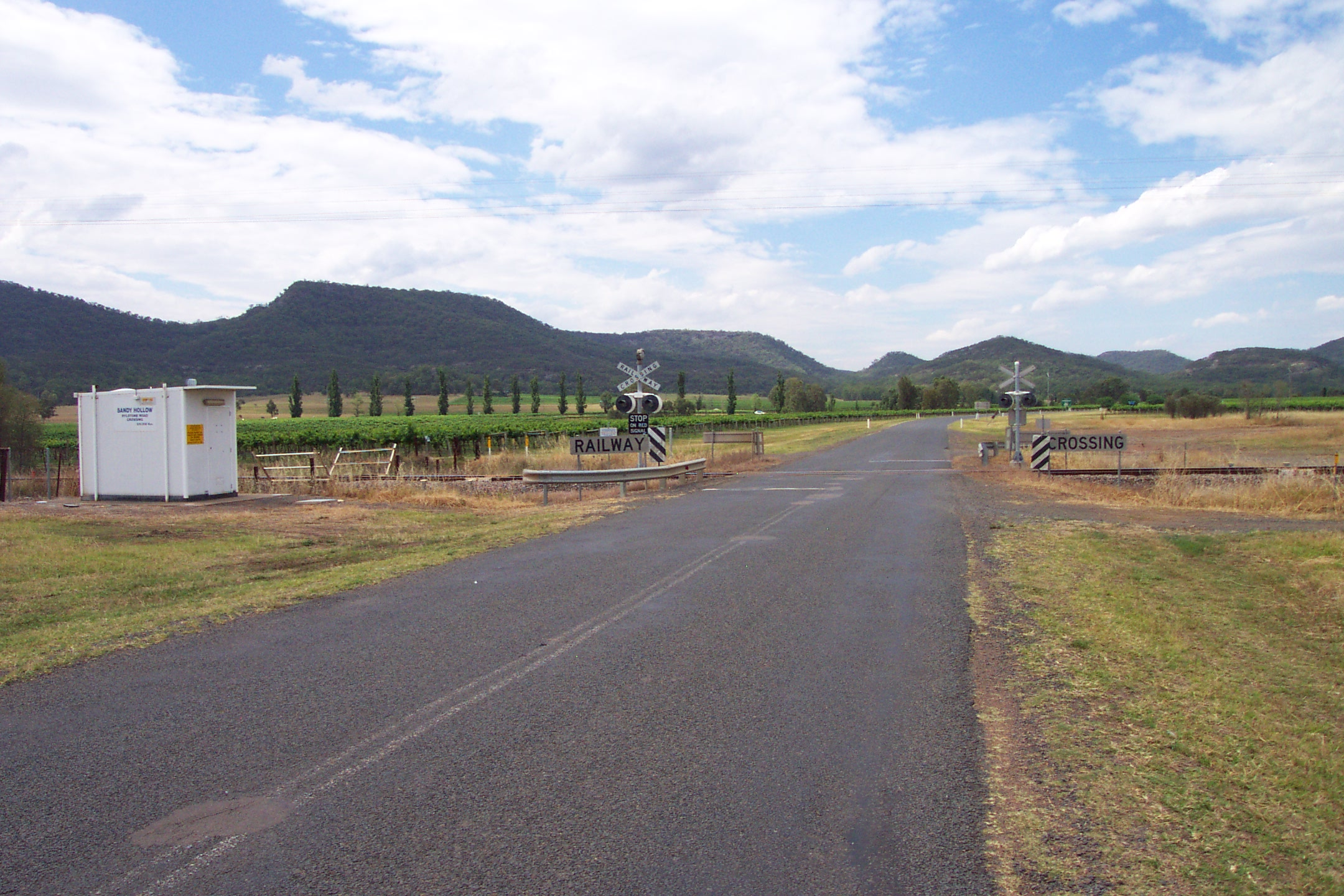
Level crossing where the line crosses Bylong Valley Way near Sandy Hollow

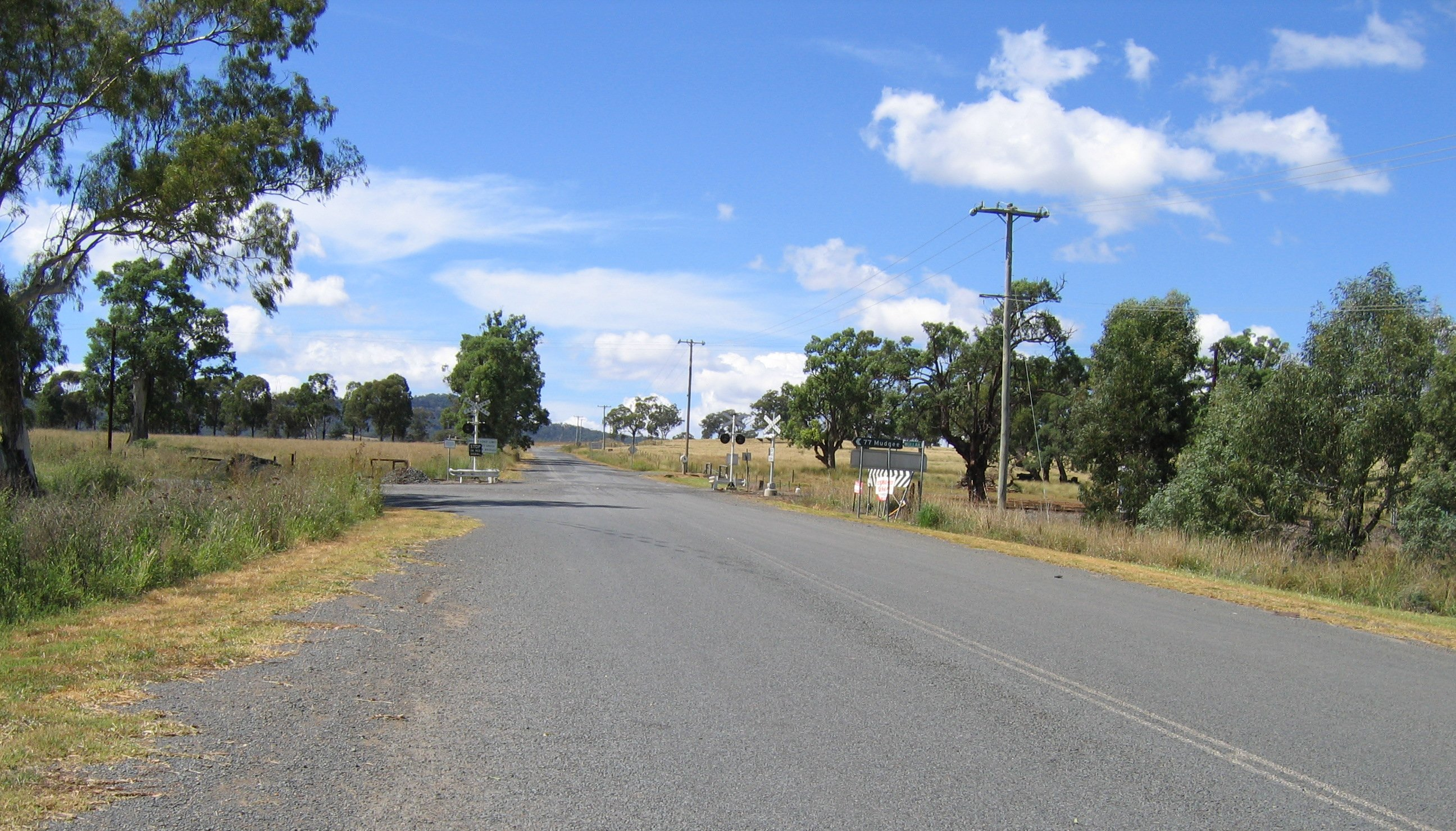
Railway level crossing and turnoff to Mudgee via Wollar, just north of the village of Bylong
