= Wattle Flat =

Wattle Flat may refer to the following places in Australia:

- Wattle Flat, New South Wales
- Wattle Flat, South Australia
- Wattle Flat, Victoria
