= Gungal, New South Wales =

Coordinates: 32.27°S 150.50°E

Gungal is a locality in the Upper Hunter Shire of New South Wales, Australia. It is within the GMT+11 time zone.

Gungal is located on the Golden Highway, between Sandy Hollow and Merriwa. The abandoned Merriwa branch of the railway crossed the main road at a level crossing at Gungal.
