= Bylong Valley =

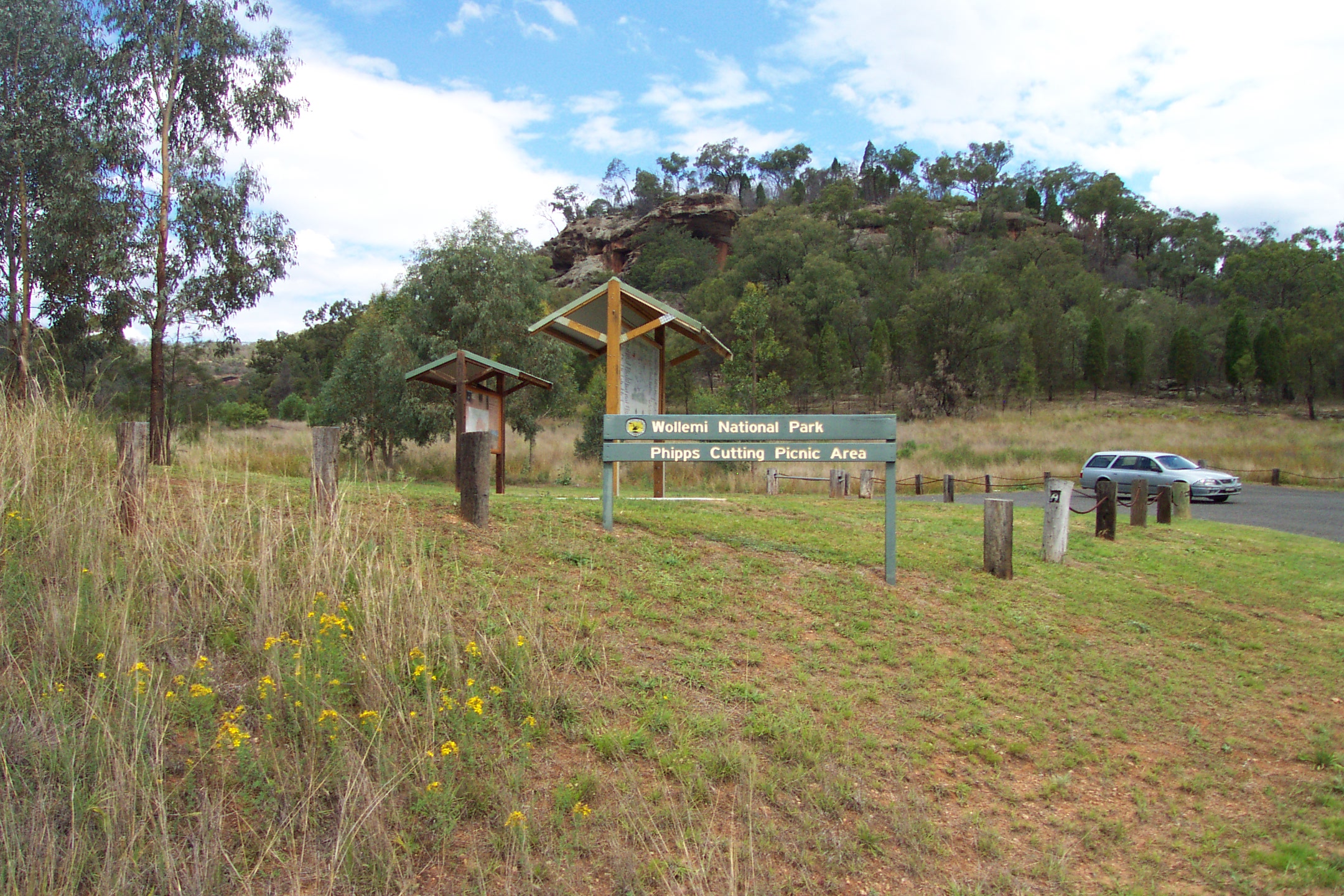
A picnic area in the Bylong Valley.

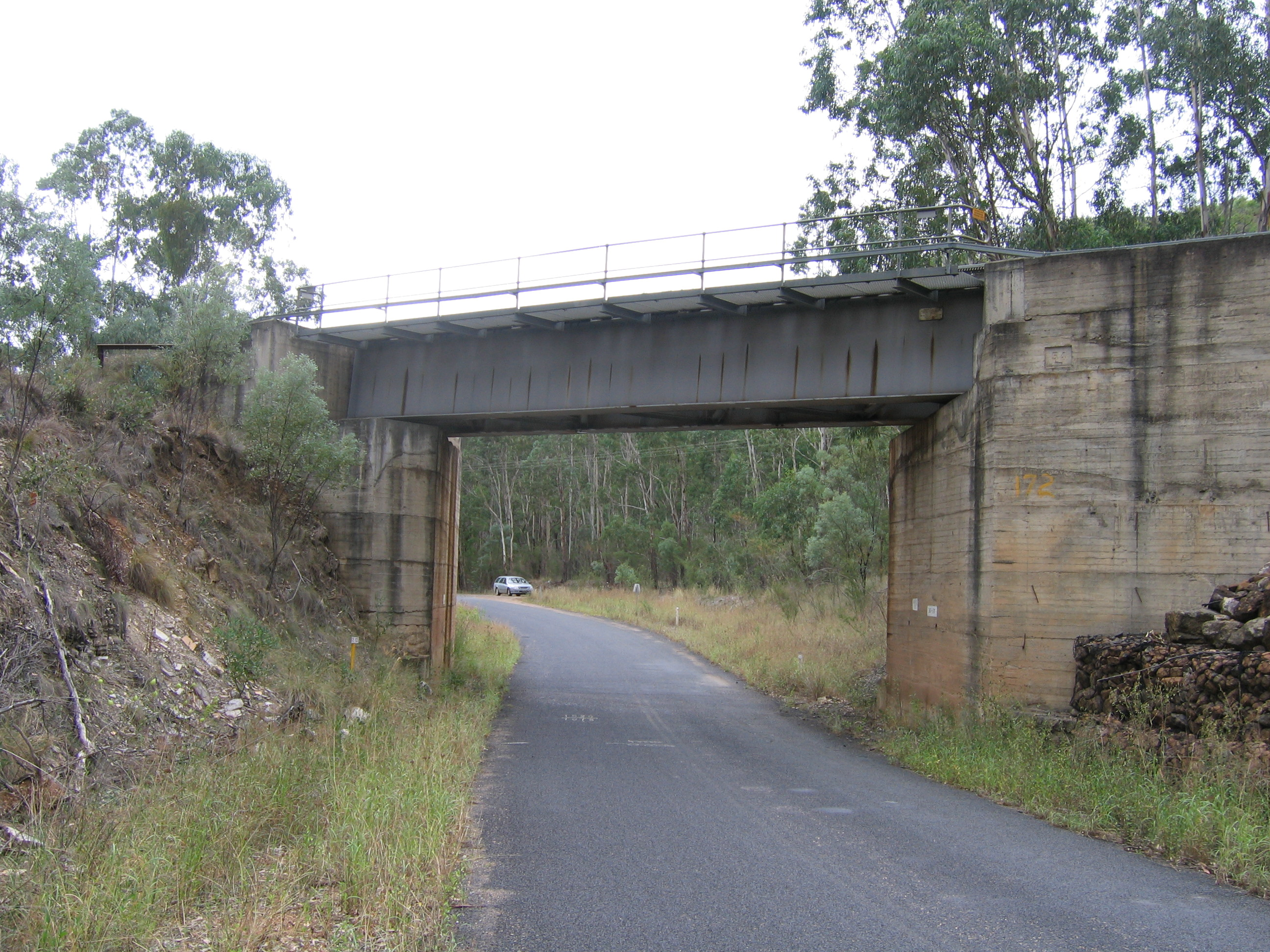
A railbridge over the Bylong Valley Way.

The Bylong Valley is a winding but relatively flat valley that crosses the Great Dividing Range between the Goulburn River National Park and Wollemi National Park, west of the upper Hunter Region in New South Wales, Australia.

The picturesque countryside was the site of Aboriginal and early European settlements. Traveling in this scenic valley reveals its cultural heritage as well as sightings of wombats, wallabies and kangaroos.

The valley is split by a short ridge roughly one third of the way from its western end. The headwaters start in the Great Dividing Range to the north-west on Nullo Mountain.

The Bylong Valley carries the Sandy Hollow-Gulgong cross-country railway line, which passes under Cox's Gap with a tunnel, and the Bylong Valley Way, which climbs over the ridge through the gap. The path across this ridge is steep and winding.

The boundary between Muswellbrook Shire Council and the Mid-Western Regional Council area is on the crest of Cox's Gap.

== See also ==
- List of valleys of Australia
