= Baerami, New South Wales =

Baerami
- Town
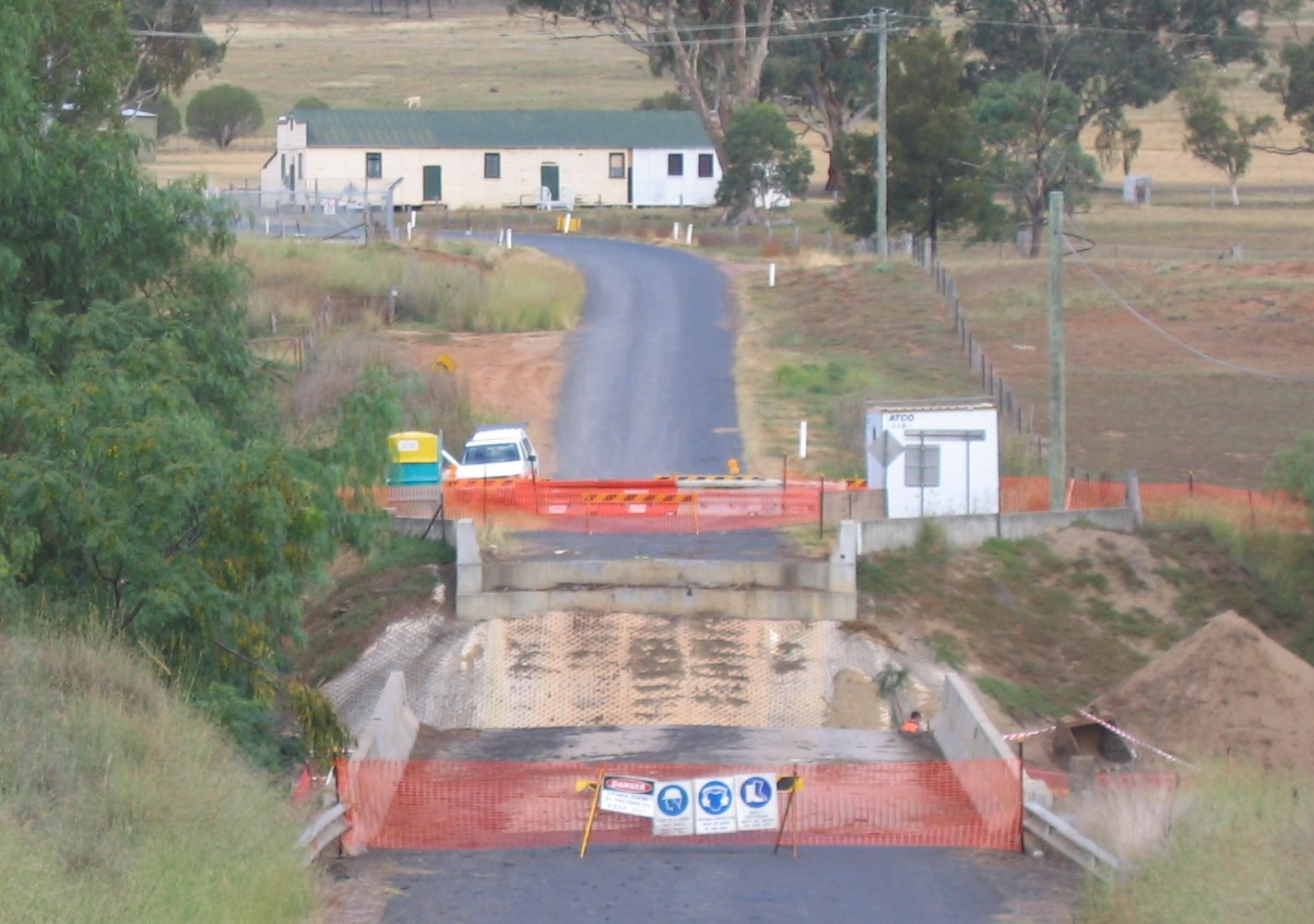
- Kirks Bridge and Baerami community hall

- Coordinates: 32°23′15″S 150°28′05″E
- Country: Australia
- State: New South Wales
- Region: Upper Hunter
- LGA: Muswellbrook Shire
- Location: 180 km (110 mi) NNW of Sydney; 160 km (99 mi) WNW of Newcastle; 21 km (13 mi) WNW of Denman

Government
  - State electorate: Upper Hunter
  - Federal division: New England
- Elevation: 165 m (541 ft)

Population
  - Total: 93 (SAL 2021)
- Time zone: UTC+10 (AEST)
  - Summer (DST): UTC+11 (AEDT)
- Postcode: 2333
- County: Hunter
- Parish: Baerami
Localities around Baerami
| | | Sandy Hollow |
| Widden | Baerami |
| | Baerami Creek |

Baerami is a locality in the Muswellbrook Shire in the Upper Hunter region of New South Wales, Australia.

The Bylong Valley Way crosses the Baerami Creek via Kirks Bridge at Baerami. Downstream of the bridge, the creek meets its confluence with the Goulburn River.

The area now known as Baerami lies on the traditional lands of Wonnarua people.

The name Baerami comes from a large landholding that was subdivided into smaller pieces of land in 1926. The homestead 'Baerami House', built in 1875, still exists. The origin of the word Baerami is likely a settler rendering of an Aboriginal said to mean 'a spear thrower'.

The name of Baerami is associated with a deposit of oil shale, which was reputedly the largest in New South Wales and around twice the size of that at Glen Davis. However, the site where mining occurred lies on Baerami Creek, approximately 25 km south of the road junction that is near the crossing of Baerami Creek at Baerami, in the adjacent locality of Baerami Creek.

The Sandy Hollow-Gulgong goods railway line passes through the locality.

Points of interest include Baerami Community Hall, James Estate, Dingo Gully, and the old Baerami Catholic Church.

== See also ==
- Bylong
- Sandy Hollow
- Baerami Creek
- Denman

| Preceding station | Former services | Following station |
|---|---|---|
| Widden towards Gulgong | Sandy Hollow–Gulgong Line | Sandy Hollow Terminus |
