= Baerami Creek =

Baerami Creek Left Branch of Baerami Creek (portion)

Location
- Country: Australia
- State: New South Wales
- Region: NSW North Coast (IBRA), Hunter
- Local government area: Muswellbrook
- Town: Baerami

Physical characteristics
- Source: James Range, Great Dividing Range
  - location: near Mount Monundulla
  - elevation: 495 m (1,624 ft)
- Mouth: Goulburn River
  - location: near Baerami
  - coordinates: 32°23′S 150°28′E
  - elevation: 134 m (440 ft)
- Length: 39 km (24 mi)

Basin features
- River system: Hunter River catchment
- Tributaries
  - left: Wilpin Creek, Reubens Creek
  - right: Hungerford Creek

Baerami Creek, a partly perennial stream of the Hunter River catchment, is located in the Hunter region of New South Wales, Australia.

== Course ==
The Baerami Creek rises on the northern slopes of the James Range, on the eastern slopes of the Great Dividing Range, about 7 kilometres (4.3 mi) north northeast of Mount Monundulla. The river flows generally north by west, joined by four minor tributaries, before reaching its confluence with the Goulburn River near the village of Baerami. The river descends 361 metres (1,184 ft) over its 39 metres (128 ft) course.

== See also ==
- List of rivers of Australia
- List of rivers of New South Wales (A-K)
- Rivers of New South Wales
