= Golden Highway =

Highway in New South Wales

Golden Highway Mitchells Line of Road New South Wales
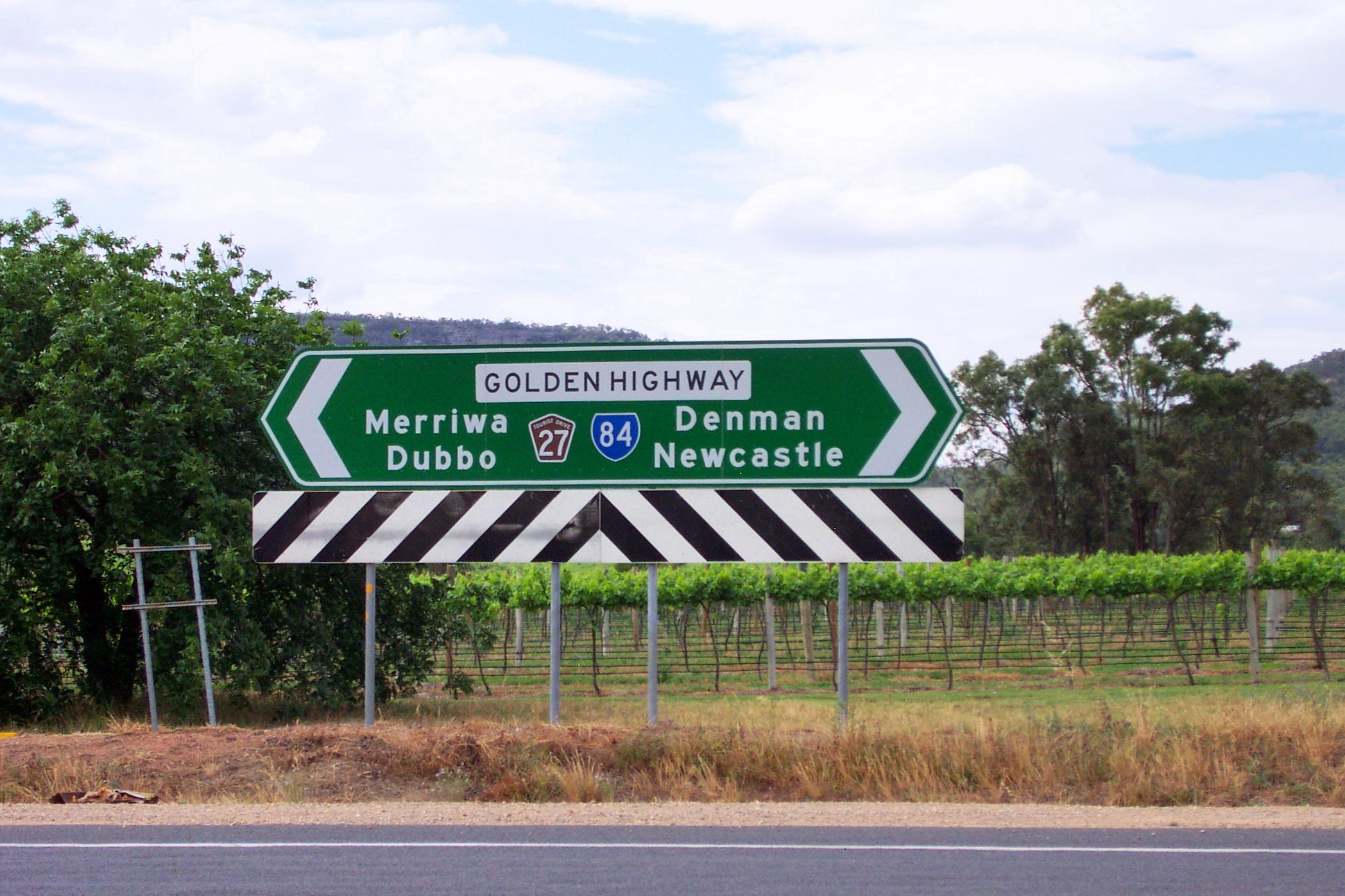
- Direction sign at end of Bylong Valley Way
- Coordinates: 32.642651°S 151.233690°E (East end); 32.243773°S 148.609401°E (West end)

General information
- Type: Highway
- Length: 313 km (194 mi)
- Gazetted: August 1928 (as Main Road 62); November 1996 (as State Highway 27)
- Route number(s): B84 (2013–present) Entire route; Concurrency: B55 (2013–present) (Dunedoo–Leadville)
- Former route number: State Route 84 (1974–2013)

Major junctions
- East end: New England Highway; Whittingham, New South Wales
- Putty Road; Bylong Valley Way; Castlereagh Highway
- West end: Newell Highway; Dubbo, New South Wales

Location(s)
- Major settlements: Denman, Sandy Hollow, Merriwa, Dunedoo

Highway system
- Highways in Australia; National Highway • Freeways in Australia; Highways in New South Wales

Golden Highway (also known as Mitchells Line of Road at its eastern end) is a 313-kilometre (194 mi) highway, located in the Hunter and Orana regions of New South Wales, Australia. It runs eastwards from Dubbo towards Newcastle on the coast, allowing road transport to avoid travelling over the Blue Mountains to Sydney, and is designated route B84.

== Route ==
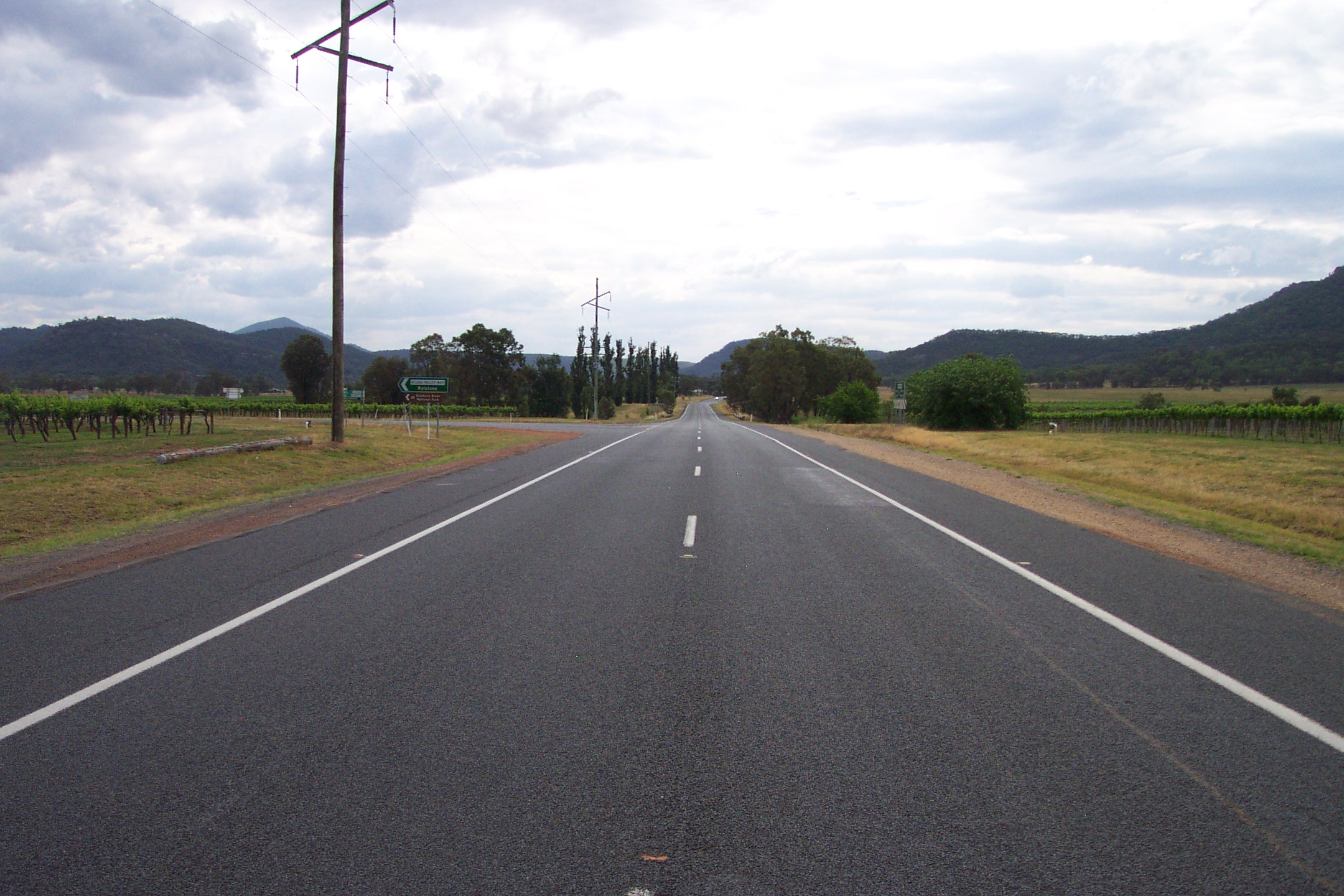
Turnoff at Sandy Hollow towards Bylong Valley Way.

Golden Highway commences at the intersection with Newell Highway in Dubbo and heads in an easterly direction as a four-lane, single-carriageway road, narrowing to two lanes through Dubbo's eastern suburbs, and continues through Dunedoo – where it is concurrent with Castlereagh Highway for approximately 10 kilometres (6.2 mi) – then through Merriwa, Sandy Hollow, Denman, Jerrys Plains and Mount Thorley, where it eventually terminates at the intersection with New England Highway at Whittingham, south of Singleton. Bylong Valley Way turns off Golden Highway 1 kilometre (0.62 mi) east of Sandy Hollow. Golden Highway and Putty Road are concurrent for around 2 kilometres (1.2 mi), east of the Mount Thorley industrial estate near Singleton. The highway then turns east onto Mitchells Line of Road while Putty Road continues to Singleton.

Golden Highway provides a fairly low altitude crossing of the Great Dividing Range. It runs through the Hunter Region and gives access to the golden west of New South Wales.

== History ==
The passing of the Main Roads Act of 1924 through the Parliament of New South Wales provided for the declaration of Main Roads, roads partially funded by the State government through the Main Roads Board (later Transport for NSW). Main Road No. 62 was declared from the intersection with Great Northern Highway (today New England Highway) at Scone, via Merriwa and Cassilis to the intersection with Craboon-Mullaley Road at Coolah, Main Road No. 206 was declared from the intersection of North-Western Highway (today Mitchell Highway) in Dubbo, via Ballimore to Dunedoo, Main Road No. 209 was declared from Muswellbrook, via Denman to Merriwa, and Main Road No. 213 was declared from Mount Thorley, via Jerrys Plains to Denman, on the same day, 8 August 1928. With the passing of the Main Roads (Amendment) Act of 1929 to provide for additional declarations of State Highways and Trunk Roads, this was amended to Trunk Road 62 and Main Roads 206 and 209 and 213 on 8 April 1929.

The Department of Main Roads, which had succeeded the New South Wales MRB in 1932, re-routed the western end of Trunk Road 62 from Coolah to terminate at the intersection of Trunk Road 55 (later Castlereagh Highway) in Craboon (8km east of Dunedoo) on 29 June 1977; the former alignment between Cassilis and Coolah was re-declared as Main Road 618.

The passing of the Roads Act of 1993 through the Parliament of New South Wales updated road classifications and the way they could be declared within New South Wales. Under this act, Golden Highway was declared as State Highway 27 on 22 November 1996, from the intersection with New England Highway at Minimbah east of Whittingham via Mount Thorley, Jerrys Plains, Denman, Merriwa, Cassilis and Dunedoo to the intersection with Newell Highway in Dubbo, subsuming Main Roads 206 and 213; The highway today, as Highway 27, still retains this declaration.

State Route 84 was signed across Main Road 206, Trunk Road 62, and Main Road 213 - from Dubbo via Dunedoo, Cassilis, Merriwa and Denman to Muswellbrook - in 1974; when Golden Highway was declared in 1996, the eastern end of State Route 84 was altered to follow it and terminate at Belford. With the conversion to the newer alphanumeric system in 2013, this was replaced with route B84.

== Major junctions ==
LGA	Location	km	mi	Destinations	Notes
Singleton	Whittingham	0.0	0.0	New England Highway (M15 east, A15 northwest) – Kurri Kurri, Newcastle, Singleton, Tamworth	Eastern terminus of Golden Highway and route B84; Eastern end of Mitchells Line of Road
Singleton	Mount Thorley	10.0	6.2	Putty Road (east) – Singleton	Eastern terminus of concurrency with Putty Road at T intersection Western end of Mitchells Line of Road
Singleton	Mount Thorley	13.4	8.3	Putty Road (west) – Putty, Windsor; Mount Thorley Road (south) – Mount Thorley	Western terminus of concurrency with Putty Road at hybrid interchange
Singleton	Warkworth	23.4	14.5	Wallaby Scrub Road – Bulga, to Putty Road	
Hunter River		46.7	29.0	Bridge over the river (Bowmans Crossing)	
Muswellbrook	Denman	64.5	40.1	Denman Road – Muswellbrook	T intersection
Hunter River		65.3	40.6	Bridge over the river (bridge name unknown)	
Muswellbrook	Sandy Hollow	82.6	51.3	Bylong Valley Way – Bylong, Mudgee	
Muswellbrook	Sandy Hollow	83.0	51.6	Wybong Road – Muswellbrook	
Upper Hunter	Merriwa	119	74	Scone Road – Scone	
Merriwa River		120	75	Bridge over the river (bridge name unknown)	
Krui River		144	89	Bridge over the river (Collaroy Bridge)	
Warrumbungle	Leadville	215	134	Castlereagh Highway (B55 east) – Gulgong, Mudgee, Lithgow	Concurrency with route B55
Warrumbungle	Dunedoo	225	140	Castlereagh Highway (B55 west) – Gilgandra	Concurrency with route B55
Dubbo	Dubbo	313	194	Newell Highway (A39) – Coonabarabran, Parkes, Melbourne, Brisbane	Western terminus of Golden Highway and route B84 at T intersection
1.000 mi = 1.609 km; 1.000 km = 0.621 mi: Concurrency terminus; Route transition

== See also ==
- Highways in Australia
- List of highways in New South Wales
