= Wattle Flat, New South Wales =

Wattle Flat New South Wales
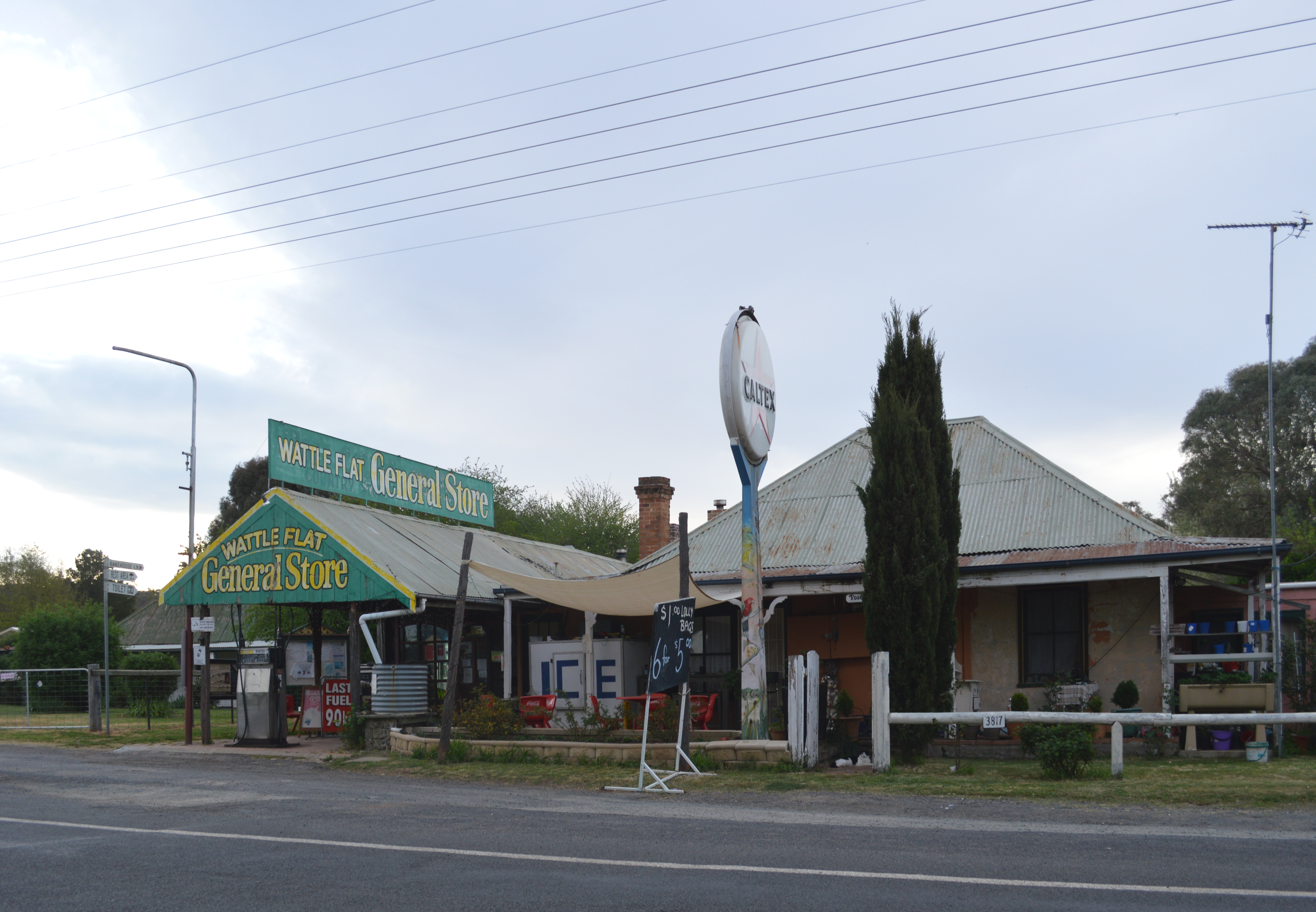
- General store at Wattle Flat (2015)

- Coordinates: 33°08′00″S 149°41′30″E
- Population: 270 (2021 census)
- Postcode(s): 2795
- LGA(s): Bathurst Region
- County: Roxburgh
- Parish: Wiagdon
- State electorate(s): Bathurst
- Federal division(s): Calare

Wattle Flat is a locality in the Bathurst Region of New South Wales, Australia. It had a population of 257 people as of the 2016 census. There is a small village of the same name, near the confluence of Big Oaky Creek and its tributary Solitary Creek.

The area now known as Wattle Flat is on the traditional land of Wiradjuri people.

Gold was discovered around Wattle Flat in 1851. The area had both alluvial and quartz reef gold mining. The area known as Red Bank, 3.2 km south of Wattle Flat, had rich alluvial workings. Significant gold mining activities continued in the area up until around the years of the First World War. There was minor revival when unemployed people sought gold in the area during the Great Depression. The longest-lived of the reef mines, the Big Oaky Mine operated between 1877 and 1937.

It is said that, at the peak of the gold boom, the area had a population of 20,000 and Wattle Flat had ten hotels, four large stores and several smaller ones. By 1932, the population had fallen to around 400. The last of the hotels, the Royal Hotel, was destroyed by fire in 1931 and was not rebuilt.

There has been a public school at Wattle Flat since 1858. From 1876 to until 1958, there was also a convent school—St. Joseph's—run by the Sisters of St. Joseph. Wattle Flat has Anglican, Catholic, and Uniting church buildings. The Anglican church is now a private residence. There are separate Anglican, Catholic, and Uniting Church cemeteries, each of which is adjacent to the associated church. On Limekilns Road, there is also a general cemetery that was dedicated in 1884, but little used.

Wattle Flat has a general store that also has a post office agency,

The Wattle Flat Heritage Lands—the former common, consisting of two areas; one just to the north and one just to the south of the village—is set aside for environmental protection and public recreation (bush walking). it is administered by a trust. The village has a nine-hole golf course, located within the land of its racecourse. The racecourse land was dedicated in 1899. From 1983 to 2019, the Wattle Flat Progress Association hosted a bush race meeting called the "Bronze Thong Festival". The village also has a tennis court and recreation hall.
