= Sandy Hollow, New South Wales =

Town in New South Wales, Australia

Coordinates: 32°20′S 150°34′E

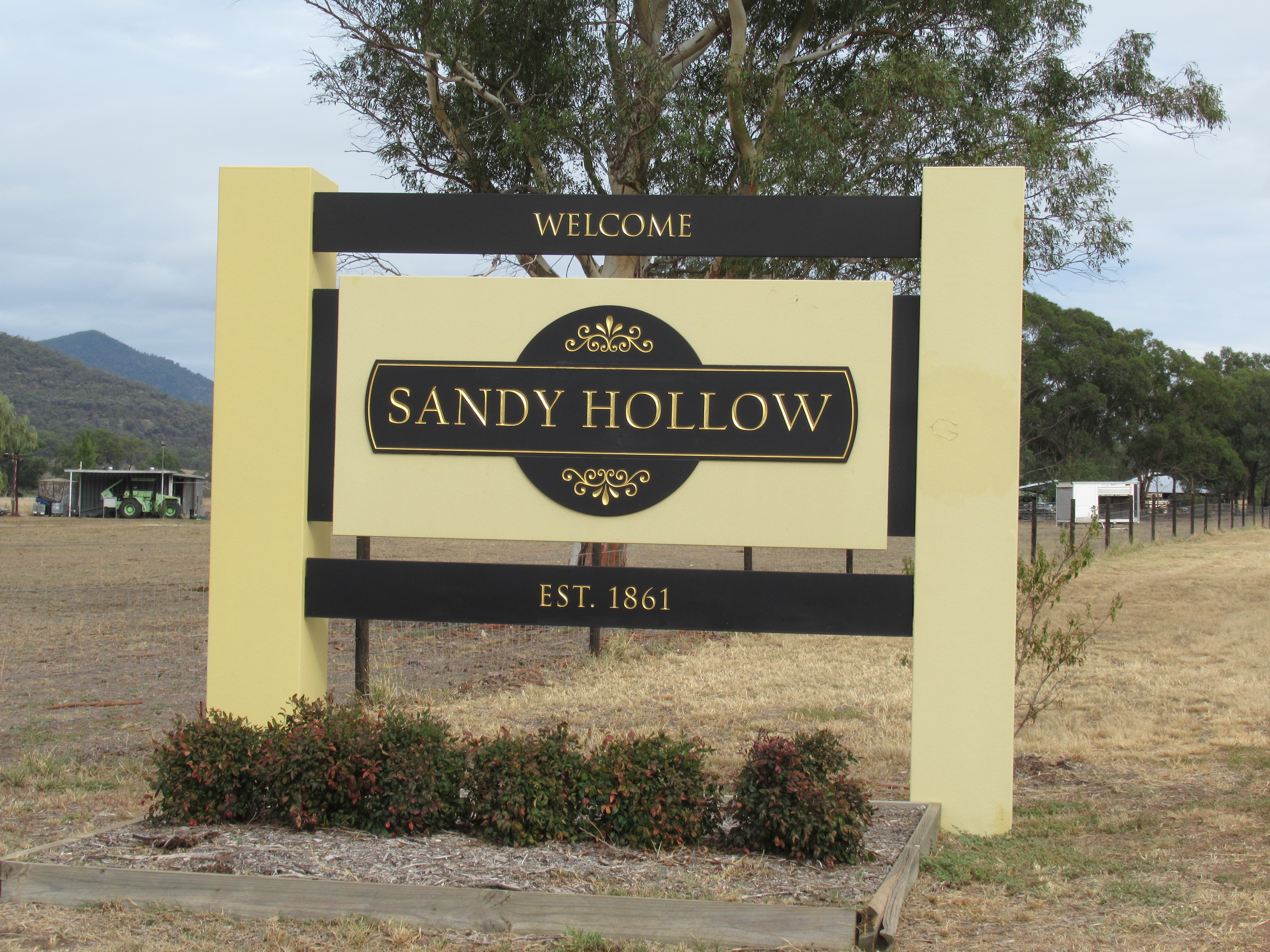
Entrance sign for the town of Sandy Hollow

Sandy Hollow is a small rural town in New South Wales, Australia in Muswellbrook Shire. The town is located on the Golden Highway in the far west of the Upper Hunter Valley, about 260 km north of Sydney.

It is located around halfway between Denman and Merriwa, 1 km west of the intersection of the Golden Highway and the Bylong Valley Way. It is the junction point of the Merriwa and Sandy Hollow-Ulan railway lines, and a railway station was open between 1917 and 1973. Services currently provided include a hotel, caravan park with pool, a service station and combined post office agency which sells eat-in and takeaway meals. It also has a community hall, a small public school, a sculpture-surrounded coffee house and an emporium selling giftware. It is situated close to the Goulburn River and the nearby Giants Creek flows close to the town.

== History ==
The town began as a travellers' campsite on the junction of the Goulburn River Valley and Halls Creek. A route for a railway line between Maryvale and Sandy Hollow was surveyed in 1918. Work began in 1941, stopped during WWII, resumed in 1946 but was ceased in 1950. A coal mine was opened in Ulan in 1977; work was completed on a line to transport coal to Newcastle in 1982.

Oil bearing shale was trucked from a mine at Baerami Creek to refining retorts at Sandy Hollow in the 1940s but was closed after WWII as uneconomical.

== Notable people ==
- Stephen Gageler AC – High Court justice since 2012, Chief Justice of the High Court since 2023.

Preceding station	Former services	Following station
Gungal towards Merriwa	Merriwa Line	Myambat towards Muswellbrook
Baerami towards Gulgong	Sandy Hollow–Gulgong Line	Terminus
