= Denman, New South Wales =

Denman
- Town
- Coordinates: 32°23′S 150°41′E
- Country: Australia
- State: New South Wales
- LGA: Muswellbrook Shire
- Location: 255 km (158 mi) NW of Sydney; 139 km (86 mi) WNW of Newcastle; 73 km (45 mi) NW of Singleton; 28 km (17 mi) SW of Muswellbrook; 54 km (34 mi) SE of Merriwa

Government
  - State electorate: Upper Hunter
  - Federal division: New England
- Elevation: 107 m (351 ft)

Population
  - Total: 1,547 (UCL 2021)
- Postcode: 2328

Denman is a small town in New South Wales, Australia, in Muswellbrook Shire. It is on the Golden Highway in the Upper Hunter Region, about 250 kilometres (160 mi) north of Sydney. At the 2021 census, Denman had a population of 1,547.

== Description ==
Denman is situated on the Hunter River near the Wollemi National Park. The main rural industries in the region are wine grape growing, horse breeding and farming.

Denman is also near Mount Rombo, a hill that has an unusual geometric shape causing to look like it has a perfectly flat top if it is viewed from Mangoola Road, a road that branches off the Golden Highway

About 20 kilometres (12 mi) north-west of Denman, in the Goulburn River National Park, is Mount Dangar, with an elevation of 670 metres (2,200 ft) AHD. It was sighted in 1824 by surveyor Henry Dangar, who named it Mount Cupola (for its domed shape). It was renamed by explorer Allan Cunningham, who became the first European to climb it the following year. Mount Dangar is a good place for walks, offering exceptional views of the area.

Defence Establishment Myambat, the Australian Defence Force's largest munitions storage facility, is located around 10 kilometres west of Denman.

== Heritage listings ==
Denman has a number of heritage-listed sites, including:

- 4883 Jerrys Plains Road: Merton

== Transport ==
Osborn’s Buses runs route 415 from Muswellbrook to Denman on weekdays. There are approximately 15 services per week in each direction.

== Population ==
According to the 2021 Census, there were 1,547 people in Denman.

- Aboriginal and Torres Strait Islander people made up 6.7% of the population.
- 88.7% of people were born in Australia; the next most common countries of birth included England 1.6%, New Zealand 1.3%, the Netherlands 0.5%, Germany 0.3%, and Thailand 0.3%. 92.6% of people spoke only English at home; the next most common languages spoken at home included German 0.3%, Italian 0.2%, and Cantonese 0.2%.
- The most common responses for religion included Anglican 34.4%, No Religion 27.7%, Catholic 23.4%, and Uniting Church 2.3%; a further 6.5% of respondents for this area elected not to disclose their religious status.

=== Notable people ===
- Rylan Gray, racing driver.
