= Turon =

Turon may refer to:

- Turon, Kansas, a town in the United States
- Turón, a town in Granada, Spain
- Turón (Mieres), a parish in Mieres, Spain
- Turon (food), a Filipino dessert made of banana and jackfruit, wrapped in an eggroll wrapper, and then fried
- The Turon River in Australia
- Turon National Park in Australia
- Turoń, a festive monstrosity from Polish folklore
- FC Turon, an association football club based in Yaypan, Uzbekistan, from an alternative spelling of Turan
- Former European name of Da Nang, a port city in Vietnam

== See also ==
- Touron, a derogatory combination of "tourist" and "moron"
- Turrón, a southern European nougat confection
