= Crudine River =

Coordinates: 33°00′00″S 149°38′30″E

Crudine River Crudine Creek, Cunninghams Creek

Location
- Country: Australia
- State: New South Wales
- Region: South Eastern Highlands (IBRA), Central West
- Municipality: Bathurst

Physical characteristics
- Source: Capertee Valley
  - location: near Ilford
  - elevation: 786 m (2,579 ft)
- Mouth: confluence with the Turon River
  - location: near Sofala
  - elevation: 563 m (1,847 ft)
- Length: 54 km (34 mi)

Basin features
- River system: Macquarie River, Murray–Darling basin

Crudine River, a watercourse that is part of the Macquarie catchment within the Murray–Darling basin, is located in the central western district of New South Wales, Australia.

The Crudine River rises on the western slopes of the Great Dividing Range in the Capertee Valley, north of Ilford, and flows generally to the north-north–west, west, and then south-south–west, before forming its confluence with the Turon River west of Sofala; dropping 223 metres (732 ft) over the course of its 54-kilometre (34 mi) length.

== See also ==
- Rivers of New South Wales
- List of rivers of Australia
