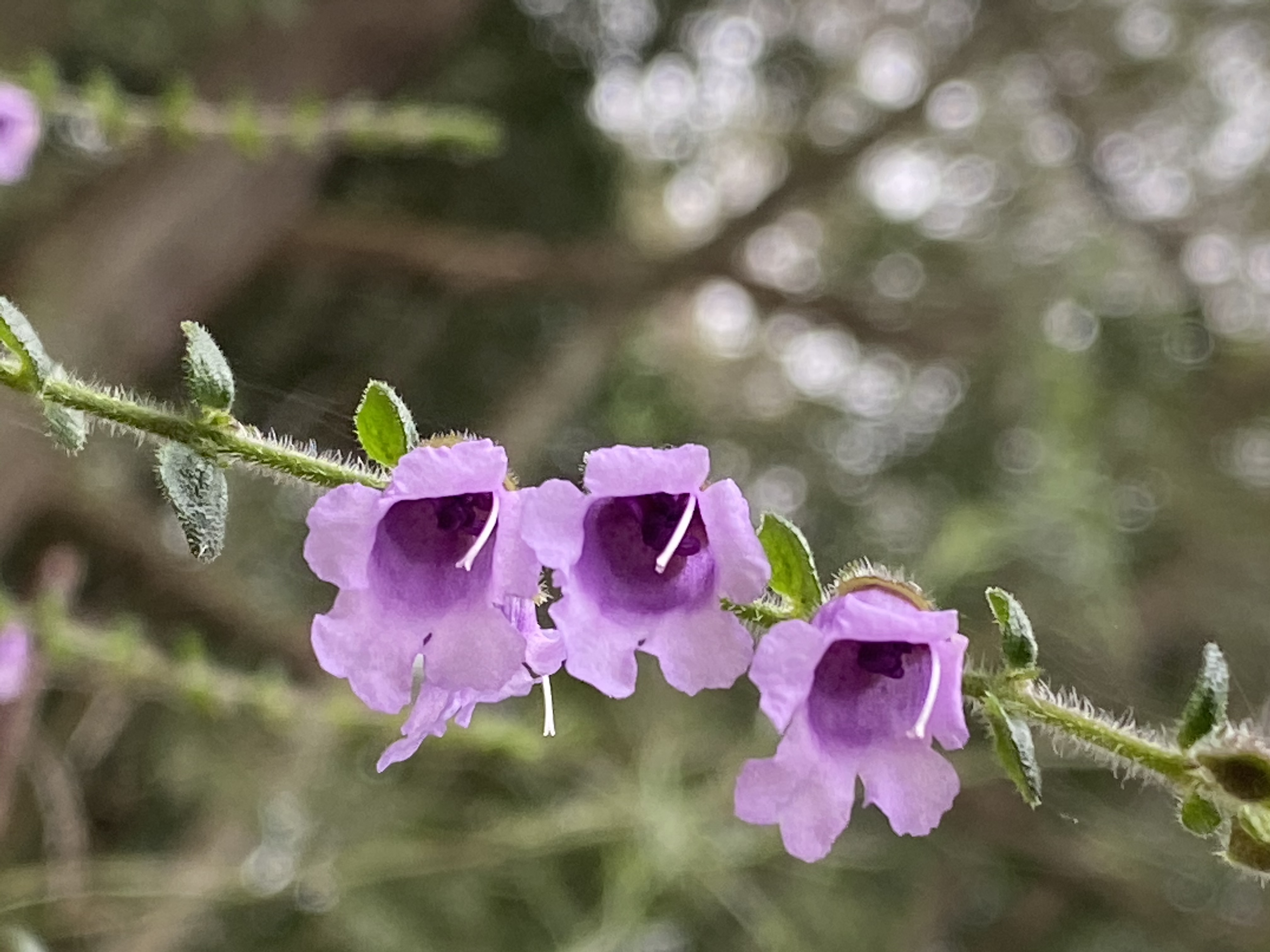
- In Hunter Region Botanic Gardens

Conservation status
- Vulnerable (EPBC Act)

Scientific classification
- Kingdom: Plantae
- Clade: Tracheophytes
- Clade: Angiosperms
- Clade: Eudicots
- Clade: Asterids
- Order: Lamiales
- Family: Lamiaceae
- Genus: Prostanthera
- Species: P. stricta

Binomial name
- Prostanthera stricta R.T.Baker
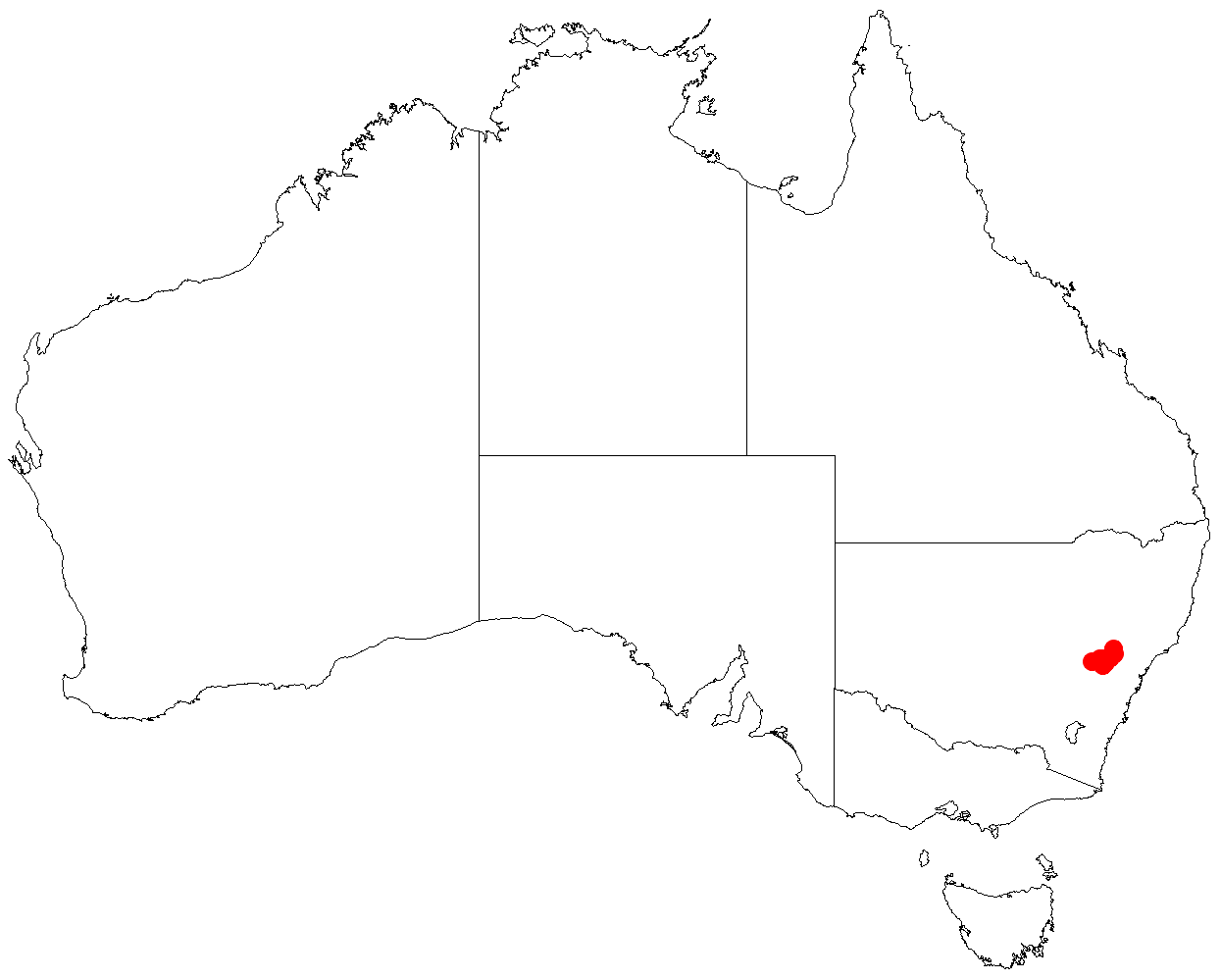
- Occurrence data from AVH

= Prostanthera stricta =

Mount Vincent mint bush

Species of flowering plant

Prostanthera stricta, commonly known as Mount Vincent mint bush, is a species of flowering plant in the family Lamiaceae and is endemic to a small area of New South Wales. It is an bushy, erect, spreading shrub with egg-shaped leaves and mauve flowers with darker spots inside.

== Description ==
Prostanthera stricta is a bushy, erect, aromatic, spreading shrub that typically grows to 2 m (6 ft 7 in) high and 3 m (9.8 ft) wide with densely hairy branches. The leaves are mid-green, densely hairy, egg-shaped, 8–13 mm (0.31–0.51 in) long and 5–9 mm (0.20–0.35 in) wide on a petiole about 1 mm (0.039 in) long. The flowers are arranged in groups at the ends of branchlets with bracteoles about 3–3.5 mm (0.12–0.14 in) long at the base. The sepals are 4–4.5 mm (0.16–0.18 in) long and form a tube about 2 mm (0.079 in) long with two lobes, the upper lobe about 2 mm (0.079 in) long. The petals are 6–9 mm (0.24–0.35 in) long and pale mauve to deep purple-mauve with darker dots inside the petal tube. Flowering occurs from winter to spring.

== Taxonomy and naming ==
Prostanthera stricta was first formally described in 1896 by Richard Thomas Baker in Proceedings of the Linnean Society of New South Wales from specimens collected near Ilford.

== Distribution and habitat ==
This mint bush grows in forest in forest in sandy soil near watercourse on the Central Tablelands and nearby Central West Slopes of New South Wales.

== Conservation status ==
This mintbush is listed as "vulnerable" under the Australian Government Environment Protection and Biodiversity Conservation Act 1999 and the New South Wales Government Biodiversity Conservation Act 2016. The main threats to the species include land clearing, grazing and trampling, and weed invasion.
