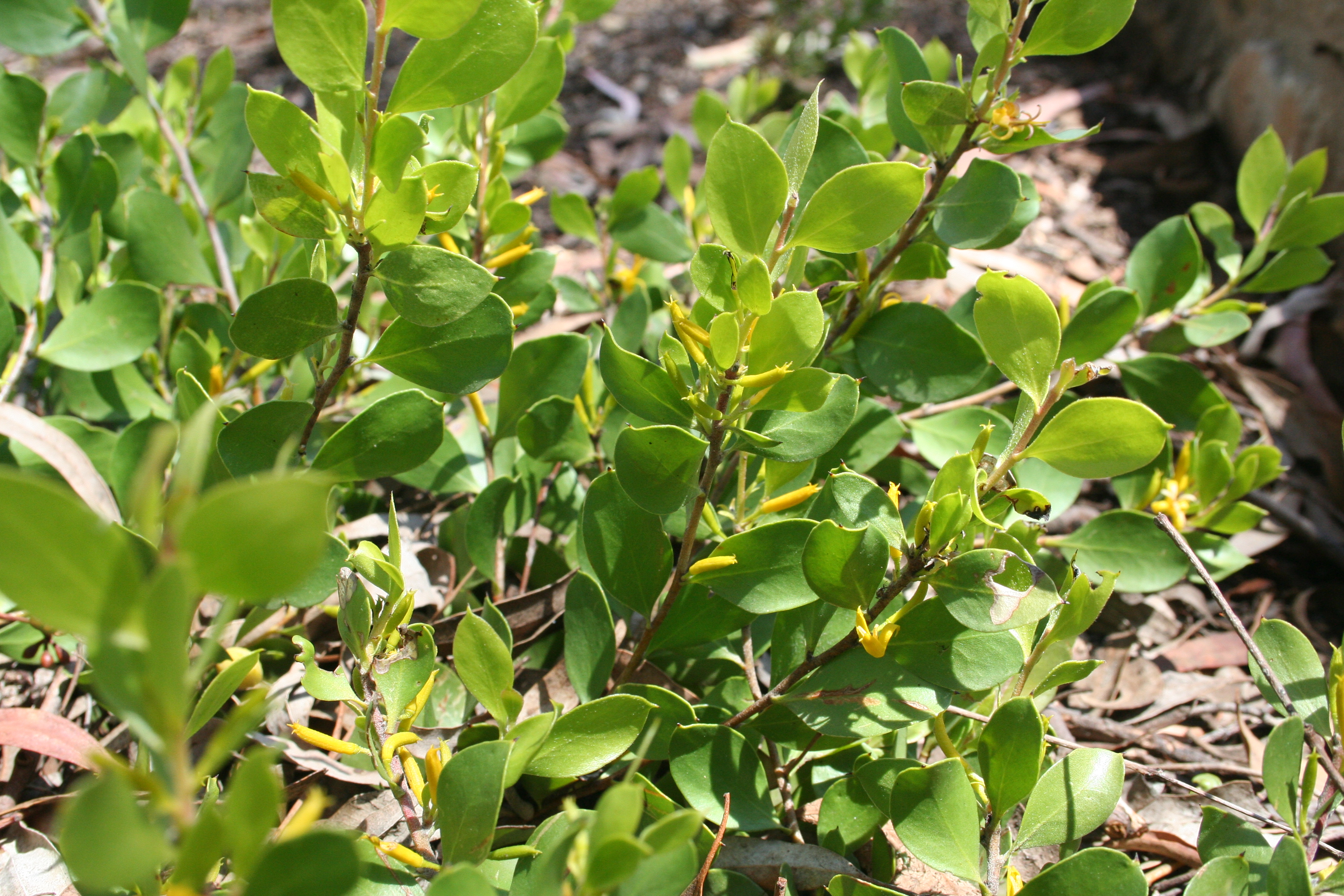
- Persoonia marginata in the ANBG

Conservation status
- Vulnerable (EPBC Act)

Scientific classification
- Kingdom: Plantae
- Clade: Tracheophytes
- Clade: Angiosperms
- Clade: Eudicots
- Order: Proteales
- Family: Proteaceae
- Genus: Persoonia
- Species: P. marginata

Binomial name
- Persoonia marginata A.Cunn. ex R.Br.

= Persoonia marginata =

Clandulla geebung

Species of flowering plant

Persoonia marginata, commonly known as the Clandulla geebung, is a plant in the family Proteaceae and is endemic to New South Wales, Australia. It is a low, spreading shrub with elliptic to egg-shaped leaves and small groups of cylindrical yellow flowers.

== Description ==
Persoonia marginata is a low, spreading shrub which grows to a height of 0.5 m (2 ft) and a width of 1 m (3 ft). Its young branches and leaves are moderately hairy but become glabrous with age. The leaves are arranged alternately and are elliptic to egg-shaped with the narrower end towards the base. They are 20–40 mm (0.8–2 in) long, 6–23 mm (0.2–0.9 in) wide and both surfaces are the same colour. The flowers are arranged in groups of between two and four mostly at the base of leaves. The groups have a stalk up to 6 mm (0.2 in) long, each flower with a moderately hairy pedicel which is 2–7 mm (0.08–0.3 in) long. The flower is composed of four yellow, slightly hairy tepals which are 8–12 mm (0.3–0.5 in) long, which are fused at the base but with the tips rolled back. The central style is surrounded by four yellow anthers which are also joined at the base with the tips rolled back, so that it resembles a cross when viewed end-on. The ovary is densely covered with grey hairs. Flowering occurs in January and February and is followed by fruit which are smooth green drupes.

== Taxonomy and naming ==
Persoonia marginata was first formally described in 1830 by Robert Brown from an unpublished description by Allan Cunningham. Brown's description was published in Supplementum primum Prodromi florae Novae Hollandiae. The specific epithet (marginata) is a Latin word meaning "furnished with a border".

== Distribution and habitat ==
This persoonia grows in woodland and forest on sandy soils derived from sandstone. It is found on the Central Tablelands and Central Coast but is most common in the Clandulla State Forest near Kandos. Small, isolated populations occur in other state forests and national parks including Turon National Park and Gardens of Stone National Park.

== Conservation ==
Populations of Clandulla geebung are under threat from habitat loss and degradation due to forestry activities, road construction and recreational activities. They are also threatened by frequent fires, weed invasion and fungal diseases. The species is listed as "Vulnerable" under the Commonwealth Government Environment Protection and Biodiversity Conservation Act 1999 (EPBC) Act and the New South Wales Biodiversity Conservation Act 2016.
