= ASNSW =

ASNSW may refer to:

- Ambulance Service of New South Wales
- Astronomical Society of New South Wales
