= Wallaby Rocks Bridge =

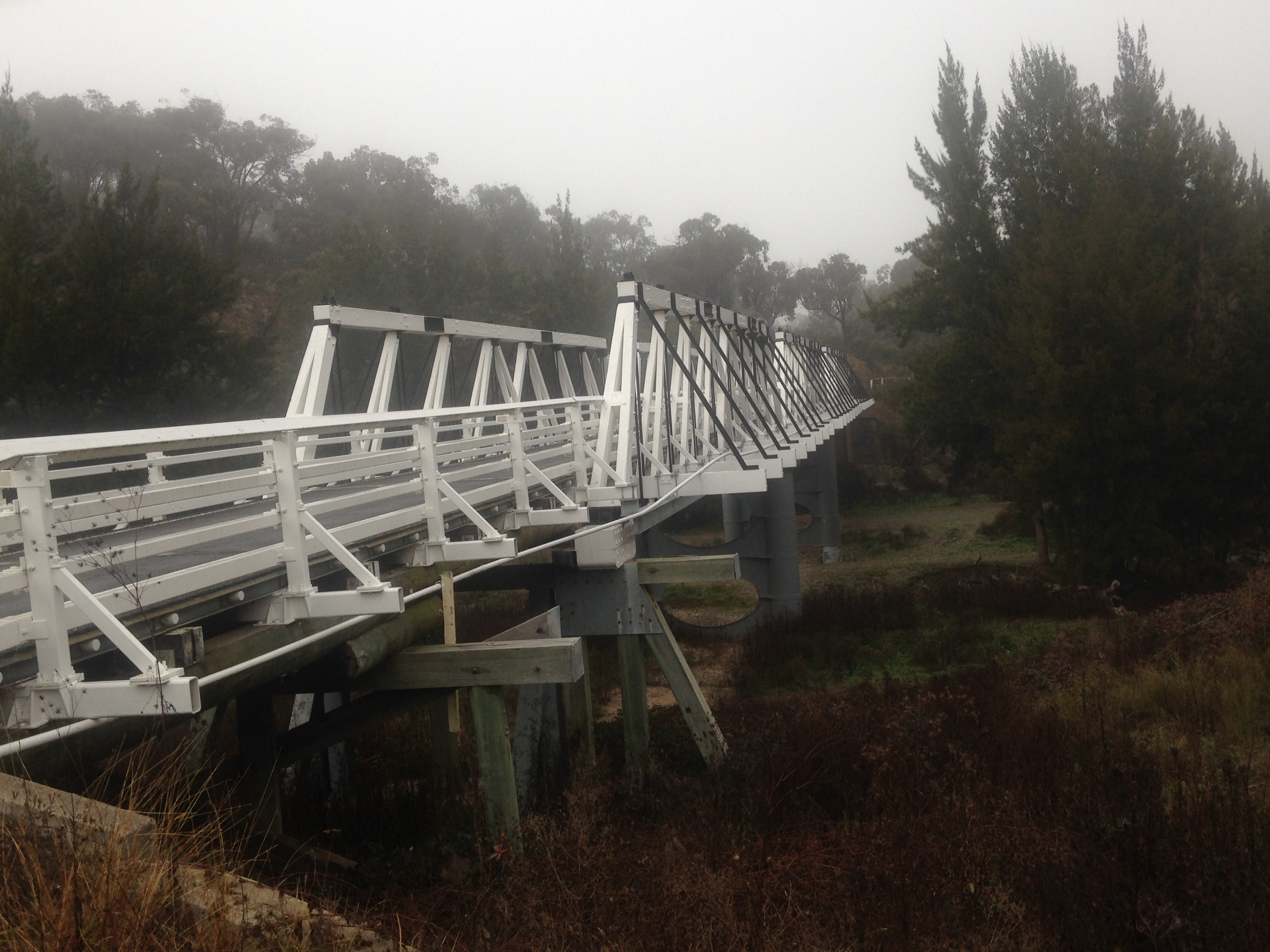
- Wallaby Rocks Bridge in 2019
- Coordinates: 33°04′25″S 149°38′59″E
- Carries: Hill End Road: Motor vehicles only
- Crosses: Turon River
- Locale: Wallaby Rocks near Sofala, New South Wales, Australia
- Other name(s): Turon River Bridge; Turon River bridge, Wallaby Rocks
- Owner: Transport for NSW

Characteristics
- Design: Allan truss
- Material: Timber
- Pier construction: Wrought iron cylinders
- Total length: 91 metres (300 ft)
- Width: 15 feet (5 m)
- Longest span: 3× 27 metres (90 ft); 2x 8 metres (25 ft)
- No. of spans: 4: 1 + 2 main + 1
- Piers in water: 2
- No. of lanes: One

History
- Designer: Percy Allan
- Constructed by: Messrs. Taylor and Murphy
- Fabrication by: Mort's Dock & Engineering Company (bridge cylinders)
- Construction start: 1896
- Construction end: 1897
- Construction cost: A£4,700
- Opened: 2 October 1897
- Inaugurated: 20 October 1897

New South Wales Heritage Register
- Official name: Bridge over Turon River at Wallaby Rocks
- Type: State heritage (built)
- Designated: 20 June 2000
- Reference no.: 1458
- Type: Road Bridge
- Category: Transport – Land
- Builders: E. Taylor, Balmain

The Wallaby Rocks Bridge is a heritage-listed road bridge that carries Hill End Road across the Turon River, at Wallaby Rocks near Sofala, New South Wales, Australia. It was designed by Percy Allan and built in 1897 by E. Taylor of Balmain. The bridge is owned by Transport for NSW. It was added to the New South Wales State Heritage Register on 20 June 2000.

== History ==
Timber truss road bridges have played a significant role in expanding and improving the New South Wales road network. Before the bridges were built, river crossings were often dangerous in times of rain, which caused bulk freight movement to be prohibitively expensive for most agricultural and mining produce. Only the high-priced wool clip of the time could carry the costs and inconvenience imposed by the generally inadequate river crossings that often existed before the truss bridge's construction.

Timber truss bridges were preferred by the NSW Public Works Department from the mid 19th to the early 20th century because they were relatively cheap to construct, and used mostly local materials. The financially troubled governments of the day applied pressure to the Public Works Department to produce as much road and bridge work for as little cost as possible, using local materials. This condition effectively prohibited use of iron and steel, which had to be imported from England, until the steel works at Newcastle opened in the early 20th century.

Allan trusses were the first truly scientifically engineered timber truss bridges, and incorporate American design ideas for the first time. This is a reflection of the changing mindset of the NSW people, who were slowly accepting that American ideas could be as good as or better than European ones. The high quality and low cost of the Allan truss design entrenched the dominance of timber truss bridges for NSW roads for the next 30 years.

Percy Allan, the designer of Allan truss and other bridges, was a senior engineer of the Public Works Department, and a prominent figure in late 19th century NSW. Timber truss bridges, and timber bridges generally were so common that NSW was known to travellers as the "timber bridge state".

Opened in October 1897 and built by Messrs. Taylor and Murphy of Balmain, the bridge is maintained by the Transport for NSW.

== Description ==
The Wallaby Rocks Bridge is an Allan-type timber truss road bridge. It has three timber truss spans, each of 27.7 metres (91 ft). There are two approach spans at one end and one at the other giving the bridge an overall length of 91 metres (300 ft). The timber truss spans are supported by painted twin cast iron cylindrical piers. The approach spans are supported by timber trestles. The bridge provides a single lane carriage way with a minimum width of 15 feet (5 m). A post and rail timber guard rail extends the full length of the bridge.

The bridge was reported to be intact and in good condition as at 22 October 1998. The structure is currently carrying more load than it is designed for and, as it is not unique, if it had to be rebuilt it would not be retained. Its design is seen elsewhere as are the iron cylinders supporting it.

== Heritage listing ==
Completed in 1897, the Wallaby Rocks Bridge is amongst the oldest examples of an Allan-type timber truss road bridge, and in 1998 was in good condition. As a timber truss road bridge, it has many associational links with important historical events, trends, and people, including the expansion of the road network and economic activity throughout NSW, and Percy Allan, the designer of this type of truss. Allan trusses were third in the five-stage design evolution of NSW timber truss bridges, and were a major improvement over the McDonald trusses which preceded them. Allan trusses were 20% cheaper to build than McDonald trusses, could carry 50% more load, and were easier to maintain. The bridge has iron piers, which is a rare technical and aesthetic feature, and has the ability to demonstrate much about the manufacturing technology of the late 19th century. In 1998 there were 38 surviving Allan trusses in NSW of the 105 built, and 82 timber truss road bridges survive from the over 400 built. The Turon River bridge is a representative example of Allan timber truss road bridges, and is assessed as being State significant, primarily on the basis of its technical and historical significance.

The Wallaby Rocks Bridge was listed on the New South Wales State Heritage Register on 20 June 2000 having satisfied the following criteria.

The place is important in demonstrating the course, or pattern, of cultural or natural history in New South Wales.

Through the bridge's association with the expansion of the NSW road network, its ability to demonstrate historically important concepts such as the gradual acceptance of NSW people of American design ideas, and its association with Percy Allan, it has historical significance.

The place is important in demonstrating aesthetic characteristics and/or a high degree of creative or technical achievement in New South Wales.

The bridge exhibits the technical excellence of its design, as all of the structural detail is clearly visible. In the context of its landscape it is visually attractive, and the large three main span construction is an imposing presence. As such, the bridge has moderate aesthetic significance.

The place has a strong or special association with a particular community or cultural group in New South Wales for social, cultural or spiritual reasons.

Timber truss bridges are prominent to road travellers, and NSW has in the past been referred to as the "timber truss bridge state". Through this, the complete set of bridges gain some social significance, as they could be said to be held in reasonable esteem by many travellers in NSW. The Turon River Bridge is held in some esteem by the people of Bathurst, and contributes in a small way to the heritage tourism which is popular in the area.

The place possesses uncommon, rare or endangered aspects of the cultural or natural history of New South Wales.

Rare; in 1998 there were 38 surviving Allan trusses in NSW of the 105 built, and 82 timber truss road bridges survive from the over 400 built.

The place is important in demonstrating the principal characteristics of a class of cultural or natural places/environments in New South Wales.

Representative of Allan truss bridges.

== See also ==
- List of road bridges in New South Wales
- List of Allan truss bridges
