= Bowen Mountain, New South Wales =

Bowen Mountain
- Suburb
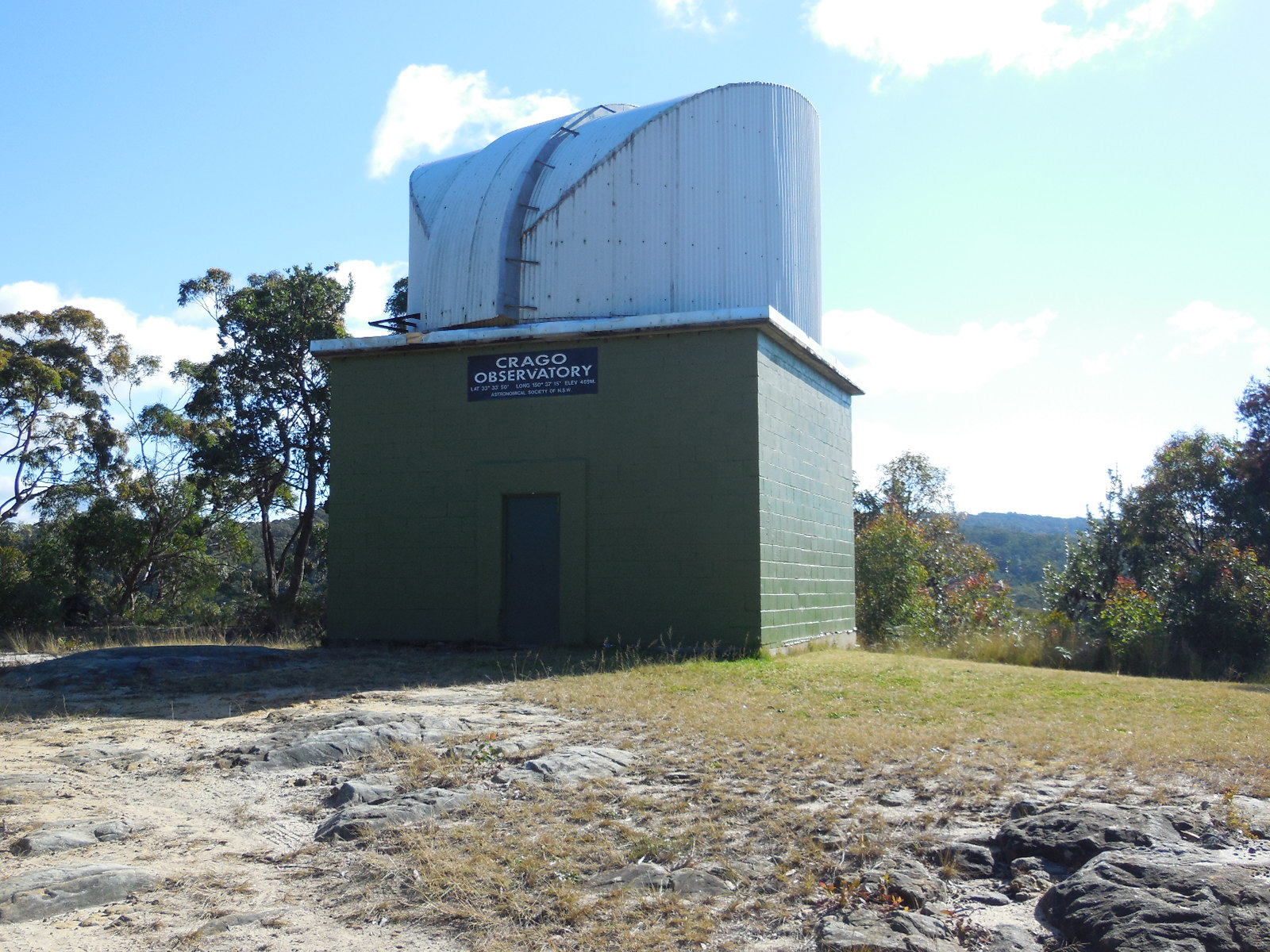
- Crago Observatory, Bowen Mountain

- Coordinates: 33°35′S 150°38′E
- Country: Australia
- State: New South Wales
- LGA: City of Hawkesbury
- Location: 77 km (48 mi) from Sydney CBD

Government
  - State electorate: Londonderry
  - Federal division: Macquarie
- Elevation: 416 m (1,365 ft)

Population
  - Total: 1,571 (2016 census)
- Postcode: 2753
- Mean max temp: 25 °C (77 °F)
- Mean min temp: 3 °C (37 °F)
Suburbs around Bowen Mountain
Blue Mountains NP	Kurrajong Heights	Kurrajong Hills
Blue Mountains NP	Bowen Mountain	Grose Vale
Blue Mountains NP	Blue Mountains NP	Grose Vale

Bowen Mountain is a small town in New South Wales, Australia, in the City of Hawkesbury. It is in the foothills of the Blue Mountains.

The nearest commercial centre is Kurrajong, which lies approximately 5 km to the north-east.

Bowen Mountain is located approximately 77 kilometres northwest of Sydney.

It is named after George M. C. Bowen, an earlier setter of the area.

== Features ==
A large part of Bowen Mountain belongs to the Blue Mountains National Park, which covers an area of 247,000 hectares. The National Park caters extensively for bushwalkers, with many lookouts and more than 140 km of walking tracks.

Bowen Mountain is home to the Crago Observatory, which consists of a computer-guided Dobsonian telescope housed in a large rotating dome. It is operated by the Astronomical Society of NSW. Crago is significant in that it is one of the most accessible observatories to Sydney residents that does not suffer from excessive light pollution compared to Sydney Observatory.

== Demographics ==
At the 2021 census, the population was 1,609. Of these:

- The median age was 35 years, compared to the national median of 38 years.

Age	Number	%
0 to 14	370	23.4
15 to 64	1060	67.7
65+	141	8.9

- 55.6% were married and 11.1% were either divorced or separated.
- 83.6% of people were born in Australia and 91.1% of people only spoke English at home.

Religion	Number	%
No religion	488	31.2
Anglican	339	21.6
Catholic	326	20.8
