= Clandulla, New South Wales =

Clandulla
- Town
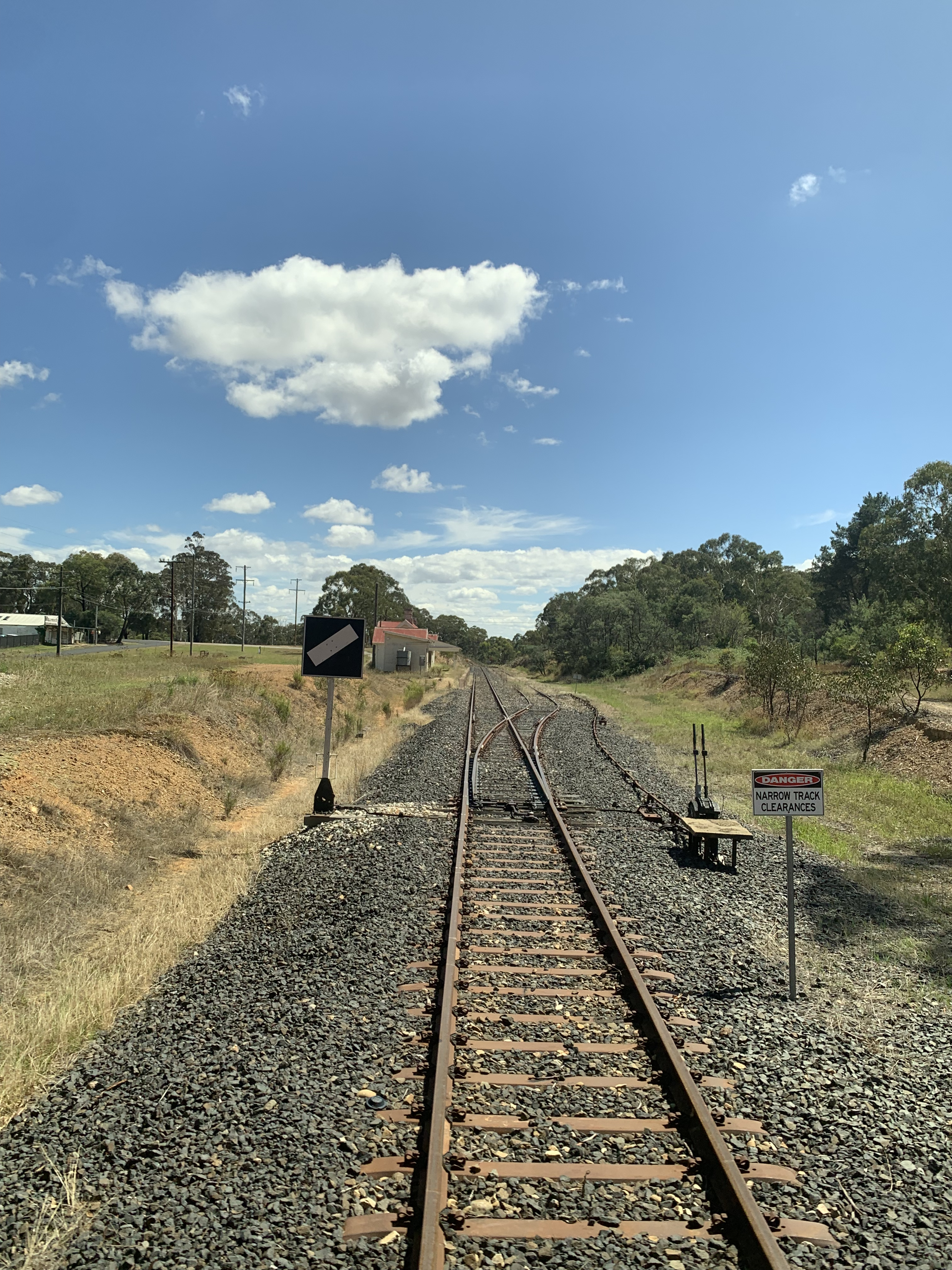
- The Gwabegar railway line through Clandulla, with Clandulla station on the left

- Coordinates: 32°55′1″S 149°57′4″E
- Country: Australia
- State: New South Wales
- LGA: Mid-Western Regional Council

Government
  - State electorate: Bathurst
  - Federal division: Calare
- Elevation: 716 m (2,349 ft)

Population
  - Total: 197 (2016 census)
- Postcode: 2848

Clandulla is a village in New South Wales, Australia, within the Mid-Western Regional Council, about 225 kilometres north-west of Sydney. At the 2016 census Clandulla and the surrounding rural district had a population of 197, living in 61 private dwellings. The township and district also included 22 unoccupied private dwellings. Clandulla is bounded to the west and north by the Clandulla State Forest (with an area of about 1,400 hectares).

The village, which essentially grew around the railway station at the locality, has had several name changes during its history. From about 1884 the settlement was named Calwell (even though the railway station was named Ilford, after the older township in the district eight miles to the south-west on the Sydney Road). By about 1905 both the village and the railway station had been renamed Clandulla.

== History ==
The area now known as Clandulla lies on the traditional lands of the Wiradjuri people.

After settler colonisation the area became the parish of Clandulla within the county of Roxburgh (which had been named by the mid-1860s). The location of present-day Clandulla village lies in the north-west corner of the parish.

In September 1881 William Hawkins was granted a publican's license for the White Horse Hotel located at “Flatlands, Clandulla”. In November 1881 it was reported that it was “proposed to establish” a public school at “Clandulla, near Ilford”.

In June 1884 the railway branch line connecting Capertee to Wallerawang was extended through to Rylstone. The railway extension passed through the site of the present-day village, by-passing the established settlement of Ilford eight miles to the south-east on the Sydney Road. A railway station was built at the location and the railway authorities named it 'Ilford' despite the distance between Ilford village and the new station. The railway station had been constructed by February 1884 when a correspondent made the observation that "the Ilford station house… seems too pretentious for the likely public requirements there".

In October 1885 it was notified that Crown Lands were "declared to be reserved and set apart" as a site for the village at Carwell. The land set aside for Carwell village was in the vicinity of Ilford railway station.

The railway station was named Ilford until 1900, when it was renamed Mornington. Three years later it was briefly renamed Carwell. In May 1905 it was notified that “the Railway Commissioners and the postal authorities” had agreed to change the name of Carwell railway station to Clandulla.

In August 1925 it was reported that "here and there at Clandulla there are evidences of the little village 'kicking its way through the shell'". Additional homes in the village were "springing up in consequence of recent subdivision sales" (which were probably stimulated by the construction of the nearby Charbon cement works).

=== Shale oil ===
When the area was known as Mornington, in 1900-1901, it was the site of a short-lived shale mining and retorting operation, run by the Mornington Proprietary Oil Company. Retorts of a novel 'lead bath' design were erected and a road constructed to their site. Experimental distillation of oil took place, but the 'lead bath' retorts were unsuitable—the low temperature of operation could not recover enough of the valuable ammonia by-product—and the quality of the carbonaceous shale—not torbanite, or 'kerosene shale' as it was then known—at Mornington was too poor to extract its oil content economically, by any available method. The site was abandoned, and the company was in liquidation by mid 1902.

=== Cement works ===
In March 1924, shares in the Standard Portland Cement Company Ltd. were offered for public sale. The company was “formed to establish works for the manufacture of Portland cement” at a location north of Clandulla village “and to acquire from Cement Products Ltd., all rights in limestone leases, freeholds, contracts, etc.”. At the time of the share float the Standard Portland Cement Company reached an agreement with the NSW State government to supply 50 thousand tons of cement annually (at £2 17s. 6d. a ton), with supply to commence two years after the contract was signed. An article published in October 1924 described the development of the cement works being built six kilometres north of Clandulla village (half-way between Clandulla and Kandos). The industrial complex and associated facilities for workers was to be called 'Charbon' (the French word for 'coal'). It was expected “the new works will reach the stage of cement production in about 18 months”. Limestone deposits for the cement-making process were “situated nearby on Carwell Creek”. Over 150 men were employed during the construction phase. The “first train load of cement” was despatched from the Charbon works in January 1927. It was reported that “the railway authorities” were constructing a platform near the Charbon works as Clandulla was considered to be “rather far away” to effectively serve the cement works.

In late 1923, shares in a company called the Clandulla Cement Ltd. were offered for public sale. The company proposed to acquire “certain limestone and coal-bearing lands… at Clandulla and near Watson’s Cutting” (alongside the railway line south of Clandulla) in order “to establish Portland cement works and other enterprises”. In January 1925, with the cement works under construction, Albert Dalwood, the chairman of directors of Clandulla Cement Ltd., stated in an interview that “the situation of the works is a unique one, owing to enormous deposits of all the requisite raw materials, lime stone, shale, coal and water being within half a mile of the factory site, providing exceptional facilities for production at low cost”.

In August 1926, it was reported that the Great Western Cement Company “has taken over the Clandulla Cement Co.’s lands at Clandulla’. The company intended to “open up collieries and quarries, and to manufacture cement”, as well as constructing “a branch line of railway from the collieries”. In June 1929 it was reported that “the proposed new town to be established on the Great Western Cement Company’s property at Clandulla” would be called 'Concrete'. In March 1930 a reader's question about the Great Western Cement Company was published in the Truth newspaper asking whether the company was “a proper going concern”. The published answer stated that although the company was registered in 1926 and “over £150,000 capital” had been subscribed, “it is still in the non-producing stage”. The newspaper added that “it is about time the company got to work in the interests of its shareholders”. The grand plans for a cement works south of Clandulla were eventually abandoned. By the end of 1930 the Great Western Cement Company had applied to lease 30 acres at Bunnerong in south-east Sydney in order to erect “works for the manufacture of carbon dioxide and lime products”.

== Geology ==
Clandulla village sits above the geological formation known as Clandulla Limestone which consists of limestone and dolomite, as well as carbonaceous shale. The Clandulla Limestone formation has a maximum thickness of 170 metres and is part of the extensive Lachlan Orogen (Fold Belt). The Lachlan Fold Belt was formed "by deep-marine sediments with basic volcanics", with sedimentation extending over a vast time period from the Cambrian to the Carboniferous.

== See also ==
- Ilford
- Kandos
- Rylstone
