= Crago Observatory =

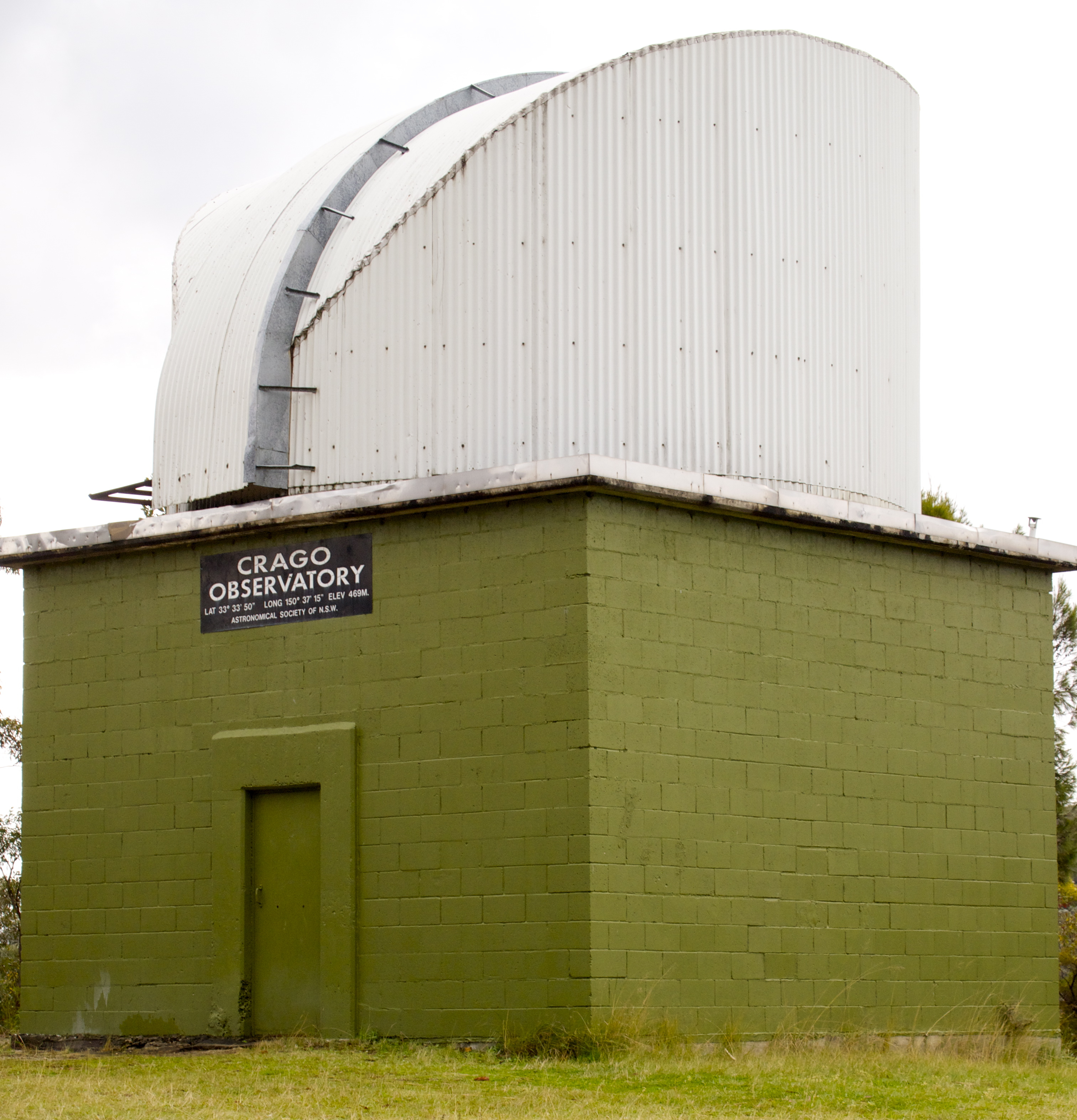
The observatory photographed in 2011.

Crago Observatory is an astronomical observatory operated by the Astronomical Society of New South Wales. It is located at Bowen Mountain, near North Richmond, which is around 75 kilometres (47 mi) from Sydney city.

The observatory has a large rotating dome atop a concrete block building. Until 2020 it housed a 16″ ƒ/7 Dobsonian telescope, fitted with Argo Navis and ServoCAT. Then a combination of storm damage to the observatory and the COVID-19 pandemic forced the observatory to close temporarily. The society decided to take advantage of that extended break to upgrade the telescope, and commissioned the construction of a new 22" f/5 telescope. It is expected to re-open with the new telescope during 2022. There is also a wide range of eyepieces and star charts available for use with the telescope.

Crago is one of the most accessible observatories to Sydney residents that does not suffer from excessive light pollution compared to Sydney Observatory located in the city.

It is named after Marion and Jack Crago, members of the flour-milling Crago family, who were active members of the society. Marion Crago suggested Bowen Mountain as the location for an observatory and, upon her death, had left money to the society.

== Observatory information ==
- Latitude : 33° 33′ 50″ S
- Longitude: 150° 37′ 15″ E
- Altitude : 469m (1560′)
- Telescope: 22″ ƒ/5 Dobsonian

== See also ==
- List of astronomical observatories
- List of astronomical societies
