= Grave of Windradyne =

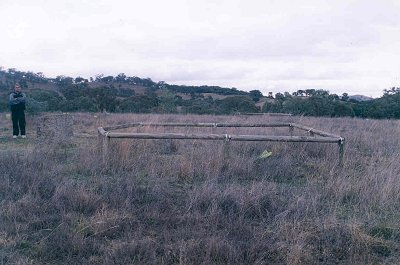
- Grave of Windradyne

- Location within New South Wales Location within Australia
- 33.3271°S 149.6100°E
- Location: Brucedale, 1361 Sofala Road, Sofala, Bathurst Region, New South Wales, Australia

History
- Built: 1835–1835

Site notes
- Architect: Wiradjuri people

New South Wales Heritage Register
- Official name: Grave of Windradyne; Windradyne's Grave
- Type: state heritage (archaeological-terrestrial)
- Designated: 10 March 2006
- Reference no.: 1714
- Type: Burial
- Category: Aboriginal
- Builders: Wiradjuri people

Grave of Windradyne is a heritage-listed grave site at Brucedale, 1361 Sofala Road, Sofala, Bathurst Region, New South Wales, Australia. It was designed and built by Wiradjuri people in 1835. It is also known as Windradyne's Grave. It was added to the New South Wales State Heritage Register on 10 March 2006.

== History ==
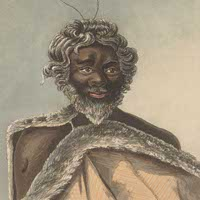
An illustration depicting a Wiradjuri warrior, thought to be Windradyne (c1800 - 1829)

Windradyne was a warrior and a leader of the Wiradjuri near Bathurst. He established the friendly relations with William Suttor, whose father George crossed the Blue Mountains in 1822 and took up land that he named "Brucedale". During the frontier wars Windradyne's family was massacred and he declared war on the settlers. William Suttor learnt the local Wiradjuri dialect, and speaking with Windradyne he was able to defuse the situation at Brucedale homestead. The two men remained friends, and when Windradyne died he was buried on Brucedale. The grave was marked by Bathurst Historical Society in 1955, and continues to be revered by local Wiradjuri, who have recently planted trees around the grave in a traditional diamond pattern.

Windradyne was described as a very handsome, well-proportioned young man. He was dark brown in colour, with thick black curly hair held back by a head band. He wore his long beard plaited into three sections. He was powerfully built, with broad shoulders and muscular arms and legs. Windradyne was a great hunter and a fierce warrior and because of his great fighting ability he was recognised throughout the area as a warrior leader.

The first invader into Wiradjuri country was Evans in November 1813.

The first attack, led by Windradyne occurred early in 1822. The residents of Bathurst were outraged that black men actually attacked stockmen and killed stock. They demand military assistance to protect them from the "wild natives". A party of Redcoats was despatched by Major James Morisset to bring in as many prisoners as possible to "teach these blacks a lesson". Windradyne learnt of the soldier's plans and to stop the murder of many of his people he walked bravely out to meet them before the soldiers reached his camping area. The Redcoats on see Windradyne, quickly pounced on him, but so great was Windradyne's strength that the only way the six soldiers could hold him was to break a musket over his ribs. Windradyne was then chained and taken into Bathurst. The Sydney Gazette quoted Windradynes capture on 8 January 1824. Taken into Bathurst in chains, Windradyne for his exploits was sentenced to a month's imprisonment. White people assigned the name "Saturday" to Windradyne.

For Windradyne, the breaking point came in May 1824 at Kelso. While his family was passing a potato garden on the river flats opposite the settlement, the settler offered them potatoes which they gladly accepted. The following morning whilst passing the same garden they helped themselves to the potatoes, but this time the settler gathered several neighbours and ran towards Windradyne and the others firing their guns. The settlers' attack surprised Windradyne. It had caught him off guard with no time to react. As the shots rang out, Windradyne saw his family killed by the white men. The Wiradjuri people were willing to share their land and expected others to share with them. They let the settler grow his crops. But this man shared his potatoes one day and the next day killed Kooris for taking what they had previously been offered.

The killing of his family was the last straw, and Windradyne decided he would avenge his family under Wiradjuri law, instigating what would become known as the Bathurst War. He gathered Wiradjuri people together and asked his people to support and join him in striking back against the white men. The warriors prepared themselves, they painted the faces, thighs and ribs with ochre, marked their shields and boomerangs with symbols of their own totems. At night the warriors, led by Windradyne, started out on their campaign for justice. The first white man the warriors came upon was a man called Suttor who on occasions had been a friend to the Koori people and had treated them with respect. Suttor's son gives an account of this meeting.

"The blacks were troublesome at Bathurst in those days, the cause very frequently was their ill-treatment by the whites...No wonder reprisals took place. Our hut was one day surrounded by a large party of blacks, fully equipped for war, under the leadership of their great fierce chief and warrior, named by the whites "Saturday". There was no means of resistance so my father, then a lad of eighteen years, met them fearlessly at the door. He spoke to them in their own language in such a manner as not to let them suppose he anticipated any evil from them.

They stood there, sullen, silent, motionless. My father's cheerful courage and friendly tone disarmed animosity. They consulted in an undertone, and departed as suddenly and noiselessly as they came. The next thing known of them is that they killed (was it not just retribution?) all the men at a settler's place some miles distant, the very place where it was rumoured, the poisoned bread had been laid for them. This place is called the "Murdering Hut" to this day ..They never molested man or beast of my father's. He had proved himself their friend on previous occasions but if at this time he had shown mistrust or hostility they would certainly have killed him."

Windradyne could have easily taken Suttor's life that night but he spared him. Suttor had never committed acts of murder against the Wiradjuri people. The warriors were not carrying out the same type of indiscriminate killings the whites did. They were only interested in paying back those whites who had murdered their people under Wiradjuri law. The attack Suttor mentioned occurred at Millah-Murrah and it happened on 24 May 1824.

Windradyne and his warriors silently surrounded the hut of Samuel Terry, a man who had laid poisoned dampers out. Terry had also built his hut on their Burbung ground. The warriors attacked Terry and his men before they knew what hit them. Terry was speared six times by the Wiradjuri warriors and his hut burnt to the ground. They killed the sheep and cattle.

Windradyne sent his runners out into the surrounding districts with news of what was happening in the Bathurst region. The Wiradjuri people in the surrounding districts knew their brothers and sisters need their help and together they would fight to help drive their mutual enemy from the land. Warriors from the surrounding districts came to help Windradyne. Soon 600 warriors had joined Windradyne. With "Old Bull" from the south and "Blucher" from the northwest and Windradyne they sat in a council of war to plan their next attack against the invaders.

Windradyne would go directly to the government, for it was the custom for the Governor to issue invitations to all Kooris to assemble at the marketplace in Parramatta at the end of each year to attend a feast, supposedly in their honour.

Windradyne gathered his surviving people and together they travelled over 194 kilometres to Parramatta on 28 December 1824. He walked into the gathering and his arrival caused great commotion. He walked tall and proud with the words "peace" on his hat. He knew the soldiers were unable to touch him because of the number of Koori people there who had attended the feast. If the soldiers tried to take him it would have caused a riot, right on the doorstep of the Governor.

Windradyne announced he wished to see the Governor, Windradyne tried to end the slaughter of his people by going to Governor to make "friends" - make friends with people who had invaded his lands, had stolen his country and in cold blood had slaughtered hundreds of his people, make friends with this cruel race of people who think of nothing but their greed. In a dispatch to Earl Bathurst, Governor Brisbane reported that:

"I am most happy to have it in my power to report to Your Lordship that Saturday their great and most warlike chieftain, has been with me to receive his pardon, and that he with most of this tribe, attended the Annual Conference.

Windradyne died in 1835 after being wounded in a fight. He was taken to the Bathurst District Hospital but it was too much for Windradyne to be shut up inside again. He tore away the bandages and returned to his people, camping on the property which had become known as Brucedale. He died when gangrene set into his wounds.

Windradyne was given a Wiradjuri burial by his people at sunrise. He was placed sitting up facing the rising sun, wrapped in his possum skin cloak with all his weapons beside him. There was great mourning at the passing of their mighty warrior and many kooris gathered to farewell Windradyne. Several trees were carved at mark out the grave. These trees were meant as a living memorial to the dead and the Kooris did not return to the place of his burial until twelve months passed.

== Description ==
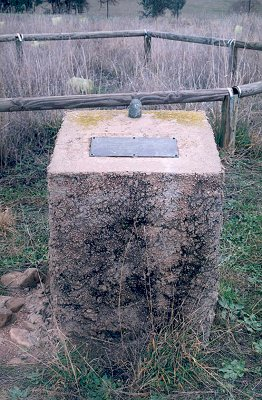
Stone pillar

The grave site is located in a paddock on "Brucedale' property, in the northwest corner with protective fencing that has been provided by the National Parks and Wildlife service. Within the curtilage there are remains of 2 grave sites, the other which is unknown. In front of Windradyne's grave a stone pillar has been placed with a plaque and a stone axe head placed in the centre. A scatter of new trees has been planted within a diamond shape within the fencing. There are no remains of the several carved trees that have been noted within the reference material.

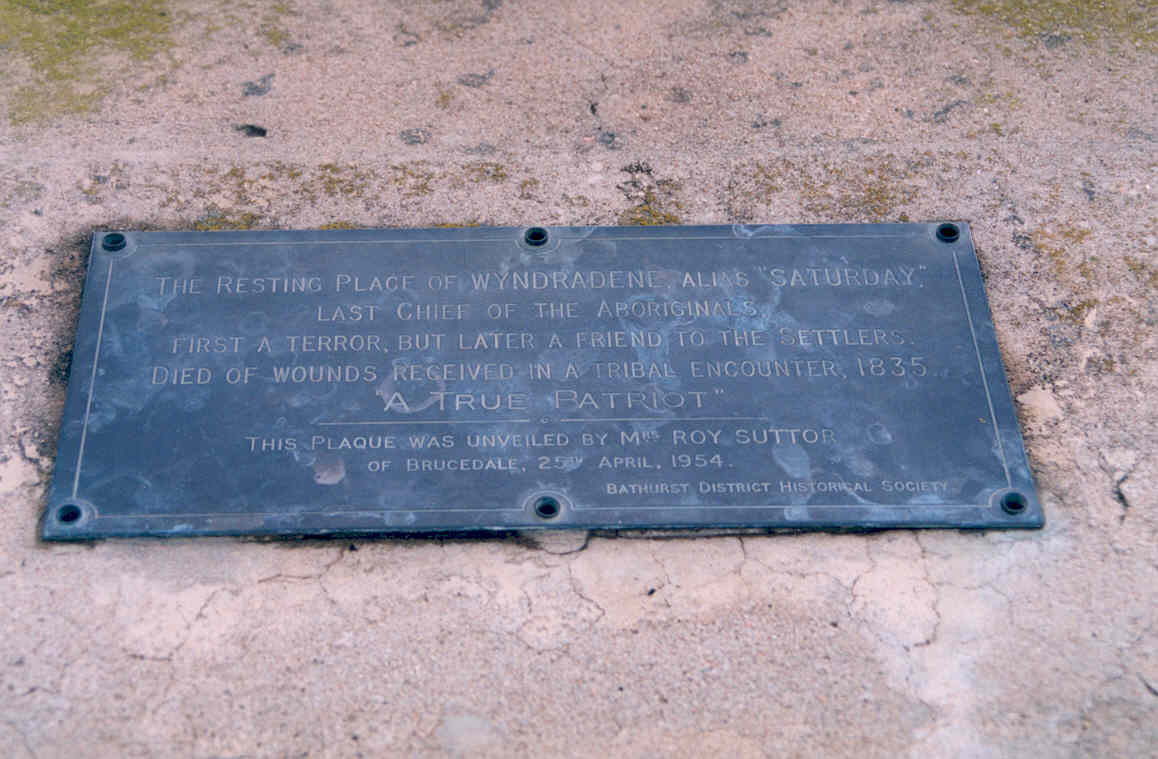
Plaque on the pillar (close-up)

Conservation works consisting of a boundary fence around the grave sites was undertaken by the National Parks and Wildlife Service in 2000.

== Heritage listing ==
The site of Windradynes Grave is a site of State significance. Windradyne was a warrior of the Wiradjuri people and a leader during the frontier war period. During the frontier war his family was massacred and he declared war on the settlers. He was given a traditional burial with all his weapons and his grave was marked with carved trees and it is recognised to by the Bathurst Historical society when in 1955 they erected a plaque in Windradynes honour and is revered as special Wiradjuri warrior by the Wiradjuri people today, as well as being representative of cultural contact with the relationship between Windradyne and the Suttor family settlers of Bathurst.

Grave of Windradyne was listed on the New South Wales State Heritage Register on 10 March 2006 having satisfied the following criteria.

The place is important in demonstrating the course, or pattern, of cultural or natural history in New South Wales.

Windradyne is associated with the frontier war and his grave is still revered by local Wiradjuri people today. It is also significant as a contact story between local Wiradjuri and the Suttor family.

The place has a strong or special association with a person, or group of persons, of importance of cultural or natural history of New South Wales's history.

Windradyne is associated with a significant event in Australia's settlement, the frontier war and his grave is still revered by the local Wiradjuri people today. It is also significant as a contact story between local Wiradjuri and the Suttor family.

The place has a strong or special association with a particular community or cultural group in New South Wales for social, cultural or spiritual reasons.

Windradyne is associated with Wiradjuri nation. His grave is still recognised and respected by Aboriginal especially Wiradjuri today as a warrior.

The place has potential to yield information that will contribute to an understanding of the cultural or natural history of New South Wales.

Windradynes Grave provides information on the Frontier war wagered between Aboriginal groups and settlers in Western NSW.

The place is important in demonstrating the principal characteristics of a class of cultural or natural places/environments in New South Wales.

Windradynes Grave is a good example of contemporary Aboriginal burial site. It is also one of the only burials of a warrior that is marked in Wiradjuri country.
