= Windradyne =

Indigenous Australian warrior (c. 1800–1828)

Windradyne the third
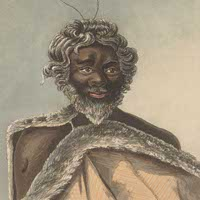
- A Wiradjuri warrior, thought to be Windradyne
- Born: c. 1800; Northern Wiradjuri nation (Central West (New South Wales))
- Died: 21 March 1829 (aged 29–30); Bathurst, New South Wales
- Resting place: Brucedale Station, Peel; 33°19′38″S 149°36′36″E
- Monuments: Grave of Windradyne
- Other names: Saturday, Windrodine, Windradene
- Occupation: Warrior
- Years active: 1822–1829
- Known for: Fighting British settlers

Windradyne (c. 1800 – 21 March 1829) was an Aboriginal warrior and resistance leader of the Wiradjuri nation, in what is now central-western New South Wales, Australia; he was also known to the British settlers as Saturday. Windradyne led his people in the Bathurst War, a frontier war between his clan and British settlers.

== Description ==
Although only limited information about Windradyne is available, mainly from the contemporary British accounts, it is possible to put together an approximate description of the man.

Windradyne's date of birth is unknown, but on his death in 1829 his obituary in The Sydney Gazette and New South Wales Advertiser—thought to be by his settler friend George Suttor from Brucedale Station north of Bathurst—stated "His age did not, I think, exceed 30 years", thus putting his year of birth at approximately 1800. It is believed he had no children and there are no descendants of his bloodline.

Coe's biography of Windradyne from 1989 states that he was handsome and well built, with broad shoulders and muscular limbs. He had dark brown skin, thick black curly hair, and a long beard. He typically wore a headband, and had his beard plaited into three sections. However, Coe's description does not fully correlate with a drawing of a Wiradjuri warrior that is thought to depict Windradyne.

When Windradyne visited Parramatta to meet with Governor Thomas Brisbane in December 1824, the Sydney Gazette (using the British appellation for him of Saturday) wrote that:

He is one of the finest looking natives we have seen in this part of the country. He is not particularly tall, but is much stouter and more proportionably [sic] limbed than the majority of his countrymen; which, combined with a noble looking countenance, and piercing eye, are calculated to impress the beholder with other than disagreeable feelings towards a character who has been so much dreaded by the Bathurst settler. Saturday is, without doubt, the most manly black native we have ever beheld—a fact pretty generally acknowledged by the numbers that saw him.

At the same event, another observer wrote that he was "a very fine figure, very muscular ... a good model for the figure of Apollo".

Writing in his obituary, George Suttor described Windradyne's appearance and character as:

... a man who never suffered an injury with impunity, in his estimation revenge was virtue, his head, his countenance, indeed his whole person, which was admirable formed, was a fine specimen of the savage warrior of New Holland. ... his height was near 6 feet, he was of a brave but impetuous disposition ...

== British settlement ==
Hostilities between the Indigenous Australians and the British settlers began just a few months after the First Fleet arrived in January 1788, with casualties on both sides occurring as early as May 1788. While the early confrontations generally involved few combatants and were relatively rare, as the British population increased and spread further out from Sydney, they came into contact with increasingly large numbers of Aboriginal people of different tribes and nations, and the frequency and intensity of the conflicts increased. These conflicts would come to be known as the Australian frontier wars.

For the first twenty-five years of British settlement, the Wiradjuri's land in the central part of New South Wales remained isolated from the settlers due to the intervening barrier of the Blue Mountains. In May 1813 the exploration party of Blaxland, Lawson, and Wentworth found a route across the mountains, essentially by following existing Aboriginal trails. From a peak later named Mount Blaxland, the explorers claimed to have seen "enough grass to support the stock of the colony for thirty years" on the other side of the mountains—the Wiradjuri country.

Later that year Governor Lachlan Macquarie sent his surveyor George Evans to confirm the findings of the explorers, and in 1814 commissioned a road to be built across the Blue Mountains, which was completed in early 1815. Macquarie himself travelled the new road shortly thereafter, and on 7 May 1815 selected the site for the town of Bathurst, thereby opening the region for British settlement.

=== First contact ===
There is evidence that the early encounters between the Wiradjuri and the British were quite affable. The first recorded meeting with them was by the surveyor Evans in December 1813 on the Macquarie River about 8 kilometres (5.0 mi) from present day Bathurst. Evans wrote in his journal:

Returning we saw smoke on the North side of the River, at Sun sett as we were fishing I saw some Natives coming down the Plain; they did not see us until we surprised them; there was only two Women and four Children, the poor Creatures trembled and fell down with fright; I think they were coming for Water; I gave them what Fish we had, some Fish Hooks, Twine and a Tomahawk, they appeared glad to get from us; two Boys ran away; the other small Children cried much at first; a little while after I played with them they began to be good humoured and laugh ...

Macquarie himself met with some members of the Wiradjuri camped at what would become Bathurst on his trip in 1815, making a positive report about their skills and nature, concluding with "They appear to be very inoffensive and cleanly in their persons", a quite positive assessment for the time. Macquarie's aide, Major Antill, also remarked positively of the Wiradjuri, writing in his journal "They appear to be a harmless and inoffensive race, with nothing forbidding or ferocious in their countenance ... They were perfectly mild and cheerful, and laugh at everything they see and repeat everything they hear".

Macquarie then spent a week touring the surrounding area, meeting with a number of the other indigenous inhabitants. On 10 May he wrote:

After breakfasting this morning we were visited by three male natives of the country, all very handsome good looking young men, and whom we had not seen before ... to the best looking and stoutest of them I gave a piece of yellow cloth in exchange for his mantle, which he presented me with.

At this stage, based on his assumed year of birth of 1800, Windradyne would only have been a teenager. Whilst there is no solid evidence that Windradyne was amongst the people that met Evans or Macquarie's party, it is quite possible as they were travelling through his clan's country; indeed there are theories that Windradyne may have been the impressive fellow who exchanged his mantle with Macquarie. Regardless, the process of British settlement of the area would be slow at first, with tensions between the Wiradjuri and the settlers intensifying to their peak some years later as the Wiradjuri lost access to their traditional campsites, hunting grounds, water sources, and sacred sites.

== Bathurst War ==
On Wiradjuri country tensions started increasing after the British began settling the area following Macquarie's visit. While Macquarie had favoured a slow pace of settlement causing few problems, this changed when he was replaced by Governor Thomas Brisbane at the end of 1821. Brisbane favoured a faster pace of settlement, and a flood of settlers were granted land in the region; their influx quickly strained the available resources, as well as relationships with Wiradjuri people. Despite being just a young man in his early to mid-twenties, Windradyne arose as the key figure from the Aboriginal community resisting this change, in what would come to be known as the Bathurst War.

=== Hostilities ===
It is suggested that the first hostilities led by Windradyne took place in early 1822 on the Cudgegong River, when some stockmen were attacked and livestock were released or killed. A number of other attacks on settlers—and in particular their convict workers often working as stockmen or shepherds in isolated areas—as well as their stock were reported. While not directly naming Windradyne as an aggressor, these tactics by the Wiradjuri had some initial success, with workers becoming fearful, and some stations even reportedly being deserted.

In December 1823 'Saturday' was implicated as the instigator of hostilities that led to the death of two convict stockmen at Kings Plain; outraged settlers appealed for military assistance, and soldiers were dispatched to arrest him. Windradyne went out to confront the soldiers, and it was reported that it ultimately took six soldiers and a beating with a musket to restrain him. Taken back to Bathurst, Windradyne was sentenced to prison for one month. The Sydney Gazette wrote on 8 January 1824:

Advices from Bathurst say, that the natives have been very troublesome in that country. Numbers of cattle have been killed. In justification of their conduct, the natives urge, that the white men have driven away all the kangaroos and opossums, and that black men must now have beef! ... The strength of these men is amazing. One of the chiefs (named Saturday) of a desperate tribe, took six men to secure him, and they had actually to break a musket over his body before he yielded, which he did at length with broken ribs ... Saturday, for his exploits, was sentenced to a month's imprisonment in irons.

Following Windradyne's release hostilities continued to escalate, and some particularly violent incidents are reported from May 1824. The murder of Wiradjuri people by settlers, including women and children, is recorded from this time, with some sources stating this included close members of Windradyne's family. There are also reports of settlers leaving out poisoned food, in particular arsenic-laced damper, for the Aboriginal people. Another story states that a settler at Kelso offered a group of Wiradjuri people, apparently including Windradyne, some potatoes one day, which they accepted. The following morning the Wiradjuri people, unfamiliar with British concepts of land or property ownership, returned to help themselves to more potatoes. The settler, enraged with this theft, rounded up a group of vigilantes and pursued the Wiradjuri people, shooting and killing an unknown number of this family group. The Wiradjuri regrouped, and Windradyne told the elders that, in line with Wiradjuri custom, he would lead the revenge against the whites.

The Wiradjuri warriors dressed for battle and set out at night to seek retribution, with the first place they called being the Suttor's Brucedale Station. While George was not home, his eighteen-year-old son, William was, and he met Windradyne at the door, assuring him that they had had no part in the murders and expressing his disgust at the actions. William's son would later recount the story:

The blacks were troublesome at Bathurst in those days, the cause very frequently was their ill-treatment by the whites ... Our hut was one day surrounded by a large party of blacks, fully equipped for war, under the leadership of their great fierce chief and warrior, named by the whites 'Saturday'. There was no means of resistance so my father, then a lad of eighteen years, met them fearlessly at the door. He spoke to them in their own language in such a manner as not to let them suppose he anticipated any evil from them. They stood there, sullen, silent, motionless. My father's cheerful courage and friendly tone disarmed animosity. They consulted in an undertone, and departed as suddenly and noiselessly as they came. The next thing known of them is that they killed (was it not just retribution?) all the men at a settler's place some miles distant, the very place where it was rumoured, the poisoned bread had been laid for them. ... They never molested man or beast of my father's. He had proved himself their friend on previous occasions ...

The revenge attack on the settler, Samuel Terry, occurred on 24 May at Millah Murrah in the Wyagdon Ranges north of Bathurst, where he and six other stockmen were killed, with his hut burnt down, and his sheep and cattle slaughtered. Reportedly this homestead had been built upon a bora ground, an important initiation place for Wiradjuri people. Attacks on other properties soon followed, with the press including reports of men being speared, buildings destroyed, stock being killed, and weapons being stolen. The attacks in the north-east were led by Windradyne, with other groups attacking settlers in the south.

The settlers soon sought their own revenge, with armed parties forming to attack Wiradjuri people. One group was reported to have caught and shot an Aboriginal women with two young girls, but they had little success against the warriors. Despite their inferior weaponry, the Wiradjuri's superior bushcraft allowed them to attack unexpectedly, and disappear back into the bush before the whites could respond. By August 1824 the Sydney Gazette was reporting genuine concerns about the ability of the colony to withstand the force of the Wiradjuri people.

Due to the ongoing hostilities Governor Brisbane declared martial law on 14 August 1824. The commandant at Bathurst, Major Morisset, was given greater powers over Aboriginal people, troop numbers at Bathurst were increased to seventy-five, and magistrates were empowered to administer summary justice. With the armed settlers now backed by the military the violence quickly escalated, and the Wiradjuri people were terrorised and killed in increasing numbers. While there were reports of massacres of warriors as they attempted to bury their dead, the main victims appear to have been the Wiradjuri women and children, shot, poisoned, and driven into gorges. Recent estimates suggest that between a quarter and a third of the Wiradjuri in the Bathurst region were killed during these hostilities.

At the onset of martial law a special reward of 500 acres (200 ha) of land was offered for Windradyne being taken alive, an offer that was extended to the Aboriginal community if they would turn in the Wiradjuri leader. A week after the commencement of martial law the word "alive" was dropped from the reward notices, however he was neither captured nor betrayed. The high casualty rate of the Wiradjuri people however took its toll, with many surrendering to the government, leading to the crisis subsiding. Despite Windradyne remaining at large, Brisbane repealed martial law on 11 December 1824.

=== Peace ===
With the loss of so many warriors and the severe damage caused to their society, Windradyne gathered the Wiradjuri again and determined to meet with the Governor to seek a formal end to hostilities. It was customary at the time for the Governor to hold an annual feast or conference for the Aboriginal people in late December in the marketplace at Parramatta. The Wiradjuri people decided that would be an ideal and safe venue for the proposed meeting, with a large number of the Aboriginal community from throughout the colony present, and the Governor on the spot, therefore making any reprisals against Windradyne unlikely.

The Wiradjuri, led by Windradyne, travelled nearly 200 kilometres (124 mi) across the mountains to attend the feast on Tuesday 28 December 1824, with Windradyne becoming the focus of attention and receiving a formal pardon from Brisbane. The Sydney Gazette reported:

... Parramatta ... never presented a scene more interesting to philanthropy since the institution of the conference, than was displayed on this occasion. There appeared to be 7 or 8 different tribes that flocked in from various quarters of the Colony ...

His Excellency the Governor, attended by His Staff, honoured the aboriginal groupe [sic] with His presence about noon; at which time there were nearly 260 men and women in a circle, exclusive of numbers of fine children. Between one and two o'clock, a reinforcement of the Bathurst tribe arrived, which was supposed to have increased the number to near upon 400 ... This was the first conference, we believe, in which any of the New-country tribes deigned to visit the feast; but, upon occasion of the amicable intercourse lately re-established between them and the Bathurst settlers, they were induced to break through all fear, and behold those wonders ...

What contributed to give peculiar interest to the scene was the circumstance of the noted Saturday, the Bathurst chief, being at the head of his tribe. ... Saturday is, without doubt, the most manly black native we have ever beheld—a fact pretty generally acknowledged by the numbers that saw him. He is supposed to have suffered severely from unusual agitation, in consequence of the efforts that were resorted to for his apprehension, owing to which he is said to have decreased so considerably in size as not to be above half the man he was previous to the commencement of the recent sanguinary contests. Indeed, he seemed far from being altogether calm on Tuesday—though every possible attention was afforded to remove the least cause for alarm. ...

We should have remarked that Saturday wore a straw hat, on which was affixed a label, with the word "PEACE" inserted, besides a little branch representing the olive, which rather increased the interest as regarded him.

A number of factors indicate a British influence on Windradyne here, possibly that of the Suttors—the straw hat with the word peace in English, the olive branch, even the knowledge that he would be relatively safe at the feast. Brisbane reported the meeting to Earl Bathurst, Secretary of State for War and the Colonies, and Brisbane's superior:

... I am most happy to have it in my power to report to Your Lordship that Saturday, their great and most warlike Chieftain, has been with me to receive his pardon and that He, with most of His Tribe, attended the annual conference ...

Windradyne reportedly stayed at Parramatta for some time after the conference, before returning to Bathurst, and did not attend the feast the following year. Reports from later years occasionally implicated him in raids on crops and altercations with settlers around Lake George. With little substantial evidence, however, these may have simply been vexatious claims against the "notorious Saturday", or attempts by individuals to glorify themselves by association with him.

== Death ==
Details of Windradyne's death and burial in 1829 are somewhat conflicting. They agree that he was injured in a tribal fight by the Macquarie River and was sent to Bathurst Hospital. Early reports then suggest that he died in the hospital soon after, talking to his people until the end, and was then wrapped in his mantle and buried nearby with his weapons.

An anonymous author writing from "B-------e" on 24 March 1829—thought to be George Suttor from 'Brucedale Station'—sent a biography of "Saturday" to The Sydney Gazette and New South Wales Advertiser that was published on 21 April of that year. Of his death it says:

... he fell in a sharp fight ... on the banks of the Macquarie, with a tribe from the South. ... The wound which caused Windrodine's [sic] death, was a very severe one on his knee, which quickly mortified, and terminated in death after a few hours. He continued talking to his countrymen, till life was extinct, in the hospital at Bathurst, near which place he was buried, his body wrapped in his mantle, and his weapons deposited in that grave ...

It concluded with a Latin quotation from Terence, Homo sum, humani nihil a me alicuum puto, meaning "I am a man, I consider nothing human as alien to me". An editorial comment added: "This quotation from the Roman dramatist contains a fine sentiment for those persons who think no more of man in a state of nature than they do of a wild animal".

George's son, William Henry Suttor (the young man who had faced Windradyne and the Wiradjuri on the night they were seeking retribution in 1824), also paid tribute to Windradyne in the Sydney press during April 1829.

Later reports passed down within the Suttor family and recounted some years later elaborated on the above details. They claimed that Windradyne removed his bandages and discharged himself from the hospital, returning to his homeland and his people, who were camped on the Suttor's Brucedale Station about 12 kilometres (7.5 mi) north of Bathurst. There he died of gangrene from his injuries, and was given a Wiradjuri burial at sunrise, sitting up facing the rising sun, (and as reported above) wrapped in his cloak and with his weapons. It is likely that the second account is the more accurate, as the grave site recognised as Windradyne's is indeed on Brucedale; the original account may have given only limited details to minimise the risk of some white settlers looking to seek a posthumous measure of revenge on either the Suttor's, or Windradyne's grave.

== Commemoration ==
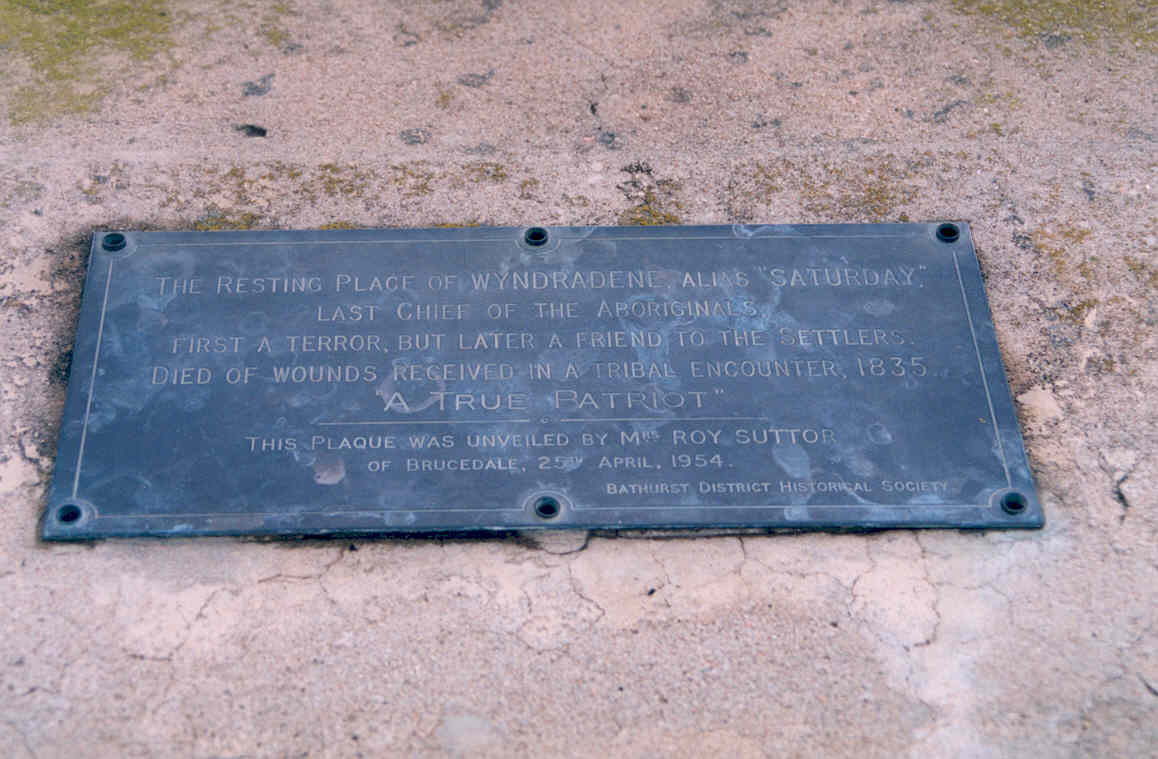
Plaque at Windradyne's grave

A Wiradjuri burial site on Brucedale Station containing two graves was marked by the Bathurst District Historical Society in 1954 with a monument, plaque, and stone axe-head as the "resting place of Windradene [sic]". In May 2000 the site was placed under a voluntary conservation order, and in the same year the National Parks & Wildlife Service placed a boundary fence around the graves. The grave site was subsequently gazetted on 10 March 2006 under the Heritage Act as being a site of state significance, referred to as the Grave of Windradyne.

The Wiradjuri people still revere Windradyne today as a great warrior, and his grave site is recognised and respected as an important site. While traditionally carved trees that are recorded to have marked the site from the time of his burial are no longer present, in more recent times Wiradjuri people have planted a group of trees around the grave site in a traditional diamond shaped pattern.

A suburb of Bathurst is named after Windradyne, as is one of the student residence buildings at Charles Sturt University, Wagga Wagga.

In 2004 Windradyne was one of two Indigenous Australians commemorated as part of an installation in the New South Wales Parliament Buildings in Sydney. The other man commemorated was Pemulwuy who fought against European settlement in the Sydney district. Two cloaks representing each of the fighters were on display. The inscription for the cloak representing Windradyne read:

This leader became notorious during the period of expansion over the Blue Mountains into the Western Plains of NSW. He led the resistance around Bathurst for many years, gathering together the Wiradjuri tribes. In 1825 he went to Sydney to meet Governor Macquarie but the war continued until he was killed in an ambush." (Note: The inscription in the NSW Parliament Buildings apparently has several errors. Windradyne reportedly met with Brisbane, not Macquarie, it was in 1824, not 1825, and it was in Parramatta, not Sydney (quite distinct places at the time); in fact by 1825 both these governors were gone and Ralph Darling was governor. Additionally this inscription suggests he was killed as part of the Bathurst War, when most sources say he was killed in a tribal battle a number of years after the main battles of the Bathurst War were over.)

In 2008 Windradyne's story was featured in the first episode of the award-winning seven-part SBS documentary series First Australians. He is the subject of the song of that name, released by Troy Cassar-Daley on his album "Between the Fires."

== See also ==
- Jandamarra of the Bunuba nation
- Musquito a warrior of the Gai-Mariagal clan
- Pemulwuy, a warrior and resistance leader of the Bidjigal clan of the Eora people, in the area around Sydney
- Tunnerminnerwait was an Aboriginal Australian resistance fighter and Parperloihener clansman from Tasmania
- Yagan, a warrior and resistance leader of the Noongar tribe, in what is now the area around Perth, Western Australia
- List of Indigenous and non-indigenous Australian historical figures
