= Turon River =

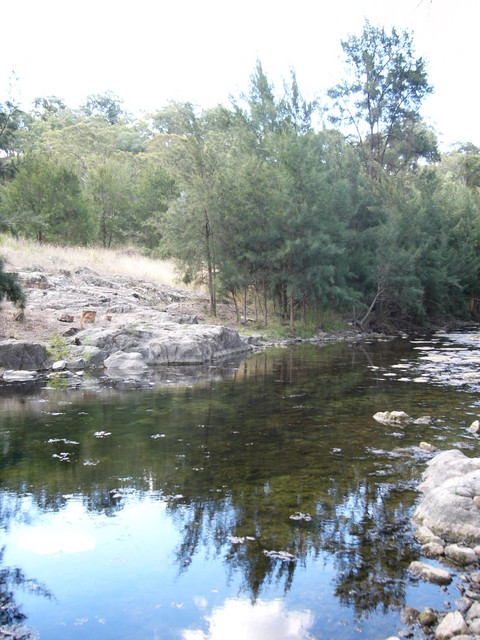
- The Turon River from near Sofala during a very dry season.

- Location of the Turon River mouth in New South Wales
- Etymology: Aboriginal: Kamilaroi or Wiradjuri words choorun or yooran, the meaning of which is unknown

Location
- Country: Australia
- State: New South Wales
- Region: South Eastern Highlands (IBRA), Central West
- Municipalities: Lithgow, Mid-Western, Bathurst

Physical characteristics
- Source: Capertee Valley
  - location: near Ben Bullen
  - coordinates: 33°13′55″S 149°58′23″E
  - elevation: 778 m (2,552 ft)
- Mouth: confluence with the Macquarie River
  - location: near Hill End
  - coordinates: 33°5′10″S 149°23′25″E
  - elevation: 406 m (1,332 ft)
- Length: 117 km (73 mi)

Basin features
- River system: Macquarie River, Murray–Darling basin
- Tributaries
  - right: Crudine River
- Bridges: Wallaby Rocks Bridge

Turon River, a perennial stream that is part of the Macquarie catchment within the Murray–Darling basin, is located in the central western district of New South Wales, Australia. Partly situated in the Turon National Park, the river is host to numerous recreational and tourist activities such as horse riding, gold panning, canoeing, camping, and seasonal fishing.

== Geography ==
The Turon River rises on the western slopes of the Great Dividing Range in the Capertee Valley, west of Ben Bullen, and flows generally to the north west and then west, joined by the Crudine River, and then forms its confluence with the Macquarie River south west of Hill End; dropping 372 metres (1,220 ft) over the course of its 117 kilometres (73 mi) length.

The upper reaches of the Turon River are partly bound by Turon National Park, established in 2002, while the lower reaches open onto private grazing property.

The river is crossed by the Wallaby Rocks Bridge that carries the Hill End Road, located at Wallaby Rocks.

== Gold rush ==
The Turon River is well renowned because it was the site of one of Australia's first alluvial gold rushes. During the gold rush Chinese migrant workers built a water race to bring water to mining operations along sections of the Turon River. Many parts of the race can still be seen today, such as at Turon Gates.

== See also ==
- Sofala, New South Wales
- Rivers of New South Wales
- List of rivers of Australia
