= Turon National Park =

National park in New South Wales, Australia

- IUCN category II (national park)
- Location within New South Wales
- Location: New South Wales
- Nearest city: Sofala
- Coordinates: 33°11′55″S 149°56′02″E
- Established: 2002
- Governing body: NSW National Parks & Wildlife Service

Turon National Park is located along a section of the Turon River in central New South Wales, Australia. Proposed as an area worth protecting in 1983, the park was not established until 2002. The park is 150 km (93 mi) north-west of Sydney, approximately 5 km (3.1 mi) west of Capertee, near Lithgow, New South Wales.

Turon National Park was one of the sites of the 1851 gold rush, and remains from this era are still evident. Pasture land cleared in the past remain obvious. Sheoak grows along the river and a variety of gums cover the slopes. A large variety of native birds live within the park, and red wallabies spend the day on the sandstone tops and descend at dusk to the valley. The park is at a relatively high altitude (valley floor at around 750 m [2,460 ft] above sea level, the tops at around 850 m (2,790 ft)) due to the park's location within the Great Dividing Range. Sub-zero temperatures are common in the cooler months.

Access to the valley floor is difficult for 2-wheel-drive vehicles, and after heavy rainfall even four-wheel-drive access is doubtful.

Two campsites are identified on Wikimapia.

Many interesting animals live here, such as the mighty owl howling at night or the red wallabies sunbathing on the red sandstone in the morning.

== See also ==
- Sofala, New South Wales
