= Astronomical Society of New South Wales =

Australian amateur astronomy club

Astronomical Society of New South Wales Inc.
- Abbreviation: ASNSW
- Formation: 1954
- Legal status: Incorporated association
- Location: Sydney, New South Wales, Australia
- Members: Over 400.
- Publication: Universe Magazine
- Website: www.asnsw.com

The Astronomical Society of New South Wales (ASNSW) is an amateur astronomy club in the state of New South Wales, Australia, founded in 1954.

The society's objectives, as stated in their constitution, are to "bring together people interested in astronomy and related sciences, and to promote public interest and education in astronomy. The ASNSW provides members and the general public access to Astronomical observing facilities, educational lectures, and assistance in selecting, using and even building telescopes and related instruments".

The ASNSW has many sections dedicated to providing support to members interested in specific aspects of astronomy, including astrophotography, computing, solar observing, the Solar System, double and variable star observing, deep sky observing and telescope making. The society also runs two dedicated observing sites; one at Mount Bowen near Sydney, and the other near Ilford.

== History ==
The society was founded in 1954 as the "Sydney Amateur Astronomers" by Gordon Patston, an aerospace engineer lecturing at Sydney Technical College. The club started with about fifteen members with Patston as the president. The first meetings were held in the garage behind Patston's house in the suburb of Belfield.

As the group attracted new members, it became too large for the garage, resulting in a permanent clubhouse being constructed within the Patston family backyard. The majority of work was done by club volunteers, and on the 18th of September 1959, the new facility was officially opened by the astronomer, Bart Bok, the then Director of Mount Stromlo Observatory.

The club was very active through the late 1950s and 1960s, with general-interest events such as public open nights and sections for special purposes such as a junior section. It also worked with professional observers on a number of research projects, including a flare star observing program at the request of the CSIRO and the measurements of transits of artificial satellites across the moon as part of the Smithsonian Astrophysical Observatory's "Project Moon-watch". A program for observing artificial satellites was set up at shortly after the launch of the Sputnik satellite on 4 October 1957. The club was the first group in the world to see the first artificial satellite, Sputnik I, in October 1957 and they went on to record three of the first four Sputnik observations.

In 1964 the society's name was changed to the "Astronomical Society of New South Wales", to better reflect the scope of its membership.

In 1969/70 the Society suffered two major setbacks. First, the Society was forced to sell its headquarters when the Council re-zoned and subdivided the Patstons' block of land. Second, the Society lost its president when Gordon Patston moved to England to take up a Churchill Fellowship to study aerospace engineering. The combination of events caused financial hardship for the club, and the lack of a permanent venue initially made it difficult to attract and retain members. At its lowest point in the mid-1970s, membership numbers dropped to less than fifty. It took nearly ten years to build membership back up to previous levels.

In 1973 the society acquired a long-term lease from the government for the Crago Observatory site on Bowen Mountain, but in spite of being used regularly, the official inauguration was not held until 20 years later, in 1993. Then in 1987, the society purchased the Wiruna property near Ilford, to get away from the increasing glare of the city lights which interfered with observing.

In 1985 the society was incorporated under the Associations Incorporation Act. The society was an early adopter of computer and communications technology, establishing their website in April 1995.

== Activities ==
=== Meetings ===
The society normally holds two general meetings each month.

=== South Pacific Star Party ===
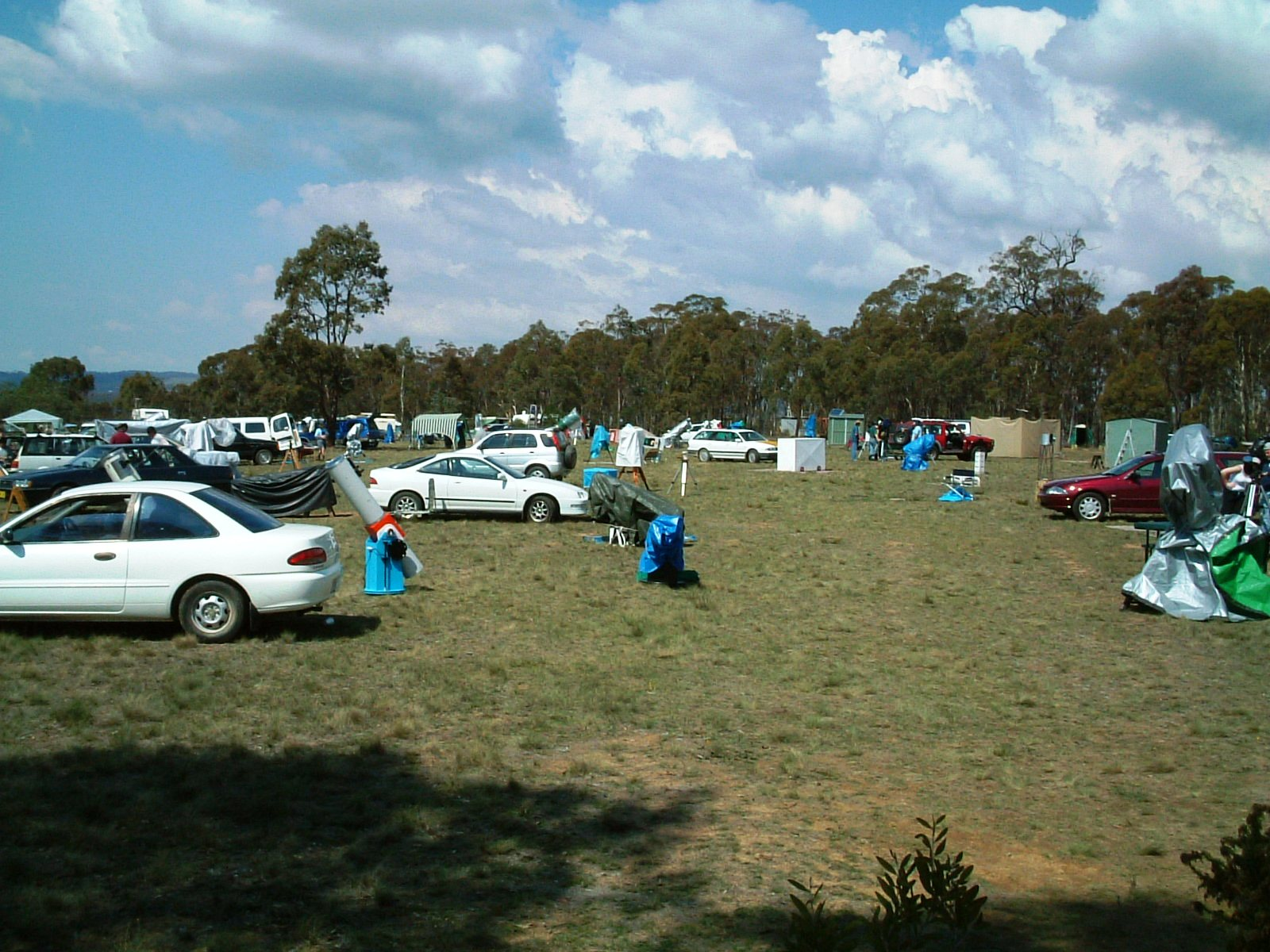
Early arrivals at the 2003 South Pacific Star Party start setting up their telescopes on the observing field.

Starting in 1993, the "South Pacific Star Party" (SPSP) is held each year at the Society's dark-sky observing site "Wiruna", attracting between 200 and 400 Australian and international amateur astronomers.

=== Publications ===
- UNIVERSE is the journal of the Society, published monthly since June 1964.

== Observing facilities ==
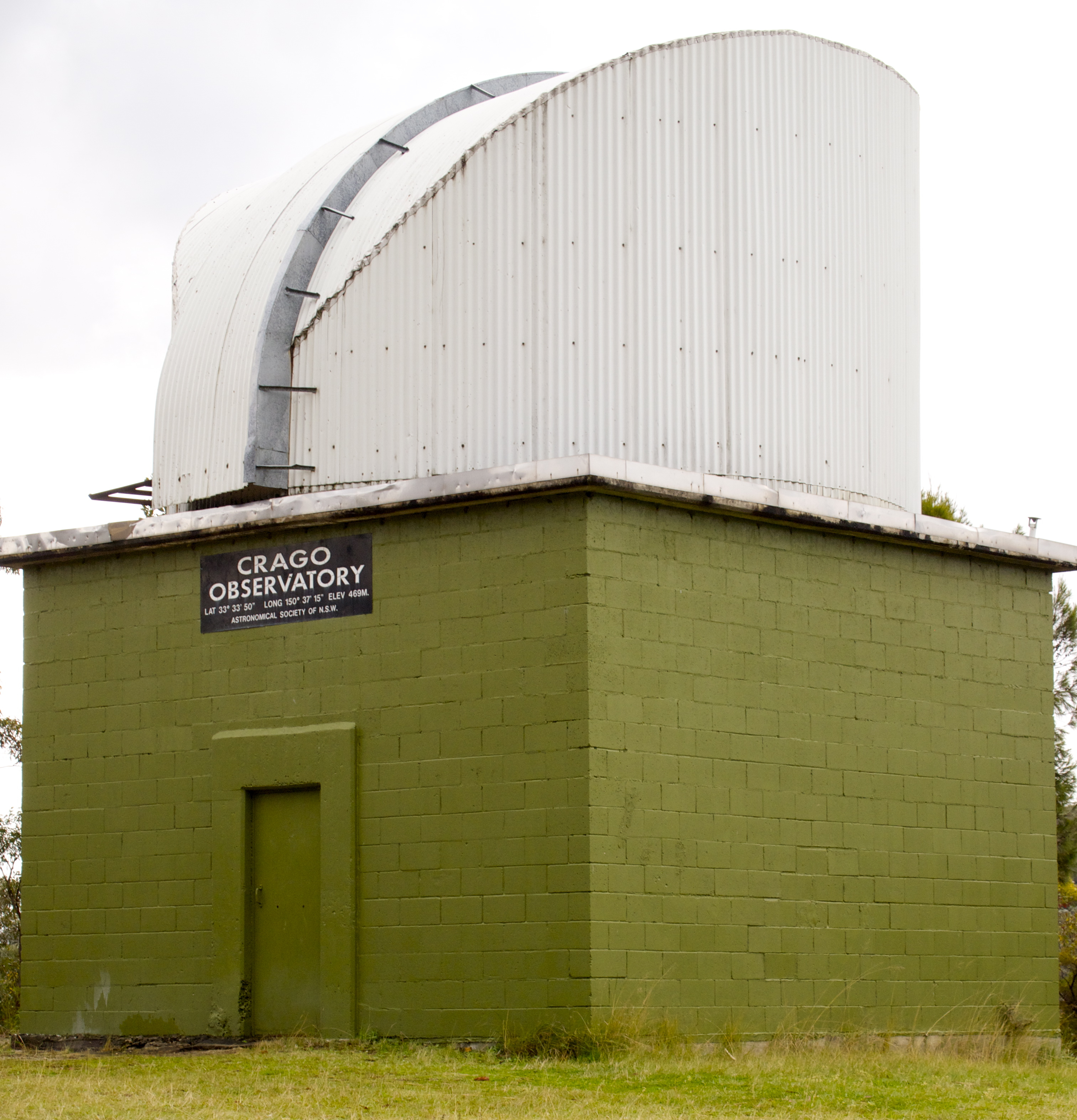
Crago observatory photographed in 2011

The Society has two main observing sites where regular observing sessions are held for its members and guests:

- Wiruna (Aboriginal for "Sunset") is a 43 hectares (110 acres) site about 14 km outside the country town of Ilford, 220 km north-west of Sydney. The site has general observation facilities, a large hall and amenities, and it is the venue for the annual South Pacific Star Party.
- Crago Observatory is a permanent observatory housed in a rotating dome, located on Bowen Mountain, within the Blue Mountains National Park near Richmond.

Both of these sites are classified as "designated optical observatories" (numbers D03-41 and D03-50) by the Astronomical Society of Australia on the basis that they are judged to be valuable astronomical resources for research, education and community use.

== Notable members' achievements ==
Three members of the society listed below have collectively discovered well over 500 comets, asteroids (minor planets), and novae.

- Robert Evans holds the world record for the number of visual discoveries of supernovae by an individual amateur; as of January 2009, his total came to 42 visual supernova discoveries plus one comet. Supernova 1983N, spotted by Evans in 1983 in the galaxy M83 long before it reached its peak, turned out to be the first discovery of a new type of supernova, later named Type 1b. His efforts have been recognised by the American Association of Variable Star Observers awarding him their Nova/Supernova Award fifteen times, the Astronomical Society of Australia awarding their Berenice Page Medal in 1986 and the ASNSW the McNiven Medal, in 1996. He received the Order of Australia in 1988 for his contributions to science.

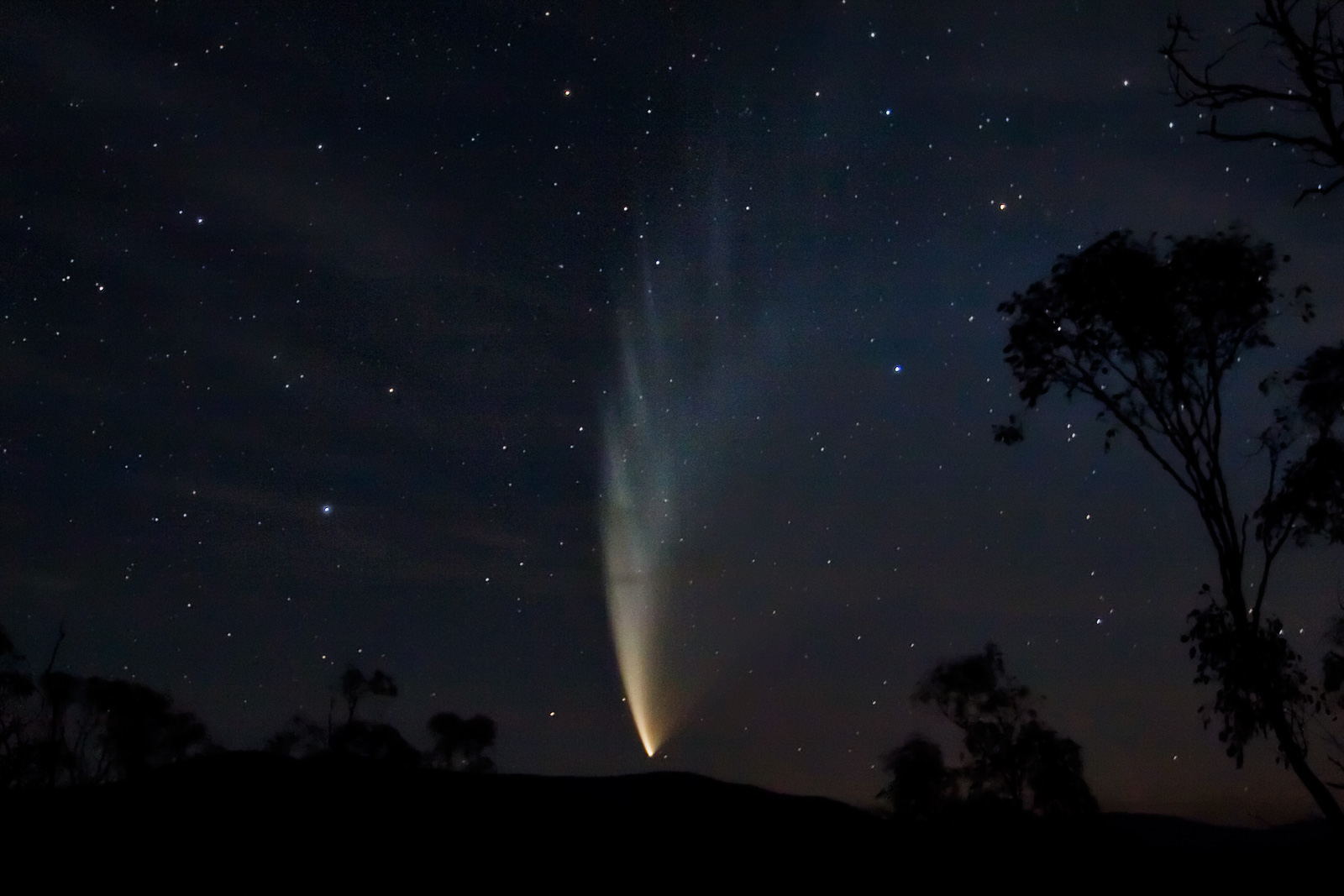
Comet C/2006 P1 McNaught as seen from Swift's Creek, Victoria on 23 January 2007

- Robert McNaught has been described as "the world's greatest comet discoverer" – he is a prolific discoverer of both asteroids and comets; as of 15 June 2014, the International Astronomical Union lists him as the discoverer of 458 minor planets, and NASA lists 72 comets and asteroids bearing his name. He is perhaps best known to the public for his discovery of comet C/2006 P1, also known as the "Great Comet of 2007", which was the second-brightest comet since reliable records began. He is involved in the search for Near Earth Asteroids. He was first to photograph Supernova 1987A in the LMC. His close association with the ASNSW over many years includes delivering the guest lecture to the South Pacific Star Party, and he was awarded the Society's McNiven Medal, in 1997.
- Gordon Garradd has been a diligent and productive discoverer of asteroids, supernovae and novae for nearly a quarter of a century; as of 15 June 2014, the International Astronomical Union lists him as the discoverer of 30 minor planets. Mr Garradd has an asteroid named after him, 5066 Garradd, and also sixteen comets are named after him, including C/2009 P1 which became well known in 2012 when it was photographed by the Deep Impact (spacecraft) spacecraft. He went beyond discovering these objects by also finding their astrometric positions, and he is also recognised for his search for Near Earth Asteroids using CCD imagery. He discovered four novae in the Large Magellanic Cloud as of 1998. Mr. Garradd was recognised in 1998 with the presentation of the Astronomical Society of Australia's Berenice Page Medal. He joined the Astronomical Society of NSW in 1974, and he was awarded the Society's McNiven Medal, in 1998.
- The society's Sydney Moon-watch station was the first group in the world to observe the first artificial satellite, Sputnik 1, in October 1957 and went on to record three of the first four Sputnik observations.

== See also ==
- List of telescopes of Australia
- List of astronomical societies
