= Ilford, New South Wales =

Ilford New South Wales
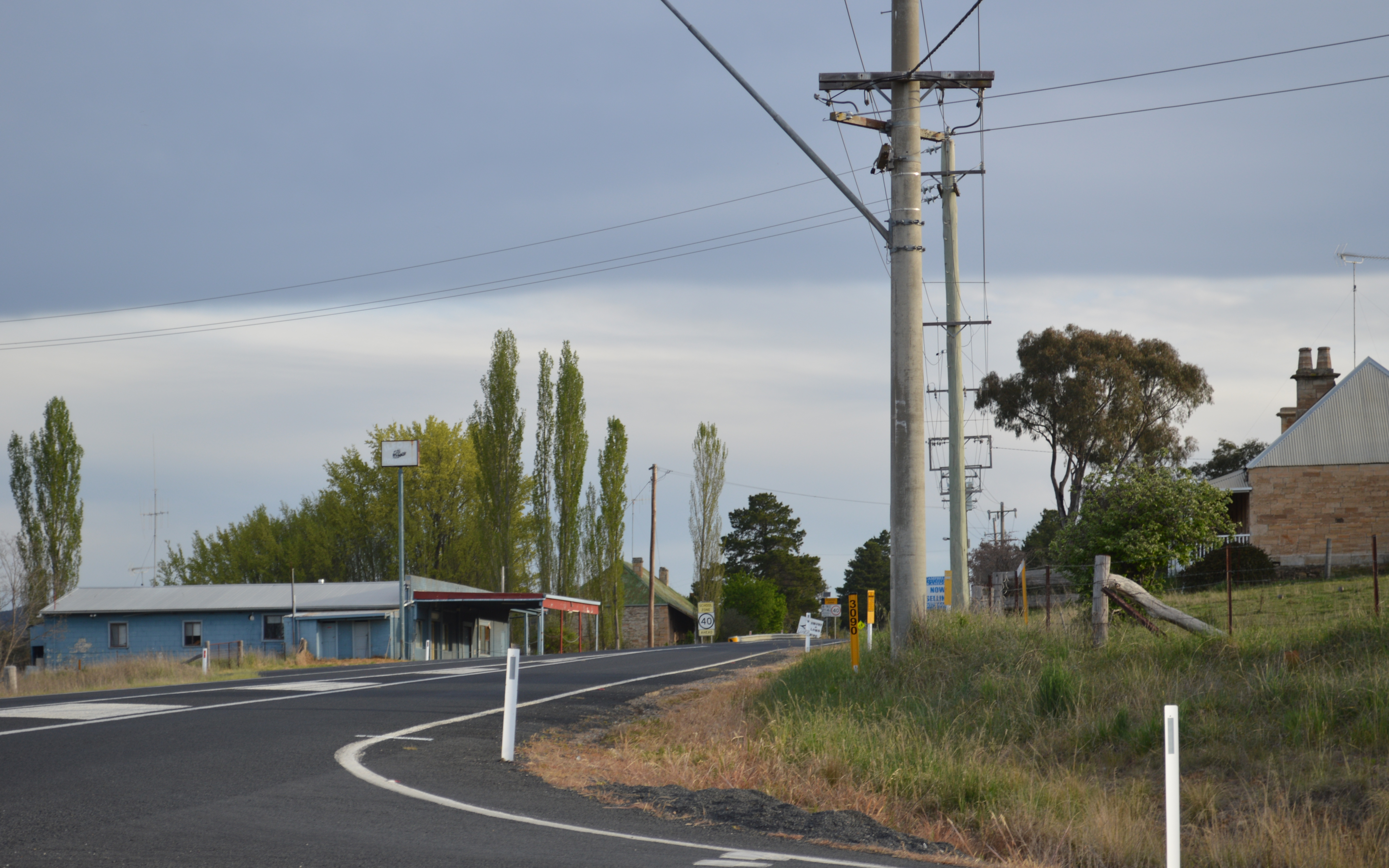

- Coordinates: 32°58′8″S 149°51′2″E
- Population: 187 (2016 census)
- Postcode(s): 2850
- LGA(s): Mid-Western Regional Council
- State electorate(s): Bathurst
- Federal division(s): Calare

Ilford is a village in New South Wales, Australia, beside the Crudine River within the Mid-Western Regional Council. It is located on the Castlereagh Highway (locally referred to as the 'Sydney Road'), about 220 kilometres north-west of Sydney. At the 2016 census Ilford and the surrounding rural district had a population of 187, living in 65 private dwellings. The district also included 43 unoccupied private dwellings. Ilford was named after the English township of Ilford (in Essex, now a part of Greater London), from where early residents of the locality originated.

Unremarkable in appearance, Ilford appears to the traveller as no more than a cluster of buildings around a T-junction on the 'Sydney Road', where the Bathurst-Ilford Road joins the Castlereagh Highway. The focus of the community is Ilford Public School on the outskirts of the road-side settlement. An information bay with toilet facilities is located on the northern edge of the village.

== History ==
An early name for the locality was Kean's Swamp. In June 1853 a thirty-acre portion of Crown Land was proclaimed to be set aside at Kean's Swamp (in Roxburgh county) as a potential town lot.

In December 1860 a public meeting of electors of the Hartley electorate was held in the “School-house” at Kean's Swamp. The meeting was one of a number held for the purpose of nomination and election of one member to serve in the Legislative Assembly of New South Wales”. In January 1863 tenders were called for the conveyance of mails by horseback “to and from Kean’s Swamp and Sofala, twice a week". The successful contractor was Michael Moore of Kean's Swamp. In April 1863 the Sydney mail coach between Bowenfels and Cudgegong was held up and robbed by two bushrangers at Cherrytree Hill, two and a half miles from Kean's Swamp. The robbers were pursued by constables Wright and Cleary, who were stationed at Kean's Swamp. The policemen finally captured one of the men near Capertee Camp (now Capertee).

In March 1868 it was officially notified that the post-office previously known as Kean's Swamp would henceforth “bear the designation of ‘Ilford’”.

In June 1874 a visitor to Ilford described the township as being “in a most picturesque situation, at the foot of a mountain”. There were four stores in the settlement (of which Mrs. Phelps’ store incorporated the Post Office) and an inn called The Plough. The only place of worship was a stone-built Wesleyan church. The public school was described as a “miserable slab building”. By November 1875 there were two places of worship in Ilford, Episcopalian and Wesleyan, and the township had “a population of 100”. The buildings in the village were “neat and substantial”, the businesses consisting of “two stores, a public-house, a carpenter’s shop, a bakery, a butchery, and a post-office”. The original school-house was replaced in late 1877 or early 1878, after the foundation stone for the new building was laid in September 1877.

In November 1880 the following were granted publican's licenses at Ilford: Mrs. Elizabeth Donovan for the Carriers' Arms and Robert Moore for The Plough Inn. At the 1881 census Ilford village had 162 inhabitants. In November 1883 the publican's license held by John Farry for The Plough Inn at Ilford was cancelled by the Rylstone Licensing Court for the reason that Farry had “abandoned the said premises as his usual place of abode”. In 1884 John Guthrie held the publican's license for the Carriers' Arms.

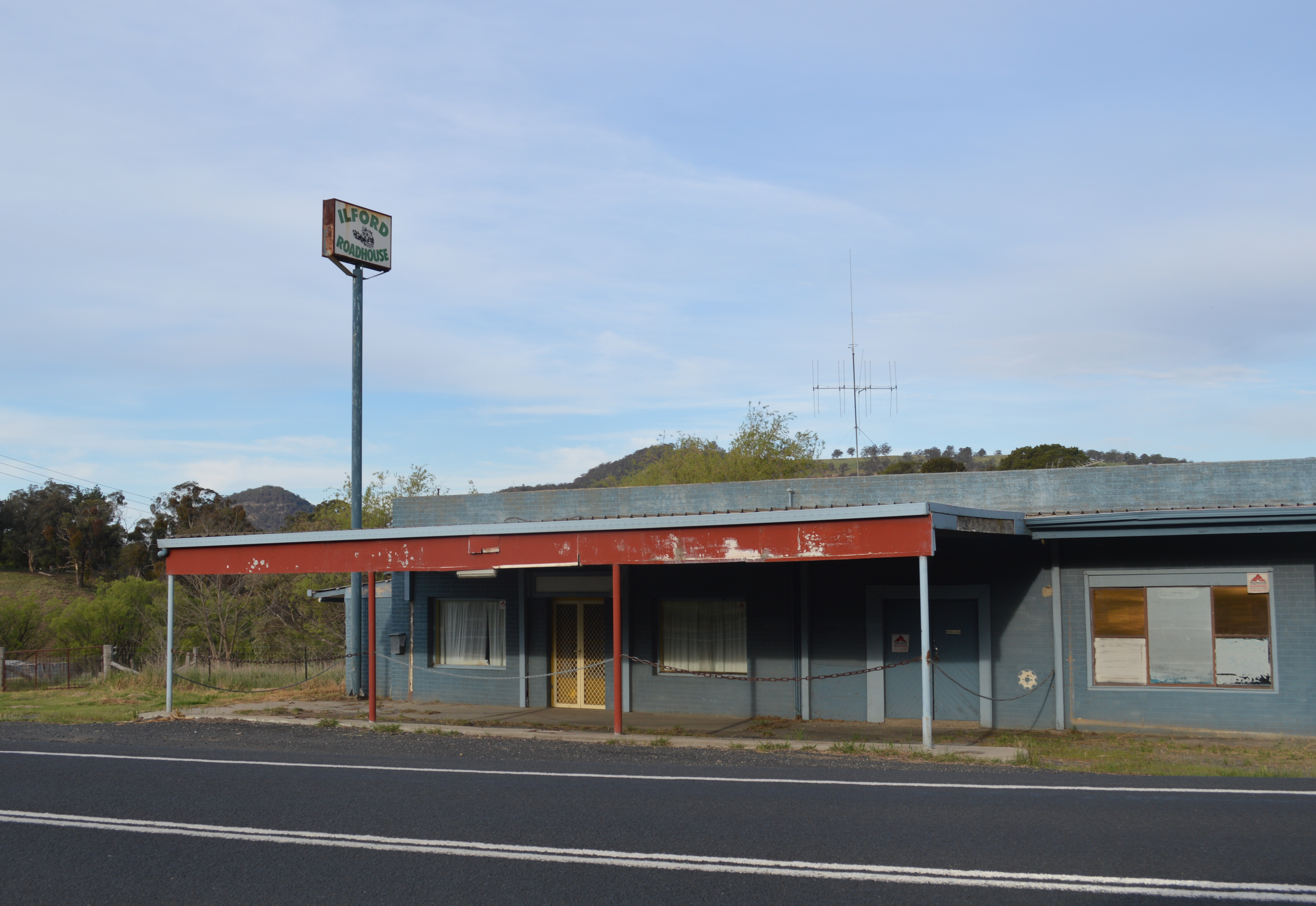
The former Ilford Roadhouse (photographed in 2015).

In June 1884 the railway branch line connecting Capertee to Wallerawang was extended through to Rylstone. The railway extension by-passed Ilford village to the east, but did, however, include a station named Ilford, even though it was located eight miles north-east of the village. The Ilford station had been completed by February 1884 when a correspondent made the observation that “the Ilford station house… seems too pretentious for the likely public requirements there”. The physical distance between the settlement of Ilford on the Sydney Road and the Ilford railway station was a significant factor in the steady decline of Ilford village from the mid-1880s. The railway station was named Ilford until 1900, when it was renamed Mornington. Three years later it was briefly renamed Carwell and then renamed Clandulla in 1905. The railway station (now closed) is the location of the modern village of Clandulla.

At the 1891 census Ilford village had 92 inhabitants. In April 1898 it was reported that “almost all the children” of the Ilford locality were “suffering from scarlet fever, and the epidemic shows no sign of abating”. At the 1901 census Ilford village had 71 inhabitants.

In 1909 Harriet Guthrie held the publican's license for the Carriers' Arms at Ilford.

A visitor to Ilford in July 1922 described the settlement as “a place of the past, one of the towns of the old carrying days... like all roadside towns that were built up with team traffic the railway has killed it”. Many of the houses in the village had “gone to decay, their roofs of shingles dropping off in patches” and a “deserted” police station. Still remaining was “an up-to-date store kept by Mr. Olliver” and a "rabbit works, the product of which goes to Sydney via Capertee”. Ilford “evidently boasted three or four little hotels, now there is none”. The local school-house was described as “a fine public building with a sadly depleted attendance roll of children”.

A “new co-operative sawmill” commenced work at Ilford in July 1926, run by the Ilford Co-operative Sawmilling Society Ltd. The local Co-operative Society was declared bankrupt in 1931 and was dissolved in May 1932.

== Farmhouse rental program ==
Ilford was one of several rural New South Wales townships to initiate a farmhouse rental program, offering farmhouses for rent for one dollar per week to attract new residents to the area. The program is not currently operating.

== Astronomy ==
The Astronomical Society of New South Wales runs a property 'Wiruna' just outside Ilford, which is one of the country's premier dark-sky observing sites, used by the society's members and guests. Each year since 1993, the Society has hosted the "South Pacific Star Party" there. This event attracts between 200 and 400 amateur star-gazers from Australia and abroad, effectively doubling the population of the region for the weekend. It is also used as a fund-raising opportunity for the local Scouts who provide hot food.

== Access ==
- From Capertee travel along Castlereagh Highway (Sydney Road).
- From Mudgee travel along Castlereagh Highway (Sydney Road).
- From Sofala travel along Bathurst-Ilford Road (MR 54).
- From Kandos travel along Bylong Valley Way to get to Castlereagh Highway (Sydney Road).

== See also ==
- Clandulla
- Sofala
- Mudgee
- Bathurst
