= Sofala, New South Wales =

Sofala
- Town
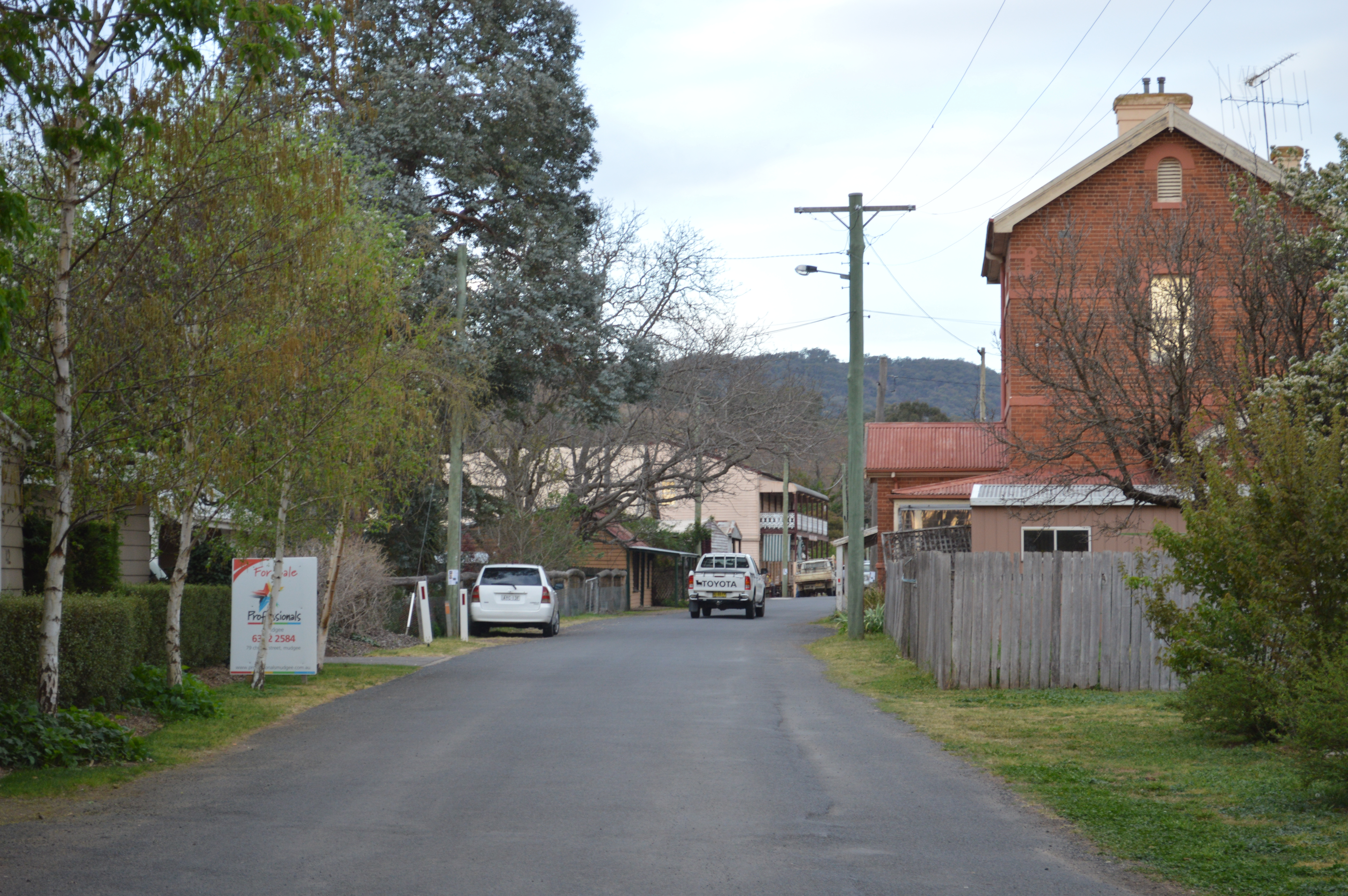
- Denison Street, the unusually narrow main street of Sofala

- Coordinates: 33°04′50″S 149°41′35″E
- Country: Australia
- State: New South Wales
- LGA: Bathurst Regional Council
- Location: 255 km (158 mi) NW of Sydney; 45 km (28 mi) N of Bathurst

Government
  - State electorate: Bathurst
  - Federal division: Calare

Population
  - Total: 111 (2021 census)

Sofala is a village in New South Wales, Australia, 255 kilometres (158 mi) north-west of Sydney, within Bathurst Regional Council. It is located beside the Turon River. Sofala is situated near the Bathurst-Ilford Road; only local traffic typically travels through the town. At the 2021 census, Sofala had a population of 111.

== History ==
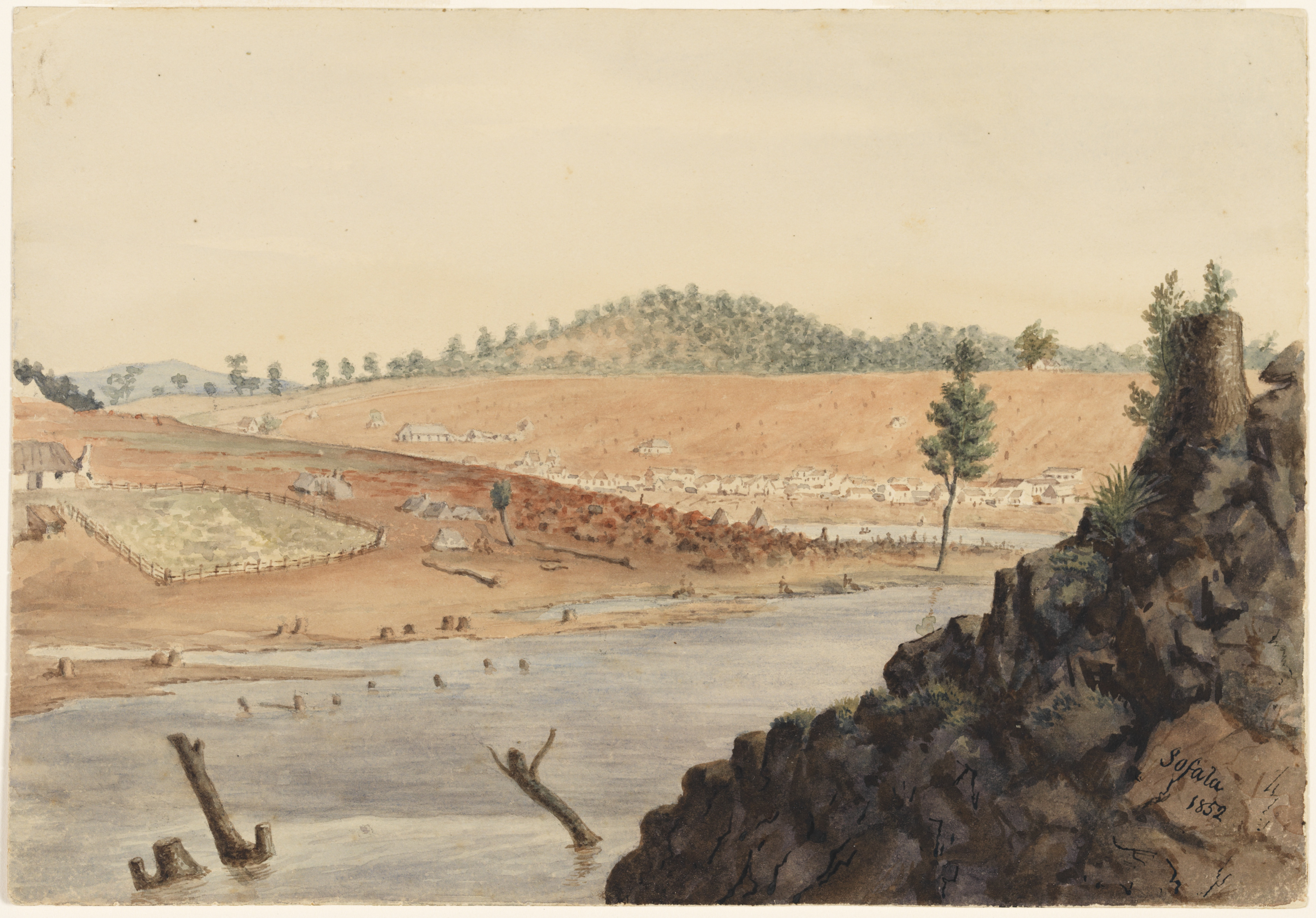
Sofala Gold Field, New South Wales, 1852

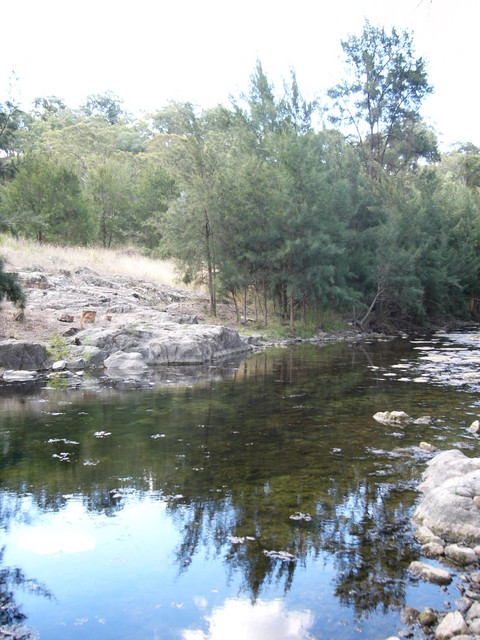
Turon River Near Sofala

Sofala came about as a direct result of the gold rush which had been triggered when Edward Hargraves discovered gold at Summerhill Creek on 12 February 1851. By June of that year, thousands of people had set up mining operations in the valley, and both the Royal Hotel and a general store were built in 1851 to handle the increased demand. Initially, gold was found in the area known as Gold Point on the Turon River. When the alluvial gold ran out, activity switched to quartz reef mining. The town was a centre of opposition to the gold licensing system in New South Wales at the time. A considerable number of the miners were Chinese.

Sofala Public School was established in 1878. There was an Anglican church, which was closed in 2019, and a Catholic convent. The Convent opened in 1872 and closed in 1909, although it was a church until 1970.

The Gas Hotel was one of the first two hotels licensed, in 1851. The Royal Hotel was established in 1862. There were two other hotels in 1866, the Sofala Inn and the Barley Mow. The Barley Mow had a Cobb & Co booking office.

Now a private residence, the Post and Telegraph Office, built in 1879, operated until 1989.

Contemporary attractions include the gold-rush-era Sofala Royal Hotel and the old gaol. Sofala is reportedly the oldest surviving gold-rush town in Australia. Small-scale gold workings are still active in the area, with prospectors using metal detectors, gold pans, and sluice boxes to recover small quantities of gold.

== Popular culture ==
Russell Drysdale's painting Sofala, a depiction of the main street of the town, won the Wynne Prize for 1947.

The 1974 Peter Weir film The Cars That Ate Paris was filmed in the town. Village scenes in the 1994 John Duigan film Sirens were also filmed in Sofala.

A noted business is Finglinna Studios, which supplies stained glass to churches and other public buildings.

== Access ==
- From Bathurst, Sofala is around 50 km north along the sealed Bathurst-Ilford Road from Sydney; around 30 km from Ilford.

== Heritage listings ==
Sofala has a number of heritage-listed sites, including:

- Brucedale, 1361 Sofala Road: Grave of Windradyne
- 216 Main Road, west of Sofala: Bridge over Turon River at Wallaby Rocks
- The Gold Commissioner's Residence, 11 Denison Street Sofala:

== Attractions ==
- Prospecting
- Authentic Gold Rush era establishments

e.g The Sofala Royal Hotel (est.1862)

- Walk along the Turon River
- Cycle
- Historical walks and tours
- Riverside campsites
- Old Gaol museum/café/accommodation

== See also ==
- Hester Maclean
- Hill End
- Ilford
- Capertee
- Bathurst
- Australian gold rushes
- Gold mining
