= Merriwa railway line =

Railway line in New South Wales, Australia

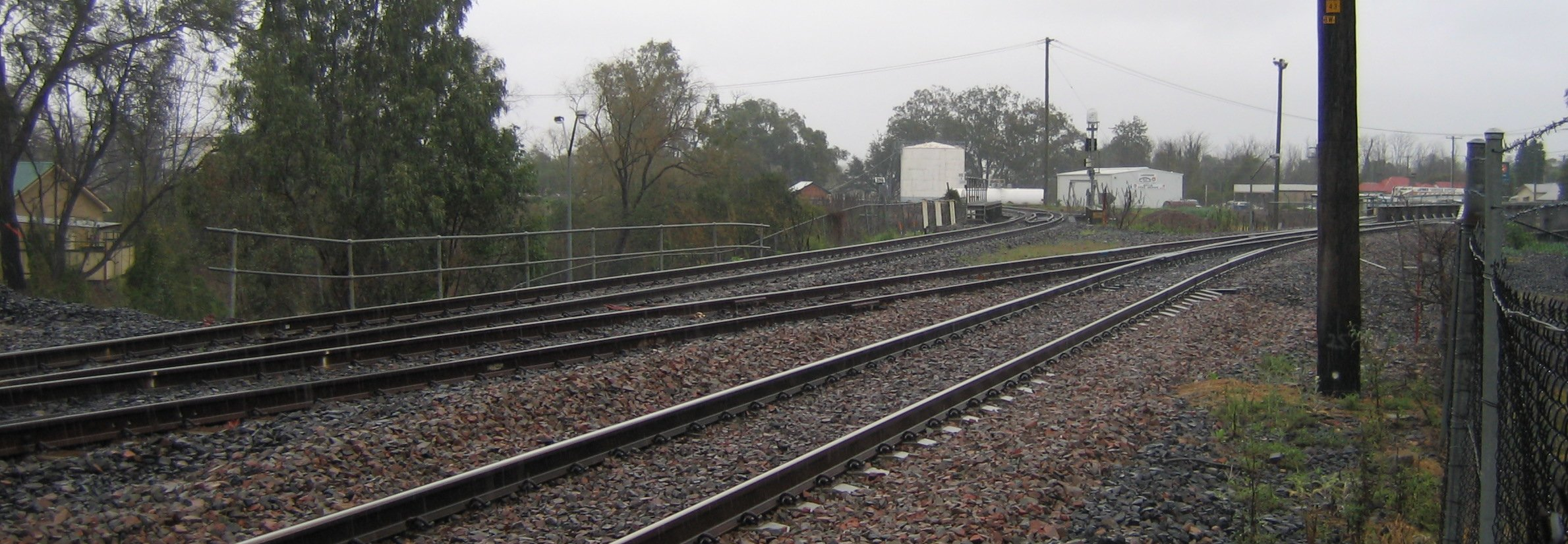
Merriwa railway line branching left off the Main North line at Muswellbrook

The Merriwa railway line in the Hunter Valley of northern New South Wales, Australia, branches from the Main North line at Muswellbrook and travels south west to Denman then generally north west through Sandy Hollow to Merriwa, a distance of approximately 80 kilometres (50 mi). The line opened to Denman on 26 April 1915, and to Merriwa on 29 October 1917. CPH railmotor operated passenger service ceased on 7 July 1973.

The first 38 kilometres was rebuilt to main line standards in the early 1980s as part of the construction of the Sandy Hollow - Gulgong railway line. The section north west of Sandy Hollow closed with the last grain train hauled by four 48 class locomotives running on 8 May 1987. The Merriwa line was severed at on 11 December 1996.

There are three mines, Bengalla and Mount Pleasant, just south west and west of Muswellbrook and Mangoola, half way to Denman with balloon loops of this line and a number of passing sidings have been built with the traffic to/from the three mines at Ulan.

== Restoration of Sandy Hollow to Merriwa section ==
A small group tried to form a preservation society (which was to be called Merriwa Railway Museum) to restore the station and goods shed to their original condition, as well as the railway yard including the historic steam era turntable and steam locomotive water column. The aim was to restore the line and have a steam locomotive run on it again using historic New South Wales Government Railways rolling stock. It was intended for tourists and train enthusiasts alike. This group was started in early 2002 but failed to progress.

A new railway society, The Merriwa Railway Society Incorporated (MRS), was officially launched in Merriwa on 24 October 2009, with more than 42 locals and rail enthusiasts in attendance. Consultation has been undertaken with Upper Hunter Shire Council, the Australian Rail Track Corporation and the Independent Transport Safety and Reliability Regulator.

Since August 2009, the intentions and plans of MRS have been reported in five regional and Sydney based newspapers and on the ABC Upper Hunter radio station, increasing local residents' awareness of the heritage railway restoration plans. Of recent times the appearance of the station has improved with painting.

== Gallery ==
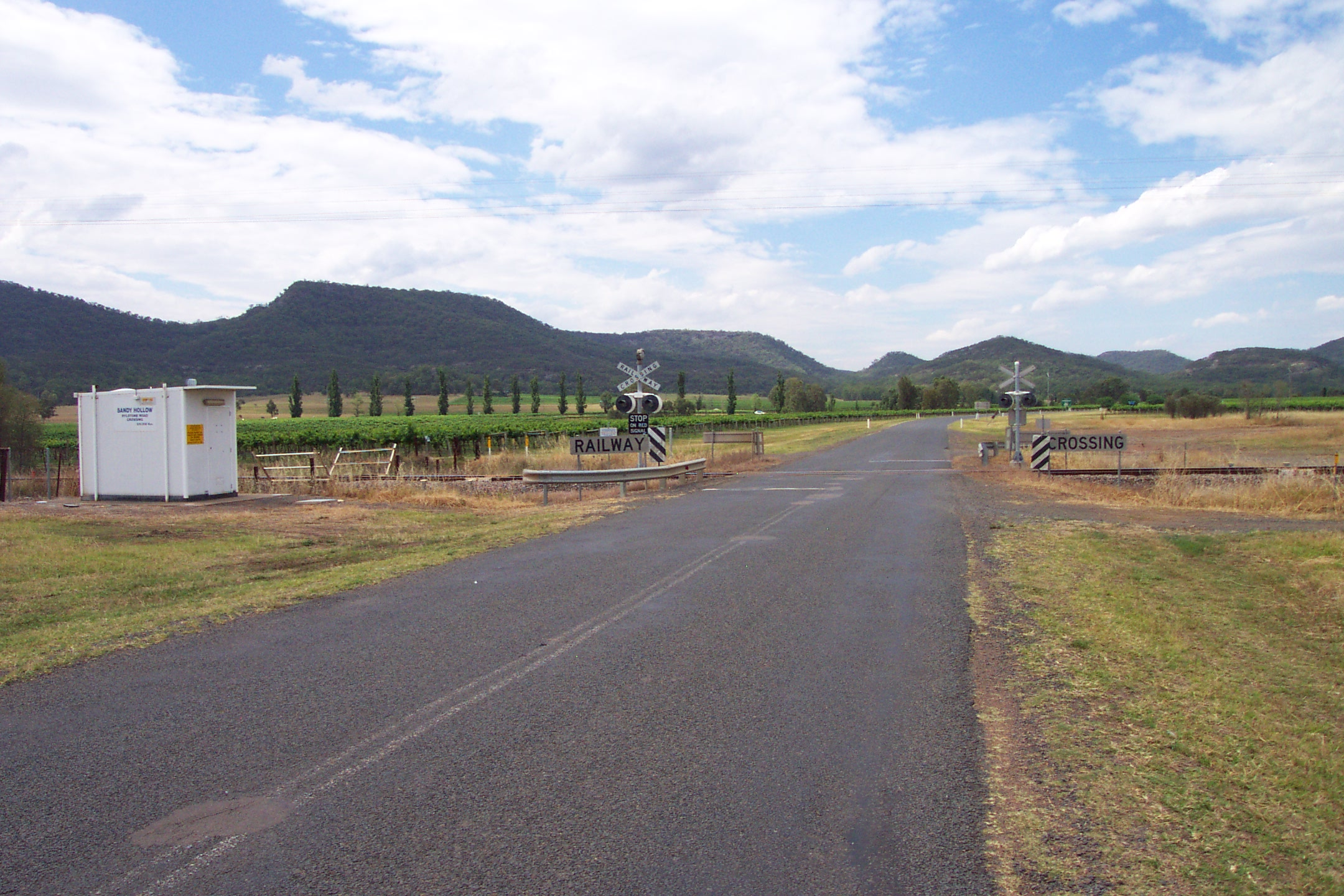
Level crossing where the railway line crosses Bylong Valley Way near Sandy Hollow

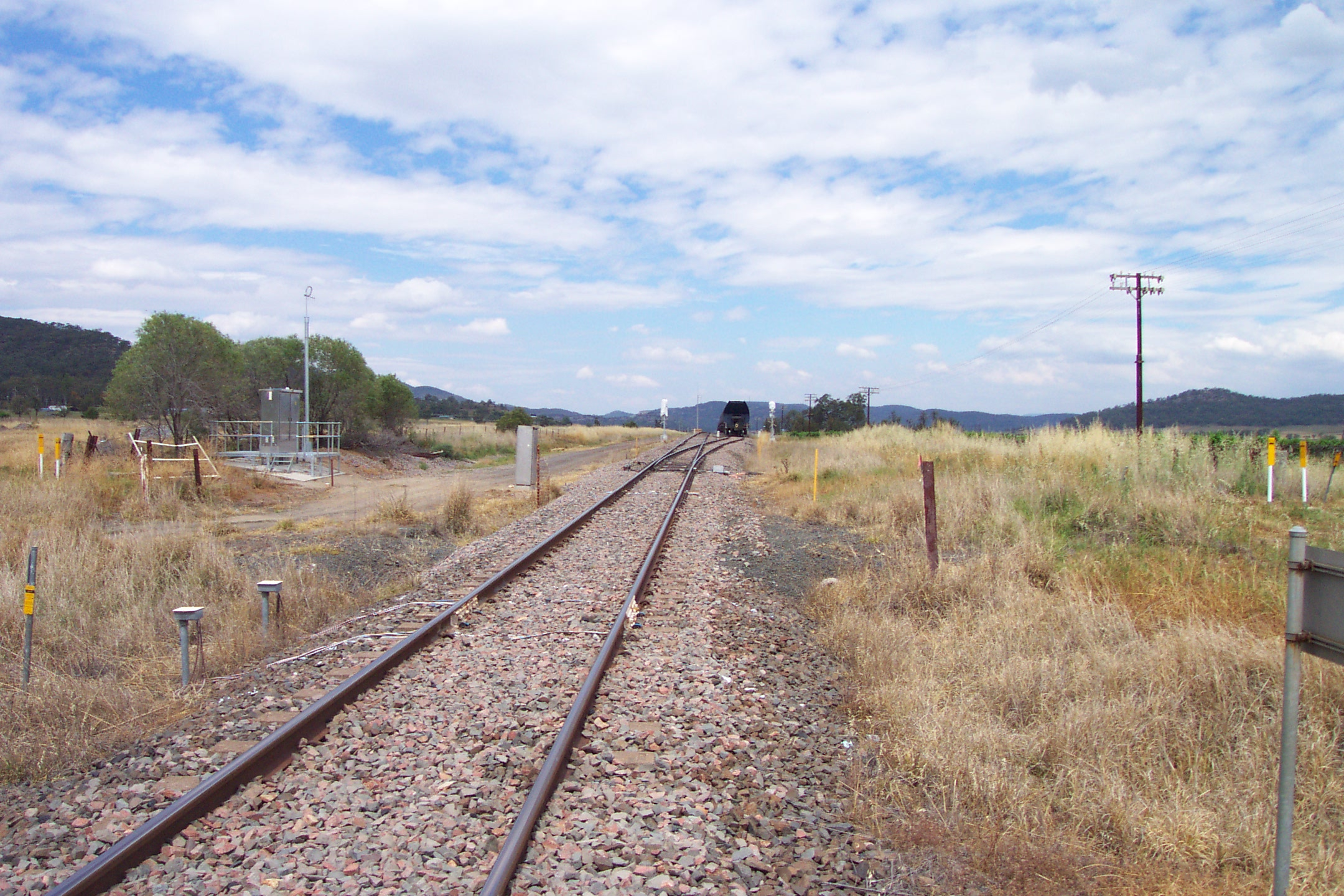
Looking east along the railway line from level crossing on Bylong Valley Way near Sandy Hollow, showing rear end of train waiting on crossing loop

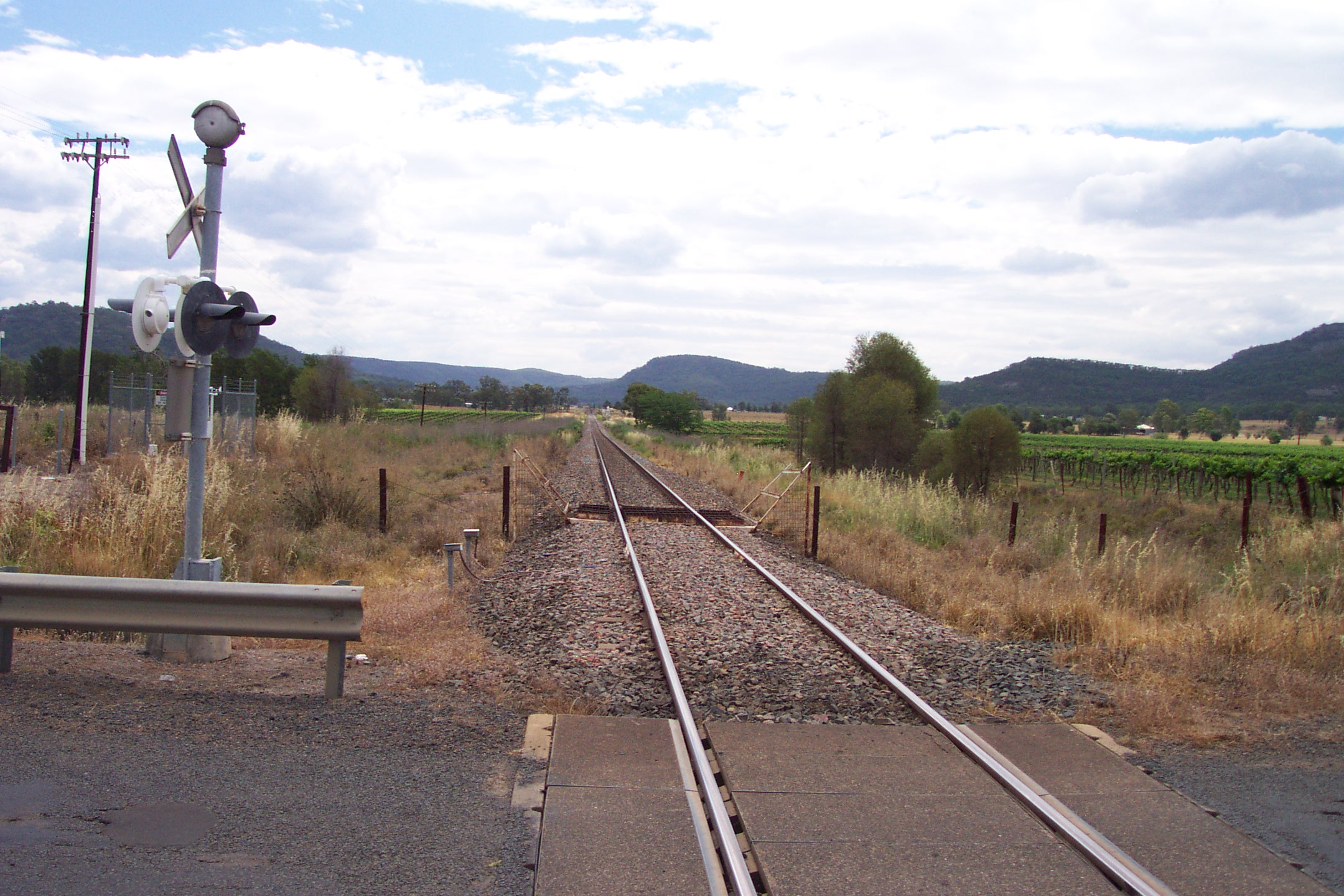
Looking west along the railway line towards Sandy Hollow from level crossing on Bylong Valley Way
