= Maryvale, New South Wales =

Maryvale
- Town
- Coordinates: 32°28′26″S 148°54′25″E
- Country: Australia
- State: New South Wales
- LGA: Dubbo Regional Council

Government
  - State electorate: Dubbo
  - Federal division: Parkes

Population
  - Total: 190 (SAL 2021)
- Postcode: 2820
- County: Gordon
- Parish: Loombah

Maryvale is a locality in Dubbo Regional Council, New South Wales, Australia.

== Railway ==
Maryvale once had a station on the Main Western line and a railway was proposed between Maryvale Triangular Junction (located at 32°26′32.7″S 148°53′59.7″E, 3.75 kilometres (2.33 mi) north of Maryvale station) and Sandy Hollow on the Merriwa Branch Railway Line as part of a railway linking Dubbo and western New South Wales to Newcastle.

Only the Sandy Hollow–Gulgong section has been completed as part of Ulan Mine Rail Link to Newcastle, although most of the earthworks, culverts, bridge abutments and so on and Tunnel No 5 of 5 on the Sandy Hollow to Maryvale Triangular or Y Junction section(located at 32°23′04.7″S 149°12′26″E) were built on the section between Gulgong and Maryvale between 1937 and 1951.
