= Ulan, New South Wales =

Ulan New South Wales
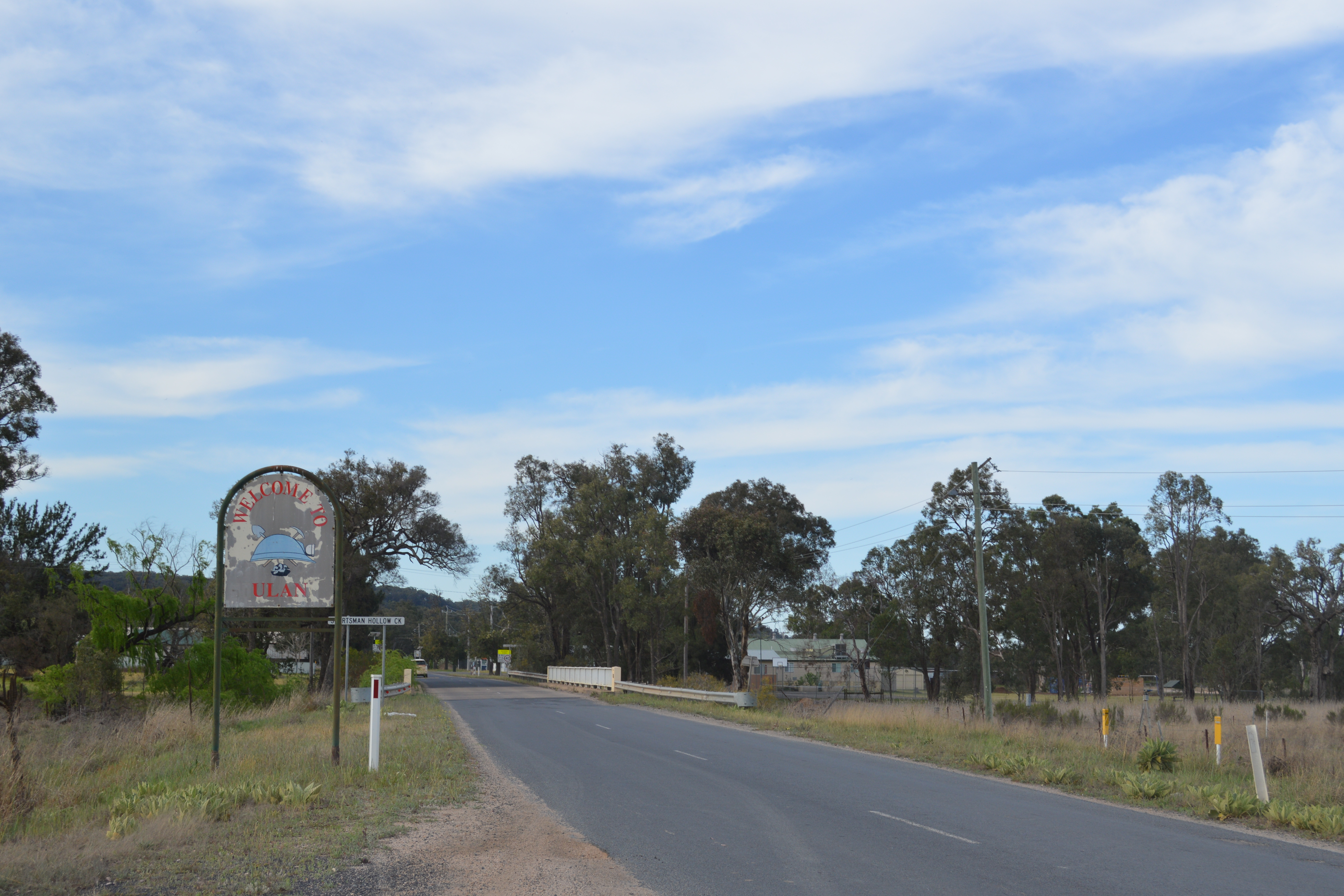
- Entering Ulan

- Coordinates: 32°17′S 149°44′E
- Population: 81 (SAL 2021)
- Postcode(s): 2850
- Location: 312 km (194 mi) NW of Sydney; 198 km (123 mi) N of Orange; 41 km (25 mi) N of Mudgee; 25 km (16 mi) NW of Gulgong
- LGA(s): Mid-Western Regional Council
- State electorate(s): Upper Hunter
- Federal division(s): Parkes

Ulan is a small village in eastern New South Wales, Australia. Ulan Post Office opened on 1 September 1893.

There is a coal mine at Ulan. The Sandy Hollow - Ulan Railway was built to serve this coal mine. In exchange for additional coal leases, the coal company extended the railway for 20 km to connect with other railway lines at Gulgong thus forming an improved alternate route crossing the Great Dividing Range at a lower altitude with improved gradients.

Ulan is situated on the edges of the Sydney basin.

== Ulan railway station ==
Preceding station	Former services	Following station
Gulgong Terminus	Sandy Hollow–Gulgong Line	Akuna towards Sandy Hollow
