= Wyaldra Creek railway bridge, Gulgong =

Wyaldra Creek railway bridge (former)
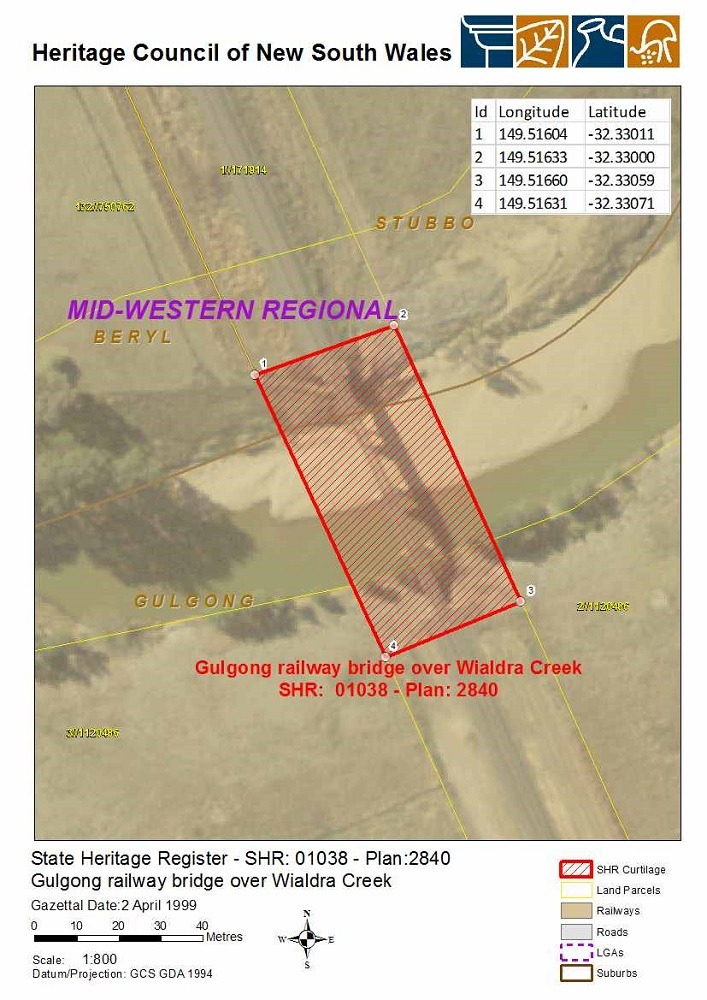
- Heritage boundaries
- Coordinates: 32°19′49″S 149°30′59″E
- Carried: Gwabegar railway line
- Crossed: Wyaldra Creek
- Locale: Gulgong, Mid-Western Regional Council, New South Wales, Australia
- Official name: Gulgong railway bridge over Wialdra Creek
- Owner: Transport Asset Manager of New South Wales

Characteristics
- Longest span: 12.2 metres (40 ft)
- No. of spans: 3

Rail characteristics
- No. of tracks: One
- Track gauge: 4 ft 8 1/2 in (1,435 mm) standard gauge

History
- Construction end: December 1909
- Opened: December 1910
- Collapsed: 1987 (demolished)

New South Wales Heritage Register
- Official name: Gulgong railway bridge over Wialdra Creek
- Type: State heritage (built)
- Designated: 2 April 1999
- Reference no.: 1038
- Type: Railway Bridge/Viaduct
- Category: Transport – Rail

Location
- Interactive map of Wyaldra Creek railway bridge (former)

The Wyaldra Creek railway bridge is a heritage-listed former railway bridge that carried the Gwabegar railway line across the Wyaldra Creek at Gulgong, in the Mid-Western Regional Council local government area of New South Wales, Australia. The property was owned by Transport Asset Manager of New South Wales, an agency of the Government of New South Wales. It was added to the New South Wales State Heritage Register on 2 April 1999.

The bridge was demolished in 1987.

== History ==
The bridge was built in 1909 as part of the extension of the railway from Gulgong to Dunedoo. The construction of the bridge was reported to be the main challenge for the contractors building the extension. Numerous difficulties were experienced sinking the bridge cylinders "through the drift sand to a very hard and uneven basalt at the bottom of the creek", and progress was slow, but it was completed by December 1909. The Dunedoo extension was formally opened in December 1910.

== Description ==
The bridge carried a single-track 4 ft 8 1/2 in (1,435 mm) standard gauge railway on an open deck (with transomes). It spans were 4.3 metres (14 ft), 7.3 metres (24 ft), three at 12.2 metres (40 ft), 7.3 metres (24 ft) and 4.3 metres (14 ft). The four shorter approach spans were timber girders. The three 12.2 metres (40 ft) spans were timber trusses of the Howe-type with timber compression diagonals, vertical tension rods and six bays. The piers were timber on concrete bases; at least some of the piers were sheeted.

The bridge was demolished in 1987.

== Heritage listing ==
The Wyaldra Creek railway bridge was listed on the New South Wales State Heritage Register on 2 April 1999.

== See also ==
- List of railway bridges in New South Wales
