= Hobsons Shops =

Heritage-listed retail building in New South Wales, Australia

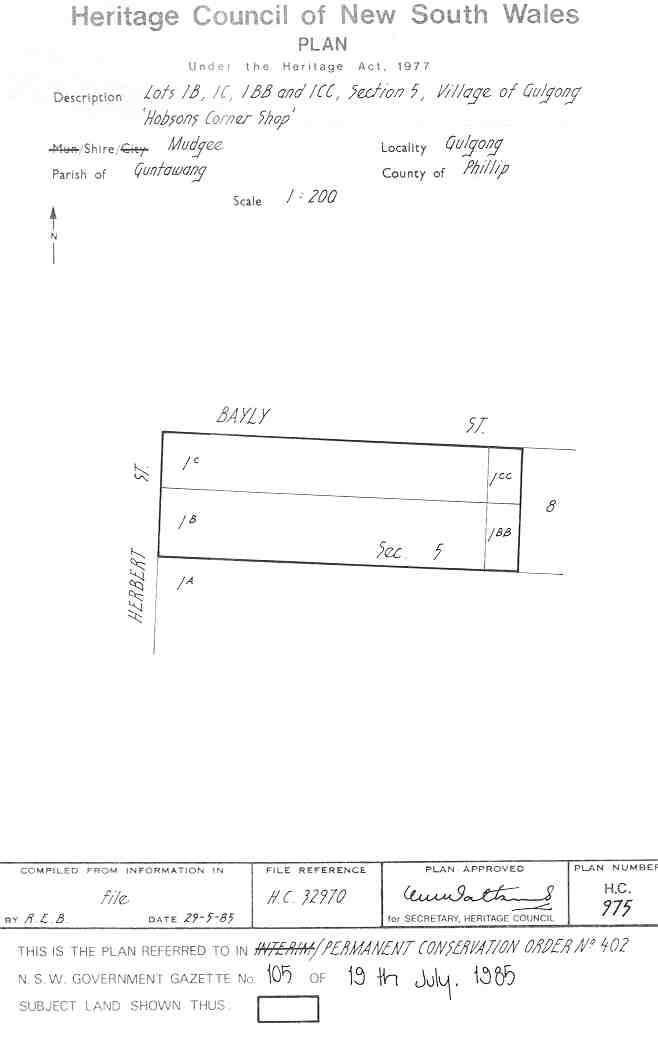
- Heritage boundaries

- Location within New South Wales Location within Australia
- 32.3616°S 149.5340°E
- Location: 75 Herbert Street, Gulgong, Mid-Western Regional Council, New South Wales, Australia

New South Wales Heritage Register
- Official name: Hobsons Shops Golden West Trading Post
- Type: state heritage (built)
- Designated: 2 April 1999
- Reference no.: 402
- Type: Shop
- Category: Retail and Wholesale

Hobsons Shops is a heritage-listed retail building at 75 Herbert Street, Gulgong, in the Central West region of New South Wales, Australia. It was added to the New South Wales State Heritage Register on 2 April 1999.

== Description ==
It consists of two shops dating from c. 1880 on the corner of Herbert Street and Bayly Street. It was operating as an old wares business, the Golden West Trading Post, when the building was granted a permanent conservation order in 1985, and is alternatively referred to by this name in various documents.

== Heritage listing ==
Hobsons Shops was listed on the New South Wales State Heritage Register on 2 April 1999.
