= Yarrobil National Park =

National park in New South Wales, Australia

- IUCN category II (national park)
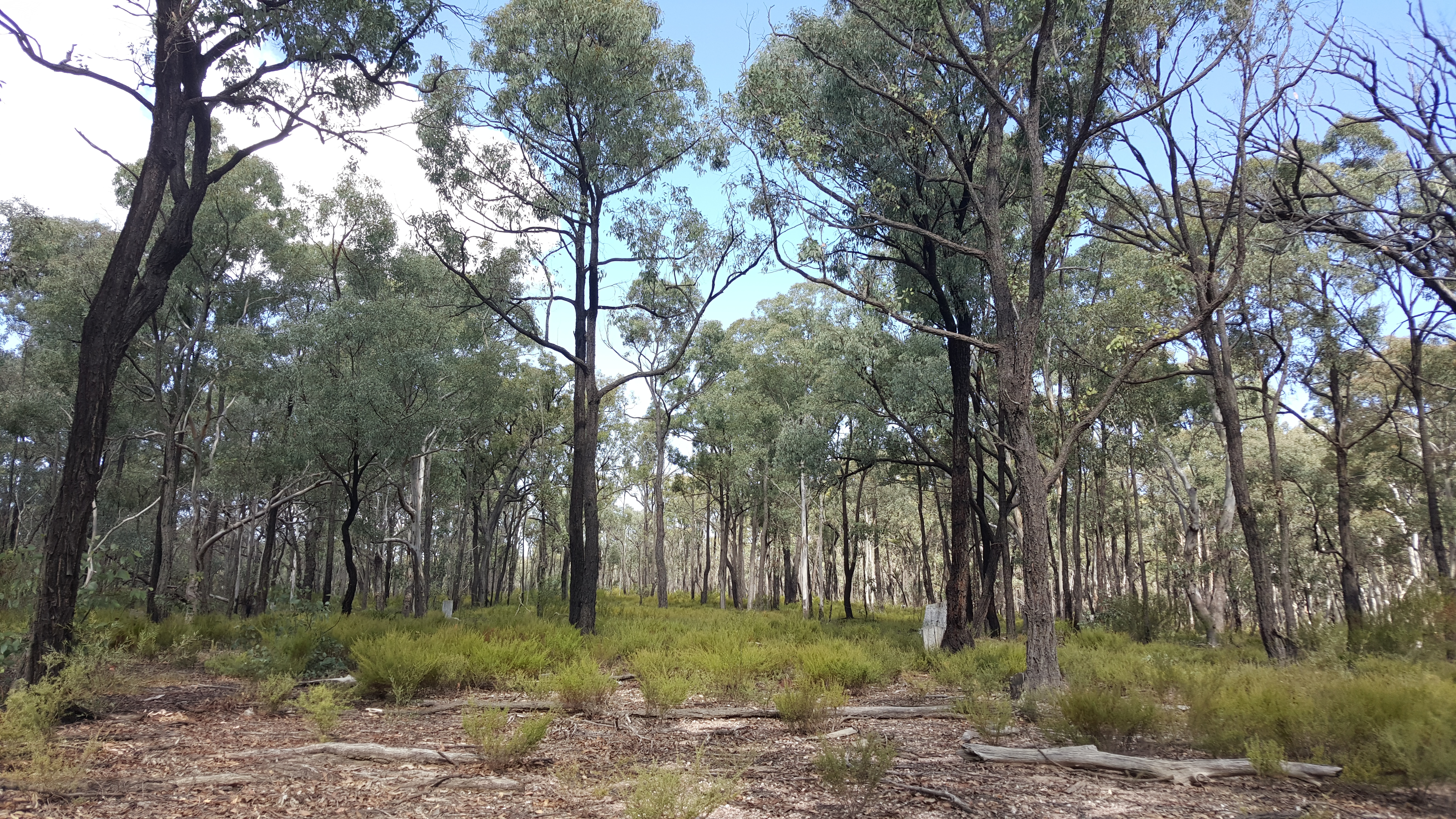
- woodland, two years post fire

- Location within New South Wales
- Location: New South Wales
- Nearest city: Gulgong
- Coordinates: 32°17′56.4″S 149°22′12″E
- Area: 13.22 km^{2} (5.10 sq mi)
- Established: 2005
- Governing body: National Parks and Wildlife Service (New South Wales)
- Website: Official website

Yarrobil National Park is located in New South Wales, Australia. It is located 21 kilometres (13 mi) north west of Gulgong.

The park covers 1,322 hectares (3,270 acres) in three disconnected sections. It was previously a State forest and was converted to a national park in December 2005.

It is located at an altitude of 546 meters.
