= Gulgong railway station =

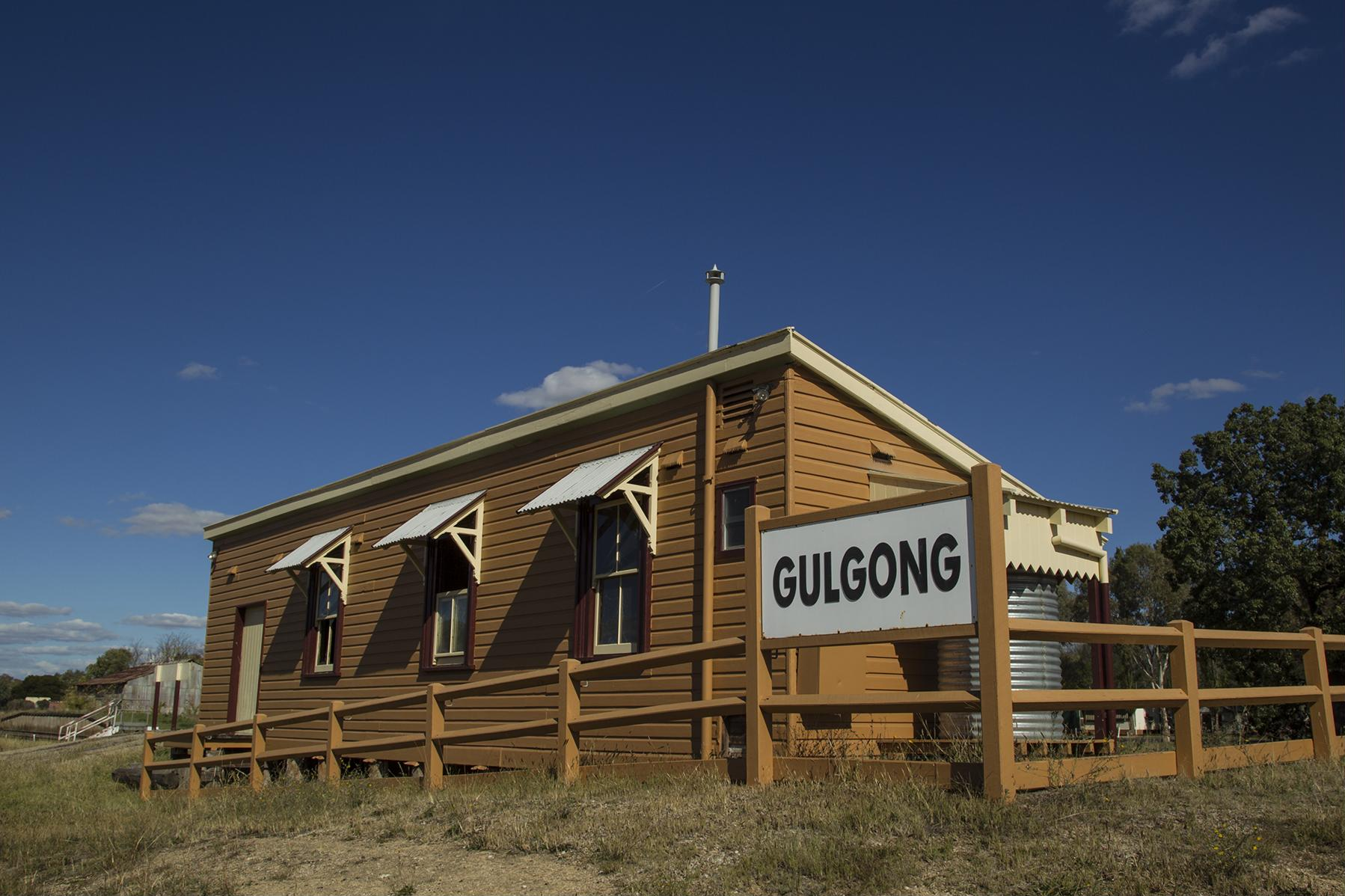

- Location within New South Wales Location within Australia
- 32.3565°S 149.5416°E
- Location: Wallerawang–Gwabegar railway, Gulgong, Mid-Western Regional Council, New South Wales, Australia

Site notes
- Owner: Transport Asset Manager of New South Wales

New South Wales Heritage Register
- Official name: Gulgong Railway Station and yard group
- Type: state heritage (built)
- Designated: 2 April 1999
- Reference no.: 1158
- Type: Railway Platform/Station
- Category: Transport – Rail

Gulgong railway station is a heritage-listed disused railway station on the Gwabegar railway line at Gulgong, New South Wales, Australia. The property was added to the New South Wales State Heritage Register on 2 April 1999.

== History ==
The Gulgong railway station opened on 14 April 1909 with the extension of the railway from Mudgee to Gulgong.

The rail passenger service to Gulgong ceased on 2 December 1985 and freight services connecting Gulgong and Kandos on the Gwabegar line ceased in 1992. The freight-only Sandy Hollow–Gulgong railway line still operates through Gulgong, connecting to a section of the Gwabegar line beyond Gulgong that still handles freight services.

The station building is now leased to the Mid-Western Regional Council.

== Description ==
The station complex consists of a timber station building in a type 7 design with a skillion roof and a timber-faced platform dating from 1909, along with a pump house and dam.

== Heritage listing ==
As Gulgong is an historic town with high tourist potential and the railway played a part in the development of the town, the remaining structures are significant in the overall development of the area. The structures are modest, unpretentious and consistent with pioneer type construction and the economy exercised in the building of new lines early in the new century. The structures were all built at the same time and retain a consistency of style. They are interesting in that no additional structures were placed on the site after the initial development so that the site represents a 1909 railway group.

Gulgong railway station was listed on the New South Wales State Heritage Register on 2 April 1999 having satisfied the following criteria.

The place possesses uncommon, rare or endangered aspects of the cultural or natural history of New South Wales.

This item is assessed as historically rare. This item is assessed as arch. rare. This item is assessed as socially rare.
