= The Greatest Wonder of the World and American Tobacco Warehouse and Fancy Goods Emporium =

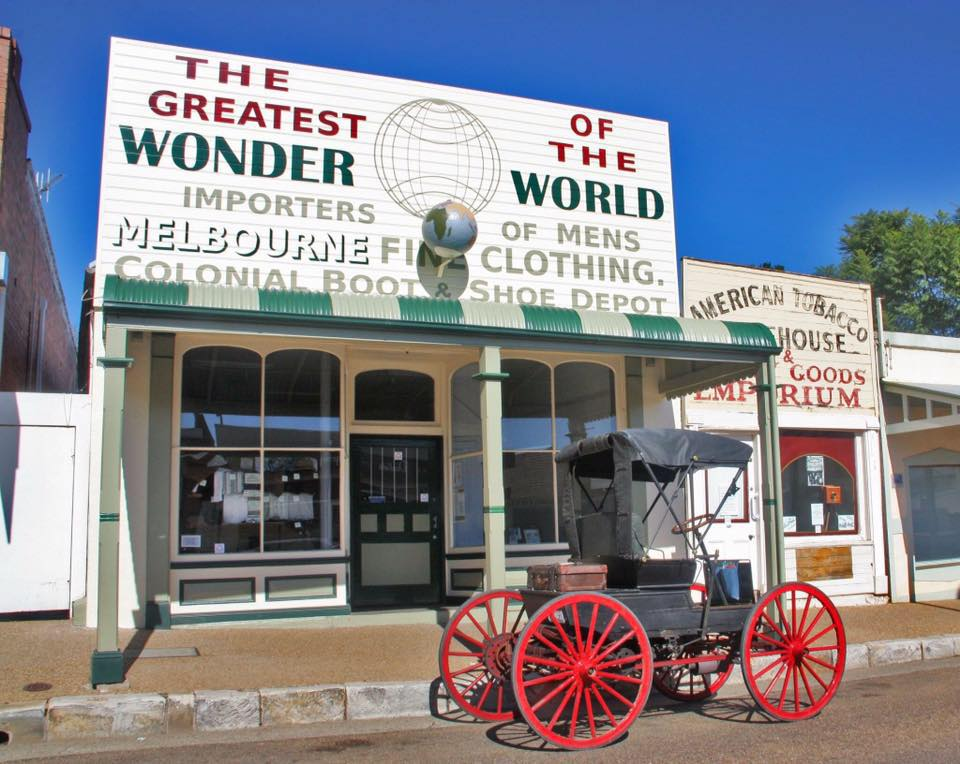

- Location within New South Wales Location within Australia
- 32.3628°S 149.5329°E
- Location: 123-125 Mayne Street, Gulgong, Mid-Western Regional Council, New South Wales, Australia

History
- Built: 1870–1878

Site notes
- Owner: Gulgong Holtermann Museum

New South Wales Heritage Register
- Official name: The Greatest Wonder of the World and American Tobacco Warehouse and Fancy Goods Emporium
- Type: state heritage (built)
- Designated: 21 October 2016
- Reference no.: 1983
- Type: Museum
- Category: Commercial
- Builders: Unknown

The Greatest Wonder of the World and American Tobacco Warehouse and Fancy Goods Emporium are heritage-listed adjacent shops at 123-125 Mayne Street, Gulgong, Mid-Western Regional Council, New South Wales, Australia. They were built from 1870 to 1878. They have been refurbished to house the Gulgong Holtermann Museum, with new galleries constructed at the back to house the UNESCO listed Holtermann collection. The original buildings were added to the New South Wales State Heritage Register on 21 October 2016.

== History ==
=== Gulgong and the gold rush ===
Tom Saunder, a local shepherd, located gold on the surface of Red Hill, now located in central Gulgong, on 14 April 1870 and reported his discovery to Sergeant O'Donnell at the police station at 2 Mile Flat. The news spread rapidly from there, and the first small rush began. By June 1870, 500 people had camped on the new diggings at Adam's Lead.

The SMH in its "Chronicles of Occurrence" in December 1870 encouraged the reader to 'now rush to Gulgong'! By January 1871 the population of the area had grown to 3,000. Other discoveries followed at other local leads such as Happy Valley, Caledonian and Canadian Leads and Home Rule, and by the end of 1872 there were 20,000 people on the Gulgong fields.

The alluvial leads in the district were among the richest in the State. Within the first four years of discovery, over 300 000 ounces of gold were recovered. The Gulgong Goldfield produced 275 000 pounds of gold, most of which was won from old stream gravels as much as 60m below the surface, several kilometres from Gulgong.

Due to its rapid development, Gulgong was initially a primitive community with quick timber construction predominating in the first years of the gold rush. The nationalities on the field like elsewhere in NSW were many and varied including Bulgarians, Greeks, Scottish, Americans, Canadians, Irish men and Chinese, as well as native-born Australians.

It was a long trip from Sydney, to Gulgong but the trip was worthwhile for hundreds of miners. They travelled by train from Sydney to Wallerawang, thence by mail coach to Mudgee, and from there by Tom Tarrant's coach or Cobb and Co or horseback."

By 1876 the boom had begun to wane and it was all but over by 1880. Consequently the once booming town was reduced to a village which went on to service local farmers and pastoralists.

=== The Buildings ===
The earliest building standing on the site today is the small timber and tin-lined American Tobacco Warehouse. The side wall of this structure is clad in such a way that indicates there was clear access from the side that now contains The Greatest Wonder. The original Greatest Wonder building was also standing in February 1871, as declared in an advertisement of that period and captured in a historic photograph by Henry Beaufoy Merlin in 1872. This building was originally a roughly built timber framed structure that only stood for a few years, and was rebuilt a few years later under the ownership of Robert Robinson.

==== The Greatest Wonder of the World ====
The "Greatest Wonder of the World" was opened by Simeon Moses, an importer of men's clothing, including the Colonial Boot & Shoe Depot. Simeon was the proprietor.

When Simeon Moses planned to leave Gulgong at the end of 1873 he held a sale. Moses left Gulgong to take over the Royal Hotel in Mudgee, and the Greatest Wonder of the World was taken over by another brother, Abraham Moses. However, this was short-lived and notice was given that the furniture of the Greatest Wonder was to be sold up on 14 July 1874. A week later on 21 July a notice in the Gulgong Evening Argus noted that the business of Clothier, Boot and Shoe Manufacture, and the liquidation of liabilities and debts was to pass to Abraham.

The Greatest Wonder Of the World store was offered for sale on the 13 March 1875 .

'The Splendid Freehold Property at the establishment of the GREATEST WONDER OF THE WORLD, Queen Street. The property contains sufficient rooms, double lined and papered, suitable for a nice snug hotel, with kitchen and servant's room, bathroom and pantry, well fitted up. For a business site it cannot be surpassed. The allotment is full depth, facing the Telegraph Office and Court House at the back. This central property will be sold a bargain. Apply to A. Moses Queen Street.'

An auction notice appeared 3 months later on 5 June, to be sold on the 9 June by Plunkett & Co. The former Greatest Wonder was sold to Robert Robinson. When Robert Robinson bought this building from Moses it was said he renovated or rebuilt it, to create a new post office. However, before the building could take up the role as Post Office, the Government of New South Wales ordered the Post Office to be moved to the Telegraph Station in the Police Compound. It appears that the renovations were extensive. Full width windows were added across the main street facade, the parapeted rectangular gable was removed and rear and side walls were constructed of stone. Robinson sold the improved shop to Samuel Bishop in 1880.

The American Tobacco Warehouse and Fancy Goods Emporium building was sold to Paul Harford in 1879 then to Charles Zimmler in 1883.

Samuel Bishop was a prominent Gulgong resident, working as an auctioneer and land agent and later serving as Town Clerk and Inspector of Works and sextant of the local cemetery. Following his purchase of the Greatest Wonder building, he used the premises as a bookseller and stationer for the next two or more decades.

Behind the two shop-front timber buildings, the Greatest Wonder and the American Tobacco Warehouse, stood an old timber-framed house with various later additions. It appears that the first room of this house predated the present stone walls of the "Greatest Wonder " store, and possibly dates from c. 1876. Rates notices provide names of "occupiers" of this land from that date, and the initial small single roomed cottage, with an end wall fireplace was probably the home of Samuel Trevenen Bishop. The house was a family home and there is evidence that two Bishop daughters were born there.

Samuel Bishop died at Gulgong in 1915 while still the owner of the Mayne Street shop. His son-in-law, William Christian, became the new owner of the shop and ran a watchmaker and jewellery business there from 1934. Christian and his wife returned to Gulgong in 1933 after an sbence of many years.

==== American Tobacco Warehouse and Fancy Goods Emporium ====
Menser Moses, the brother of Simeon Moses, operated the American Tobacco Warehouse and Fancy Goods Emporium next door. The building was sold to Paul Harford in 1879 then to another Gulgong figure, Charles Zimmler, in 1883.

=== Holtermann Collection ===
Bernhard Otto Holtermann came to Australia in 1858 from Hamburg. Initially employed as a waiter, Holtermann met Polish miner, Ludwig Beyers and the pair travelled to Hill End and began prospecting in 1861. Due to their lack of success Holtermann had to find work where he could and by 1868 he was the licensee of the All Nations Hotel but he and Beyers still had a claim worked by hired hands. In October the night-shift workers found the world's largest gold bearing reef material in goldfield. Holtermann was a rich man. He went on to live in St Leonards and became a member of the Legislative Assembly for St Leonards.

While he was in Hill End, Holtermann had met photographers, Henry Beaufoy Merlin and Charles Bayliss. After he found the "Holtermann Nugget", Holtermann assisted the pair in their work by funding their project of creating a photographic documentation of the settled areas of NSW.

These photographs included Hill End and the Gulgong goldfields and they constitute a detailed and significant record of life on the gold fields. They were first exhibited at the Mitchell Library in Sydney in March 1953. The collection included many scenes of goldfields life during the height of the early rush in the early 1870s. Many of the buildings included in the street scenes at Gulgong and Hill End have disappeared.

Several of the photographs in the Holtermann collection were displayed at international exhibitions in Philadelphia and Paris where they won awards. The collection disappeared from view by the turn of the century. The collection of glass negatives resurfaced in a private home in the early 1950s. The photographs were exhibited in 1953 after almost 70 years.

Among the Gulgong buildings photographed by Merlin and Bayliss was the "Greatest Wonder of the World" and the "American Tobacco Company", capturing the Moses brothers outside their stores during their ownership. These photographs are commemorated in the Gulgong Holtermann Museum, which now operates out of the buildings.

=== Gulgong Holtermann Museum ===
The buildings were refurbished in the 1970s, but subsequently fell into disrepair. They were then acquired for the new Gulgong Holtermann Museum, which would display the UNESCO-listed Holtermann Collection in which the buildings feature. The project was launched in the existing buildings in January 2015. The buildings subsequently underwent restoration, with attempts to return the facade to its appearance at the time of the Holtermann photographs. Stage 1 of the restoration was completed in May 2016. Three new multi-function pavilions were built behind the original buildings from 2015 to 2019. The museum officially opened on 26 October 2019.

== Description ==
The two goldrush era commercial buildings have gabled iron roofs, timber framed shop fronts. They both were constructed as timber framed and clad with corrugated iron lined buildings.

The American Tobacco Warehouse and Fancy Goods Emporium remains in its original state, with the original rectangular parapet containing the name of the store. It presents to the street as it did when photographed by Merlin in 1872. This shop has a large shop area at the front with doorway access to the street and a large showcase window. To the rear of the shop space is a small space opening to the back yard.

The American Tobacco building appears to have been the first constructed, and retains much of its original fabric.

The Greatest Wonder store was largely rebuilt in 1876 when, as the town grew and became more prosperious the owner upgraded the building with the aim of it becoming the town's post office. The timber and corrugated walls were replaced with rubble stone walls and brick quoining. Full windows front the street on both side of the central doorway. The parapeted gable was removed and a bull nose verandah added to the street facade.

Behind two shop fronted buildings there was a timber-framed house the first room of which predated the stone wall at the rear of the shop. This was the one room cottage of owner Samuel Trevenen Bishop. This structure no longer stands.

The buildings were in fair to good condition as at 2 March 2016.

== Heritage listing ==
The Greatest Wonder of the World and the American Tobacco Warehouse and Fancy Goods Emporium are of state heritage significance as they demonstrate the impact of the gold rushes on the creation and development of towns and villages in NSW.

The state heritage significance of the two buildings is enhanced through their association with the Holtermann Collection of photographs, which provides a unique documentation of the development of the colony in the 1870s. Through the collection, the buildings have an historic association with Bernhard Otto Holtermann, a German gold miner, sponsor of the Holtermann Collection, entrepreneur and later Member of the Legislative Assembly.

The buildings have state level aesthetic significance as they are now rare and representative examples of rough, "erected-in-a-hurry" vernacular buildings, built to service the burgeoning gold rush population around Gulgong-one of the richest goldfields in NSW. The 1876 remodelling of "The Greatest Wonder of the World" is an example of the innovative reuse of a simple earlier structure as a more substantial building.

The buildings are also increasingly rare examples of still-standing goldfields buildings documented in the Holtermann Collection.

The Greatest Wonder of the World and American Tobacco Warehouse and Fancy Goods Emporium was listed on the New South Wales State Heritage Register on 21 October 2016 having satisfied the following criteria.

The place is important in demonstrating the course, or pattern, of cultural or natural history in New South Wales.

The Greatest Wonder of the World and the American Tobacco Warehouse and Fancy Goods Emporium are of state heritage significance as they demonstrate the impact of the gold rushes on the creation and development of towns and villages in NSW-Gulgong being one of the richest goldfield regions in the state. The pair of neighbouring buildings together demonstrate the way in which such gold towns began and developed as the gold finds increased the wealth of the population. Both buildings were built in the early years of the gold rush in Gulgong when commercial building were hurriedly thrown together to service the initial burgeoning gold rush population in the area. The American Tobacco Warehouse and Fancy Goods Emporium remains in its original state of construction and layout. The Greatest Wonder of the World was upgraded and remodelled in 1876 as the proprietor prospered from the gold rush economy and became established in the town. The building was rebuilt as a random stone constructed post office building, incorporating the original layout and some materials. This is a pattern settlement and construction typical of gold rush towns across NSW.

The place has a strong or special association with a person, or group of persons, of importance of cultural or natural history of New South Wales's history.

The Greatest Wonder of the World and the American Tobacco Warehouse and Fancy Goods Emporium are of state heritage significance for their association with the Holtermann Collection of photographs, and Bernhard Otto Holtermann himself. Holtermann was a German born gold miner and later businessman and politician. Holtermann, mining partner Ludwig Hugo Beyers and several others set up the Star of Hope Mining Company and, in 1872, a 286 kilogram "nugget" was discovered in the works. This was reputedly the largest piece of gold bearing material in the world.

The Holtermann Collection of photographs is a highly regarded collection of photographs of the settled areas of NSW taken in the last quarter of the nineteenth century, incorporating the mining towns of Gulgong, Hill End, Tambaroora and Home Rule. Financed by Holtermann, the collection documents the everyday life of these gold mining towns. The broader collection was used by the colonial government in international exhibitions, winning an award at the Paris Exhibition of 1878.

The buildings also have an important historic association with the Gulgong goldfield-one of the richest yielding goldfields in NSW.

The place is important in demonstrating aesthetic characteristics and/or a high degree of creative or technical achievement in New South Wales.

The Greatest Wonder of the World and the American Tobacco Warehouse and Fancy Goods Emporium are of state heritage significance for aesthetic values as now rare examples of rough, "erected-in-a-hurry" vernacular buildings built to service the burgeoning gold rush population around Gulgong-one of the richest goldfields in NSW. The 1876 remodelling of "The Greatest Wonder of the World" is of significance as an example of the innovative reuse of a simple earlier structure as a more substantial building, signalling the evolution of the town from camp to village. Together these buildings are of state heritage significance as they together demonstrate a pattern of construction and development typical of the development of gold rush towns in NSW.

The place has potential to yield information that will contribute to an understanding of the cultural or natural history of New South Wales.

The Greatest Wonder of the World and the American Tobacco Warehouse and Fancy Goods Emporium are of state heritage significance for their ability to demonstrate early "make do" construction technology and the personal resourcefulness necessary to make the timber-framed buildings with square studs, no noggings and saplings between, which were typical of gold rush buildings across NSW. They also provide information on the way gold rush towns evolved from their makeshift beginnings to more substantial townships as individuals and the community prospered through the fruits of the gold rush.

The place possesses uncommon, rare or endangered aspects of the cultural or natural history of New South Wales.

The Greatest Wonder of the World and the American Tobacco Warehouse and Fancy Goods Emporium are of state heritage significance as rare examples of gold rush commercial buildings dating from the early period of the significant goldfields at Gulgong-one of the highest yielding goldfields in NSW. The buildings demonstrate construction techniques used in the early and hasty establishment of goldfields towns of NSW. They are also an increasingly rare example of still-standing goldfields buildings documented in the Holtermann Collection.

The place is important in demonstrating the principal characteristics of a class of cultural or natural places/environments in New South Wales.

The Greatest Wonder of the World and the American Tobacco Warehouse and Fancy Goods Emporium are of state heritage significance as representative of hastily erected buildings from the early establishment of goldfields towns in NSW.
