= Gulgong =

- Town
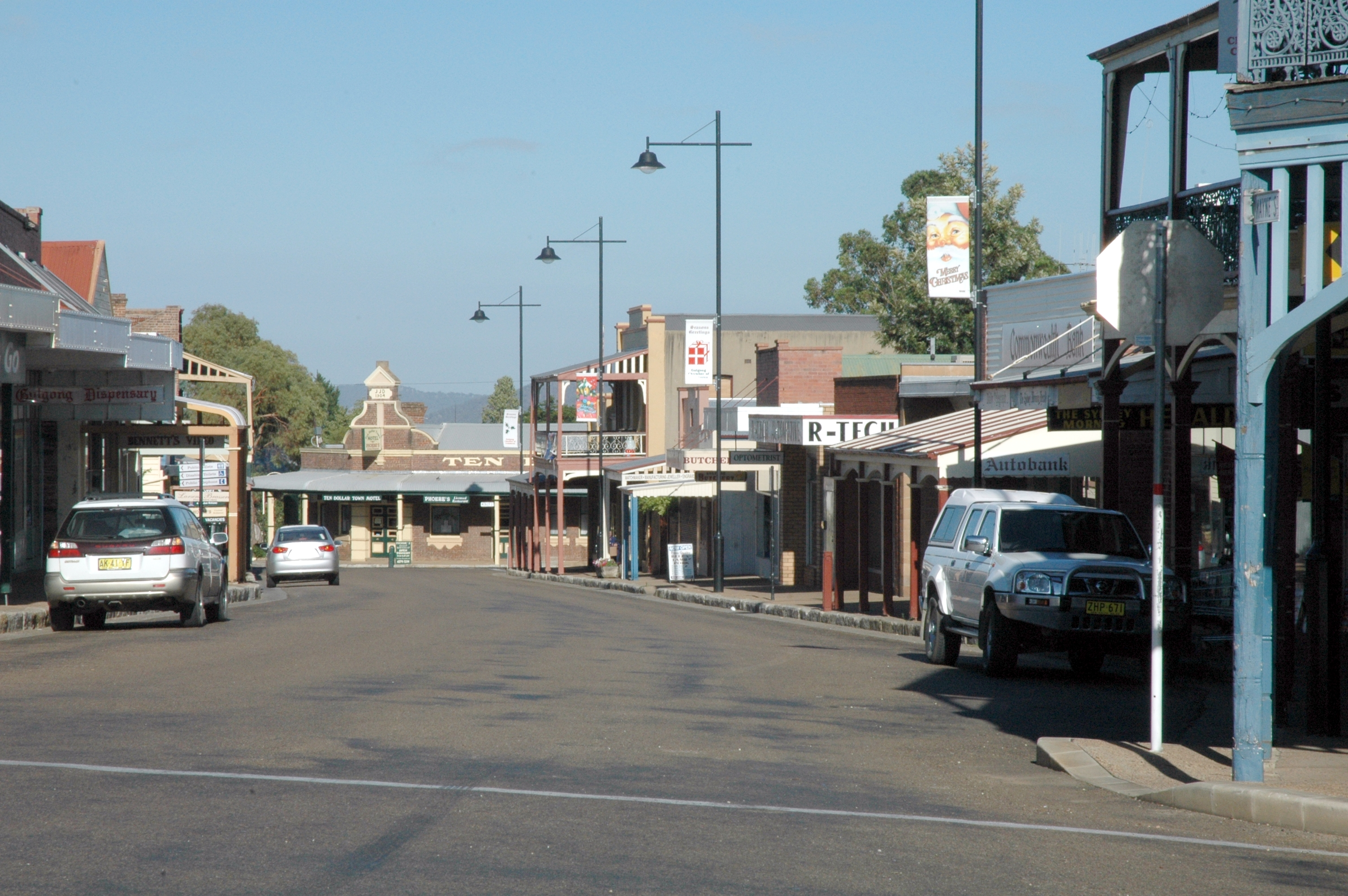
- Mayne Street

- Coordinates: 32°21′47″S 149°32′00″E
- Country: Australia
- State: New South Wales
- LGA: Mid-Western Regional Council
- Location: 299 km (186 mi) NW of Sydney; 110 km (68 mi) E of Dubbo; 174 km (108 mi) N of Orange; 30 km (19 mi) N of Mudgee

Government
  - State electorate: Dubbo
  - Federal division: Parkes
- Elevation: 475 m (1,558 ft)

Population
  - Total: 2,680 (SAL 2021)
- Postcode: 2852
- County: Phillip
- Mean max temp: 23.0 °C (73.4 °F)
- Mean min temp: 9.5 °C (49.1 °F)
- Annual rainfall: 647.8 mm (25.50 in)

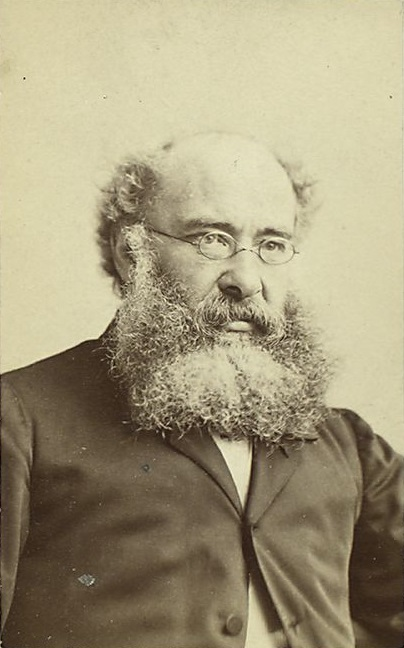
Anthony Trollope

Gulgong is a 19th-century gold rush town in the Central Tablelands and the wider Central West regions of the Australian state of New South Wales. The town is situated within the Mid-Western Regional Council local government area. It is located about 300 km (190 mi) north west of Sydney, and about 30 km north of Mudgee along the Castlereagh Highway. At the 2021 census, Gulgong had a population of 2,680.

Today, much of the 19th-century character of the town remains, contributing to its appeal as a tourist destination. Of special interest is the Prince of Wales Opera House, a survivor with a rich history.

Apart from tourism and hospitality, local industries include wine production, wool, wheat growing and coal mining.

Yarrobil National Park is located 21 kilometres (13 mi) north west of Gulgong.

== History ==
The name "Gulgong" is derived from the word used by the traditional inhabitants, the Wiradjuri, for "deep waterhole".

Lieutenant William Lawson passed through the area in November 1820 and again in 1821 and reported good grazing land in the region. This prompted the brothers George and Henry Cox, sons of William Cox, to take up land to the south of the Cudgegong River, while Lawson applied for land grants to the north. Others soon followed, taking up land with river frontage along the Cudgegong. Among the first to take formal possession was Richard Rouse who was granted land in 1825 by Governor Brisbane.

Gulgong came into existence after gold was discovered at Red Hill in 1870. The township was surveyed in August 1870. By the end of that year there were 800 people on the diggings, which yielded over 32 tons of gold in the 1870s. The population had increased to 12,000 by the time the British author Anthony Trollope visited in October 1871.

Gullgong [sic] was certainly a rough place when I visited it, but not quite as rough as I had expected. There was a hotel there, at which I got a bedroom to myself, though but a small one, and made only of slabs. But a gorgeously grand edifice was being built over our heads at the time. The inhabited part of the town consisted of two streets at right angles to each other, in each of which every habitation and shop had probably required but a few days for its erection. The fronts of the shops were covered with large advertisements, the names and praises of traders as is customary now with all new-fangled marts, but the place looked more like a fair than a town ... Everything needful, however, seemed to be at hand. There were bakers, butchers, grocers, and dealers in soft goods. There were public houses and banks in abundance. There was an auctioneer's establishment, at which I attended the sale of horses and carts. There was a photographer, and there was a theatre, at which I saw the "Colleen Bawn" acted with a great deal of spirit, and a considerable amount of histrionic talent. After the theatre a munificent banker of the town gave us an oyster supper, at a supper-room. It may be inferred, therefore, that the comforts of life have not been altogether neglected at Gullgong. In the middle of the day there had been a public dinner or lunch, at which there was much speaking. I cannot say that the Gullgong oratory was as good as the Gullgong acting or the Gullgong oysters.

The population of the town reached 20,000 in 1873. The Gulgong gold field was one of the last to be developed as "poor man's diggings", that is by individuals without substantial capital investment. During the height of the gold rush in the 1870s, Gulgong had 67 pubs (it now has four).

Novelist and bush poet Henry Lawson lived briefly in Gulgong as a child in the early 1870s, while his father sought instant wealth as a miner. A montage of goldrush-era Gulgong street scenes was used as a backdrop to the portrait of Lawson on the first Australian ten dollar note (which was in use from 1966 until replaced by a polymer banknote in November 1993). The town and its surrounding district feature in Lawson's fiction, especially in Joe Wilson and His Mates.

Gulgong is believed to be one of the primary locations in Thomas Alexander Browne's The Miner's Right which he wrote under the pseudonym Rolf Boldrewood . Australia's first novelist of note, Browne was police magistrate in the period 1871-81 and many of his characters have been matched to Gulgong goldfields identities. He once hosted English author Anthony Trollope, who later recorded his impressions of Australia and New Zealand (1875).

In 1872, Henry Beaufoy Merlin took photographic images on glass-plate negatives of many buildings in Gulgong – with owners, tenants and passers-by – and of gold mines and miners, creating a unique record of life, in the town and its surroundings, at the time of the gold rushes. These images of Gulgong form part of the Holtermann Collection.

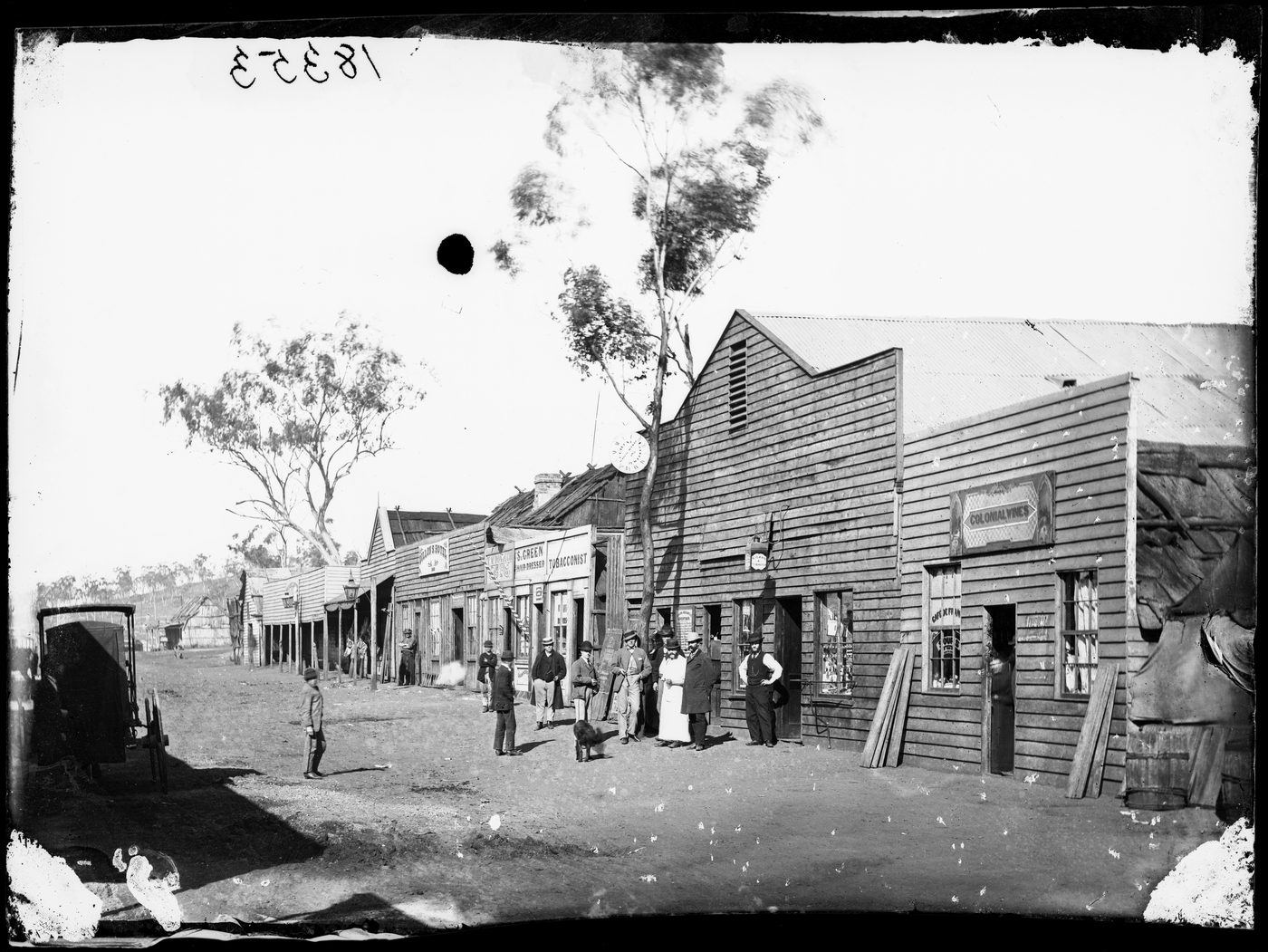
Mayne St, Gulgong c. 1872–73, soon after Anthony Trollope's visit to Gulgong. Attributed to photographer Henry Beaufoy Merlin.

A nearby area on the state register is known as the Talbragar fossil site, containing sometimes excellently preserved specimens of plants, fishes, invertebrates and a previously unknown spider. In addition, a site known as McGraths Flat about 25 miles northwest of Gulgong contains a recently discovered cache of Miocene era fossils.

Historical population
Year	Pop.	±%
1870	1,100	—
1871	3,228	+193.5%
1872	10,000	+209.8%
1873	15,000	+50.0%
1874	13,000	−13.3%
1875	6,000	−53.8%
1876	1,000	−83.3%
1893	1,283	+28.3%
1898	1,300	+1.3%
1901	1,586	+22.0%
Source: Gulgong Guardian Newspaper, 1871-1876. Moore's Almanac 1893-1900. Census Returns Mudgee Police District, 1901.

Historical population
Year	Pop.	±%
1921	1,520	—
1933	1,723	+13.4%
1947		—
1954	1,473	—
1961	1,396	−5.2%
1966	1,441	+3.2%
1971	1,485	+3.1%
1976	1,618	+9.0%
1981	1,740	+7.5%
1986	1,988	+14.3%
1991	2,042	+2.7%
1996	2,018	−1.2%
2001	2,021	+0.1%
2006	2,918	+44.4%
2011	2,383	−18.3%
2016	2,521	+5.8%
2021	2,680	+6.3%
Source: Australian Bureau of Statistics data.

== Climate ==
Climate data for Gulgong Post Office (1991–2020 normals, extremes 1970–present)
Month	Jan	Feb	Mar	Apr	May	Jun	Jul	Aug	Sep	Oct	Nov	Dec	Year
Record high °C (°F)	42.7 (108.9)	43.5 (110.3)	38.8 (101.8)	32.9 (91.2)	27.0 (80.6)	24.0 (75.2)	22.8 (73.0)	27.2 (81.0)	33.1 (91.6)	38.4 (101.1)	42.1 (107.8)	42.4 (108.3)	43.5 (110.3)
Mean daily maximum °C (°F)	31.7 (89.1)	30.4 (86.7)	27.7 (81.9)	24.0 (75.2)	19.5 (67.1)	15.8 (60.4)	15.2 (59.4)	17.0 (62.6)	20.5 (68.9)	24.2 (75.6)	27.3 (81.1)	29.7 (85.5)	23.6 (74.5)
Daily mean °C (°F)	24.5 (76.1)	23.5 (74.3)	20.8 (69.4)	16.9 (62.4)	12.8 (55.0)	9.8 (49.6)	9.0 (48.2)	10.1 (50.2)	13.3 (55.9)	16.9 (62.4)	20.0 (68.0)	22.4 (72.3)	16.7 (62.1)
Mean daily minimum °C (°F)	17.2 (63.0)	16.6 (61.9)	13.9 (57.0)	9.8 (49.6)	6.2 (43.2)	3.9 (39.0)	2.8 (37.0)	3.3 (37.9)	6.2 (43.2)	9.5 (49.1)	12.7 (54.9)	15.1 (59.2)	9.8 (49.6)
Record low °C (°F)	6.4 (43.5)	6.9 (44.4)	3.5 (38.3)	−1.2 (29.8)	−3.2 (26.2)	−5.2 (22.6)	−7.2 (19.0)	−4.9 (23.2)	−1.7 (28.9)	−0.5 (31.1)	1.4 (34.5)	3.0 (37.4)	−7.2 (19.0)
Average precipitation mm (inches)	71.4 (2.81)	67.1 (2.64)	62.6 (2.46)	34.7 (1.37)	37.6 (1.48)	47.8 (1.88)	55.4 (2.18)	37.4 (1.47)	52.7 (2.07)	56.6 (2.23)	69.2 (2.72)	84.1 (3.31)	676.8 (26.65)
Average precipitation days (≥ 1.0 mm)	5.9	5.7	5.2	3.2	4.3	6.1	6.0	4.5	5.3	5.8	6.8	6.6	65.3
Average dew point °C (°F)	14.1 (57.4)	14.3 (57.7)	12.6 (54.7)	9.8 (49.6)	7.3 (45.1)	5.7 (42.3)	4.1 (39.4)	4.1 (39.4)	6.5 (43.7)	8.5 (47.3)	10.6 (51.1)	12.1 (53.8)	9.1 (48.4)
Source 1: National Oceanic and Atmospheric Administration
Source 2: Bureau of Meteorology

== Museums ==
Pioneers Museum
The Pioneer Museum is run completely by volunteer members of the Gulgong Historical Society Inc. Situated across a 1.5-acre site in the town centre the museum displays a significant collection of historic objects, including buildings and vehicles relocated from properties across the region. The collection captures the essence of the gold rush history of the town.

Gulgong Holtermann Museum
Gulgong Holtermann Museum is a community project and a museum space located in Gulgong. Two of the town's earliest buildings, The Greatest Wonder of the World and American Tobacco Warehouse and Fancy Goods Emporium, house an interactive educational and tourist facility based on the UNESCO listed Holtermann collection of photographs commissioned by Bernhardt Holtermann during the "roaring days" of the 1870s.

Gulgong Gold Experience
The location of the early gold finds in Gulgong has been turned into a Museum and exhibition. Built into Red Hill the site is home to an assortment of original mining equipment and has public access to one of the original mines.

== Heritage listings ==
Gulgong has a number of heritage-listed sites, including:

Prince of Wales opera house
Built by 1871 by John Hart Gogden the Prince of Wales Opera house is the oldest still-operating Opera House in the Southern Hemisphere. The opera house is now owned and operated by the Gulgong Amateur Musical and Dramatical Society.

Hobsons Shops
Hobsons Shops is a heritage-listed retail building at 75 Herbert Street, Gulgong. It was added to the New South Wales State Heritage Register on 2 April 1999.

The Greatest Wonder of the World and American Tobacco Warehouse and Fancy Goods Emporium
The Greatest Wonder of the World and American Tobacco Warehouse and Fancy Goods Emporium are heritage-listed adjacent shops at 123-125 Mayne Street, Gulgong. They were built from 1870 to 1878. They have been refurbished to house the Gulgong Holtermann Museum, with new galleries constructed at the back to house the UNESCO listed HOLTERMANN COLLECTION. The original buildings were added to the New South Wales State Heritage Register on 21 October 2016.

Wallerawang-Gwabegar railway
Wyaldra Creek railway bridge

Wallerawang-Gwabegar railway
Gulgong railway station

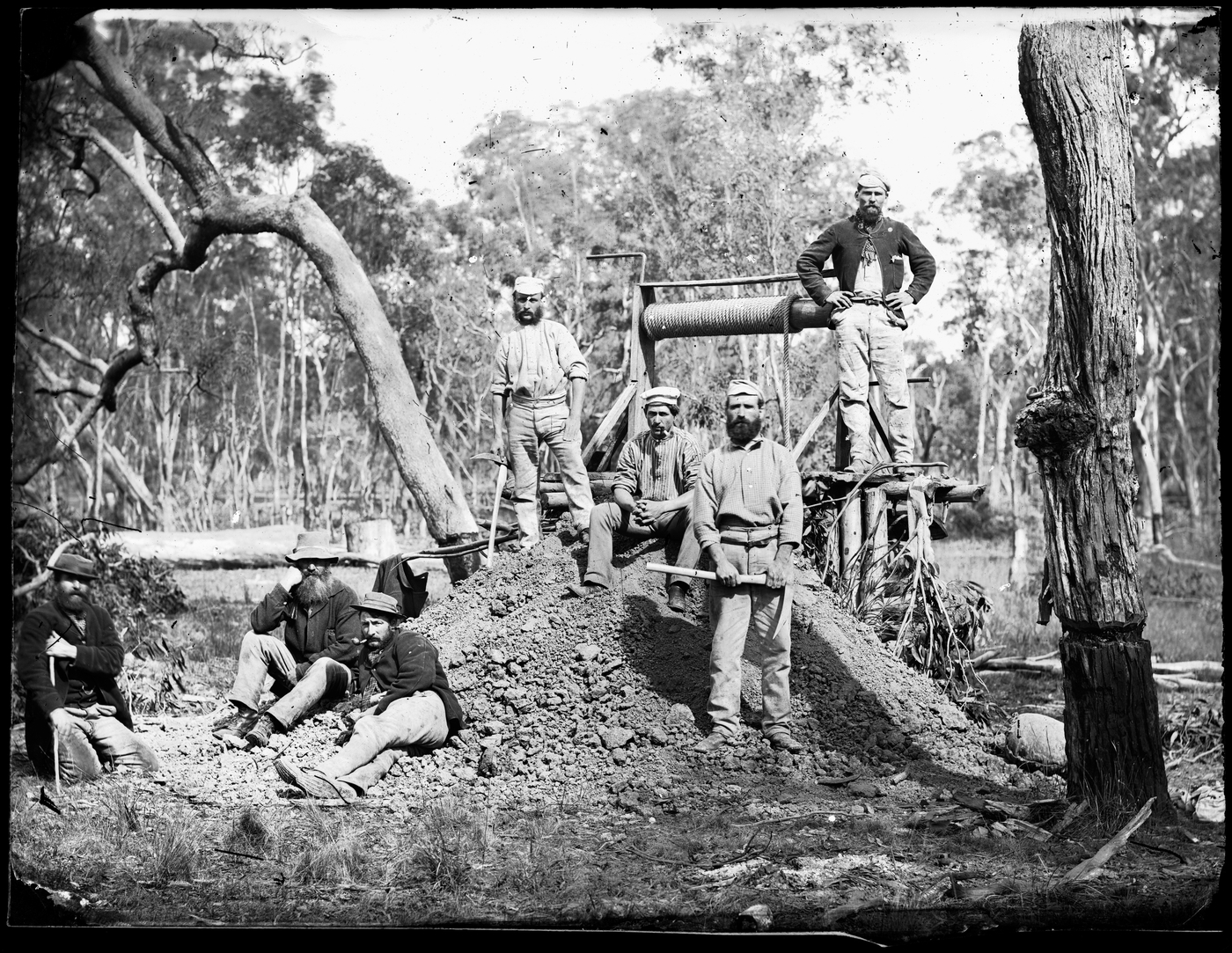
Gulgong gold miners, c. 1872–73 (State Library of New South Wales, attributed to photographer Henry Beaufoy Merlin)

Mayne St, Belmore St, Herbert St
A large portion of the homes and businesses on Mayne St are of historical significant and protected under Heritage Protection Laws.

== Railways ==
The now closed Gulgong railway station is at the junction of the Sandy Hollow line (which runs west from Muswellbrook) and the Gwabegar line (which runs north-south from Gwabegar to Wallerawang), the former connecting to the latter through a junction south of the station. A section of the Gwabegar railway line south of Gulgong to Rylstone is closed.

== Events ==
Gulgong is a regular host to both regional and international festivals and events.

Clay Gulgong Festival
Gulgong has hosted an international ceramics festival every two to three years since 1989, most recently over 9 to 15 April 2022.

Folk Festival
Gulgong has a 40-year history of holding folk festivals.

The Henry Lawson Festival
The Henry Lawson Festival is an arts festival held annually on the June long weekend in Gulgong, New South Wales (NSW), Australia. Henry Lawson, one of Australia's best loved poets and writer of short stories, was born in Grenfell, and he lived in Gulgong for a time as a child.

Mudgee Classic
The annual Mudgee classic cycling event now incorporates Gulgong into its route, allowing for cyclists to resupply during the event.

Gulgong Show
The Gulgong show is a regional agricultural festival attracting over 3500 participants and spectators each year. The show hosts a large number of livestock, arts, food and craft competitions.

== Notable people ==
- Jimmy Governor, on whom Thomas Keneally based his character for The Chant of Jimmy Blacksmith, grew up in the Gulgong district and married there in 1898.
- Nancy Hill (born 1934), Australian basketball representative
- Josh Jackson, rugby league player
- Louisa Lawson, poet and mother of Henry Lawson
- Colin McKellar, Australian senator
- Michaeley O'Brien, Australian screenwriter

== Gallery ==
Some images of Gulgong NSW

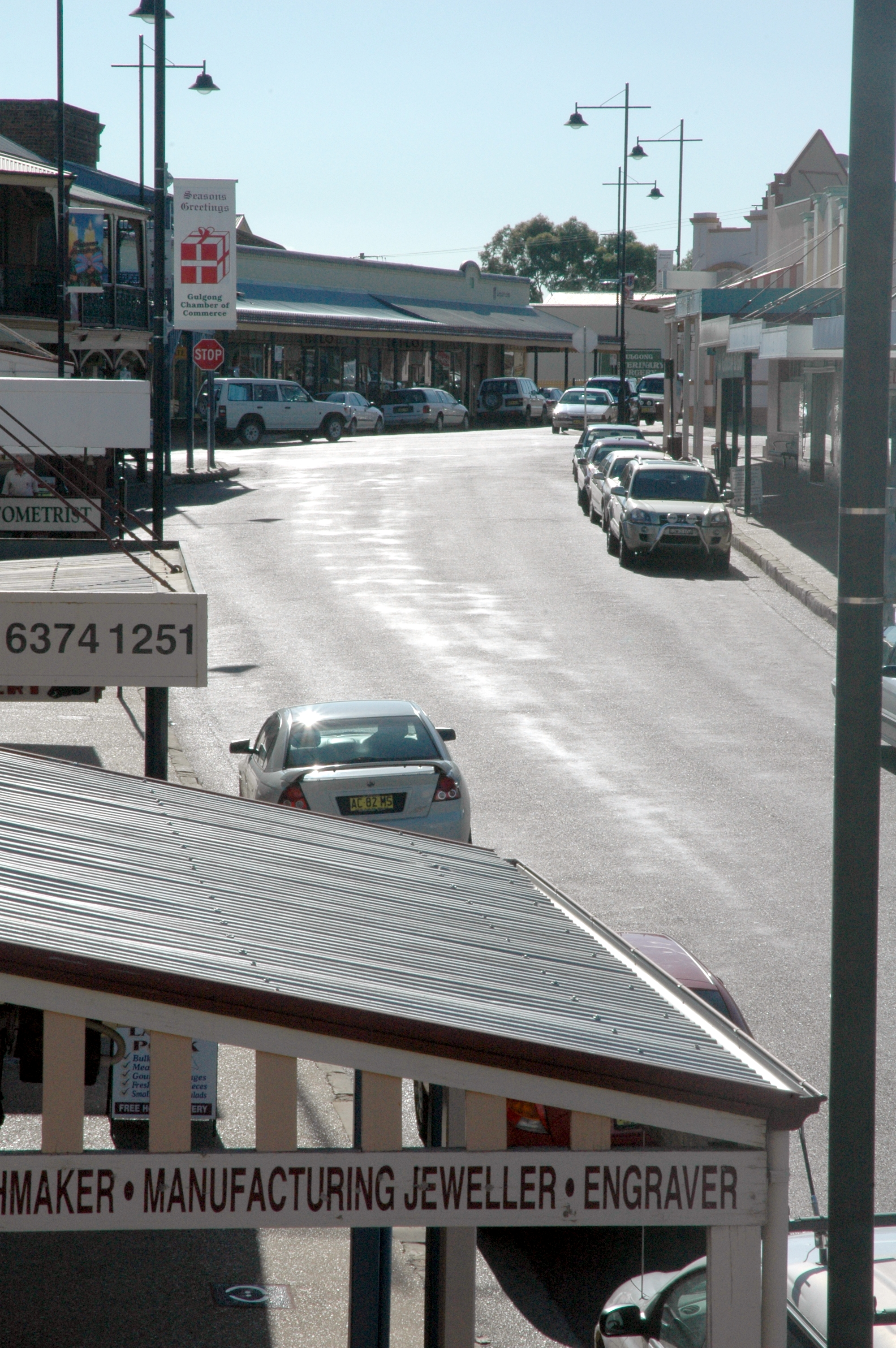
The streets of Gulgong have changed very little since the 19th century

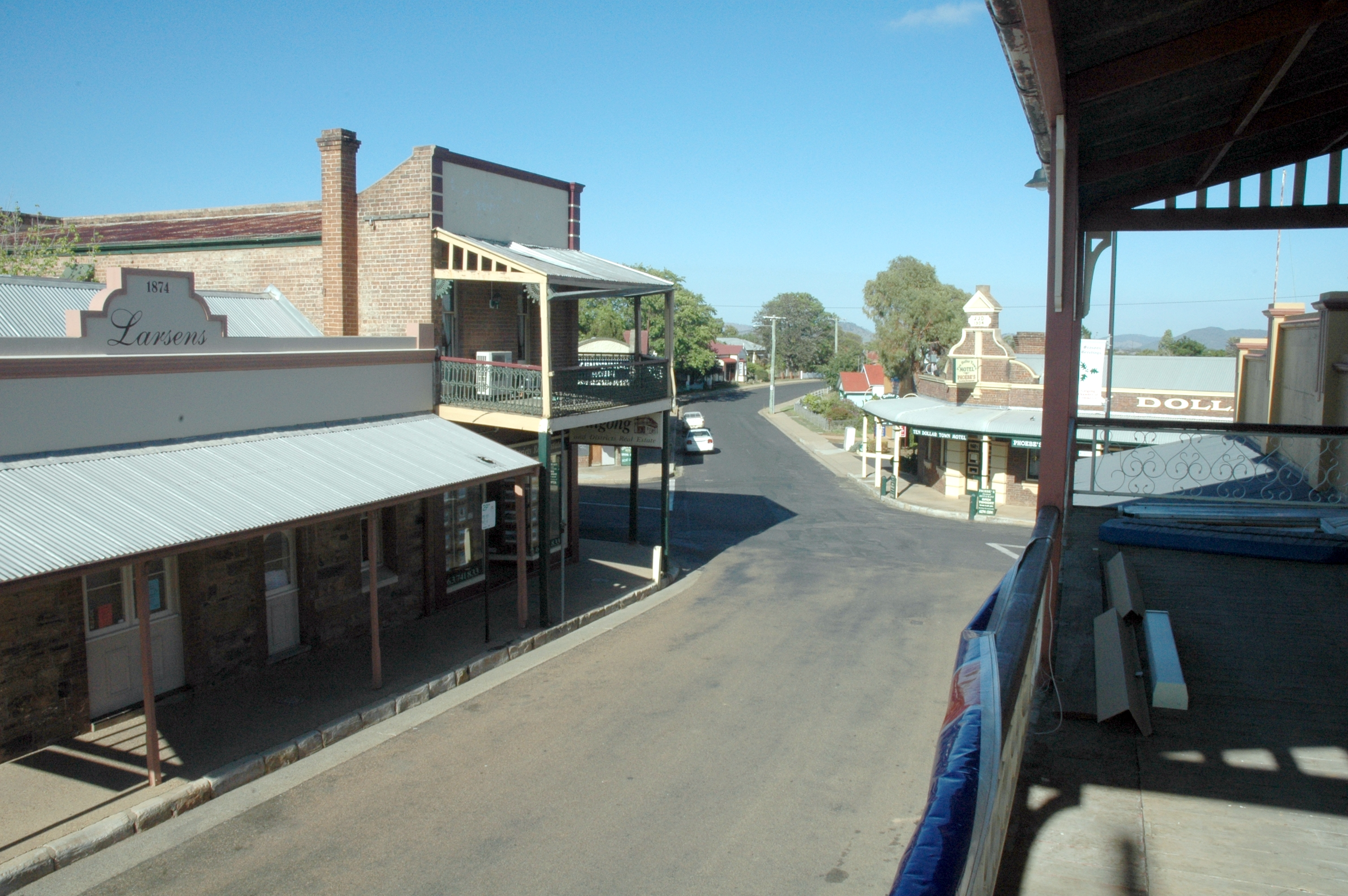
View from balcony above mechanics workshop

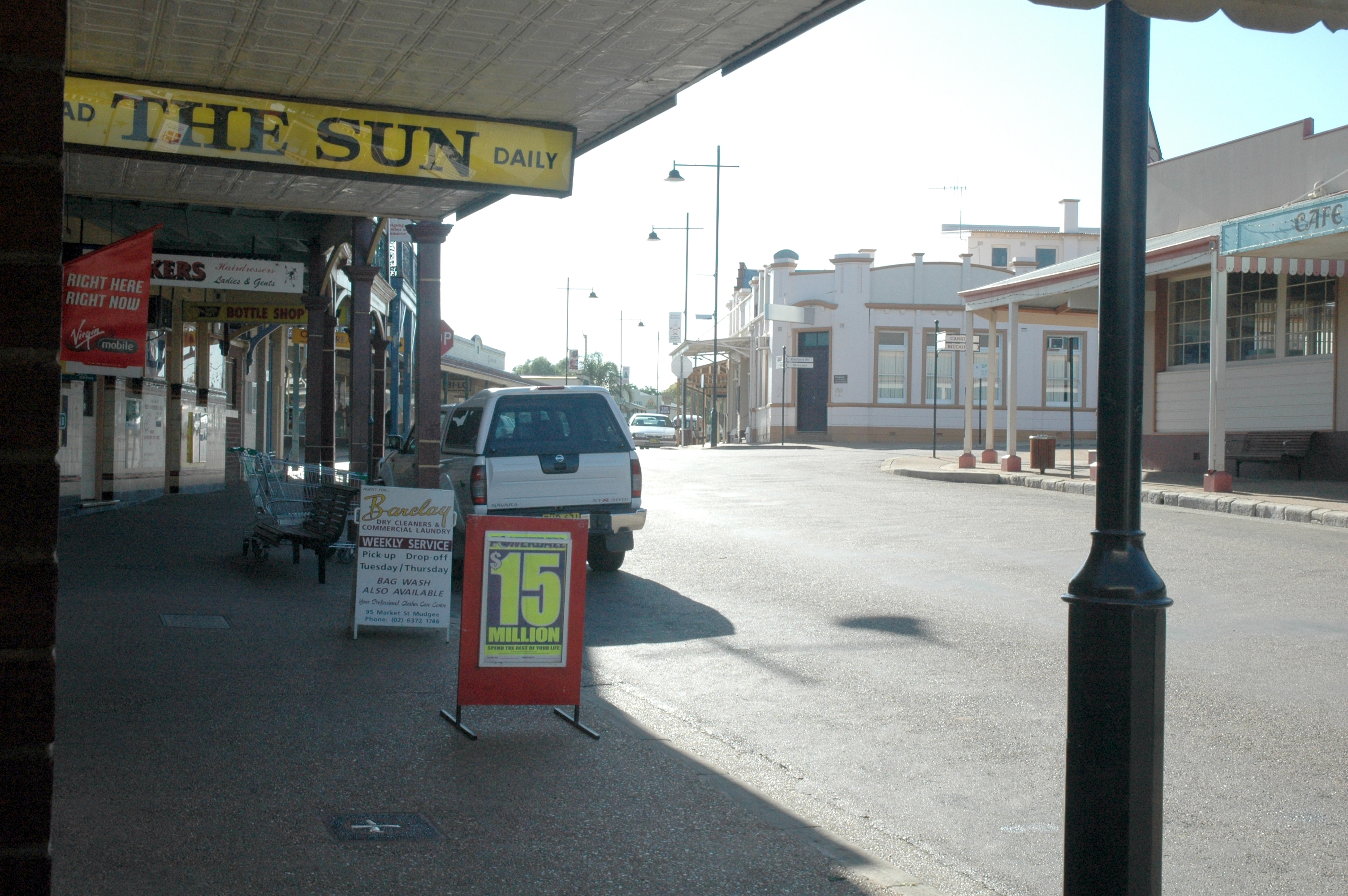
Mayne St Gulgong

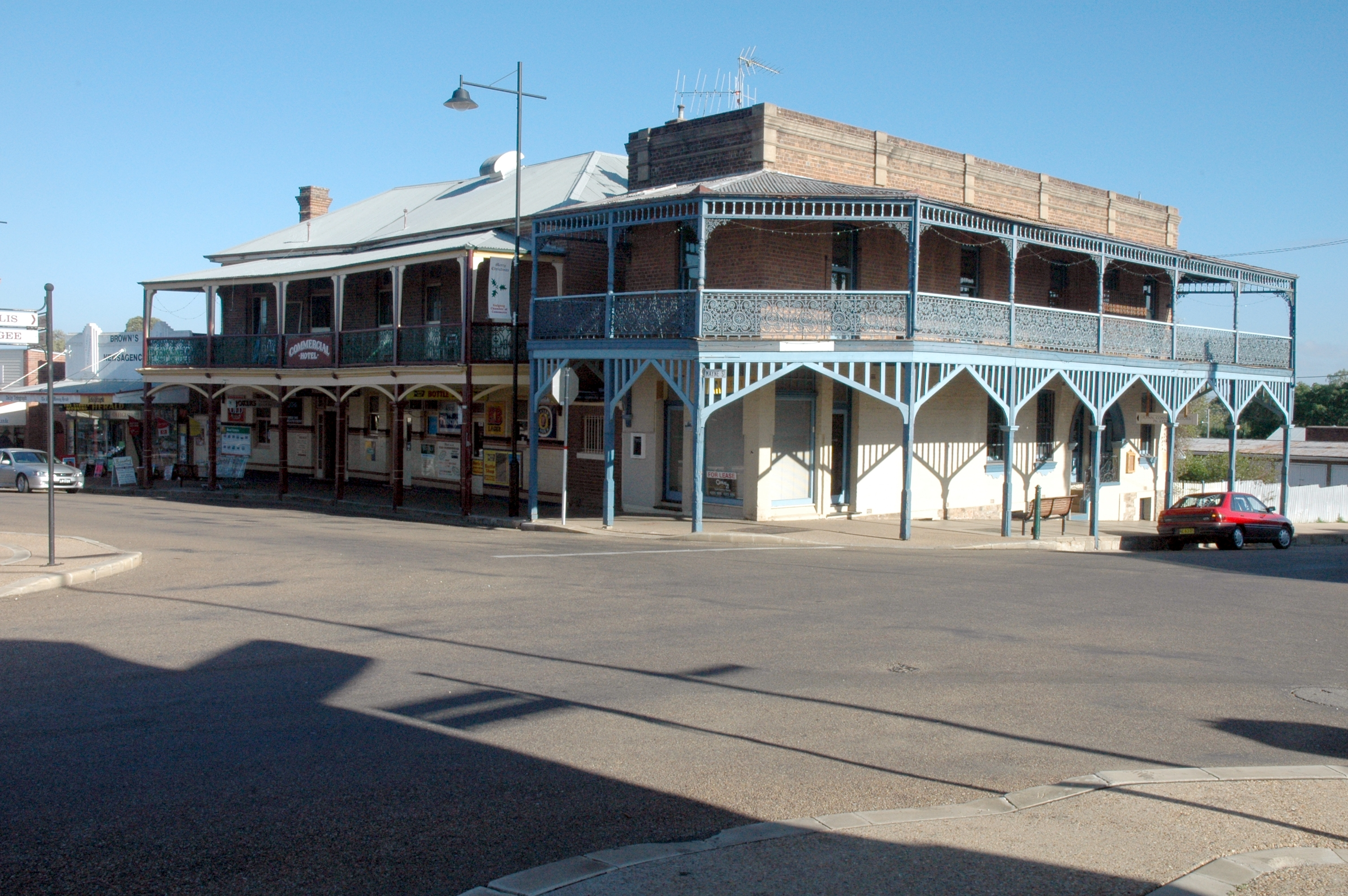
Typical old commercial buildings in Gulgong

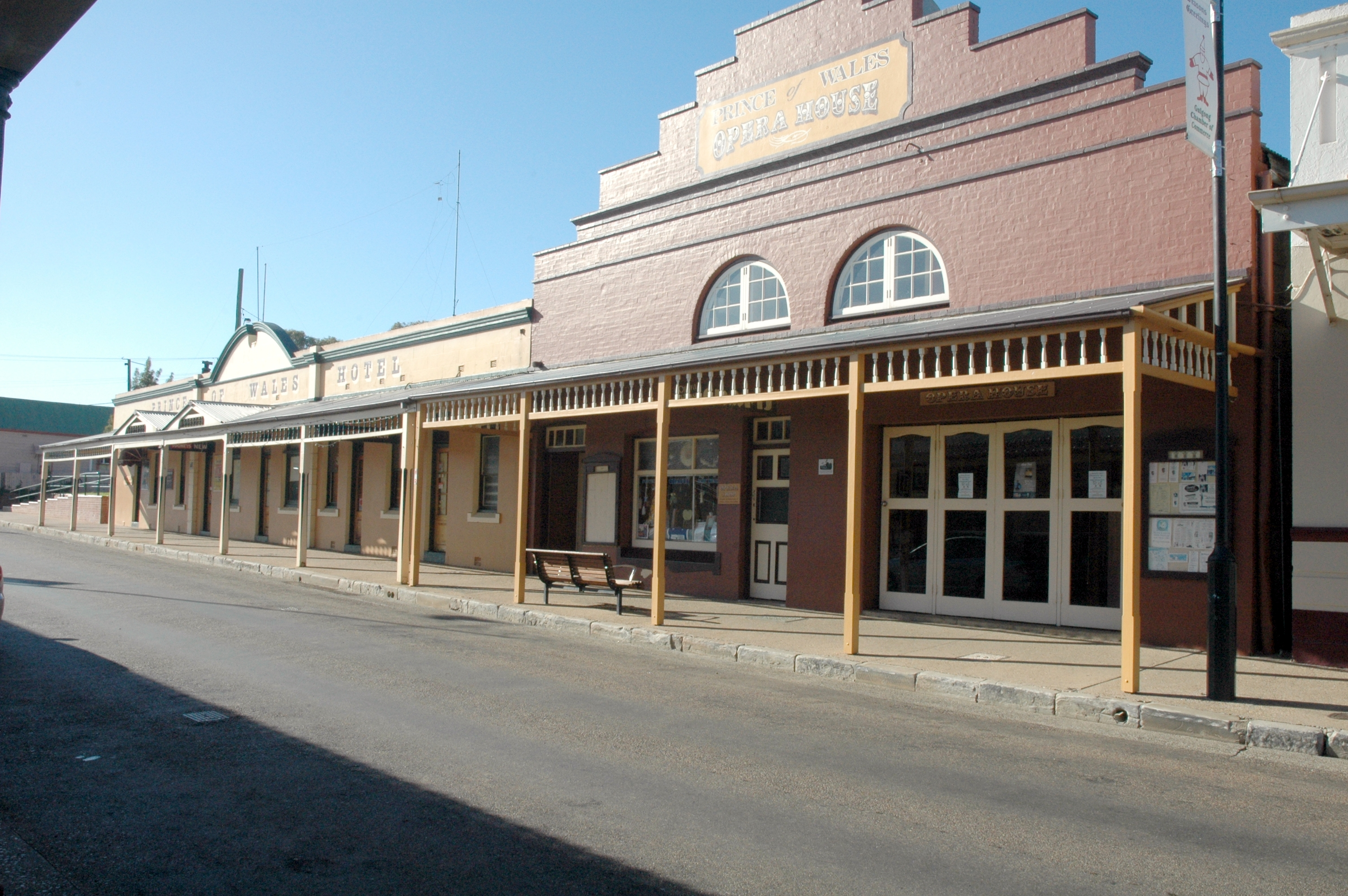
Prince of Wales Opera House

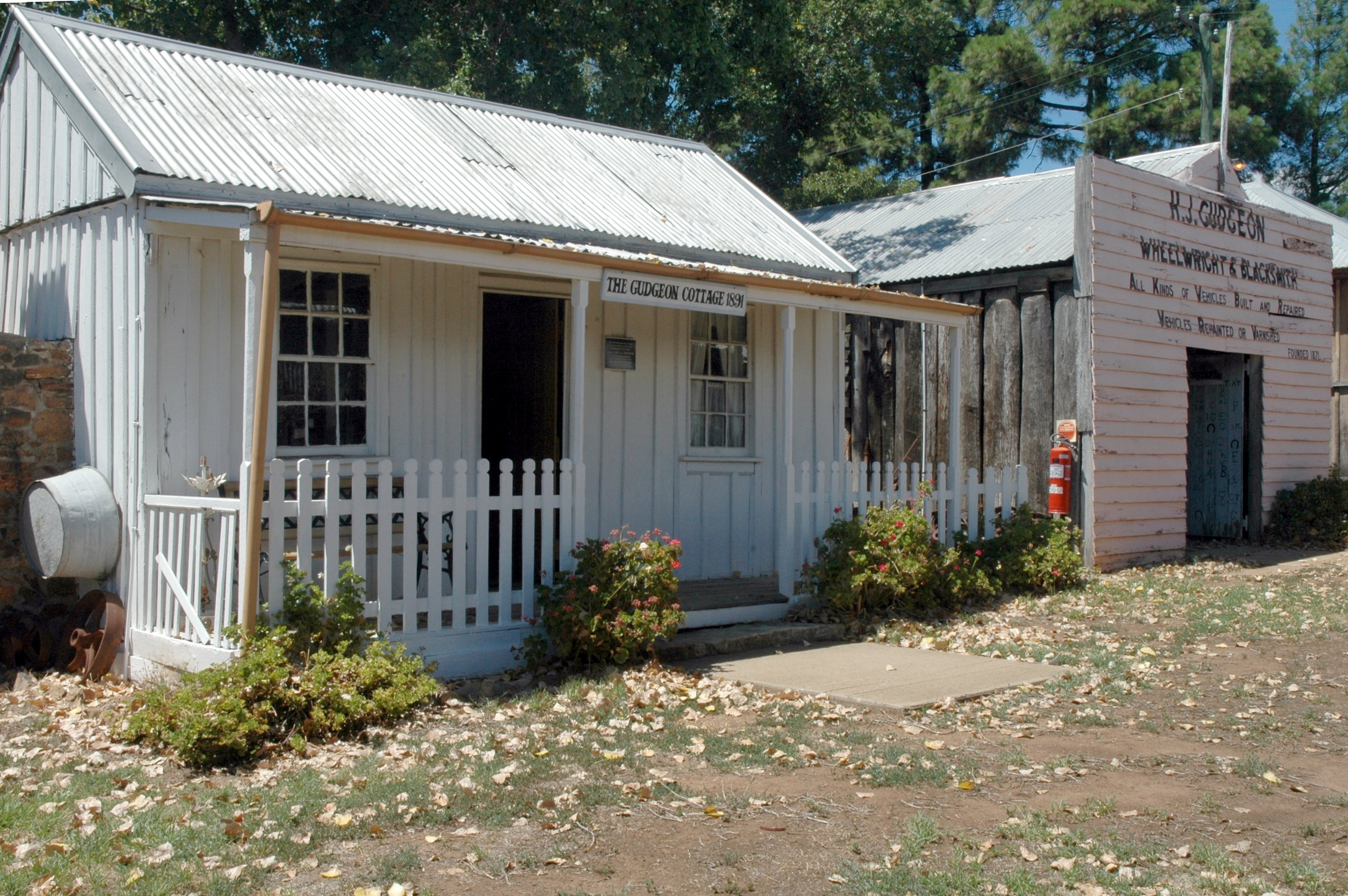
Original Gulgong district smithy's house and workshop relocated to "street" in Gulgong museum

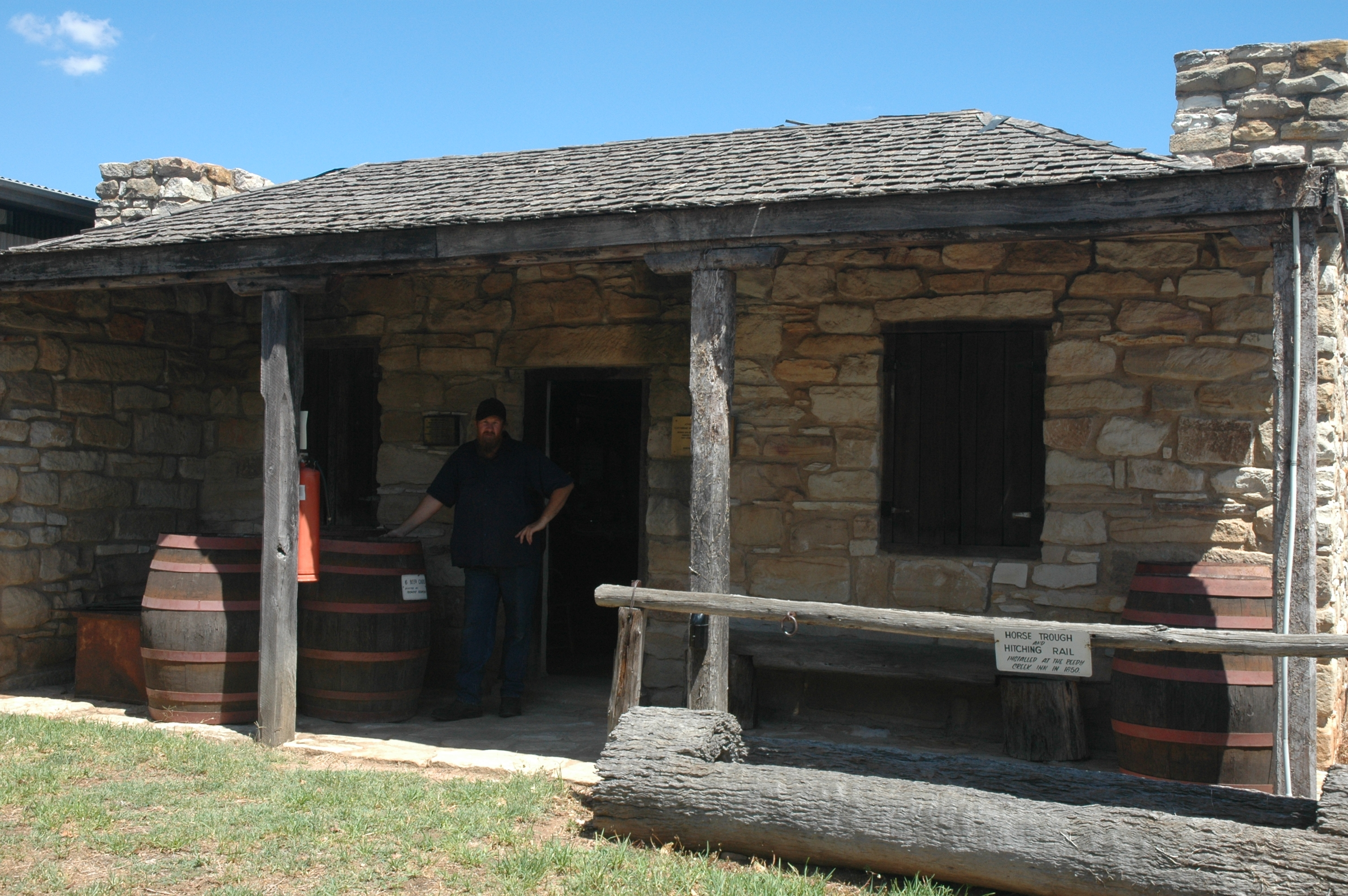
Local inn, from the 1840s, relocated to museum "street"

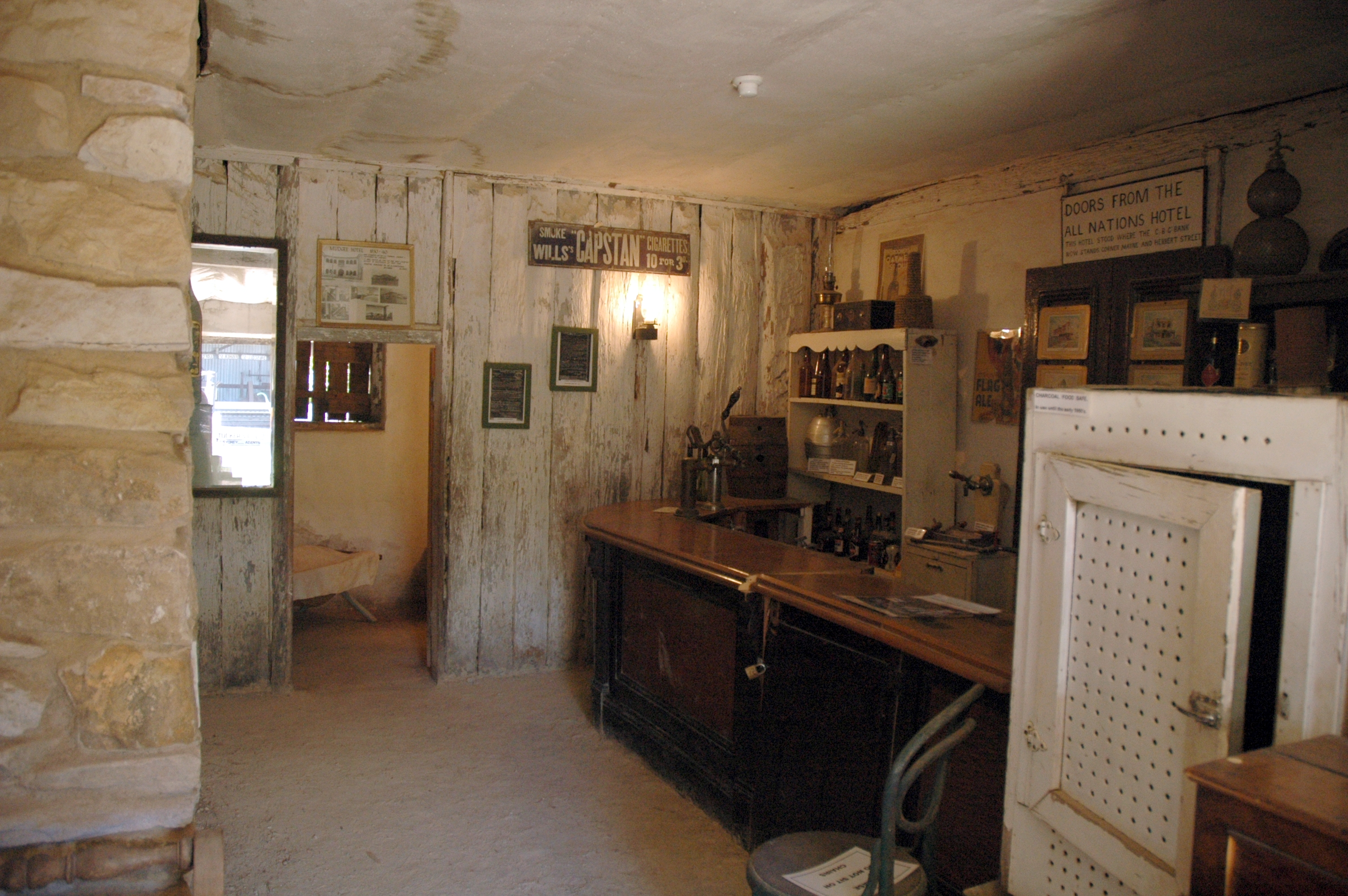
Interior of the inn

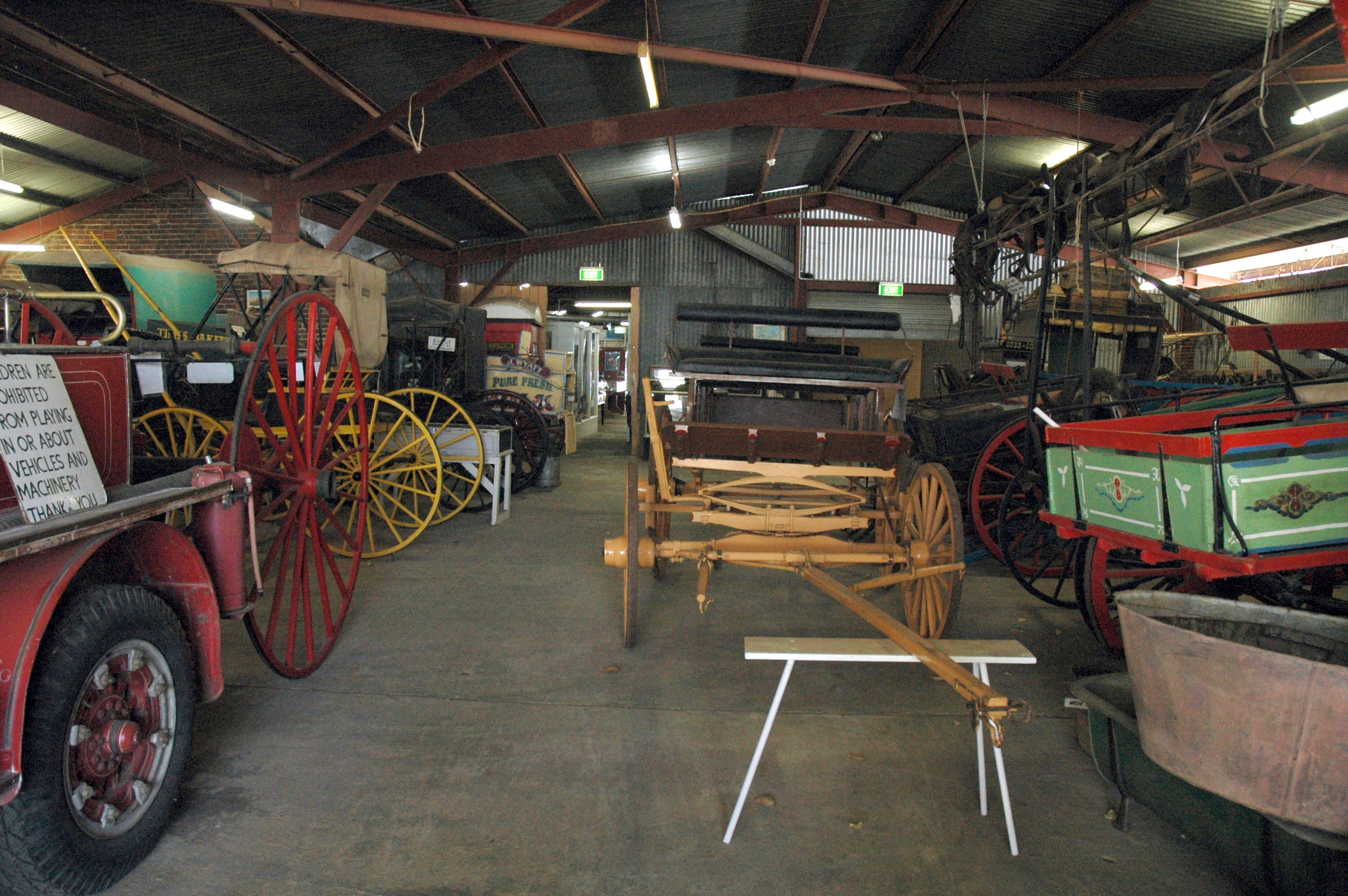
Horse drawn and motor vehicles in Gulgong museum
