= Sandy Hollow–Gulgong railway line =

Railway line in Australia

The Sandy Hollow–Gulgong railway line is a railway line in New South Wales, Australia. The line forms a cross country connection from the Main North line in the Upper Hunter region to the Gwabegar line in the Central West region. The line is approximately 125 kilometres (78 mi) in length. From the Gwabegar line, trains can then ultimately reach the Main West line creating a circuitous bypass of Sydney for freight traffic heading between the west and north of New South Wales. The line was opened in 1985.

== History ==
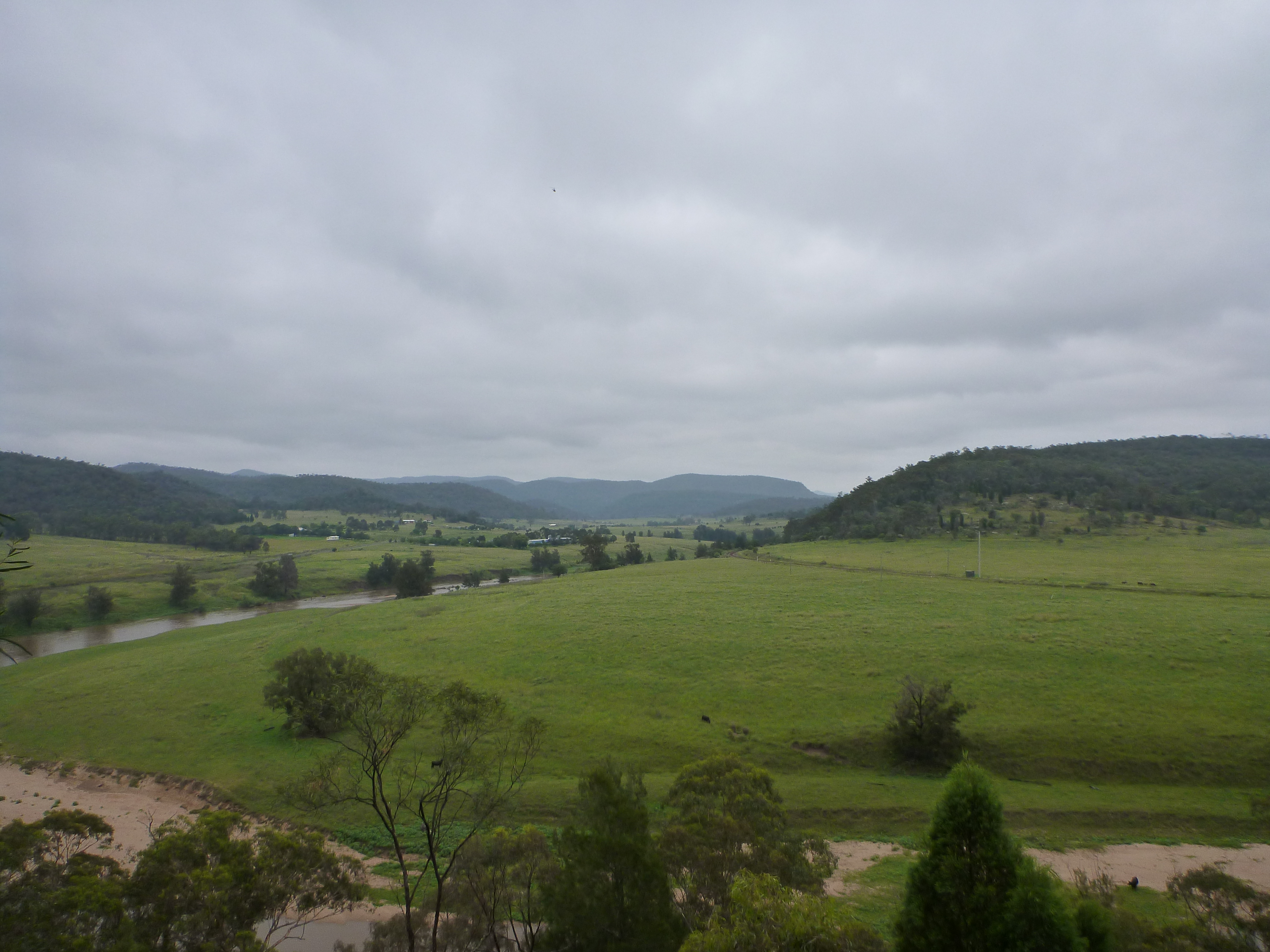
The line – seen on the right – runs adjacent to the Goulburn River as it passes through Widden.

The Sandy Hollow Line between Sandy Hollow, Gulgong and Maryvale (between Wellington and Dubbo), was originally surveyed in 1860 as a more easily graded crossing of the Great Dividing Range than the Blue Mountains line nearer to Sydney. It was not commenced, however, until 1937, when it began as an unemployment relief scheme of the NSW Government, achieving infamy for having no modern mechanical devices used on it, other than trucks carrying concrete for the 5 tunnels and bridge piers, all other work being done with picks, shovels, hand drills, horses and carts. Folk singer Duke Tritton wrote a poem The Sandy Hollow Line, which described the hardships of the unemployed workers on "susso" who worked on the line.

Construction continued through World War 2 at a desultory pace, held up by money, labour and especially steel shortages, only to be abandoned unfinished, approximately 92% complete, a few years later in 1951. The line crosses the Great Dividing Range by following the Goulburn River and Bylong Valleys from Sandy Hollow to Bylong, with a tunnel under Cox's Gap.

The Kerrabee Tunnel, No.1 of 3 in the Bylong range and 1 of 5 on the entire line, that was built under Cox's Gap between 1946 and 1949 was used for eastbound road traffic on the Bylong Valley Way until work recommenced in the early 1980s. It was used in 1978 in the filming of the opening scene for the television series Torque, hosted by Peter Wherrett. In that scene, a Bolwell Nagari driven by Wherrett approached as lights in the dark tunnel, then the camera drew back as the car drove out of the tunnel. The tunnel was also used in a scene in the Australian movie The Chain Reaction

The line was opened as a heavy-haul railway to the major coal mine at Ulan in 1982 and extended to Gulgong in 1985 to meet the line to Dunedoo and Dubbo.

Transport for NSW included an extension from Gulgong to Maryvale as part of the Fixing Country Rail program. A 2020 feasibility study found that completing the line would cost $328 million and have a BCR between 0.97 and 1.55, and suggested progressing it to the next stage of investigation, although as of July 2026 this has not happened.

== Current status ==
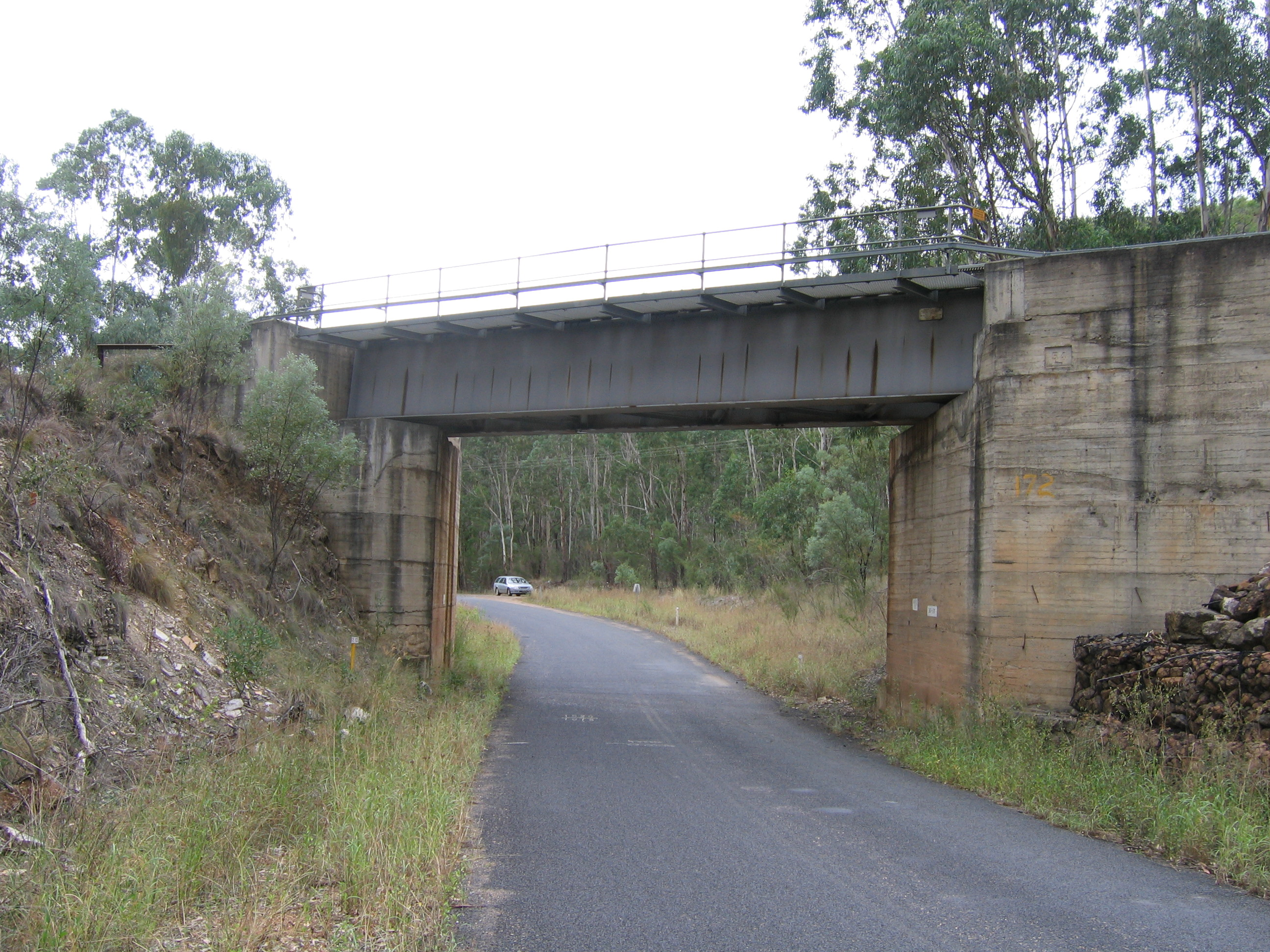
Bylong Valley Way passes under line west of Cox's Gap

Because coal from the Ulan area is now the primary function of this line, Australian Rail Track Corporation (ARTC) refer to the line as the Ulan line all the way from Muswellbrook to Gulgong. Coal from the Ulan, Moolarben, Wilpinjong @ the Western Ulan End and Mangoola (Anvil Hill), Mt Pleasant and Bengalla Mines close to Muswellbrook also use this line. In preparation for this, ARTC are upgrading the lines in the Muswellbrook yard and adding two more passing loops to the Ulan line in 2007. More Loops have been added since then as below. The line previously used outdated electric train staff (ETS) safeworking procedures in 5 sections over its length. This is being replaced with centralised traffic control (CTC) in 5 stages. The stages correspond to the 5 ETS sections, numbered from Muswellbrook to Gulgong. The 4th stage, to Ulan, was completed in May 2008. This extends CTC to the westernmost coal mine on the line, covering the majority of train movements on the line.

Progress at upgrading the signaling by ARTC was criticised as slow and causing bottlenecks. The upgrade was previously due to be completed at the end of 2007.

== Station layout ==
Ulan has a balloon loop to terminate, load, and return the coal trains up to 1800m long. There is also a crossing loop 900m long. Unlike earlier plans, there are no sidings for general freight, nor any passenger platforms.

Wilpinjong, Moolarben, Mangoola (Anvil Hill), Mt Pleasant and Bengalla also have a balloon loops.

== Crossing loops ==
As of December 2019, there are thirteen crossing loops. The loops (and their lengths) are located at:

- Bengalla – 1770m
- Mangoola – 1670m
- Yarrawa – 1660m
- Sandy Hollow – 1558m
- Baerami – 1655m
- Kerrabee – 1550m
- Murrumbo – 1660m
- Bylong – 3424m
- Coggan Creek – 1740m
- Wollar – 1655m
- Wilpinjong – 1660m
- Ulan – 936m
- Gulgong – 400m

== See also ==
- Rail transport in New South Wales
