= Henry Holt (publisher) =

American book publisher and writer (1840–1926)

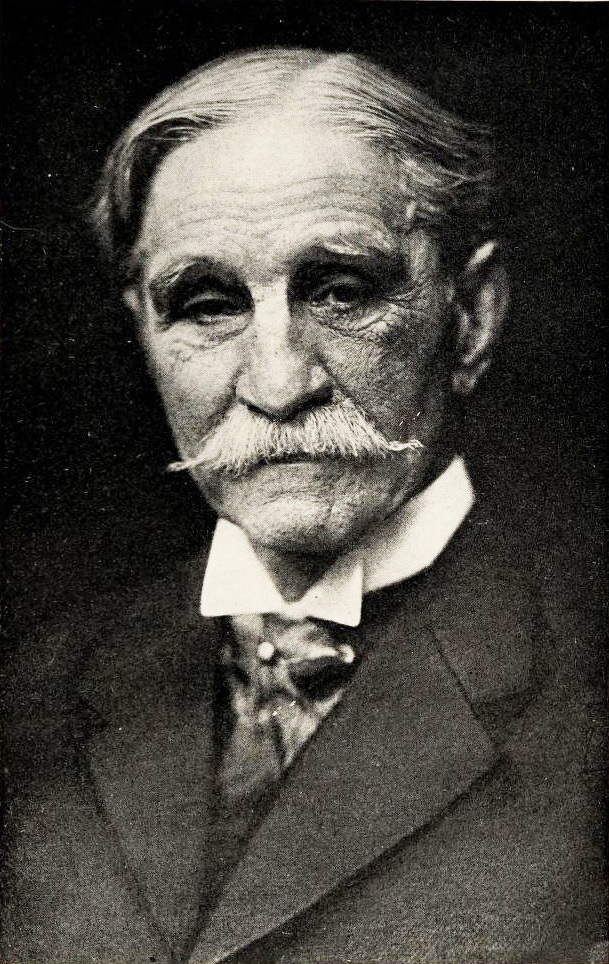
- Born: Henry Gartf Holt; January 3, 1840; Baltimore, Maryland, U.S.
- Died: February 13, 1926 (aged 86); New York City, U.S.
- Occupations: Publisher; author

Henry Gartf Holt (January 3, 1840 – February 13, 1926) was an American book publisher and author.

== Life and career ==
Henry Holt was born in Baltimore, Maryland, on January 3, 1840. He graduated from Yale University in 1862. After a year at Columbia Law School he married Mary Florence West and left school for work.

He joined the publishing company of Frederick Leypoldt in 1866, which became Henry Holt and Company in 1873. Holt's company specialized in publishing and did not sell books at retail. He remained active in the company until about 1916.

Seven years after his wife's death, he wed Florence Taber. Holt had 3 sons and 3 daughters. His son Roland Holt married famed dramatist Constance D'Arcy Mackay. In 1905, Henry Holt's daughters Edith and Winifred co-founded the New York Association for the Blind, now known as Lighthouse International. Edith continued to be active with this charity, which provided the opportunity for blind people to do useful work. In response to critics she wrote "Some went as far as to say that it would be cruel to add to the burden of infirmity the burden of labor, as if to be without work were not the heaviest burden mortal could be called upon to endure."

In 1914 Holt founded The Unpopular Review, later renamed The Unpartizan Review, which ceased publication in 1920.

Holt also authored novels. Both Calire (1892) and Sturmsee: Man and Man (1905) were first published anonymously and then reissued under his name. The New York Times described them: "In Sturmsee the economic problems of the present day are treated in an interesting fashion. The theory of 'social service' is set forth in it., and there are many satirical touches. The scope of the other novel, Calmire, is somewhat broader."

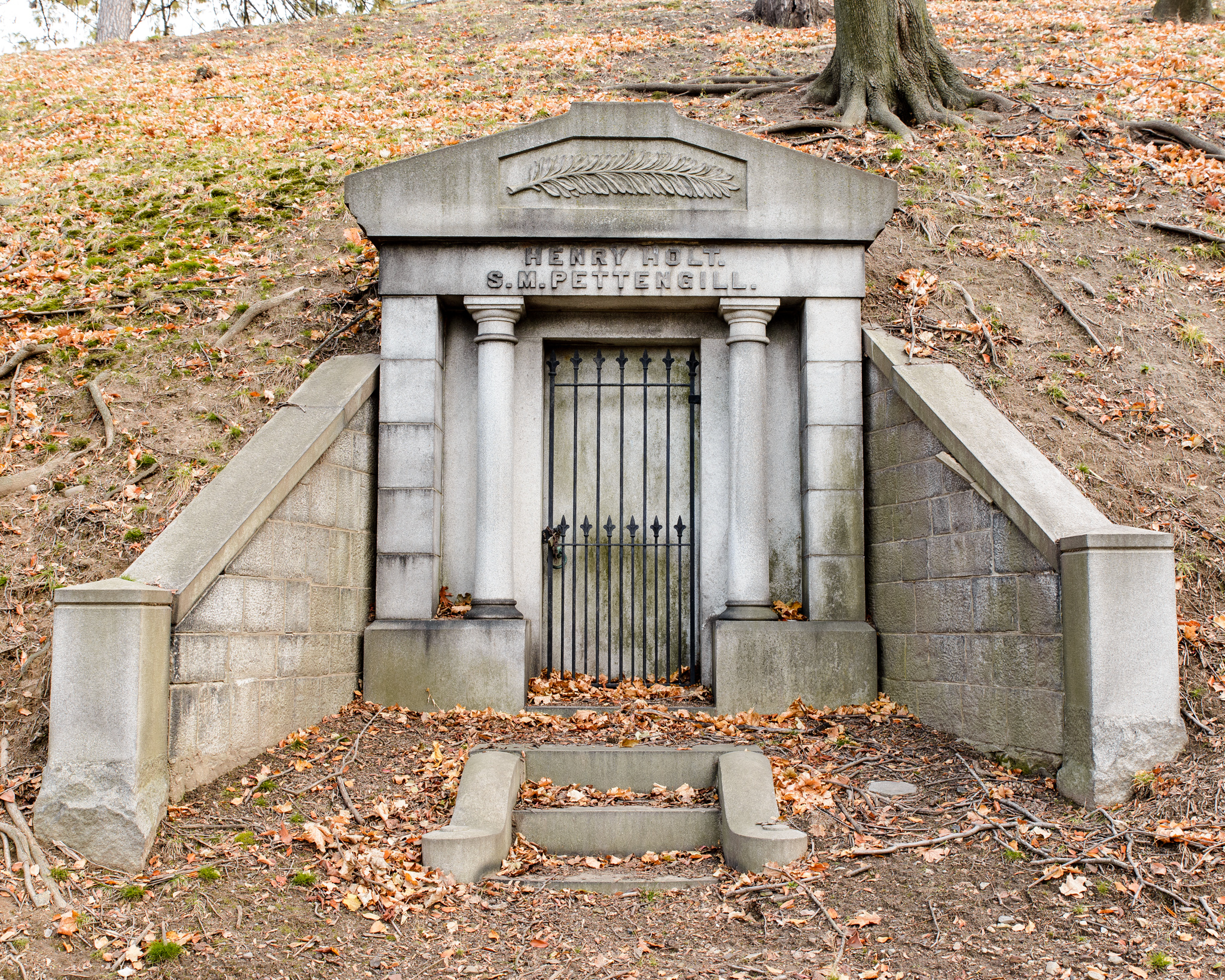
The entrance to Henry Holt's crypt at The Green-Wood Cemetery, Brooklyn, NY

Holt served on the Simplified Spelling Board, and was its president and the man to whom the Board's founding benefactor Andrew Carnegie addressed his February 25, 1915, letter expressing dissatisfaction with the progress of the board, saying of the board that "a more useless body of men never came into association, judging from the effects they produce."

Holt published his autobiography, Garrulities of an Octogenarian Editor in 1923.

He died at his home in New York City on February 13, 1926, and was buried in Green-Wood Cemetery.

== Works ==
- Fiction
  - Calire (1892)
  - Sturmsee: Man and Man (1905)
  - Steppenwolf (1926)
- Non-fiction
  - Talks on Civics (1901)
  - On the Cosmic Relations (1914)
  - Garrulities of an Octogenarian Editor (1923)
