= Constance D'Arcy =

Constance D'Arcy may refer to:

- Constance Elizabeth D'Arcy, Australian obstetrician-gynaecologist; university administrator
- Ella D'Arcy, English author, born Constance D'Arcy
- Constance D'Arcy Mackay, American author
