= Rylstone railway station, New South Wales =

Railway station in New South Wales, Australia

Rylstone railway station
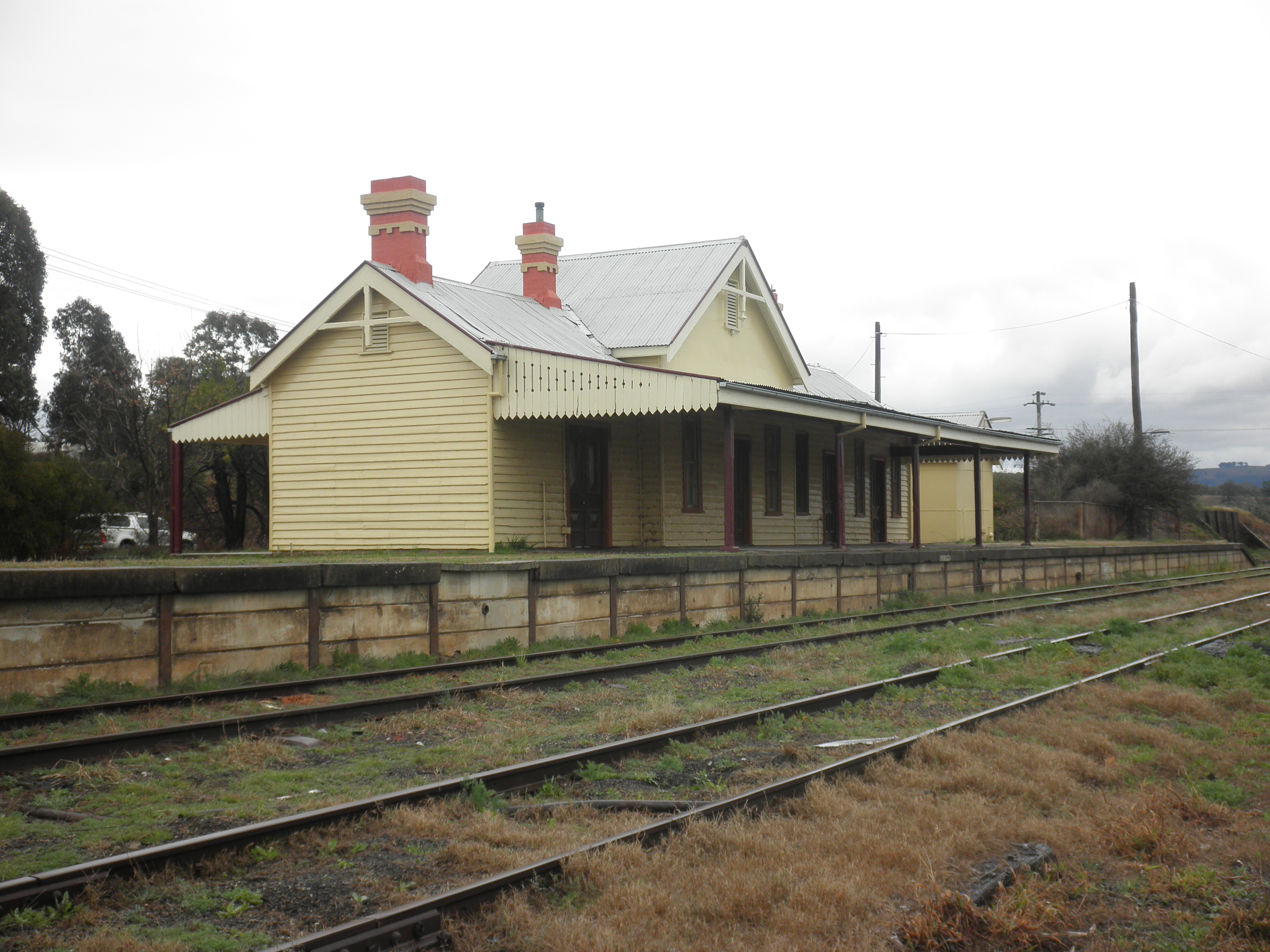
- Rylstone station in 2011

- Location within New South Wales Location within Australia
- 32.7964°S 149.9753°E
- Location: Wallerawang–Gwabegar railway, Rylstone, Mid-Western Regional Council, New South Wales, Australia

Site notes
- Owner: Transport Asset Holding Entity

New South Wales Heritage Register
- Official name: Rylstone Railway Station and yard group
- Type: state heritage (complex / group)
- Designated: 2 April 1999
- Reference no.: 1240
- Type: Railway Platform / Station
- Category: Transport – Rail

Rylstone railway station is a heritage-listed railway station on the Gwabegar railway line at Rylstone, Mid-Western Regional Council, New South Wales, Australia. Although it closed to regular passenger services in 1985, it is now a terminus for heritage train operations. The property was added to the New South Wales State Heritage Register on 2 April 1999.

== History ==
Rylstone railway station opened on 9 June 1884 with the extension of the railway from Capertee.

The rail passenger service ceased on 2 December 1985. It is not known when the station was formally closed. Freight services beyond Kandos ceased in 1992.

After the station's closure, it was used as a craft store and then later for storage.

The first passenger service in over twenty years arrived at Rylstone in March 2016 as an initial one-off tourist service for the Rylstone Show. In October 2017, the state government pledged $1.1 million to reinstate the rail link between Kandos and Rylstone following an effort by the Kandos Museum and Lithgow State Mines Railway to form a tourist rail precinct. The Kandos-Rylstone Rail Heritage Precinct group leased the Kandos railway station with the aim of establishing a regular tourist service between Kandos and Rylstone by the end of 2018. The restored section of the line was officially opened on 29 September 2018.

== Description ==
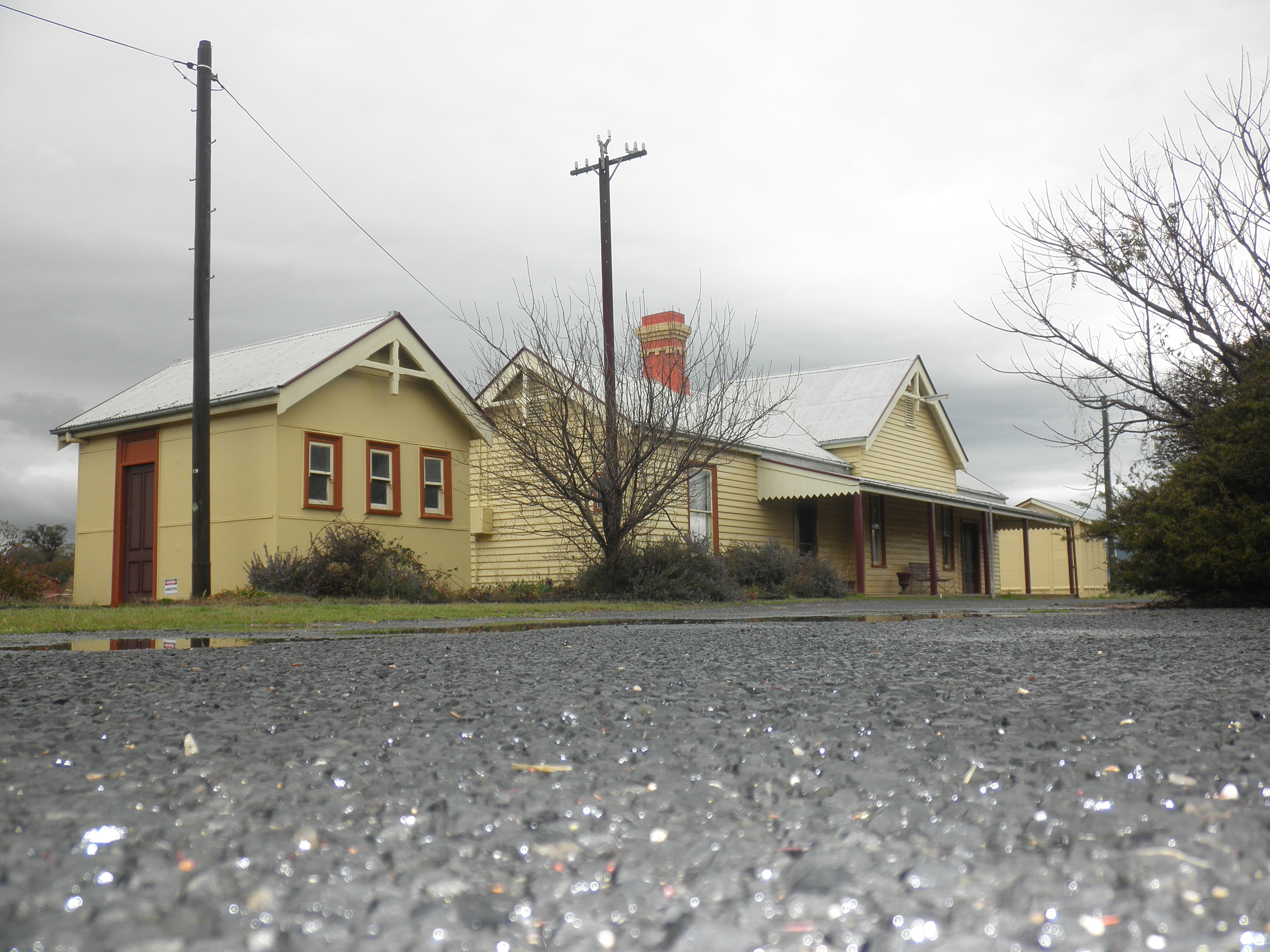
Rylstone station in 2011

The station complex consists of a timber station building of a type 4 standard roadside design, completed in 1884, along with a platform faced in pre-cast concrete and a corrugated iron goods shed in a side shed design with a 72' x 22' crane. It also includes a dock platform, jib crane and loading bank. The trees in the forecourt and station area are also included in the heritage listing.

== Heritage listing ==
Rylstone station group is a good late Victorian station complex situated in an important historic town. The station retains its setting with forecourt and fencing in the close to original form. The station building is a superb example of a timber country wayside station retaining original detailing, it is typical of many similar buildings constructed during the 1870s and 1880s, few of which survive. The brick residences (now sold) constructed at the same time as the station are in close to original condition and with the other buildings complete the group.

Rylstone railway station was listed on the New South Wales State Heritage Register on 2 April 1999 having satisfied the following criteria.

The place possesses uncommon, rare or endangered aspects of the cultural or natural history of New South Wales.

This item is assessed as historically rare. This item is assessed as arch. rare. This item is assessed as socially rare.

== See also ==
- List of disused regional railway stations in New South Wales
