= Winifred Holt =

American sculptor

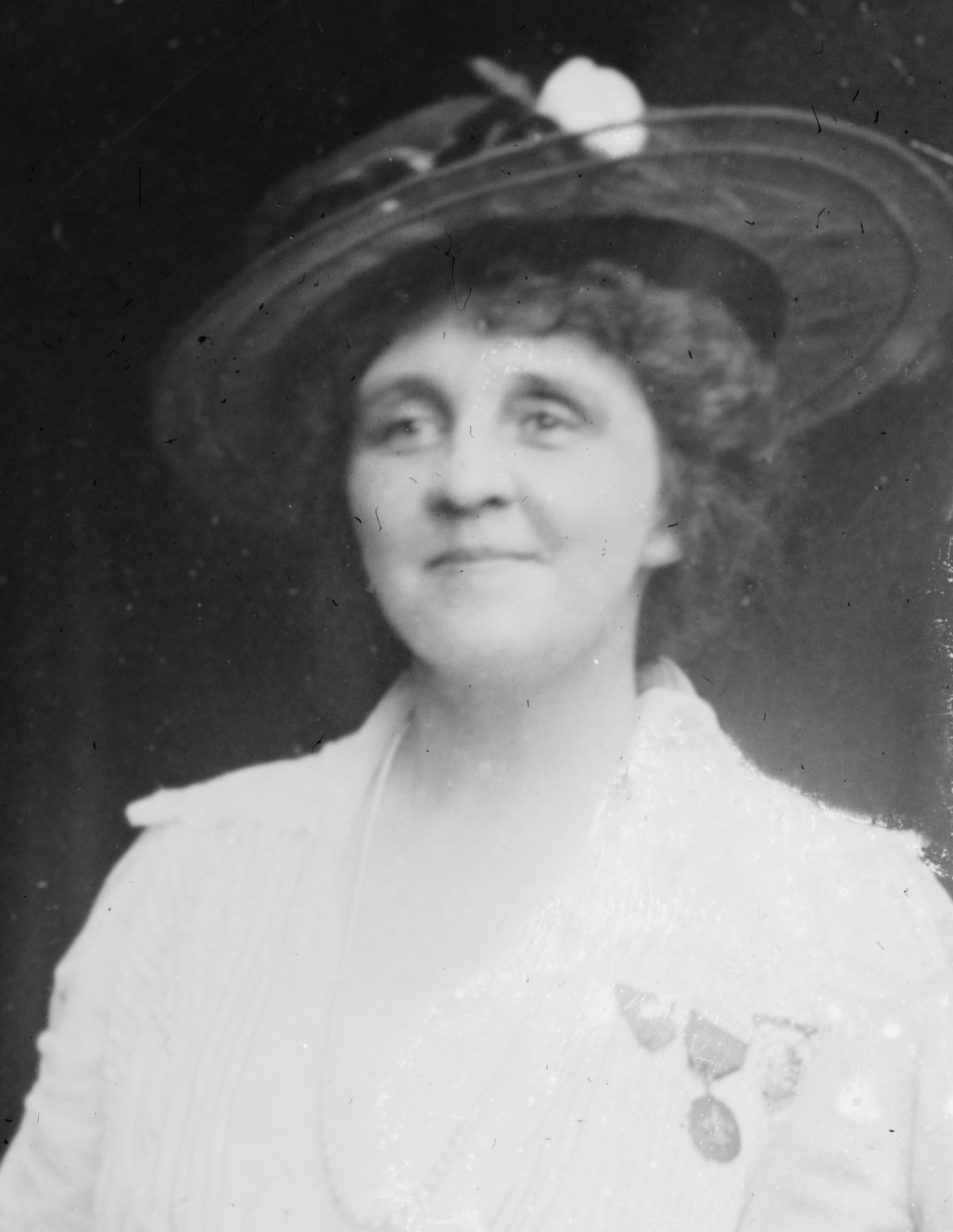
- Winifred Holt, from a photograph in the Library of Congress.
- Born: 17 November 1870; New York, New York, United States
- Died: 14 June 1945 (aged 74); Pittsfield, Massachusetts
- Other names: Winifred Holt Mather, Winifred Mather
- Occupation(s): Artist, philanthropist
- Parent: Henry Holt (publisher)
- Relatives: Joseph Colt Bloodgood (brother-in-law)

Signature
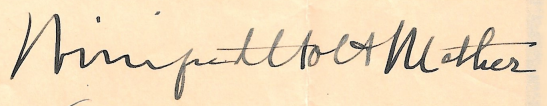

Winifred Holt (17 November 1870 – June 14, 1945) was an American sculptor and philanthropist who founded the New York Association for the Blind, later known as Lighthouse International.

== Early life and education ==
Winifred Holt was born in New York on 17 November 1870, the daughter of Henry Holt and Mary Florence West Holt. Her father was a wealthy publisher, and her maternal grandfather was financier James Selby West. Her sister Edith married surgeon Joseph Colt Bloodgood.

Holt was educated at the Brearley School in New York. She took lessons in sculpture, anatomy, and drawing during a visit to Florence in 1894.

== Career ==
With her father's encouragement, Holt assisted at a settlement house the Bowery district of New York for several years, while also attending plays, concerts and opera performances. On another visit to Italy, in 1901, she and her sister Edith observed a group of blind students at a concert, engrossed by the music. In 1903 they started New York's Ticket Bureau for the Blind, and Winifred devoted the rest of her life to assisting blind people. She campaigned for New York's first census of blind residents. She worked for sight-saving measures for babies and schoolchildren, and against firecrackers: "She urges that patriotism may be taught the rising generation without such ruthless sacrifice as 600 children losing their sight on one day, in the celebration of our national independence," reported a 1913 profile.

The New York Association for the Blind was founded at the Holt's home in 1905. The organization is today known as Lighthouse International. In 1913 the first "Lighthouse" center opened in New York City, a six-story building modeled on a settlement house, and dedicated by President William Howard Taft. Lighthouse centers assisted blind people in education, vocational training, job placement, and recreation. She opened similar centers in many other cities in the United States, and then in other countries, including Italy, Japan, China, and Brazil. She attended international conferences on blindness in Edinburgh in 1908 and in London in 1914. In 1914 she was awarded a gold medal by the National Institute of Social Sciences, for her contributions to social welfare work.

During and after World War I, Holt spent eighteen months in France, where she met with blinded veterans and worked towards rehabilitation and vocational opportunities for them. In 1921 Winifred Holt was made a Chevalier of the French Legion of Honour.

== Personal life ==
Winifred married Rufus Graves Mather on 16 November 1922. She died in Pittsfield, Massachusetts in 1945 of hypertensive heart disease, aged 74 years. Her husband and sister compiled a biography of Holt after she died, and published it in 1952.

== Gallery ==
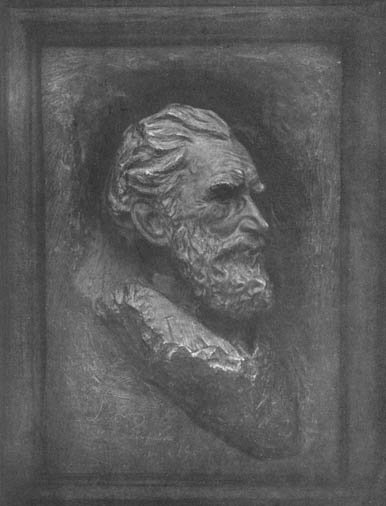
Carl Schurz bas-relief (1903)

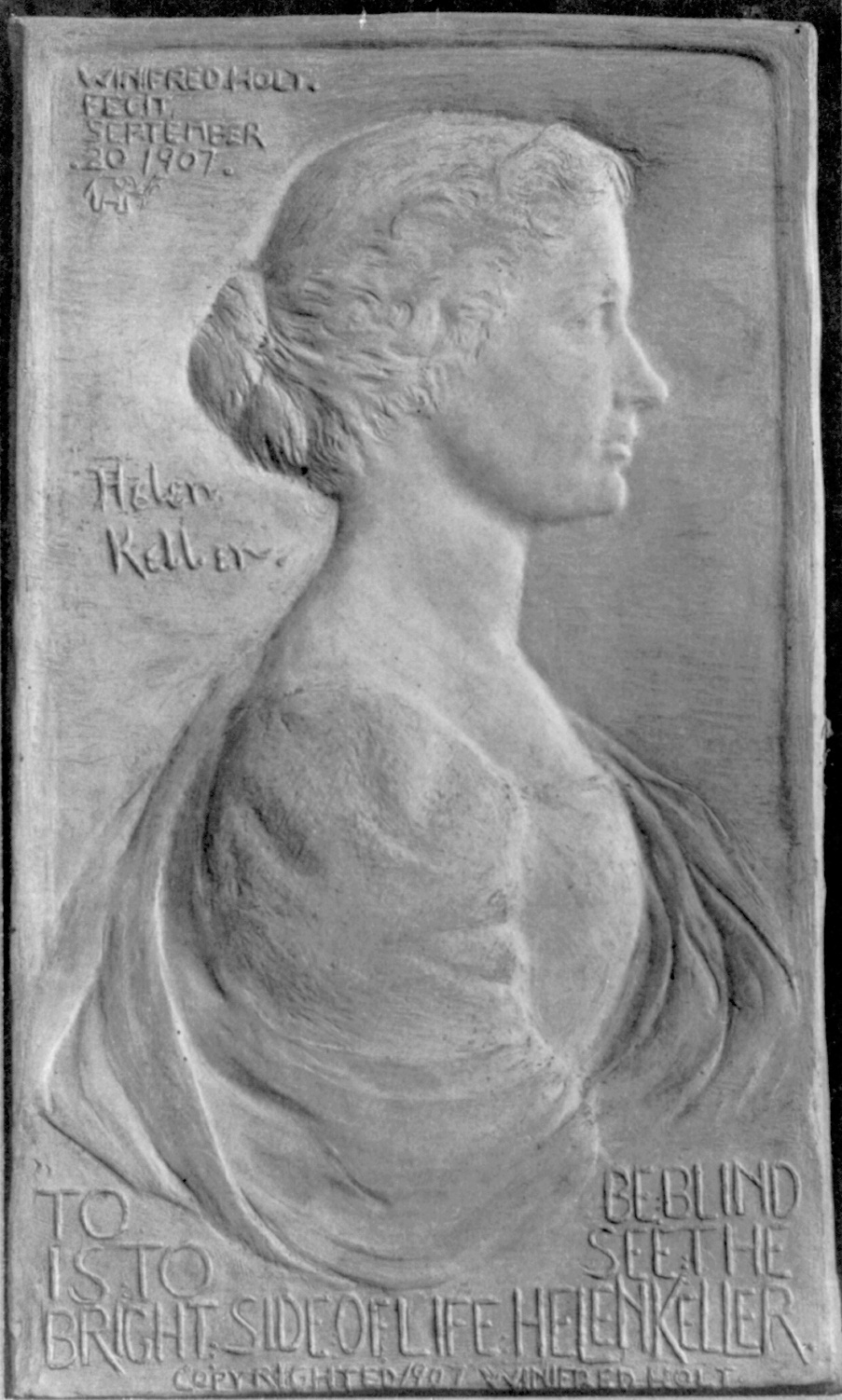
Helen Keller (1908)

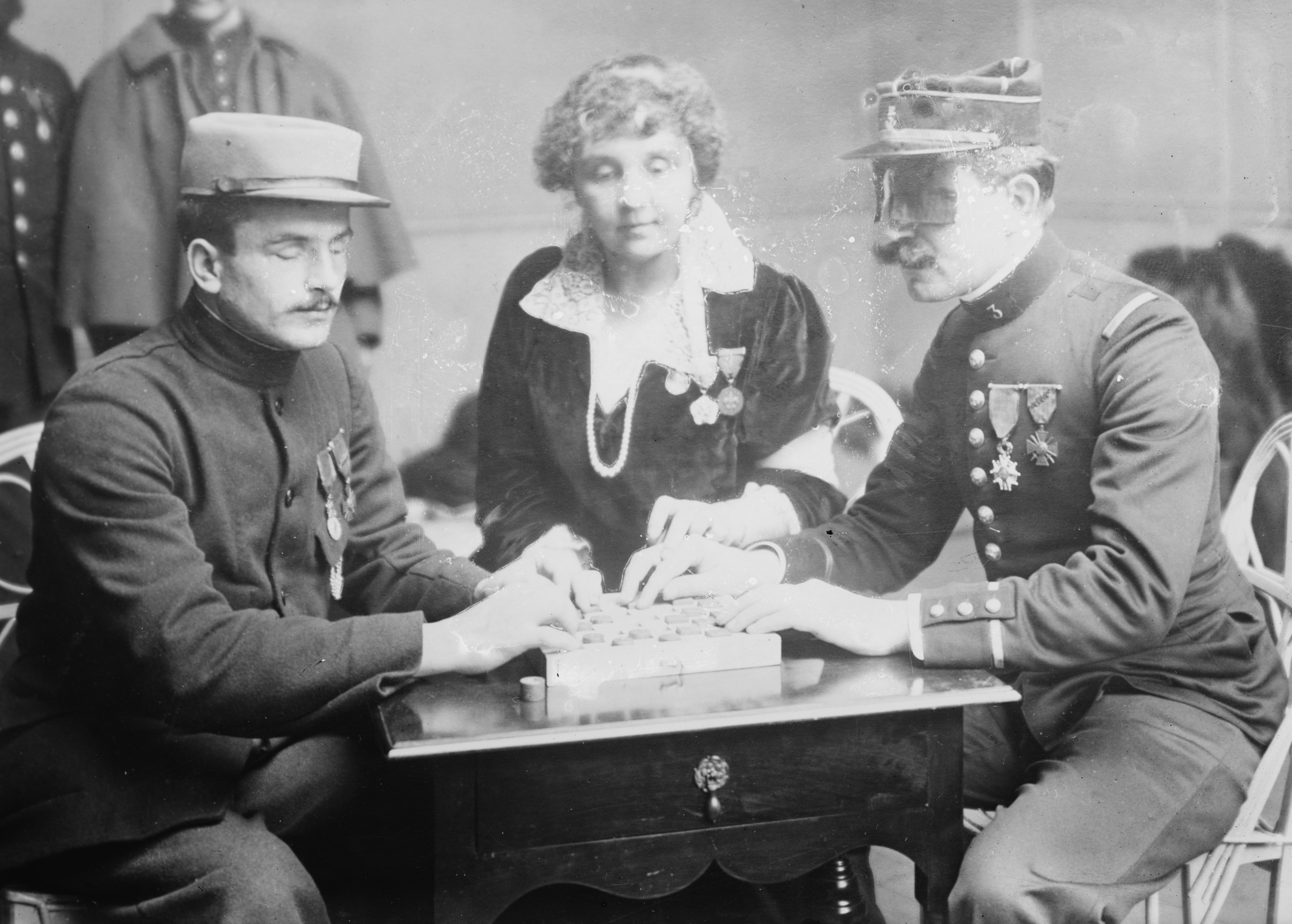
Holt teaching blind officers to play checkers
