= Rylstone, New South Wales =

Rylstone
- Town
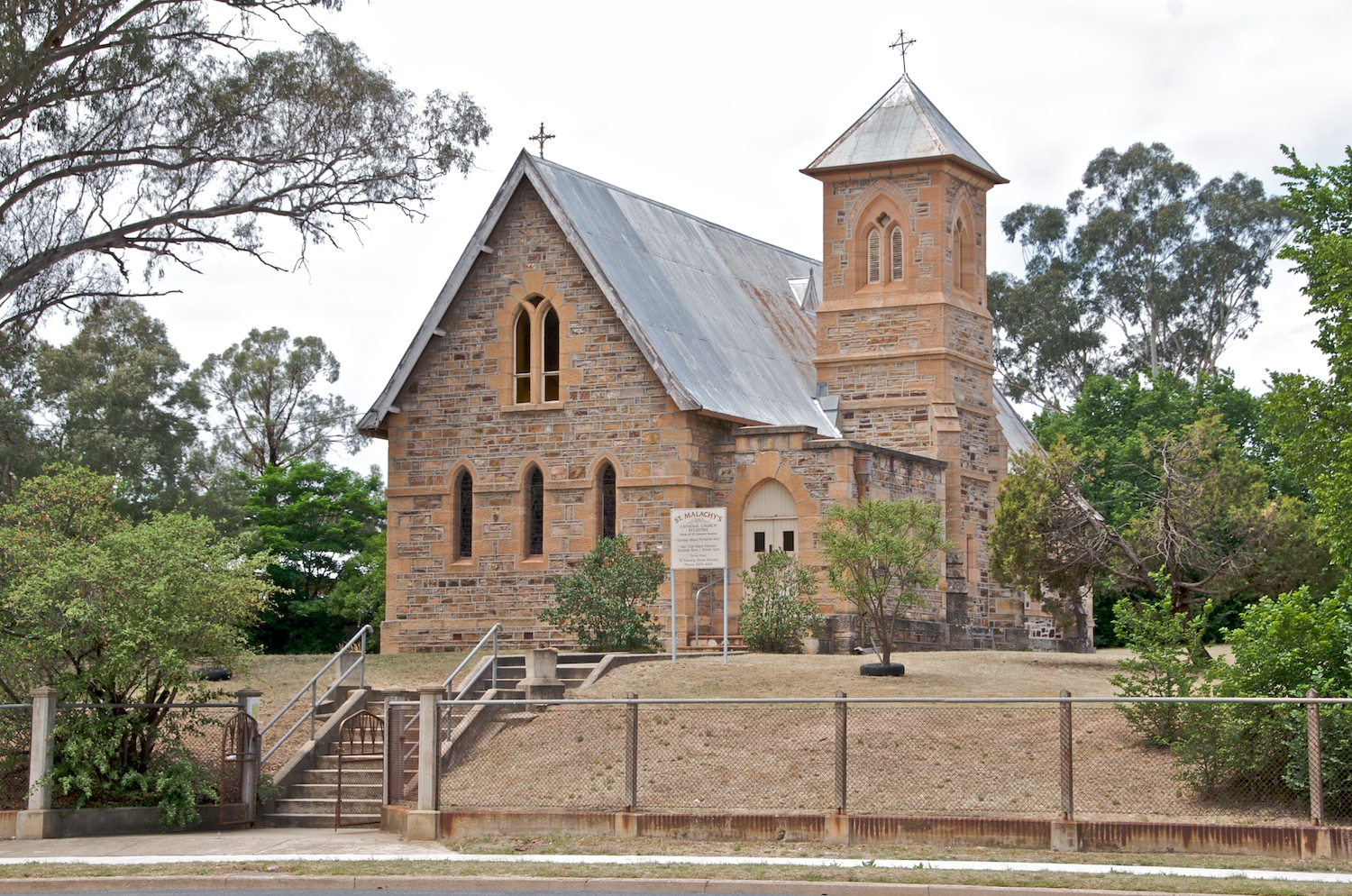
- St Malachy's Church Rylstone

- Coordinates: 32°48′S 149°58′E
- Country: Australia
- State: New South Wales
- LGA: Mid-Western Regional Council
- Location: 241 km (150 mi) NW of Sydney; 99 km (62 mi) NE of Bathurst; 97 km (60 mi) N of Lithgow; 54 km (34 mi) SE of Mudgee; 7 km (4.3 mi) N of Kandos

Government
  - State electorate: Bathurst
  - Federal division: Calare
- Elevation: 582 m (1,909 ft)

Population
  - Total: 904 (2021 census)
- Postcode: 2849
- Mean max temp: 23.0 °C (73.4 °F)
- Mean min temp: 8.3 °C (46.9 °F)
- Annual rainfall: 675 mm (26.6 in)

Rylstone is a town in New South Wales, Australia, in the Central Tablelands region within the Mid-Western Regional Council local government area.

Rylstone is a rural town located within the Mid-Western Region in New South Wales, Australia. It is located on the Bylong Valley Way road route. In the 2021 census, Rylstone had a population of 904. The area surrounding Rylstone is the traditional home of the Dabee tribe of the Wiradjuri people. Rylstone shares much of its locality, employment and infrastructure with its neighbouring town Kandos, 6 kilometres away; the two towns have a shared community which is connected by farming, the arts and Aboriginal culture. Rylstone is within a half an hour drive of Mudgee, and within two hours of Lithgow and Bathurst. Rylstone is a three hour drive from Sydney (via the Blue Mountains and Castlereagh Highway); and Newcastle (via Bylong Valley Way).

== Amenities ==
=== Ganguddy ===
Ganguddy, (also known as Dunns Swamp) is a popular recreation area and lake in the Wollemi National Park. Ganguddy was established when Cement Australia constructed a weir on the Cudgegong River to provide piped water to the Kandos Cement Works. Current facilities include bushwalking tracks, picnic areas, camping sites, Aboriginal art, fishing and kayaking services run by locals throughout the summer. Many also recreationally jump off of the rocks that surround Ganguddy. Ganguddy is popular with both locals and tourists from around Australia, with up to 40,000 visitors per year.

=== 19th Century buildings ===
Rylstone has retained its original character buildings from its beginnings. Some notable buildings are the Bridge View Inn, the Globe Hotel, the post office, the police station, the courthouse and the shire hall. The old town granary was built in the early 1840s.

=== Historic hotels and pubs ===
There was a pub named The Shamrock Hotel, and was located on the southern side of the railway bridge. It was built by Michael Hayes in 1885 and closed in 1890.

=== Ferntree Gully ===
Ferntree Gully is a rainforest area 17 kilometres north of Rylstone. Walking tracks take visitors down into the narrow fern tree-studded valley floors and present unusual rock formations.

=== Other places in the surrounding areas ===
- Nullo Mountain – is a high mountain plateau to the north of Dunns Swamp with views over the Wollemi Wilderness and the Widden Valley.
- Lake Windamere – a large water supply dam with camping facilities, used for water sports and fishing
- Historic streetscape – The town has several old stone buildings, especially in Louee Street
- Wollemi National Park - the second largest national park in New South Wales, and contains a large part of the Wollemi Wilderness area.

== District events ==
The Rylstone and District Agricultural Show happens late February each year. The RDAS was formed and the first show was held on 17 April 1937. Prior to that, the Rylstone Horticultural Society formed 1 August 1892 ran shows, with the first show occurring 9 November 1892.

The Rylstone Street Feast is a food and wine event that occurs each November. Rylstone main street is closed and tables and stalls are set up along the street. The event showcases the region's produce.

Established in 2011, the Rylstone Classic is an annual motoring event attracting over 200 classic Mini vehicles to the region. The two-day event departs from the Central Coast of New South Wales and tours the scenic roads of the mid-west, travelling either via the south through the Blue Mountains or via the north through the Bylong Valley. The overnight event centres activities on the town's central pub and brings almost 400 tourists to the area and surrounds.

Rylstone is predominantly an agricultural community with wool, sheep, cattle, wine grapes, and olives, being among the main pursuits. Coal mining and cement production are also significant employers in the community with these works being located in the nearby town of Kandos.

== Tourism ==
Rylstone is on the tourist route that has developed following the final sealing of the Bylong Valley Way. The sealing of the route was commenced in 1950 and completed in April 2009. A large part of the Bylong Valley Way route lies between the Wollemi and Goulburn River National Parks. Business associations and local governments in the area are promoting the journey to develop the tourist potential. A route is now available from Sydney through the Hunter Valley and return to Sydney via Rylstone providing a tourist loop.

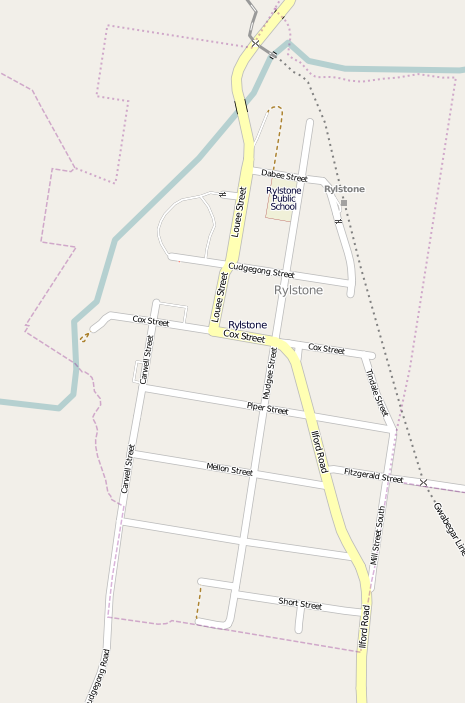
Rylstone Street Map

== Transport and railway line ==
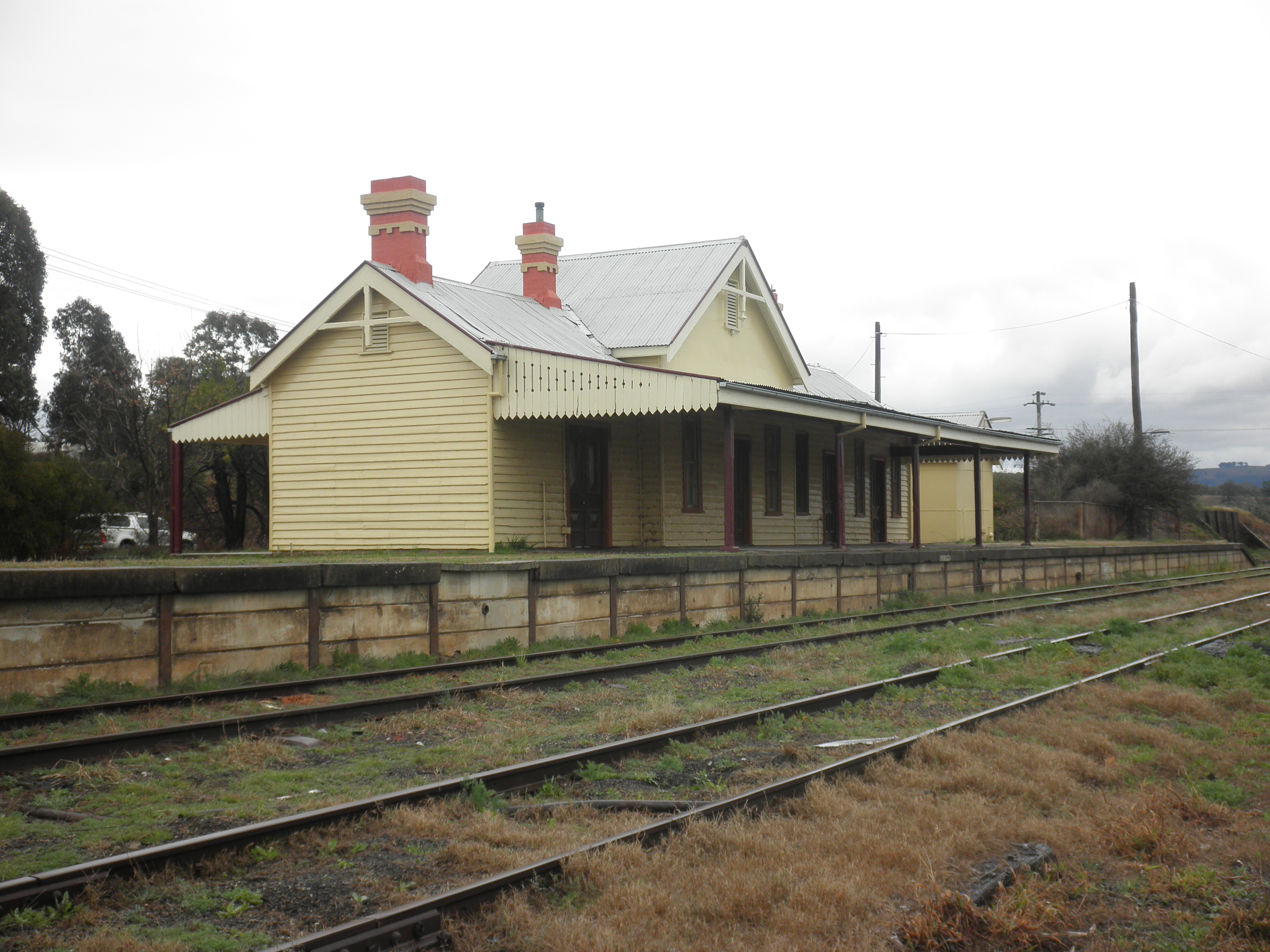
Rylstone railway station in 2011

On 9 June 1884, the railway was opened to Rylstone, transforming the status of Rylstone village to that of a town. The railway yard included a goods shed, trucking yards, and turntable. Notably, Henry Lawson's father, Niels Hertzberg Larsen, helped build the timber Rylestone railway station. The line was extended from Rylstone to Mudgee and this section was opened on 10 September 1884. Rylstone is located on the Gwabegar railway line. In April 1895 a railway telephone line was installed between Wallerawang and Mudgee with Rylstone as an intermediate telephone point. The telephone was an important safety feature on this railway due to the steep cliffs and tunnels that occur on both sides of Rylstone allowing quick and clear communication of problems. The railway line through Rylstone was closed on 2 March 1992 and remain closed for eight years. The New South Wales Government spent $11 million to resleeper the track, repair bridges, and level crossings reopening the line on 2 September 2000. The line was again closed seven years later on 30 June 2007; plans emerged to reopen the line for coal trains to operate between Cobbora Mine (near Dunedoo) and the Mount Piper Power Station and Wallerawang Power Station. On 24 October 2017 the New South Wales Government announced that $1.1 million would be provided to reinstate the eight kilometre rail link between Kandos and Rylstone, thus enabling tourist trains to access the resulting 'Kandos-Rylstone Rail Heritage Precinct'. The line to Rylstone station reopened on 29 September 2018.

=== Bridges ===
Four road bridges have spanned the Cudgegong River which flows through the town. The first bridge was a suspension bridge that was washed away by floods around 1867. This was followed by a second bridge of two spans built by a Mr Hayden soon after the flood. This second bridge was alongside the first bridge at the end of Hall Street. A third bridge built by Eddy Fitzgerald replaced the second in 1890 and was a little further up the river. The fourth bridge, and the only one remaining, which is still used today was built in 1948 to line up with the Bylong Road. A railway bridge also spans the Cudgegong River approximately 100 metres upriver of the present road bridge. This apart from upgrading works, to add additional centre pillars, is the original structure built during the construction of the line.

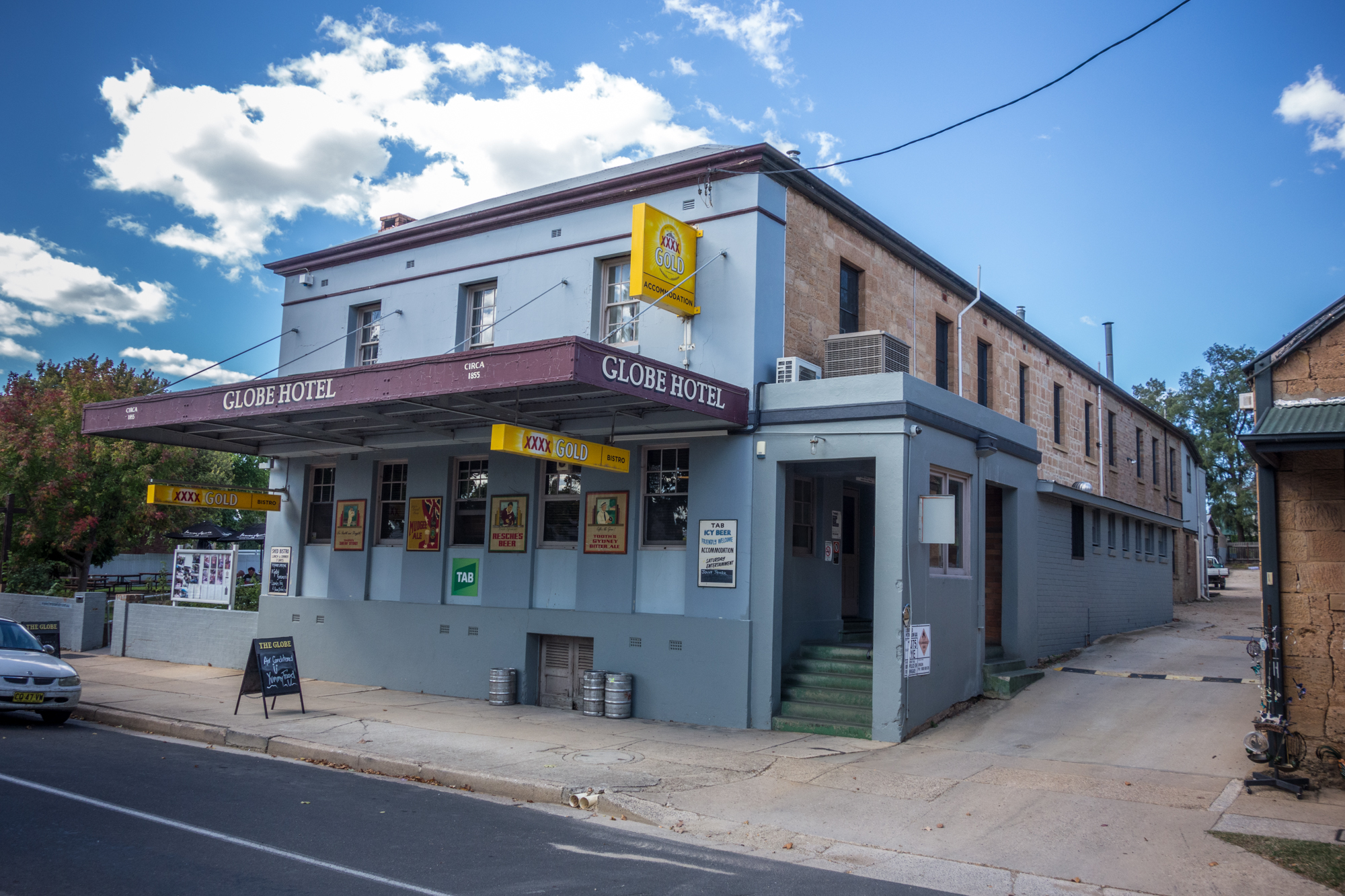
The Globe Hotel

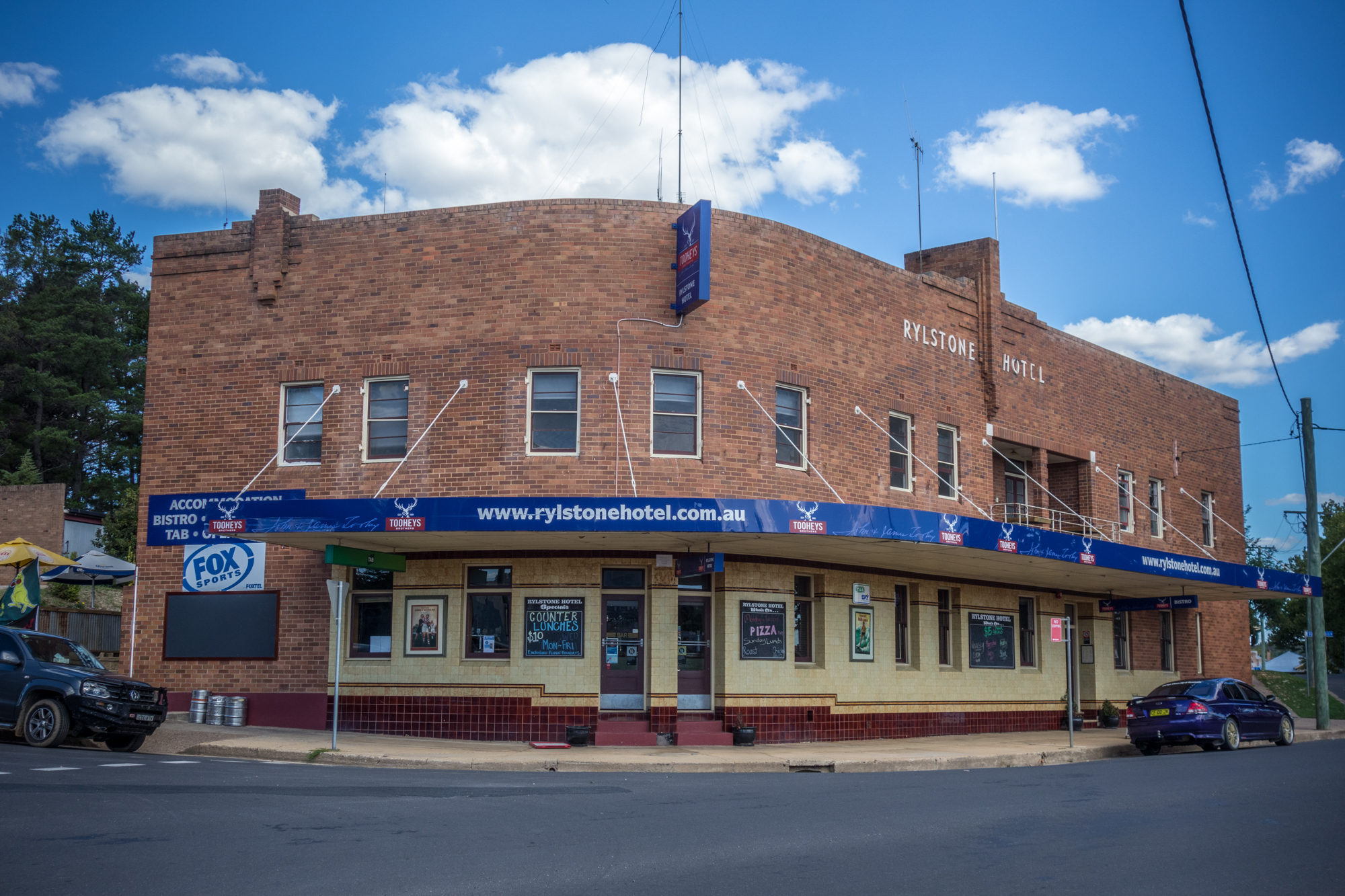
The Rylstone Hotel

== History ==
The district was originally known as Dabee (under various spellings). There are many contemporary newspaper references to the town being referred to as Ryalston in the period 1846 to mid-1850s then referred to as Ryalstone during the late 1850s. Rylstone town was laid out in 1846 by surveyor Davidson. By the 1850s Rylstone was becoming a well established town with post office, hotels, school, mills, and police lock-up. The Rylstone district was declared as a police district in 1854. Rylstone was formally proclaimed a town on 20 March 1885.

=== Naming ===
The name 'Rylstone' has no clear origin; however, several possible origins are promoted. Michael Hayes who built the Shamrock Hotel and other buildings at The Junction (where the Cudgegong River and Tong Bong Creek meet) claims responsibility. On travelling through the area he mentioned sleeping on 'that Ryle Stone' his Irish accent converting what was actually said 'Royal Stone'. Another tale suggests the Scots had a weapon called a Ryle Stone. This weapon being used when the Scots were at war with the Picts (England) and Scottish shepherds built their huts at the location of the current village of Rylstone. A petition was sent to Governor Gipps asking for a village to be called Tong Bong to be established at the present site of Rylstone. Governor Gipps granted permission for the village to be surveyed but he insisted that the village be called Rylstone and not Tong Bong. There is no evidence of any connection between Governor Gipps and the English village of Rylstone. Early maps spell Rylstone as Rylestone.

=== Early settlers and properties ===
- Richard Fitzgerald 1772–1840 (of Dabee Station) – an Irish political prisoner who became an emancipist
- Robert Fitzgerald (son of Richard) 1807–1865
- Edward Cox (of Rawdon Station)
- Daniel Cox (of Balmoral, Nullo Mountain) – Daniel Cox sailed from England as a convict on 16 August 1830
- John Nevell (of the property Carwell)
- John Thompson 1796–1873 and son William Barber Thompson 1821–1889 (Davis Swamp Holding, later named Olinda)
- Harry Thompson (of Warleigh to become Woodlands, near Nullo Mountain) no relation to the above Thompsons
- Thomas Harris (of Loowee, property that later became Lue and Monivae)

=== Buildings and businesses ===
The main commercial street, Louee Street, was originally an upper level and lower level street. In the 1930s the street was levelled and this created the high steps to the buildings on the high side of the road. Early buildings were constructed of timber slabs and stringy bark, later wattle and daub became common. Plentiful sandstone in the area led to significant buildings being constructed of that material.

- The Butter Factory – when closed it became the Freezing Works
- The Rabbit Factory – building demolished
- Cordial Factory – built in 1880 and owned by Mr JN Collins of Mudgee
- Court House and Gaol – built in 1870

=== Recent history ===
The Rylstone District was governed by a separate local government area known as the Rylstone Shire Council which was formed on 5 December 1906. Prior to that the area was administered by the Department of Public Works. In 2004 the New South Wales Government conducted an inquiry that found evidence of deteriorating finances as well as breaches of regulations in appointments and management of staff. It ruled all civic offices to be vacated and appointed an administrator to manage council's affairs. The council's relatively small area was ultimately amalgamated with the Mudgee Shire Council in March 2006 to become the Mid Western Regional Council.

== Aboriginal history ==
The local indigenous Aboriginals were the Dabee tribe and they in turn were part of the broader Wiradjuri group of people. Some of the localities in the area are derivations of Aboriginal words.

- Lue (chain of waterholes) believed to be pronounced in the Aboriginal language like Loowee
- Mudgee believed to derive from Moothi meaning nest in the hills
- Dabee – name of the local Aboriginal Tribe and the Fitzgerald's property was named after
- Wollemi – is derived from an aboriginal word meaning "watch out" or "look around you"
- Cudgegong – meaning red hill, noted for the red clay used by Aboriginal people in body decoration
- Tong Bong, pronounced "Tung Bung"

One of the last full blooded Aboriginal people of the Rylstone area was Peggy Lambert wife of Jimmy Lambert, she was buried in the Aboriginal section of the Rylstone Cemetery in June 1884. Another local Aboriginal person was Jimmy McDonald who was attached to the Rylstone Police station as a tracker.

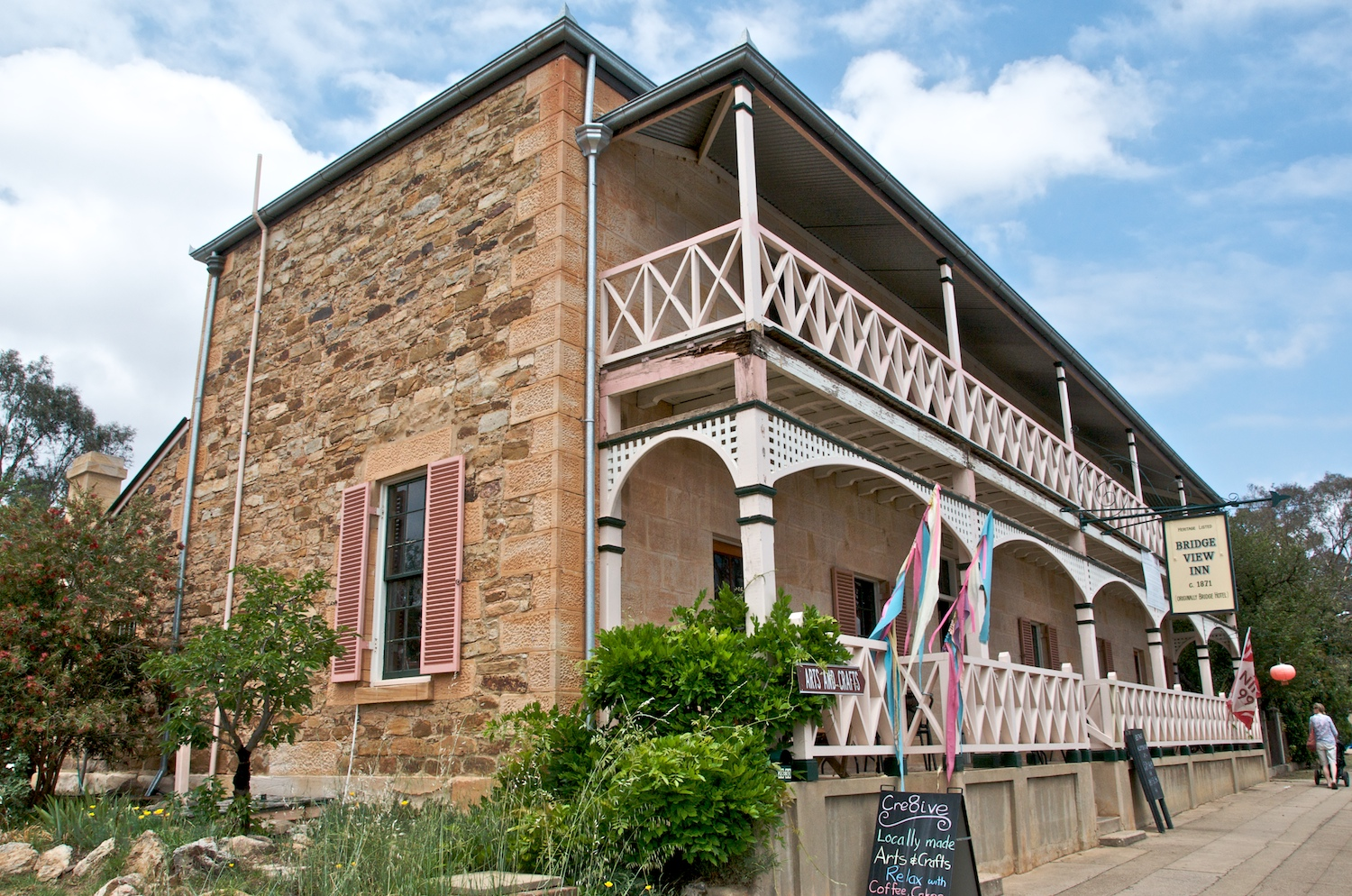
Bridge View Inn

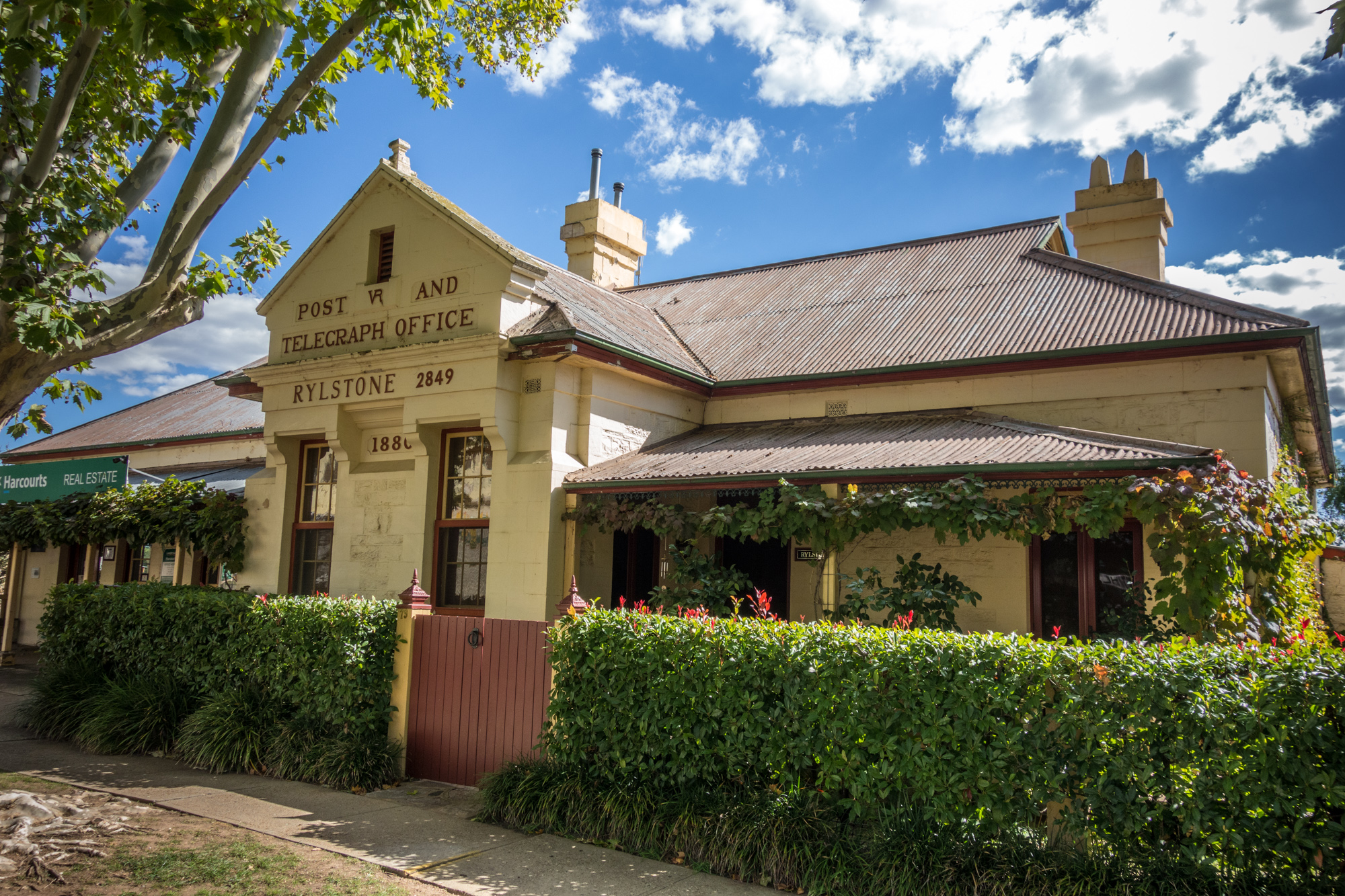
Post & Telegraph Office

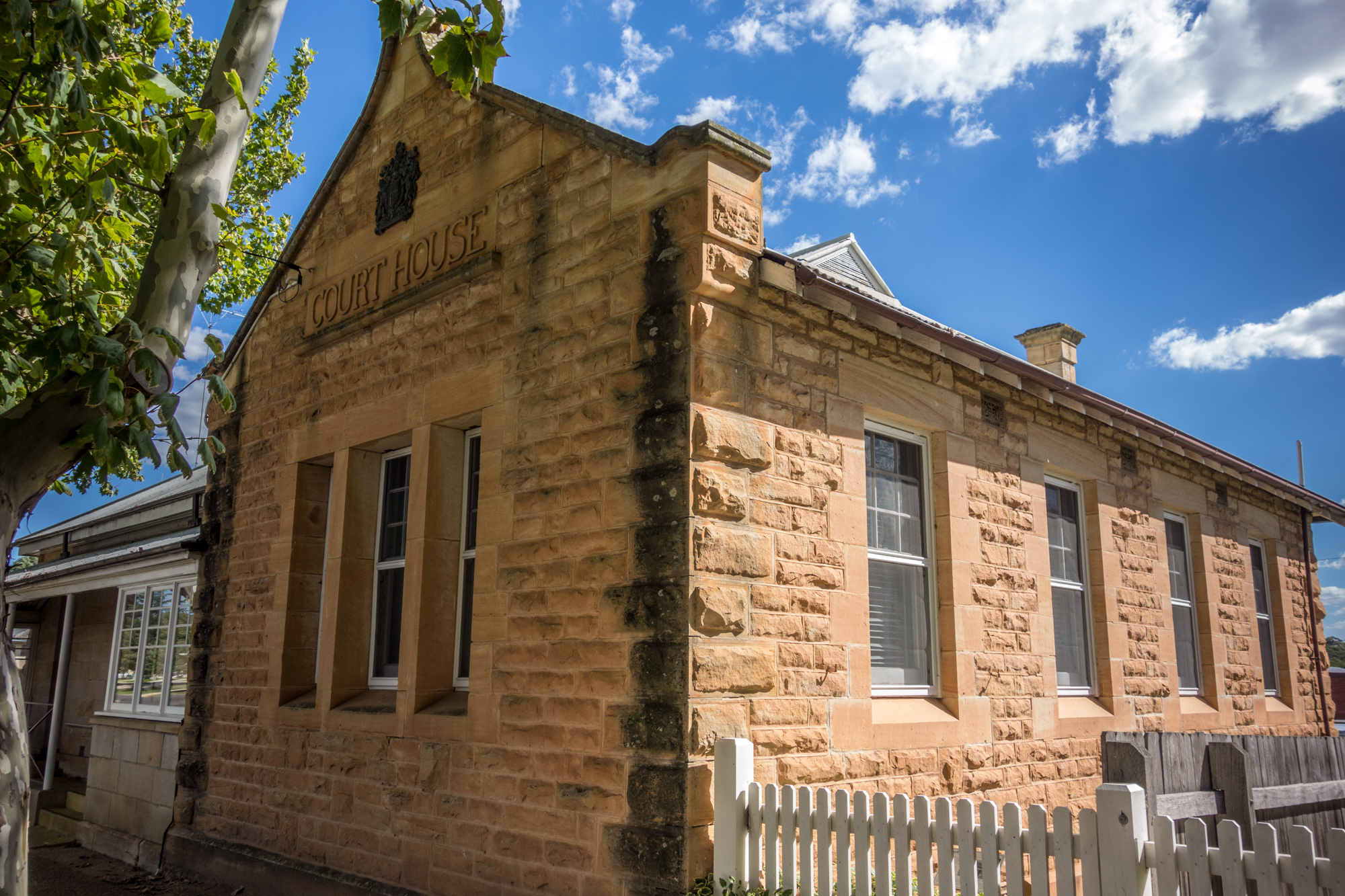
Court House

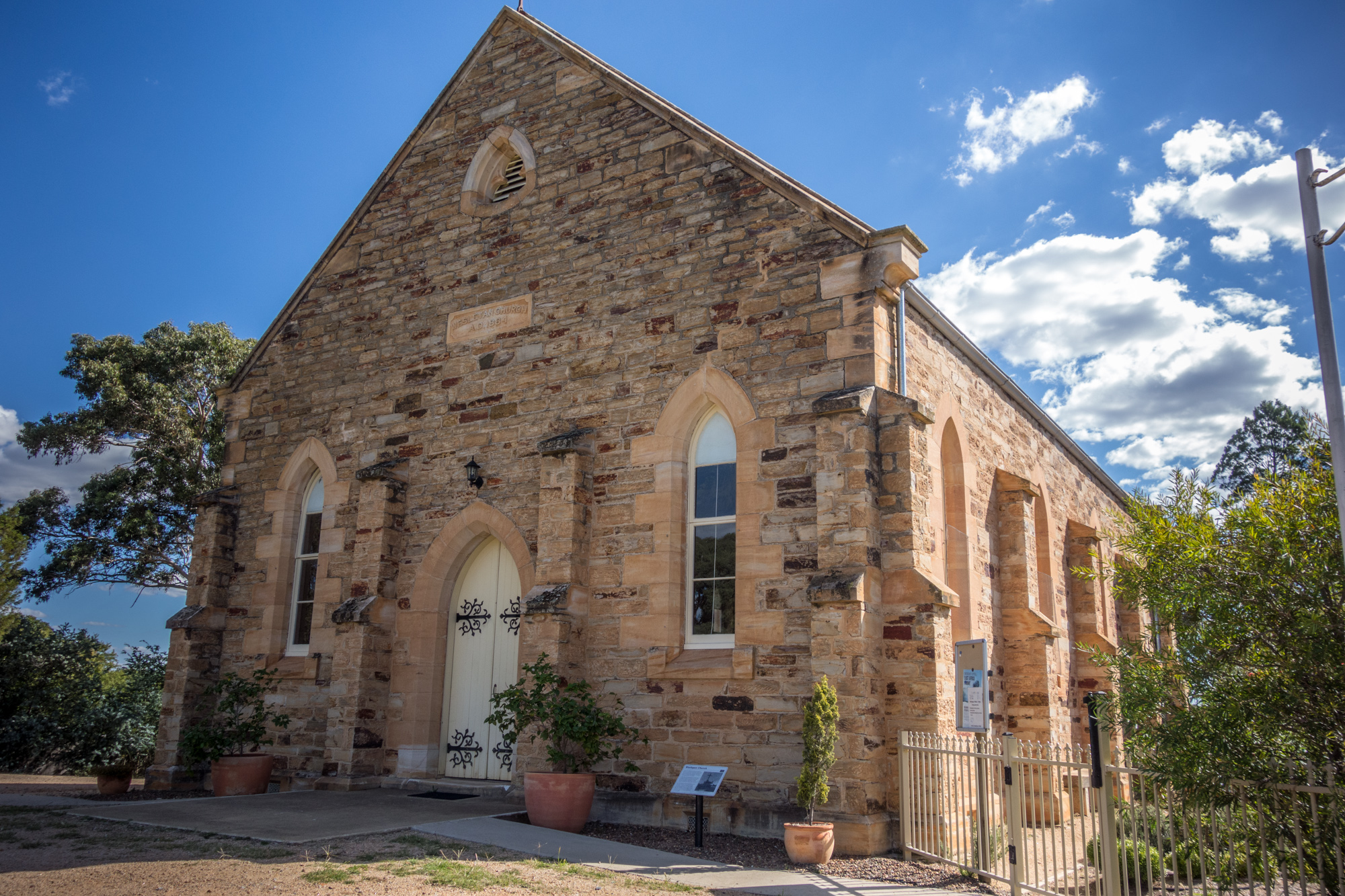
Wesleyan Church

== Timeline ==
- 1849 – Post Office opened on 1 January 1849.
- 1853 – Wesleyan Chapel opened on Sunday 15 May 1853
- 1857 – laying of foundation stone for new church, St James Rylstone on 19 May 1857
- 1857 – The School opened in July 1857.
- 1875 – Rylstone and district population was approximately 300 persons
- 1879 – Dr Dame Constance D'Arcy, a leading Sydney obstetrician and gynaecologist, born in Rylstone.
- 1880 – Telegraph Office was built and the Post Office relocated to this building
- 1894 – Gold discovered in Rylstone area, gold showing freely through reef, a gold rush results, 21 August 1894
- 1897 – A 70 oz gold nugget was found between Stony Pinch and Appletree Flat
- 1899 – Rylstone and other nearby towns promote themselves as a suitable site for the new Federal Capital
- 1903 – Coal was discovered for the first time by New Zealand mining company at Coomber (5 miles south of Rylstone)
- 1906 – A telephone line was opened between Rylstone and Mudgee, 1 February 1906
- 1907 – Iron and Steel manufacturing works proposed for Rylstone
- 1914 – A 50 line telephone switchboard was opened at Rylstone on 28 October
- 1915 – in April 1915 a new telephone line was constructed between Rylstone and Bylong
- 1915 – Tenders accepted for construction of a new hospital at Rylstone, £1723, 27 April 1915
- 1924 – A new direct telephone trunk line was built from Lithgow to Rylstone and on to Mudgee, prior to this date all calls to Sydney were connected via Switchboards at Rylstone, Mudgee, Bathurst then Sydney
- 1925 – The Rylstone school is destroyed by fire during school hours, no one is hurt, 6 August 1925
- 1925 – The Standard Portland Cement Company's Kandos Cement Works are under construction
- 1926 – An electrification scheme commenced for the towns of Rylstone and Kandos, power being supplied by the Kandos Cement Works, connection switched on in November 1926.
- 1926 – record rainfall of 1250 points (317mm) falling in a week (rain commencing 25 March 1926), washing out the Tong Bong crossing
- 1931 – Rich Shale Oil discovery at Rylstone
- 1935 – Hospital additions, new wing and nurses quarters were opened by Minister for Health on 3 August 1935, costing £1700
- 1938 – Discussions with NSW Government commenced on provided a water supply scheme for Rylstone.
- 1954 – A water supply dam was completed and pipes were installed to connect the town to running water
- 1960s – A sewage system was built and connected to houses and businesses in Rylstone
- 1981 – Saturday 30 May, the last Mudgee Mail train service ran through Rylstone around 4am, heading north to Gwabegar
- 1983 – The manual telephone switchboard closed in June, it was located in the Post and Telegraph Office

== Exploration ==
Several early explorers and settler explorers travelled this area in the early 1800s; they include Samuel Marsden, Macquarie, Edward Cox, James Blackman Jr., Jamison, FitzGerald, John Nevell and James Vincent. Several mountains in the area commemorate their journeys through the Glen Alice Valley and up the Turon River. James Blackman jnr. explored a route from Bathurst to the Cudgegong River and present site of Rylstone in 1820. Allan Cunningham, the botanist and explorer, on his first expedition to find a route from Bathurst to the Liverpool Plains noted in his diary in November 1822 being in the Tabrabucka area and on the second expedition 18 April 1823 passing through Dabee (now Rylstone). The Rylstone area is rich in natural mineral resources including coal, it is located on the western coalfield which extends from near Lithgow to Rylstone. Rylstone is an undeveloped coal resource and one of the last to be exploited. Charbon Coal Mine is a working mine approximately 10 km to the south of Rylstone. Large reserves of coal are known to exist, which is mostly thermal coal suitable for local coal-fired power stations. The NSW Minerals Department states that this resource will be allocated for developed in the short-term future. Cement was produced at the nearby Kandos Cement Works using limestone and clay raw materials from a mine situated 5 km to the east of Kandos. Recent explorations have revealed prospective deposits of rare-earth elements, a company is proposing further analysis of these mineral deposits.

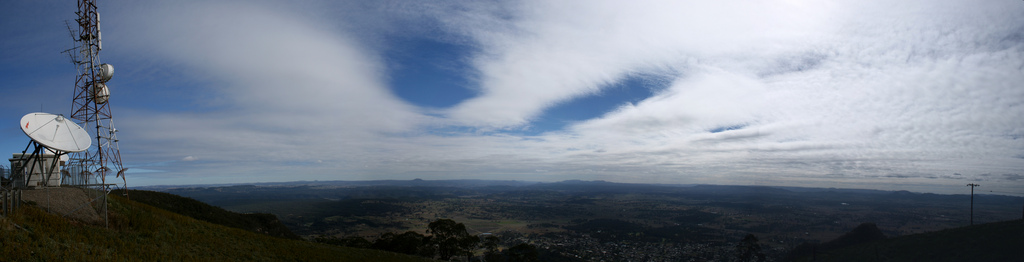
from Mount Coombermellon (locally known as Baldy) looking over Kandos and Rylstone

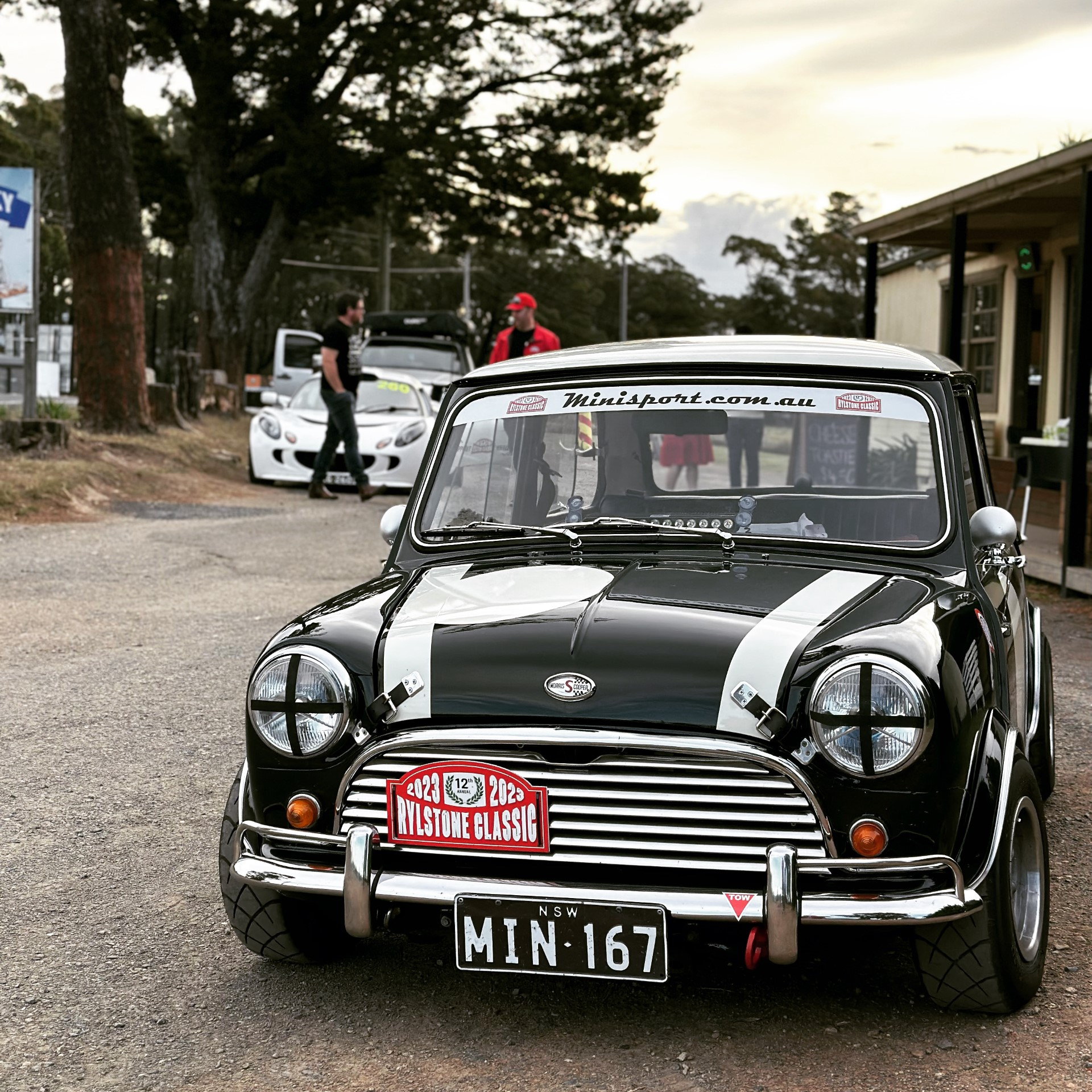
Classic Minis descend on Rylstone in their hundreds each year.

== Climate ==
Rylstone does not have a local weather station so the statistics are taken from the Mudgee weather station (approximately 42 km north west). Average temperatures range between 14 and 31 degrees Celsius in the summer (December–February) and 1 and 16 degrees Celsius in the winter (June–August). The average annual rainfall is 674.4 millimetres (26.55 in). Rylstone being approximately 130 metres higher in elevation would be about a degree cooler than Mudgee and notably wetter.

Climate data for Rylstone (Mudgee)
Month	Jan	Feb	Mar	Apr	May	Jun	Jul	Aug	Sep	Oct	Nov	Dec	Year
Mean daily maximum °C (°F)	31.0 (87.8)	30.2 (86.4)	27.8 (82.0)	23.3 (73.9)	18.8 (65.8)	15.2 (59.4)	14.4 (57.9)	16.0 (60.8)	19.6 (67.3)	23.4 (74.1)	26.9 (80.4)	29.8 (85.6)	23.0 (73.4)
Mean daily minimum °C (°F)	15.5 (59.9)	15.4 (59.7)	13.0 (55.4)	8.5 (47.3)	5.0 (41.0)	2.6 (36.7)	1.3 (34.3)	2.3 (36.1)	4.4 (39.9)	7.6 (45.7)	10.8 (51.4)	13.7 (56.7)	8.3 (46.9)
Average precipitation mm (inches)	68.0 (2.68)	64.2 (2.53)	50.3 (1.98)	44.2 (1.74)	49.3 (1.94)	55.0 (2.17)	53.2 (2.09)	53.0 (2.09)	51.5 (2.03)	60.3 (2.37)	61.0 (2.40)	64.2 (2.53)	674.4 (26.55)

== Gallery ==
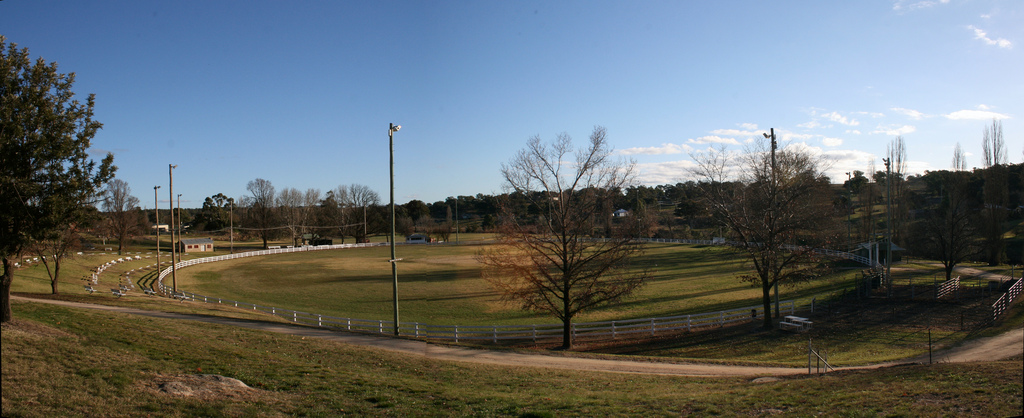
Rylstone Showground

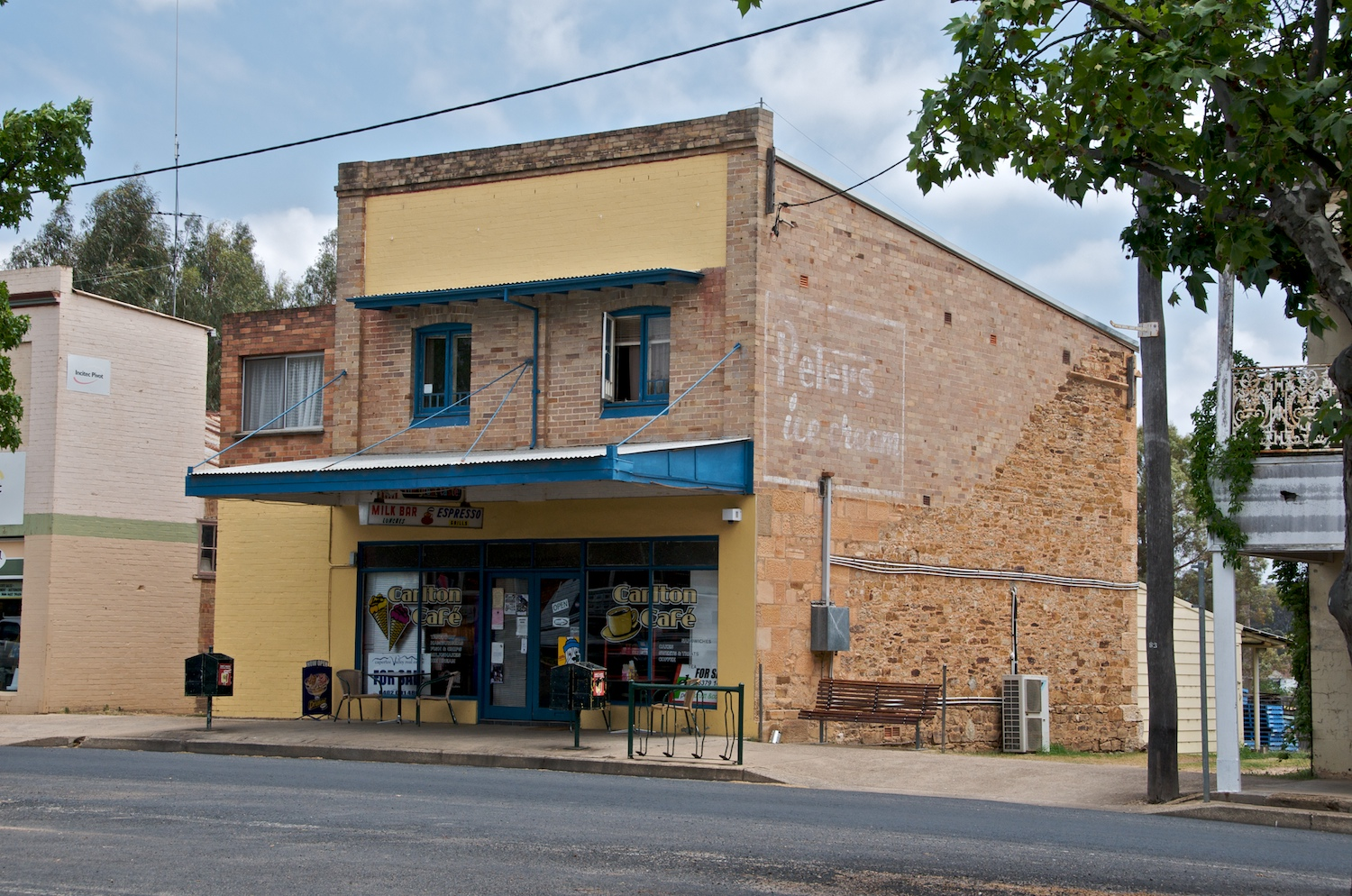
Carlton Cafe

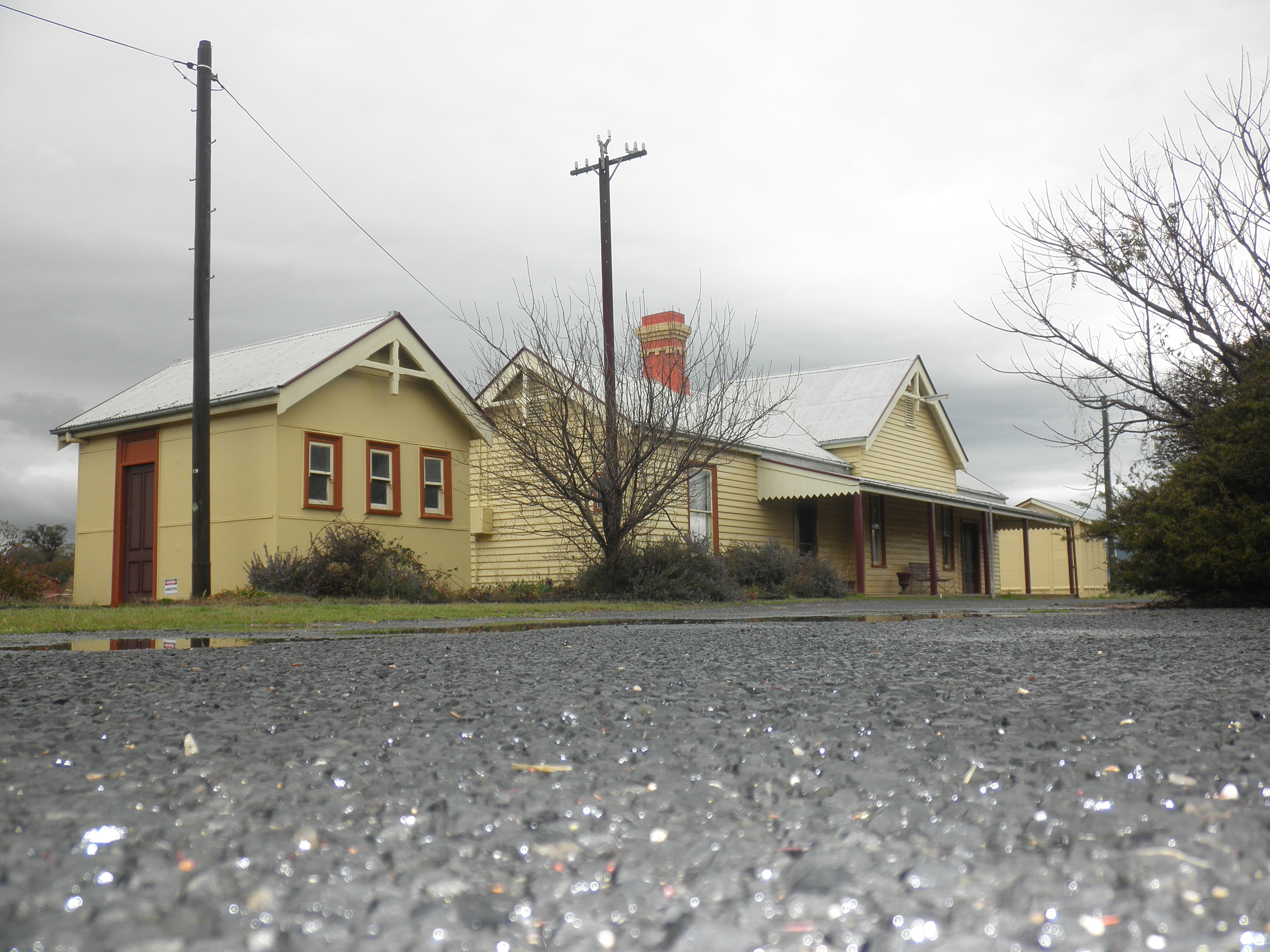
Rylstone railway station

== See also ==
Nearby towns and villages

- Kandos
- Mudgee
- Lue
- Clandulla
- Charbon
- Bylong
- Ilford

Related Wikipedia sites

- Electoral district of Rylstone

Other Rylstone-related links

- Boer War Hero, Lieutenant W.V. Dowling, resident of Rylstone
- Anzac (Dardanelles) Hero from Rylstone, Captain Edward Dawson, Killed in action at Lone Pine, central Anzac, on 6–8 August 1915, aged 35. Grave: Lone Pine cemetery
- Anzac (Dardanelles) Hero from Rylstone, Alfred Robbins Died in hospital in Greece from wounds received at Gallipoli 30 June 1915, aged 35.
