= Constance Elizabeth D'Arcy =

Australian obstetrician and gynaecologist

Dame Constance Elizabeth D'Arcy DBE
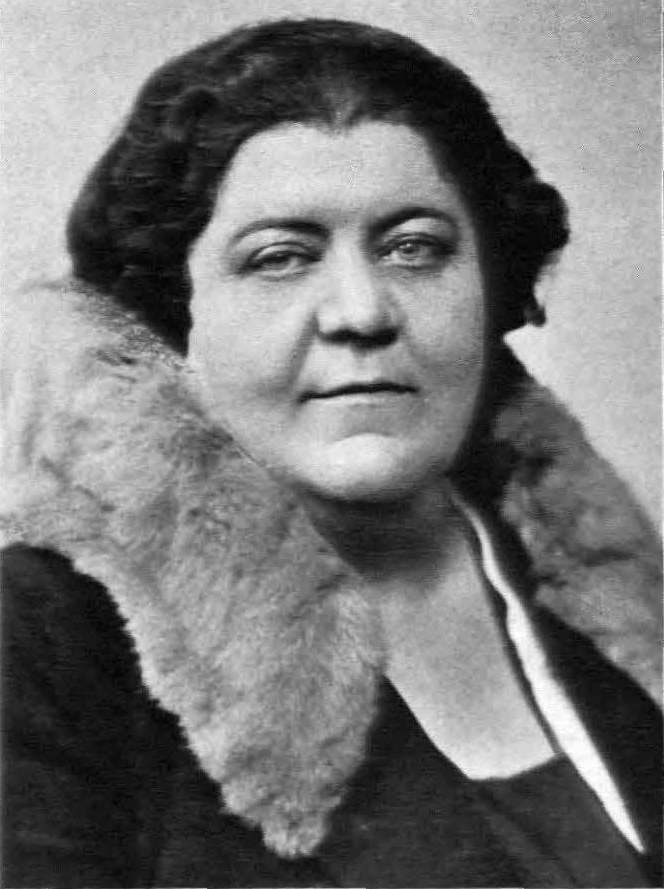
- Constance D'Arcy
- Born: Constance Elizabeth D'Arcy; 1 June 1879; Rylstone, New South Wales, Australia
- Died: 25 April 1950 (aged 70); Sacred Heart Hospice for the Dying; Darlinghurst, New South Wales, Australia
- Education: University of Sydney (BM, MS 1904)
- Occupations: Obstetrician and gynaecologist

Dame Constance Elizabeth D'Arcy DBE (1 June 1879 – 25 April 1950) was an Australian obstetrician and gynaecologist. She was Deputy Chancellor at the University of Sydney from 1943 until 1946. In 1935, she was made a Dame Commander of the Order of the British Empire (DBE).

== Early life and education ==
D'Arcy was born on 1 June 1879 at Rylstone, New South Wales, the fifth daughter to parents Bridget (née Synnott) and Murtagh "Murty" D'Arcy, a police sergeant. She attended Rylstone Public School and Riviere College, Woollahra.

D'Arcy completed a Bachelor of Medicine (BM) and Master of Surgery (CHM) at the University of Sydney in 1904 and went on to do her residency at the (Royal) Adelaide Hospital, because the teaching hospitals in Sydney did not accept women at the time.

== Career ==
D'Arcy became an honorary surgeon at the Royal Hospital for Women in Paddington and opened her own practice in Macquarie Street in 1908.

D'Arcy was a fellow of the Senate at the University of Sydney for thirty years from 1919 until 1949. She was Deputy Chancellor of the university from 1943 until 1946, being the first woman in this role. She was also an executive member of the Sydney University Women's Union, the Catholic University Women Graduates' Association and the Sydney University Women Graduates' Association.

At the Senate at the University of Sydney, D'Arcy supported the proposal to make St Vincent's Hospital a teaching hospital and served as honorary gynaecologist from 1923 until 1945.

In 1935, D'Arcy was invited to speak at the Australian Institute of Anatomy, Canberra. She spoke on maternal mortality, control of septicaemia and the rise in deaths from illegal operations, while condemning any move to legalise abortion. In 1940, she was awarded the Pro Ecclesia et Pontifice.

== Personal life and death ==
For many years, two of D'Arcy's sisters kept house for her. She died of cerebrovascular disease at Sacred Heart Hospice for the Dying, Darlinghurst, on 25 April 1950. After the requiem mass at St Mary's Cathedral, she was buried in Waverley Cemetery. To commemorate her service at the Royal Hospital for Women, a ward was named after her.

D'Arcy Place in the Canberra suburb of Chifley is named in her honour.

== Awards and honours ==
In 1935, D'Arcy was made a Dame Commander of the Order of the British Empire (DBE) for 'services in connection with maternal and child welfare in the Commonwealth of Australia'.
