= Lighthouse Guild =

US nonprofit organization

- Formation: 1906 – The New York Association for the Blind; 1914 – New York Guild for the Jewish Blind; 2013 – Lighthouse Guild
- Founders: Winifred and Edith Holt
- Type: NPO
- Legal status: 501(c)(3)
- Purpose: address and prevent vision loss in children and adults
- Headquarters: 250 West 64th St, New York, New York, US
- Region served: United States
- President & CEO: Calvin W. Roberts
- Chairman of the Board: James M. Dubin
- Main organ: Board of Directors
- Website: www.lighthouseguild.org

Lighthouse Guild is an American charitable organization, based in New York City, devoted to vision rehabilitation and advocacy for the blind. Its mission statement is "To overcome vision impairment for people of all ages through worldwide leadership in rehabilitation services, education, research, prevention and advocacy."

Formerly known as Lighthouse International, it merged with Jewish Guild Healthcare and as of January 2014 became known as Lighthouse Guild International, with the name eventually shortened to Lighthouse Guild.

== History ==
During a trip to Florence, Italy, at the turn of the 20th century, sisters Winifred and Edith Holt learned of a free service that provided concert tickets to blind schoolchildren. Inspired by the notion, the sisters established the similar Lighthouse Free Ticket Bureau in New York City in 1903. The organization was incorporated in 1906 as The New York Association for the Blind and offered home counseling and instruction program for the visually impaired. An early meeting for the board and the public, including blind men and women, was held at the Waldorf-Astoria hotel. Also in attendance were Secretary Miss Winifred Holt, Recording Secretary Miss Edith Holt, President Richard Watson Gilder, Vice-President Helen Keller, with honorary vice presidents Dr. Nicholas Murray Butler and Samuel Langhorne Clemens. The advisory board consisted of Dr. Felix Adler, Joseph H. Choate, John Farley, Bishop David Greer, Dr. William H. Maxwell and Dr. Charles H. Parkhurst.

Winifred Holt also participated in founding the New York State Commission for the Blind and Visually Handicapped. In 1912, the association established a workshop on East 42nd Street where visually impaired men could manufacture marketable products, and the sisters opened their home to visually impaired women to create handcrafted items for sale, leading to the organization's motto, "Light Through Work."

Lighthouse became international with the onset of World War I, when Winifred Holt in 1915 established Le Phare de Bordeaux, in France. Other overseas offices opened in Paris; Rome; Warsaw; Canton, China; Japan, the Middle East, India, South America, and elsewhere.

That same year, the association created the River Lighthouse, in Cornwall-on-Hudson, New York, as the first of its eventually several summer camps for visually impaired children. Camp Munger, in Bear Mountain, New York, followed in 1923. A kindergarten was formed in 1925, and the Lighthouse Nursery School in 1933. An affiliation with the Ophthalmological Foundation in 1952 led to that foundation becoming the organization's research arm. The following year, the Lighthouse Low Vision Service was founded to administer to people with partial sight.

Logo of predecessor organization Lighthouse International

In 1989, The New York Association for the Blind, Inc., became The Lighthouse Inc., and in 1998, the organization was renamed Lighthouse International.

In January 2010 Lighthouse International acquired the National Association for Visually Handicapped (NAVH), an organization which provided services for the partially sighted. In September 2013, a merger was announced with Jewish Guild Healthcare, under the name Lighthouse Guild International.

== Branches and services ==
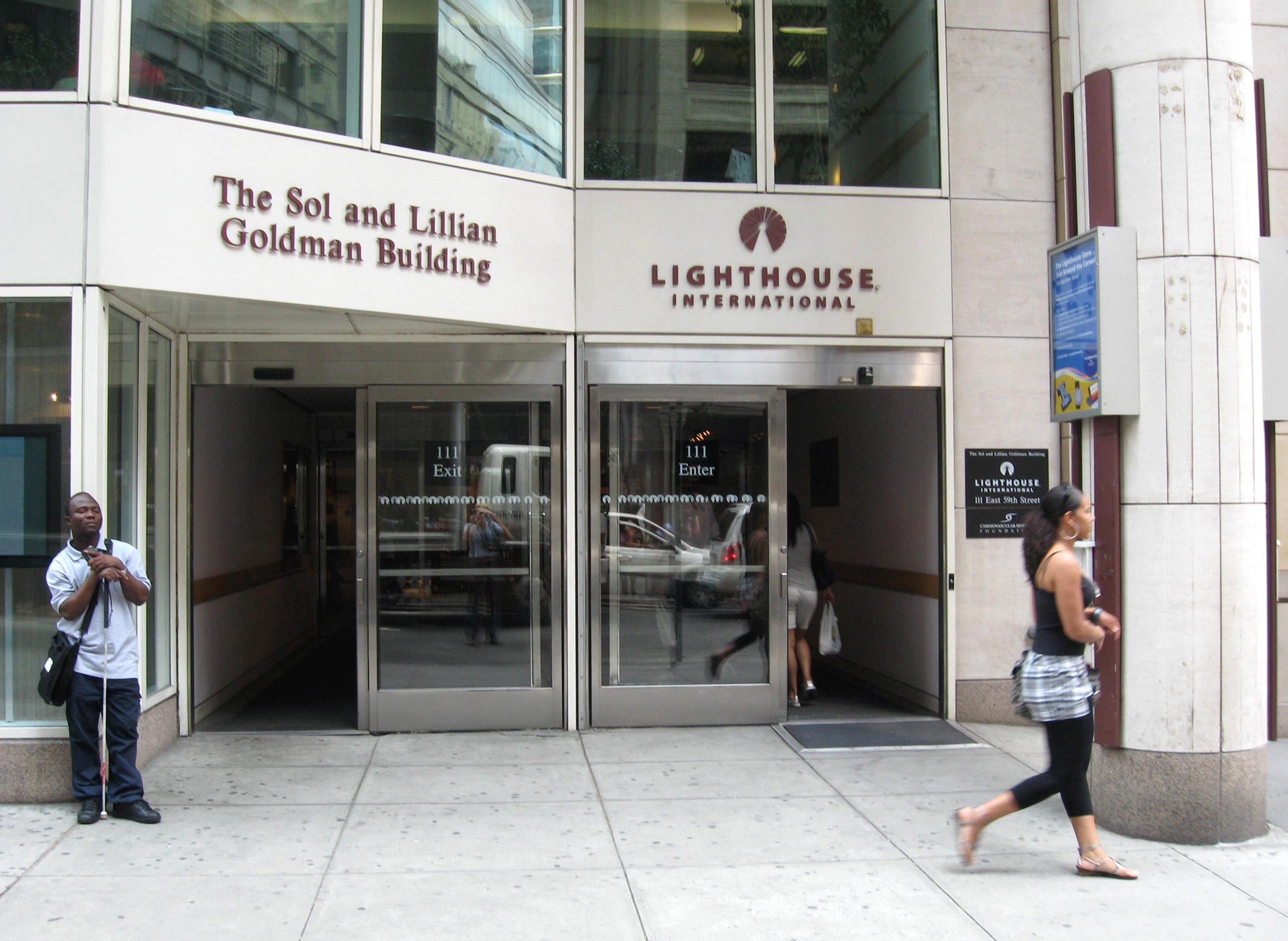
Former headquarters at 111 East 59th Street, New York City

It operates the Arlene R. Gordon Research Institute in New York, and New York Lighthouse Vision Rehabilitation Services.

The volunteer organization Tennis Serves introduced blind tennis in 2011 at Lighthouse International and at the California School for the Blind in Fremont, California.

== Headquarters ==
The organization was headquartered at the Sol and Lillian Goldman Building at 111 East 59th Street in New York City. This portion of East 59th Street was named Lighthouse Way in 1994. After the merger with Jewish Guild Healthcare, the headquarters moved to the Guild location at 15 West 65th Street. In 2018 it moved to 250 West 64th Street.
