= Constance D'Arcy Mackay =

American writer

Constance D'Arcy Mackay (1887 – 21 August 1966) was an American writer and playwright. She was a charter member of PEN International and authored over sixty plays in her time.
